= List of Russian football transfers summer 2021 =

This is a list of Russian football transfers in the 2021 summer transfer window by club. Only clubs of the 2021–22 Russian Premier League are included.

== Russian Premier League 2021–22 ==
=== Akhmat Grozny ===
In: Note: Flags indicate national team as defined under FIFA eligibility rules; some limited exceptions apply. Players may hold more than one non-FIFA nationality.

No.	Pos.	Nation	Player
4	DF	BIH	Darko Todorović (on loan from (Austria) Red Bull Salzburg)
5	DF	RUS	Vitali Lystsov (on loan from Lokomotiv Moscow)
11	MF	RUS	Igor Konovalov (on loan from Rubin Kazan)
13	FW	BFA	Mohamed Konaté (from Khimki)
18	FW	CIV	Senin Sebai (from Khimki)
32	DF	RUS	Ilyas Gaibov
41	MF	RUS	Turpal-Ali Arsaliyev
47	MF	RUS	Daniil Utkin (on loan from Krasnodar)
48	DF	RUS	Mikail Akhmedov
52	FW	RUS	Khabib Aziyev
68	FW	RUS	Artyom Arkhipov (on loan from Kuban Krasnodar)
74	DF	RUS	Askhab Usumov
75	DF	RUS	Selim Abdulmuslimov
76	DF	RUS	Akhmed Eldiyev
77	MF	RUS	Vladislav Karapuzov (on loan from Dynamo Moscow)
94	MF	RUS	Artyom Timofeyev (from Spartak Moscow, previously on loan)

Out: Note: Flags indicate national team as defined under FIFA eligibility rules; some limited exceptions apply. Players may hold more than one non-FIFA nationality.

No.	Pos.	Nation	Player
3	MF	RUS	Georgi Melkadze (end of loan from Spartak Moscow)
4	DF	VEN	Wilker Ángel (to (Turkey) Göztepe)
11	MF	BRA	Ismael (to (Saudi Arabia) Al Faisaly)
18	FW	SVK	Ladislav Almási (end of loan from (Slovakia) Ružomberok)
24	DF	RUS	Maksim Nenakhov (to Lokomotiv Moscow)
29	FW	RUS	Vladimir Ilyin (to Krasnodar)
38	DF	RUS	Nikita Karmayev (on loan to Kuban Krasnodar)
47	MF	RUS	Askhab Chunchurov (to Legion Dynamo Makhachkala)
52	GK	RUS	Akhmed Bunkhoyev (to (Albania) Labëria)
74	MF	RUS	Turpal Abzayev (to Chayka Peschanokopskoye)
75	DF	RUS	Abdul-Malik Dzhakuyev
91	MF	RUS	Diamid Khintba (to Krasava Odintsovo)
—	DF	RUS	Pavel Kaloshin (to Irtysh Omsk)
—	MF	POL	Konrad Michalak (on loan to (Turkey) Konyaspor, previously on loan to (Turkey) Çaykur Rizespor)
—	FW	VEN	Andrés Ponce (to (Denmark) Vejle, previously on loan to Rotor Volgograd)
—	FW	ALB	Odise Roshi (to (Turkey) Boluspor, previously on loan to (Hungary) Diósgyőri VTK)
—	FW	RUS	Magomed Mitrishev (released, previously on loan to Chayka Peschanokopskoye)
—	FW	RUS	Idris Umayev (on loan to (Kazakhstan) Shakhter Karagandy, previously on loan to Chayka Peschanokopskoye)

=== Arsenal Tula ===
In: Note: Flags indicate national team as defined under FIFA eligibility rules; some limited exceptions apply. Players may hold more than one non-FIFA nationality.

No.	Pos.	Nation	Player
1	GK	RUS	Anton Kochenkov (from Lokomotiv Moscow)
2	MF	RUS	Ruslan Kambolov (from Krasnodar)
4	DF	SRB	Uroš Radaković (from (Czech Republic) Sparta Prague)
6	DF	RUS	Igor Smolnikov (from Krasnodar)
7	FW	RUS	Yevgeni Markov (from Krasnodar)
9	MF	RUS	Ayaz Guliyev (from Spartak Moscow)
16	DF	SWE	Axel Björnström (from (Sweden) IK Sirius)
19	MF	RUS	Yaroslav Ivakin (from Tver)
22	MF	GEO	Zuriko Davitashvili (from Rubin Kazan)
25	DF	RUS	Danil Stepanov (on loan from Rubin Kazan)
30	FW	ROU	Alexandru Tudorie (end of loan to (Romania) Universitatea Craiova)
40	GK	RUS	Mikhail Ponomarenko (free agent, last with Smolensk)
35	GK	RUS	Daniil Stratan (from Volgar Astrakhan)
47	MF	RUS	Arseny Bronnikov (from Kuban-Holding Pavlovskaya)
57	MF	RUS	Andrei Yakushin (from Khimki)
61	FW	RUS	Aleksei Belyanin
62	FW	RUS	Daniil Antonov
66	DF	RUS	Nikita Poznyak
68	MF	RUS	Yevgeni Polezhayev (from Lokomotiv Moscow academy)
69	FW	RUS	Roman Belov
71	DF	RUS	Aleksandr Denisov (end of loan to Tambov)
75	GK	RUS	Vladimir Tsapurin (from FShM Moscow)
80	DF	RUS	Dmitri Nekrasov
81	MF	RUS	Maksim Zotov
83	MF	RUS	Artyom Gordeyev
84	DF	RUS	Ilya Korotkikh (from UOR #5 Yegoryevsk)
85	GK	RUS	Roman Anikeyev (from UOR #5 Yegoryevsk)
88	DF	RUS	Daniil Gulyayev
89	DF	RUS	Fyodor Dyudyukin
95	MF	RUS	Yuri Yakunin
96	MF	RUS	Ilya Tyorkin
98	MF	RUS	Aleksandr Zyuzin (from SKA Rostov-on-Don)
99	DF	RUS	Ivan Novoseltsev (from Sochi)

Out: Note: Flags indicate national team as defined under FIFA eligibility rules; some limited exceptions apply. Players may hold more than one non-FIFA nationality.

No.	Pos.	Nation	Player
1	GK	RUS	Artur Nigmatullin (to Nizhny Novgorod)
4	DF	GER	Robert Bauer (to (Belgium) Sint-Truiden)
7	MF	RUS	Aleksandr Lomovitsky (end of loan from Spartak Moscow)
8	DF	GEO	Gia Grigalava
9	DF	RUS	Kirill Kombarov (retired)
14	DF	RUS	Anri Khagush
15	MF	BLR	Yury Kavalyow (to Orenburg)
18	MF	BLR	Valery Gromyko (on loan to (Belarus) BATE Borisov)
19	MF	ZAM	Lameck Banda (on loan to (Israel) Maccabi Petah Tikva, previously on loan to (Israel) Maccabi Netanya)
19	FW	MNE	Luka Đorđević (end of loan from Lokomotiv Moscow)
21	MF	RUS	Igor Konovalov (end of loan from Rubin Kazan)
34	GK	RUS	Grigori Kevayev (to Neftekhimik Nizhnekamsk)
37	GK	RUS	Igor Telkov (retired)
39	MF	RUS	Ruslan Kul (to Sokol Saratov)
40	MF	RUS	Artyom Mingazov (to Avangard Kursk)
41	FW	RUS	Denis Lutay (to Arsenal-2 Tula)
45	DF	RUS	Ilya Yermolayev
46	FW	RUS	Maksim Rozhin
53	DF	RUS	Pavel Khodeyev (to Arsenal-2 Tula)
54	DF	RUS	Vyacheslav Vyunkov (to Arsenal-2 Tula)
58	MF	RUS	Timur Lobanov (to Saturn Ramenskoye)
63	MF	RUS	Danila Polyakov (to Kolomna)
66	DF	RUS	Kirill Lomakin (to Khimik Dzerzhinsk)
69	GK	RUS	Pavel Boriskin
85	MF	RUS	Kirill Shekhov (to Khimki-M)
88	MF	RUS	Giorgi Uridia (to Volga Ulyanovsk)
89	MF	RUS	Vladimir Banykin
92	DF	RUS	Nikolai Rasskazov (end of loan from Spartak Moscow)
96	FW	RUS	Aleksandr Konev
97	FW	RUS	David Rudakov
98	FW	RUS	Nikita Prikhodnoy (to Arsenal-2 Tula)
—	FW	RUS	Roman Minayev (to Rotor Volgograd, previously on loan to Tambov)

=== CSKA Moscow ===
In: Note: Flags indicate national team as defined under FIFA eligibility rules; some limited exceptions apply. Players may hold more than one non-FIFA nationality.

No.	Pos.	Nation	Player
6	MF	RUS	Maksim Mukhin (from Lokomotiv Moscow)
25	MF	CRO	Kristijan Bistrović (end of loan to (Turkey) Kasımpaşa)
27	DF	CIV	Cédric Gogoua (end of loan to Rotor Volgograd)
29	MF	SLO	Jaka Bijol (end of loan to (Germany) Hannover 96)
51	MF	RUS	Aleksei Teplyakov (from own academy)
56	MF	RUS	Yaroslav Arbuzov
57	FW	RUS	Marat Tlekhugov (from own academy)
58	MF	RUS	Makar Pestov
69	MF	RUS	Viktor Le
81	FW	RUS	Mikhail Gaynov (from own academy)
89	GK	RUS	Vladimir Brezhnev (from own academy)
91	FW	RUS	Anton Zabolotny (from Sochi)
92	DF	RUS	Yegor Noskov
94	FW	RUS	Stepan Yevsyutin (from own academy)
97	FW	RUS	Mikhail Zabotkin (from Strogino Moscow academy)

Out: Note: Flags indicate national team as defined under FIFA eligibility rules; some limited exceptions apply. Players may hold more than one non-FIFA nationality.

No.	Pos.	Nation	Player
1	GK	RUS	Ilya Pomazun (on loan to Ural Yekaterinburg)
8	MF	CRO	Nikola Vlašić (to (England) West Ham United)
17	MF	ISL	Arnór Sigurðsson (on loan to (Italy) Venezia)
21	FW	ARG	Adolfo Gaich (on loan to (Spain) Huesca, previously on loan to (Italy) Benevento)
22	MF	RUS	Konstantin Maradishvili (to Lokomotiv Moscow)
23	DF	ISL	Hörður Björgvin Magnússon (not registered with the league)
32	FW	VEN	Salomón Rondón (end of loan from (China) Dalian Professional)
51	MF	RUS	Dmitry Begun (to Dynamo Moscow)
52	DF	RUS	Vadim Konyukhov (on loan to Zvezda Perm)
59	MF	RUS	Tigran Avanesyan (on loan to Tekstilshchik Ivanovo, previously on loan to Tambov)
62	DF	RUS	Vadim Karpov (on loan to Tekstilshchik Ivanovo)
65	FW	RUS	Ilya Vostrikov (to Chayka Peschanokopskoye)
70	MF	RUS	Andrei Savinov (on loan to Kairat Moscow)
71	DF	RUS	Nair Tiknizyan (to Lokomotiv Moscow)
76	MF	RUS	Anton Krachkovsky (on loan to Kairat Moscow)
79	MF	RUS	Sergei Pryakhin (on loan to Kairat Moscow)
99	FW	BLR	Ilya Shkurin (on loan to (Ukraine) Dynamo Kyiv)
—	DF	RUS	Nikita Kotin (to Rostov, previously on loan to Irtysh Omsk)
—	DF	RUS	Maksim Yeleyev (on loan to Amkar Perm, previously on loan to Yenisey Krasnoyarsk)
—	MF	RUS	Vitaly Zhironkin (on loan to Volgar Astrakhan, previously on loan to KAMAZ Naberezhnye Chelny)
—	FW	RUS	Gocha Gogrichiani (on loan to Tekstilshchik Ivanovo, previously on loan to Akron Tolyatti)
—	FW	MLI	Lassana N'Diaye (on loan to Tekstilshchik Ivanovo, previously on loan to Veles Moscow)

=== Dynamo Moscow ===
In: Note: Flags indicate national team as defined under FIFA eligibility rules; some limited exceptions apply. Players may hold more than one non-FIFA nationality.

No.	Pos.	Nation	Player
2	DF	URU	Guillermo Varela (from (Denmark) Copenhagen, previously on loan)
5	DF	PAR	Fabián Balbuena (from (England) West Ham United)
15	DF	RUS	Saba Sazonov (from Zenit St. Petersburg)
25	MF	RUS	Denis Makarov (from Rubin Kazan)
26	DF	RUS	Grigori Morozov (end of loan to Ufa)
30	MF	RUS	Anton Terekhov (end of loan to Tambov)
44	DF	RUS	Ilya Kalachyov (end of loan to Neftekhimik Nizhnekamsk)
51	FW	RUS	Aleksandr Grachyov (from Spartak Moscow academy)
52	MF	RUS	Yegor Smelov (from Zenit St. Petersburg academy)
54	FW	RUS	Yuri Tryapichkin (from Konoplyov football academy)
56	DF	RUS	Leon Zaydenzal (from own academy)
57	MF	RUS	Taras Gagloyev
58	DF	RUS	Yevgeni Ibragimov (from own academy)
63	FW	RUS	Stepan Obryvkov (from own academy)
65	FW	RUS	Matvei Kozhin (from own academy)
67	DF	RUS	Roman Tkachuk (from CSKA Moscow academy)
68	FW	RUS	Semyon Loktionov (from own academy)
72	MF	RUS	Roman Yermolin (from own academy)
73	MF	RUS	Artur Kasabov (from own academy)
75	FW	RUS	Mikhail Sidorin (from FShM Moscow)
86	DF	RUS	Richard Golovachyov (from own academy)
93	DF	URU	Diego Laxalt (from (Italy) Milan)
95	FW	RUS	Dmitry Begun (from CSKA Moscow)
96	FW	RUS	Artyom Belikov
97	MF	RUS	Oleg Donskov (from own academy)
98	MF	RUS	Aleksandr Vyaznikov (from own academy)

Out: Note: Flags indicate national team as defined under FIFA eligibility rules; some limited exceptions apply. Players may hold more than one non-FIFA nationality.

No.	Pos.	Nation	Player
5	DF	RUS	Roman Neustädter
11	FW	RUS	Nikolai Komlichenko (on loan to Rostov)
12	MF	RUS	Danil Lipovoy (to Krylia Sovetov Samara)
22	MF	RUS	Igor Shkolik (on loan to Rotor Volgograd)
41	DF	RUS	Matvei Smirnov (to Saturn Ramenskoye)
56	MF	RUS	Matvey Ivakhnov (to (Latvia) Super Nova)
57	MF	RUS	Ilya Gomanyuk (on loan to Volgar Astrakhan)
59	DF	RUS	Daniil Fyodorov (to Zenit-2 St. Petersburg)
63	GK	RUS	Mikhail Yashin
65	MF	RUS	Vladimir Moskvichyov (to Neftekhimik Nizhnekamsk)
77	MF	BFA	Charles Kaboré
79	DF	RUS	Sergei Slepov (on loan to Rotor Volgograd)
82	MF	RUS	Savva Morozov (to Kolomna)
85	DF	RUS	Samuel Adeniyi (to Strogino Moscow academy)
86	DF	RUS	Dmitri Vladimirov (to Olimp-Dolgoprudny-2)
95	GK	RUS	Rasul Mitsayev (to Dynamo Makhachkala)
96	GK	RUS	Vladislav Yarukov (to (Armenia) Noravank)
97	MF	RUS	Ruslan Maltsev (to Veles Moscow)
98	FW	RUS	Roman Dunayev (to Strogino Moscow academy)
—	DF	RUS	Ihor Kalinin (to Ural Yekaterinburg, previously on loan)
—	MF	POR	Miguel Cardoso (to (Turkey) Kayserispor, previously on loan to (Portugal) Belenenses SAD)
—	MF	GEO	Luka Gagnidze (on loan to Ural Yekaterinburg, previously from (Georgia (country)) Dinamo Tbilisi)
—	MF	RUS	Vladislav Karapuzov (on loan to Akhmat Grozny, previously on loan to Tambov)
—	FW	RUS	Maksim Danilin (on loan to Neftekhimik Nizhnekamsk, previously on loan to Dynamo Bryansk)
—	FW	GER	Maximilian Philipp (to (Germany) VfL Wolfsburg, previously on loan)

=== Khimki ===
In: Note: Flags indicate national team as defined under FIFA eligibility rules; some limited exceptions apply. Players may hold more than one non-FIFA nationality.

No.	Pos.	Nation	Player
2	DF	RUS	Maksim Karpov (on loan from Krylia Sovetov Samara)
4	DF	NGR	Brian Idowu (from Lokomotiv Moscow, previously on loan)
7	FW	RUS	Ilya Sadygov (from Olimp-Dolgoprudny)
9	FW	SUI	Kemal Ademi (from (Turkey) Fenerbahçe)
10	FW	RUS	Aleksandr Dolgov (from Rostov, previously on loan)
11	DF	RUS	Elmir Nabiullin (from Sochi)
14	MF	SWE	Besard Šabović (from (Turkey) Kayserispor)
18	MF	RUS	Artyom Sokolov (from Chertanovo Moscow)
21	MF	RUS	Ilya Kamyshev (from Chertanovo Moscow, previously on loan)
27	MF	RUS	David Davidyan (from (Armenia) Alashkert)
29	MF	RUS	Yevgeni Cherkes (from Rostov)
33	DF	SLO	Dušan Stojinović (from (Slovenia) Celje)
35	GK	RUS	Vitali Sychyov (from Tambov)
55	DF	RUS	Aleksei Kolesnikov (from Zenit St. Petersburg academy)
56	MF	RUS	Dmitri Osipov
59	MF	RUS	Timur Musin
60	MF	RUS	Roman Stepanov (from Lokomotiv Moscow academy)
61	DF	RUS	Maksim Ivanov (from Strogino Moscow academy)
62	MF	RUS	Artyom Kiba
63	MF	RUS	Nikita Kuzin
64	DF	RUS	Aleksandr Pukhayev (from Ural Yekaterinburg)
69	MF	RUS	Aleksei Abramov
72	MF	RUS	Artemi Radushinskiy
73	MF	RUS	Aleks Lyao
74	FW	RUS	Yegor Rumyantsev (from Zenit St. Petersburg academy)
77	MF	RUS	Reziuan Mirzov (on loan from Spartak Moscow, previously on loan from same)
79	GK	RUS	Yegor Malyshev
82	DF	RUS	Gleb Rodionov (from Strogino Moscow)
84	DF	RUS	Artyom Yevshintsev
86	FW	RUS	Timur Galimzyanov (from UOR #5 Yegoryevsk)
87	DF	RUS	Kirill Bozhenov (on loan from Rostov, previously to Rostov)
92	DF	RUS	Gleb Zakharchenko (from Lokomotiv Moscow academy)
96	FW	RUS	Karim Sagdeyev
98	GK	RUS	Artyom Meshalkin (from Dynamo Moscow academy)

Out: Note: Flags indicate national team as defined under FIFA eligibility rules; some limited exceptions apply. Players may hold more than one non-FIFA nationality.

No.	Pos.	Nation	Player
1	GK	RUS	Dmitri Khomich (to SKA-Khabarovsk)
2	DF	RUS	Arseny Logashov (end of loan from Rostov)
7	MF	RUS	Gela Zaseyev
9	MF	RUS	Maksim Glushenkov (end of loan from Spartak Moscow)
10	FW	RUS	Kamran Aliyev (on loan to SKA-Khabarovsk)
17	MF	ARM	Arshak Koryan (on loan to Orenburg)
19	FW	CIV	Senin Sebai (to Akhmat Grozny)
28	MF	RUS	Pavel Mogilevets (to Nizhny Novgorod)
33	DF	RUS	Yevgeny Gapon (to (Kazakhstan) Shakhter Karagandy)
37	MF	RUS	Dmitry Malykhin
38	FW	RUS	Ilya Trynko (to Khimki-M)
42	DF	RUS	Mikhail Tikhonov (to Khimki-M)
45	FW	BFA	Mohamed Konaté (to Akhmat Grozny)
46	FW	RUS	Aleksandr Olenyov (to Khimki-M)
55	DF	RUS	Vadim Khromin
56	MF	RUS	Nikita Polshchikov
57	GK	RUS	Makar Ilyushyonok (to Novosibirsk, previously from Zenit St. Petersburg academy)
59	MF	RUS	Georgi Ketov (to Chertanovo Moscow academy)
62	DF	RUS	Vyacheslav Frolov (to Saturn Ramenskoye)
68	FW	RUS	Timofei Tokarev
68	DF	RUS	Ivan Bzikadze (to Znamya Truda Orekhovo-Zuyevo, previously from Tambov)
70	MF	RUS	Andrei Murnin (to Khimik Dzerzhinsk)
71	DF	RUS	Vladimir Shishnin (to Khimki-M)
72	GK	RUS	Semyon Abramov
74	DF	RUS	Maksim Lukyanov
75	FW	RUS	Ilya Predeus (to Saturn Ramenskoye)
75	MF	RUS	Timur Khudogulov (previously from Zvezda St. Petersburg)
77	GK	RUS	Dadu Khidriyev
78	FW	RUS	Danil Massurenko (to Khimki-M)
79	MF	RUS	Vladislav Borzenkov
82	FW	RUS	Grisha Paronyan
84	GK	RUS	Ilya Zaytsev
86	MF	RUS	Andrei Yakushin (to Arsenal Tula)
88	FW	RUS	Vladimir Dyadyun
91	DF	RUS	Danila Kalin (to Khimki-M)
95	FW	RUS	Bogdan Chinaryov
96	DF	RUS	Georgi Kadzhaya (to Torpedo Vladimir)
97	FW	RUS	Sergei Mosiyan (to Biolog-Novokubansk)
98	MF	RUS	Maksim Kostyayev (to Khimik Dzerzhinsk)
—	DF	RUS	Kirill Bolshakov (on loan to Olimp-Dolgoprudny, previously from SKA-Khabarovsk)
—	MF	RUS	Nikita Balakhontsev (on loan to Olimp-Dolgoprudny, previously on loan to Novosibirsk)

=== Krasnodar ===
In: Note: Flags indicate national team as defined under FIFA eligibility rules; some limited exceptions apply. Players may hold more than one non-FIFA nationality.

No.	Pos.	Nation	Player
3	MF	POL	Grzegorz Krychowiak (from Lokomotiv Moscow)
5	DF	SRB	Uroš Spajić (end of loan to (Netherlands) Feyenoord)
9	FW	COL	Jhon Córdoba (from (Germany) Hertha BSC)
28	DF	RUS	Grigory Zhilkin (from own academy)
29	FW	RUS	Vladimir Ilyin (from Akhmat Grozny)
46	DF	RUS	Nikita Samokhin (from own academy)
49	DF	RUS	Ivan Dmitriyev
51	DF	RUS	Artyom Datsenko (from own academy)
54	DF	RUS	Ivan Churikov (from own academy)
59	MF	RUS	Vladislav Yanchenko (from own academy)
62	MF	RUS	Rustam Berzegov (from own academy)
64	MF	RUS	Roman Zashchepkin
65	DF	RUS	Yevgeni Nazarov (end of loan to SKA-Khabarovsk)
68	MF	RUS	Sergei Gonzar
75	MF	RUS	Oleg Korotkov (from own academy)
78	FW	RUS	Artyom Arutyunov (from own academy)
88	MF	RUS	Nikita Krivtsov (from Torpedo Vladimir)
95	FW	RUS	Artyom Shevchenko (from own academy)
97	FW	RUS	Yaroslav Sychyov (from own academy)

Out: Note: Flags indicate national team as defined under FIFA eligibility rules; some limited exceptions apply. Players may hold more than one non-FIFA nationality.

No.	Pos.	Nation	Player
9	FW	RUS	Ari
10	FW	BRA	Wanderson (not registered with the league)
12	GK	RUS	Yegor Baburin (end of loan from Rostov)
14	MF	SWE	Kristoffer Olsson (to (Belgium) Anderlecht)
17	DF	RUS	German Osnov (to Chayka Peschanokopskoye)
19	DF	RUS	Daur Chanba
20	MF	RUS	Ilya Zhigulyov (to (Poland) Zagłębie Lubin, previously on loan to Rotor Volgograd)
20	FW	RUS	Yevgeni Markov (to Arsenal Tula)
21	FW	RUS	Igor Andreyev (on loan to Rodina Moscow)
25	DF	RUS	Maksim Demenko (to Biolog-Novokubansk)
28	DF	RUS	Igor Smolnikov (to Arsenal Tula)
33	FW	SWE	Marcus Berg (to (Sweden) Göteborg)
35	MF	RUS	Sergei Peterson (to Zenit-Izhevsk)
40	DF	RUS	Andrei Ivashin (to Chayka Peschanokopskoye)
41	DF	RUS	Daniil Punegov (to Mashuk-KMV Pyatigorsk)
42	FW	RUS	Nikita Shershnyov (to Mashuk-KMV Pyatigorsk)
46	DF	RUS	Siyovush Khabibulloyev
47	MF	RUS	Daniil Utkin (on loan to Akhmat Grozny)
49	MF	RUS	Stanislav Basyrov
51	FW	RUS	Shamil Mavlyanov (to Mashuk-KMV Pyatigorsk)
54	MF	RUS	Valeri Fomenko (to Vista Gelendzhik)
60	MF	RUS	Andrei Tekuchyov (to Shinnik Yaroslavl)
62	MF	RUS	Fyodor Makarenko
64	FW	RUS	Roman Simonov (to Zenit-Izhevsk)
65	DF	RUS	Nikolai Bochko (to SKA Rostov-on-Don)
68	MF	RUS	Dmitri Kotov (to Dynamo Vladivostok)
75	MF	RUS	Levon Bayramyan (to (Armenia) Alashkert)
76	MF	RUS	Minkail Matsuyev
77	MF	RUS	Ruslan Kambolov (to Arsenal Tula)
83	DF	RUS	Stepan Nikitin (to Mashuk-KMV Pyatigorsk)
87	MF	RUS	Akim Abdokov (to Chernomorets Novorossiysk)
88	DF	RUS	Kirill Fomenko (to Zvezda St. Petersburg)
90	GK	RUS	Nikita Yegyazarov
91	FW	RUS	Arutyun Grigoryan (to Tver)
93	FW	RUS	Magomed-Shapi Suleymanov (on loan to (Turkey) Giresunspor)
95	MF	RUS	Danil Benedyk (to Spartak Nalchik)
96	FW	RUS	Ruslan Rzayev (to Kuban-Holding Pavlovskaya)
—	DF	RUS	Leo Goglichidze (on loan to Ural Yekaterinburg, previously on loan to Nizhny Novgorod)
—	DF	RUS	Igor Paradin (on loan to Mashuk-KMV Pyatigorsk, previously on loan to Chayka Peschanokopskoye)
—	MF	RUS	Ilya Martynov (on loan to Rotor Volgograd, previously on loan to Tambov)
—	FW	RUS	German Onugkha (to (Denmark) Vejle, previously on loan)

=== Krylia Sovetov Samara ===
In: Note: Flags indicate national team as defined under FIFA eligibility rules; some limited exceptions apply. Players may hold more than one non-FIFA nationality.

No.	Pos.	Nation	Player
2	DF	CRO	Silvije Begić (on loan from Rubin Kazan)
9	MF	RUS	Sergei Pinyayev (from Chertanovo Moscow)
13	MF	RUS	Danil Lipovoy (from Dynamo Moscow)
15	MF	RUS	Maksim Glushenkov (on loan from Spartak Moscow)
21	MF	UKR	Dmytro Ivanisenya (from (Ukraine) Zorya Luhansk)
23	DF	NED	Glenn Bijl (from (Netherlands) Emmen)
25	MF	RUS	Danil Prutsev (from Sochi)
43	FW	RUS	Maksim Aronov
53	MF	RUS	Nikolai Maksimov (from Krylia Sovetov-2 Samara)
54	FW	RUS	Sergei Makarov (from Krylia Sovetov-2 Samara)
55	MF	RUS	Artyom Chaly
57	FW	RUS	Rasil Asaydulin
60	FW	RUS	Sergei Knyazkov (from Konoplyov football academy)
61	MF	RUS	Nikita Ostanin (from Konoplyov football academy)
67	DF	RUS	Roman Yermakov (from Krylia Sovetov-2 Samara)
68	FW	RUS	Aleksei Voychenko (from Krylia Sovetov-2 Samara)
71	GK	RUS	Danil Beltyukov (from Krylia Sovetov-2 Samara)
72	DF	RUS	Vladislav Teplyakov
73	MF	RUS	Artyom Bulgakov (from Krylia Sovetov-2 Samara)
76	DF	RUS	Marat Aksanov (from Konoplyov football academy)
80	DF	RUS	Danila Romanov (from Lada-Tolyatti)
82	MF	RUS	Sergei Oliynyk (from Konoplyov football academy)
83	MF	RUS	Karim Aukhadeyev (from Konoplyov football academy)
84	DF	RUS	Yaroslav Grebyonkin (from Konoplyov football academy)
86	FW	RUS	Semyon Vorobyov (from Konoplyov football academy)
87	MF	RUS	Klim Salmin (from Konoplyov football academy)
90	GK	RUS	Vladimir Krasilnikov (from Konoplyov football academy)
92	DF	RUS	Vladimir Yeryomin (from Krylia Sovetov-2 Samara)
93	MF	RUS	Dmitri Motovichyov (from Krylia Sovetov-2 Samara)
95	DF	RUS	Anton Kiselyov (from Krylia Sovetov-2 Samara)
96	FW	RUS	Yegor Totsky (from Krylia Sovetov-2 Samara)
97	DF	RUS	Gevork Elibekyan (from Krylia Sovetov-2 Samara)

Out: Note: Flags indicate national team as defined under FIFA eligibility rules; some limited exceptions apply. Players may hold more than one non-FIFA nationality.

No.	Pos.	Nation	Player
2	DF	RUS	Vladimir Poluyakhtov (to Orenburg)
12	FW	BLR	Sergei Kornilenko (retired)
16	MF	POR	Ricardo Alves (to (Kazakhstan) Kairat)
20	FW	RUS	German Onugkha (end of loan from (Denmark) Vejle, previously on loan)
22	MF	RUS	Dmitry Yefremov (to Akron Tolyatti)
23	DF	RUS	Dmitri Kombarov (retired)
46	MF	RUS	Bakhadur Sokolov
50	DF	RUS	Maksim Karpov (on loan to Khimki)
57	MF	RUS	Vladislav Tyurin (on loan to Tyumen)
62	DF	RUS	Kadyrgali Simbayev (to Krasava, previously from Rubin Kazan academy)
69	FW	RUS	Yegor Golenkov (to (Czech Republic) Sigma Olomouc)
77	MF	IRQ	Safaa Hadi
84	MF	MDA	Alexandru Gațcan (retired)
94	MF	RUS	Stepan Sherstnyov (to Nosta Novotroitsk)
—	MF	RUS	Gennadi Kiselyov (to Torpedo Moscow, previously on loan to Irtysh Omsk)
—	FW	RUS	Dmitri Molchanov (on loan to Dynamo Bryansk, previously on loan to Chertanovo Moscow)

=== Lokomotiv Moscow ===
In: Note: Flags indicate national team as defined under FIFA eligibility rules; some limited exceptions apply. Players may hold more than one non-FIFA nationality.

No.	Pos.	Nation	Player
5	MF	RUS	Konstantin Maradishvili (from CSKA Moscow)
7	FW	NED	Gyrano Kerk (from (Netherlands) Utrecht)
8	MF	FRA	Alexis Beka Beka (from (France) Caen)
10	MF	ENG	Tino Anjorin (on loan from (England) Chelsea)
16	DF	CRO	Tin Jedvaj (from (Germany) Bayer Leverkusen)
24	DF	RUS	Maksim Nenakhov (from Akhmat Grozny)
29	MF	RUS	Kirill Pershin (from UOR #5 Yegoryevsk)
32	DF	RUS	Artemi Kosogorov (from own academy)
33	DF	RUS	Vladimir Sholokh (from own academy)
34	DF	RUS	Maksim Gavrilov (from own academy)
35	GK	RUS	Dmitri Medvedev (from own academy)
37	DF	RUS	Yuri Kudrevaty (from UOR #5 Yegoryevsk)
67	MF	RUS	Vladislav Romantsev (from Kolomna)
68	FW	RUS	Matvey Bogatov (from UOR #5 Yegoryevsk)
70	FW	RUS	Yegor Yeliseyenko (from Strogino Moscow academy)
71	DF	RUS	Nair Tiknizyan (from CSKA Moscow)
76	MF	RUS	Daniil Fomin
79	MF	RUS	Matvey Chekalin (from own academy)
84	MF	RUS	Artyom Borovitsky (from own academy)
90	MF	BLR	Kirill Zinovich (from (Belarus) Minsk)
98	MF	RUS	Dmitri Zavolokin (from own academy)

Out: Note: Flags indicate national team as defined under FIFA eligibility rules; some limited exceptions apply. Players may hold more than one non-FIFA nationality.

No.	Pos.	Nation	Player
4	DF	RUS	Vitali Lystsov (on loan to Akhmat Grozny)
7	MF	POL	Grzegorz Krychowiak (to Krasnodar)
14	DF	CRO	Vedran Ćorluka (retired)
15	MF	RUS	Andrey Nikitin (on loan to Fakel Voronezh, previously on loan there)
19	FW	POR	Eder (to (Saudi Arabia) Al Raed)
20	DF	RUS	Vladislav Ignatyev (to Rubin Kazan)
20	FW	CPV	Zé Luís (not registered with the league)
34	MF	RUS	Sergei Grishkin
35	GK	RUS	Ilya Sukhoruchenko (to Dynamo Bryansk)
38	MF	RUS	Nikolai Titkov (on loan to Orenburg)
48	DF	RUS	Dmitri Sukharev (to Metallurg Lipetsk)
50	MF	RUS	Vladimir Marukhin (to Akron Tolyatti)
67	FW	RUS	Roman Kolmakov
68	MF	RUS	Nikita Iosifov (to (Spain) Villarreal B)
76	MF	RUS	Maksim Mukhin (to CSKA Moscow)
77	GK	RUS	Anton Kochenkov (to Arsenal Tula)
79	MF	RUS	Kirill Nikishin
83	FW	RUS	Denis Valter
84	DF	RUS	Mikhail Lysov (retired)
92	FW	RUS	Mikhail Ageyev (to Ural Yekaterinburg)
98	MF	RUS	Ivan Galanin (to Ural Yekaterinburg)
—	DF	NGR	Brian Idowu (to Khimki, previously on loan)
—	DF	GEO	Solomon Kvirkvelia (released, previously on loan to Rotor Volgograd)
—	FW	MNE	Luka Đorđević (to (Denmark) Vejle, previously on loan to Arsenal Tula)
—	FW	RUS	Denis Faizullin (on loan to Fakel Voronezh, previously on loan to Tom Tomsk)
—	FW	RUS	Timur Suleymanov (to Nizhny Novgorod, previously on loan)

=== Nizhny Novgorod ===
In: Note: Flags indicate national team as defined under FIFA eligibility rules; some limited exceptions apply. Players may hold more than one non-FIFA nationality.

No.	Pos.	Nation	Player
4	DF	HUN	Ákos Kecskés (from (Switzerland) Lugano)
5	DF	ARG	Lucas Masoero (from (Bulgaria) Lokomotiv Plovdiv)
6	DF	UZB	Ibrokhimkhalil Yuldoshev (from (Uzbekistan) Pakhtakor Tashkent)
7	FW	CAN	Richie Ennin (on loan from (Latvia) Spartaks Jūrmala)
11	FW	RUS	Kirill Kosarev (on loan from Rubin Kazan)
13	MF	CMR	Petrus Boumal (from (Turkey) BB Erzurumspor)
15	DF	SRB	Ivan Miladinović (on loan from Sochi)
18	MF	RUS	Pavel Mogilevets (from Khimki)
19	FW	ALB	Bekim Balaj (from (Austria) Sturm Graz)
23	DF	RUS	Daniil Penchikov (from Tom Tomsk)
25	GK	RUS	Artur Nigmatullin (from Arsenal Tula)
31	MF	RUS	Denis Tkachuk (from Orenburg)
32	FW	RUS	Nikita Yakshin
33	GK	RUS	Andrei Sinitsyn (from Akron Tolyatti)
34	DF	RUS	Aleksei Kozlov (from Rostov)
36	FW	RUS	Ivan Bondarenko
38	DF	RUS	Roman Ladenkov
39	MF	RUS	Yegor Gaganin
40	MF	RUS	Anton Makushin
42	MF	RUS	Denis Rakov
45	MF	RUS	Aleksandr Grunichev
46	MF	RUS	Yegor Sinitsyn
48	MF	RUS	Ivan Sutugin
49	MF	RUS	Leonid Yuferov (from Rubin Kazan academy)
50	DF	RUS	Artemi Plakidin
51	GK	RUS	Yegor Lavrentyev
52	DF	RUS	Yegor Pigayev
53	GK	RUS	Matvey Tyurin (from Rubin Kazan)
54	DF	RUS	Mikhail Golov
57	MF	RUS	Ilya Ruzavin
58	MF	RUS	Maksim Shakhov
59	MF	RUS	Danil Vinokurov
93	FW	RUS	Timur Suleymanov (from Lokomotiv Moscow, previously on loan)

Out: Note: Flags indicate national team as defined under FIFA eligibility rules; some limited exceptions apply. Players may hold more than one non-FIFA nationality.

No.	Pos.	Nation	Player
3	DF	RUS	Ismail Ediyev (to Kuban Krasnodar)
5	DF	RUS	Aleksei Shumskikh (to Torpedo Moscow)
6	MF	RUS	Mikhail Gashchenkov (to (Kazakhstan) Akzhayik)
7	DF	RUS	Kirill Malyarov
8	MF	RUS	Artyom Popov (to Baltika Kaliningrad)
10	FW	GUI	Momo Yansané (to (Moldova) Sheriff Tiraspol)
11	DF	RUS	Ivan Temnikov (to Torpedo Moscow)
14	FW	RUS	Mukhammad Sultonov (to Torpedo Moscow)
20	MF	RUS	Pavel Komolov (retired)
23	DF	RUS	Sergei Zuykov (to Tom Tomsk)
56	FW	RUS	Ivan Kalinin (previously from own academy)
61	MF	RUS	Aleksandr Stavpets (to Tom Tomsk)
77	FW	GEO	Beka Kavtaradze (to Rotor Volgograd)
90	GK	RUS	Oleg Smirnov (to Volgar Astrakhan)
91	DF	RUS	Leo Goglichidze (end of loan from Krasnodar)
98	FW	RUS	Dmitri Yugaldin (to Irtysh Omsk)
99	GK	RUS	Nikolai Sysuyev

=== Rostov ===
In: Note: Flags indicate national team as defined under FIFA eligibility rules; some limited exceptions apply. Players may hold more than one non-FIFA nationality.

No.	Pos.	Nation	Player
1	GK	RUS	Yegor Baburin (end of loan to Krasnodar)
13	DF	RUS	Ihor Kalinin (from Ural Yekaterinburg)
16	DF	ANG	Bastos (on loan from (Saudi Arabia) Al-Ain)
22	FW	GAM	Ali Sowe (from (Bulgaria) CSKA Sofia, previously on loan)
24	DF	RUS	Konstantin Kovalyov (end of loan to Baltika Kaliningrad)
27	FW	RUS	Nikolai Komlichenko (on loan from Dynamo Moscow)
31	FW	RUS	Danila Proshlyakov (end of loan to Veles Moscow)
41	DF	RUS	Artur Maksetsov (from Zenit St. Petersburg academy)
42	DF	RUS	Nikita Kotin (from CSKA Moscow)
57	MF	RUS	Maksim Martyanov (from Zenit St. Petersburg academy)
59	MF	RUS	Vladislav Kholmanskikh (from Zenit St. Petersburg academy)
74	FW	RUS	Narek Manukyan (on loan from Kaluga)
77	GK	RUS	Maksim Rudakov (end of loan to Rotor Volgograd)
85	MF	RUS	Dmitri Serebryakov (from own academy)
88	MF	RUS	Kirill Shchetinin (on loan from Zenit St. Petersburg)
96	DF	RUS	Eddi Tsanava (from Tambov)

Out: Note: Flags indicate national team as defined under FIFA eligibility rules; some limited exceptions apply. Players may hold more than one non-FIFA nationality.

No.	Pos.	Nation	Player
2	DF	NOR	Haitam Aleesami (to (Cyprus) Apollon Limassol)
3	DF	RUS	Tomas Rukas (on loan to Yenisey Krasnoyarsk)
9	FW	MKD	David Toshevski (on loan to (Poland) Górnik Zabrze, previously on loan to Tambov)
13	FW	RUS	Vladimir Obukhov (released after doping ban)
14	DF	RUS	Kirill Bozhenov (on loan to Khimki, previously from Khimki)
17	MF	NOR	Mathias Normann (on loan to (England) Norwich City)
21	MF	RUS	Georgi Makhatadze (to Rotor Volgograd)
22	DF	BLR	Aleksandr Pavlovets (on loan to (Ukraine) Kolos Kovalivka)
26	MF	RUS	Aleksandr Saplinov (on loan to Ufa)
34	DF	RUS	Aleksei Kozlov (to Nizhny Novgorod)
41	DF	RUS	David Beryozov (to Alania-2 Vladikavkaz)
53	MF	RUS	Alan Gioyev (to Alania-2 Vladikavkaz)
57	MF	RUS	Nikita Kolotievskiy (on loan to Olimp-Dolgoprudny-2)
58	MF	RUS	Tamaz Topuriya (on loan to SKA Rostov-on-Don)
59	FW	RUS	Aleksandr Fuks (to Strogino Moscow)
63	FW	RUS	Lev Popov
66	MF	RUS	Vilyam Rogava
74	MF	RUS	Nikita Kupriyanov (on loan to SKA Rostov-on-Don)
79	GK	RUS	Daniil Frolkin (to Chernomorets Novorossiysk)
82	FW	RUS	Maksim Stavtsev (to own academy)
85	MF	RUS	Daniil Sedov (to Druzhba Maykop)
91	DF	RUS	Ruslan Bezrukov (to SKA Rostov-on-Don)
94	GK	RUS	Vadim Lukyanov (on loan to Volga Ulyanovsk)
96	DF	RUS	Aleksandr Gapechkin (to (Latvia) Valmiera)
—	DF	RUS	Dmitri Chistyakov (to Zenit St. Petersburg, previously on loan)
—	DF	RUS	Arseny Logashov (to Kuban Krasnodar, previously on loan to Khimki)
—	DF	RUS	Danila Prokhin (from Zenit St. Petersburg, on loan to Sochi)
—	DF	RUS	Aleksandr Smirnov (on loan to SKA-Khabarovsk, previously on loan to Orenburg)
—	MF	RUS	Yevgeni Cherkes (to Khimki, previously on loan to Forte Taganrog)
—	MF	RUS	Mikhail Osinov (on loan to Olimp-Dolgoprudny-2, previously on loan to Mashuk-KMV Pyatigorsk)
—	FW	RUS	Aleksandr Dolgov (to Khimki, previously on loan)
—	FW	RUS	Artur Sokhiyev (released, previously on loan to Yessentuki)

=== Rubin Kazan ===
In: Note: Flags indicate national team as defined under FIFA eligibility rules; some limited exceptions apply. Players may hold more than one non-FIFA nationality.

No.	Pos.	Nation	Player
3	DF	TUN	Montassar Talbi (from (Italy) Benevento)
10	FW	RUS	German Onugkha (on loan from (Denmark) Vejle)
11	FW	DEN	Anders Dreyer (from (Denmark) Midtjylland)
20	DF	RUS	Vladislav Ignatyev (from Lokomotiv Moscow)
24	DF	RUS	Ivan Savitskiy (from Leningradets Leningrad Oblast)
41	DF	RUS	Samir Gasanov (from own academy)
42	MF	RUS	Aleksei Zakharov (from own academy)
51	DF	RUS	Ilya Rozhkov (from own academy)
52	DF	RUS	Daniil Konstantinov (from own academy)
53	DF	RUS	Danil Kucheryavenko
58	MF	RUS	Denis Mikhaylov (from own academy)
74	DF	RUS	Kirill Parshin (from own academy)
75	GK	RUS	Ivan Konovalov (end of loan to Ural Yekaterinburg)
81	FW	RUS	Adel Teshkin (from own academy)
83	DF	RUS	Ebert Belorusov (from own academy)
86	GK	RUS	Nikita Korets (from own academy)
93	GK	RUS	Aleksei Gorodovoy (end of loan to SKA-Khabarovsk)
97	DF	RUS	Konstantin Nizhegorodov (from (Germany) Hansa Rostock U19)
99	FW	MNE	Sead Hakšabanović (from (Sweden) Norrköping)

Out: Note: Flags indicate national team as defined under FIFA eligibility rules; some limited exceptions apply. Players may hold more than one non-FIFA nationality.

No.	Pos.	Nation	Player
2	DF	SWE	Carl Starfelt (to (Scotland) Celtic)
3	DF	RUS	Mikhail Merkulov (to (Croatia) Rijeka)
4	DF	CRO	Silvije Begić (on loan to Krylia Sovetov Samara)
10	MF	SUI	Darko Jevtić (on loan to (Greece) AEK Athens)
16	MF	JPN	Mitsuki Saito (not registered with the league, previously recovery from injury)
25	MF	RUS	Denis Makarov (to Dynamo Moscow)
27	DF	RUS	Aleksei Gritsayenko (on loan to Kuban Krasnodar)
40	DF	RUS	Bogdan Mikhaylichenko (to Saturn Ramenskoye)
41	DF	RUS	Mikhail Smolyakov (to Rotor-2 Volgograd)
42	DF	RUS	Saveli Ratnikov (to Irtysh Omsk)
43	FW	RUS	Ivan Sergeyev (to Kaluga)
52	MF	RUS	Denis Sabusov
53	FW	RUS	Anzor Amiraliyev (to Sochi)
58	MF	RUS	Nikolai Yermolayev
64	GK	RUS	Arseni Vertkov (on loan to Peresvet Podolsk)
68	MF	RUS	Aleksandr Ryzhkov (to Znamya Noginsk)
71	GK	RUS	Matvey Tyurin (to Nizhny Novgorod)
74	MF	RUS	Aristarkh Mosin
76	MF	RUS	Nikita Makarov
81	GK	RUS	Danila Svetov
86	DF	RUS	Vyacheslav Fomin (to Amkar Perm)
92	FW	RUS	Anton Sholokh (to Nosta Novotroitsk)
98	DF	RUS	Artur Koloskov (to Baltika-BFU Kaliningrad)
—	DF	RUS	Ilya Agapov (to Spartak Moscow, previously on loan to Neftekhimik Nizhnekamsk)
—	DF	RUS	Vladislav Mikushin (to Yenisey Krasnoyarsk, previously on loan to Leningradets Leningrad Oblast)
—	MF	GEO	Zuriko Davitashvili (to Arsenal Tula, previously on loan to Rotor Volgograd)
—	DF	RUS	Danil Stepanov (on loan to Arsenal Tula, previously on loan to Rotor Volgograd)
—	MF	RUS	Igor Konovalov (on loan to Akhmat Grozny, previously on loan to Arsenal Tula)
—	MF	RUS	Kamil Zakirov (to Dynamo St. Petersburg, previously on loan to (Latvia) Noah Jūrmala, previously on loan to (Belarus) Minsk)
—	FW	RUS	Kirill Klimov (on loan to Kuban Krasnodar, previously on loan to Tambov)
—	FW	RUS	Kirill Kosarev (on loan to Nizhny Novgorod, previously on loan to (Croatia) Hrvatski Dragovoljac, previously on loan to Tom Tomsk)

=== Sochi ===
In: Note: Flags indicate national team as defined under FIFA eligibility rules; some limited exceptions apply. Players may hold more than one non-FIFA nationality.

No.	Pos.	Nation	Player
4	DF	CRO	Mateo Barać (from (Austria) Rapid Wien)
5	DF	BRA	Rodrigão (from (Portugal) Gil Vicente)
7	FW	RUS	Dmitry Vorobyov (on loan from Orenburg)
13	DF	RUS	Sergei Terekhov (from Orenburg, previously on loan)
19	MF	CIV	Victorien Angban (from (France) Metz)
20	DF	RUS	Igor Yurganov (end of loan to Baltika Kaliningrad)
30	FW	COL	Mateo Cassierra (from (Portugal) Belenenses SAD)
39	DF	RUS	Denis Fedorenko (from Baltika-BFU Kaliningrad)
41	MF	RUS	Yegor Saygushev (from Spartak Moscow)
42	FW	RUS	Sergei Berezhnoy
43	DF	RUS	Daniil Afanasyev (from Krasnodar academy)
54	DF	RUS	Artur Kuskov (from CSKA Moscow academy)
56	DF	RUS	Dmitri Kumsarov (from Rostov academy)
57	MF	RUS	Amur Khatsukov
58	MF	RUS	Maksim Khachatryan
61	GK	RUS	Timofey Kashintsev (from CSKA Moscow academy)
62	MF	RUS	Vitali Fyodorov (from Rostov academy)
64	MF	RUS	Rodion Rakhmanin
65	MF	RUS	Vyacheslav Tolmachyov
68	FW	RUS	Zakhar Fyodorov
73	MF	RUS	Nikita Shelest
74	DF	RUS	Artyom Yamangulov (from Konoplyov football academy)
78	MF	RUS	Aleksandr Alyoshin (from Krasnodar academy)
79	MF	RUS	Anzor Amiraliyev (from Rubin Kazan)
81	DF	RUS	Georgi Tunguliyadi (from Lokomotiv Moscow academy)
87	DF	RUS	Danila Prokhin (on loan from Rostov, previously on loan from Zenit St. Petersburg)
90	DF	RUS	Pavel Shakuro (end of loan to Irtysh Omsk)

Out: Note: Flags indicate national team as defined under FIFA eligibility rules; some limited exceptions apply. Players may hold more than one non-FIFA nationality.

No.	Pos.	Nation	Player
3	DF	RUS	Elmir Nabiullin (to Khimki)
7	MF	RUS	Danil Prutsev (to Krylia Sovetov Samara)
9	FW	RUS	Anton Zabolotny (to CSKA Moscow)
23	DF	SLO	Miha Mevlja (to (Turkey) Alanyaspor)
25	DF	RUS	Ivan Novoseltsev (to Arsenal Tula)
39	DF	RUS	Renat Balkizov (to Zenit-Izhevsk)
41	GK	RUS	Sergey Samok (on loan to SKA-Khabarovsk)
42	MF	RUS	Nikita Gubin (to Lada-Tolyatti)
43	DF	RUS	Denis Kalmykov
45	DF	SRB	Ivan Miladinović (on loan to Nizhny Novgorod)
56	DF	RUS	Vadim Milyutin (on loan to (Belarus) Dynamo Brest)
57	DF	RUS	Maksim Grebenyov (to Peresvet Podolsk)
58	MF	RUS	Aleksei Mikhaylov (to Master-Saturn Yegoryevsk)
61	GK	RUS	Denis Terekhov
68	MF	RUS	Islam Mokayev (to Baltika-BFU Kaliningrad)
73	MF	RUS	Yegor Prutsev (on loan to Tekstilshchik Ivanovo)
74	MF	RUS	Maksim Ilyin
78	DF	RUS	Yevgeni Antonov
79	FW	RUS	Aleksandr Rudenko (end of loan from Spartak Moscow)
98	MF	ARM	Erik Vardanyan (on loan to (Armenia) Pyunik)
—	MF	RUS	Nikita Koldunov (to Zenit Saint Petersburg, previously on loan)
—	MF	NGR	Muhammad Ladan (released, previously on loan to (Armenia) Pyunik)
—	MF	RUS	Anatoli Nemchenko (on loan to Olimp-Dolgoprudny-2, previously on loan to Olimp-Dolgoprudny)

=== Spartak Moscow ===
In: Note: Flags indicate national team as defined under FIFA eligibility rules; some limited exceptions apply. Players may hold more than one non-FIFA nationality.

No.	Pos.	Nation	Player
3	DF	BEL	Maximiliano Caufriez (from (Belgium) Sint-Truiden)
8	MF	NGR	Victor Moses (from (England) Chelsea, previously on loan)
17	MF	RUS	Aleksandr Lomovitsky (end of loan to Arsenal Tula)
21	MF	RUS	Georgi Melkadze (end of loan to Akhmat Grozny)
28	MF	RUS	Daniil Zorin (from own academy)
37	DF	RUS	Timofey Danilov (from own academy)
41	DF	RUS	Dmitri Kuroshev (from Zenit St. Petersburg academy)
42	DF	RUS	Artyom Gutsa (from Master-Saturn Yegoryevsk academy)
59	MF	RUS	Danil Shilov (from own academy)
61	DF	RUS	Nikita Bozov (from own academy)
62	FW	RUS	Maksim Ofitserov
66	MF	RUS	Fayziddin Nazhmov (from own academy)
67	FW	RUS	Aleksandr Komissarov (from Lokomotiv Moscow academy)
69	MF	RUS	Andrey Ishutin (from own academy)
78	FW	RUS	Maksim Danilin (end of loan to (Armenia) Noah)
79	FW	RUS	Aleksandr Rudenko (end of loan to Sochi)
86	DF	RUS	Ilya Agapov (from Rubin Kazan)
87	FW	RUS	Svyatoslav Kozhedub (end of loan to (Latvia) Valmiera)
92	DF	RUS	Nikolai Rasskazov (end of loan to Arsenal Tula)
93	FW	RUS	Artyom Bykovskiy (from Master-Saturn Yegoryevsk academy)

Out: Note: Flags indicate national team as defined under FIFA eligibility rules; some limited exceptions apply. Players may hold more than one non-FIFA nationality.

No.	Pos.	Nation	Player
15	MF	RUS	Maksim Glushenkov (on loan to Krylia Sovetov Samara, previously on loan to Khimki)
17	DF	RUS	Georgi Tigiyev
30	GK	ITA	Andrea Romagnoli (to (Italy) Catanzaro)
33	MF	CZE	Alex Král (on loan to (England) West Ham United)
45	FW	RUS	Yegor Loshkov (to Avangard Kursk)
46	MF	RUS	Artur Tumanyan
48	MF	RUS	Yegor Saygushev (to Sochi)
61	DF	RUS	Ilya Golosov (on loan to Rotor Volgograd)
69	MF	RUS	Aleksandr Bezchasnyuk (to SKA Rostov-on-Don)
77	MF	RUS	Reziuan Mirzov (on loan to Khimki, previously on loan to same)
86	FW	RUS	Timur Osmolovskiy
87	MF	RUS	Ayaz Guliyev (to Arsenal Tula)
88	MF	RUS	Aleksandr Tashayev (to Rotor Volgograd)
93	DF	RUS	Nikita Morgunov (on loan to Tyumen)
99	FW	BRA	Pedro Rocha (on loan to (Brazil) Athletico Paranaense)
—	MF	NED	Guus Til (on loan to (Netherlands) Feyenoord, previously on loan to (Germany) SC Freiburg)
—	MF	RUS	Artyom Timofeyev (to Akhmat Grozny, previously on loan)

=== Ufa ===
In: Note: Flags indicate national team as defined under FIFA eligibility rules; some limited exceptions apply. Players may hold more than one non-FIFA nationality.

No.	Pos.	Nation	Player
1	GK	RUS	Aleksey Kuznetsov (from Dynamo Bryansk)
6	MF	RUS	Ruslan Fishchenko (from Veles Moscow)
7	DF	RUS	Azer Aliyev (from Tambov)
9	FW	RUS	Gamid Agalarov (end of loan to Volgar Astrakhan)
15	DF	RUS	Erving Joe Botaka-Ioboma (from Veles Moscow)
23	MF	ANG	Egas Cacintura (from Novaya Generatsiya futsal)
25	MF	RUS	Aleksandr Saplinov (on loan from Rostov)
32	DF	AUT	Moritz Bauer (from (England) Stoke City, previously on loan)
44	DF	RUS	Yuri Zhuravlyov (from Volgar Astrakhan)
47	FW	RUS	Ilnur Gabdullin (from Rubin Kazan academy)
67	MF	RUS	Marat Yagafarov
70	MF	RUS	Timur Shaymiyev
72	DF	RUS	Islam Tursunov
74	MF	RUS	Arsen Khabibrakhmanov
76	MF	RUS	Nikita Slobozhanin
78	MF	RUS	Aleksei Kovyazin
79	DF	RUS	Emil Salikhov
80	FW	RUS	Migran Ageyan
82	DF	RUS	Kirill Antropov
83	MF	RUS	Iskander Gilmanov
84	MF	RUS	Georgi Dementyev
85	DF	RUS	Damir Yerzin
86	MF	RUS	Dmitri Zagretdinov
87	DF	RUS	Nikita Kislyakov
89	MF	RUS	Radmir Nugumanov
92	DF	RUS	Danil Farkhutdinov
93	MF	RUS	Devid Khanov
95	FW	RUS	Timofei Chernikov

Out: Note: Flags indicate national team as defined under FIFA eligibility rules; some limited exceptions apply. Players may hold more than one non-FIFA nationality.

No.	Pos.	Nation	Player
1	GK	RUS	Aleksey Chernov (to (Denmark) Vejle)
2	DF	RUS	Grigori Morozov (end of loan from Dynamo Moscow)
3	DF	RUS	Pavel Alikin (to Rodina Moscow)
7	MF	RUS	Dmitri Sysuyev (to Saransk)
8	MF	BDI	Parfait Bizoza (to (Denmark) Vendsyssel)
16	GK	RUS	Yury Shafinsky
18	FW	SRB	Komnen Andrić (end of loan from (Croatia) Dinamo Zagreb)
21	FW	RUS	Magomedemin Rabadanov (to Krasava Odintsovo)
27	DF	RUS	Oleg Dzantiyev (not registered with the league)
34	DF	RUS	Turgay Mokhbaliyev (to Rotor-2 Volgograd)
46	FW	RUS	Nikita Komendantov
47	FW	RUS	Yevgeni Yegorov (to Krasava Odintsovo)
48	FW	RUS	Artyom Konovalov
50	MF	RUS	Konstantin Kovalchuk
55	DF	GEO	Jemal Tabidze (not registered with the league)
61	GK	RUS	Igor Maltsev
62	GK	RUS	Aleksandr Zharovskikh
64	MF	RUS	Nikita Mashko (to Lada-Tolyatti)
65	DF	RUS	Ivan Mikhaylov
66	MF	RUS	Artyom Pikarev (to Dynamo St. Petersburg)
67	FW	RUS	Dmitri Prokofyev
73	DF	RUS	Vladimir Yeliseyev (to Krymteplytsia Molodizhne)
76	MF	RUS	Oskar Bashirov
80	DF	RUS	Dmitri Malyshev
82	MF	RUS	Nikita Belousov (on loan to Spartak Tuymazy, previously on loan to Shinnik Yaroslavl)
83	DF	RUS	Aleksei Yeliseyev
85	DF	RUS	Ilya Shudrov (to Saturn Ramenskoye)
92	MF	RUS	Lev Safronov
95	FW	RUS	Arseni Zhugin (to Spartak Tuymazy)
96	FW	RUS	Daud Garifullin (to Spartak Tuymazy)
—	MF	RUS	Igor Bezdenezhnykh (to Kuban Krasnodar, previously on loan to Chayka Peschanokopskoye)
—	MF	RUS	Nikolai Giorgobiani (to Alania Vladikavkaz, previously on loan)
—	MF	RUS	Danila Yemelyanov (on loan to Neftekhimik Nizhnekamsk, previously on loan to Volgar Astrakhan)

=== Ural Yekaterinburg ===
In: Note: Flags indicate national team as defined under FIFA eligibility rules; some limited exceptions apply. Players may hold more than one non-FIFA nationality.

No.	Pos.	Nation	Player
1	GK	RUS	Ilya Pomazun (on loan from CSKA Moscow)
9	FW	RUS	Mikhail Ageyev (from Lokomotiv Moscow)
13	GK	RUS	Dmitry Landakov (from Ural-2 Yekaterinburg)
14	MF	RUS	Yuri Zheleznov (from Saturn Ramenskoye)
24	MF	RUS	Kirill Kolesnichenko (from (Kazakhstan) Kairat)
29	DF	RUS	Artyom Mamin (end of loan to Tom Tomsk, previously on loan to Chayka Peschanokopskoye, previously on loan to Orenburg)
34	MF	GEO	Luka Gagnidze (on loan from Dynamo Moscow)
41	MF	RUS	Nikita Zuykov
42	DF	RUS	Yegor Mosin (from UOR #5 Yegoryevsk)
43	MF	RUS	Yury Permyakov
45	DF	RUS	Matvei Anikin
46	MF	RUS	Vladislav Bulatov
47	MF	RUS	Dmitri Osipov
48	MF	RUS	Artyom Komarov (from Zenit St. Petersburg academy)
52	MF	RUS	Maksim Podluzhny
61	DF	RUS	Aleksey Lopatin (from Chertanovo Education Center)
63	DF	RUS	Mikhail Nenashev (from UOR #5 Yegoryevsk)
68	GK	RUS	Mikhail Gaydash (from Lokomotiv Moscow academy)
69	GK	RUS	Stepan Permyakov
76	DF	RUS	Dmitri Mamchich
80	MF	RUS	Ivan Galanin (from Lokomotiv Moscow)
82	MF	RUS	Denis Melyokhin
84	MF	RUS	Semyon Romashov
85	DF	RUS	Viktor Kozyrev (from Smolensk)
88	DF	RUS	Artyom Shmykov (from Irtysh Omsk)
—	DF	RUS	Leo Goglichidze (on loan from Krasnodar)

Out: Note: Flags indicate national team as defined under FIFA eligibility rules; some limited exceptions apply. Players may hold more than one non-FIFA nationality.

No.	Pos.	Nation	Player
4	DF	NOR	Stefan Strandberg (to (Italy) Salernitana)
8	MF	RUS	Roman Yemelyanov (not registered with the league)
9	FW	RUS	Pavel Pogrebnyak
13	DF	RUS	Ihor Kalinin (to Rostov, previously from Dynamo Moscow, previously on loan)
26	MF	RUS	Anton Chebykin (to Ural-2 Yekaterinburg)
28	MF	RUS	Yuri Bavin (on loan to Rotor Volgograd, previously on loan to Tambov)
28	GK	RUS	Ivan Konovalov (end of loan from Rubin Kazan)
37	GK	RUS	Dmitri Lebedev
38	DF	RUS	Danila Zaysunov
39	DF	RUS	Aleksandr Pukhayev (to Khimki)
41	DF	RUS	Nikita Kuznetsov
42	MF	RUS	Konstantin Sysoyev
43	MF	RUS	Aleksandr Golubtsov (to Amkar Perm)
47	MF	RUS	Aleksei Bulka
48	DF	RUS	Roman Silman
49	DF	RUS	Kirill Gurov
50	DF	RUS	Ilya Nasonkin
52	FW	RUS	Igor Voronin
58	MF	NED	Othman El Kabir
61	MF	RUS	Aleksandr Chernyshyov
63	MF	RUS	Artyom Suyetin
66	DF	RUS	Kirill Dervenyov
67	MF	RUS	Pavel Makarov (to Ural-2 Yekaterinburg)
68	FW	RUS	Ilya Grinyuk
70	MF	RUS	Anatoli Anisimov (to Veles Moscow)
71	FW	RUS	Daniil Arsentyev (to Ural-2 Yekaterinburg)
75	DF	RUS	Nikita Chistyakov (on loan to Akron Tolyatti)
76	GK	RUS	Ilya Ignatyev (to Torpedo Miass)
77	GK	RUS	Oleg Baklov (on loan to KAMAZ Naberezhnye Chelny)
82	FW	RUS	Danil Vorobyov
84	DF	RUS	Arsen Agakhanov (to Torpedo Miass)
86	GK	RUS	Maksim Moskovets
95	DF	RUS	Chingiz Magomadov (on loan to KAMAZ Naberezhnye Chelny)
98	DF	RUS	Islamzhan Nasyrov (on loan to Tyumen)
—	GK	RUS	Vladislav Poletayev (on loan to Orenburg, previously on loan to Irtysh Omsk)
—	MF	RUS	Aleksandr Galimov (on loan to SKA-Khabarovsk, previously on loan to Yenisey Krasnoyarsk)
—	MF	RUS	Artyom Shabolin (on loan to Orenburg, previously on loan to Yenisey Krasnoyarsk)
—	FW	RUS	David Karayev (on loan to SKA-Khabarovsk, previously on loan to (Kazakhstan) Caspiy)

=== Zenit Saint Petersburg ===
In: Note: Flags indicate national team as defined under FIFA eligibility rules; some limited exceptions apply. Players may hold more than one non-FIFA nationality.

No.	Pos.	Nation	Player
1	GK	RUS	Stanislav Kritsyuk (from (Portugal) Gil Vicente)
2	DF	RUS	Dmitri Chistyakov (from Rostov, previously on loan)
11	MF	BRA	Claudinho (from (Brazil) Red Bull Bragantino)
32	FW	RUS	Pavel Dolgov (previously to Amkar Perm)
36	DF	RUS	Dmitri Bykov
51	DF	RUS	Yelisey Yemelyanov
54	DF	RUS	Ilya Kirsh (from own academy)
60	MF	RUS	Kirill Stolbov (from own academy)
61	GK	RUS	Bogdan Moskvichyov (from own academy)
67	DF	RUS	Artyom Malenkikh
68	FW	RUS	Ivan Korshunov (end of loan to Irtysh Omsk)
97	MF	RUS	Nikita Koldunov (from Sochi, previously on loan)

Out: Note: Flags indicate national team as defined under FIFA eligibility rules; some limited exceptions apply. Players may hold more than one non-FIFA nationality.

No.	Pos.	Nation	Player
11	FW	ARG	Sebastián Driussi (to (United States) Austin)
18	DF	RUS	Yuri Zhirkov
36	FW	RUS	Stanislav Krapukhin (to (Latvia) Riga)
39	DF	RUS	Vasili Zapryagayev (to Zenit-2 Saint Petersburg)
45	MF	RUS	Dmitri Sergeyev (on loan to Baltika Kaliningrad)
46	FW	RUS	Nikita Simdyankin (to Zenit-2 Saint Petersburg)
47	DF	RUS	Valentin Solodarenko (end of loan from Tuapse)
54	DF	RUS	Saba Sazonov (to Dynamo Moscow)
56	MF	RUS	Igor Vorobyov (to SKA-Khabarovsk)
60	MF	RUS	Daniil Knyazev (on loan to Baltika-BFU Kaliningrad)
62	MF	RUS	Maksim Levin (to Zvezda Saint Petersburg)
67	MF	RUS	Yaroslav Mikhailov (on loan to (Germany) Schalke 04)
75	DF	RUS	Sergei Chibisov (to Yenisey Krasnoyarsk)
81	MF	RUS	Kirill Shchetinin (on loan to Rostov)
82	FW	RUS	Ivan Tarasov (to Zenit-2 Saint Petersburg)
83	MF	RUS	Georgi Chelidze
86	GK	RUS	Nikolai Rybikov (on loan to Chayka Peschanokopskoye)
89	GK	RUS	Maksim Timofeyev (to Zenit-2 Saint Petersburg)
90	FW	RUS	Aleksandr Yelovskikh (to Krasava Odintsovo)
92	FW	RUS	Daniil Shamkin (on loan to Baltika Kaliningrad)
93	FW	RUS	Mikhail Pogorelov (to Olimp-Dolgoprudny)
97	DF	RUS	Islam Zhilov (to Mashuk-KMV Pyatigorsk)
98	DF	RUS	Vladislav Masalsky (to Zenit-2 Saint Petersburg)
99	GK	RUS	Andrey Lunyov (to (Germany) Bayer Leverkusen)
—	DF	RUS	Danila Prokhin (to Rostov, previously on loan to Sochi)
—	MF	RUS	Sergei Ivanov (to Zenit-2 St. Petersburg, previously on loan to (Slovakia) Zemplín Michalovce)
—	FW	ARG	Emiliano Rigoni (to (Brazil) São Paulo, previously on loan at (Spain) Elche)
