= List of Russian football transfers winter 2021–22 =

This is a list of Russian football transfers in the 2021–22 winter transfer window by club. Only clubs of the 2021–22 Russian Premier League are included.

== Russian Premier League 2021–22 ==
=== Akhmat Grozny ===
In: Note: Flags indicate national team as defined under FIFA eligibility rules; some limited exceptions apply. Players may hold more than one non-FIFA nationality.

No.	Pos.	Nation	Player
9	FW	RUS	Idris Umayev (end of loan to (Kazakhstan) Shakhter Karagandy)
25	MF	RUS	Aleksandr Troshechkin (from Khimki)
61	MF	RUS	Murad Murtazaliyev
74	MF	RUS	Daniil Turishchev
87	MF	RUS	Musa Bazhayev
91	MF	RUS	Magomed-Emi Iriskhanov

Out: Note: Flags indicate national team as defined under FIFA eligibility rules; some limited exceptions apply. Players may hold more than one non-FIFA nationality.

No.	Pos.	Nation	Player
6	MF	RUS	Amir Aduyev (on loan to (Kazakhstan) Shakhter Karagandy)
9	MF	ROU	Gabriel Iancu (on loan to (Romania) Farul Constanța)
14	MF	UKR	Artem Polyarus (to (Poland) Bruk-Bet Termalica Nieciecza)
74	DF	RUS	Askhab Usumov
75	DF	RUS	Selim Abdulmuslimov
76	DF	RUS	Akhmed Eldiyev
—	MF	BRA	Ravanelli (to (Brazil) São Bernardo, previously on loan to (Brazil) Chapecoense)
—	FW	SEN	Ablaye Mbengue (to (Israel) Maccabi Petah Tikva, previously on loan to (Belarus) Dinamo Minsk)

=== Arsenal Tula ===
In: Note: Flags indicate national team as defined under FIFA eligibility rules; some limited exceptions apply. Players may hold more than one non-FIFA nationality.

No.	Pos.	Nation	Player
25	DF	RUS	Danil Stepanov (from Rubin Kazan, previously on loan)
28	FW	SRB	Đorđe Despotović (from Rubin Kazan)
63	DF	RUS	Maksim Sukhobetsky
66	DF	RUS	Denis Vaytekhovich
71	MF	RUS	Yegor Saygushev (from Sochi)
74	DF	RUS	Kirill Morunov
90	MF	RUS	Yegor Dorofeyev
92	FW	RUS	Daniil Goncharov
94	FW	RUS	German Zabelin
98	FW	RUS	Artyom Saushkin

Out: Note: Flags indicate national team as defined under FIFA eligibility rules; some limited exceptions apply. Players may hold more than one non-FIFA nationality.

No.	Pos.	Nation	Player
2	MF	RUS	Ruslan Kambolov (to (Kazakhstan) Aktobe)
16	MF	SWE	Axel Björnström (to (Sweden) AIK)
22	FW	GEO	Zuriko Davitashvili
30	FW	ROU	Alexandru Tudorie (to (Romania) Sepsi OSK)
40	GK	RUS	Mikhail Ponomarenko
43	MF	RUS	Yegor Kudinov (to (Belarus) Shakhtyor Petrikov)
62	FW	RUS	Daniil Antonov
64	MF	RUS	Emrakh Nabatov (to Avangard Kursk)
71	DF	RUS	Aleksandr Denisov (to SKA-Khabarovsk)
82	MF	RUS	Daniil Khlusevich (to Spartak Moscow)
90	DF	RUS	Aleksandr Dovbnya (to (Kazakhstan) Kyzylzhar)
94	FW	RUS	Danila Strelchuk (to SKA Rostov-on-Don)
98	MF	RUS	Aleksandr Zyuzin
99	DF	RUS	Ivan Novoseltsev
—	MF	BLR	Valery Gromyko (to (Belarus) BATE Borisov, previously on loan)

=== CSKA Moscow ===
In: Note: Flags indicate national team as defined under FIFA eligibility rules; some limited exceptions apply. Players may hold more than one non-FIFA nationality.

No.	Pos.	Nation	Player
8	MF	COL	Jorge Carrascal (on loan from (Argentina) River Plate)
23	DF	ISL	Hörður Björgvin Magnússon (return from injury)
27	MF	CIV	Jean-Philippe Gbamin (on loan from (England) Everton)
28	FW	PAR	Jesús Medina (from (United States) New York City)
60	DF	RUS	Daniil Gurchenko (from Strogino Moscow)
61	DF	RUS	Dmitry Kalayda
62	DF	RUS	Denis Konshin (from own academy)
63	FW	RUS	Yaroslav Dol (from own academy)
67	DF	RUS	Ilya Kazakov (from own academy)
68	DF	RUS	Yegor Shevelev
79	DF	RUS	Ruslan Ozdoyev (from Strogino Moscow academy)
93	FW	RUS	Stanislav Lapinsky
97	MF	TUR	Yusuf Yazıcı (on loan from (France) Lille)

Out: Note: Flags indicate national team as defined under FIFA eligibility rules; some limited exceptions apply. Players may hold more than one non-FIFA nationality.

No.	Pos.	Nation	Player
5	DF	RUS	Viktor Vasin (to (Kazakhstan) Kairat)
9	FW	RUS	Fyodor Chalov (on loan to (Switzerland) Basel)
13	DF	RUS	Maksim Yeleyev (on loan to Tekstilshchik Ivanovo, previously on loan to Amkar Perm)
20	MF	RUS	Konstantin Kuchayev (on loan to Rubin Kazan)
25	MF	CRO	Kristijan Bistrović (on loan to (Turkey) Fatih Karagümrük)
27	DF	CIV	Cédric Gogoua (to (Kazakhstan) Turan)
57	FW	RUS	Marat Tlekhugov (to Lokomotiv Moscow)
88	MF	NOR	Emil Bohinen (on loan to (Italy) Salernitana)
89	GK	RUS	Vladimir Brezhnev (to Luki-Energiya Velikiye Luki)
97	FW	RUS	Mikhail Zabotkin (on loan to (Spain) Albacete)
—	MF	RUS	Anton Krachkovsky (to (Kazakhstan) Kairat, previously on loan to Kairat Moscow)
—	MF	RUS	Vitaly Zhironkin (on loan to Kairat Moscow, previously on loan to Volgar Astrakhan)
—	FW	MLI	Lassana N'Diaye (on loan to (Bulgaria) Arda Kardzhali, previously on loan to Tekstilshchik Ivanovo)

=== Dynamo Moscow ===
In: Note: Flags indicate national team as defined under FIFA eligibility rules; some limited exceptions apply. Players may hold more than one non-FIFA nationality.

No.	Pos.	Nation	Player
38	FW	RUS	Aleksandr Chupayov (from Saturn Ramenskoye)
39	MF	RUS	Ibragim Umarov (from own academy)
40	FW	RUS	Fyodor Smolov (from Lokomotiv Moscow)
41	MF	RUS	Yegor Nazarenko (from own academy)
49	MF	RUS	Georgy Sopromadze
59	DF	RUS	Ivan Lepsky (from own academy)
69	FW	RUS	Denis Bokov (from own academy)
83	MF	RUS	Rodion Podguzov (from own academy)

Out: Note: Flags indicate national team as defined under FIFA eligibility rules; some limited exceptions apply. Players may hold more than one non-FIFA nationality.

No.	Pos.	Nation	Player
10	FW	NGA	Sylvester Igboun (to Nizhny Novgorod)
26	DF	RUS	Grigori Morozov (to (Slovenia) Celje)
28	MF	RUS	Yevgeny Mukhin (to Olimp-Dolgoprudny-2)
30	MF	RUS	Anton Terekhov (to Neftekhimik Nizhnekamsk)
35	GK	RUS	Nikita Pavlov
36	GK	RUS	Mikhail Yashin
39	DF	RUS	Robinzon Zvonkov (on loan to Volgar Astrakhan)
44	DF	RUS	Ilya Kalachyov (to Olimp-Dolgoprudny)
59	DF	RUS	Maksim Karayev (to Olimp-Dolgoprudny)
69	MF	RUS	Aleksey Usanov
83	DF	RUS	Bogdan Kizhapkin (to Sochi)
90	MF	RUS	Vladislav Galkin (on loan to (Latvia) RFS)
—	MF	GEO	Luka Gagnidze (contract suspended, at (Poland) Raków Częstochowa, previously on loan to Ural Yekaterinburg)

=== Khimki ===
In: Note: Flags indicate national team as defined under FIFA eligibility rules; some limited exceptions apply. Players may hold more than one non-FIFA nationality.

No.	Pos.	Nation	Player
17	MF	RUS	Pavel Mamayev (from Rostov)
18	DF	RUS	Yuri Zhirkov (free agent, last with Zenit St. Petersburg)
19	FW	RUS	Aleksandr Rudenko (from Spartak Moscow)
20	MF	SRB	Nemanja Glavčić (from (Croatia) Slaven Belupo)
23	DF	BLR	Zakhar Volkov (on loan from (Belarus) BATE Borisov)
24	MF	NGA	Lawrence Nicholas (from Olimp-Dolgoprudny)
26	DF	RUS	Artyom Yuran (from Rotor-2 Volgograd)
31	MF	RUS	Vadim Bagayev
39	DF	RUS	Erik Gubiyev
40	GK	RUS	Gleb Gusev
42	MF	RUS	Tigran Mkrtychev
47	DF	RUS	Roman Petrov
49	DF	RUS	Filip Gililov
56	MF	RUS	Maksim Gavrilov (from Lokomotiv Moscow)
57	DF	RUS	Nikita Pesotsky (from Strogino Moscow academy)
66	DF	RUS	Denis Kalmykov
68	FW	RUS	Nikita Salikov (from Strogino Moscow academy)
70	MF	RUS	Butta Magomedov (from Alania Vladikavkaz)
72	GK	RUS	Dmitry Pivunchikov
73	MF	RUS	Vladislav Romantsev (from Lokomotiv Moscow)
83	FW	RUS	Vladislav Alyapin
88	DF	GEO	Gia Grigalava (free agent)
95	FW	RUS	Valery Aksyonov
96	FW	RUS	Oleg Panchekha

Out: Note: Flags indicate national team as defined under FIFA eligibility rules; some limited exceptions apply. Players may hold more than one non-FIFA nationality.

No.	Pos.	Nation	Player
2	DF	RUS	Maksim Karpov (end of loan from Krylia Sovetov Samara)
3	MF	SWE	Filip Dagerstål (contact suspended, at (Sweden) IFK Norrköping)
5	MF	RUS	Aleksandr Troshechkin (to Akhmat Grozny)
9	FW	SUI	Kemal Ademi (on loan to (Germany) SC Paderborn 07)
9	FW	CMR	Didier Lamkel Zé (end of loan from (Belgium) Antwerp, previously on loan)
18	MF	RUS	Artyom Sokolov (to Krylia Sovetov Samara)
30	DF	BRA	Bruno Viana (end of loan from (Portugal) Braga, previously on loan)
33	DF	SVN	Dušan Stojinović (end of loan from (Slovenia) Celje)
35	GK	RUS	Vitali Sychyov (on loan to Olimp-Dolgoprudny)
55	DF	RUS	Aleksey Kolesnikov (to SKA-Khabarovsk-2)
56	MF	RUS	Dmitry Osipov
72	MF	RUS	Artemy Radushinsky
73	MF	RUS	Dzheffri Lyao
79	GK	RUS	Yegor Malyshev
86	FW	RUS	Timur Galimzyanov
96	FW	RUS	Karim Sagdeyev
—	DF	RUS	Kirill Bolshakov (on loan to Kuban Krasnodar, previously on loan to Olimp-Dolgoprudny)
—	FW	RUS	Kamran Aliyev (to SKA-Khabarovsk, previously on loan)

=== Krasnodar ===
In: Note: Flags indicate national team as defined under FIFA eligibility rules; some limited exceptions apply. Players may hold more than one non-FIFA nationality.

No.	Pos.	Nation	Player
24	DF	RUS	Maksim Maltsev (from own academy)
25	GK	RUS	Mikhail Kuzmin (from own academy)
27	DF	RUS	Daniil Melnikov (from own academy)
33	DF	RUS	Georgy Arutyunyan (from own academy)
46	DF	RUS	Vladimir Yarlykov (from own academy)
60	GK	RUS	Kirill Goltsev (from own academy)
61	MF	NGA	Ifeanyi David Nduka (on loan from (Bulgaria) Botev Plovdiv, registered for Krasnodar-2)
65	MF	RUS	Vitaly Zhokhov (from own academy)
66	GK	RUS	Albert Bitarov (from own academy)
68	MF	RUS	Dmitry Paderin (from own academy)
71	FW	RUS	Kirill Bogdanets (from own academy)
76	FW	RUS	Robert Potinyan (from own academy)
77	MF	RUS	Nikita Getman (from own academy)
83	FW	RUS	Dmitry Kanayev (from own academy)
85	FW	NGA	Jonathan Okoronkwo (on loan from (Bulgaria) Botev Plovdiv)
89	FW	RUS	Nikita Baranov (from own academy)
90	MF	RUS	Vladislav Dys (from own academy)
93	FW	RUS	Igor Mutko (from own academy)
94	MF	RUS	Dmitry Kuchugura (from own academy)
95	DF	RUS	Daniil Spesivtsev (from own academy)
97	DF	RUS	Denis Andreyanov (from own academy)

Out: Note: Flags indicate national team as defined under FIFA eligibility rules; some limited exceptions apply. Players may hold more than one non-FIFA nationality.

No.	Pos.	Nation	Player
3	MF	POL	Grzegorz Krychowiak (contract suspended, at (Greece) AEK Athens)
5	DF	SRB	Uroš Spajić (to (Turkey) Kasımpaşa)
6	DF	ECU	Cristian Ramírez (contract suspended)
7	MF	FRA	Rémy Cabella (to (France) Montpellier)
9	FW	COL	Jhon Córdoba (contract suspended)
10	MF	BRA	Wanderson (on loan to (Brazil) Internacional, previously returned from injury)
12	MF	PAR	Júnior Alonso (on loan to (Brazil) Atlético Mineiro, previously from Atlético Mineiro)
16	MF	SWE	Viktor Claesson (to (Denmark) Copenhagen)
20	FW	NOR	Erik Botheim (contract suspended, previously from (Norway) Bodø/Glimt)
27	DF	RUS	Nikita Furin
31	DF	BRA	Kaio (contract suspended)
34	DF	RUS	Danil Pelikh (to Rotor Volgograd)
52	MF	NED	Tonny Vilhena (on loan to (Spain) Espanyol)
65	DF	RUS	Yevgeni Nazarov (to (Czech Republic) Bohemians 1905)
68	MF	RUS	Sergey Gonzar
71	GK	RUS	Sergei Yeshchenko (on loan to Fakel Voronezh)
85	MF	RUS	Mikhail Strelnik (to Olimp-Dolgoprudny)
89	DF	RUS	Dmitry Stotsky (to Nizhny Novgorod)
94	DF	RUS	Maksim Khramtsov (to Baltika Kaliningrad)
95	FW	RUS	Artyom Shevchenko
97	FW	RUS	Yaroslav Sychyov
—	DF	RUS	Igor Paradin (to Kuban-Holding Pavlovskaya, previously on loan to Mashuk-KMV Pyatigorsk)
—	MF	DEN	Younes Namli (on loan to (Netherlands) Sparta Rotterdam, previously on loan to (United States) Colorado Rapids)

=== Krylia Sovetov Samara ===
In: Note: Flags indicate national team as defined under FIFA eligibility rules; some limited exceptions apply. Players may hold more than one non-FIFA nationality.

No.	Pos.	Nation	Player
14	MF	RUS	Aleksandr Kovalenko (from Chertanovo Moscow)
22	DF	BRA	Fernando Costanza (from (Moldova) Sheriff Tiraspol)
44	DF	CRO	Mateo Barać (on loan from Sochi)
51	MF	RUS	Valery Fomenko (from Vista Gelendzhik)
56	DF	RUS	Artyom Radayev
66	DF	RUS	Yan Gudkov (from Olimp-Dolgoprudny)
70	GK	RUS	Aleksey Bychenko (from own academy)
75	MF	RUS	Nikita Khrisanfov (from Konoplyov football academy)
77	MF	RUS	Artyom Sokolov (from Khimki)
79	MF	RUS	Nikita Andreyev
85	FW	RUS	Ivan Ignatyev (on loan from Rubin Kazan)
88	GK	RUS	Ivan Borisov
89	DF	RUS	Artur Zagorodnikov (from Konoplyov football academy)
95	DF	RUS	Ilya Gaponov (on loan from Spartak Moscow)
98	MF	RUS	Nikita Fadeyev

Out: Note: Flags indicate national team as defined under FIFA eligibility rules; some limited exceptions apply. Players may hold more than one non-FIFA nationality.

No.	Pos.	Nation	Player
2	DF	CRO	Silvije Begić (end of loan from Rubin Kazan)
3	DF	RUS	Nikita Chernov (to Spartak Moscow)
7	FW	RUS	Dmitri Kabutov (to Ufa)
18	DF	ALG	Mehdi Zeffane (to (Turkey) Yeni Malatyaspor)
25	MF	RUS	Danil Prutsev (to Spartak Moscow)
33	FW	RUS	Ivan Sergeyev (to Zenit Saint Petersburg)
35	DF	BLR	Dmitry Prishchepa (on loan to Veles Moscow)
43	FW	RUS	Maksim Aronov
60	FW	RUS	Sergey Knyazkov
67	DF	RUS	Roman Yermakov
73	MF	RUS	Artyom Bulgakov
76	DF	RUS	Marat Aksanov
83	MF	RUS	Karim Aukhadeyev
87	MF	RUS	Klim Salmin
90	GK	RUS	Vladimir Krasilnikov
95	DF	RUS	Anton Kiselyov (to Salyut Belgorod)
—	GK	RUS	Nikita Yavorsky (on loan to Chertanovo Moscow, previously from Chertanovo)
—	DF	RUS	Maksim Karpov (to Metallurg Lipetsk, previously on loan to Khimki)
—	DF	RUS	Aleksei Nikitenkov (on loan to Metallurg Lipetsk, previously from Olimp-Dolgoprudny)
—	MF	RUS	Leonid Gerchikov (on loan to Metallurg Lipetsk, previously from Olimp-Dolgoprudny)
—	MF	RUS	Ilya Gribakin (on loan to Chertanovo Moscow, previously from Chertanovo)
—	MF	RUS	Nikita Pershin (on loan to Chertanovo Moscow, previously from Chertanovo)
—	MF	RUS	Nikita Saltykov (on loan to Zvezda St. Petersburg, previously from Chertanovo Moscow)
—	MF	RUS	Dmitri Velikorodny (on loan to Metallurg Lipetsk, previously from Olimp-Dolgoprudny)
—	FW	KAZ	Abat Aymbetov (to (Kazakhstan) Astana, previously on loan)
—	FW	RUS	Yegor Pankov (on loan to Chertanovo Moscow, previously from Chertanovo)
—	FW	RUS	Pavel Popov (on loan to Chertanovo Moscow, previously from Chertanovo)

=== Lokomotiv Moscow ===
In: Note: Flags indicate national team as defined under FIFA eligibility rules; some limited exceptions apply. Players may hold more than one non-FIFA nationality.

No.	Pos.	Nation	Player
9	FW	CZE	Jan Kuchta (from (Czech Republic) Slavia Prague)
18	DF	UKR	Mark Mampassi (from (Ukraine) Shakhtar Donetsk)
19	FW	FRA	Wilson Isidor (from (France) Monaco)
33	MF	RUS	Mikhail Shchetinin (from own academy)
34	DF	RUS	Kirill Sidorenko (from own academy)
43	MF	RUS	Ivan Dostovalov (from own academy)
61	MF	RUS	Marat Tlekhugov (from CSKA Moscow)
67	GK	RUS	Artyom Yermakov (from own academy)
68	MF	RUS	Anton Gorbunov (from own academy)
76	MF	RUS	Artur Koshman (from own academy)
82	DF	RUS	Aleksey Lysov (from own academy)
85	GK	RUS	Timofey Mitrov (from own academy)
92	MF	RUS	Abdula Bagamayev (from Tyumen academy)
96	DF	RUS	Vladimir Grigoryan (from own academy)
97	MF	RUS	Denis Valter

Out: Note: Flags indicate national team as defined under FIFA eligibility rules; some limited exceptions apply. Players may hold more than one non-FIFA nationality.

No.	Pos.	Nation	Player
3	DF	BRA	Pablo (to (Brazil) Flamengo)
9	FW	RUS	Fyodor Smolov (to Dynamo Moscow)
10	MF	ENG	Tino Anjorin (end of loan from (England) Chelsea)
20	FW	CPV	Zé Luís (to (Saudi Arabia) Al Taawoun)
27	DF	BRA	Murilo (to (Brazil) Palmeiras)
33	DF	RUS	Vladimir Sholokh (on loan to Avangard Kursk)
34	DF	RUS	Maksim Gavrilov (to Khimki)
43	DF	RUS	Kirill Ivashkin (to SKA Rostov-on-Don)
45	DF	RUS	Aleksandr Silyanov (on loan to Rostov)
61	MF	RUS	Vadim Karev (to Kuban Krasnodar)
64	MF	RUS	Maksim Matveyev (to (Czech Republic) Dynamo České Budějovice)
67	MF	RUS	Vladislav Romantsev (to Khimki)
68	FW	RUS	Matvey Bogatov
76	MF	RUS	Daniil Fomin
82	DF	RUS	Ilya Petukhov (to Olimp-Dolgoprudny)
85	DF	RUS	Yevgeny Morozov (on loan to Volgar Astrakhan)
88	FW	BLR	Vitaly Lisakovich (to Rubin Kazan)
96	DF	RUS	Sergey Varatynov (to Strogino Moscow)
97	DF	RUS	Nikita Dronov (to Olimp-Dolgoprudny-2)

=== Nizhny Novgorod ===
In: Note: Flags indicate national team as defined under FIFA eligibility rules; some limited exceptions apply. Players may hold more than one non-FIFA nationality.

No.	Pos.	Nation	Player
2	DF	RUS	Viktor Aleksandrov (on loan from Rubin Kazan)
13	GK	RUS	Nikita Goylo (on loan from Zenit St. Petersburg)
14	MF	RUS	Kirill Kravtsov (on loan from Zenit St. Petersburg)
27	FW	ANG	Felício Milson (from (Portugal) Marítimo)
43	MF	RUS	Ivan Shovitov (from Konoplyov football academy)
50	MF	RUS	Denis Nikonorov
53	GK	RUS	Matvey Frolov
54	DF	RUS	Artyom Samokhvalov
59	DF	RUS	Igor Semyonov (from own academy)
61	FW	RUS	Roman Osin
77	MF	RUS	Pavel Karasyov (from (Belarus) BATE Borisov)
89	DF	RUS	Dmitry Stotsky (from Krasnodar)

Out: Note: Flags indicate national team as defined under FIFA eligibility rules; some limited exceptions apply. Players may hold more than one non-FIFA nationality.

No.	Pos.	Nation	Player
9	FW	RUS	Artyom Galadzhan (to Tom Tomsk)
10	MF	NOR	Lars Olden Larsen (contract suspended, at (Sweden) BK Häcken, previously from (Norway) Mjøndalen)
10	FW	BLR	Aleksandr Shestyuk (on loan to (Latvia) RFS, previously from (Belarus) Dinamo Brest)
11	FW	RUS	Kirill Kosarev (end of loan from Rubin Kazan)
13	MF	CMR	Petrus Boumal (to (Hungary) Újpest)
18	MF	RUS	Pavel Mogilevets
19	FW	ALB	Bekim Balaj (to (Turkey) Boluspor)
33	GK	RUS	Andrei Sinitsyn (to Dynamo Makhachkala)
41	MF	RUS	Aleksandr Sapeta (on loan to Kuban Krasnodar)
44	FW	NGA	Sylvester Igboun (released, previously from Dynamo Moscow)
50	DF	RUS	Artemy Plakidin
53	GK	RUS	Matvey Tyurin (to Volna Nizhny Novgorod Oblast)
54	DF	RUS	Mikhail Golov
59	MF	RUS	Danil Vinokurov

=== Rostov ===
In: Note: Flags indicate national team as defined under FIFA eligibility rules; some limited exceptions apply. Players may hold more than one non-FIFA nationality.

No.	Pos.	Nation	Player
38	MF	BLR	Aleksandr Selyava (from (Belarus) Dinamo Minsk)
45	DF	RUS	Aleksandr Silyanov (on loan from Lokomotiv Moscow)
53	FW	RUS	Kirill Moiseyev (from own academy)
54	DF	RUS	Daniil Yeryomin
56	MF	RUS	Yaroslav Kuzmin
58	MF	RUS	Daniil Shantaly (from own academy)
63	MF	RUS	Abdullo Dzhebov (from UOR #5 Yegoryevsk)
69	FW	RUS	Yegor Golenkov (from (Czech Republic) Sigma Olomouc)
77	FW	RUS	Stepan Melnikov (from Spartak Moscow)
78	GK	RUS	Mikhail Tsulaya (from own academy)
79	GK	RUS	Aleksey Ivanov (from own academy)
82	DF	RUS	Magomed Temishev (from Dynamo Makhachkala academy)
83	FW	RUS	Maksim Stavtsev (from own academy)
94	MF	RUS	Marat Kovalkov (from own academy)

Out: Note: Flags indicate national team as defined under FIFA eligibility rules; some limited exceptions apply. Players may hold more than one non-FIFA nationality.

No.	Pos.	Nation	Player
5	DF	BIH	Dennis Hadžikadunić (on loan to (Sweden) Malmö)
8	MF	SWE	Armin Gigović (contract suspended, at (Sweden) Helsingborg)
10	MF	RUS	Pavel Mamayev (to Khimki)
11	FW	SWE	Pontus Almqvist (contract suspended, at (Netherlands) Utrecht)
14	MF	NOR	Magnus Nordengen Knudsen (on loan to (Norway) Lillestrøm, previously from Lillestrøm)
18	MF	JPN	Kento Hashimoto (contract suspended, at (Japan) Vissel Kobe)
24	DF	RUS	Konstantin Kovalyov (on loan to Baltika Kaliningrad)
64	DF	RUS	David Semenchuk
65	DF	RUS	Timofey Kalistratov (on loan to Dynamo St. Petersburg)
74	FW	RUS	Narek Manukyan (end of loan from Kaluga)
77	GK	RUS	Maksim Rudakov (on loan to (Finland) Honka)
85	MF	RUS	Dmitry Serebryakov
—	DF	BLR	Aleksandr Pavlovets (on loan to (Poland) Warta Poznań, previously on loan to (Ukraine) Kolos Kovalivka)
—	DF	RUS	Aleksandr Smirnov (on loan to KAMAZ Naberezhnye Chelny, previously on loan to SKA-Khabarovsk)
—	DF	RUS	Danila Vedernikov (on loan to Kuban Krasnodar, previously on loan to Volgar Astrakhan)
—	MF	RUS	Nikita Kolotiyevsky (on loan to Torpedo Miass, previously on loan to Olimp-Dolgoprudny-2)
—	FW	MKD	David Toshevski (on loan to (Slovakia) Zemplín Michalovce, previously on loan to (Poland) Górnik Zabrze)

=== Rubin Kazan ===
In: Note: Flags indicate national team as defined under FIFA eligibility rules; some limited exceptions apply. Players may hold more than one non-FIFA nationality.

No.	Pos.	Nation	Player
2	DF	RUS	Yegor Teslenko (from KAMAZ Naberezhnye Chelny)
8	MF	RUS	Aleksandr Lomovitsky (from Spartak Moscow)
13	FW	RUS	Kirill Klimov (end of loan to Kuban Krasnodar)
18	MF	RUS	Marat Apshatsev (from Tom Tomsk)
32	GK	RUS	Amir Khayrulin (from own academy)
44	FW	BLR	Vitaly Lisakovich (from Lokomotiv Moscow)
48	FW	RUS	Roman Chibanov (from own academy)
50	DF	RUS	Emil Kamilov (from own academy)
64	MF	RUS	Denis Makarov (from own academy)
82	MF	RUS	Mikhail Matveyev (from own academy)
85	FW	RUS	Daniil Kuznetsov (from Zenit St. Petersburg)
92	FW	RUS	Maksim Nikiforov (from own academy)
98	MF	RUS	Konstantin Kuchayev (on loan from CSKA Moscow)

Out: Note: Flags indicate national team as defined under FIFA eligibility rules; some limited exceptions apply. Players may hold more than one non-FIFA nationality.

No.	Pos.	Nation	Player
4	DF	CRO	Silvije Begić (contract suspended, previously returned from loan to Krylia Sovetov Samara)
5	DF	CRO	Filip Uremović (contract suspended, at (England) Sheffield United)
6	MF	KOR	Hwang In-beom (contract suspended, at (South Korea) Seoul)
8	MF	RUS	Oleg Shatov (career pause, then to Ural Yekaterinburg)
9	FW	SRB	Đorđe Despotović (to Arsenal Tula)
11	FW	DEN	Anders Dreyer (contract suspended, at (Denmark) Midtjylland)
19	FW	RUS	Ivan Ignatyev (on loan to Krylia Sovetov Samara)
21	MF	GEO	Khvicha Kvaratskhelia (contract suspended, at (Georgia (country)) Dinamo Batumi)
42	MF	RUS	Aleksey Zakharov (on loan to Volna Nizhny Novgorod Oblast)
45	FW	RUS	Grisha Melikyan
57	MF	RUS	Mishel Pukhayev (to Dynamo Stavropol)
66	GK	RUS	Nikita Yanovich (on loan to Dynamo Stavropol)
74	DF	RUS	Kirill Parshin
75	GK	RUS	Ivan Konovalov (to (Scotland) Livingston)
76	MF	RUS	Ilkham Yarullin
79	FW	RUS	Abu-Muslim Khamkhoyev
82	DF	RUS	Viktor Aleksandrov (on loan to Nizhny Novgorod)
93	GK	RUS	Aleksei Gorodovoy (to Fakel Voronezh)
99	FW	MNE	Sead Hakšabanović (contract suspended, at (Sweden) Djurgården)
—	DF	RUS	Danil Stepanov (to Arsenal Tula, previously on loan)
—	MF	JPN	Mitsuki Saito (end of loan from (Japan) Shonan Bellmare)
—	FW	RUS	Kirill Kosarev (on loan to Volgar Astrakhan, previously on loan to Nizhny Novgorod)

=== Sochi ===
In: Note: Flags indicate national team as defined under FIFA eligibility rules; some limited exceptions apply. Players may hold more than one non-FIFA nationality.

No.	Pos.	Nation	Player
3	DF	SVN	Vanja Drkušić (from (Slovenia) Bravo)
9	FW	RUS	Georgi Melkadze (from Spartak Moscow)
17	DF	RUS	Artyom Makarchuk (from Baltika Kaliningrad)
63	DF	RUS	Bogdan Kizhapkin (from Dynamo Moscow)

Out: Note: Flags indicate national team as defined under FIFA eligibility rules; some limited exceptions apply. Players may hold more than one non-FIFA nationality.

No.	Pos.	Nation	Player
4	DF	CRO	Mateo Barać (on loan to Krylia Sovetov Samara)
9	FW	CRO	Marko Dugandžić (to (Romania) CFR Cluj)
10	FW	RUS	Maksim Barsov (on loan to Baltika Kaliningrad)
17	MF	RUS	Maksim Kolmakov (on loan to (Belarus) Dinamo Brest)
24	DF	ARG	Emanuel Mammana (end of loan from Zenit St. Petersburg)
41	MF	RUS	Yegor Saygushev (to Arsenal Tula)
53	MF	RUS	Daniil Pavlov (on loan to (Belarus) Dinamo Brest)
47	MF	RUS	Artyom Terentyev (to Znamya Truda Orekhovo-Zuyevo)
56	DF	RUS	Dmitry Kumsarov (to Krasava)
63	DF	RUS	Vladimir Prozorov (to Arsenal-2 Tula)
79	MF	RUS	Anzor Amiraliyev (to Krasava)
90	DF	RUS	Pavel Shakuro (to Yenisey Krasnoyarsk)
—	MF	RUS	Yegor Prutsev (on loan to Neftekhimik Nizhnekamsk, previously on loan to Tekstilshchik Ivanovo)
—	MF	ARM	Erik Vardanyan (to (Armenia) Urartu, previously on loan to (Armenia) Pyunik)

=== Spartak Moscow ===
In: Note: Flags indicate national team as defined under FIFA eligibility rules; some limited exceptions apply. Players may hold more than one non-FIFA nationality.

No.	Pos.	Nation	Player
2	DF	FRA	Samuel Gigot (on loan from (France) Marseille, previously to Marseille)
5	DF	RUS	Leon Klassen (from (Austria) WSG Tirol)
16	GK	RUS	Ilya Tikhomirov (from own academy)
17	MF	LUX	Christopher Martins (on loan from (Switzerland) Young Boys)
19	FW	JAM	Shamar Nicholson (from (Belgium) Charleroi)
23	DF	RUS	Nikita Chernov (from Krylia Sovetov Samara)
25	MF	RUS	Danil Prutsev (from Krylia Sovetov Samara)
26	MF	RUS	Daniil Khlusevich (from Arsenal Tula)
44	DF	RUS	Danil Trukhanov (from Yenisey-2 Krasnoyarsk)
45	FW	RUS	Ali Kartoyev (from Lokomotiv Moscow academy)
46	MF	RUS	Artur Tumanyan
71	MF	RUS	Nikita Postnikov (from own academy)
87	FW	RUS	Artur Maksimchuk (from Saturn Ramenskoye)
88	GK	RUS	Ilya Svinov (from Fakel Voronezh)

Out: Note: Flags indicate national team as defined under FIFA eligibility rules; some limited exceptions apply. Players may hold more than one non-FIFA nationality.

No.	Pos.	Nation	Player
4	MF	NED	Jorrit Hendrix (on loan to (Netherlands) Feyenoord)
6	DF	BRA	Ayrton Lucas (on loan to (Brazil) Flamengo)
9	FW	ARG	Ezequiel Ponce (on loan to (Spain) Elche)
11	FW	SWE	Jordan Larsson (contract suspended, to (Sweden) AIK)
16	GK	RUS	Artyom Poplevchenkov (to Kuban Krasnodar)
17	MF	RUS	Aleksandr Lomovitsky (to Rubin Kazan)
21	FW	RUS	Georgi Melkadze (to Sochi)
32	GK	RUS	Artyom Rebrov (retired)
38	DF	RUS	Andrey Yeshchenko (retired)
56	DF	RUS	Ilya Gaponov (on loan to Krylia Sovetov Samara)
71	FW	RUS	Stepan Melnikov (to Rostov)
79	FW	RUS	Aleksandr Rudenko (to Khimki)
89	FW	RUS	Ilya Golyatov (to Volna Nizhny Novgorod Oblast)
87	FW	RUS	Svyatoslav Kozhedub (to Akron Tolyatti)
—	MF	RUS	Nikita Morgunov (on loan to Lada-Tolyatti, previously on loan to Tyumen)

=== Ufa ===
In: Note: Flags indicate national team as defined under FIFA eligibility rules; some limited exceptions apply. Players may hold more than one non-FIFA nationality.

No.	Pos.	Nation	Player
7	MF	RUS	Dmitri Kabutov (from Krylia Sovetov Samara)
8	MF	RUS	Danila Yemelyanov (end of loan to Neftekhimik Nizhnekamsk)
32	GK	BLR	Anton Chichkan (from (Belarus) BATE Borisov)
43	MF	RUS	Fyodor Solovey (from (France) ACBB)
54	DF	RUS	Pavel Rakitin
66	GK	RUS	Bulat Bakirov (from own academy)
99	FW	COL	Dilan Ortiz (on loan from (Serbia) Proleter Novi Sad)

Out: Note: Flags indicate national team as defined under FIFA eligibility rules; some limited exceptions apply. Players may hold more than one non-FIFA nationality.

No.	Pos.	Nation	Player
1	GK	RUS	Aleksey Kuznetsov (on loan to Veles Moscow)
7	MF	RUS	Azer Aliyev (to (Azerbaijan) Neftçi)
12	DF	BEL	Boli Bolingoli-Mbombo (end of loan from (Scotland) Celtic, previously on loan)
20	MF	POR	Tiago Rodrigues (released, previously from (Saudi Arabia) Al-Hazem)
32	DF	AUT	Moritz Bauer (to (Switzerland) Servette)
—	DF	RUS	Oleg Dzantiyev (on loan to SKA Rostov-on-Don)
—	DF	GEO	Jemal Tabidze (released, previously not registered due to injury)

=== Ural Yekaterinburg ===
In: Note: Flags indicate national team as defined under FIFA eligibility rules; some limited exceptions apply. Players may hold more than one non-FIFA nationality.

No.	Pos.	Nation	Player
7	MF	RUS	Aleksandr Yushin (from Neftekhimik Nizhnekamsk)
8	DF	RUS	Roman Yemelyanov (return from injury)
27	MF	RUS	Oleg Shatov (from Rubin Kazan)
38	GK	RUS	Nikita Zyryanov (from Konoplyov football academy)
52	DF	RUS	Artyom Ilyin
58	DF	RUS	Aleksey Polev
61	MF	RUS	Vladislav Barabash
66	DF	SRB	Dominik Dinga (end of loan to (Belarus) Dinamo Minsk)
78	MF	RUS	Kirill Boyarskikh (from Rostov academy)
82	MF	RUS	Andrey Reznik
86	GK	RUS	Ivan Kuznetsov
89	MF	RUS	Pavel Mikhaylov
92	DF	RUS	Damir Maksimov
95	MF	RUS	Chingiz Magomadov (end of loan to KAMAZ Naberezhnye Chelny)
97	FW	RUS	Ilya Ishkov

Out: Note: Flags indicate national team as defined under FIFA eligibility rules; some limited exceptions apply. Players may hold more than one non-FIFA nationality.

No.	Pos.	Nation	Player
4	DF	RUS	Vladimir Rykov (to Rodina Moscow)
15	DF	UKR	Denys Kulakov (contract suspended)
17	FW	KOS	Ylldren Ibrahimaj (to (Norway) Lillestrøm)
17	MF	GEO	Luka Tsulukidze (contract suspended, previously from (Georgia (country)) Saburtalo Tbilisi)
18	MF	SRB	Branko Jovičić (to (Austria) LASK)
20	FW	RUS	Andrei Panyukov (on loan to (Kazakhstan) Kyzylzhar)
31	GK	UKR	Yaroslav Hodzyur
34	MF	GEO	Luka Gagnidze (end of loan from Dynamo Moscow)
45	DF	RUS	Matvey Anikin
52	MF	RUS	Maksim Podluzhny
55	FW	RUS	Artyom Maksimenko (on loan to Baltika Kaliningrad)
58	DF	RUS	Ilya Tkachenko
82	MF	RUS	Denis Melyokhin
89	MF	RUS	Kirill Gerasimov
95	DF	RUS	Arsen Adamov (to Zenit St. Petersburg)
96	FW	RUS	Muslim Gamidov (joined in February, released in April)
—	GK	RUS	Vladislav Poletayev (on loan to Tom Tomsk, previously on loan to Orenburg)

=== Zenit Saint Petersburg ===
In: Note: Flags indicate national team as defined under FIFA eligibility rules; some limited exceptions apply. Players may hold more than one non-FIFA nationality.

No.	Pos.	Nation	Player
9	FW	BRA	Yuri Alberto (from (Brazil) Internacional)
23	DF	RUS	Arsen Adamov (from Ural Yekaterinburg)
28	DF	KAZ	Nuraly Alip (on loan from (Kazakhstan) Kairat)
33	FW	RUS	Ivan Sergeyev (from Krylia Sovetov Samara)
45	MF	RUS	Dmitry Sergeyev (end of loan to Baltika Kaliningrad)
46	DF	BLR	Ilya Moskalenchik (from (Belarus) Rukh Brest)
67	FW	RUS	Nikita Luzan (from own academy)
85	DF	RUS	Ivan Shilyonok (from own academy)
78	FW	RUS	Mikhail Pogorelov (from Olimp-Dolgoprudny)

Out: Note: Flags indicate national team as defined under FIFA eligibility rules; some limited exceptions apply. Players may hold more than one non-FIFA nationality.

No.	Pos.	Nation	Player
7	FW	IRN	Sardar Azmoun (to (Germany) Bayer Leverkusen)
32	FW	RUS	Pavel Dolgov (to Metallurg Lipetsk)
44	DF	UKR	Yaroslav Rakitskyi
46	FW	RUS	Nikita Simdyankin (to (Georgia (country)) Samgurali Tsqaltubo)
64	MF	RUS	Kirill Kravtsov (on loan to Nizhny Novgorod)
67	DF	RUS	Artyom Malenkikh
85	FW	RUS	Daniil Kuznetsov (to Rubin Kazan)
87	DF	RUS	Dmitry Vasilyev (on loan to Orenburg)
94	DF	RUS	Danila Khotulyov (on loan to Orenburg)
—	GK	RUS	Nikita Goylo (on loan to Nizhny Novgorod, previously on loan to Akron Tolyatti)
—	DF	ARG	Emanuel Mammana (to (Argentina) River Plate, previously on loan to Sochi)
