= Maksim Ignatyev =

Russian footballer (born 2000)

Personal information
- Full name: Maksim Alekseyevich Ignatyev
- Date of birth: 30 January 2000 (age 26)
- Place of birth: Moscow, Russia
- Height: 1.75 m (5 ft 9 in)
- Position: Left-back

Team information
- Current team: Rubin Kazan
- Number: 18

Youth career
- SSh Odintsovo

Senior career*
Years	Team	Apps	(Gls)
2017–2018	SSh Vybor-Odintsovo (amateur)		
2019	Krasnoznamensk (amateur)		
2020–2021	Olimp-Dolgoprudny-2 (amateur)		
2021–2022	Olimp-Dolgoprudny-2	17	(1)
2022	Krasava	10	(0)
2022–2023	Kuban-Holding	23	(0)
2023–2024	Amkar Perm	13	(0)
2024–2026	Spartak Kostroma	82	(4)
2026–	Rubin Kazan	5	(0)
- * Club domestic league appearances and goals as of 7 September 2026

Maksim Alekseyevich Ignatyev (Russian: Максим Алексеевич Игнатьев; born 30 January 2000) is a Russian football player who plays as a left-back for Rubin Kazan.

== Career ==
Ignatyev spent the first 10 seasons of his senior career in the third and fourth tier of the Russian football, before advancing to the Russian First League with Spartak Kostroma for the 2025–26 season.

On 1 July 2026, Ignatyev signed a three-year contract with Russian Premier League club Rubin Kazan.

He made his Russian Premier League debut for Rubin on 1 August 2026 in a game against Akron Tolyatti.

== Career statistics ==
As of 7 September 2026

Club	Season	League			Cup		Total	
Club	Season	Division	Apps	Goals	Apps	Goals	Apps	Goals
Olimp-Dolgoprudny-2	2021–22	Russian Second League	17	1	—		17	1
Krasava	2021–22	Russian Second League	10	0	—		10	0
Kuban-Holding	2022–23	Russian Second League	23	0	2	0	25	0
Amkar Perm	2023–24	Russian Second League A	13	0	3	0	16	0
Spartak Kostroma	2023–24	Russian Second League A	16	2	—		16	2
Spartak Kostroma	2024–25	Russian Second League A	33	1	3	0	36	1
Spartak Kostroma	2025–26	Russian First League	33	1	1	0	34	1
Spartak Kostroma	Total		82	4	4	0	86	4
Rubin Kazan	2026–27	Russian Premier League	5	0	0	0	5	0
Career total			150	5	9	0	159	5
