= Vladislav Korobkin =

Russian footballer

Personal information
- Full name: Vladislav Yevgenyevich Korobkin
- Date of birth: 21 June 2000 (age 26)
- Height: 1.74 m (5 ft 9 in)
- Position: Midfielder

Senior career*
Years	Team	Apps	(Gls)
2019–2020	FC Fakel Voronezh	10	(0)
2020	FC Fakel-M Voronezh	10	(0)
2021	FC Krasava Odintsovo	9	(0)
- * Club domestic league appearances and goals

Vladislav Yevgenyevich Korobkin (Russian: Владислав Евгеньевич Коробкин; born 21 June 2000) is a Russian former football player.

== Club career ==
He made his debut in the Russian Football National League for FC Fakel Voronezh on 20 July 2019 in a game against FC Chertanovo Moscow.
