= Vladimir Vasin (footballer) =

Russian footballer

Personal information
- Full name: Vladimir Valeryevich Vasin
- Date of birth: 19 January 1983 (age 43)
- Height: 1.72 m (5 ft 7 1/2 in)
- Position: Midfielder

Youth career
- FC Spartak Moscow

Senior career*
Years	Team	Apps	(Gls)
2001	FC Spartak Moscow	0	(0)
2002–2003	FC Torpedo-Metallurg Moscow	1	(0)
2003	FC Titan Moscow	12	(0)
2004	FSK Dolgoprudny (amateur)		
2005–2007	FC Boyevoye Bratstvo Krasnoarmeysk		
2007–2008	FC Dolgiye Prudy Dolgoprudny (amateur)		
2009	FC Prialit Reutov		
- * Club domestic league appearances and goals

Vladimir Valeryevich Vasin (Russian: Владимир Валерьевич Васин; born 19 January 1983 in Moscow) is a former Russian football player.
