= Anatoli Nemchenko =

Russian footballer

Personal information
- Full name: Anatoli Igorevich Nemchenko
- Date of birth: 22 August 2000 (age 26)
- Place of birth: Kislovodsk, Russia
- Height: 1.70 m (5 ft 7 in)
- Position: Midfielder

Team information
- Current team: FC Spartak Kostroma
- Number: 22

Senior career*
Years	Team	Apps	(Gls)
2017–2018	FC Kuban-2 Krasnodar	5	(0)
2018	FC Urozhay Krasnodar	0	(0)
2019	FC Kuban-Holding Pavlovskaya (amateur)		
2019–2023	PFC Sochi	2	(0)
2021	→ FC Olimp-Dolgoprudny (loan)	9	(0)
2021–2022	→ FC Olimp-Dolgoprudny-2 (loan)	23	(0)
2022–2023	→ FC Kosmos Dolgoprudny (loan)	33	(6)
2023–2024	FC Yenisey Krasnoyarsk	11	(0)
2024–	FC Spartak Kostroma	42	(4)
- * Club domestic league appearances and goals as of 16 May 2026

Anatoli Igorevich Nemchenko (Russian: Анатолий Игоревич Немченко; born 22 August 2000) is a Russian football player who plays for FC Spartak Kostroma.

== Club career ==
He made his debut in the Russian Premier League for PFC Sochi on 9 August 2020 in a game against FC Spartak Moscow, he substituted Nikita Burmistrov in the 65th minute.

On 22 January 2021, he joined FC Olimp-Dolgoprudny on loan until the end of the 2020–21 season with an extension option.
