= Matvey Ivakhnov =

Russian footballer

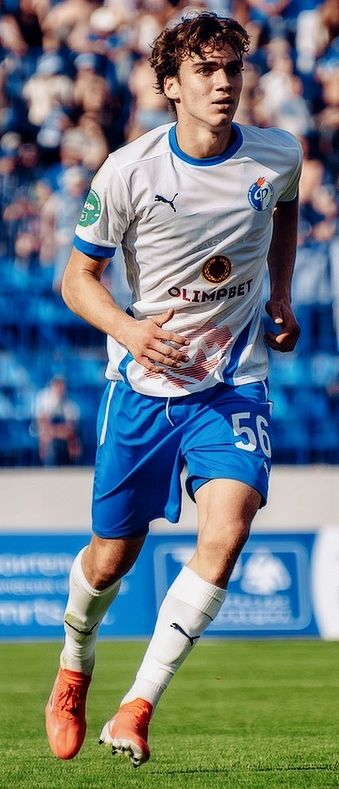
- Ivakhnov with Fakel Voronezh in 2022

Personal information
- Full name: Matvey Andreyevich Ivakhnov
- Date of birth: 21 July 2003 (age 23)
- Place of birth: Volzhsky, Russia
- Height: 1.88 m (6 ft 2 in)
- Position: Forward

Youth career
- –2015: Dynamo Moscow
- 2015–2019: Lokomotiv Moscow
- 2019–2021: Dynamo Moscow

Senior career*
Years	Team	Apps	(Gls)
2021–2022	Super Nova	4	(1)
2022	Krasava	11	(1)
2022–2025	Fakel Voronezh	12	(1)
2023–2024	→ Sokol Saratov (loan)	9	(0)
2024–2025	→ Tekstilshchik Ivanovo (loan)	32	(4)
2025–2026	Murom	10	(2)
2026	Mashuk-KMV	1	(0)

International career^{‡}
2021	Russia U18	2	(0)
- * Club domestic league appearances and goals as of 13 June 2026 ‡ National team caps and goals as of 24 June 2021

Matvey Andreyevich Ivakhnov (Russian: Матвей Андреевич Ивахнов; born 21 July 2003) is a Russian football player who plays as a centre-forward or left winger.

== Club career ==
He made his debut in the Russian Premier League for Fakel Voronezh on 24 July 2022 in a game against Akhmat Grozny, coming on as a substitute for Khyzyr Appayev on the 79th minute. Ivakhnov scored his first goal in the top division on 18 March 2023 in a 3–0 home win against Sochi.

On 20 December 2023, Ivakhnov moved on loan to Sokol Saratov in the Russian First League until the end of the season.

For the 2024–25 season, Ivakhnov was loaned to Tekstilshchik Ivanovo.

== Career statistics ==
As of 27 November 2022

Club	Season	League			Cup		Continental		Total	
Club	Season	Division	Apps	Goals	Apps	Goals	Apps	Goals	Apps	Goals
Super Nova	2021	1. līga	4	1	–		–		4	1
Krasava	2021–22	Second League	11	1	–		–		11	1
Fakel Voronezh	2022–23	RPL	7	0	6	0	–		13	0
Career total			22	2	6	0	0	0	28	2
