= Dmitry Begun =

Russian footballer (born 2003)

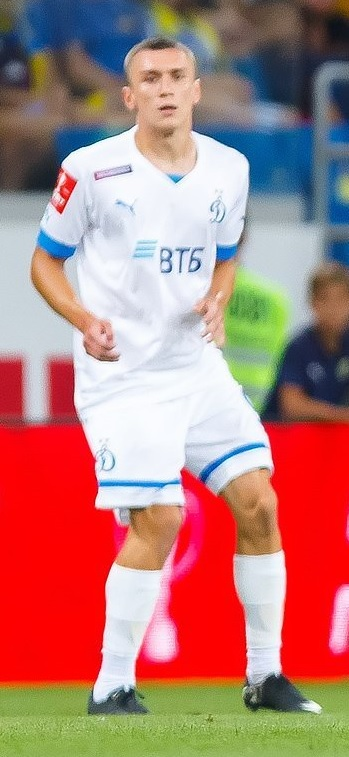
- Begun with Dynamo Moscow in 2022

Personal information
- Full name: Dmitry Aleksandrovich Begun
- Date of birth: 23 April 2003 (age 23)
- Place of birth: Vladivostok, Russia
- Height: 1.70 m (5 ft 7 in)
- Position: Left-back

Team information
- Current team: Baltika Kaliningrad
- Number: 66

Youth career
- –2020: Luch Vladivostok
- 2020–2021: CSKA Moscow
- 2021–2022: Dynamo Moscow

Senior career*
Years	Team	Apps	(Gls)
2021–2023	Dynamo-2 Moscow	34	(0)
2022–2023	Dynamo Moscow	0	(0)
2023–2024	SKA-Khabarovsk	24	(0)
2024–	Baltika Kaliningrad	4	(0)
2024–	→ Baltika-2 Kaliningrad	11	(0)
2025	→ Sokol Saratov (loan)	10	(0)
2025–2026	→ Tyumen (loan)	5	(1)
- * Club domestic league appearances and goals as of 1 November 2026

Dmitry Aleksandrovich Begun (Russian: Дмитрий Александрович Бегун; born 23 April 2003) is a Russian footballer who plays as a left-back for Baltika Kaliningrad.

== Career ==
Begun made his debut for Dynamo Moscow on 31 August 2022 in a Russian Cup game against Rostov.

== Career statistics ==
As of 1 November 2026

Club	Season	League			Cup		Total	
Club	Season	Division	Apps	Goals	Apps	Goals	Apps	Goals
Dynamo-2 Moscow	2021–22	Russian Second League	9	0	–		9	0
Dynamo-2 Moscow	2022–23	Russian Second League	25	0	–		25	0
Dynamo-2 Moscow	Total		34	0	0	0	34	0
Dynamo Moscow	2022–23	Russian Premier League	0	0	1	0	1	0
SKA-Khabarovsk	2023–24	Russian First League	24	0	2	0	26	0
Baltika-2 Kaliningrad	2024	Russian Second League B	6	0	–		6	0
Baltika-2 Kaliningrad	2025	Russian Second League B	2	0	–		2	0
Baltika-2 Kaliningrad	2026	Russian Second League B	3	0	–		3	0
Baltika-2 Kaliningrad	Total		11	0	0	0	11	0
Baltika Kaliningrad	2024–25	Russian First League	4	0	3	0	7	0
Sokol Saratov (loan)	2024–25	Russian First League	10	0	0	0	10	0
Tyumen (loan)	2025–26	Russian Second League A	5	1	1	0	6	1
Career total			88	1	7	0	95	1
