= Dmitry Malykhin =

Russian footballer (born 2000)

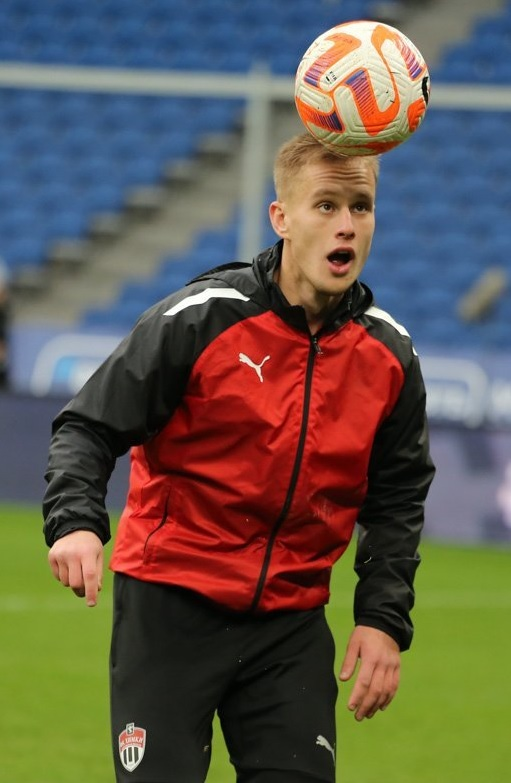
- Malykhin with Khimki in 2022

Personal information
- Full name: Dmitry Olegovich Malykhin
- Date of birth: 13 November 2000 (age 25)
- Height: 1.81 m (5 ft 11 in)
- Position: Midfielder

Team information
- Current team: Salyut Belgorod
- Number: 37

Youth career
- –2018: UOR #5 Yegoryevsk
- 2020–2021: Khimki

Senior career*
Years	Team	Apps	(Gls)
2019–2021	Khimki-M	24	(0)
2021–2022	Volga Ulyanovsk	8	(0)
2022–2023	Khimki-M	40	(9)
2022–2023	Khimki	0	(0)
2023	Shinnik Yaroslavl	8	(0)
2024	Avangard Kursk	30	(3)
2026–	Salyut Belgorod	4	(0)
- * Club domestic league appearances and goals as of 31 October 2026

Dmitry Olegovich Malykhin (Russian: Дмитрий Олегович Малыхин; born 13 November 2000) is a Russian footballer who plays as a midfielder for Salyut Belgorod.

== Career ==
Malykhin made his debut for Khimki on 28 May 2022 in the return leg of the 2021–22 Russian Premier League relegation play-offs against SKA-Khabarovsk. On 13 September 2022, he appeared for Khimki in a Russian Cup game against Pari NN.

== Personal life ==
On 18 February 2025, Malykhin was convicted of inflicting serious injuries on a 46-year-old man in a street fight that happened on 22 May 2024 and sentenced to two years of imprisonment. According to Malykhin, he started the fight after the man insulted Malykhin's girlfriend and refused to apologize. Malykhin pled guilty to the charges. He was released in early 2026.

== Career statistics ==
As of 27 November 2022

Appearances and goals by club, season and competition
Club	Season	League			Cup		Continental		Other		Total	
Club	Season	Division	Apps	Goals	Apps	Goals	Apps	Goals	Apps	Goals	Apps	Goals
Khimki-M	2019–20	Russian Second League	7	0	–		–		–		7	0
Khimki-M	2020–21	Russian Second League	17	0	–		–		–		17	0
Khimki-M	2021–22	Russian Second League	16	3	–		–		–		16	3
Volga Ulyanovsk	2021–22	Russian Second League	8	0	–		–		–		8	0
Khimki	2021–22	Russian Premier League	0	0	0	0	–		1 (Note: Appearance in the relegation play-offs)	0	1	0
Khimki	2022–23	Russian Premier League	0	0	3	0	–		–		3	0
Khimki	Total		0	0	3	0	0	0	1	0	4	0
Khimki-M	2022–23	Russian Second League	15	2	–		–		–		15	2
Career total			63	5	3	0	0	0	1	0	67	5
