= Yevgeny Savin =

Russian footballer and commentator

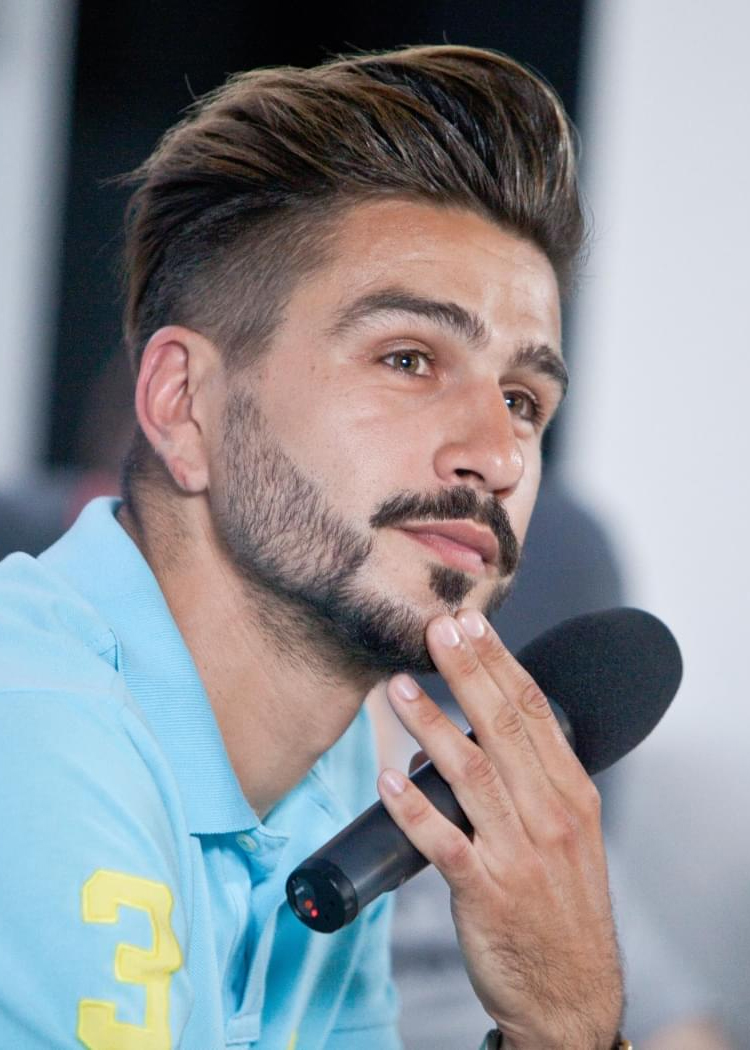
- Savin in 2017

Personal information
- Full name: Yevgeny Leonidovich Savin
- Date of birth: 19 April 1984 (age 42)
- Place of birth: Belozersk, Russian SFSR
- Height: 1.87 m (6 ft 2 in)
- Position: Forward

Youth career
- Irtysh Tobolsk
- 1996–1999: Rotor Volgograd

Senior career*
Years	Team	Apps	(Gls)
2000–2001	Rotor Volgograd	0	(0)
2000	→ Rotor-2 Volgograd	5	(0)
2002	Ryazan-Agrokomplekt	35	(0)
2003	Lokomotiv Moscow	0	(0)
2004	Tom Tomsk	27	(4)
2005	Anzhi Makhachkala	24	(3)
2005	Khimki	9	(3)
2006–2007	Amkar Perm	46	(9)
2008–2011	Krylia Sovetov Samara	96	(19)
2011	Tom Tomsk	10	(0)
2012–2013	Ural Yekaterinburg	10	(1)
2013	Arsenal Tula	33	(20)
2014	Luch-Energiya Vladivostok	5	(0)
2014–2015	Tyumen	12	(3)

International career
2006	Russia U21	6	(3)

Managerial career
- 2021–2022: Krasava (president)
- 2022–: Krasava Ypsona (president)
- * Club domestic league appearances and goals

Yevgeny Leonidovich Savin (Russian: Евгений Леонидович Савин; born 19 April 1984) is a Russian former footballer who is currently a YouTube football blogger and current president of Cypriot football club Krasava Ypsona. After retiring as a football player, he became a football commentator and a TV presenter.

== Career ==
In 2006, he started his career in Russian minor leagues, with his debut in the Russian Premier League with Amkar Perm. He also played for the Russia national under-21 football team and the Olympic national team, but he never qualified for the football tournament of 2008 Olympic Games.

In late 2015, he started working as presenter and commentator for Match TV.

In the start of 2018, he became a YouTuber, with his channel called Krasava.

== Football club president ==
In 2020, he founded a new football team which was licensed for the 2021–22 season of the Russian third-tier FNL 2 as Krasava. They disbanded after one season. He then bought Cypriot Second Division team Ypsonas FC and changed their name to Krasava ENY Ypsonas FC, also changing their club badge.
