= Ilya Kalachyov =

Russian footballer

Personal information
- Full name: Ilya Andreyevich Kalachyov
- Date of birth: 18 January 2000 (age 26)
- Place of birth: Samara, Russia
- Height: 1.85 m (6 ft 1 in)
- Position: Defender

Team information
- Current team: Sokol Saratov
- Number: 4

Youth career
- 2017–2020: Dynamo Moscow

Senior career*
Years	Team	Apps	(Gls)
2020–2022	Dynamo-2 Moscow	6	(0)
2020–2021	→ Tom Tomsk (loan)	8	(0)
2021	→ Neftekhimik Nizhnekamsk (loan)	9	(0)
2022	Olimp-Dolgoprudny	9	(0)
2022–2024	Isloch Minsk Raion	52	(2)
2024	Baltika Kaliningrad	0	(0)
2024	Baltika-BFU Kaliningrad	3	(0)
2025	Dinamo Minsk	7	(0)
2025	Spartak Kostroma	4	(0)
2026	Slavia Mozyr	7	(0)
2026–	Sokol Saratov	18	(1)

International career^{‡}
2015	Russia U-16	1	(0)
2017–2018	Russia U-18	3	(0)
- * Club domestic league appearances and goals as of 15 November 2026 ‡ National team caps and goals as of 8 May 2018

Ilya Andreyevich Kalachyov (Russian: Илья Андреевич Калачёв; born 18 January 2000) is a Russian football player who plays for Sokol Saratov.

== Club career ==
He made his debut in the Russian Football National League for Tom Tomsk on 4 October 2020 in a game against Torpedo Moscow.
