= Vladimir Marukhin =

Russian footballer

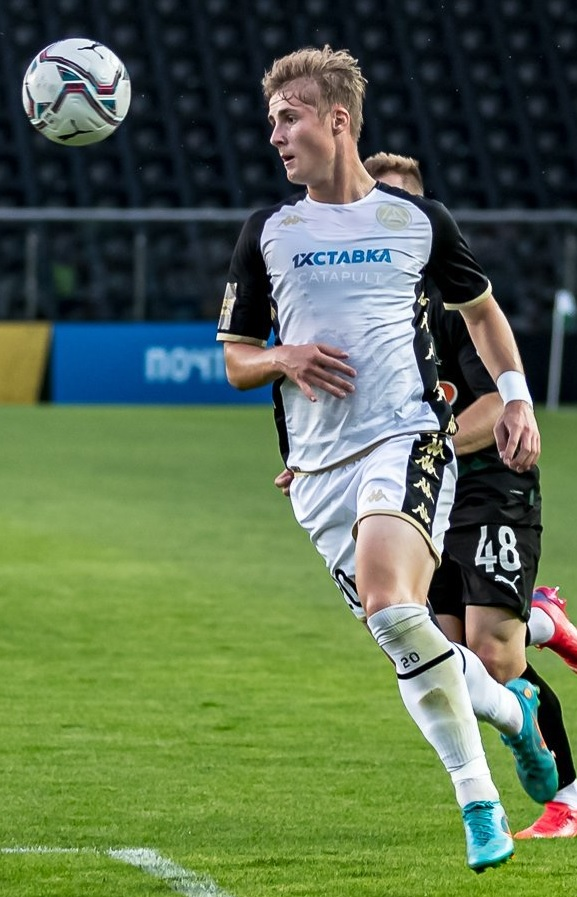
- Marukhin with Akron Tolyatti in 2022

Personal information
- Full name: Vladimir Sergeyevich Marukhin
- Date of birth: 6 July 2003 (age 23)
- Height: 1.80 m (5 ft 11 in)
- Position: Midfielder

Youth career
- –2020: UOR #5 Yegoryevsk
- 2020–2021: Lokomotiv Moscow

Senior career*
Years	Team	Apps	(Gls)
2021–2023	Akron Tolyatti	40	(7)
2023	→ Volga Ulyanovsk (loan)	5	(0)
2023–2024	Neftekhimik Nizhnekamsk	4	(0)
2024	→ Naftan Novopolotsk (loan)	12	(2)
2024–2025	Sibir Novosibirsk	28	(3)
2025–2026	Dynamo Kirov	14	(0)
- * Club domestic league appearances and goals as of 14 June 2026

Vladimir Sergeyevich Marukhin (Russian: Владимир Сергеевич Марухин; born 6 July 2003) is a Russian football midfielder.

== Club career ==
He made his debut in the Russian Football National League for FC Akron Tolyatti on 25 July 2021 in a game against FC Metallurg Lipetsk.
