= 2021–22 Russian Football National League 2 =

Russian Football National League 2
- Season: 2021–22
- Promoted: Dynamo Makhachkala (Group 1); Shinnik Yaroslavl (Group 2); Rodina Moscow (Group 3); Volga Ulyanovsk (Group 4)
- Matches: 1,139
- Goals: 3,263 (2.86 per match)
- Total attendance: 332,365
- Average attendance: 292

The 2021–22 Russian Football National League 2 is the third highest division in Russian football. The Russian Football National League 2 is geographically divided into 4 groups. The winners of each zone are automatically promoted into the National Football League. The bottom finishers of each zone lose professional status and are relegated into the Amateur Football League.

== Group 1 (South) ==
=== Standings ===
Pos	Team	Pld	W	D	L	GF	GA	GD	Pts	Promotion or relegation
1	Dynamo Makhachkala (P)	32	25	5	2	62	12	+50	80	Promotion to Russian National Football League
2	SKA Rostov-on-Don	32	24	4	4	74	22	+52	76	
3	Chayka	32	21	7	4	88	24	+64	70	
4	Forte	32	17	10	5	55	31	+24	61	
5	Chernomorets	32	18	6	8	70	35	+35	60	
6	Kuban-Holding	32	15	9	8	46	31	+15	54	
7	Legion Dynamo	32	12	10	10	44	31	+13	46	
8	Biolog	32	11	11	10	50	45	+5	44	
9	Anzhi (Note: Failed FNL2 licensing, dissolved.) (D)	32	13	9	10	46	35	+11	42 (Note: Anzhi deducted 6 points.)	Failed to obtain license for the next season, then dissolved.
10	Spartak Nalchik	32	10	10	12	32	28	+4	40	
11	Druzhba	32	7	11	14	25	44	−19	32	
12	Mashuk-KMV	32	7	10	15	47	54	−7	31	
13	Dynamo Stavropol	32	7	8	17	40	57	−17	29	
14	Tuapse (Note: Relegated after having not obtained license for the next season) (D)	32	12	2	18	36	60	−24	29 (Note: FC Tuapse deducted 9 points.)	Failed to obtain license for the next season, then dissolved.
15	Rotor-2 (Note: Relegated due to their first team's relegation from the FNL.) (R)	32	5	6	21	26	74	−48	21	Relegation to Amateur Football League
16	Alania-2	32	2	6	24	32	97	−65	12	
17	Yessentuki	32	2	4	26	16	106	−90	10	

Updated to match(es) played on 5 June 2022. Source: soccerway.com
Rules for classification: 1. points won; 2. games won; 3. points in head-to-head matches; 4. games won in head-to-head matches; 5. goal difference in head-to-head matches; 6. goals scored in head-to-head matches; 7. away goals in head-to-head matches; 8. total goal difference; 9. total goals scored; 10. total away goals scored.
(D) Disqualified; (P) Promoted; (R) Relegated

== Group 2 (West) ==
=== Group A ===
==== Standings ====
Pos	Team	Pld	W	D	L	GF	GA	GD	Pts	Promotion or relegation
1	Tver	18	12	5	1	34	14	+20	41	Qualification for the Promotion round
2	Leningradets	18	12	4	2	42	17	+25	40	Qualification for the Promotion round
3	Krasava	18	9	4	5	28	14	+14	31	Qualification for the Promotion round
4	Dynamo Saint Petersburg	18	8	4	6	25	22	+3	28	Qualification for the Promotion round
5	Zvezda Saint Petersburg	18	8	2	8	26	23	+3	26	Qualification for the Promotion round
6	Kairat Moscow	18	6	5	7	23	28	−5	23	Qualification for the Promotion round
7	Zenit-2	18	5	4	9	25	40	−15	19	Qualification for the Relegation round
8	Luki-Energiya	18	4	3	11	16	38	−22	15	Qualification for the Relegation round
9	Baltika-2	18	4	2	12	17	27	−10	14	Qualification for the Relegation round
10	Chita	18	2	7	9	14	27	−13	13	Qualification for the Relegation round
11	Smolensk	0	0	0	0	0	0	0	0	Team withdrew (Note: On Aug 2, FC Smolensk withdrew due financial troubles, their results are eliminated from the general table.)

Updated to match(es) played on 14 November 2021. Source: soccerway.com
Rules for classification: 1. points won; 2. games won; 3. points in head-to-head matches; 4. games won in head-to-head matches; 5. goal difference in head-to-head matches; 6. goals scored in head-to-head matches; 7. away goals in head-to-head matches; 8. total goal difference; 9. total goals scored; 10. total away goals scored.

=== Group B ===
==== Standings ====
Pos	Team	Pld	W	D	L	GF	GA	GD	Pts	Promotion or relegation
1	Shinnik	20	17	1	2	38	8	+30	52	Qualification for the Promotion round
2	Dynamo-2 Moscow	20	10	8	2	40	17	+23	38	Qualification for the Promotion round
3	Kazanka	20	9	4	7	25	17	+8	31	Qualification for the Promotion round
4	Yenisey-2	20	9	3	8	24	27	−3	30	Qualification for the Promotion round
5	Murom	20	7	7	6	26	18	+8	28	Qualification for the Promotion round
6	Volna	20	8	4	8	28	31	−3	28	Qualification for the Promotion round
7	Olimp-Dolgoprudny-2	20	7	5	8	27	24	+3	26	Qualification for the Relegation round
8	Khimik	20	5	6	9	18	36	−18	21	Qualification for the Relegation round
9	Torpedo Vladimir	20	5	3	12	16	35	−19	18	Qualification for the Relegation round
10	Znamya Truda	20	5	4	11	25	32	−7	16 (Note: Znamya Truda deducted 3 points for submitting forged documents.)	Qualification for the Relegation round
11	Chertanovo	20	4	3	13	16	38	−22	15	Qualification for the Relegation round

Updated to match(es) played on 14 November 2021. Source: soccerway.com
Rules for classification: 1. points won; 2. games won; 3. points in head-to-head matches; 4. games won in head-to-head matches; 5. goal difference in head-to-head matches; 6. goals scored in head-to-head matches; 7. away goals in head-to-head matches; 8. total goal difference; 9. total goals scored; 10. total away goals scored.

=== Promotion Group ===
==== Standings ====
Pos	Team	Pld	W	D	L	GF	GA	GD	Pts	Promotion or relegation
1	Shinnik (P)	21	17	3	1	37	10	+27	54	Promotion to Russian National Football League
2	Tver	21	11	6	4	42	22	+20	39	
3	Leningradets	21	11	2	8	30	20	+10	35	
4	Murom	21	10	4	7	23	12	+11	34	
5	Krasava (Note: They were declined license.) (R)	21	8	5	8	32	30	+2	29	Relegation to Russian Amateur Football League
6	Kairat Moscow (Note: Dissolved after the season.) (W)	21	8	5	8	29	35	−6	29	Withdrew
7	Zvezda Saint Petersburg	21	8	3	10	29	28	+1	27	
8	Volna	21	7	6	8	33	44	−11	27	
9	Dynamo-2 Moscow	21	6	7	8	27	28	−1	25	
10	Dynamo Saint Petersburg	21	5	5	11	22	35	−13	20	
11	Yenisey-2	21	6	2	13	20	41	−21	20	
12	Kazanka (Note: Dissolved after the season.) (W)	21	2	6	13	13	32	−19	12	Withdrew

Updated to match(es) played on 5 June 2022. Source: soccerway.com
Rules for classification: 1. points won; 2. games won; 3. points in head-to-head matches; 4. games won in head-to-head matches; 5. goal difference in head-to-head matches; 6. goals scored in head-to-head matches; 7. away goals in head-to-head matches; 8. total goal difference; 9. total goals scored; 10. total away goals scored.
(P) Promoted; (R) Relegated; (W) ?

=== Relegation Group ===
==== Standings ====
Pos	Team	Pld	W	D	L	GF	GA	GD	Pts	Promotion or relegation
1	Torpedo Vladimir	16	9	2	5	23	20	+3	29	
2	Olimp-Dolgoprudny-2 (Note: Denied license.) (R)	16	8	4	4	24	17	+7	28	Relegation to Amateur Football League
3	Zenit-2	16	8	2	6	42	28	+14	26	
4	Znamya Truda	16	8	1	7	29	21	+8	25	
5	Baltika-2	16	6	4	6	17	19	−2	22	
6	Chertanovo	16	6	4	6	16	23	−7	22	
7	Luki-Energiya	16	6	2	8	24	25	−1	20	
8	Chita	16	5	3	8	18	23	−5	18	
9	Khimik	16	3	4	9	16	33	−17	13	

Updated to match(es) played on 5 June 2022. Source: soccerway.com
Rules for classification: 1. points won; 2. games won; 3. points in head-to-head matches; 4. games won in head-to-head matches; 5. goal difference in head-to-head matches; 6. goals scored in head-to-head matches; 7. away goals in head-to-head matches; 8. total goal difference; 9. total goals scored; 10. total away goals scored.
(R) Relegated

== Group 3 (Center) ==
=== Group A ===
==== Standings ====
Pos	Team	Pld	W	D	L	GF	GA	GD	Pts	Promotion or relegation
1	Rodina	20	16	3	1	58	16	+42	51	Qualification for the Promotion round
2	Saransk	20	14	2	4	44	20	+24	44	Qualification for the Promotion round
3	Strogino	20	13	2	5	40	27	+13	41	Qualification for the Promotion round
4	Peresvet	20	9	4	7	36	27	+9	31	Qualification for the Promotion round
5	SKA-Khabarovsk-2	20	8	5	7	29	23	+6	29	Qualification for the Promotion round
6	Khimki-M	20	7	5	8	31	23	+8	26	Qualification for the Promotion round
7	Saturn	20	7	3	10	31	32	−1	24	Qualification for the Relegation round
8	Kolomna	20	6	2	12	32	57	−25	20	Qualification for the Relegation round
9	Znamya Noginsk	20	6	2	12	26	51	−25	20	Qualification for the Relegation round
10	Kvant	20	4	5	11	22	37	−15	17	Qualification for the Relegation round
11	Metallurg-Vidnoye	20	2	3	15	22	58	−36	9	Qualification for the Relegation round

Updated to match(es) played on 15 November 2021. Source: soccerway.com
Rules for classification: 1. points won; 2. games won; 3. points in head-to-head matches; 4. games won in head-to-head matches; 5. goal difference in head-to-head matches; 6. goals scored in head-to-head matches; 7. away goals in head-to-head matches; 8. total goal difference; 9. total goals scored; 10. total away goals scored.

=== Group B ===
==== Standings ====
Pos	Team	Pld	W	D	L	GF	GA	GD	Pts	Promotion or relegation
1	Sokol	20	14	4	2	38	10	+28	46	Qualification for the Promotion round
2	Dynamo Bryansk	20	11	8	1	37	11	+26	41	Qualification for the Promotion round
3	Salyut	20	12	3	5	32	20	+12	39	Qualification for the Promotion round
4	Dynamo Vladivostok	20	10	9	1	38	14	+24	39	Qualification for the Promotion round
5	Ryazan	20	11	3	6	27	17	+10	36	Qualification for the Promotion round
6	Avangard	20	7	5	8	27	27	0	26	Qualification for the Promotion round
7	Arsenal-2 Tula	20	7	3	10	26	31	−5	24	Qualification for the Relegation round
8	Zenit Penza	20	6	3	11	19	32	−13	21	Qualification for the Relegation round
9	Sakhalin	20	5	2	13	14	36	−22	17	Qualification for the Relegation round
10	Kaluga	20	2	5	13	10	27	−17	11	Qualification for the Relegation round
11	Fakel-M	20	1	3	16	6	49	−43	6	Qualification for the Relegation round

Updated to match(es) played on 14 November 2021. Source: soccerway.com
Rules for classification: 1. points won; 2. games won; 3. points in head-to-head matches; 4. games won in head-to-head matches; 5. goal difference in head-to-head matches; 6. goals scored in head-to-head matches; 7. away goals in head-to-head matches; 8. total goal difference; 9. total goals scored; 10. total away goals scored.

=== Promotion Group ===
==== Standings ====
Pos	Team	Pld	W	D	L	GF	GA	GD	Pts	Promotion or relegation
1	Rodina (P)	21	15	4	2	44	18	+26	49	Promotion to Russian National Football League
2	Sokol	21	11	6	4	44	21	+23	39	
3	Dynamo Bryansk	21	9	9	3	36	19	+17	36	
4	Salyut	21	11	3	7	33	24	+9	36	
5	Strogino	21	11	3	7	29	30	−1	36	
6	Saransk (D)	21	7	6	8	24	29	−5	27	Did not obtain license for the next season, disbanded.
7	Dynamo Vladivostok	21	5	12	4	24	29	−5	27	
8	Avangard	21	6	6	9	24	33	−9	24	
9	Khimki-M	21	5	7	9	27	26	+1	22	
10	SKA-Khabarovsk-2	21	3	8	10	15	24	−9	17	
11	Ryazan	21	2	8	11	13	30	−17	14	
12	Peresvet	21	2	6	13	23	53	−30	12	

Updated to match(es) played on 4 June 2022. Source: soccerway.com
Rules for classification: 1. points won; 2. games won; 3. points in head-to-head matches; 4. games won in head-to-head matches; 5. goal difference in head-to-head matches; 6. goals scored in head-to-head matches; 7. away goals in head-to-head matches; 8. total goal difference; 9. total goals scored; 10. total away goals scored.
(D) Disqualified; (P) Promoted

=== Relegation Group ===
==== Standings ====
Pos	Team	Pld	W	D	L	GF	GA	GD	Pts	Promotion or relegation
1	Zenit Penza	18	11	3	4	30	15	+15	36	
2	Sakhalin	18	10	2	6	28	23	+5	32	
3	Kaluga	18	9	4	5	28	17	+11	31	
4	Arsenal-2 Tula	18	9	3	6	32	25	+7	30	
5	Znamya Noginsk	18	8	3	7	28	30	−2	27	
6	Kvant	18	7	6	5	22	18	+4	27	
7	Saturn	18	8	1	9	33	28	+5	25	
8	Fakel-M	18	6	0	12	18	28	−10	18	
9	Metallurg-Vidnoye (Note: Failed to obtain license for the next season.) (R)	18	5	2	11	26	42	−16	17	Relegation to Amateur Football League
10	Kolomna	18	5	0	13	26	45	−19	15	

Updated to match(es) played on 5 June 2022. Source: soccerway.com
Rules for classification: 1. points won; 2. games won; 3. points in head-to-head matches; 4. games won in head-to-head matches; 5. goal difference in head-to-head matches; 6. goals scored in head-to-head matches; 7. away goals in head-to-head matches; 8. total goal difference; 9. total goals scored; 10. total away goals scored.
(R) Relegated

== Group 4 (East) ==
=== Standings ===
Pos	Team	Pld	W	D	L	GF	GA	GD	Pts	Promotion or relegation
1	Volga (P)	28	18	8	2	57	20	+37	62	Promotion to Russian National Football League
2	Chelyabinsk	28	20	2	6	56	24	+32	62	
3	Tyumen	28	18	6	4	79	30	+49	60	
4	Amkar	28	16	4	8	43	28	+15	52	
5	Zvezda (Note: FC Zvezda Perm withdrew.) (D)	28	16	4	8	52	28	+24	52	Withdrew after the season.
6	Novosibirsk	28	15	5	8	40	24	+16	50	
7	Ural-2	28	12	6	10	48	39	+9	42	
8	Irtysh	28	10	8	10	50	49	+1	38	
9	Torpedo Miass	28	10	5	13	33	41	−8	35	
10	Spartak Tuymazy (Note: FC Spartak Tuymazy decided to discontinue their participation in professional league competition.) (R)	28	11	2	15	45	67	−22	32 (Note: Spartak Tuymazy deducted 3 points for submitting forged documents.)	Relegation to Amateur Football League
11	Orenburg-2	28	6	9	13	31	52	−21	27	
12	Dynamo Barnaul	28	7	5	16	29	42	−13	26	
13	Nosta	28	6	3	19	23	54	−31	21	
14	Zenit-Izhevsk	28	4	4	20	20	55	−35	16	
15	Lada-Tolyatti	28	3	5	20	25	78	−53	11 (Note: Lada-Tolyatti deducted 3 points for submitting forged documents.)	

Updated to match(es) played on 6 June 2022. Source: soccerway.com
Rules for classification: 1. points won; 2. games won; 3. points in head-to-head matches; 4. games won in head-to-head matches; 5. goal difference in head-to-head matches; 6. goals scored in head-to-head matches; 7. away goals in head-to-head matches; 8. total goal difference; 9. total goals scored; 10. total away goals scored.
(D) Disqualified; (P) Promoted; (R) Relegated
