= FC Olimp-Dolgoprudny-2 =

Russian football team based in Moscow

- Full name: Football Club Olimp-Dolgoprudny-2
- Founded: 2021
- Dissolved: 2022
- 2021–22: FNL 2, Group 2, 14th

FC Olimp-Dolgoprudny-2 (Russian: ФК «Олимп-Долгопрудный-2») was a Russian football team based in Dolgoprudny. It was the reserves club for FC Olimp-Dolgoprudny. After the parent club was promoted to the second-tier FNL for the 2021–22 season, the second team was licensed for the third-tier Russian FNL 2. The club was not licensed for the 2022–23 season. Most players moved to FC Kosmos Dolgoprudny.
