= FC Krasava =

Russian football team based in Moscow

Krasava
- Full name: Football Club Krasava
- Founded: 2021
- Dissolved: 2022
- Ground: SG Luzhniki, Moscow
- Capacity: 3,100
- President: Yevgeny Savin
- 2021–22: FNL 2, Group 2, 6th
- Website: https://krasavafc.com/
Home colours

Football Club Krasava (Russian: ФК «Красава») was a Russian football club. It was formally licensed as based in Odintsovo, but played the home games in Moscow. It was founded in 2021 by Yevgeny Savin, a former player and commentator whose popular YouTube channel is called "Krasava". It was licensed for the third-tier Russian FNL 2 for the 2021–22 season. The team was not able to find any pitch to play on anymore after its owner Savin expressed his disapprovals concerning the Russian invasion of Ukraine in 2022. It did not receive the license for the 2022–23 season. Savin then purchased Cypriot club Ypsonas FC and changed their name to Krasava ENY Ypsonas FC, also adopting a similar logo to FC Krasava.
