= FC Olimp-Dolgoprudny =

Russian football club

- Founded: 1998
- Dissolved: 2022
- Ground: Rodina Stadium, Khimki
- Capacity: 3,760
- Owner: Vladimir Belolipetsky/Viktor Vorobel/Aleksei Yegorov
- Chairman: Taras Vorobel
- Manager: Vacant
- League: TBD
- 2021–22: Russian Football National League, 15th
Home colours	Away colours	Third colours

FC Olimp-Dolgoprudny (Russian: ФК «Олимп-Долгопрудный») was a professional association football club from Dolgoprudny, Russia. It made its debut in the second-highest Russian Football National League in the 2021–22 season and was denied license by the Russian Football Union at the end of that season. It began competing in the third-tier Russian Professional Football League in the 2012–13 season.

== History ==
On 25 May 2020, FSC Dolgoprudny announced that it will merge into FC Olimp Khimki, with the new club called FC Olimp-Dolgoprudny. On 16 June 2020, the new club passed licensing for the Russian Football National League and applied for admission to the league, along with two other candidates. On 24 July 2020, Russian Football Union chose Alania Vladikavkaz to be promoted instead.

On 23 May 2021, Olimp-Dolgoprudny secured the first place in their PFL zone and promotion to the Russian Football National League for the 2021–22 season.

Following promotion, the main squad moved their base to Khimki and completely revamped the squad and coaching staff. A separate club, technically a farm-club of Olimp, was organized in the third tier as FC Olimp-Dolgoprudny-2. Several players who secured promotion in the previous season moved to that new club.

On 3 June 2022, the Russian Football Union confirmed their decision to not grant Olimp-Dolgoprudny the RFS-2 license that is necessary to play in the FNL. Their appeal was not considered as it was not filed according to the procedure. The club did not announce at the time whether it will apply for the FNL 2 license or not, and eventually they did not.

== Notable players ==
Former Russia national football team players Aleksandr Filimonov, Alan Kusov, Nikita Bazhenov and Andrei Mostovoy represented Dolgoprudny.
