= List of Russian football transfers summer 2022 =

This is a list of Russian football transfers in the 2022 summer transfer window by club. Only clubs of the 2022–23 Russian Premier League are included.

== Russian Premier League 2022–23 ==
=== Akhmat Grozny ===
In: Note: Flags indicate national team as defined under FIFA eligibility rules; some limited exceptions apply. Players may hold more than one non-FIFA nationality.

No.	Pos.	Nation	Player
1	GK	RUS	Mikhail Oparin (from Yenisey Krasnoyarsk)
4	DF	BIH	Darko Todorović (from (Austria) Red Bull Salzburg, previously on loan)
17	MF	RUS	Vladislav Karapuzov (on loan from Dynamo Moscow, previously end of loan)
18	MF	RUS	Vladislav Kamilov (from Ufa)
19	MF	RUS	Kirill Folmer (on loan from Rostov)
21	MF	RUS	Ivan Oleynikov (from Chayka Peschanokopskoye)
29	FW	RUS	Vladimir Ilyin (from Krasnodar)
44	DF	RUS	Yuri Zhuravlyov (from Ufa)
77	FW	RUS	Gamid Agalarov (from Ufa)
81	MF	RUS	Rakhim Chaadayev
89	MF	RUS	Akhmed Davlitgereyev

Out: Note: Flags indicate national team as defined under FIFA eligibility rules; some limited exceptions apply. Players may hold more than one non-FIFA nationality.

No.	Pos.	Nation	Player
5	DF	RUS	Vitali Lystsov (end of loan from Lokomotiv Moscow)
9	FW	RUS	Idris Umayev (on loan to Yenisey Krasnoyarsk)
11	MF	RUS	Igor Konovalov (end of loan from Rubin Kazan)
18	FW	CIV	Senin Sebai (to (Israel) Ironi Kiryat Shmona)
33	GK	RUS	Vitali Gudiyev (to Khimki)
42	GK	RUS	Aleksandr Melikhov (to (Armenia) Urartu)
47	MF	RUS	Daniil Utkin (end of loan from Krasnodar)
55	DF	RUS	Aleksandr Putsko (to Baltika Kaliningrad)
68	FW	RUS	Artyom Arkhipov (end of loan from Kuban Krasnodar)
98	MF	RUS	Tamerlan Girzishev (to Yessentuki)
—	MF	RUS	Nikita Karmayev (on loan to Rotor Volgograd, previously on loan to Kuban Krasnodar)
—	MF	POL	Konrad Michalak (to (Turkey) Konyaspor, previously on loan)
—	MF	RUS	Ilya Moseychuk (on loan to Kuban Krasnodar, previously on loan to Tekstilshchik Ivanovo)
—	FW	ROU	Gabriel Iancu (to (Romania) U Craiova 1948, previously on loan to (Romania) Farul Constanța)

=== CSKA Moscow ===
In: Note: Flags indicate national team as defined under FIFA eligibility rules; some limited exceptions apply. Players may hold more than one non-FIFA nationality.

No.	Pos.	Nation	Player
4	DF	BRA	Willyan Rocha (from (Portugal) Portimonense)
5	MF	SRB	Saša Zdjelar (from (Serbia) Partizan)
8	MF	COL	Jorge Carrascal (from (Argentina) River Plate, previously on loan)
9	FW	RUS	Fyodor Chalov (end of loan to (Switzerland) Basel)
20	MF	RUS	Konstantin Kuchayev (end of loan to Rubin Kazan)
21	FW	ARG	Adolfo Gaich (end of loan to (Spain) Huesca)
22	DF	SRB	Milan Gajić (from (Serbia) Red Star Belgrade)
27	DF	BRA	Moisés (on loan from (Brazil) Internacional)
62	DF	RUS	Vadim Karpov (end of loan to Tekstilshchik Ivanovo)
88	MF	CHI	Víctor Méndez (from (Chile) Unión Española)
—	DF	RUS	Vadim Konyukhov (end of loan to Zvezda Perm)

Out: Note: Flags indicate national team as defined under FIFA eligibility rules; some limited exceptions apply. Players may hold more than one non-FIFA nationality.

No.	Pos.	Nation	Player
2	DF	RUS	Mário Fernandes (contract suspended)
7	MF	RUS	Ilzat Akhmetov (to Krasnodar)
10	MF	RUS	Alan Dzagoev (to Rubin Kazan)
11	FW	NGR	Chidera Ejuke (on loan to (Germany) Hertha BSC)
13	DF	RUS	Maksim Yeleyev (to Metallurg Lipetsk)
23	DF	ISL	Hörður Björgvin Magnússon (to (Greece) Panathinaikos)
27	MF	CIV	Jean-Philippe Gbamin (end of loan from (England) Everton)
29	DF	SLO	Jaka Bijol (to (Italy) Udinese)
51	FW	RUS	Mikhail Zabotkin (to Metallurg Lipetsk, previously on loan to (Spain) Albacete Balompié)
52	MF	RUS	Vadim Konyukhov (on loan to Ufa)
53	MF	RUS	Zaur Tarba (to Alania Vladikavkaz)
54	DF	RUS	Yegor Truntayev (to Rodina-M Moscow)
64	DF	RUS	Aleksei Sukharev (to SKA Rostov-on-Don)
70	FW	RUS	Eduard Bagrintsev (to (Slovakia) Dubnica)
75	DF	RUS	Ruslan Daurov (to Alania Vladikavkaz)
94	MF	RUS	Stepan Yevsyutin (to Zvezda St. Petersburg)
97	MF	TUR	Yusuf Yazıcı (end of loan from (France) Lille)
—	MF	RUS	Tigran Avanesyan (on loan to Baltika Kaliningrad, previously on loan to Tekstilshchik Ivanovo)
—	MF	CRO	Kristijan Bistrović (on loan to (Italy) Lecce, previously on loan to (Turkey) Fatih Karagümrük)
—	MF	NOR	Emil Bohinen (to (Italy) Salernitana, previously on loan)
—	MF	RUS	Sergei Pryakhin (on loan to Baltika Kaliningrad, previously on loan to Kairat Moscow)
—	MF	RUS	Andrei Savinov (on loan to Shinnik Yaroslavl, previously on loan to Kairat Moscow)
—	MF	ISL	Arnór Sigurðsson (on loan to (Sweden) Norrköping, previously on loan to (Italy) Venezia)
—	MF	RUS	Vitaly Zhironkin (to Tekstilshchik Ivanovo, previously on loan to Kairat Moscow)
—	FW	RUS	Gocha Gogrichiani (to Baltika Kaliningrad, previously on loan to Tekstilshchik Ivanovo)
—	FW	BLR	Ilya Shkurin (on loan to (Israel) Maccabi Petah Tikva, previously on loan to (Poland) Raków Częstochowa)

=== Dynamo Moscow ===
In: Note: Flags indicate national team as defined under FIFA eligibility rules; some limited exceptions apply. Players may hold more than one non-FIFA nationality.

No.	Pos.	Nation	Player
2	DF	ISR	Eli Dasa (from (Netherlands) Vitesse)
6	DF	PAR	Roberto Fernández (from (Paraguay) Guaraní)
13	FW	CMR	Moumi Ngamaleu (from (Switzerland) Young Boys)
17	MF	NOR	Mathias Normann (on loan from Rostov)
18	DF	URU	Nicolás Marichal (from (Uruguay) Nacional)
34	MF	GEO	Luka Gagnidze (end of loan to (Poland) Raków Częstochowa)
49	FW	RUS	Olivier Kenfack
82	DF	RUS	Vadim Roldugin (from own academy)

Out: Note: Flags indicate national team as defined under FIFA eligibility rules; some limited exceptions apply. Players may hold more than one non-FIFA nationality.

No.	Pos.	Nation	Player
2	DF	URU	Guillermo Varela (on loan to (Brazil) Flamengo)
3	DF	RUS	Zaurbek Pliyev (to Ufa)
5	DF	PAR	Fabián Balbuena (on loan to (Brazil) Corinthians)
8	MF	CRO	Nikola Moro (on loan to (Italy) Bologna)
9	FW	CMR	Clinton N'Jie (to (Turkey) Sivasspor)
18	DF	UKR	Ivan Ordets (on loan to (Germany) VfL Bochum)
24	DF	RUS	Roman Yevgenyev (to Krylia Sovetov Samara)
37	MF	RUS	Taras Gagloyev (to Alania-2 Vladikavkaz)
45	GK	RUS	David Sangaré (to Rodina Moscow)
48	DF	RUS	Timur Fisenko (to Arsenal-2 Tula)
53	MF	POL	Sebastian Szymański (on loan to (Netherlands) Feyenoord)
61	MF	RUS	Artyom Kuznetsov (to Nosta Novotroitsk)
62	DF	RUS	Bogdan Zorin (to Neftekhimik Nizhnekamsk)
66	FW	RUS	Artyom Fisenko (to Arsenal-2 Tula)
77	MF	RUS	Vladislav Karapuzov (on loan to Akhmat Grozny, previously end of loan)
82	DF	RUS	Svyatoslav Tses (to Leningradets Leningrad Oblast)
87	FW	RUS	Andrey Mazurin (on loan to Alania Vladikavkaz)
94	DF	RUS	Yury Nesov (to Rodina-2 Moscow)
—	DF	RUS	Sergei Slepov (to Krasny, previously on loan to Rotor Volgograd)
—	DF	RUS	Robinzon Zvonkov (to Tver, previously on loan to Volgar Astrakhan)
—	MF	RUS	Igor Shkolik (on loan to Neftekhimik Nizhnekamsk, previously on loan to Rotor Volgograd)
—	FW	RUS	Maksim Danilin (on loan to Torpedo-2 Moscow, previously on loan to Neftekhimik Nizhnekamsk)
—	FW	RUS	Ilya Gomanyuk (to Tver, previously on loan to Volgar Astrakhan)
—	FW	RUS	Nikolay Komlichenko (to Rostov, previously on loan)

=== Fakel Voronezh ===
In: Note: Flags indicate national team as defined under FIFA eligibility rules; some limited exceptions apply. Players may hold more than one non-FIFA nationality.

No.	Pos.	Nation	Player
1	GK	RUS	Ilya Svinov (on loan from Spartak Moscow)
5	DF	RUS	Yevgeni Shlyakov (from (Romania) UTA Arad)
10	FW	RUS	Ilnur Alshin (from Baltika Kaliningrad)
13	DF	RUS	Ihor Kalinin (on loan from Rostov)
21	FW	RUS	Georgi Gongadze (from SKA-Khabarovsk)
35	GK	RUS	Vyacheslav Dorovskikh (from Fakel-M Voronezh)
33	MF	GEO	Irakli Kvekveskiri (from SKA-Khabarovsk)
47	DF	RUS	Sergei Bozhin (from Krylia Sovetov Samara)
56	FW	RUS	Matvey Ivakhnov (from Krasava)
76	MF	RUS	Nikita Yershov (from Fakel-M Voronezh)
78	MF	RUS	Daniil Chernyakov (from Lokomotiv Moscow)
85	DF	RUS	Yevgeny Morozov (on loan from Lokomotiv Moscow)

Out: Note: Flags indicate national team as defined under FIFA eligibility rules; some limited exceptions apply. Players may hold more than one non-FIFA nationality.

No.	Pos.	Nation	Player
1	GK	RUS	Sergei Yeshchenko (end of loan from Krasnodar)
10	DF	SRB	Nemanja Pejčinović (retired)
11	FW	RUS	Andrey Nikitin (end of loan from Lokomotiv Moscow)
17	FW	RUS	Vladimir Dyadyun (retired)
22	FW	RUS	Andrei Razborov (to Shinnik Yaroslavl)
30	GK	RUS	Dmitry Kortnev
50	FW	RUS	Denis Fayzullin (end of loan from Lokomotiv Moscow)
80	MF	RUS	Valeri Tsarukyan (on loan to Volgar Astrakhan)
—	MF	RUS	Ilya Mazurov (to Balashikha, previously on loan to SKA Rostov-on-Don)

=== Khimki ===
In: Note: Flags indicate national team as defined under FIFA eligibility rules; some limited exceptions apply. Players may hold more than one non-FIFA nationality.

No.	Pos.	Nation	Player
1	GK	RUS	Anton Mitryushkin (from (Germany) Dynamo Dresden)
3	DF	RUS	Irakli Chezhiya (from Olimp-Dolgoprudny)
5	DF	RUS	Aleksei Nikitin (from Ufa)
11	MF	RUS	Aleksandr Lomovitsky (on loan from Rubin Kazan)
17	MF	RUS	Aleksandr Zuyev (from Rubin Kazan)
19	DF	RUS	Artur Chyorny (from Lokomotiv Moscow)
27	FW	RUS	Said-Ali Akhmayev (from SKA-Khabarovsk)
33	GK	RUS	Vitali Gudiyev (from Akhmat Grozny)
42	MF	CIV	Roman Mory Gbane (on loan from (Croatia) BSK Bijelo Brdo)
58	FW	RUS	Yegor Shmarov
77	MF	RUS	Reziuan Mirzov (from Spartak Moscow, previously on loan)
88	FW	RUS	Denis Davydov (from Znamya Truda Orekhovo-Zuyevo)
90	MF	RUS	Daniil Kamlashev (on loan from Strogino Moscow)
99	MF	RUS	Ayaz Guliyev (from Arsenal Tula)

Out: Note: Flags indicate national team as defined under FIFA eligibility rules; some limited exceptions apply. Players may hold more than one non-FIFA nationality.

No.	Pos.	Nation	Player
1	GK	RUS	Yegor Generalov (to (Belarus) Minsk)
11	DF	RUS	Elmir Nabiullin (to Pari NN)
14	MF	SWE	Besard Šabović (to (Sweden) Djurgården)
17	MF	RUS	Pavel Mamayev
18	MF	RUS	Yuri Zhirkov
24	MF	NGR	Lawrence Nicholas (to (Turkey) Fatih Karagümrük)
27	MF	ARM	David Davidyan (on loan to (Armenia) Pyunik)
29	MF	RUS	Yevgeni Cherkes (to Neftekhimik Nizhnekamsk)
31	MF	RUS	Vadim Bagayev (to Alania-2 Vladikavkaz)
39	DF	RUS	Erik Gubiyev (to Alania-2 Vladikavkaz)
39	FW	SUI	Kemal Ademi (on loan to (Germany) SV Sandhausen, previously on loan to (Germany) SC Paderborn 07)
46	FW	RUS	Aleksandr Olenyov (to Dynamo Bryansk)
47	DF	RUS	Roman Petrov (to Elektron Veliky Novgorod)
49	DF	RUS	Filip Anton Gililov (to Tekstilshchik Ivanovo)
65	MF	RUS	Kirill Rulyov (to Balashikha)
67	DF	RUS	Gleb Zakharov (end of loan from Rodina Moscow)
74	FW	RUS	Yegor Rumyantsev (to Zorkiy Krasnogorsk)
80	DF	RUS	Maksim Zhumabekov (on loan to (Belarus) Vitebsk)
83	FW	RUS	Vladislav Alyapin (to Strogino Moscow)
88	DF	GEO	Gia Grigalava (to Arsenal Tula)
99	DF	RUS	Aleksandr Shmarov (to Kosmos Dolgoprudny)
—	GK	RUS	Vitali Sychyov (to Akron Tolyatti, previously on loan to Olimp-Dolgoprudny)
—	DF	RUS	Kirill Bolshakov (on loan to Arsenal Tula, previously on loan to Kuban Krasnodar)
—	DF	RUS	Valentin Paltsev (on loan to KAMAZ Naberezhnye Chelny, previously from KAMAZ)
—	MF	SWE	Filip Dagerstål (on loan to (Poland) Lech Poznań, previously on loan to (Sweden) Norrköping)
—	MF	RUS	Danila Yanov (on loan to Arsenal Tula, previously from (Latvia) Riga)
—	FW	RUS	Nikita Balakhontsev (to Tyumen, previously on loan to Olimp-Dolgoprudny)
—	FW	ARM	Arshak Koryan (on loan to Alania Vladikavkaz, previously on loan to Orenburg)

=== Krasnodar ===
In: Note: Flags indicate national team as defined under FIFA eligibility rules; some limited exceptions apply. Players may hold more than one non-FIFA nationality.

No.	Pos.	Nation	Player
6	DF	ECU	Cristian Ramírez (end of contract suspension)
7	MF	RUS	Ilzat Akhmetov (from CSKA Moscow)
9	FW	COL	Jhon Córdoba (end of contract suspension)
14	MF	SRB	Mihajlo Banjac (from (Serbia) TSC Bačka Topola)
16	MF	CPV	Kevin Pina (from (Portugal) Chaves)
19	FW	ANG	João Batxi (from (Portugal) Chaves)
21	FW	RUS	Danil Karpov (from Tyumen)
22	DF	RUS	Stanislav Puzanov (from own academy)
29	DF	RUS	Ruslan Babayan (from own academy)
31	DF	BRA	Kaio Pantaleão (end of contract suspension)
34	GK	RUS	Daniil Golikov (from own academy)
40	FW	NGR	Olakunle Olusegun (from (Bulgaria) Botev Plovdiv, previously on loan)
52	DF	RUS	Kirill Dvornikov (from own academy)
53	DF	RUS	Aleksandr Kulikov (from own academy)
56	DF	RUS	Ruslan Chobanov (from own academy)
61	MF	NGR	Ifeanyi David Nduka (from (Bulgaria) Botev Plovdiv, previously on loan)
63	MF	TJK	Alidzhoni Ayni (from (Tajikistan) Regar-TadAZ Tursunzoda)
85	FW	NGR	Jonathan Okoronkwo (from (Bulgaria) Botev Plovdiv, previously on loan)
96	FW	RUS	Aleksandr Koksharov (from own academy)

Out: Note: Flags indicate national team as defined under FIFA eligibility rules; some limited exceptions apply. Players may hold more than one non-FIFA nationality.

No.	Pos.	Nation	Player
1	GK	RUS	Yevgeni Gorodov (retired)
4	DF	BLR	Alyaksandr Martynovich (to Rubin Kazan)
8	MF	RUS	Yury Gazinsky (to Ural Yekarerinburg)
18	DF	RUS	Yevgeni Chernov (on loan to Rostov)
20	FW	NOR	Erik Botheim (to (Italy) Salernitana)
29	FW	RUS	Vladimir Ilyin (to Akhmat Grozny)
37	FW	RUS	Ilya Vorotnikov (to SKA Rostov-on-Don)
50	DF	RUS	Vitali Stezhko (to Yenisey Krasnoyarsk)
51	DF	RUS	Artyom Datsenko (to Tver)
56	MF	RUS	Bogdan Reykhmen (to Torpedo Moscow)
63	FW	RUS	Nikita Sergeyev
75	MF	RUS	Oleg Korotkov (to SKA-Khabarovsk-2)
80	GK	RUS	Nikita Kokarev (on loan to Rotor Volgograd)
81	FW	RUS	Leon Sabua (to (Armenia) Urartu)
86	DF	RUS	Daniil Kornyushin (to Pari NN)
93	FW	RUS	Magomed-Shapi Suleymanov (on loan to (Israel) Hapoel Be'er Sheva, previously on loan to (Turkey) Giresunspor)
—	GK	RUS	Sergei Yeshchenko (to Kuban Krasnodar, previously on loan to Fakel Voronezh)
—	DF	RUS	Leo Goglichidze (to Ural Yekaterinburg, previously on loan)
—	DF	RUS	Ilya Martynov (to Rotor Volgograd, previously on loan)
—	MF	POL	Grzegorz Krychowiak (on loan to (Saudi Arabia) Al Shabab, previously on loan to (Greece) AEK Athens)
—	MF	RUS	Daniil Utkin (to Rostov, previously on loan to Akhmat Grozny)
—	MF	NED	Tonny Vilhena (to (Spain) Espanyol, previously on loan)
—	FW	RUS	Igor Andreyev (to Rodina Moscow, previously on loan)
—	FW	DEN	Younes Namli (to (Netherlands) Sparta Rotterdam, previously on loan)

=== Krylia Sovetov Samara ===
In: Note: Flags indicate national team as defined under FIFA eligibility rules; some limited exceptions apply. Players may hold more than one non-FIFA nationality.

No.	Pos.	Nation	Player
6	MF	RUS	Sergei Babkin (on loan from Lokomotiv Moscow)
14	MF	RUS	Aleksandr Kovalenko (on loan from Sochi, previously to Sochi)
15	FW	RUS	Maksim Glushenkov (from Spartak Moscow, previously on loan)
17	MF	RUS	Vladimir Khubulov (from Alania Vladikavkaz)
19	FW	RUS	Nikita Khlusov (from Leningradets Leningrad Oblast)
20	MF	BIH	Amar Rahmanović (from (Turkey) Konyaspor)
24	DF	RUS	Roman Yevgenyev (from Dynamo Moscow)
30	MF	SRB	Aleksandar Ćirković (from (Serbia) Voždovac)
31	DF	RUS	Georgi Zotov (from Rubin Kazan)
44	DF	CRO	Mateo Barać (from Sochi, previously on loan)
73	FW	RUS	Vladislav Shitov (on loan from Spartak Moscow)
95	DF	RUS	Ilya Gaponov (from Spartak Moscow, previously on loan)

Out: Note: Flags indicate national team as defined under FIFA eligibility rules; some limited exceptions apply. Players may hold more than one non-FIFA nationality.

No.	Pos.	Nation	Player
10	FW	RUS	Vladislav Sarveli (to Sochi)
17	MF	RUS	Anton Zinkovsky (to Spartak Moscow)
47	DF	RUS	Sergei Bozhin (to Fakel Voronezh)
52	MF	RUS	Danila Smirnov (to Volgar Astrakhan)
66	DF	RUS	Yan Gudkov (on loan to Kuban Krasnodar)
71	GK	RUS	Danil Beltyukov (to Zenit-Izhevsk)
85	FW	RUS	Ivan Ignatyev (end of loan from Rubin Kazan)
93	MF	RUS	Dmitry Motovichyov (to Veles Moscow)
99	FW	RUS	Maksim Kanunnikov
—	GK	RUS	Nikita Yavorsky (on loan to Tekstilshchik Ivanovo, previously on loan to Chertanovo Moscow)
—	DF	RUS	Nikita Pershin (on loan to Zvezda St. Petersburg, previously on loan to Chertanovo Moscow)
—	DF	RUS	Aleksei Nikitenkov (on loan to Zvezda St. Petersburg, previously on loan to Metallurg Lipetsk)
—	MF	RUS	Dmitri Velikorodny (on loan to Zvezda St. Petersburg, previously on loan to Metallurg Lipetsk)
—	FW	RUS	Leonid Gerchikov (on loan to Zvezda St. Petersburg, previously on loan to Metallurg Lipetsk)
—	FW	RUS	Dmitri Molchanov (to Dynamo Bryansk, previously on loan)
—	FW	RUS	Yegor Pankov (on loan to Zvezda St. Petersburg, previously on loan to Chertanovo Moscow)

=== Lokomotiv Moscow ===
In: Note: Flags indicate national team as defined under FIFA eligibility rules; some limited exceptions apply. Players may hold more than one non-FIFA nationality.

No.	Pos.	Nation	Player
3	DF	BRA	Lucas Fasson (from (Brazil) Athletico Paranaense)
9	FW	RUS	Ivan Ignatyev (from Rubin Kazan)
12	DF	ALB	Mario Mitaj (from (Greece) AEK Athens)
20	DF	RUS	Ivan Kuzmichyov (from Ural Yekaterinburg)
27	FW	RUS	Vadim Rakov (from own academy)
29	FW	BRA	Pedrinho (from (Brazil) Red Bull Bragantino)
77	FW	MNE	Marko Rakonjac (from (Serbia) Čukarički)

Out: Note: Flags indicate national team as defined under FIFA eligibility rules; some limited exceptions apply. Players may hold more than one non-FIFA nationality.

No.	Pos.	Nation	Player
8	MF	FRA	Alexis Beka Beka (to (France) Nice)
9	FW	CZE	Jan Kuchta (on loan to (Czech Republic) Sparta Prague)
28	DF	FIN	Boris Rotenberg (retired)
31	DF	POL	Maciej Rybus (to Spartak Moscow)
37	DF	RUS	Yury Kudrevaty (to Salyut Belgorod)
39	MF	RUS	Ilya Gritsak (to Yenisey-2 Krasnoyarsk)
40	DF	RUS	Vladimir Abramov (to Kaluga)
41	MF	RUS	Daniil Kotelnikov (to Khimik Dzerzhinsk)
42	DF	RUS	Lev Ushakhin (to Ufa)
44	MF	RUS	Ilya Vinnikov (to Chernomorets Novorossiysk)
46	MF	RUS	Ivan Kotelnikov (to SKA Rostov-on-Don)
47	MF	RUS	Ivan Shmakov (to Rotor Volgograd)
48	DF	RUS	Maksim Aktisov (to Tver)
49	MF	RUS	Grigory Borisenko (to Baltika Kaliningrad)
51	DF	RUS	Kirill Kiryanin (to Tver)
52	GK	RUS	Aleksandr Koryakin (to Baltika Kaliningrad)
57	FW	RUS	Matvey Pershin (to Zvezda St. Petersburg)
58	MF	RUS	Daniil Zaretsky (to Dynamo Barnaul)
63	MF	RUS	Nikita Sharkov (to Rotor Volgograd)
70	FW	RUS	Yegor Yeliseyenko (to Strogino Moscow)
71	DF	RUS	Artur Chyorny (to Khimki)
73	MF	RUS	Maksim Petrov (on loan to Alania Vladikavkaz)
75	MF	RUS	Sergei Babkin (on loan to Krylia Sovetov Samara)
78	DF	RUS	Daniil Chernyakov (to Fakel Voronezh)
81	FW	RUS	Nikita Khlynov (on loan to Forte Taganrog)
86	MF	RUS	Timofey Baraboshkin (to Sakhalinets Moscow)
90	MF	BLR	Kirill Zinovich (to (Portugal) Vitória de Guimarães)
91	DF	RUS	Aleksey Kazarinov (to Forte Taganrog)
94	MF	RUS	Dmitri Rybchinsky (on loan to Pari NN)
97	MF	RUS	Denis Valter (to Strogino Moscow)
99	DF	RUS	Marat Bokoyev (to Veles Moscow)
—	DF	RUS	Vitali Lystsov (released, previously on loan to Akhmat Grozny)
—	DF	RUS	Yevgeny Morozov (on loan to Fakel Voronezh, previously on loan to Volgar Astrakhan)
—	DF	RUS	Vladimir Sholokh (to Torpedo Vladimir, previously on loan to Avangard Kursk)
—	FW	RUS	Denis Fayzullin (to Irtysh Omsk, previously on loan to Fakel Voronezh)
—	FW	RUS	Aleksei Mironov (to Rostov, previously on loan to Orenburg)
—	FW	RUS	Andrey Nikitin (on loan to Ufa, previously on loan to Fakel Voronezh)

=== Orenburg ===
In: Note: Flags indicate national team as defined under FIFA eligibility rules; some limited exceptions apply. Players may hold more than one non-FIFA nationality.

No.	Pos.	Nation	Player
7	FW	RUS	Stepan Oganesyan (on loan from Spartak Moscow)
8	MF	BIH	Ivan Bašić (from (Bosnia and Herzegovina) Zrinjski Mostar)
9	FW	ARG	Braian Mansilla (on loan from (Argentina) Racing)
10	FW	RUS	Dmitry Vorobyov (end of loan to Sochi)
20	FW	PAR	Diego Acosta (from KAMAZ Naberezhnye Chelny)
21	MF	ARG	Gabriel Florentín (from (Argentina) Argentinos Juniors)
22	DF	BLR	Aleksandr Pavlovets (from Rostov)
23	MF	ARG	Lucas Vera (on loan from (Argentina) Lanús)
55	MF	RUS	Kirill Kaplenko (from Zenit St. Petersburg, previously on loan)
70	MF	RUS	Batraz Gurtsiyev (from Alania Vladikavkaz)
80	MF	CRC	Jimmy Marín (from (Costa Rica) Saprissa)

Out: Note: Flags indicate national team as defined under FIFA eligibility rules; some limited exceptions apply. Players may hold more than one non-FIFA nationality.

No.	Pos.	Nation	Player
6	DF	RUS	Savely Kozlov (retired)
7	FW	RUS	Nikolai Prudnikov
8	FW	ARM	Arshak Koryan (end of loan from Khimki)
9	MF	RUS	Artyom Shabolin (end of loan from Ural Yekaterinburg)
13	FW	RUS	Vladimir Obukhov (doping ban)
20	FW	GHA	Joel Fameyeh (to Rubin Kazan)
23	MF	RUS	Sergei Breyev (retired)
58	DF	RUS	Adesoye Oyevole (retired)
82	GK	RUS	Platon Zakharchuk (on loan to Amkar Perm)
83	MF	RUS	Aleksei Mironov (end of loan from Lokomotiv Moscow)
—	MF	RUS	Yevgeni Bolotov (on loan to Tyumen, previously on loan to Forte Taganrog)
—	MF	RUS	Ilya Vorobyov (to Leningradets Leningrad Oblast, previously on loan to Veles Moscow)
—	DF	RUS	Ivan Lapshov (released, previously on loan to Yenisey Krasnoyarsk)

=== Pari Nizhny Novgorod ===
In: Note: Flags indicate national team as defined under FIFA eligibility rules; some limited exceptions apply. Players may hold more than one non-FIFA nationality.

No.	Pos.	Nation	Player
4	MF	RUS	Ilya Zhigulyov (from (Poland) Zagłębie Lubin)
7	FW	RUS	Edgar Sevikyan (from (Spain) Levante)
8	MF	MLI	Mamadou Maiga (from Veles Moscow)
9	FW	RUS	Vyacheslav Krotov (from Ufa)
14	MF	RUS	Yaroslav Mikhaylov (on loan from Zenit St. Petersburg)
17	DF	RUS	Elmir Nabiullin (from Khimki)
18	MF	RUS	David Kobesov (from Alania Vladikavkaz)
42	FW	RUS	Vladislav Feshchenko (from Tom Tomsk)
44	DF	RUS	Daniil Kornyushin (from Krasnodar)
71	MF	RUS	Stepan Sokolovsky (from Arsenal-2 Tula)
86	DF	RUS	Ilya Agapov (from Spartak Moscow)
90	MF	RUS	Konstantin Shiltsov (on loan from Spartak Moscow)
94	MF	RUS	Dmitri Rybchinsky (on loan from Lokomotiv Moscow)
99	FW	GUI	Momo Yansané (on loan from (Moldova) Sheriff Tiraspol)

Out: Note: Flags indicate national team as defined under FIFA eligibility rules; some limited exceptions apply. Players may hold more than one non-FIFA nationality.

No.	Pos.	Nation	Player
4	DF	HUN	Ákos Kecskés (to (Austria) LASK)
7	FW	CAN	Richie Ennin (end of loan from (Latvia) Spartaks Jūrmala)
14	MF	RUS	Kirill Kravtsov (end of loan from Zenit St. Petersburg)
15	DF	SRB	Ivan Miladinović (end of loan from Sochi)
17	MF	RUS	Igor Gorbunov (to Rubin Kazan)
31	MF	RUS	Denis Tkachuk (to Kuban Krasnodar)
34	DF	RUS	Aleksei Kozlov
35	GK	RUS	Ivan Migunov
36	FW	RUS	Ivan Bondarenko (to Kolomna)
45	MF	RUS	Aleksandr Grunichev (to Khimik Dzerzhinsk)
46	MF	RUS	Yegor Sinitsyn (to Khimik Dzerzhinsk)
48	MF	RUS	Ivan Sutugin (to Khimik Dzerzhinsk)
77	MF	RUS	Pavel Karasyov (to Rotor Volgograd)
—	MF	RUS	Aleksandr Sapeta (to Volga Ulyanovsk, previously on loan to Kuban Krasnodar)
—	MF	BLR	Aleksandr Shestyuk (to (Belarus) Dynamo Brest, previously on loan to (Latvia) RFS)
—	MF	RUS	Dmitri Yugaldin (on loan to Kuban Krasnodar, previously on loan to Irtysh Omsk)

=== Rostov ===
In: Note: Flags indicate national team as defined under FIFA eligibility rules; some limited exceptions apply. Players may hold more than one non-FIFA nationality.

No.	Pos.	Nation	Player
1	GK	RUS	Nikita Medvedev (from Rubin Kazan)
8	FW	RUS	Aleksei Mironov (from Lokomotiv Moscow)
18	DF	RUS	Danila Prokhin (end of loan to Sochi)
24	DF	RUS	Konstantin Kovalyov (end of loan to Baltika Kaliningrad)
27	FW	RUS	Nikolay Komlichenko (from Dynamo Moscow, previously on loan)
28	DF	RUS	Yevgeni Chernov (on loan from Krasnodar)
32	DF	RUS	Aleksandr Smirnov (end of loan to KAMAZ Naberezhnye Chelny)
33	MF	RUS	Nikita Kolotiyevsky (end of loan to Torpedo Miass)
42	DF	RUS	Pavel Bocharov (from own academy)
47	MF	RUS	Daniil Utkin (from Krasnodar)
49	DF	RUS	Gleb Glazyrin (from own academy)
52	FW	RUS	Kirill Cheburakov (from own academy)
57	MF	RUS	Ilya Zhbanov (from UOR-5 Yegoryevsk)
59	MF	RUS	Denis Sergiyenko (from own academy)
65	DF	RUS	Nikita Kolyuchkin (from own academy)
68	GK	RUS	Aleksandr Grigoryev (from Zenit St. Petersburg academy)
73	MF	RUS	Imran Aznaurov (from CSKA Moscow academy)
74	MF	RUS	Alibeg Akhmedov
82	DF	RUS	Ivan Kuznetsov (from UOR-5 Yegoryevsk)
85	MF	RUS	Murad Alimov
88	MF	RUS	Kirill Shchetinin (from Zenit St. Petersburg, previously on loan)
97	MF	RUS	Ilya Zubenko (from own academy)
—	FW	MKD	David Toshevski (end of loan to (Slovakia) Zemplín Michalovce)

Out: Note: Flags indicate national team as defined under FIFA eligibility rules; some limited exceptions apply. Players may hold more than one non-FIFA nationality.

No.	Pos.	Nation	Player
1	GK	RUS	Yegor Baburin (on loan to Torpedo Moscow)
13	DF	RUS	Ihor Kalinin (on loan to Fakel Voronezh)
16	DF	ANG	Bastos (end of loan from (Saudi Arabia) Al-Ain)
22	FW	GAM	Ali Sowe (on loan to (Turkey) Ankaragücü)
25	MF	RUS	Kirill Folmer (on loan to Akhmat Grozny)
31	FW	RUS	Danila Proshlyakov (to Saturn Ramenskoye)
42	DF	RUS	Nikita Kotin (on loan to Sokol Saratov)
46	GK	RUS	Aleksandr Dyachkov (on loan to Dynamo Stavropol)
49	DF	RUS	Bogdan Rogochy (to Dynamo Stavropol)
52	MF	RUS	Roman Romanov (to Forte Taganrog)
53	FW	RUS	Kirill Moiseyev (on loan to Rubin Kazan)
57	MF	RUS	Maksim Martyanov (on loan to Leningradets Leningrad Oblast)
60	MF	ARM	Pavel Gorelov (on loan to (Armenia) Van)
72	MF	RUS	Daniil Nikolayev (to Kuban-Holding Pavlovskaya)
73	MF	RUS	Daniil Sokolov (end of loan from Leningradets Leningrad Oblast)
75	FW	RUS	Danil Khromov (on loan to Arsenal Tula)
76	MF	RUS	Danila Sukhomlinov (on loan to SKA-Khabarovsk)
90	FW	RUS	Maksim Turishchev (on loan to Torpedo Moscow)
97	MF	RUS	Artyom Isik (to Dynamo Stavropol)
98	DF	RUS	Sergey Kochkanyan (to Dynamo Stavropol)
—	GK	RUS	Vadim Lukyanov (to Kuban-Holding Pavlovskaya, previously on loan to Volga Ulyanovsk)
—	DF	RUS	Timofey Kalistratov (to Dynamo St. Petersburg, previously on loan)
—	DF	RUS	Mikhail Osinov (to Kosmos Dolgoprudny, previously on loan to Olimp-Dolgoprudny-2)
—	DF	BLR	Aleksandr Pavlovets (to Orenburg, previously on loan to (Poland) Warta Poznań)
—	DF	RUS	Tomas Rukas (to SKA-Khabarovsk, previously on loan to Yenisey Krasnoyarsk)
—	DF	RUS	Danila Vedernikov (on loan to Volgar Astrakhan, previously on loan to Kuban Krasnodar)
—	MF	SWE	Armin Gigović (on loan to (Denmark) OB, previously on loan to (Sweden) Helsingborg)
—	MF	JPN	Kento Hashimoto (on loan to (Spain) Huesca, previously on loan to (Japan) Vissel Kobe)
—	MF	RUS	Nikita Kupriyanov (to Kuban-Holding Pavlovskaya, previously on loan to SKA Rostov-on-Don)
—	MF	NOR	Mathias Normann (on loan to Dynamo Moscow, previously on loan to (England) Norwich City)
—	MF	RUS	Aleksandr Saplinov (on loan to Rubin Kazan, previously on loan to Ufa)
—	FW	SWE	Pontus Almqvist (on loan to (Poland) Pogoń Szczecin, previously on loan to (Netherlands) Utrecht)
—	FW	RUS	Tamaz Topuriya (to Spartak Nalchik, previously on loan to SKA Rostov-on-Don)

=== Sochi ===
In: Note: Flags indicate national team as defined under FIFA eligibility rules; some limited exceptions apply. Players may hold more than one non-FIFA nationality.

No.	Pos.	Nation	Player
4	DF	MLI	Moussa Sissako (from (Belgium) Standard Liège)
8	MF	RUS	Kirill Kravtsov (from Zenit St. Petersburg)
10	FW	RUS	Vladislav Sarveli (from Krylia Sovetov Samara)
11	FW	MNE	Luka Đorđević (from (Denmark) Vejle)
14	FW	RUS	Daniil Martovoy (from Tver)
19	MF	RUS	Timofey Shipunov (from Tver)
23	MF	RUS	Kirill Ushatov (from Tver)
26	DF	RUS	Artyom Meshchaninov (from Baltika Kaliningrad)
28	MF	RUS	Amir Batyrev (from Tver)
45	DF	SRB	Ivan Miladinović (end of loan to Nizhny Novgorod)

Out: Note: Flags indicate national team as defined under FIFA eligibility rules; some limited exceptions apply. Players may hold more than one non-FIFA nationality.

No.	Pos.	Nation	Player
5	DF	BRA	Rodrigão (to Zenit St. Petersburg)
5	MF	CIV	Victorien Angban (unregistered due to injury)
7	FW	RUS	Dmitry Vorobyov (end of loan from Orenburg)
7	MF	RUS	Yegor Prutsev (to (Serbia) Red Star Belgrade, previously on loan to Neftekhimik Nizhnekamsk)
8	MF	BUL	Ivelin Popov (to (Bulgaria) Levski Sofia)
11	FW	RUS	Maksim Barsov (to Neftekhimik Nizhnekamsk, previously on loan to Baltika Kaliningrad)
30	FW	COL	Mateo Cassierra (to Zenit St. Petersburg)
48	DF	RUS	Arkady Solop (to Kuban Krasnodar)
49	DF	RUS	Aleksandr Mironov (to Tver)
52	DF	RUS	Artyom Mironov (to Tver)
56	DF	RUS	Devid Kokoyev (to Tekstilshchik Ivanovo)
57	MF	RUS	Amur Khatsukov (to Spartak Nalchik)
58	MF	RUS	Maksim Khachatryan (to Tver)
61	GK	RUS	Timofey Kashintsev (to Tekstilshchik Ivanovo)
69	MF	RUS	Kirill Chursin (to Spartak Kostroma)
74	DF	RUS	Artyom Yamangulov (to Strogino Moscow)
79	DF	RUS	Timur Torlakyan (to Kolomna)
87	DF	RUS	Danila Prokhin (end of loan from Rostov)
—	GK	RUS	Sergey Samok (to Novosibirsk, previously on loan to SKA-Khabarovsk)
—	DF	CRO	Mateo Barać (to Krylia Sovetov Samara, previously on loan)
—	DF	RUS	Vadim Milyutin (on loan to Tyumen, previously on loan to (Belarus) Dynamo Brest)
—	MF	RUS	Maksim Kolmakov (on loan to Chayka Peschanokopskoye, previously on loan to (Belarus) Dynamo Brest)
—	MF	RUS	Aleksandr Kovalenko (on loan to Krylia Sovetov Samara, previously from Krylia Sovetov Samara)
—	MF	RUS	Anatoli Nemchenko (on loan to Kosmos Dolgoprudny, previously on loan to Olimp-Dolgoprudny-2)
—	FW	RUS	Daniil Pavlov (on loan to Tyumen, previously on loan to (Belarus) Dynamo Brest)

=== Spartak Moscow ===
In: Note: Flags indicate national team as defined under FIFA eligibility rules; some limited exceptions apply. Players may hold more than one non-FIFA nationality.

No.	Pos.	Nation	Player
9	FW	SEN	Keita Baldé (from (Italy) Cagliari)
13	DF	POL	Maciej Rybus (from Lokomotiv Moscow)
17	MF	RUS	Anton Zinkovsky (from Krylia Sovetov Samara)
32	DF	SLO	Miha Mevlja (from (Turkey) Alanyaspor)
35	MF	LUX	Christopher Martins (from (Switzerland) Young Boys, previously on loan)
36	FW	RUS	Artyom Sidorenkov
45	GK	RUS	Aleksandr Ignatyev (from own academy)
46	DF	RUS	Yury Petin (from own academy)
48	FW	RUS	Timur Kim (from own academy)
78	MF	RUS	Konstantin Mishin (from own academy)
81	MF	RUS	Artemy Gunko (from own academy)
83	DF	RUS	Dmitry Ivannikov (from own academy)
94	FW	RUS	Sergey Gayduk (from own academy)
96	MF	RUS	Rodion Kabakov (from own academy)

Out: Note: Flags indicate national team as defined under FIFA eligibility rules; some limited exceptions apply. Players may hold more than one non-FIFA nationality.

No.	Pos.	Nation	Player
2	DF	FRA	Samuel Gigot (end of loan from (France) Marseille)
3	DF	BEL	Maximiliano Caufriez (on loan to (France) Clermont)
10	MF	RUS	Zelimkhan Bakayev (to Zenit St. Petersburg)
13	FW	GEO	Nikoloz Kutateladze (to (France) Rodez)
29	DF	RUS	Ilya Kutepov (to Torpedo Moscow)
34	DF	RUS	Nikita Khodorchenko (to Zvezda St. Petersburg)
35	DF	RUS	Leonid Mironov (to Novosibirsk)
36	DF	RUS	Artyom Voropayev (to Rodina Moscow)
43	DF	RUS	Damir Shaykhtdinov (to Zenit St. Petersburg)
44	DF	RUS	Danil Trukhanov (on loan to Zvezda St. Petersburg)
46	MF	RUS	Artur Tumanyan (to Tver)
49	MF	RUS	Pavel Trifonov (to Rotor Volgograd)
51	MF	RUS	Nikita Trapitsyn (on loan to Rodina-2 Moscow)
53	MF	RUS	Ilyas Muminov (to SKA-Khabarovsk)
63	DF	RUS	Daniil Petrunin (to Shinnik Yaroslavl)
65	DF	RUS	Nikolai Tolstopyatov (on loan to KAMAZ Naberezhnye Chelny)
67	FW	RUS	Aleksandr Komissarov (to Alania Vladikavkaz)
70	FW	RUS	Aslan Mutaliyev (to Veles Moscow)
73	FW	RUS	Vladislav Shitov (on loan to Krylia Sovetov Samara)
74	MF	RUS	Dmitri Markitesov (to Rodina Moscow)
75	MF	RUS	Fanil Sungatulin (on loan to Ural Yekaterinburg)
78	MF	RUS	Maksim Danilin (to Rodina Moscow)
80	MF	RUS	Nikita Bakalyuk (on loan to Arsenal Tula)
81	DF	RUS	Vladislav Saumov (to Alania-2 Vladikavkaz)
82	MF	RUS	Ilya Levchenkov (to Kosmos Dolgoprudny)
83	MF	RUS	Maksim Laykin (on loan to Neftekhimik Nizhnekamsk)
84	FW	RUS	Stepan Oganesyan (on loan to Orenburg)
85	GK	RUS	Aleksandr Alekseyev (to Nosta Novotroitsk)
86	DF	RUS	Ilya Agapov (to Pari Nizhny Novgorod)
87	FW	RUS	Artur Maksimchuk (on loan to Novosibirsk, previously on loan to Akron Tolyatti)
88	GK	RUS	Ilya Svinov (on loan to Fakel Voronezh)
90	MF	RUS	Konstantin Shiltsov (on loan to Pari NN)
91	GK	RUS	Daniil Markov (to Tver)
94	DF	RUS	Ilya Detyonyshev (to Chayka Peschanokopskoye)
96	DF	RUS	Nikolay Genchu (to Tver)
—	DF	RUS	Ilya Gaponov (to Krylia Sovetov Samara, previously on loan)
—	DF	RUS	Ilya Golosov (on loan to Kuban Krasnodar, previously on loan to Rotor Volgograd)
—	DF	RUS	Nikita Morgunov (to Nosta Novotroitsk, previously on loan to Lada-Tolyatti)
—	MF	CZE	Alex Král (on loan to (Germany) Schalke 04, previously on loan to (England) West Ham United)
—	MF	RUS	Reziuan Mirzov (to Khimki, previously on loan)
—	MF	NED	Jorrit Hendrix (to (Germany) Fortuna Düsseldorf, previously on loan to (Netherlands) Feyenoord)
—	MF	NED	Guus Til (to (Netherlands) PSV, previously on loan to (Netherlands) Feyenoord)
—	MF	UZB	Oston Urunov (to Ural Yekaterinburg, previously on loan to Ufa)
—	FW	RUS	Maksim Glushenkov (to Krylia Sovetov Samara, previously on loan)
—	FW	SWE	Jordan Larsson (to (Germany) Schalke 04, previously on loan to (Sweden) AIK)
—	FW	ARG	Ezequiel Ponce (to (Spain) Elche, previously on loan)
—	FW	BRA	Pedro Rocha (to (Brazil) Fortaleza, previously on loan to (Brazil) Athletico Paranaense)

=== Torpedo Moscow ===
In: Note: Flags indicate national team as defined under FIFA eligibility rules; some limited exceptions apply. Players may hold more than one non-FIFA nationality.

No.	Pos.	Nation	Player
3	DF	RUS	Ilya Kutepov (from Spartak Moscow)
8	MF	RUS	Bogdan Reykhmen (from Krasnodar)
12	GK	RUS	Yegor Baburin (on loan from Rostov)
13	DF	SRB	Stefan Šapić (from (Serbia) Čukarički)
18	FW	RUS	David Karayev (from SKA-Khabarovsk)
19	FW	RUS	Maksim Turishchev (on loan from Rostov)
21	MF	FRA	Damien Le Tallec (from (Greece) AEK Athens)
22	MF	UZB	Khojimat Erkinov (from (Uzbekistan) Pakhtakor Tashkent)
23	MF	ARM	Artyom Simonyan (from Volgar Astrakhan)
24	MF	BIH	Igor Savić (from (Bosnia and Herzegovina) Zrinjski Mostar)
26	FW	HUN	Márk Koszta (from (South Korea) Ulsan Hyundai)
27	MF	MDA	Mihail Caimacov (on loan from (Croatia) Slaven Belupo)
28	DF	RUS	Igor Smolnikov (from Arsenal Tula)
90	DF	MNE	Bojan Roganović (from (Serbia) Čukarički)
97	MF	CRO	Mario Ćurić (from (Croatia) Šibenik)

Out: Note: Flags indicate national team as defined under FIFA eligibility rules; some limited exceptions apply. Players may hold more than one non-FIFA nationality.

No.	Pos.	Nation	Player
5	DF	RUS	Aleksei Shumskikh (to Arsenal Tula)
9	MF	RUS	Vladislav Adayev (to Rodina Moscow)
9	FW	RUS	Amur Kalmykov (to Rodina Moscow)
11	DF	RUS	Ivan Temnikov (to Ufa)
17	MF	BLR	Pavel Sedko (to (Belarus) Gomel)
17	MF	RUS	Dzambolat Tsallagov (to Kuban Krasnodar, previously from (Lithuania) DFK Dainava)
20	MF	RUS	Aleksei Pomerko (to Arsenal Tula)
24	FW	RUS	Yegor Dorokhov (on loan to Chelyabinsk, previously on loan to Veles Moscow)
30	DF	RUS	Ilya Yeliseyev (to Kaluga)
59	MF	RUS	Timur Abdrashitov (to Amkar Perm)
97	DF	RUS	Danil Poluboyarinov (on loan to Akron Tolyatti)
—	DF	RUS	Dmitri Redkovich (to Chertanovo Moscow, previously on loan to Metallurg Lipetsk)
—	MF	RUS	Gennadi Kiselyov (to Znamya Truda Orekhovo-Zuyevo, previously on loan to Metallurg Lipetsk)
—	FW	RUS	Konstantin Korzh (to Chayka Peschanokopskoye, previously on loan to Tom Tomsk)
—	MF	UKR	Andriy Kravchuk (to (Ukraine) Vorskla Poltava)

=== Ural Yekaterinburg ===
In: Note: Flags indicate national team as defined under FIFA eligibility rules; some limited exceptions apply. Players may hold more than one non-FIFA nationality.

No.	Pos.	Nation	Player
2	DF	CRO	Silvije Begić (from Rubin Kazan)
3	DF	RUS	Leo Goglichidze (from Krasnodar, previously on loan)
4	DF	CGO	Emmerson (from SKA-Khabarovsk)
6	MF	GUI	Ibrahima Cissé (from (Belgium) Seraing)
9	FW	SRB	Lazar Ranđelović (from (Greece) Olympiacos)
11	MF	RUS	Igor Konovalov (on loan from Rubin Kazan)
15	DF	UKR	Denys Kulakov (end of contract suspension)
17	MF	GEO	Luka Tsulukidze (end of loan to (Georgia (country)) Saburtalo Tbilisi)
18	MF	RUS	Yury Gazinsky (from Krasnodar)
20	MF	NED	Rai Vloet (from (Kazakhstan) Astana)
22	DF	RUS	Mingiyan Beveyev (from Yenisey Krasnoyarsk)
24	DF	BLR	Yegor Filipenko (from (Belarus) Shakhtyor Soligorsk)
55	MF	RUS	Artyom Shabolin (end of loan to Orenburg)
65	MF	RUS	Aleksandr Galimov (end of loan to SKA-Khabarovsk)
75	MF	RUS	Fanil Sungatulin (on loan from Spartak Moscow)
77	MF	UZB	Oston Urunov (from Spartak Moscow)
79	FW	RUS	Aleksei Kashtanov (on loan from Rodina Moscow)

Out: Note: Flags indicate national team as defined under FIFA eligibility rules; some limited exceptions apply. Players may hold more than one non-FIFA nationality.

No.	Pos.	Nation	Player
6	MF	POL	Rafał Augustyniak (to (Poland) Legia Warsaw)
8	MF	RUS	Roman Yemelyanov (on loan to Shinnik Yaroslavl)
9	FW	RUS	Mikhail Ageyev (on loan to Volgar Astrakhan)
24	FW	RUS	Kirill Kolesnichenko
25	DF	RUS	Ivan Kuzmichyov (to Lokomotiv Moscow)
28	MF	RUS	Yuri Bavin (on loan to SKA-Khabarovsk, previously on loan to Rotor Volgograd)
30	MF	RUS	Aleksey Yevseyev (on loan to Ufa)
62	GK	RUS	Davyd Alekseyev (to Dynamo Vladivostok)
66	DF	SRB	Dominik Dinga (to (Kazakhstan) Ordabasy)
68	GK	RUS	Mikhail Gaydash (to Sakhalinets Moscow)
71	MF	RUS	Daniil Arsentyev (on loan to Volga Ulyanovsk)
88	DF	RUS	Artyom Shmykov (on loan to Kuban Krasnodar)
95	DF	RUS	Chingiz Magomadov (on loan to Volga Ulyanovsk)
—	GK	RUS	Vladislav Poletayev (on loan to Forte Taganrog, previously on loan to Volga Ulyanovsk, previously on loan to Tom Tomsk)
—	GK	RUS	Oleg Baklov (released, previously on loan to KAMAZ Naberezhnye Chelny)
—	FW	RUS	Andrei Panyukov (to Veles Moscow, previously on loan to (Kazakhstan) Kyzylzhar)
—	DF	RUS	Nikita Chistyakov (on loan to Tyumen, previously on loan to Akron Tolyatti)
—	DF	RUS	Islamzhan Nasyrov (to Arsenal Tula, previously on loan to Tyumen)
—	FW	RUS	Artyom Maksimenko (on loan to Rotor Volgograd, previously on loan to Baltika Kaliningrad)
—	FW	RUS	Artyom Yusupov (on loan to Irtysh Omsk, previously on loan to Volgar Astrakhan)

=== Zenit Saint Petersburg ===
In: Note: Flags indicate national team as defined under FIFA eligibility rules; some limited exceptions apply. Players may hold more than one non-FIFA nationality.

No.	Pos.	Nation	Player
1	GK	BRA	Ivan (on loan from (Brazil) Corinthians)
7	MF	RUS	Zelimkhan Bakayev (from Spartak Moscow)
30	FW	COL	Mateo Cassierra (from Sochi)
31	MF	BRA	Gustavo Mantuan (on loan from (Brazil) Corinthians)
42	DF	RUS	Damir Shaykhtdinov (from Spartak Moscow)
47	DF	RUS	Serafim Abzalilov (from own academy)
48	DF	RUS	Maksim Sharov (from own academy)
49	FW	RUS	Igor Kozlov (from own academy)
55	DF	BRA	Rodrigão (from Sochi)
56	DF	RUS	Sergey Muradyan (from own academy)
57	DF	RUS	Nikita Lobov (from own academy)
59	DF	RUS	Yevgeny Tonevitsky (from own academy)
64	FW	RUS	Konstantin Voinkov (from own academy)
68	FW	RUS	Dmitry Samartsev (from own academy)
79	FW	RUS	Nikolay Solovyov (from own academy)
82	FW	RUS	Denis Orlov (from own academy)
85	GK	RUS	Sergey Butyrya (from Shinnik Yaroslavl)
86	FW	RUS	Yevgeny Pshennikov (from own academy)
87	MF	RUS	Savely Nikiforov (from own academy)
90	DF	RUS	Danil Savinykh (from Tom Tomsk)
94	MF	RUS	Danila Kozlov (from own academy)
96	FW	RUS	Aleksey Baranovsky (from own academy)
—	MF	RUS	Konstantin Troyanov (from Zvezda St. Petersburg)

Out: Note: Flags indicate national team as defined under FIFA eligibility rules; some limited exceptions apply. Players may hold more than one non-FIFA nationality.

No.	Pos.	Nation	Player
1	GK	RUS	Stanislav Kritsyuk (to (Portugal) Gil Vicente)
9	FW	BRA	Yuri Alberto (on loan to (Brazil) Corinthians)
22	FW	RUS	Artem Dzyuba (to (Turkey) Adana Demirspor)
27	MF	RUS	Magomed Ozdoyev (to (Turkey) Fatih Karagümrük)
31	GK	RUS	Mikhail Kizeyev (to Sever Murmansk)
34	DF	RUS	Matvey Troshchenkov (to SKA-Khabarovsk-2)
37	MF	RUS	Vadim Simutenkov (to Tyumen)
39	DF	RUS	Vasili Zapryagayev
42	DF	RUS	Danila Varichev (to SKA Rostov-on-Don)
47	DF	RUS	Sergei Ivanov (to (Armenia) Alashkert)
48	DF	RUS	Arseny Zigangirov (to Baltika-BFU Kaliningrad)
53	DF	RUS	Aleksandr Sandrachuk (to Ufa)
56	MF	RUS	Kirill Khvastukhin (to Rodina-2 Moscow)
60	MF	RUS	Kirill Stolbov (on loan to Yenisey Krasnoyarsk)
64	MF	RUS	Kirill Kravtsov (to Sochi, previously on loan to Nizhny Novgorod)
68	FW	RUS	Ivan Korshunov (to SKA-Khabarovsk)
82	MF	RUS	Ivan Tarasov (to SKA-Khabarovsk)
90	MF	RUS	Ivan Andreyev (end of loan from Tom Tomsk)
92	DF	BLR	Nikita Supranovich (end of loan from (Belarus) BATE Borisov)
97	MF	RUS	Nikita Koldunov (to Chayka Peschanokopskoye)
98	DF	RUS	Vladislav Masalsky (to Yadro St. Petersburg)
98	MF	RUS	Yaroslav Mikhaylov (on loan to Pari NN, previously on loan to (Germany) Schalke 04)
—	GK	RUS	Nikolai Rybikov (to Veles Moscow, previously on loan to Chayka Peschanokopskoye)
—	MF	RUS	Kirill Kaplenko (to Orenburg, previously on loan)
—	MF	RUS	Daniil Knyazev (to Baltika Kaliningrad, previously on loan)
—	MF	RUS	Kirill Shchetinin (to Rostov, previously on loan)
—	FW	RUS	Maksim Bachinsky (to Leningradets Leningrad Oblast, previously on loan to Tekstilshchik Ivanovo)
—	FW	RUS	Daniil Shamkin (on loan to KAMAZ Naberezhnye Chelny, previously on loan to Baltika Kaliningrad)
