= 2021–22 FC Rostov season =

FC Rostov
2021–22 season
- Chairman: Artashes Arutyunyants
- Manager: Valeri Karpin (until 2 August); Yury Syomin (4 August - 25 September); Zaur Tedeyev (Acting Head Coach) (from 25 September); Vitaly Kafanov (26 October - 10 March); Valeri Karpin (from 10 March)
- Stadium: Rostov Arena
- Premier League: 9th
- Russian Cup: Round of 32
- Top goalscorer: League: Dmitry Poloz (14); All: Dmitry Poloz (14)
- Highest home attendance: 25,082 vs Spartak Moscow (24 April 2022)
- Lowest home attendance: 0 vs Dynamo Moscow (23 July 2021); 0 vs Zenit St.Petersburg (1 August 2021); 0 vs CSKA Moscow (14 August 2021)
- Average home league attendance: 7,948 (14 May 2022)
Home colours	Away colours

The 2021–22 season was FC Rostov's 92nd season in existence and the club's 13th consecutive season in the top flight of Russian football. In addition to the domestic league, Rostov participated in this season's editions of the Russian Cup.

== Season events ==
On 18 May, Rostov announced the signing of Kirill Bozhenov from Khimki on a five-year contract.

On 5 June, Rostov announced the signing of Danila Prokhin from Zenit St.Petersburg and then imeditaly loaned him out to Sochi for the season.

On 10 June, Rostov announced the permanent signing of Ali Sowe from CSKA Sofia on a contract until 2025 following a successful loan spell.

On 11 June, Rostov announced the loan signing of Nikolay Komlichenko from Dynamo Moscow for the season.

On 12 June, Rostov announced the signing of Ihor Kalinin from Ural Yekaterinburg on a five-year contract.

On 15 July, Kirill Bozhenov returned to Khimki on a season-long loan deal.

On 26 July, Kirill Shchetinin joined Rostov on loan a season-long loan deal from Zenit St.Petersburg.

On 2 August, Valeri Karpin left his role as head coach of Rostov. Two days later, 4 August, Rostov announced Yuri Semin as their new head coach on a two-year contract.

On 5 August, Rostov announced the loan-return of Bastos from Al-Ain, until the end of the season.

On 19 August, Vadim Lukyanov joined Volga Ulyanovsk on loan for the season, whilst Tomas Rukas joined Yenisey Krasnoyarsk on loan from Rostov for the season.

On 29 August, Mathias Normann joined Norwich City on a season-long loan deal, with the option to make the move permanent.

On 31 August, David Toshevski joined Górnik Zabrze on a season-long loan deal, with the option to make the move permanent.

On 25 September, Yury Syomin resigned as head coach of Rostov after 6weeks, with Zaur Tedeyev being appointed as acting head coach on the same day. On 26 October, Vitaly Kafanov was announced as Rostov's new head coach.

Kirill Bozhenov returned to Rostov from his loan at Khimki on 18 December. Three days later, 21 December, Rostov announced that Pavel Mamayev had left the club after his contract had expired.

On 23 December, Rostov announced the signing of Magnus Knudsen to a 4.5year contract from Lillestrøm. Two days later, 25 December, Rostov announced that goalkeeper Maksim Rudakov had joined Honka on loan for the 2022 Veikkausliiga season.

On 28 December, Konstantin Kovalyov joined Baltika Kaliningrad on loan for the remainder of the season.

On 29 December, Rostov announced the signing of Aleksandr Selyava from Dinamo Minsk on a contract until the end of the season with the option of an extension.

On 18 January, Rostov announced the signing of Aleksandr Silyanov from Lokomotiv Moscow on loan for the remainder of the season.

On 20 January, Rostov announced the signing of Stepan Melnikov from Spartak Moscow to a four-and-a-half-year contract.

On 9 February, Rostov announced the signing of Yegor Golenkov from Sigma Olomouc to a five-year contract.

On 24 February, Rostov's home match against Krylia Sovetov was postponed due to the local airport being shut by the Federal Air Transport Agency in relation to the Russian invasion of Ukraine.

On 10 March, Valeri Karpin was re-appointed as head coach of Rostov, with Vitaly Kafanov returning to the position of assistant coach. The following day, 11 March, Dennis Hadžikadunić joined Malmö on loan until the end of 2022.

On 16 March, Rostov's postponed round 19 match against Krylia Sovetov was rescheduled for 6 April.

== Squad ==
As of match played 21 May 2022

No.	Name	Nationality	Position	Date of birth (age)	Signed from	Signed in	Contract ends	Apps.	Goals
Goalkeepers
1	Yegor Baburin	(Russia)	GK	9 August 1993 (aged 28)	Zenit St.Petersburg	2019	2024	21	0
30	Sergei Pesyakov	(Russia)	GK	16 December 1988 (aged 33)	Spartak Moscow	2017	2022	119	0
46	Aleksandr Dyachkov	(Russia)	GK	6 June 2003 (aged 18)	Academy	2021		0	0
Defenders
4	Denis Terentyev	(Russia)	DF	13 August 1992 (aged 29)	Zenit St.Petersburg	2020		91	1
13	Ihor Kalinin	(Ukraine)	DF	11 November 1995 (aged 26)	Ural Yekaterinburg	2021	2026	15	0
29	Aleksandr Mukhin	(Russia)	DF	28 April 2002 (aged 20)	Lokomotiv Moscow	2021		7	0
42	Nikita Kotin	(Russia)	DF	1 September 2002 (aged 19)	Academy	2021		1	0
45	Aleksandr Silyanov	(Russia)	DF	17 February 2001 (aged 21)	loan from Lokomotiv Moscow	2022	2022	12	0
55	Maksim Osipenko	(Russia)	DF	16 May 1994 (aged 28)	Tambov	2020	2024	69	2
71	Nikolai Poyarkov	(Russia)	DF	16 October 1999 (aged 22)	Lokomotiv Moscow	2019		32	0
87	Andrei Langovich	(Russia)	DF	28 May 2003 (aged 18)	Academy	2021	2027	18	0
92	Viktor Melyokhin	(Russia)	DF	16 December 2003 (aged 18)	Academy	2021	2027	18	0
96	Aleksandr Gapechkin	(Russia)	DF	16 June 2002 (aged 19)	Academy	2019		1	0
	Kirill Bozhenov	(Russia)	DF	7 December 2000 (aged 21)	Khimki	2021	2026	0	0
Midfielders
15	Danil Glebov	(Russia)	MF	3 November 1999 (aged 22)	Anzhi Makhachkala	2019		91	5
19	Khoren Bayramyan	(Armenia)	MF	7 January 1992 (aged 30)	Academy	2011		145	9
23	Roman Tugarev	(Russia)	MF	22 July 1998 (aged 23)	Lokomotiv Moscow	2021		30	3
25	Kirill Folmer	(Russia)	MF	25 February 2000 (aged 22)	Ufa	2021		23	0
38	Aleksandr Selyava	(Belarus)	MF	17 May 1992 (aged 30)	Dinamo Minsk	2021	2022	7	0
60	Pavel Gorelov	(Armenia)	MF	20 January 2003 (aged 19)	Academy	2021		1	0
72	Daniil Nikolayev	(Russia)	MF	10 May 2002 (aged 20)	Academy	2021		1	0
77	Stepan Melnikov	(Russia)	MF	25 April 2002 (aged 20)	Spartak Moscow	2022	2026	5	0
88	Kirill Shchetinin	(Russia)	MF	17 January 2002 (aged 20)	loan from Zenit St.Petersburg	2021	2022	13	2
97	Artyom Isik	(Russia)	MF	28 April 2002 (aged 20)	Academy	2021		2	0
Forwards
7	Dmitry Poloz	(Russia)	FW	12 July 1991 (aged 30)	Sochi	2020		212	49
22	Ali Sowe	(The Gambia)	FW	14 June 1994 (aged 27)	CSKA Sofia	2021	2025	31	7
27	Nikolay Komlichenko	(Russia)	FW	29 June 1995 (aged 26)	loan from Dynamo Moscow	2021	2022	29	8
69	Yegor Golenkov	(Russia)	FW	7 July 1999 (aged 22)	Sigma Olomouc	2022	2026	10	0
76	Danila Sukhomlinov	(Russia)	FW	13 August 2002 (aged 19)	Saturn-Master Egorjevsk	2020		25	0
89	Artyom Muamba	(Russia)	FW	19 April 2003 (aged 19)	Academy	2021		1	0
90	Maksim Turishchev	(Russia)	FW	5 March 2002 (aged 20)	Lokomotiv Moscow	2021	2025	8	0
	Danila Proshlyakov	(Russia)	FW	8 March 2000 (aged 22)	Spartak Moscow	2019	2024	7	0
Youth team
51	Yevgeni Cherkes	(Russia)	MF	23 June 2001 (aged 20)	Salyut Belgorod	2019		1	0
52	Roman Romanov	(Russia)	MF	28 March 2003 (aged 19)	Academy	2020		1	1
58	Tamaz Topuriya	(Russia)	FW	29 January 2002 (aged 20)	Academy	2020		1	0
60	Pavel Gorelov	(Russia)	MF	22 January 2003 (aged 19)	Academy	2020		1	0
61	Nikita Kashtan	(Russia)	MF	1 September 2003 (aged 18)	Academy	2020		1	0
62	Ivan Komarov	(Russia)	MF	15 April 2003 (aged 19)	Academy	2020		2	0
65	Timofey Kalistratov	(Russia)	DF	18 February 2003 (aged 19)	Academy	2020		1	0
66	Vilyam Rogava	(Russia)	DF	25 January 2003 (aged 19)	Academy	2020		1	0
72	Vladimir Abramov	(Russia)	DF	5 April 2002 (aged 20)	Academy	2020		1	0
75	Danil Khromov	(Russia)	FW	25 December 2002 (aged 19)	Academy	2020		2	0
82	Maksim Stavtsev	(Russia)	MF	29 January 2004 (aged 18)	Academy	2020		1	0
84	Aleksey Kornienko	(Russia)	FW	15 January 2003 (aged 19)	Academy	2020		1	0
98	Sergey Kochkanyan	(Armenia)	MF	5 May 2003 (aged 19)	Academy	2020		1	0
	Kirill Girnyk	(Russia)	DF	31 March 2003 (aged 19)	Academy	2020		1	0
Contracts suspended
8	Armin Gigović	(Sweden)	MF	6 April 2002 (aged 20)	Helsingborgs IF	2020	2025	30	1
11	Pontus Almqvist	(Sweden)	MF	10 July 1999 (aged 22)	IFK Norrköping	2020	2025	39	3
16	Bastos	(Angola)	DF	23 November 1991 (aged 30)	loan from Al-Ain	2021	2022	99	5
18	Kento Hashimoto	(Japan)	MF	16 August 1993 (aged 28)	FC Tokyo	2020	2024	30	8
Out on loan
5	Dennis Hadžikadunić	(Bosnia and Herzegovina)	DF	9 July 1998 (aged 23)	Malmö FF	2018		69	3
14	Magnus Knudsen	(Norway)	MF	15 June 2001 (aged 20)	Lillestrøm	2021	2026	1	0
24	Konstantin Kovalyov	(Russia)	DF	14 January 2000 (aged 22)	Avangard Kursk	2020		1	0
77	Maksim Rudakov	(Russia)	GK	22 January 1996 (aged 26)	Zenit St.Petersburg	2020	2024	1	0
	Vadim Lukyanov	(Russia)	GK	16 December 2002 (aged 19)	Kuban Krasnodar	2020		0	0
	Aleksandr Pavlovets	(Belarus)	DF	13 August 1996 (aged 25)	Dynamo Brest	2020		5	0
	Tomas Rukas	(Lithuania)	DF	4 September 1996 (aged 25)	Yenisey Krasnoyarsk	2021		0	0
	Danila Prokhin	(Russia)	DF	24 May 2001 (aged 20)	Zenit St.Petersburg	2021		0	0
	Aleksandr Smirnov	(Russia)	DF	12 April 1996 (aged 26)	Khimki	2020		1	0
	Danila Vedernikov	(Russia)	DF	6 June 2001 (aged 20)	Krasnodar	2019		7	0
	Mathias Normann	(Norway)	MF	28 May 1996 (aged 25)	Brighton & Hove Albion	2019		56	2
	Nikita Kolotiyevsky	(Russia)	MF	4 March 2001 (aged 21)	Academy	2020		1	0
	Nikita Kupriyanov	(Russia)	MF	23 April 2002 (aged 20)	Academy	2020		1	0
	Mikhail Osinov	(Russia)	MF	29 December 2000 (aged 21)	Academy	2017		1	0
	Aleksandr Saplinov	(Russia)	MF	12 August 1997 (aged 24)	Baltika Kaliningrad	2019	2023	26	3
	David Toshevski	(North Macedonia)	FW	16 July 2001 (aged 20)	Rabotnički	2020	2025	7	0
Left during the season
10	Pavel Mamayev	(Russia)	MF	17 September 1988 (aged 33)	Krasnodar	2019	2021	26	4
47	Aleksandr Dolgov	(Russia)	FW	24 September 1998 (aged 23)	Lokomotiv Moscow	2019	2024	22	1
	Artur Sokhiyev	(Russia)	FW	27 September 2002 (aged 19)	Spartak Vladikavkaz	2020		3	0

=== Contract suspensions ===
Note: Flags indicate national team as defined under FIFA eligibility rules; some limited exceptions apply. Players may hold more than one non-FIFA nationality.

No.	Pos.	Nation	Player
—	MF	JPN	Kento Hashimoto (at Vissel Kobe)
—	MF	SWE	Pontus Almqvist (at Utrecht)
—	MF	SWE	Armin Gigović (at Helsingborg)

=== Out on loan ===
Note: Flags indicate national team as defined under FIFA eligibility rules; some limited exceptions apply. Players may hold more than one non-FIFA nationality.

No.	Pos.	Nation	Player
24	DF	RUS	Konstantin Kovalyov (at Baltika Kaliningrad)
77	GK	RUS	Maksim Rudakov (at Honka)
—	GK	RUS	Vadim Lukyanov (at Volga Ulyanovsk)
—	DF	BLR	Aleksandr Pavlovets (at Kolos Kovalivka)
—	DF	LTU	Tomas Rukas (at Yenisey Krasnoyarsk)
—	DF	RUS	Danila Prokhin (at Sochi)
—	DF	RUS	Aleksandr Smirnov (at KAMAZ)
—	DF	RUS	Danila Vedernikov (at Kuban Krasnodar)

No.	Pos.	Nation	Player
—	MF	NOR	Magnus Knudsen (at Lillestrøm)
—	MF	NOR	Mathias Normann (at Norwich City)
—	MF	RUS	Nikita Kolotiyevsky (at Olimp-Dolgoprudny)
—	MF	RUS	Nikita Kupriyanov (at SKA Rostov-on-Don)
—	MF	RUS	Mikhail Osinov (at Olimp-Dolgoprudny)
—	MF	RUS	Aleksandr Saplinov (at Ufa)
—	FW	MKD	David Toshevski (at Górnik Zabrze)

== Transfers ==
=== In ===
Date	Position	Nationality	Name	From	Fee	Ref.
18 May 2021	DF	(Russia)	Kirill Bozhenov	Khimki	Undisclosed	
5 June 2021	DF	(Russia)	Danila Prokhin	Zenit St.Petersburg	Undisclosed	
12 June 2021	DF	(Russia)	Ihor Kalinin	Ural Yekaterinburg	Undisclosed	
10 June 2021	FW	(The Gambia)	Ali Sowe	CSKA Sofia	Undisclosed	
12 August 2021	DF	(Russia)	Nikita Kotin	Unattached	Free	
23 December 2021	MF	(Norway)	Magnus Knudsen	Lillestrøm	Undisclosed	
29 December 2021	MF	(Belarus)	Aleksandr Selyava	Dinamo Minsk	Undisclosed	
20 January 2022	FW	(Russia)	Stepan Melnikov	Spartak Moscow	Undisclosed	
9 February 2022	FW	(Russia)	Yegor Golenkov	Sigma Olomouc	Undisclosed	

=== Loans in ===
Date from	Position	Nationality	Name	From	Date to	Ref.
11 June 2021	FW	(Russia)	Nikolay Komlichenko	Dynamo Moscow	End of the season	
26 July 2021	MF	(Russia)	Kirill Shchetinin	Zenit St.Petersburg	End of the season	
5 August 2021	DF	(Angola)	Bastos	Al-Ain	End of the season	
18 January 2022	DF	(Russia)	Aleksandr Silyanov	Lokomotiv Moscow	End of the season	

=== Out ===
Date	Position	Nationality	Name	To	Fee	Ref.
3 June 2021	DF	(Russia)	Dmitri Chistyakov	Zenit St.Petersburg	Undisclosed	
3 September 2021	FW	(Russia)	Aleksandr Dolgov	Khimki	Undisclosed	
10 September 2021	FW	(Russia)	Artur Sokhiyev	Noravank	Undisclosed	

=== Loans out ===
Date from	Position	Nationality	Name	To	Date to	Ref.
14 August 2020	DF	(Russia)	Danila Vedernikov	Volgar Astrakhan	21 January 2022	
5 June 2021	DF	(Russia)	Danila Prokhin	Sochi	End of season	
16 June 2021	GK	(Russia)	Maksim Rudakov	Rotor Volgograd	10 August 2021	
16 June 2021	DF	(Russia)	Aleksandr Smirnov	SKA-Khabarovsk	12 January 2022	
24 June 2021	MF	(Russia)	Aleksandr Saplinov	Ufa	End of season	
7 July 2021	DF	(Belarus)	Aleksandr Pavlovets	Kolos Kovalivka	End of season	
9 July 2021	MF	(Russia)	Nikita Kolotievskiy	Olimp-Dolgoprudny	End of season	
9 July 2021	MF	(Russia)	Mikhail Osinov	Olimp-Dolgoprudny	End of season	
15 July 2021	DF	(Russia)	Kirill Bozhenov	Khimki	18 December 2021	
19 August 2021	GK	(Russia)	Vadim Lukyanov	Volga Ulyanovsk	End of season	
19 August 2021	DF	(Lithuania)	Tomas Rukas	Yenisey Krasnoyarsk	End of season	
29 August 2021	MF	(Norway)	Mathias Normann	Norwich City	End of season	
31 August 2021	FW	(North Macedonia)	David Toshevski	Górnik Zabrze	18 February 2022	
25 December 2021	GK	(Russia)	Maksim Rudakov	Honka	End of season	
28 December 2021	DF	(Russia)	Konstantin Kovalyov	Baltika Kaliningrad	End of season	
12 January 2022	DF	(Russia)	Aleksandr Smirnov	KAMAZ	End of season	
28 January 2022	DF	(Russia)	Danila Vedernikov	Kuban Krasnodar	End of season	
19 February 2022	FW	(North Macedonia)	David Toshevski	Zemplín Michalovce	End of season	
11 March 2022	DF	(Bosnia and Herzegovina)	Dennis Hadžikadunić	Malmö	31 December 2022	
24 March 2022	MF	(Norway)	Magnus Knudsen	Lillestrøm	30 June 2022	

=== Contract suspensions ===
Date	Position	Nationality	Name	Joined	Date	Ref.
17 March 2022	MF	(Sweden)	Pontus Almqvist	Utrecht	1 June 2022	
31 March 2022	MF	(Sweden)	Armin Gigović	Helsingborg	30 June 2022	
27 March 2022	MF	(Japan)	Kento Hashimoto	Vissel Kobe	30 June 2022	

=== Released ===
Date	Position	Nationality	Name	Joined	Date	Ref.
11 June 2021	MF	(Russia)	Georgi Makhatadze	Rotor Volgograd	11 June 2021	
3 July 2021	DF	(Russia)	Arseny Logashov	Kuban Krasnodar	8 July 2021	
4 July 2021	DF	(Russia)	Aleksei Kozlov	Nizhny Novgorod	9 July 2021	
9 August 2021	FW	(Russia)	Vladimir Obukhov	Orenburg	9 December 2021	
21 December 2021	MF	(Russia)	Pavel Mamayev	Khimki	21 December 2021	

== Friendlies ==
24 June 2021	Rostov (Russia)	2 – 2	(Hungary) Fehérvár	Austria
17:00 MSK (UTC+3)	Petryak 2'; Dárdai 5'	Report	Mamayev 29'; Folmer 54'

27 June 2021	Rostov (Russia)	1 – 2	(Croatia) Dinamo Zagreb	Austria
19:00 MSK (UTC+3)	Hashimoto 65'	Report	Menalo 9'; Stojanović 20'

1 July 2021	Rostov (Russia)	4 – 0	(Slovenia) Mura	Austria
19:00 MSK (UTC+3)	Sowe 15'; Komlichenko 52', 65'; Glebov 78'	Report

8 July 2021	Partizan (Serbia)	1 – 0	(Russia) Rostov	Austria
19:00 MSK (UTC+3)	M.Milovanović 68'	Report	A.Langovich (yellow card) 11'; Hadžikadunić (yellow card) 90+1'

12 July 2021	Rostov (Russia)	2 – 1	(Russia) Lokomotiv Moscow	Austria
12:00 MSK (UTC+3)	Komlichenko 65'; Tugarev 81'	Report	A.Chernyy (yellow card) 7'; I.Petukhov (yellow card) 41' (yellow-red card) 66'; Lisakovich (yellow card) 62'; M.Petrov 86'

12 July 2021	Kisvárda (Hungary)	2 – 1	(Russia) Rostov	Austria
19:00 MSK (UTC+3)	Mešanović 6', 31'	Report	Osipenko 74'

16 July 2021	Rostov (Russia)	1 – 0	(Israel) Beitar Jerusalem	Austria
16:00 MSK (UTC+3)		Report	Glebov (yellow card) 5'; Bayramyan (yellow card) 11'; Sowe 51'

17 July 2021	Budapest Honvéd (Hungary)	0 – 1	(Russia) Rostov	Austria
19:00 MSK (UTC+3)	Bőle 75'	Report

21 January 2022	Sparta Prague (Czech Republic)	0 – 2	(Russia) Rostov	Spain
17:45 MSK (UTC+3)	Haraslín 21'; (yellow card) 23'; Mukhin 70' (o.g.)	Report	Bozhenov (yellow card) 30'; Melyokhin (yellow card) 34'

28 January 2022	VfB Stuttgart (Germany)	2 – 1	(Russia) Rostov	Spain
13:00 MSK (UTC+3)	Millot (yellow card) 65'; Didavi (yellow card) 66'; Tibidi 87'; Förster 89' (pen.)	Report	Glebov 18'; Sukhomlinov (yellow card) 67'

3 February 2022	BK Häcken (Sweden)	0 – 0	(Russia) Rostov	Spain
18:00 MSK (UTC+3)	(yellow card) 70'; (yellow card) 81'	Report	Komlichenko (yellow card) 9'; (yellow card) 64'

9 February 2022	Linense (Spain)	1 – 2	(Russia) Rostov	La Línea, Spain
13:00 MSK (UTC+3)	A.Garcia 51'	Report	Shchetinin 60'; Golenkov 69'	Stadium: Municipal La Línea

9 February 2022	Haugesund (Norway)	2 – 0	(Russia) Rostov	Marbella, Spain
18:00 MSK (UTC+3)	Samuelsen 70'; 82'	Report

15 February 2022	Molde (Norway)	0 – 2	(Russia) Rostov	Marbella, Spain
18:00 MSK (UTC+3)		Report	Poloz 25'; Sowe 57'

20 February 2022	Krasnodar	2 – 2	Rostov	Marbella, Spain
17:45 MSK (UTC+3)	Botheim 15'; Claesson 25'	Report	Osipenko 30'; Poloz 58' (pen.); Melyokhin (yellow card) 67'; Komlichenko (yellow card) 71'	Stadium: Marbella Football Center; Referee: H.Rodriguez

== Competitions ==
=== Overview ===
Competition	First match	Last match	Starting round	Final position	Record							
Competition	First match	Last match	Starting round	Final position	Pld	W	D	L	GF	GA	GD	Win %
Premier League	23 July 2021	21 May 2022	Matchday 1	9th	30	10	8	12	47	51	−4	33.33
Russian Cup	22 September 2021	27 October 2021	Round of 32	Round of 32	2	0	0	2	0	3	−3	0.00
Total					32	10	8	14	47	54	−7	31.25

Last updated: 21 May 2022
Source: See Results

=== Premier League ===
==== League table ====
Pos	Team	Pld	W	D	L	GF	GA	GD	Pts
7	Akhmat Grozny	30	13	3	14	36	38	−2	42
8	Krylia Sovetov Samara	30	12	5	13	39	36	+3	41
9	Rostov	30	10	8	12	47	51	−4	38 (Note: Head-to-head points: Rostov 4, Spartak Moscow 1.)
10	Spartak Moscow	30	10	8	12	37	41	−4	38
11	Nizhny Novgorod	30	8	9	13	26	39	−13	33 (Note: Head-to-head points: Nizhny Novgorod 4, Ural Yekaterinburg 1.)

Source: Premier Liga
Rules for classification: 1) Points; 2) Head-to-head points; 3) Head-to-head matches won; 4) Head-to-head goal difference; 5) Head-to-head goals scored; 6) Matches won; 7) Goal difference; 8) Goals scored; 9) 2020–21 position (not applicable to final standings); 10) Play-off.

==== Results summary ====
Overall								Home						Away					
Pld	W	D	L	GF	GA	GD	Pts	W	D	L	GF	GA	GD	W	D	L	GF	GA	GD
30	10	8	12	47	51	−4	38	6	2	7	28	26	+2	4	6	5	19	25	−6

Last updated: 21 May 2022.
Source: See Results

==== Results by round ====
Round	1	2	3	4	5	6	7	8	9	10	11	12	13	14	15	16	17	18	19	20	21	22	23	24	25	26	27	28	29	30
Ground	H	H	A	H	A	A	H	A	H	A	A	H	A	H	Н	А	А	H	H	A	A	H	H	H	A	H	A	A	H	A
Result	L	L	D	L	W	D	D	L	L	W	L	W	D	W	D	L	D	L	L	W	D	L	W	W	W	W	L	D	W	L
Position	15	15	15	15	14	13	12	14	15	13	15	12	12	11	11	11	12	14	14	12	12	12	11	10	9	8	9	10	9	9

Updated to match(es) played on 21 May 2022. Source: See Results
A = Away; H = Home; W = Win; D = Draw; L = Loss

==== Results ====
23 July 2021 1	Rostov	0 – 2	Dynamo Moscow	Rostov-on-Don
20:00 MSK (UTC+3)	Sukhomlinov (yellow card) 30'; Hadžikadunić (yellow card) 40'	Report	Parshivlyuk (yellow card) 5'; Zakharyan 20'; Tyukavin 33'; Fomin (yellow card) 48'; Ordets (yellow card) 90+5'	Stadium: Rostov Arena; Attendance: 0 Referee: Vladimir Moskalyov
Note: Match played behind closed doors due to the COVID-19 pandemic in Russia.

1 August 2021 2	Rostov	2 – 4	Zenit St.Petersburg	Rostov-on-Don
20:00 MSK (UTC+3)	Komlichenko 45+' (pen.); Osipenko (yellow card) 50' (goal) 85'; Terentyev (yellow card) 60'; Kalinin (yellow card) 63'	Report	Yerokhin 30', 90+'; Azmoun 35' (pen.); Lovren (yellow card) 45+'; Wendel 75'; Kuzyayev (yellow card) 81'; Krugovoy (yellow card) 90+'	Stadium: Rostov Arena; Attendance: 0 Referee: Vitali Meshkov
Note: Match played behind closed doors due to the COVID-19 pandemic in Russia.

8 August 2021 3	Khimki	1 – 1	Rostov	Khimki
17:30 MSK (UTC+3)	Komlichenko 14'; Poloz (yellow card) 33'; Mamayev (yellow card) 37'; Bayramyan (yellow card) 69'	Report	Sebai (yellow card) 22'; Stojinović (yellow card) 35'; Glushakov 70' (pen.); Tikhy (yellow card) 90'	Stadium: Arena Khimki; Attendance: 555; Referee: Pavel Shadykhanov

14 August 2021 4	Rostov	1 – 3	CSKA Moscow	Rostov-on-Don
20:00 MSK (UTC+3)	Glebov 54'; Terentyev (yellow card) 90+3'	Report	Bijol 8'; Chalov 36'; Bohinen (yellow card) 78'; Maradishvili 89'	Stadium: Rostov Arena; Attendance: 0 Referee: Kirill Levnikov
Note: Match played behind closed doors due to the COVID-19 pandemic in Russia.

22 August 2021 5	Nizhny Novgorod	1 – 2	Rostov	Nizhny Novgorod
18:00 MSK (UTC+3)	Osipenko 3' (o.g.); Tkachuk (yellow card) 57'; Gotsuk (yellow card) 87'	Report	Hashimoto 36'; Hadžikadunić (yellow card) 42'; Normann (yellow card) 78'; Bastos (yellow card) 80'; Masoero 89' (o.g.)	Stadium: Nizhny Novgorod Stadium; Attendance: 991; Referee: Evgeny Kukulyak

27 August 2021 6	Ural Yekaterinburg	1 – 1	Rostov	Yekaterinburg
16:30 MSK (UTC+3)	Ibrahimaj (yellow card) 14'; Rykov (yellow card) 53'; Maksimenko 82'	Report	Poloz 76'	Stadium: Central Stadium; Attendance: 496; Referee: Artyom Lyubimov

12 September 2021 7	Rostov	1 – 1	Krasnodar	Rostov-on-Don
19:30 MSK (UTC+3)	Sukhomlinov (yellow card) 6'; Spajić 29' (o.g.); Almqvist (yellow card) 41'; Komlichenko (yellow card) 44'; Langovich (yellow card) 70'	Report	Krychowiak (yellow card) 7' (yellow-red card) 30'; Cabella (penalty missed) 42'; Gazinsky (yellow card) 51'; Spertsyan 65'; Ilyin (yellow card) 90+'	Stadium: Rostov Arena; Attendance: 5,669; Referee: Aleksei Matyunin

18 September 2021 8	Krylia Sovetov	4 – 2	Rostov	Samara
16:30 MSK (UTC+3)	Gorshkov (yellow card) 6'; Bastos 44' (o.g.); Begić 51'; Glushenkov 58'; Ivanisenya (yellow card) 71'; Sarveli 90+'	Report	Komlichenko 23'; Glebov 69'; Sowe (yellow card) 80'	Stadium: Solidarnost Arena; Attendance: 998; Referee: Igor Panin

26 September 2021 9	Rostov	1 – 2	Akhmat Grozny	Rostov-on-Don
16:30 MSK (UTC+3)	Melyokhin (yellow card) 71'; Poyarkov (yellow card) 78'; Poloz 90+'	Report	Semyonov (yellow card) 29'; Lystsov 36'; Konaté (yellow card) 43'; Konovalov 53' (pen.); Polyarus (yellow card) 64'; Kharin (yellow card) 72'; Utkin (yellow card) 74'	Stadium: Rostov Arena; Attendance: 3,903; Referee: Vasily Kazartsev

3 October 2021 10	Lokomotiv Moscow	1 – 2	Rostov	Moscow
19:00 MSK (UTC+3)	Maradishvili 9'; Pablo (yellow card) 72'	Report	Kerk 31' (o.g.); Almqvist (yellow card) 68'; Bayramyan (yellow card) 70'; Poloz 88'; Pesyakov (yellow card) 90+1'	Stadium: RZD Arena; Attendance: 4,472; Referee: Pavel Kukuyan

16 October 2021 11	Sochi	3 – 2	Rostov	Sochi
19:00 MSK (UTC+3)	Yusupov 10'; Noboa 28' (pen.); Burmistrov (yellow card) 32'; Cassierra 33'; Prokhin (yellow card) 82'	Report	Kalinin (yellow card) 6'; Bastos (yellow card) 23' (goal) 53'; Gigović (yellow card) 58'; Sowe 90+'	Stadium: Fisht Olympic Stadium; Attendance: 4,735; Referee: Evgeny Kukulyak

23 October 2021 12	Rostov	4 – 0	Arsenal Tula	Rostov-on-Don
16:30 MSK (UTC+3)	Hashimoto (yellow card) 26' (goal) 27'; Sowe 29'; Poloz 62' (pen.); Terentyev 64'; Sukhomlinov (yellow card) 72'; Bastos (yellow card) 87'	Report		Stadium: Rostov Arena; Attendance: 4,224; Referee: Kirill Levnikov

30 October 2021 13	Spartak Moscow	1 – 1	Rostov	Moscow
16:30 MSK (UTC+3)	Litvinov 78'; Bakayev (yellow card) 84'; Dzhikiya (yellow card) 87'; Sobolev (yellow card) 90'	Report	Glebov 90+'	Stadium: Otkritie Arena; Attendance: 6,199; Referee: Artyom Lyubimov

7 November 2021 14	Rostov	5 – 1	Rubin Kazan	Rostov-on-Don
16:30 MSK (UTC+3)	Bayramyan 42'; Poyarkov (yellow card) 43'; Poloz 50'; Almqvist 55'; Bastos (yellow card) 58'; Sowe 65'; Glebov 82'	Report	Bakayev (yellow card) 20' (goal) 35'; Uremović (yellow card) 56'; Kvaratskhelia (yellow card) 56'	Stadium: Rostov Arena; Attendance: 6,034; Referee: Pavel Shadykhanov

21 November 2021 15	Rostov	2 – 2	Ufa	Rostov-on-Don
14:00 MSK (UTC+3)	Poloz 21' (pen.); Hadžikadunić (yellow card) 55'; Bayramyan (yellow card) 55'; Almqvist 59'; Sukhomlinov (yellow card) 83'	Report	Botaka (yellow card) 13'; Agalarov 15', 57' (pen.); Mrzljak (yellow card) 25'	Stadium: Rostov Arena; Attendance: 4,989; Referee: Evgeny Kukulyak

27 November 2021 16	Akhmat Grozny	2 – 0	Rostov	Grozny
16:30 MSK (UTC+3)	Polyarus 26' (pen.); Shvets (yellow card) 45+'; Timofeyev (yellow card) 52'; Kharin (yellow card) 57'; Sebai 76'	Report	Glebov (yellow card) 41'; Shchetinin (yellow card) 78'	Stadium: Akhmat-Arena; Attendance: 5,557; Referee: Vladislav Bezborodov

3 December 2021 17	Zenit St.Petersburg	2 – 2	Rostov	Saint Petersburg
19:00 MSK (UTC+3)	Chistyakov (yellow card) 9'; Rakitskyi (yellow card) 27'; Claudinho 31', 69' (pen.) (yellow card) 78'; Yerokhin (yellow card) 42'; Sutormin (yellow card) 86'	Report	Poloz 11' (pen.); Komlichenko 25' (yellow card) 54'; Glebov (yellow card) 29'; Terentyev (yellow card) 60'; Kalinin (yellow card) 61'; Melyokhin (yellow card) 80'	Stadium: Krestovsky Stadium; Attendance: 19,890; Referee: Alexey Matyunin

11 December 2021 18	Rostov	1 – 4	Ural Yekaterinburg	Rostov-on-Don
19:00 MSK (UTC+3)	Bayramyan (yellow card) 9'; Poloz 19' (pen.); Osipenko (yellow card) 37'; Langovich (yellow card) 74'; Folmer (yellow card) 81'	Report	Gadzhimuradov 3', 39' (yellow card) 81'; Adamov 6'; Bicfalvi 43'; Yegorychev (yellow card) 56'	Stadium: Rostov Arena; Attendance: 5,255; Referee: Pavel Kukuyan

7 March 2022 20	Rostov	0 – 1	Sochi	Rostov-on-Don
16:30 MSK (UTC+3)	Silyanov (yellow card) 81'; Melyokhin (yellow card) 82'; Osipenko (yellow card) 90+1'; Pesyakov (yellow card) 90+8'	Report	Cassierra (yellow card) 13'; Melkadze (yellow card) 85'; Noboa 90+2' (pen.)	Stadium: Rostov Arena; Attendance: 14,564; Referee: Igor Panin

14 March 2022 21	Rubin Kazan	1 – 2	Rostov	Kazan
19:00 MSK (UTC+3)	Lisakovich (red card) 18'; Zuyev (yellow card) 54'; Kvaratskhelia 77' (yellow card) 90+'; Begić (yellow card) 80'	Report	Poloz 12'; Silyanov (yellow card) 57'; Begić 75' (o.g.); Golenkov (yellow card) 76'; Folmer (red card) 90+'	Stadium: Ak Bars Arena; Attendance: 3,344; Referee: Vitali Meshkov

20 March 2022 22	Dynamo Moscow	1 – 1	Rostov	Moscow
20:00 MSK (UTC+3)	Parshivlyuk (yellow card) 33'; Balbuena (yellow card) 80'; Smolov 90'	Report	Shchetinin (yellow card) 25'; Poloz 59'; Bayramyan (yellow card) 68'	Stadium: VTB Arena; Attendance: 14,127; Referee: Pavel Kukuyan

2 April 2022 23	Rostov	1 – 2	Nizhny Novgorod	Rostov-on-Don
16:30 MSK (UTC+3)	Poyarkov (yellow card) 9'; Shchetinin 25'; Tugarev (yellow card) 52'	Report	Ennin 7'; Stotsky 45+'; Miladinović (yellow card) 89'	Stadium: Rostov Arena; Attendance: 10,002; Referee: Kirill Levnikov

6 April 2022 19	Rostov	1 – 0	Krylia Sovetov	Rostov-on-Don
19:00 MSK (UTC+3)	Komlichenko 18' (yellow card) 44'; Poloz (penalty missed) 28'; Silyanov (yellow card) 51'; Langovich (yellow card) 55'; Pesyakov (yellow card) 90+'	Report	Lomayev (yellow card) 25'; Sarveli (yellow card) 29'; Yezhov (yellow card) 35'; Glushenkov (yellow card) 74'	Stadium: Rostov Arena; Attendance: 8,604; Referee: Vasily Kazartsev
Note: Match originally scheduled for 27 February, but postponed on 24 February. Match rearranged for 6 April on 16 March.

10 April 2022 24	Rostov	4 – 1	Lokomotiv Moscow	Rostov-on-Don
19:30 MSK (UTC+3)	Osipenko (yellow card) 31' (goal) 43'; Shchetinin 34'; Poloz 61'; Komlichenko 70' (pen.)	Report	Isidor (yellow card) 31' (goal) 81' (pen.); Tiknizyan (red card) 37'; Zhivoglyadov (yellow card) 66'; Barinov (yellow card) 83'	Stadium: Rostov Arena; Attendance: 15,075; Referee: Yan Bobrovsky

17 April 2022 25	Arsenal Tula	1 – 2	Rostov	Tula
14:00 MSK (UTC+3)	Kostadinov (yellow card) 16'; Stepanov (yellow card) 21'; Smolnikov (yellow card) 38' (goal) 44'; Belyayev (yellow card) 90+'; Markov (yellow card) 90+'	Report	Komlichenko 10'; Bayramyan (yellow card) 38'; Langovich (yellow card) 58'; Poloz 87'	Stadium: Arsenal Stadium; Attendance: 3,983; Referee: Evgeniy Kukulyak

24 April 2022 26	Rostov	3 – 2	Spartak Moscow	Rostov-on-Don
16:30 MSK (UTC+3)	Tugarev 14'; Shchetinin (yellow card) 20'; Bayramyan (yellow card) 66'; Poloz 75' (pen.); Sowe 90+'; Golenkov (yellow card) 90+'	Report	Sobolev 17' (yellow card) 45+'; Chernov (yellow card) 45+3'; Litvinov 90+'; Martins (yellow card) 90+'	Stadium: Rostov Arena; Attendance: 25,082; Referee: Vitali Meshkov

30 April 2022 27	Krasnodar	2 – 1	Rostov	Krasnodar
16:30 MSK (UTC+3)	Krivtsov 14'; Kalinin 15' (o.g.); Yakimov (yellow card) 83'; Samko (yellow card) 88'	Report	Komlichenko 4'; Tugarev (yellow card) 45+'; Selyava (yellow card) 49'	Stadium: Krasnodar Stadium; Attendance: 17,590; Referee: Vladislav Bezborodov

8 May 2022 28	Ufa	0 – 0	Rostov	Ufa
14:00 MSK (UTC+3)	Ivanov (yellow card) 15'; Jokić (yellow card) 81' (yellow-red card) 85'	Report	Poloz (penalty missed) 8'; Glebov (yellow card) 15'; Melyokhin (yellow card) 53'; Komlichenko (yellow card) 73'	Stadium: BetBoom Arena; Attendance: 7,277; Referee: Pavel Kukuyan

14 May 2022 29	Rostov	2 – 1	Khimki	Rostov-on-Don
16:30 MSK (UTC+3)	Tugarev 12'; Poloz 17'; Shchetinin (yellow card) 30'; Bayramyan (yellow card) 32'; Kalinin (yellow card) 43'; Langovich (yellow card) 49'	Report	Bozhenov (yellow card) 20'; Idowu (yellow card) 23'; Mirzov 90+'; Grigalava (yellow card) 90+'	Stadium: Rostov Arena; Attendance: 15,825; Referee: Vladislav Bezborodov

21 May 2022 30	CSKA Moscow	4 – 0	Rostov	Moscow
17:00 MSK (UTC+3)	Fernandes 4' (yellow card) 56'; Gbamin 10'; Oblyakov 52'; Diveyev 87'	Report		Stadium: VEB Arena; Attendance: 12,802; Referee: Yan Bobrovsky

=== Russian Cup ===
==== Round of 32 ====
Pos	Team	Pld	W	D	L	GF	GA	GD	Pts	Qualification
1	Chayka (Q)	2	2	0	0	2	0	+2	6	Advance to Play-off
2	Torpedo Moscow	2	1	0	1	2	1	+1	3	
3	Rostov	2	0	0	2	0	3	−3	0	

Rules for classification: 1) Points; 2) Wins; 3) Goal differential; 4) Goals scored; 5) Head-to-head result; 6) Disciplinary points.
(Q) Qualified for the phase indicated

22 September 2021 2	Chayka Peschanokopskoye	1 – 0	Rostov	Peschanokopskoye
19:30 MSK (UTC+3)	Oleynikov 22' (yellow card) 69'; Hawrylovich (yellow card) 48'; Sinyak (yellow card) 80'; Aliyev (yellow card) 90+2'	Report	Sowe (yellow card) 85'	Stadium: Chayka Central Stadium

27 October 2021 3	Torpedo Moscow	2 – 0	Rostov	Moscow
14:00 MSK (UTC+3)	Poluboyarinov (yellow card) 48'; Yeliseyev (yellow card) 51'; Kalmykov 60' (pen.); Abdrashitov 90+1'	Report	Mukhin (yellow card) 60'; Turishchev (red card) 61'; Melyokhin (yellow card) 82'	Stadium: Sportivnyy Gorodok Luzhniki; Referee: Yan Bobrovskiy

== Squad statistics ==
As of match played 21 May 2022

=== Appearances and goals ===
No.	Pos	Nat	Player	Total		Premier League		Russian Cup	
No.	Pos	Nat	Player	Apps	Goals	Apps	Goals	Apps	Goals
1	GK	(Russia) RUS	Yegor Baburin	5	0	3	0	2	0
4	DF	(Russia) RUS	Denis Terentyev	26	1	18+7	1	1	0
7	FW	(Russia) RUS	Dmitry Poloz	28	14	24+3	14	1	0
13	DF	(Russia) RUS	Ihor Kalinin	15	0	13+2	0	0	0
15	MF	(Russia) RUS	Danil Glebov	31	4	30	4	1	0
19	MF	(Armenia) ARM	Khoren Bayramyan	25	1	21+4	1	0	0
22	FW	(The Gambia) GAM	Ali Sowe	19	4	9+9	4	1	0
23	MF	(Russia) RUS	Roman Tugarev	14	2	11+2	2	1	0
25	MF	(Russia) RUS	Kirill Folmer	17	0	5+10	0	1+1	0
27	FW	(Russia) RUS	Nikolay Komlichenko	29	8	20+8	8	1	0
29	DF	(Russia) RUS	Aleksandr Mukhin	7	0	1+5	0	1	0
30	GK	(Russia) RUS	Sergei Pesyakov	27	0	27	0	0	0
38	MF	(Belarus) BLR	Aleksandr Selyava	7	0	1+6	0	0	0
42	DF	(Russia) RUS	Nikita Kotin	1	0	0	0	0+1	0
45	DF	(Russia) RUS	Aleksandr Silyanov	12	0	12	0	0	0
55	DF	(Russia) RUS	Maksim Osipenko	30	2	29	2	1	0
60	MF	(Armenia) ARM	Pavel Gorelov	1	0	0	0	1	0
62	MF	(Russia) RUS	Ivan Komarov	1	0	0	0	0+1	0
69	FW	(Russia) RUS	Yegor Golenkov	10	0	1+9	0	0	0
71	DF	(Russia) RUS	Nikolai Poyarkov	14	0	6+8	0	0	0
72	MF	(Russia) RUS	Daniil Nikolayev	1	0	0	0	1	0
75	FW	(Russia) RUS	Danil Khromov	1	0	0	0	0+1	0
76	FW	(Russia) RUS	Danila Sukhomlinov	22	0	5+16	0	0+1	0
77	MF	(Russia) RUS	Stepan Melnikov	6	0	0+6	0	0	0
87	DF	(Russia) RUS	Andrei Langovich	19	0	9+8	0	2	0
88	MF	(Russia) RUS	Kirill Shchetinin	12	2	9+2	2	1	0
89	FW	(Russia) RUS	Artyom Muamba	1	0	0+1	0	0	0
90	FW	(Russia) RUS	Maksim Turishchev	7	0	0+5	0	1+1	0
92	DF	(Russia) RUS	Viktor Melyokhin	18	0	14+3	0	1	0
97	MF	(Russia) RUS	Artyom Isik	2	0	0+1	0	1	0
Players who suspended their contracts:
8	MF	(Sweden) SWE	Armin Gigović	13	0	7+6	0	0	0
11	MF	(Sweden) SWE	Pontus Almqvist	19	2	15+3	2	1	0
16	DF	(Angola) ANG	Bastos	15	1	13+1	1	1	0
18	MF	(Japan) JPN	Kento Hashimoto	10	2	10	2	0	0
Players away from the club on loan:
5	DF	(Bosnia and Herzegovina) BIH	Dennis Hadžikadunić	11	0	9+1	0	1	0
14	MF	(Norway) NOR	Magnus Knudsen	1	0	1	0	0	0
17	MF	(Norway) NOR	Mathias Normann	4	0	4	0	0	0
Players who left Rostov during the season:
10	MF	(Russia) RUS	Pavel Mamayev	6	0	4+2	0	0	0

=== Goal scorers ===
Place	Position	Nation	Number	Name	Premier League	Russian Cup	Total
1	FW	(Russia)	7	Dmitry Poloz	14	0	14
2	FW	(Russia)	27	Nikolay Komlichenko	8	0	8
3	MF	(Russia)	15	Danil Glebov	4	0	4
3	FW	(The Gambia)	22	Ali Sowe	4	0	4
3				Own goal	4	0	4
6	MF	(Japan)	18	Kento Hashimoto	2	0	2
6	MF	(Sweden)	11	Pontus Almqvist	2	0	2
6	DF	(Russia)	55	Maksim Osipenko	2	0	2
6	MF	(Russia)	88	Kirill Shchetinin	2	0	2
6	MF	(Russia)	23	Roman Tugarev	2	0	2
11	DF	(Angola)	16	Bastos	1	0	1
11	DF	(Russia)	4	Denis Terentyev	1	0	1
11	MF	(Armenia)	19	Khoren Bayramyan	1	0	1
				TOTALS	47	0	47

=== Clean sheets ===
Place	Position	Nation	Number	Name	Premier League	Russian Cup	Total
1	GK	(Russia)	35	Sergei Pesyakov	2	0	2
2	GK	(Russia)	1	Yegor Baburin	1	0	1
				TOTALS	3	0	3

=== Disciplinary record ===
Number	Nation	Position	Name	Premier League		Russian Cup		Total	
Number	Nation	Position	Name	Yellow card	Red card	Yellow card	Red card	Yellow card	Red card
4	(Russia)	DF	Denis Terentyev	3	0	0	0	3	0
7	(Russia)	FW	Dmitry Poloz	1	0	0	0	1	0
13	(Russia)	DF	Ihor Kalinin	4	0	0	0	4	0
15	(Russia)	MF	Danil Glebov	3	0	0	0	3	0
19	(Armenia)	MF	Khoren Bayramyan	8	0	0	0	8	0
22	(The Gambia)	FW	Ali Sowe	1	0	1	0	2	0
23	(Russia)	MF	Roman Tugarev	2	0	0	0	2	0
25	(Russia)	MF	Kirill Folmer	1	1	0	0	1	1
27	(Russia)	FW	Nikolay Komlichenko	4	0	0	0	4	0
29	(Russia)	DF	Aleksandr Mukhin	0	0	1	0	1	0
30	(Russia)	GK	Sergei Pesyakov	3	0	0	0	3	0
38	(Belarus)	MF	Aleksandr Selyava	1	0	0	0	1	0
45	(Russia)	DF	Aleksandr Silyanov	3	0	0	0	3	0
55	(Russia)	DF	Maksim Osipenko	4	0	0	0	4	0
69	(Russia)	FW	Yegor Golenkov	2	0	0	0	2	0
71	(Russia)	DF	Nikolai Poyarkov	3	0	0	0	3	0
76	(Russia)	MF	Danila Sukhomlinov	4	0	0	0	4	0
87	(Russia)	DF	Andrei Langovich	5	0	0	0	5	0
88	(Russia)	MF	Kirill Shchetinin	4	0	0	0	4	0
90	(Russia)	FW	Maksim Turishchev	0	0	0	1	0	1
92	(Russia)	DF	Viktor Melyokhin	4	0	1	0	5	0
Players who suspended their contracts:
8	(Sweden)	MF	Armin Gigović	1	0	0	0	1	0
11	(Sweden)	MF	Pontus Almqvist	2	0	0	0	2	0
16	(Angola)	DF	Bastos	4	0	0	0	4	0
18	(Japan)	MF	Kento Hashimoto	1	0	0	0	1	0
Players away on loan:
5	(Bosnia and Herzegovina)	DF	Dennis Hadžikadunić	3	0	0	0	3	0
17	(Norway)	MF	Mathias Normann	1	0	0	0	1	0
Players who left Rostov during the season:
10	(Russia)	MF	Pavel Mamayev	1	0	0	0	1	0
			TOTALS	73	1	3	1	76	2
