= Daniil Nikolayev =

Daniil Nikolayev may refer to:

- Daniil Nikolayev (footballer, born 1991), Russian football player
- Daniil Nikolayev (footballer, born 2002), Russian football player
