= Andrius Rukas =

Russian footballer (born 1996)

Personal information
- Full name: Andrius Gintarasovich Rukas
- Date of birth: 4 September 1996 (age 30)
- Place of birth: Andrušaičiai, Lithuania
- Height: 1.86 m (6 ft 1 in)
- Position: Centre-back

Youth career
- Avtovo Saint Petersburg

Senior career*
Years	Team	Apps	(Gls)
2013–2014	FC Sibir-2 Novosibirsk	17	(0)
2014–2016	FC Dynamo Moscow	0	(0)
2016–2017	FC Arsenal Tula	0	(0)
2017–2018	União de Leiria	6	(0)
2018–2019	Peniche	7	(0)
2019–2020	União de Leiria	6	(0)
2020	FC Tom Tomsk	1	(0)
2020	FC Irtysh Omsk	19	(1)
2021–2023	FC Yenisey Krasnoyarsk	28	(1)
2021–2023	FC Yenisey-2 Krasnoyarsk	5	(0)
2023–2024	FC SKA-Khabarovsk	5	(0)
2024	FC Yenisey Krasnoyarsk	2	(0)
2024	FC Yenisey-2 Krasnoyarsk	3	(0)
2025	FC Shinnik Yaroslavl	8	(0)

International career^{‡}
2014	Russia U18	4	(1)
- * Club domestic league appearances and goals as of 28 November 2025 ‡ National team caps and goals as of 12 January 2014

Andrius Gintarasovich Rukas (Russian: Андрюс Гинтарасович Рукас; born 4 September 1996) is a football player. Born in Lithuania, he has represented Russia at youth level.

== Club career ==
He made his debut in the Russian Football National League for FC Tom Tomsk on 9 March 2020 in a game against FC Khimki. He started the game and played the full match.

== Personal life ==
His twin brother Tomas Rukas is also a footballer.
