= Artyom Ntumba =

Russian footballer (born 2003)

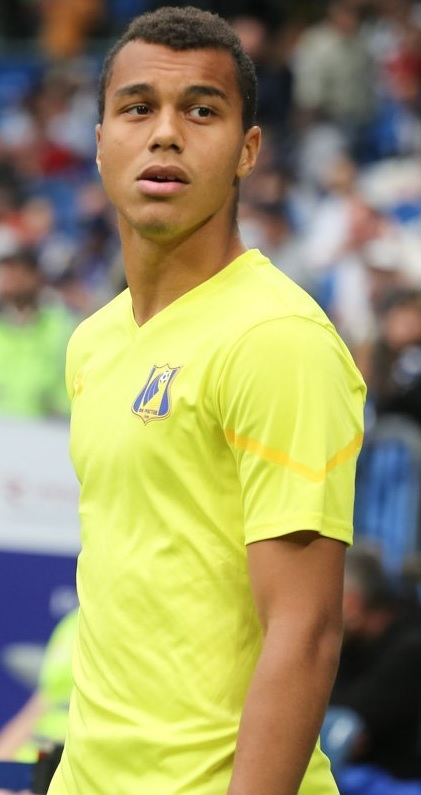
- Ntumba with Rostov in 2022

Personal information
- Full name: Artyom Ntumba Muamba
- Date of birth: 19 April 2003 (age 23)
- Place of birth: Moscow, Russia
- Height: 1.85 m (6 ft 1 in)
- Position: Forward

Youth career
- –2015: DYuSSh Sportivno-Adaptivnaya Shkola Moscow
- 2015–2017: Lokomotiv Moscow
- 2017–2020: CSKA Moscow
- 2020: Ural Yekaterinburg
- 2021–2023: Rostov

Senior career*
| Years | Team | Apps | (Gls) |
| 2022–2023 | Rostov | 8 | (0) |
| 2023 | → Veles Moscow (loan) | 1 | (0) |
| 2024–2026 | 2DROTS Moscow | | |
| 2026 | Metallurg Lipetsk | 8 | (1) |
| 2026 | Rubin Yalta | 1 | (0) |
- * Club domestic league appearances and goals as of 15 August 2026

Artyom Ntumba Muamba (Russian: Артём Нтумба Муамба; born 19 April 2003) is a Russian football player of Congolese descent.

== Club career ==
He made his debut in the Russian Premier League for Rostov on 21 May 2022 in a game against CSKA Moscow.

In May 2023, Ntumba suffered an ACL tear while playing for a media football team 2DROTS Moscow, while under contract with Rostov and on loan at Veles Moscow. The sporting director of Rostov Aleksei Ryskin and owner of Veles Yevgeni Shilenkov both said that he was not given permission by either club to play in that game. Ryskin said that his contract status will be clarified later.

== Career statistics ==
As of 27 November 2022

| Club | Season | League | | | Cup | | Continental | | Total | |
| Club | Season | Division | Apps | Goals | Apps | Goals | Apps | Goals | Apps | Goals |
|---|---|---|---|---|---|---|---|---|---|---|
| Rostov | 2021–22 | RPL | 1 | 0 | – | | – | | 1 | 0 |
| Rostov | 2022–23 | RPL | 7 | 0 | 0 | 0 | – | | 7 | 0 |
| Career total | | | 8 | 0 | 0 | 0 | 0 | 0 | 8 | 0 |
