= Vadim Lukyanov =

Russian footballer (born 2002)

Personal information
- Full name: Vadim Olegovich Lukyanov
- Date of birth: 16 December 2002 (age 23)
- Place of birth: Krasnodar, Russia
- Height: 1.94 m (6 ft 4 in)
- Position: Goalkeeper

Team information
- Current team: Kattaqo'rg'on FK
- Number: 1

Youth career
- –2019: Urozhay Krasnodar
- 2019: SSh Krasnodar
- 2020–2021: Rostov

Senior career*
Years	Team	Apps	(Gls)
2021–2022	Rostov	0	(0)
2021–2022	→ Volga Ulyanovsk (loan)	2	(0)
2022–2023	Kuban-Holding Pavlovskaya	20	(0)
2023–2024	Forte Taganrog	14	(0)
2024–2026	Pari Nizhny Novgorod	3	(0)
2024	→ Pari NN-2 Nizhny Novgorod	1	(0)
- * Club domestic league appearances and goals as of 25 July 2025

Vadim Olegovich Lukyanov (Russian: Вадим Олегович Лукьянов; born 16 December 2002) is a Russian football player who plays as a goalkeeper.

== Career ==
Lukyanov began his senior career with Rostov, but did not make his debut there, playing for the Under-19 squad and remaining on the bench with the senior squad.

In February 2024, he joined Russian Premier League club Pari Nizhny Novgorod on a two-and-a-half year contract. Lukyanov made his RPL debut for Pari Nizhny Novgorod on 12 April 2025 in a game against Dynamo Moscow.

== Career statistics ==
As of 1 October 2025

Club	Season	League			Cup		Other		Total	
Club	Season	Division	Apps	Goals	Apps	Goals	Apps	Goals	Apps	Goals
Rostov	2019–20	Russian Premier League	0	0	–		–		0	0
Rostov	2020–21	Russian Premier League	0	0	–		–		0	0
Rostov	2021–22	Russian Premier League	0	0	–		–		0	0
Rostov	Total		0	0	0	0	0	0	0	0
Volga Ulyanovsk (loan)	2021–22	Russian Second League	2	0	–		–		2	0
Kuban-Holding Pavlovskaya	2022–23	Russian Second League	20	0	0	0	–		20	0
Forte Taganrog	2023–24	Russian Second League Division A	14	0	1	0	–		15	0
Pari Nizhny Novgorod	2023–24	Russian Premier League	0	0	–		0	0	0	0
Pari Nizhny Novgorod	2024–25	Russian Premier League	2	0	5	0	–		7	0
Pari Nizhny Novgorod	2025–26	Russian Premier League	1	0	4	0	–		5	0
Pari Nizhny Novgorod	Total		3	0	9	0	0	0	12	0
Pari NN-2 Nizhny Novgorod	2024	Russian Second League Division B	1	0	–		–		1	0
Career total			40	0	10	0	0	0	50	0
