= Nikita Kupriyanov =

Russian footballer

Personal information
- Full name: Nikita Yevgenyevich Kupriyanov
- Date of birth: 23 April 2002 (age 24)
- Height: 1.76 m (5 ft 9 in)
- Position: Midfielder

Team information
- Current team: Saturn Ramenskoye
- Number: 74

Senior career*
Years	Team	Apps	(Gls)
2018–2019	Kalitva Belaya Kalitva		
2019–2022	Rostov	1	(0)
2021–2022	→ SKA Rostov-on-Don (loan)	11	(0)
2022–2023	Kuban-Holding	9	(1)
2023	Peresvet Domodedovo	11	(5)
2023–2024	Avangard Kursk	32	(2)
2024–2025	Rostov-2	47	(3)
2026	Pobeda Nizhny Novgorod	0	(0)
2026–	Saturn Ramenskoye	12	(1)
- * Club domestic league appearances and goals as of 31 October 2026

Nikita Yevgenyevich Kupriyanov (Russian: Никита Евгеньевич Куприянов; born 23 April 2002) is a Russian football player who plays for Saturn Ramenskoye.

== Club career ==
Kupriyanov made his debut in the Russian Premier League for Rostov on 19 June 2020 in a game against Sochi as a team captain. Rostov was forced to field their Under-18 squad in that game as their main squad was quarantined after 6 players tested positive for COVID-19.
