= Danil Khromov =

Russian footballer

Personal information
- Full name: Danil Dmitriyevich Khromov
- Date of birth: 25 December 2002 (age 23)
- Height: 1.75 m (5 ft 9 in)
- Position: Forward

Youth career
- Rostov

Senior career*
Years	Team	Apps	(Gls)
2019–2024	Rostov	1	(0)
2022–2023	→ Arsenal Tula (loan)	9	(0)
2022–2023	→ Arsenal-2 Tula (loan)	7	(0)
2024–2025	Rostov-2	16	(1)
2025–2026	Dynamo Stavropol	22	(1)
- * Club domestic league appearances and goals as of 14 June 2026

Danil Dmitriyevich Khromov (Russian: Данил Дмитриевич Хромов; born 25 December 2002) is a Russian football player.

== Club career ==
He made his debut in the Russian Premier League for Rostov on 19 June 2020 in a game against Sochi. FC Rostov was forced to field their Under-18 squad in that game as their main squad was quarantined after 6 players tested positive for COVID-19.

On 29 June 2022, Khromov extended his contract with Rostov for three more years and was loaned to Arsenal Tula.

== Career statistics ==
As of 25 May 2024

Club	Season	League			Cup		Continental		Total	
Club	Season	Division	Apps	Goals	Apps	Goals	Apps	Goals	Apps	Goals
Rostov	2019–20	Russian Premier League	1	0	–		–		1	0
Rostov	2021–22	Russian Premier League	0	0	1	0	–		1	0
Rostov	2023–24	Russian Premier League	0	0	0	0	–		0	0
Rostov	Total		1	0	1	0	0	0	2	0
Arsenal Tula (loan)	2022–23	Russian First League	9	0	0	0	–		9	0
Arsenal-2 Tula (loan)	2022–23	Russian Second League	7	0	0	0	–		7	0
Career total			17	0	1	0	0	0	18	0
