= Daniil Nikolayev (footballer, born 2002) =

Russian footballer

Personal information
- Full name: Daniil Nikolayevich Nikolayev
- Date of birth: 10 May 2002 (age 24)
- Height: 1.83 m (6 ft 0 in)
- Position: Midfielder

Team information
- Current team: FC Saturn Ramenskoye
- Number: 2

Youth career
- –2020: FC Zenit Saint Petersburg
- 2020–2022: FC Rostov

Senior career*
Years	Team	Apps	(Gls)
2021–2022	FC Rostov	0	(0)
2022	FC Kuban-Holding Pavlovskaya	3	(0)
2023	FC Druzhba Maykop	12	(0)
2023–2024	FC Leon Saturn Ramenskoye	42	(2)
2025	FC Dynamo Saint Petersburg	4	(0)
2025	SShOR-1 Kristall St. Petersburg		
2026	RW Challenge St. Petersburg		
2026–	FC Saturn Ramenskoye	13	(2)
- * Club domestic league appearances and goals as of 31 October 2026

Daniil Nikolayevich Nikolayev (Russian: Даниил Николаевич Николаев; born 10 May 2002) is a Russian football player who plays for FC Saturn Ramenskoye.

== Club career ==
He made his debut for the main squad of FC Rostov on 27 October 2021 in a Russian Cup game against FC Torpedo Moscow.

== Career statistics ==
As of 21 May 2022

Club	Season	League			Cup		Continental		Total	
Club	Season	Division	Apps	Goals	Apps	Goals	Apps	Goals	Apps	Goals
Rostov	2021–22	RPL	0	0	1	0	–		1	0
Career total			0	0	1	0	0	0	1	0
