= Damir Shaykhtdinov =

Russian footballer (born 2003)

Personal information
- Full name: Damir Rinatovich Shaykhtdinov
- Date of birth: 20 November 2003 (age 22)
- Place of birth: Ozyory, Russia
- Height: 1.80 m (5 ft 11 in)
- Position: Defender

Team information
- Current team: Gomel
- Number: 43

Youth career
- Spartak Moscow

Senior career*
Years	Team	Apps	(Gls)
2021–2022	Spartak-2 Moscow	8	(0)
2022	Spartak Moscow	0	(0)
2022–2024	Zenit-2 St. Petersburg	21	(0)
2023–2024	→ Volgar Astrakhan (loan)	18	(0)
2024	Rodina Moscow	6	(0)
2024	Rodina-2 Moscow	0	(0)
2025	Mashuk-KMV Pyatigorsk	11	(0)
2025	Sokol Saratov	10	(0)
2026–	Gomel	12	(0)

International career^{‡}
2018	Russia U-15	7	(0)
2018–2019	Russia U-16	11	(0)
2019–2020	Russia U-17	6	(0)
2021	Russia U-18	4	(0)
2021	Russia U-19	7	(0)
- * Club domestic league appearances and goals as of 6 July 2026 ‡ National team caps and goals as of 13 November 2021

Damir Rinatovich Shaykhtdinov (Russian: Дамир Ринатович Шайхтдинов; born 20 November 2003) is a Russian football player who plays for Gomel.

== Club career ==
Shaykhtdinov made his debut in the Russian Football National League for Spartak-2 Moscow on 8 August 2021 in a game against Veles Moscow.

On 23 August 2022 he signed a two-year contract with Zenit St. Petersburg. In the 2022–23 season, he played for the reserve team Zenit-2 St. Petersburg.

On 28 June 2023, Shaykhtdinov joined Volgar Astrakhan on loan.
