= Artyom Isik =

Russian footballer (born 2002)

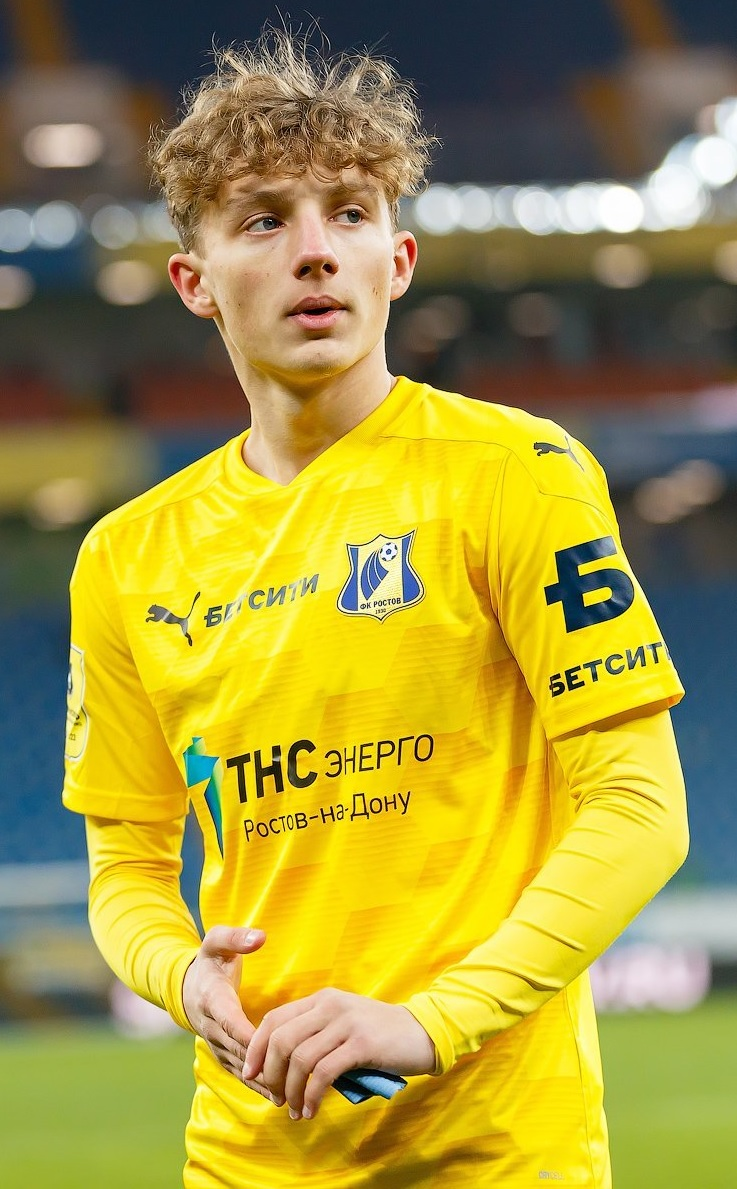
- Isik with FC Rostov in 2021

Personal information
- Full name: Artyom Sergeyevich Isik
- Date of birth: 28 April 2002 (age 24)
- Place of birth: Neman, Russia
- Height: 1.83 m (6 ft 0 in)
- Position: Midfielder

Team information
- Current team: Dynamo Vologda
- Number: 39

Youth career
- –2020: Zenit St. Petersburg
- 2020–2022: Rostov

Senior career*
Years	Team	Apps	(Gls)
2021–2022	Rostov	1	(0)
2022–2024	Dynamo Stavropol	33	(1)
2022	→ KAMAZ Naberezhnye Chelny (loan)	10	(0)
2024–2026	Baltika-2 Kaliningrad	50	(2)
2024–2025	Baltika Kaliningrad	0	(0)
2026–	Dynamo Vologda	12	(0)
- * Club domestic league appearances and goals as of 1 November 2026

Artyom Sergeyevich Isik (Russian: Артём Сергеевич Исик; born 28 April 2002) is a Russian football player who plays for Dynamo Vologda.

== Club career ==
He made his debut for the main squad of Rostov on 27 October 2021 in a Russian Cup game against Torpedo Moscow. He made his Russian Premier League debut for Rostov on 11 December 2021 against Ural Yekaterinburg.

== Career statistics ==
As of 25 May 2025

Club	Season	League			Cup		Continental		Total	
Club	Season	Division	Apps	Goals	Apps	Goals	Apps	Goals	Apps	Goals
Rostov	2021–22	Russian Premier League	1	0	1	0	–		2	0
Dynamo Stavropol	2022–23	Russian Second League	14	0	2	1	–		16	1
Dynamo Stavropol	2023	Russian Second League B	19	1	2	0	–		21	1
Dynamo Stavropol	Total		33	1	4	1	0	0	37	2
KAMAZ (loan)	2022–23	Russian First League	10	0	1	0	–		11	0
Baltika-2 Kaliningrad	2024	Russian Second League B	28	1	–		–		28	1
Baltika-2 Kaliningrad	2025	Russian Second League B	8	0	–		–		8	0
Baltika-2 Kaliningrad	Total		36	1	0	0	0	0	36	1
Baltika Kaliningrad	2024–25	Russian First League	0	0	0	0	–		0	0
Career total			80	2	6	1	0	0	86	3
