= Danila Sukhomlinov =

Russian footballer (born 2002)

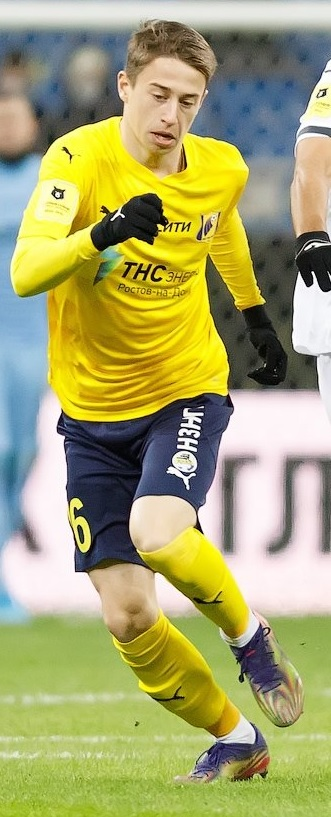
- Sukhomlinov with FC Rostov in 2020

Personal information
- Full name: Danila Andreyevich Sukhomlinov
- Date of birth: 31 August 2002 (age 24)
- Place of birth: Voronezh, Russia
- Height: 1.83 m (6 ft 0 in)
- Position: Attacking midfielder

Team information
- Current team: Neftekhimik Nizhnekamsk
- Number: 8

Youth career
- –2016: Fakel Voronezh
- 2016–2018: Energomash Belgorod
- 2019–2020: Master-Saturn Yegoryevsk

Senior career*
Years	Team	Apps	(Gls)
2020–2025	Rostov	24	(0)
2022	→ SKA-Khabarovsk (loan)	4	(0)
2023–2025	→ Shinnik Yaroslavl (loan)	50	(2)
2025–	Neftekhimik Nizhnekamsk	21	(0)
- * Club domestic league appearances and goals as of 16 May 2026

Danila Andreyevich Sukhomlinov (Russian: Данила Андреевич Сухомлинов; born 31 August 2002) is a Russian football player who plays as an attacking midfielder for Neftekhimik Nizhnekamsk.

== Club career ==
He made his debut in the Russian Premier League for Rostov on 8 November 2020 in a game against CSKA Moscow.

On 18 June 2022, Sukhomlinov was loaned to SKA-Khabarovsk for the 2022–23 season.

== Career statistics ==
As of match played 30 August 2023

Appearances and goals by club, season and competition
Club	Season	League			Cup		Continental		Other		Total	
Club	Season	Division	Apps	Goals	Apps	Goals	Apps	Goals	Apps	Goals	Apps	Goals
Rostov	2020–21	Russian Premier League	3	0	0	0	0	0	–		3	0
Rostov	2021–22	Russian Premier League	21	0	1	0	–		–		22	0
Rostov	2021–22	Russian Premier League	0	0	0	0	–		–		0	0
Rostov	2023–24	Russian Premier League	0	0	2	0	–		–		2	0
Rostov	Total		24	0	3	0	–		–		27	0
SKA-Khabarovsk (loan)	2022–23	Russian First League	4	0	1	0	–		–		5	0
Career total			28	0	4	0	0	0	0	0	32	0
