= Igor Kalinin =

Ukrainian-born Russian footballer

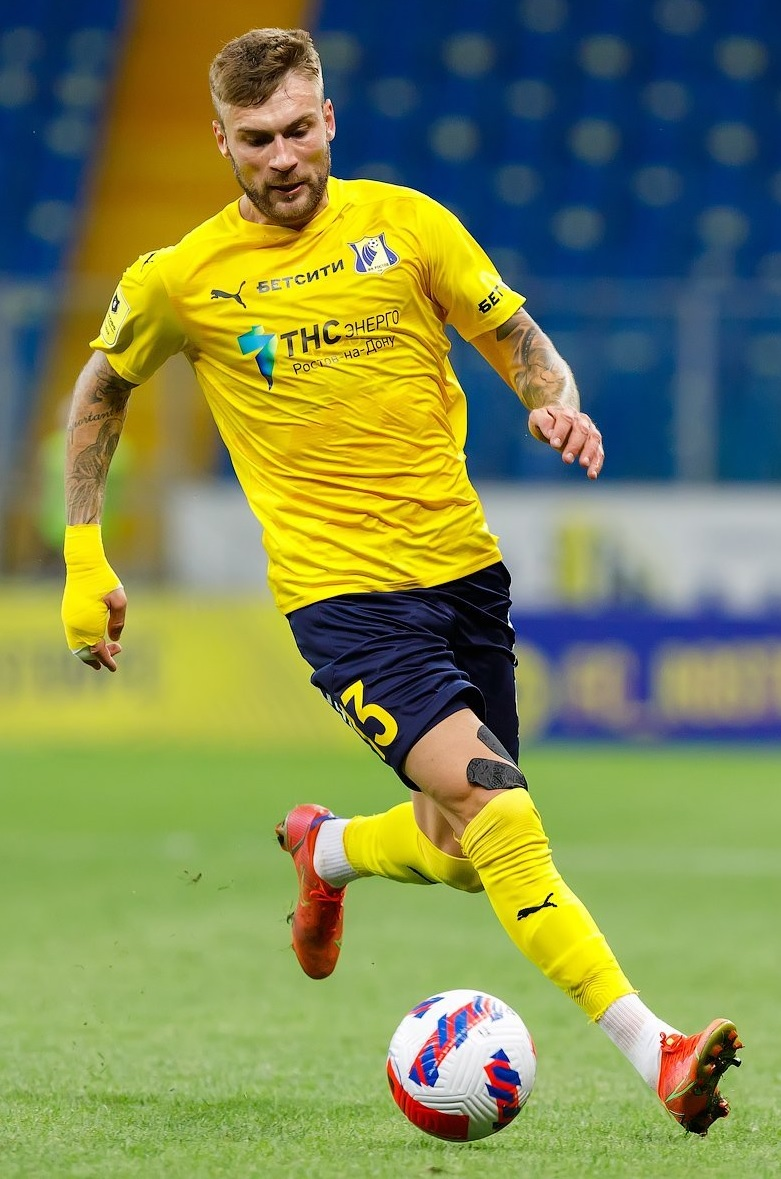
- Kalinin with Rostov in 2021

Personal information
- Full name: Igor Olegovich Kalinin
- Date of birth: 11 November 1995 (age 31)
- Place of birth: Kerch, AR Crimea, Ukraine
- Height: 1.85 m (6 ft 1 in)
- Position: Left-back

Team information
- Current team: Sochi
- Number: 13

Youth career
- 2008–2011: Sports School #5 Sevastopol
- 2011–2012: Illichivets Mariupol

Senior career*
Years	Team	Apps	(Gls)
2012–2014	Illichivets Mariupol	4	(0)
2015	Zorya Luhansk	1	(0)
2016	Zirka Kropyvnytskyi	5	(0)
2017	Volgar Astrakhan	35	(2)
2018	Krasnodar	2	(0)
2018	Krasnodar-2	1	(0)
2018–2019	Rubin Kazan	6	(1)
2019–2021	Dynamo Moscow	0	(0)
2020–2021	→ Ural Yekaterinburg (loan)	28	(1)
2021	Ural Yekaterinburg	0	(0)
2021–2025	Rostov	15	(0)
2022–2025	→ Fakel Voronezh (loan)	53	(0)
2025–2026	Panserraikos	23	(0)
2026–	Sochi	0	(0)

International career^{‡}
2012–2013	Ukraine U18	6	(1)
2013	Ukraine U19	5	(0)
- * Club domestic league appearances and goals as of 14 June 2026 ‡ National team caps and goals as of 23 October 2016

Igor Olegovich Kalinin (Russian: Игорь Олегович Калинин; born 11 November 1995) is a Ukrainian professional footballer who plays as a left-back for Sochi.

== Career ==
He is product of Sports School #5 Sevastopol and Illichivets Mariupol sports schools.

In 2014, after the annexation of Kerch, Crimea, by Russia, which is home to the player, Kalinin received a Russian passport.

He made his début for Illichivets Mariupol in game against Sevastopol in the Ukrainian Premier League on 27 April 2014 .

From January 2015, he was part of Zorya Luhansk in the Ukrainian Premier League. In December 2015, he left the club after the results of the investigation in which he was identified as the organizer of events to manipulate the results of the youth team matches.

On 2 February 2018, he signed a 4.5-year contract with Krasnodar. On 3 August 2018, he was released from his Krasnodar contract by mutual consent.

On 20 September 2018, he signed a 3-year contract with Rubin Kazan.

On 14 June 2019, he signed a 3-year contract with Dynamo Moscow. He made only one appearance in the Russian Cup in the first half of the 2019–20 season. In February 2020, he started the 2020 edition of the FNL Cup representing Tambov, and then on 21 February 2020 he joined Ural Yekaterinburg on loan with an option to purchase (finishing the FNL Cup with Ural). The loan was extended on 28 July 2020. At the end of the 2020–21 season, the purchase obligation was triggered in the loan contract, and Ural acquired his rights.

On 12 June 2021, he signed a 5-year contract with Rostov. On 8 September 2022, Kalinin joined Fakel Voronezh on loan until the end of the season. On 27 June 2023, the loan was extended for one more season. On 12 July 2024, the loan was extended once again.

== Career statistics ==
As of match played 31 May 2026

Appearances and goals by club, season and competition
Club	Season	League			Cup		Europe		Other		Total	
Club	Season	Division	Apps	Goals	Apps	Goals	Apps	Goals	Apps	Goals	Apps	Goals
Illichivets Mariupol	2013–14	Ukrainian Premier League	1	0	—		—		—		1	0
Illichivets Mariupol	2014–15	Ukrainian Premier League	3	0	1	0	—		—		4	0
Illichivets Mariupol	Total		4	0	1	0	—		—		5	0
Zorya Luhansk	2014–15	Ukrainian Premier League	0	0	0	0	—		—		0	0
Zorya Luhansk	2015–16	Ukrainian Premier League	1	0	0	0	0	0	—		1	0
Zorya Luhansk	Total		1	0	0	0	0	0	—		1	0
Zirka Kropyvnytskyi	2016–17	Ukrainian Premier League	5	0	—		—		—		5	0
Volgar Astrakhan	2016–17	Russian First League	11	0	—		—		4 (Note: Appearances in the FNL Cup)	1	15	1
Volgar Astrakhan	2017–18	Russian First League	24	2	0	0	—		—		24	2
Volgar Astrakhan	Total		35	2	0	0	0	0	4	1	39	3
Krasnodar	2017–18	Russian Premier League	2	0	—		—		—		2	0
Krasnodar	2018–19	Russian Premier League	0	0	—		—		—		0	0
Krasnodar	Total		2	0	0	0	0	0	0	0	2	0
Krasnodar-2	2017–18	FNL 2	1	0	—		—		—		1	0
Rubin Kazan	2018–19	Russian Premier League	6	1	2	0	—		—		8	1
Dynamo Moscow	2019–20	Russian Premier League	0	0	1	0	—		—		1	0
Tambov (loan)	2019–20	Russian Premier League	—		—		—		2	0	2	0
Ural Yekaterinburg (loan)	2019–20	Russian Premier League	6	0	2	0	—		2	0	10	0
Ural Yekaterinburg (loan)	2020–21	Russian Premier League	22	1	2	0	—		—		24	1
Ural Yekaterinburg (loan)	Total		28	1	4	0	0	0	2	0	34	1
Rostov	2021–22	Russian Premier League	15	0	0	0	—		—		15	0
Fakel Voronezh (loan)	2022–23	Russian Premier League	15	0	5	0	—		2 (Note: Appearances in playoffs)	0	22	0
Fakel Voronezh (loan)	2023–24	Russian Premier League	15	0	2	0	—		—		17	0
Fakel Voronezh (loan)	2024–25	Russian Premier League	23	0	1	0	—		—		24	0
Fakel Voronezh (loan)	Total		53	0	8	0	—		2	0	63	0
Panserraikos	2025–26	Super League Greece	23	0	0	0	—		—		23	0
Career total			173	4	16	0	0	0	10	1	199	5
