= Danila Vedernikov =

Russian footballer (born 2001)

Personal information
- Full name: Danila Vladimirovich Vedernikov
- Date of birth: 6 June 2001 (age 25)
- Place of birth: Astrakhan, Russia
- Height: 1.76 m (5 ft 9 in)
- Position: Left-back

Team information
- Current team: Orenburg
- Number: 3

Youth career
- Volgar Astrakhan
- 2018–2019: Krasnodar

Senior career*
Years	Team	Apps	(Gls)
2018	Krasnodar-2	1	(0)
2018–2019	Krasnodar-3	2	(0)
2019–2023	Rostov	5	(0)
2020–2021	→ Volgar Astrakhan (loan)	47	(0)
2022	→ Kuban Krasnodar (loan)	4	(0)
2022–2023	→ Volgar Astrakhan (loan)	31	(0)
2023–2025	Pari NN	6	(0)
2023–2024	→ Murom (loan)	9	(0)
2024	→ Pari NN-2	3	(0)
2025	Astrakhan	11	(1)
2025–	Orenburg	29	(1)

International career^{‡}
2018–2019	Russia U-18	10	(0)
- * Club domestic league appearances and goals as of 8 November 2026 ‡ National team caps and goals as of 24 March 2019

Danila Vladimirovich Vedernikov (Russian: Данила Владимирович Ведерников; born 6 June 2001) is a Russian football player who plays as a left-back for Orenburg.

== Club career ==
Vedernikov made his debut in the Russian Professional Football League for Krasnodar-2 on 17 March 2018 in a game against Biolog-Novokubansk.

He made his Russian Premier League debut for Rostov on 21 September 2019 in a game against Tambov, substituting Khoren Bayramyan in the 88th minute.

On 3 July 2021, Vedernikov returned to Volgar Astrakhan on loan for another season. On 21 January 2022, Rostov terminated the loan early. On 28 January 2022, he was loaned to Kuban Krasnodar. On 11 June 2022, Vedernikov returned to Volgar Astrakhan on a new loan.

On 11 July 2025, Vedernikov signed with Orenburg.

== Career statistics ==
As of match played 8 November 2026

Appearances and goals by club, season and competition
Club	Season	League			Cup		Other		Total	
Club	Season	Division	Apps	Goals	Apps	Goals	Apps	Goals	Apps	Goals
Krasnodar-2	2017–18	Russian Second League	1	0	—		—		1	0
Krasnodar-3	2018–19	Russian Second League	2	0	—		—		2	0
Rostov	2019–20	Russian Premier League	5	0	2	0	—		7	0
Volgar Astrakhan (loan)	2020–21	Russian First League	28	0	1	0	—		29	0
Volgar Astrakhan (loan)	2021–22	Russian First League	19	0	1	0	—		20	0
Volgar Astrakhan (loan)	Total		47	0	2	0	0	0	49	0
Kuban Krasnodar (loan)	2021–22	Russian First League	4	0	1	0	—		5	0
Volgar Astrakhan (loan)	2022–23	Russian First League	31	0	1	0	—		32	0
Murom (loan)	2023–24	Russian Second League A	9	0	—		—		9	0
Pari NN-2	2024	Russian Second League B	3	0	—		—		3	0
Pari NN	2023–24	Russian Premier League	1	0	—		0	0	1	0
Pari NN	2024–25	Russian Premier League	5	0	6	0	—		11	0
Pari NN	Total		6	0	6	0	0	0	12	0
Astrakhan	2025	Russian Second League B	11	1	0	0	—		11	1
Orenburg	2025–26	Russian Premier League	22	1	3	0	—		25	1
Orenburg	2026–27	Russian Premier League	7	0	4	0	—		11	0
Orenburg	Total		29	1	7	0	0	0	36	1
Career total			148	2	19	0	0	0	167	2
