= Nikita Kolotiyevsky =

Russian footballer

Personal information
- Full name: Nikita Olegovich Kolotiyevsky
- Date of birth: 4 March 2001 (age 25)
- Place of birth: Orlovsky, Russia
- Height: 1.82 m (6 ft 0 in)
- Position: Midfielder

Youth career
- –2016: FC Akademiya Futbola Rostov-on-Don
- 2016–2017: UOR #5 Yegoryevsk
- 2017: FC Rostov

Senior career*
Years	Team	Apps	(Gls)
2018–2023	FC Rostov	1	(0)
2021	→ FC Olimp-Dolgoprudny-2 (loan)	12	(0)
2022	→ FC Torpedo Miass (loan)	3	(0)

International career^{‡}
2018	Russia U17	3	(0)
- * Club domestic league appearances and goals as of 4 June 2022 ‡ National team caps and goals as of 28 January 2018

Nikita Olegovich Kolotiyevsky (Russian: Никита Олегович Колотиевский; born 4 March 2001) is a Russian football player.

== Club career ==
He made his debut in the Russian Premier League for FC Rostov on 19 June 2020 in a game against PFC Sochi. FC Rostov was forced to field their Under-18 squad in that game as their main squad was quarantined after 6 players tested positive for COVID-19.

On 9 July 2021, he joined FC Olimp-Dolgoprudny-2 on loan.
