= Sergey Kochkanyan =

Armenian footballer

Personal information
- Full name: Sergey Levonovich Kochkanyan
- Date of birth: 5 May 2003 (age 23)
- Place of birth: Sochi, Russia
- Height: 1.82 m (5 ft 11 1/2 in)
- Position: Defender

Youth career
- –2018: Kuban Krasnodar
- 2018–2022: Rostov

Senior career*
Years	Team	Apps	(Gls)
2020–2022	Rostov	1	(0)
2022–2023	Dynamo Stavropol	27	(5)
2023–2024	Baltika-BFU Kaliningrad	14	(1)
2024	Dynamo Stavropol	13	(0)
2025	Forte Taganrog	8	(0)

International career^{‡}
2021	Armenia U21	3	(0)
- * Club domestic league appearances and goals as of 15 June 2025 ‡ National team caps and goals as of 12 October 2021

Sergey Levonovich Kochkanyan (Russian: Сергей Левонович Кочканян; born 5 May 2003) is an Armenian footballer who plays as a defender. Born in Russia, he played for the Armenia U21s.

== Club career ==
He made his debut in the Russian Premier League for FC Rostov on 19 June 2020 in a game against PFC Sochi. FC Rostov was forced to field their under-18 squad in that game, as their main squad was quarantined after six players tested positive for COVID-19.
