= Tomas Rukas =

Lithuanian-Russian footballer

Personal information
- Full name: Tomas Gintarasovich Rukas
- Date of birth: 4 September 1996 (age 30)
- Place of birth: Andrušaičiai, Lithuania
- Height: 1.94 m (6 ft 4 in)
- Position: Centre back

Team information
- Current team: Tyumen
- Number: 96

Youth career
- –2011: Avtovo Saint Petersburg
- 2011–2012: DYuSSh Smena-Zenit
- 2012–2013: Avtovo Saint Petersburg
- 2014–2015: Lokomotiv Moscow

Senior career*
| Years | Team | Apps | (Gls) |
| 2013–2014 | Sibir-2 Novosibirsk | 11 | (0) |
| 2015–2017 | União de Leiria | 26 | (0) |
| 2015–2016 | → Getafe B (loan) | 9 | (0) |
| 2016 | → Sporting CP B (loan) | 8 | (0) |
| 2017–2020 | Zenit-2 St. Petersburg | 54 | (0) |
| 2020 | Yenisey Krasnoyarsk | 17 | (0) |
| 2021–2022 | Rostov | 0 | (0) |
| 2021–2022 | → Yenisey Krasnoyarsk (loan) | 10 | (0) |
| 2022–2024 | SKA-Khabarovsk | 46 | (1) |
| 2024–2025 | Yenisey Krasnoyarsk | 21 | (0) |
| 2026– | Tyumen | 16 | (0) |

International career
| 2012 | Lithuania U17 | 1 | (0) |
- * Club domestic league appearances and goals as of 17 October 2026

Tomas Gintarasovich Rukas (Russian: Томас Гинтарасович Рукас; born 4 September 1996) is a Russian-Lithuanian football player who plays for Tyumen.

== Club career ==
Rukas made his professional debut in the Russian Professional Football League for Sibir-2 Novosibirsk on 5 September 2013 in a game against Sakhalin Yuzhno-Sakhalinsk.

On 20 July 2017, he signed a 4-year contract with Zenit St. Petersburg. He made his Russian Football National League debut for Zenit-2 St. Petersburg on 26 July 2017 in a game against Sibir Novosibirsk.

On 29 January 2021, Rukas signed with Russian Premier League club Rostov. On 19 August 2021, he returned to Yenisey Krasnoyarsk on loan with an option to buy.

== Personal life ==
He is a twin brother of Andrius Rukas.
