= Konstantin Kovalyov =

Russian footballer

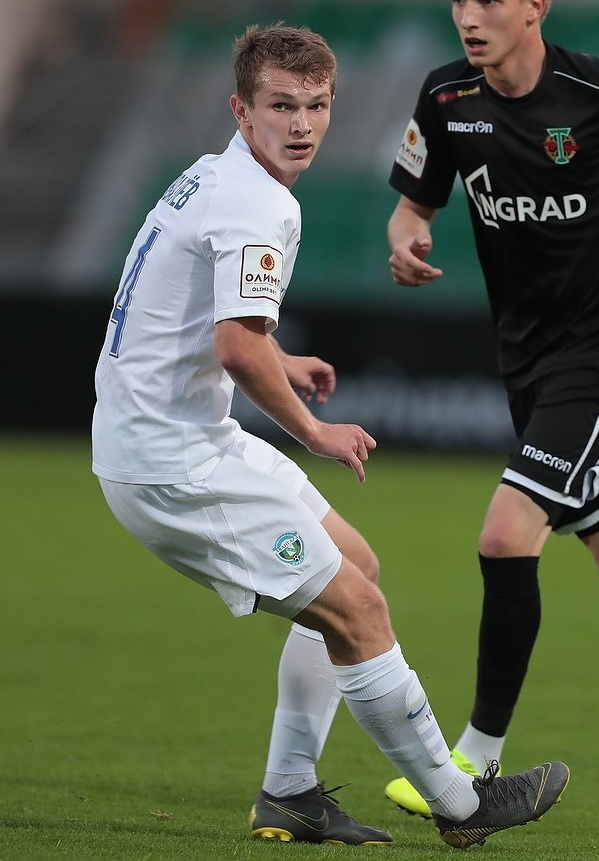
- Kovalyov with Avangard Kursk in 2019

Personal information
- Full name: Konstantin Sergeyevich Kovalyov
- Date of birth: 14 January 2000 (age 26)
- Place of birth: Kursk, Russia
- Height: 1.78 m (5 ft 10 in)
- Position: Right-back

Team information
- Current team: Volga Ulyanovsk
- Number: 20

Youth career
- 2013–2015: Energomash Belgorod
- 2016–2018: Avangard Kursk

Senior career*
Years	Team	Apps	(Gls)
2015–2016	Peny imeni Karla Libknekhta (amateur)		
2018–2020	Avangard Kursk	18	(1)
2020–2023	Rostov	1	(0)
2020–2021	→ Baltika Kaliningrad (loan)	22	(0)
2022	→ Baltika Kaliningrad (loan)	0	(0)
2023	→ Avangard Kursk (loan)	11	(1)
2023	Leon Saturn Ramenskoye	13	(1)
2024	Torpedo Moscow	1	(0)
2024–	Volga Ulyanovsk	49	(2)
- * Club domestic league appearances and goals as of 16 May 2026

Konstantin Sergeyevich Kovalyov (Russian: Константин Сергеевич Ковалёв; born 14 January 2000) is a Russian football player who plays as a right-back for Volga Ulyanovsk.

== Club career ==
He made his debut in the Russian Football National League for Avangard Kursk on 7 July 2019 in a game against Rotor Volgograd and was sent off for the second bookable offence in the 23rd minute of the game.

On 13 July 2020, he moved to the Russian Premier League club Rostov. He made his Russian Premier League debut for Rostov on 19 August 2020 in a game against Dynamo Moscow. On 22 September 2020, he was loaned to Baltika Kaliningrad. On 12 January 2021, Rostov recalled Kovalyov from loan. On 18 February 2021, he returned to Baltika on a new loan until the end of the 2020–21 season. On 28 December 2021, he returned to Baltika once again, on loan until the end of the 2021–22 season. However, he suffered a serious injury and did not appear for Baltika in that season.

== Career statistics ==
=== Club ===
As of 17 April 2022

Club	Season	League			Cup		Continental		Total	
Club	Season	Division	Apps	Goals	Apps	Goals	Apps	Goals	Apps	Goals
Avangard Kursk	2019–20	FNL	18	1	1	0	–		19	1
Rostov	2020–21	RPL	1	0	0	0	–		1	0
Baltika Kaliningrad (loan)	2020–21	FNL	22	0	–		–		22	0
Career total			41	1	1	0	0	0	42	1
