= Mikhail Osinov (footballer, born 2000) =

Russian footballer

Personal information
- Full name: Mikhail Mikhailovich Osinov
- Date of birth: 29 December 2000 (age 25)
- Place of birth: Volgograd, Russia
- Height: 1.76 m (5 ft 9 in)
- Positions: Defender; midfielder

Team information
- Current team: Spartak Tambov
- Number: 81

Senior career*
Years	Team	Apps	(Gls)
2017–2022	Rostov	0	(0)
2020	→ Nizhny Novgorod (loan)	10	(0)
2021	→ Mashuk-KMV (loan)	11	(0)
2021–2022	→ Olimp-Dolgoprudny-2 (loan)	25	(0)
2022–2023	Kosmos Dolgoprudny	30	(1)
2023–2024	Zenit Penza	13	(0)
2024	Dynamo Vladivostok	8	(0)
2024–2025	Ural-2 Yekaterinburg	20	(4)
2026–	Spartak Tambov	20	(2)
- * Club domestic league appearances and goals as of 31 October 2026

Mikhail Mikhailovich Osinov (Russian: Михаил Михайлович Осинов; born 29 December 2000) is a Russian football player who plays as a right back or right midfielder for Spartak Tambov.

== Club career ==
He made his debut for the main squad of Rostov on 26 September 2018 in a Russian Cup game against Syzran-2003.

On 9 July 2021, he joined Olimp-Dolgoprudny-2 on loan.

== Personal life ==
His father Mikhail Osinov also was a professional footballer.
