= FC Kuban-Holding Pavlovskaya =

Russian football club

- Full name: Football Club Kuban-Holding Pavlovskaya
- Founded: 2015
- Chairman: Yuliya Blinkova
- Manager: Dmitry Fomin
- League: Russian Amateur Football League
- 2025: Russian Second League, Division B, Group 1, 3rd
- Website: http://fckh.ru/
Home colours	Away colours

FC Kuban-Holding Pavlovskaya (Russian: ФК «Кубань-Холдинг» (Павловская)) is a Russian football team based in Pavlovskaya, Krasnodar Krai. It was founded in 2015 and played on the amateur level. For 2020–21 season, it received the license for the third-tier Russian Professional Football League. On 16 January 2026, the management of the club announced voluntary relegation back to regional levels.
