= 2019–20 FC Rostov season =

FC Rostov
2019–20 season
- Chairman: Viktor Goncharov
- Manager: Valeri Karpin
- Stadium: Rostov Arena
- Premier League: 5th
- Russian Cup: Round of 16 vs Spartak Moscow
- Top goalscorer: League: Eldor Shomurodov (11); All: Eldor Shomurodov (11)
Home colours	Away colours

The 2019–20 FC Rostov season was the club's eleventh successive season in the Russian Premier League, the highest tier of football in Russia.

== Season events ==
On 13 June, Rostov announced Adidas as their new technical partner.

On 17 March, the Russian Premier League postponed all league fixtures until April 10th due to the COVID-19 pandemic.

On 1 April, the Russian Football Union extended the suspension of football until 31 May.

On 15 May, the Russian Football Union announced that the Russian Premier League season would resume on 21 June.

On 17 June, Rostov announced that six players had tested positive for COVID-19, resulting 42 employees of the club going into a 2-week quarantine, with their youth team travelling to play Sochi on 19 June.

=== Transfers ===
On 7 June, Rostov announced the signing of Dmitri Chistyakov on a four-year contract from Tambov.

On 11 June, Rostov announced the signing of Aleksandr Saplinov on a four-year contract from Baltika Kaliningrad.

On 24 June, Sergei Parshivlyuk left Rostov and signed for Dynamo Moscow

On 28 June, Matija Boben made his loan move to Livorno permanent.

On 3 July, Aleksei Kozlov joined from Dynamo Moscow.

On 9 July, Konstantin Pliyev moved to Rubin Kazan on a season-long loan deal.

On 11 July, Rostov signed four-year contracts with Danila Proshlyakov, joining from Spartak Moscow, and Aleksandr Dolgov who joined from Lokomotiv Moscow.

On 12 July, Yegor Baburin signed on a four-year contract from Zenit St.Petersburg, and Vladimir Medved joined from FC Slutsk.

On 17 July, Rostov announced that Alexandru Gațcan would leave the club after their match against Spartak Moscow on 20 July, ending his 11-year stint at the club.

On 19 July, Reziuan Mirzov moved to Spartak Moscow.

On 20 July, Viðar Örn Kjartansson moved to Rubin Kazan on loan.

On 1 August, Artyom Shchadin left Rostov to sign for Torpedo-BelAZ Zhodino.

On 28 September, Pavel Mamayev signed on a two-year contract after he'd been released by Krasnodar on 20 September.

On 1 January, Ragnar Sigurðsson left Rostov by mutual consent.

On 9 January, Rostov announced the signing of Maksim Osipenko to a 4.5-year contract on a free transfer following his release from Tambov.

On 12 February, Rostov signed Maksim Rudakov from Zenit St.Petersburg on a 4.5-year contract.

On 14 February, Anton Salétros joined Sarpsborg 08 on loan until 31 July.

On 3 July, Rostov announced the signing of Russian U18 forward Danila Sukhomlinov.

On 7 July, Rostov announced the signing of David Toshevski from FK Rabotnički on a five-year contract.

On 9 July, Rostov announced the signing of Kento Hashimoto from FC Tokyo on a four-year contract.

On 13 July, Rostov announced the signing of Konstantin Kovalyov from Avangard Kursk.

=== New contracts ===
On 7 June, Sergei Pesyakov signed a new three-contract whilst Eldor Shomurodov signed a new five-year contract.

On 14 June 2019, Rostov announced that Roman Eremenko had extended his contract with the club for four-years.

On 17 June 2019, Rostov announced that Alexandru Gațcan had extended his contract with the club for another year.

== Squad ==
As of match played 22 July 2020

No.	Name	Nationality	Position	Date of birth (age)	Signed from	Signed in	Contract ends	Apps.	Goals
Goalkeepers
1	Yegor Baburin	(Russia)	GK	9 August 1993 (aged 26)	Zenit St.Petersburg	2019	2024	12	0
30	Sergei Pesyakov	(Russia)	GK	16 December 1988 (aged 31)	Spartak Moscow	2017	2022	66	0
46	Denis Popov	(Russia)	GK	29 August 2002 (aged 17)	Academy	2020		1	0
77	Maksim Rudakov	(Russia)	GK	22 January 1996 (aged 24)	Zenit St.Petersburg	2020	2024	0	0
Defenders
4	Danila Vedernikov	(Russia)	DF	6 June 2001 (aged 19)	Krasnodar	2019		7	0
5	Dennis Hadžikadunić	(Sweden)	DF	9 July 1998 (aged 22)	Malmö FF	2018		31	2
25	Arseny Logashov	(Russia)	DF	18 March 1989 (aged 31)	Baltika Kaliningrad	2018		55	2
28	Yevgeni Chernov	(Russia)	DF	23 October 1992 (aged 27)	Zenit St.Petersburg	2019	2022	44	0
34	Aleksei Kozlov	(Russia)	DF	25 December 1986 (aged 33)	Dynamo Moscow	2019		24	0
55	Maksim Osipenko	(Russia)	DF	16 May 1994 (aged 26)	Tambov	2020	2024	9	0
65	Timofey Kalistratov	(Russia)	DF	18 February 2003 (aged 17)	Academy	2020		1	0
66	William Rogava	(Russia)	DF	25 January 2003 (aged 17)	Academy	2020		1	0
71	Kirill Girnyk	(Russia)	DF	31 March 2003 (aged 17)	Academy	2020		1	0
72	Vladimir Abramov	(Russia)	DF	5 April 2002 (aged 18)	Academy	2020		1	0
78	Dmitri Chistyakov	(Russia)	DF	13 January 1994 (aged 26)	Tambov	2019	2023	23	1
81	Mikhail Osinov	(Russia)	DF	29 December 2000 (aged 19)	Academy	2017		1	0
Midfielders
7	Roman Eremenko	(Finland)	MF	19 March 1987 (aged 33)	Spartak Moscow	2019	2023	30	9
8	Ivelin Popov	(Bulgaria)	MF	26 October 1987 (aged 32)	Spartak Moscow	2019		42	9
10	Pavel Mamayev	(Russia)	MF	17 September 1988 (aged 31)	Krasnodar	2019	2021	7	2
11	Aleksei Ionov	(Russia)	MF	18 February 1989 (aged 31)	Dynamo Moscow	2017		76	17
15	Danil Glebov	(Russia)	MF	3 November 1999 (aged 20)	Anzhi Makhachkala	2019		32	0
17	Mathias Normann	(Norway)	MF	28 May 1996 (aged 24)	Brighton & Hove Albion	2019		35	1
18	Baktiyar Zaynutdinov	(Kazakhstan)	MF	2 April 1998 (aged 22)	Astana	2019		31	4
19	Khoren Bayramyan	(Russia)	MF	7 January 1992 (aged 28)	Academy	2011		95	5
26	Aleksandr Saplinov	(Russia)	MF	12 August 1997 (aged 22)	Baltika Kaliningrad	2019	2023	23	2
51	Yevgeni Cherkes	(Russia)	MF	23 June 2001 (aged 19)	Salyut Belgorod	2019		1	0
52	Roman Romanov	(Russia)	MF	28 March 2003 (aged 17)	Academy	2020		1	1
60	Pavel Gorelov	(Russia)	MF	22 January 2003 (aged 17)	Academy	2020		1	0
61	Nikita Kashtan	(Russia)	MF	1 September 2003 (aged 16)	Academy	2020		1	0
62	Ivan Komarov	(Russia)	MF	15 April 2003 (aged 17)	Academy	2020		1	0
74	Nikita Kupriyanov	(Russia)	MF	23 April 2002 (aged 18)	Academy	2020		1	0
82	Maksim Stavtsev	(Russia)	MF	29 January 2004 (aged 16)	Academy	2020		1	0
98	Sergey Kochkanyan	(Russia)	MF	5 May 2003 (aged 17)	Academy	2020		1	0
	Saeid Ezatolahi	(Iran)	MF	1 October 1996 (aged 23)	Atlético Madrid C	2017		18	2
	Kento Hashimoto	(Japan)	MF	16 August 1993 (aged 26)	FC Tokyo	2020	2024	0	0
	Konstantin Kovalyov	(Russia)	MF	14 January 2000 (aged 20)	Avangard Kursk	2020		0	0
Forwards
13	Danila Proshlyakov	(Russia)	FW	8 March 2000 (aged 20)	Spartak Moscow	2019	2024	7	0
14	Eldor Shomurodov	(Uzbekistan)	FW	29 June 1995 (aged 25)	Bunyodkor	2017	2024	81	17
47	Aleksandr Dolgov	(Russia)	FW	24 September 1998 (aged 21)	Lokomotiv Moscow	2019	2024	17	1
57	Nikita Kolotievskiy	(Russia)	FW	4 March 2001 (aged 19)	Academy	2020		1	0
58	Tamaz Topuria	(Russia)	FW	29 January 2002 (aged 18)	Academy	2020		1	0
75	Danil Khromov	(Russia)	FW	25 December 2002 (aged 17)	Academy	2020		1	0
84	Aleksey Kornienko	(Russia)	FW	15 January 2003 (aged 17)	Academy	2020		1	0
	David Toshevski	(North Macedonia)	FW	16 July 2001 (aged 19)	Rabotnički	2020	2025	0	0
	Danila Sukhomlinov	(Russia)	FW	13 August 2002 (aged 17)	Saturn-Master Egorjevsk	2020		0	0
Out on loan
9	Björn Bergmann Sigurðarson	(Iceland)	FW	26 February 1991 (aged 29)	Molde	2018		39	8
23	Viðar Örn Kjartansson	(Iceland)	FW	11 March 1990 (aged 30)	Maccabi Tel Aviv	2018		11	2
23	Aleksandr Zuyev	(Russia)	MF	26 June 1996 (aged 24)	Spartak Moscow	2018		59	4
33	Konstantin Pliyev	(Russia)	DF	26 October 1996 (aged 23)	Volgar Astrakhan	2018		6	0
	Nikolai Poyarkov	(Russia)	DF	16 October 1999 (aged 20)	Lokomotiv Moscow	2019		0	0
	Anton Salétros	(Sweden)	MF	12 April 1996 (aged 24)	AIK	2018		9	1
Left during the season
3	Maciej Wilusz	(Poland)	DF	25 September 1988 (aged 31)	Lech Poznań	2017		46	1
6	Ragnar Sigurðsson	(Iceland)	DF	19 June 1986 (aged 34)	Fulham	2018		53	0
20	Vladimir Medved	(Belarus)	MF	4 November 1999 (aged 20)	Slutsk	2019		0	0
22	Kirill Malyarov	(Russia)	DF	7 March 1997 (aged 23)	Rotor Volgograd	2019		1	0
71	Dmitri Veber	(Russia)	MF	10 February 1999 (aged 21)	SKA Rostov-on-Don	2016		3	0
84	Alexandru Gațcan	(Moldova)	MF	27 March 1984 (aged 36)	Rubin Kazan	2008	2020	315	24
92	Artyom Shchadin	(Russia)	DF	1 November 1992 (aged 27)	Kuban Krasnodar	2018		8	0
	Reziuan Mirzov	(Russia)	MF	22 June 1993 (aged 27)	Akhmat Grozny	2017		3	0

=== On loan ===
Note: Flags indicate national team as defined under FIFA eligibility rules; some limited exceptions apply. Players may hold more than one non-FIFA nationality.

No.	Pos.	Nation	Player
—	DF	RUS	Konstantin Pliyev (at Rubin Kazan)
—	DF	RUS	Nikolai Poyarkov (at Rubin Kazan)
—	MF	RUS	Aleksandr Zuyev (at Rubin Kazan)

No.	Pos.	Nation	Player
—	MF	SWE	Anton Salétros (at Sarpsborg 08)
—	FW	ISL	Viðar Örn Kjartansson (at Yeni Malatyaspor)
—	FW	ISL	Björn Bergmann Sigurðarson (at APOEL)

=== Left club during season ===
Note: Flags indicate national team as defined under FIFA eligibility rules; some limited exceptions apply. Players may hold more than one non-FIFA nationality.

No.	Pos.	Nation	Player
—	DF	POL	Maciej Wilusz (to Ural Yekaterinburg)
—	DF	ISL	Ragnar Sigurðsson (to Copenhagen)
—	DF	RUS	Kirill Malyarov
—	DF	RUS	Artyom Shchadin (to Torpedo-BelAZ Zhodino)

No.	Pos.	Nation	Player
—	MF	BLR	Vladimir Medved
—	MF	MDA	Alexandru Gațcan (to Krylia Sovetov)
—	MF	RUS	Dmitri Veber
—	MF	RUS	Reziuan Mirzov (to Spartak Moscow)

== Transfers ==
=== In ===
Date	Position	Nationality	Name	From	Fee	Ref.
Summer 2019	DF	(Russia)	Danila Vedernikov	Krasnodar	Undisclosed	
Summer 2019	MF	(Russia)	Yevgeni Cherkes	Salyut Belgorod	Undisclosed	
7 June 2019	DF	(Russia)	Dmitri Chistyakov	Tambov	Undisclosed	
11 June 2019	MF	(Russia)	Aleksandr Saplinov	Baltika Kaliningrad	Undisclosed	
3 July 2019	DF	(Russia)	Aleksei Kozlov	Dynamo Moscow	Undisclosed	
11 July 2019	FW	(Russia)	Danila Proshlyakov	Spartak Moscow	Undisclosed	
11 July 2019	FW	(Russia)	Aleksandr Dolgov	Lokomotiv Moscow	Undisclosed	
12 July 2019	GK	(Russia)	Yegor Baburin	Zenit St.Petersburg	Undisclosed	
12 July 2019	MF	(Belarus)	Vladimir Medved	Slutsk	Undisclosed	
2 September 2019	DF	(Russia)	Nikolai Poyarkov	Lokomotiv Moscow	Undisclosed	
28 September 2019	MF	(Russia)	Pavel Mamayev	Krasnodar	Free	
9 January 2020	DF	(Russia)	Maksim Osipenko	Tambov	Free	
12 February 2020	GK	(Russia)	Maksim Rudakov	Zenit St.Petersburg	Undisclosed	
3 July 2020	FW	(Russia)	Danila Sukhomlinov	Saturn-Master Egorjevsk	Undisclosed	
7 July 2020	FW	(North Macedonia)	David Toshevski	Rabotnički	Undisclosed	
9 July 2020	MF	(Japan)	Kento Hashimoto	FC Tokyo	Undisclosed	
13 July 2020	MF	(Russia)	Konstantin Kovalyov	Avangard Kursk	Undisclosed	

=== Out ===
Date	Position	Nationality	Name	To	Fee	Ref.
Summer 2019	DF	(Russia)	Vadim Lazarev	Chayka Peschanokopskoye	Undisclosed	
24 June 2019	DF	(Russia)	Sergei Parshivlyuk	Dynamo Moscow	Undisclosed	
28 June 2019	DF	(Slovenia)	Matija Boben	Livorno	Undisclosed	
5 July 2019	GK	(Russia)	Ilya Abayev	Chertanovo Moscow	Undisclosed	
19 July 2019	MF	(Russia)	Reziuan Mirzov	Spartak Moscow	Undisclosed	
1 August 2019	DF	(Russia)	Artyom Shchadin	Torpedo-BelAZ Zhodino	Undisclosed	
24 June 2020	MF	(Russia)	Gocha Gogriciani	Rostov	Undisclosed	

=== Loans out ===
Date from	Position	Nationality	Name	To	Date to	Ref.
6 February 2019	MF	(Sweden)	Anton Salétros	AIK	31 December 2019	
9 July 2019	DF	(Russia)	Konstantin Pliyev	Rubin Kazan	End of Season	
20 July 2019	FW	(Iceland)	Viðar Örn Kjartansson	Rubin Kazan	11 January 2020	
28 August 2019	MF	(Iran)	Saeid Ezatolahi	Eupen	11 June 2020	
2 September 2019	DF	(Russia)	Nikolai Poyarkov	Rubin Kazan	End of season	
22 January 2020	FW	(Iceland)	Björn Bergmann Sigurðarson	APOEL	End of Season	
27 January 2020	FW	(Iceland)	Viðar Örn Kjartansson	Yeni Malatyaspor	End of Season	
14 February 2020	MF	(Sweden)	Anton Salétros	Sarpsborg 08	31 July 2020	

=== Released ===
Date	Position	Nationality	Name	Joined	Date
Summer 2019	MF	(Russia)	Nikita Kryukov	Zenit-Izhevsk	
Summer 2019	MF	(Russia)	Maksim Skrynnik	SKA Rostov-on-Don	
Summer 2019	MF	(Russia)	Dmitri Solovyov	Veles Moscow	
Summer 2019	MF	(Russia)	Aleksandr Troshechkin	Khimki	
20 July 2019	MF	(Moldova)	Alexandru Gațcan	Krylia Sovetov	23 July 2019
1 January 2019	DF	(Russia)	Dmitri Veber	Veles Moscow	
1 January 2020	DF	(Iceland)	Ragnar Sigurðsson	Copenhagen	12 January 2020
15 January 2019	DF	(Poland)	Maciej Wilusz	Ural Yekaterinburg	16 January 2020
27 January 2020	DF	(Russia)	Kirill Malyarov	Belshina Bobruisk	
12 February 2020	MF	(Belarus)	Vladimir Medved	Krylia Sovetov	

=== Trial ===
Date From	Date To	Position	Nationality	Name	Last club	Ref.
	2 July 2019	FW	(Canada)	Richie Ennin	Spartaks Jūrmala	
	2 July 2019	FW	(Russia)	Dmitry Poloz	Zenit St.Petersburg	

== Friendlies ==
20 June 2019	SKA Rostov-on-Don	1 – 3	Rostov	Rostov
MSK (UTC+3)	Goal	Report	Poloz; Sigurðarson	Stadium: SKA SKVO Stadium

26 June 2019 Match Premier Cup	Rostov	2 – 0	Spartak Moscow	Pöllau, Austria
19:00 MSK (UTC+3)	Poloz 3'; Saplinov 32'; Ennin (yellow card) 87'	Report		Stadium: Sparkasse Pöllau AG stadium

30 June 2019 Match Premier Cup	Rostov	0 – 3	Krasnodar	Pöllau, Austria
11:30 MSK (UTC+3)		Report	Martynovich (yellow card) 23'; Ari 38' (pen.); Utkin 61'; Khalnazarov 84'	Stadium: Sparkasse Pöllau AG stadium

3 July 2019 Match Premier Cup	Rostov	2 – 1	CSKA Moscow	Pöllau, Austria
19:00 MSK (UTC+3)	Shomurodov 10', 44'	Report	Chalov 28'	Stadium: Sparkasse Pöllau AG stadium

7 July 2019	Rostov (Russia)	1 – 2	(Germany) Hannover 96	Pöllau, Austria
17:00 MSK (UTC+3)	Eremenko 70'	Report	Weydandt 3'; Muslija 45+6'	Stadium: Sparkasse Pöllau AG stadium

24 January 2020	Rostov (Russia)	3 – 1	(Latvia) Riga	Abu Dhabi, United Arab Emirates
16:00 MSK (UTC+3)	Eremenko 27', 42'; Mamayev 63'	Report	J.Klemenčuks 2'

1 February 2020 Match Premier Cup	Spartak Moscow (Russia)	2 – 1	(Russia) Rostov	Doha, Qatar
18:00 MSK (UTC+3)	Schürrle (yellow card) 7'; Dzhikiya (yellow card) 11'; Mirzov 50', 75'	Report	Normann (yellow card) 43'; Hadžikadunić 89'	Stadium: Aspire Dome

4 February 2020 Match Premier Cup	Partizan (Serbia)	1 – 3	(Russia) Rostov	Doha, Qatar
18:00 MSK (UTC+3)	Sadiq 87' (pen.)	Report	Mamayev 32'; Dolgov 57'; Shomurodov 73'; Bezrukov (yellow card) 74'	Stadium: Aspire Dome

9 February 2020 Match Premier Cup	Rostov (Russia)	3 – 3 (4 – 5 p)	(Russia) Lokomotiv Moscow	Doha, Qatar
18:00 MSK (UTC+3)	Osipenko 42'; Mamayev 50'; Eremenko 71'	Report	Murilo 19'; Krychowiak 61'; Kulikov (yellow card) 63'; Rybchinsky 74'	Stadium: Aspire Dome
	Penalties
	Popov (penalty scored); Chernov (penalty missed); Osipov (penalty scored); Saplinov (penalty scored); Hadžikadunić (penalty scored); Kozhemyakin (penalty missed)		Ignatyev (penalty scored); Krychowiak (penalty scored); Barinov (penalty scored); Kolomeytsev (penalty missed); Kulikov (penalty scored); Rybchinsky (penalty scored)

15 February 2020	Rostov (Russia)	1 – 1	(Sweden) AIK	Marbella, Spain
18:00 MSK (UTC+3)	Shomurodov 56' (pen.)	Report	Asani 74' (pen.)

19 February 2020	Rostov (Russia)	0 – 1	(Norway) Molde	Marbella, Spain
18:00 MSK (UTC+3)		Report	Moström 3'

23 February 2020	Rostov	–	Krasnodar	Marbella, Spain
16:00 MSK (UTC+3)

== Competitions ==
=== Premier League ===
==== Results by round ====
Round	1	2	3	4	5	6	7	8	9	10	11	12	13	14	15	16	17	18	19	20	21	22	23	24	25	26	27	28	29	30
Ground	H	H	A	A	H	A	H	A	H	A	H	A	A	H	A	H	A	H	A	A	H	H	A	H	H	A	H	A	A	H
Result	W	D	W	D	W	L	W	W	W	L	W	W	L	W	D	L	L	D	W	D	W	L	L	W	D	D	L	D	D	L
Position	4	4	2	3	2	5	3	3	3	3	3	2	4	2	2	3	5	5	3	3	3	4	4	4	4	4	5	5	5	5

Updated to match(es) played on 22 July 2020. Source: See Results
A = Away; H = Home; W = Win; D = Draw; L = Loss

==== Results ====
13 July 2019 1	Rostov	2 – 1	Orenburg	Rostov-on-Don
21:30 MSK (UTC+3)	Shomurodov 11'; Bayramyan (yellow card) 26'; Ionov 42'; Normann (yellow card) 54'	Report	Malyarov (yellow card) 43'; Despotović 49'; Sivakow (yellow card) 52'; Afonin (yellow card) 81'	Stadium: Rostov Arena; Attendance: 14,584; Referee: Vladislav Bezborodov

20 July 2019 2	Rostov	2 – 2	Spartak Moscow	Rostov-on-Don
21:30 MSK (UTC+3)	Bayramyan 23'; Zuyev (yellow card) 60' (goal) 90+1'; Eremenko (yellow card) 63'	Report	Luiz Adriano 25' (pen.); Dzhikiya 66'; Melkadze (yellow card) 73'; Bakayev (yellow card) 84'; Fernando (yellow card) 88'	Stadium: Rostov Arena; Attendance: 35,865; Referee: Kirill Levnikov

28 July 2019 3	Arsenal Tula	2 – 3	Rostov	Tula
16:30 MSK (UTC+3)	Grigalava (yellow card) 11'; Kostadinov (yellow card) 37'; Lutsenko 67'; Gorbatenko (yellow card) 80'; Čaušić 90+4'	Report	Eremenko 21'; Kozlov (yellow card) 27'; I.Popov (yellow card) 47'; Ionov 49'; Bayramyan (yellow card) 57'; Shomurodov 81'	Stadium: Arsenal Stadium; Attendance: 9,654; Referee: Aleksei Matyunin

3 August 2019 4	Ural Yekaterinburg	2 – 2	Rostov	Yekaterinburg
14:00 MSK (UTC+3)	Panyukov 14'; Haroyan (yellow card) 20'; Yemelyanov (yellow card) 52'; Ilyin 81'; Bavin (yellow card) 88'	Report	Normann (yellow card) 44'; Shomurodov (yellow card) 60' (goal) 67'; Sigurðarson 85'	Stadium: Central Stadium; Attendance: 18,199; Referee: Stanislav Vasilyev

12 August 2019 5	Rostov	1 – 0	Krylia Sovetov	Rostov-on-Don
20:00 MSK (UTC+3)	Shomurodov 33'; Chistyakov (yellow card) 63'; Kozlov (yellow card) 64'; Pesyakov (yellow card) 88'	Report		Stadium: Rostov Arena; Attendance: 28,674; Referee: Vasili Kazartsev

18 August 2019 6	Ufa	2 – 0	Rostov	Ufa
16:30 MSK (UTC+3)	Yemelyanov (yellow card) 22'; Igboun 40', 79'; Sukhov (yellow card) 89'; Jokić (yellow card) 90+4'	Report	Glebov (yellow card) 18'; Pesyakov (yellow card) 40'; Sigurðsson (yellow card) 73'	Stadium: Neftyanik Stadium; Attendance: 8,532; Referee: Evgeny Turbin

25 August 2019 7	Rostov	2 – 1	Rubin Kazan	Rostov-on-Don
19:00 MSK (UTC+3)	Shomurodov 29' (yellow card) 90+1'; Saplinov 87'	Report	Markov 15'	Stadium: Rostov Arena; Attendance: 35,031; Referee: Vitali Meshkov

31 August 2019 8	Lokomotiv Moscow	1 – 2	Rostov	Moscow
16:30 MSK (UTC+3)	Rybus (yellow card) 64'; An.Miranchuk 81'; Ignatyev (yellow card) 90+3'	Report	Normann (yellow card) 26'; Eremenko (yellow card) 39'; Shomurodov 41', 58'; Logashov (yellow card) 88'	Stadium: RZD Arena; Attendance: 19,356; Referee: Sergey Lapochkin

16 September 2019 9	Rostov	2 – 1	Akhmat Grozny	Rostov-on-Don
20:30 MSK (UTC+3)	Bayramyan 54'; Normann 64'; Saplinov (yellow card) 85'	Report	Roshi 19' (pen.); Shvets (red card) 62'	Stadium: Rostov Arena; Attendance: 28,772; Referee: Nikolay Voloshin

21 September 2019 10	Tambov	2 – 1	Rostov	Saransk
19:00 MSK (UTC+3)	Karasyov (yellow card) 7'; Kostyukov (penalty missed) 15'; Melkadze 38', 61'; Tetrashvili (yellow card) 90'; Shelia (yellow card) 90+3'	Report	Shomurodov 27' (yellow card) 90+2'; Chistyakov (yellow card) 81'; Dolgov (yellow card) 90'	Stadium: Mordovia Arena; Attendance: 3,258; Referee: Vasiliy Kazantsev

28 September 2019 11	Rostov	3 – 0	Dynamo Moscow	Rostov-on-Don
16:30 MSK (UTC+3)	I.Popov 25' (yellow card) 64'; Shomurodov 37'; Bayramyan (yellow card) 54'; Zaynutdinov 82'	Report	Szymański (yellow card) 16'; Pliyev (yellow card) 21' (yellow-red card) 66'; Kaboré (yellow card) 46'; Joãozinho (yellow card) 83'	Stadium: Rostov Arena; Attendance: 29,990; Referee: Evgeny Turbin

6 October 2019 12	CSKA Moscow	1 – 3	Rostov	Moscow
16:30 MSK (UTC+3)	Fernandes (yellow card) 30'; Vlašić 90+2'	Report	Bayramyan 11', 44'; Glebov (yellow card) 12'; Shomurodov 61'; Saplinov (yellow card) 86'	Stadium: VEB Arena; Attendance: 18,456; Referee: Vasili Kazartsev

19 October 2019 13	Zenit St.Petersburg	6 – 1	Rostov	Saint Petersburg
19:00 MSK (UTC+3)	Dzyuba 14' (pen.), 20', 80' (pen.); Ozdoyev (yellow card) 17'; Azmoun 44'; Barrios (yellow card) 56' (goal) 90+2'; Karavayev 61'; Ivanović (yellow card) 81'	Report	Hadžikadunić (yellow card) 12'; Eremenko (yellow card) 19' (goal) 83' (pen.); Chistyakov (yellow card) 78'; Chernov (yellow card) 79'	Stadium: Krestovsky Stadium; Attendance: 58,639; Referee: Sergei Karasev

26 October 2019 14	Rostov	2 – 0	Sochi	Rostov-on-Don
19:00 MSK (UTC+3)	Eremenko 41', 79'; I.Popov (yellow card) 88'; Glebov (yellow card) 90+1'	Report		Stadium: Rostov Arena; Attendance: 33,716; Referee: Evgeny Turbin

3 November 2019 15	Krasnodar	2 – 2	Rostov	Krasnodar
16:30 MSK (UTC+3)	Ignatyev 90+3'; Spajić 90+5'	Report	Ionov 34', 41'; I.Popov (yellow card) 53'; Eremenko (yellow card) 57'; Chistyakov (yellow card) 63'; Zaynutdinov (yellow card) 77'	Stadium: Krasnodar Stadium; Attendance: 34,265; Referee: Aleksei Eskov

9 November 2019 16	Rostov	1 – 2	Tambov	Rostov-on-Don
16:30 MSK (UTC+3)	Sigurðarson 7' (yellow card) 56'; Hadžikadunić (yellow card) 60'	Report	Osipenko (yellow card) 33'; Kostyukov (yellow card) 41'; Melkadze 52' (yellow card) 64'; Obukhov 70'; Oyewole (yellow card) 82'	Stadium: Rostov Arena; Attendance: 25,589; Referee: Sergei Karasev

23 November 2019 17	Dynamo Moscow	2 – 1	Rostov	Moscow
16:30 MSK (UTC+3)	Philipp 33' (pen.), 90' (pen.); Szymański (yellow card) 60'; Neustädter (yellow card) 90+5'; Parshivlyuk (yellow card) 90+7'	Report	Hadžikadunić (yellow card) 2'; I.Popov 13'; Ionov (penalty missed) 90+9	Stadium: VTB Arena; Attendance: 11,569; Referee: Vasili Kazartsev

30 November 2019 18	Rostov	0 – 0	Ural Yekaterinburg	Rostov-on-Don
16:30 MSK (UTC+3)	Kozlov (yellow card) 41'; Logashov (yellow card) 62'	Report	Fidler (yellow card) 67'; Palyakow (yellow card) 70'; Yegorychev (yellow card) 84'; Ilyin (yellow card) 90+2'	Stadium: Rostov Arena; Attendance: 11,309; Referee: Aleksey Sukhoy

8 December 2019 19	Spartak Moscow	1 – 4	Rostov	Moscow
19:00 MSK (UTC+3)	Dzhikiya (yellow card) 38'; Král (yellow card) 42'; Umyarov (yellow card) 77'; Ponce 81'	Report	I.Popov (yellow card) 18' (penalty missed) 45'; Zaynutdinov 22', 83'; Ionov 53'; Chistyakov 79'; Saplinov (yellow card) 90+2'	Stadium: Otkritie Arena; Attendance: 22,132; Referee: Evgeny Turbin

29 February 2020 20	Akhmat Grozny	1 – 1	Rostov	Grozny
19:00 MSK (UTC+3)	Roshi (yellow card) 18' (goal) 49' (pen.); Kharin (yellow card) 70'; Ismael (yellow card) 82'; Semyonov (yellow card) 86'; Berisha (yellow card) 90+1'	Report	Zaynutdinov (yellow card) 13'; Normann (yellow card) 32'; Shomurodov 45'; Hadžikadunić (yellow card) 46'	Stadium: Akhmat-Arena; Attendance: 12,681; Referee: Sergey Lapochkin

9 March 2020 21	Rostov	3 – 2	CSKA Moscow	Rostov-on-Don
14:00 MSK (UTC+3)	Glebov (yellow card) 17'; Eremenko (penalty missed) 21' 31'; I.Popov 53' (pen.) (yellow card) 87'; Mamayev 63' (yellow card) 64'; Zaynutdinov (yellow card) 69'; Chernov (yellow card) 77'	Report	Akhmetov (red card) 20'; Sigurðsson 25' (yellow card) 90+7'; Karpov (red card) 51'; Fernandes (yellow card) 52'; Oblyakov (yellow card) 57'; Diveyev (yellow card) 74'; Osipenko 77' (o.g.); Chalov (penalty missed) 86'; Shchennikov (yellow card) 89'	Stadium: Rostov Arena; Attendance: 40,432; Referee: Vladislav Bezborodov

15 March 2020 22	Rostov	1 – 3	Spartak Moscow	Rostov-on-Don
19:00 MSK (UTC+3)	Hadžikadunić (yellow card) 54'; I.Popov 64' (pen.); Normann (yellow card) 86'	Report	Pesyakov 34' (o.g.); Zhemaletdinov 38'; Krychowiak 42'; Barinov (yellow card) 90+1'	Stadium: Rostov Arena; Referee: Mikhail Vilkov

19 June 2020 23	Sochi	10 – 1	Rostov	Sochi
20:00 MSK (UTC+3)	Abramov (o.g.); Kokorin 15', 44', 51'; Zabolotny (penalty missed) 26' 45+1', 47'; Margasov (yellow card) 38'; Burmistrov (yellow card) 42'; Novoseltsev 53'; Poloz 74', 86'; Koldunov 87'	Report	Romanov 1'; Girnyk (yellow card) 26'; Topuria (yellow card) 43'; Gorelov (yellow card) 63'	Stadium: Fisht Olympic Stadium; Referee: Aleksey Sukhoy
Note: Match originally scheduled for 20 March, but postponed on 17 March due to the COVID-19 pandemic. Rostov fielded their youth team due to their first team being placed in quarantine.

27 June 2020 24	Rostov	2 – 1	Arsenal Tula	Rostov-on-Don
20:00 MSK (UTC+3)	Mamayev 1'; Ionov 17'; Glebov (yellow card) 62'; Kozlov (yellow card) 66'; Proshlyakov (yellow card) 76' (yellow-red card) 90+5'	Report	Denisov (yellow card) 10'; Lesovoy (yellow card) 57'; Lutsenko 58'; Gorbatenko (yellow card) 70'; Kavalyow (yellow card) 77'; K.Kangwa (yellow card) 90'	Stadium: Rostov Arena; Referee: Vladimir Moskalev
Note: Match originally scheduled for 4 April, but postponed on 17 March due to the COVID-19 pandemic.

1 July 2020 25	Rostov	1 – 1	Krasnodar	Rostov-on-Don
20:00 MSK (UTC+3)	Shomurodov (yellow card) 59'; Mamayev (yellow card) 65'; Saplinov (yellow card) 65'; Zaynutdinov (yellow card) 68'; Popov 90+11' (pen.); Dolgov (yellow card) 90+16'	Report	Berg 13'; Chernikov (yellow card) 79'; Safonov (yellow card) 89'; Suleymanov (yellow card) 90+7'; Fernandes (yellow card) 90+8'	Stadium: Rostov Arena; Referee: Vitali Meshkov
Note: Match originally scheduled for 11 April, but postponed on 1 April due to the COVID-19 pandemic.

4 July 2020 26	Krylia Sovetov	0 – 0	Rostov	Samara
18:30 MSK (UTC+3)	Gațcan (yellow card) 22'; Poluyakhtov (red card) 25'; Glushenkov (yellow card) 39'; Chicherin (yellow card) 57'	Report	Chistyakov (yellow card) 11'; Normann (yellow card) 41'; Vedernikov (yellow card) 45+1' (yellow-red card) 55'	Stadium: Samara Arena; Referee: Nikolay Voloshin
Note: Match originally scheduled for 19 April, but postponed on 1 April due to the COVID-19 pandemic.

8 July 2020 27	Rostov	1 – 2	Ufa	Rostov-on-Don
20:30 MSK (UTC+3)	Hadžikadunić 27'; Popov (yellow card) 45'; Bayramyan (yellow card) 67'; Glebov (yellow card) 83'; Normann (yellow card) 86'; Proshlyakov (yellow card) 89'; Logashov (yellow card) 90+1'	Report	Tabidze (yellow card) 61'; Fomin 68' (pen.); Krotov 75'; Aliyev (yellow card) 85'	Stadium: Rostov Arena; Referee: Aleksei Eskov
Note: Match originally scheduled for 25 April, but postponed on 1 April due to the COVID-19 pandemic.

12 July 2020 28	Orenburg	0 – 0	Rostov	Orenburg
18:30 MSK (UTC+3)	Malykh (yellow card) 19'	Report	Normann (yellow card) 44'	Stadium: Gazovik Stadium; Referee: Igor Panin
Note: Match originally scheduled for 2 May, but postponed on 1 April due to the COVID-19 pandemic.

16 July 2020 29	Rubin Kazan	0 – 0	Rostov	Kazan
18:00 MSK (UTC+3)	Samoshnikov (yellow card) 52'; Tarasov (yellow card) 66'; Pablo (yellow card) 81'; Uremović (yellow card) 85'	Report	Chernov (yellow card) 18'; Popov (yellow card) 23'; Bayramyan (yellow card) 38'; Glebov (yellow card) 45+1'; Dolgov (yellow card) 80'	Stadium: Kazan Arena; Referee: Vasiliy Kazantsev
Note: Match originally scheduled for 11 May, but postponed on 1 April due to the COVID-19 pandemic.

22 July 2020 30	Rostov	1 – 2	Zenit St.Petersburg	Rostov-on-Don
19:00 MSK (UTC+3)	Zaynutdinov 18'; Normann (yellow card) 42'; Hadžikadunić (yellow card) 66'; Saplinov (yellow card) 90+1'	Report	Rigoni 72'; Azmoun 75'; Shatov (yellow card) 82'	Stadium: Rostov Arena; Referee: Sergei Karasev
Note: Match originally scheduled for 17 May, but postponed on 1 April due to the COVID-19 pandemic.

==== League table ====
Pos	Team	Pld	W	D	L	GF	GA	GD	Pts	Qualification or relegation
3	Krasnodar	30	14	10	6	49	30	+19	52	Qualification for the Champions League play-off round
4	CSKA Moscow	30	14	8	8	43	29	+14	50	Qualification for the Europa League group stage
5	Rostov	30	12	9	9	45	50	−5	45	Qualification for the Europa League third qualifying round
6	Dynamo Moscow	30	11	8	11	27	30	−3	41	Qualification for the Europa League second qualifying round
7	Spartak Moscow	30	11	6	13	35	33	+2	39	

Source: Russian Premier Liga, Soccerway
Rules for classification: 1) Points; 2) Head-to-head points; 3) Head-to-head matches won; 4) Head-to-head goal difference; 5) Head-to-head goals scored; 6) Matches won; 7) Goal difference; 8) Goals scored; 9) Play-off.

=== Russian Cup ===
25 September 2019 Round of 32	Mordovia Saransk	0 – 2	Rostov	Saransk
18:30 MSK (UTC+3)	Poyarkov (yellow card) 37'; Sukharev (yellow card) 50'	Report	Popov 51' (pen.); Saplinov 57'	Stadium: Start Stadium; Attendance: 1,752; Referee: Aleksey Amelin

31 October 2019 Round of 16	Spartak Moscow	2 – 1	Rostov	Moscow
19:30 MSK (UTC+3)	Ponce (yellow card) 28'; Larsson 43', 59'; Ayrton (yellow card) 45'; Dzhikiya (yellow card) 73'	Report	Zaynutdinov (yellow card) 53'; Dolgov 86'	Stadium: Otkritie Arena; Referee: Pavel Kukuyan

== Squad statistics ==
As of match played 22 July 2020

=== Appearances and goals ===
No.	Pos	Nat	Player	Total		Premier League		Russian Cup	
No.	Pos	Nat	Player	Apps	Goals	Apps	Goals	Apps	Goals
1	GK	(Russia) RUS	Yegor Baburin	12	0	12	0	0	0
4	DF	(Russia) RUS	Danila Vedernikov	7	0	0+5	0	2	0
5	DF	(Sweden) SWE	Dennis Hadžikadunić	19	1	15+2	1	2	0
7	MF	(Finland) FIN	Roman Eremenko	19	5	16+3	5	0	0
8	MF	(Bulgaria) BUL	Ivelin Popov	27	6	23+2	5	2	1
10	MF	(Russia) RUS	Pavel Mamayev	7	2	6+1	2	0	0
11	MF	(Russia) RUS	Aleksei Ionov	25	6	25	6	0	0
13	FW	(Russia) RUS	Danila Proshlyakov	7	0	1+6	0	0	0
14	FW	(Uzbekistan) UZB	Eldor Shomurodov	30	11	28	11	0+2	0
15	MF	(Russia) RUS	Danil Glebov	21	0	13+6	0	2	0
17	MF	(Norway) NOR	Mathias Normann	24	1	22+1	1	0+1	0
18	MF	(Kazakhstan) KAZ	Baktiyar Zaynutdinov	19	4	10+7	4	1+1	0
19	MF	(Russia) RUS	Khoren Bayramyan	28	4	24+2	4	1+1	0
23	MF	(Russia) RUS	Aleksandr Zuyev	7	1	1+6	1	0	0
25	DF	(Russia) RUS	Arseny Logashov	12	0	2+8	0	2	0
26	MF	(Russia) RUS	Aleksandr Saplinov	23	2	6+15	1	2	1
28	DF	(Russia) RUS	Yevgeni Chernov	29	0	29	0	0	0
30	GK	(Russia) RUS	Sergei Pesyakov	19	0	17	0	2	0
34	DF	(Russia) RUS	Aleksei Kozlov	24	0	24	0	0	0
46	GK	(Russia) RUS	Denis Popov	1	0	1	0	0	0
47	FW	(Russia) RUS	Aleksandr Dolgov	16	1	1+13	0	1+1	1
51	MF	(Russia) RUS	Yevgeni Cherkes	1	0	0+1	0	0	0
52	MF	(Russia) RUS	Roman Romanov	1	1	1	1	0	0
55	DF	(Russia) RUS	Maksim Osipenko	9	0	9	0	0	0
57	FW	(Russia) RUS	Nikita Kolotievskiy	1	0	1	0	0	0
58	FW	(Russia) RUS	Tamaz Topuria	1	0	1	0	0	0
60	MF	(Russia) RUS	Pavel Gorelov	1	0	1	0	0	0
61	MF	(Russia) RUS	Nikita Kashtan	1	0	0+1	0	0	0
62	MF	(Russia) RUS	Ivan Komarov	1	0	0+1	0	0	0
65	DF	(Russia) RUS	Timofey Kalistratov	1	0	1	0	0	0
66	DF	(Russia) RUS	William Rogava	1	0	1	0	0	0
71	DF	(Russia) RUS	Kirill Girnyk	1	0	1	0	0	0
72	DF	(Russia) RUS	Vladimir Abramov	1	0	1	0	0	0
74	MF	(Russia) RUS	Nikita Kupriyanov	1	0	1	0	0	0
75	FW	(Russia) RUS	Danil Khromov	1	0	1	0	0	0
78	DF	(Russia) RUS	Dmitri Chistyakov	23	1	22	1	1	0
82	MF	(Russia) RUS	Maksim Stavtsev	1	0	0+1	0	0	0
84	FW	(Russia) RUS	Aleksey Kornienko	1	0	0+1	0	0	0
98	MF	(Russia) RUS	Sergey Kochkanyan	1	0	0+1	0	0	0
Players away from the club on loan:
9	FW	(Iceland) ISL	Björn Bergmann Sigurðarson	7	2	1+5	2	1	0
Players who appeared for Rostov but left during the season:
3	DF	(Poland) POL	Maciej Wilusz	2	0	0	0	2	0
6	DF	(Iceland) ISL	Ragnar Sigurðsson	13	0	12+1	0	0	0
22	DF	(Russia) RUS	Kirill Malyarov	1	0	0	0	1	0
84	MF	(Moldova) MDA	Alexandru Gațcan	1	0	0+1	0	0	0

=== Goal scorers ===
Place	Position	Nation	Number	Name	Premier League	Russian Cup	Total
1	FW	(Uzbekistan)	14	Eldor Shomurodov	11	0	11
2	MF	(Russia)	11	Aleksei Ionov	6	0	6
2	MF	(Bulgaria)	8	Ivelin Popov	5	1	6
4	MF	(Finland)	7	Roman Eremenko	5	0	5
5	MF	(Russia)	19	Khoren Bayramyan	4	0	4
5	MF	(Kazakhstan)	18	Baktiyar Zaynutdinov	4	0	4
7	FW	(Iceland)	9	Björn Bergmann Sigurðarson	2	0	2
7	MF	(Russia)	10	Pavel Mamayev	2	0	2
7	MF	(Russia)	26	Aleksandr Saplinov	1	1	2
10	MF	(Russia)	23	Aleksandr Zuyev	1	0	1
10	MF	(Norway)	17	Mathias Normann	1	0	1
10	DF	(Russia)	78	Dmitri Chistyakov	1	0	1
10	MF	(Russia)	52	Roman Romanov	1	0	1
10	DF	(Sweden)	5	Dennis Hadžikadunić	1	0	1
10	FW	(Russia)	47	Aleksandr Dolgov	0	1	1
Total					45	3	48

=== Clean sheets ===
Place	Position	Nation	Number	Name	Premier League	Russian Cup	Total
1	GK	(Russia)	30	Sergei Pesyakov	5	1	6
2	GK	(Russia)	1	Yegor Baburin	2	0	2
Total					7	1	8

=== Disciplinary record ===
Number	Nation	Position	Name	Premier League		Russian Cup		Total	
Number	Nation	Position	Name	Yellow card	Red card	Yellow card	Red card	Yellow card	Red card
4	(Russia)	DF	Danila Vedernikov	2	1	0	0	2	1
5	(Sweden)	DF	Dennis Hadžikadunić	6	0	0	0	6	0
7	(Finland)	MF	Roman Eremenko	4	0	0	0	4	0
8	(Bulgaria)	MF	Ivelin Popov	8	0	0	0	8	0
10	(Russia)	MF	Pavel Mamayev	2	0	0	0	2	0
13	(Russia)	FW	Danila Proshlyakov	3	1	0	0	3	1
14	(Uzbekistan)	FW	Eldor Shomurodov	4	0	0	0	4	0
15	(Russia)	MF	Danil Glebov	7	0	0	0	7	0
17	(Norway)	MF	Mathias Normann	9	0	0	0	9	0
18	(Kazakhstan)	MF	Baktiyar Zaynutdinov	4	0	1	0	5	0
19	(Russia)	MF	Khoren Bayramyan	5	0	0	0	5	0
23	(Russia)	MF	Aleksandr Zuyev	1	0	0	0	1	0
25	(Russia)	DF	Arseny Logashov	3	0	0	0	3	0
26	(Russia)	MF	Aleksandr Saplinov	5	0	0	0	5	0
28	(Russia)	DF	Yevgeni Chernov	3	0	0	0	3	0
30	(Russia)	GK	Sergei Pesyakov	2	0	0	0	2	0
34	(Russia)	DF	Aleksei Kozlov	4	0	0	0	4	0
47	(Russia)	FW	Aleksandr Dolgov	3	0	0	0	3	0
58	(Russia)	FW	Tamaz Topuria	1	0	0	0	1	0
60	(Russia)	FW	Pavel Gorelov	1	0	0	0	1	0
71	(Russia)	DF	Kirill Girnyk	1	0	0	0	1	0
78	(Russia)	DF	Dmitri Chistyakov	5	0	0	0	5	0
Players away on loan:
9	(Iceland)	FW	Björn Bergmann Sigurðarson	1	0	0	0	1	0
Players who left Rostov during the season:
6	(Iceland)	DF	Ragnar Sigurðsson	1	0	0	0	1	0
Total				85	2	1	0	86	2
