= List of Russian football transfers winter 2019–20 =

This is a list of Russian football transfers in the 2019–20 winter transfer window by club. Only clubs of the 2019–20 Russian Premier League are included.

== Russian Premier League 2019–20 ==
=== Akhmat Grozny ===
In: Note: Flags indicate national team as defined under FIFA eligibility rules; some limited exceptions apply. Players may hold more than one non-FIFA nationality.

No.	Pos.	Nation	Player
3	DF	RUS	Maksim Nenakhov (from Rotor Volgograd)
8	DF	SRB	Miroslav Bogosavac (on loan from (Serbia) Čukarički)
27	FW	BRA	Felipe Vizeu (on loan from (Italy) Udinese)
29	FW	RUS	Vladimir Ilyin (from Ural Yekaterinburg)
67	FW	RUS	Magomed Artsuyev (October 2019)
92	FW	RUS	Khalid Khamzatov
93	MF	RUS	Alvi Adilkhanov

Out: Note: Flags indicate national team as defined under FIFA eligibility rules; some limited exceptions apply. Players may hold more than one non-FIFA nationality.

No.	Pos.	Nation	Player
6	MF	RUS	Mikhail Gashchenkov (on loan to SKA-Khabarovsk)
8	MF	POL	Damian Szymański (on loan to (Greece) AEK Athens)
9	MF	POL	Konrad Michalak (on loan to (Turkey) Ankaragücü)
—	MF	RUS	Ayub Batsuyev (to (Kazakhstan) Taraz, previously on loan to Inter Cherkessk)
—	FW	RUS	Apti Akhyadov (to Tom Tomsk)

=== Arsenal Tula ===
In: Note: Flags indicate national team as defined under FIFA eligibility rules; some limited exceptions apply. Players may hold more than one non-FIFA nationality.

No.	Pos.	Nation	Player
3	DF	RUS	Artyom Sokol (end of loan to (Norway) Tromsø)
15	MF	BLR	Yury Kavalyow (from (Belarus) Shakhtyor Soligorsk)
18	MF	BLR	Valeriy Gromyko (from (Belarus) Shakhtyor Soligorsk)
19	GK	RUS	Yuri Lodygin (from (Turkey) Gaziantep)
34	GK	RUS	Grigori Kevayev (from Lada-Tolyatti)
38	MF	RUS	Ilya Kuleshin
49	MF	RUS	Valeri Kharitonov (from Metallurg-OEMK Stary Oskol)
51	FW	RUS	Konstantin Antipov (free agent)
53	DF	RUS	Pavel Khodeyev (last with Lokomotiv Moscow, October 2019)
56	DF	RUS	Dmitri Ilyukhin
59	DF	RUS	Aleksandr Smelov (from Rubin Kazan)
62	MF	RUS	Yevgeni Yevtushenko (from Novosibirsk-M)
64	MF	RUS	Emrakh Nabatov (from Lada-Tolyatti)
65	DF	RUS	Aleksandr Shpilevsky
69	FW	RUS	Dmitri Malikov (from Rodina Moscow)
76	DF	RUS	Artyom Sukhanov (from Lokomotiv Moscow)
77	FW	RUS	Roman Minayev (from Avangard Kursk)
85	MF	RUS	Kirill Shekhov (from CSKA Moscow)
86	DF	RUS	Nikita Gloydman (from Spartak Moscow academy)
95	GK	RUS	Andrei Sorokin (from Biolog-Novokubansk)

Out: Note: Flags indicate national team as defined under FIFA eligibility rules; some limited exceptions apply. Players may hold more than one non-FIFA nationality.

No.	Pos.	Nation	Player
5	DF	RUS	Aleksandr Dovbnya (on loan to Rotor Volgograd)
26	DF	BFA	Bakary Koné
30	FW	ROU	Alexandru Tudorie (on loan to (Romania) Voluntari)
41	DF	RUS	Dmitri Peshcherov
43	DF	RUS	Mikhail Ryzhov
45	DF	RUS	Tamerlan Kuchiyev
46	MF	RUS	Alan Koroyev
54	MF	RUS	Timur Dudayti (to Ryazan)
57	MF	RUS	Ilya Bykovsky (to Ural Yekaterinburg)
60	FW	RUS	Tamerlan Musayev (to Baltika Kaliningrad)
87	MF	RUS	Ivan Alekseyev (to Zvezda St. Petersburg)
88	MF	RUS	Yuri Petrovskiy (to Zorky Krasnogorsk)
92	MF	RUS	Ivan Borsyakov
93	FW	RUS	Yegor Denisov (to Metallurg Lipetsk)
97	FW	RUS	Alan Mistulov

=== CSKA Moscow ===
In: Note: Flags indicate national team as defined under FIFA eligibility rules; some limited exceptions apply. Players may hold more than one non-FIFA nationality.

No.	Pos.	Nation	Player
13	DF	RUS	Nikita Kotin (from Krylia Sovetov Samara)
33	GK	RUS	Nikolai Radchenko (October 2019)
41	MF	RUS	Yegor Ushakov (from Torpedo Moscow academy)
43	MF	RUS	Aleksei Pilipenko (from own academy)
45	GK	RUS	Danila Bokov (from own academy)
46	FW	RUS	Vladislav Yakovlev (from own academy, October 2019)
64	MF	RUS	Ruslan Daurov (from Spartak Vladikavkaz, October 2019)
92	DF	RUS	Aleksei Sukharev (free agent, last with Avangard Kursk)
93	DF	RUS	Sergei Kochetkov (from own academy)
99	FW	BLR	Ilya Shkurin (from (Belarus) Dynamo Brest)

Out: Note: Flags indicate national team as defined under FIFA eligibility rules; some limited exceptions apply. Players may hold more than one non-FIFA nationality.

No.	Pos.	Nation	Player
11	MF	BRA	Lucas Santos (end on loan from (Brazil) Vasco da Gama)
15	MF	RUS	Dmitry Yefremov (to Ural Yekaterinburg)
19	FW	JPN	Takuma Nishimura (on loan to (Portugal) Portimonense)
31	DF	CRO	Zvonimir Šarlija (end of loan from (Croatia) Slaven Belupo)
45	FW	RUS	Timur Osmolovskiy (October 2019)
52	MF	RUS	Siyovush Khabibulloyev (to Sochi)
54	DF	RUS	Danil Savinykh (contract expired)
58	MF	RUS	Kirill Shekhov (to Arsenal Tula)
67	DF	RUS	Konstantin Yerokhin (to Urozhay Krasnodar)
68	DF	RUS	Nikita Abramushkin (to Inter Cherkessk)
71	MF	RUS	Nayair Tiknizyan (on loan to Avangard Kursk)
72	MF	RUS	Astemir Gordyushenko (to Torpedo Moscow)
84	MF	RUS	Khasan Tashayev (to Sochi, October 2019)
85	MF	RUS	Danila Yanov (to (Latvia) Riga)
95	GK	RUS	Maksim Yedapin (to Tyumen)

=== Dynamo Moscow ===
In: Note: Flags indicate national team as defined under FIFA eligibility rules; some limited exceptions apply. Players may hold more than one non-FIFA nationality.

No.	Pos.	Nation	Player
19	MF	RUS	Vladimir Moskvichyov (end of loan to Orenburg)
21	DF	RUS	Dmitri Skopintsev (from Krasnodar)
27	FW	RUS	Nikolay Komlichenko (from (Czech Republic) Mladá Boleslav)
47	MF	RUS	Arsen Zakharyan (from own academy)
95	GK	RUS	Rasul Mitsayev (from Akhmat Grozny academy)

Out: Note: Flags indicate national team as defined under FIFA eligibility rules; some limited exceptions apply. Players may hold more than one non-FIFA nationality.

No.	Pos.	Nation	Player
7	MF	POR	Miguel Cardoso (on loan to Tambov)
13	DF	RUS	Ihor Kalinin (on loan to Ural Yekaterinburg)
20	MF	RUS	Vyacheslav Grulyov (on loan to Nizhny Novgorod)
73	DF	RUS	Kirill Glushchenkov (to Fakel Voronezh)
79	DF	RUS	Sergei Slepov
90	FW	RUS	Nikolay Obolsky (on loan to Nizhny Novgorod)
97	MF	RUS	Valentin Zekhov (to (Slovenia) Celje)
98	GK	RUS	Ilya Kuptsov
99	FW	AZE	Ramil Sheydayev (to (Azerbaijan) Sabah)

=== Krasnodar ===
In: Note: Flags indicate national team as defined under FIFA eligibility rules; some limited exceptions apply. Players may hold more than one non-FIFA nationality.

No.	Pos.	Nation	Player
2	DF	RUS	Yegor Sorokin (end of loan to Rubin Kazan)
79	DF	RUS	Mamma Mammayev
85	MF	RUS	Mikhail Strelnik (from Strogino Moscow)
87	MF	RUS	Anatoli Katrich (from Luch Vladivostok)
90	GK	RUS	Nikita Yegyazarov
91	MF	RUS	Roman Zashchepkin (from own academy, October 2019)

Out: Note: Flags indicate national team as defined under FIFA eligibility rules; some limited exceptions apply. Players may hold more than one non-FIFA nationality.

No.	Pos.	Nation	Player
11	DF	RUS	Dmitri Skopintsev (to Dynamo Moscow)
17	FW	RUS	Ivan Ignatyev (to Rubin Kazan)
21	FW	DEN	Younes Namli (on loan to (United States) Colorado Rapids)
22	DF	RUS	Ivan Taranov (released)
79	MF	RUS	Igor Yurchenko (October 2019)
85	FW	RUS	Stepan Komar
87	FW	RUS	Arutyun Grigoryan (on loan to (Czech Republic) Mladá Boleslav)
—	DF	RUS	Aleksei Tatayev (to (Czech Republic) Mladá Boleslav, previously on loan)
—	MF	PER	Christian Cueva (to (Brazil) Santos, previously on loan)
—	MF	RUS	Oleg Lanin (to Yenisey Krasnoyarsk, previously on loan)

=== Krylia Sovetov Samara ===
In: Note: Flags indicate national team as defined under FIFA eligibility rules; some limited exceptions apply. Players may hold more than one non-FIFA nationality.

No.	Pos.	Nation	Player
7	MF	IRQ	Safaa Hadi (from (Iraq) Al-Shorta)
11	MF	SLO	Denis Popović (from (Switzerland) Zürich)
15	MF	RUS	Maksim Glushenkov (on loan from Spartak Moscow)
18	DF	ALG	Mehdi Zeffane (free agent)
30	MF	RUS	Sergei Ivanov (on loan from Zenit St. Petersburg)
39	GK	RUS	Yevgeny Frolov (from Sochi)
64	FW	RUS	Daniil Smetsky
65	MF	RUS	Klim Salmin
66	DF	RUS	Kirill Lomakin
67	DF	RUS	Roman Yermakov
68	FW	RUS	Aleksei Voychenko (from Konoplyov football academy)
72	DF	RUS	Yegor Aleksandrov
73	MF	RUS	Artyom Bulgakov
74	MF	BLR	Vladimir Medved (from Rostov)

Out: Note: Flags indicate national team as defined under FIFA eligibility rules; some limited exceptions apply. Players may hold more than one non-FIFA nationality.

No.	Pos.	Nation	Player
6	MF	RUS	Denis Yakuba (on loan to Chertanovo Moscow)
7	FW	RUS	Aleksandr Sobolev (on loan to Spartak Moscow)
14	MF	MDA	Radu Gînsari (on loan to (Israel) Ironi Kiryat Shmona)
47	DF	RUS	Aleksei Karasyov
53	DF	RUS	Nikita Kotin (to CSKA Moscow)
59	MF	RUS	Konstantin Shamayev
78	MF	RUS	Gennadi Kiselyov (on loan to Rotor Volgograd)
87	DF	RUS	Ilya Kotkin
91	FW	RUS	Andrei Syreskin
92	MF	RUS	Pavel Tsvetkov
93	FW	RUS	Artyom Tashchyan
96	MF	RUS	Vyacheslav Baranov
—	DF	RUS	Kirill Gotsuk (to Nizhny Novgorod, previously on loan to Avangard Kursk)

=== Lokomotiv Moscow ===
In: Note: Flags indicate national team as defined under FIFA eligibility rules; some limited exceptions apply. Players may hold more than one non-FIFA nationality.

No.	Pos.	Nation	Player
42	DF	RUS	Lev Ushakhin (from own academy)
49	MF	RUS	Grigory Borisenko (from own academy)
51	DF	RUS	Kirill Kiryanin (from own academy)
57	FW	RUS	Matvei Pershin (from own academy)
71	MF	RUS	Maksim Aktisov (from Spartak Moscow)
72	DF	RUS	Artyom Chakrygin
87	MF	RUS	Aleksiy Kostyuk (from Znamya Noginsk)

Out: Note: Flags indicate national team as defined under FIFA eligibility rules; some limited exceptions apply. Players may hold more than one non-FIFA nationality.

No.	Pos.	Nation	Player
9	FW	RUS	Fyodor Smolov (on loan to (Spain) Celta Vigo)
41	MF	RUS	Mikhail Maltsev (to Rodina Moscow)
51	GK	RUS	Vitali Botnar (to Torpedo Moscow)
72	DF	RUS	Nikita Zhyoltikov (to Strogino Moscow)
87	DF	RUS	Artyom Sukhanov (to Arsenal Tula)
95	DF	RUS	German Osnov (to Akron Tolyatti)
99	FW	RUS	Nikita Frasinyuk (October 2019)
—	FW	RUS	Artyom Galadzhan (on loan to Rotor Volgograd, previously on loan to Orenburg)

=== Orenburg ===
In: Note: Flags indicate national team as defined under FIFA eligibility rules; some limited exceptions apply. Players may hold more than one non-FIFA nationality.

No.	Pos.	Nation	Player
14	FW	SEN	Mamadou Sylla (from (Belgium) Gent)
23	MF	KAZ	Islambek Kuat (from (Kazakhstan) Kairat)
46	FW	RUS	Rim Yegofarov
55	MF	RUS	Kirill Kaplenko (on loan from Zenit St. Petersburg)
71	MF	RUS	Ilya Yashin
72	MF	RUS	Ruzel Garipov

Out: Note: Flags indicate national team as defined under FIFA eligibility rules; some limited exceptions apply. Players may hold more than one non-FIFA nationality.

No.	Pos.	Nation	Player
19	MF	RUS	Vladimir Moskvichyov (end of loan from Dynamo Moscow)
29	MF	UZB	Vadim Afonin (to (Uzbekistan) Lokomotiv Tashkent)
76	MF	RUS	David Bidlovskiy (on loan to Urozhay Krasnodar)
77	MF	RUS	Nikita Malyarov (to Khimki)
89	FW	RUS	Artyom Galadzhan (end of loan from Lokomotiv Moscow)

=== Rostov ===
In: Note: Flags indicate national team as defined under FIFA eligibility rules; some limited exceptions apply. Players may hold more than one non-FIFA nationality.

No.	Pos.	Nation	Player
10	MF	RUS	Pavel Mamayev (free agent, last at (Russia) Krasnodar)
49	DF	RUS	Bogdan Rogochiy
55	DF	RUS	Maksim Osipenko (from Tambov)
65	DF	RUS	Timofey Kalistratov
71	MF	RUS	Kirill Girnyk
77	GK	RUS	Maksim Rudakov (from Zenit St. Petersburg)
82	MF	RUS	Maksim Stavtsev
83	FW	RUS	Bogdan Chinaryov (from Krylia Sovetov Samara academy)
87	MF	RUS	Andrei Langovich
94	GK	RUS	Vadim Lukyanov

Out: Note: Flags indicate national team as defined under FIFA eligibility rules; some limited exceptions apply. Players may hold more than one non-FIFA nationality.

No.	Pos.	Nation	Player
3	DF	POL	Maciej Wilusz (to Ural Yekaterinburg)
6	DF	ISL	Ragnar Sigurðsson (to (Denmark) Copenhagen)
9	FW	ISL	Björn Bergmann Sigurðarson (on loan to (Cyprus) APOEL)
20	MF	BLR	Vladimir Medved (to Krylia Sovetov Samara)
22	DF	RUS	Kirill Malyarov
49	MF	RUS	Konstantin Baydak
67	MF	RUS	Bogdan Mikhaylichenko
71	MF	RUS	Dmitri Veber (to Veles Moscow)
95	DF	RUS	Kirill Romanov
—	MF	SWE	Anton Salétros (on loan to (Norway) Sarpsborg 08, previously on loan to (Sweden) AIK)
—	FW	ISL	Viðar Örn Kjartansson (on loan to (Turkey) Yeni Malatyaspor, previously on loan to Rubin Kazan)

=== Rubin Kazan ===
In: Note: Flags indicate national team as defined under FIFA eligibility rules; some limited exceptions apply. Players may hold more than one non-FIFA nationality.

No.	Pos.	Nation	Player
8	MF	SUI	Darko Jevtić (from (Poland) Lech Poznań)
15	MF	RUS	Dmitri Tarasov (free agent)
19	FW	RUS	Ivan Ignatyev (from Krasnodar)
25	MF	RUS	Denis Makarov (from Neftekhimik Nizhnekamsk)
27	DF	BRA	Pablo (on loan from (Portugal) Braga)
28	MF	DEN	Oliver Abildgaard (on loan from (Denmark) AaB)
31	DF	RUS	Emil Gallyamov (from own academy)
36	MF	RUS	Danil Sharafutdinov
40	FW	TJK	Shahrom Samiyev (from (Tajikistan) Istiklol)
42	DF	RUS	Saveli Ratnikov
43	FW	RUS	Danila Yezhkov
45	DF	RUS	Aleksandr Ivankov (from Zorky Krasnogorsk)
73	FW	RUS	Oleg Kretsul
77	DF	RUS	Ilya Samoshnikov (from Torpedo Moscow)
87	MF	RUS	Soltmurad Bakayev (from Spartak Moscow)

Out: Note: Flags indicate national team as defined under FIFA eligibility rules; some limited exceptions apply. Players may hold more than one non-FIFA nationality.

No.	Pos.	Nation	Player
6	MF	RUS	Yevgeni Bashkirov (to (Poland) Zagłębie Lubin)
8	FW	ISL	Viðar Örn Kjartansson (end of loan from Rostov)
26	MF	GEO	Beka Mikeltadze (on loan to Rotor Volgograd)
29	DF	UZB	Vitaliy Denisov (to Rotor Volgograd)
47	DF	RUS	Dmitri Gubanov
51	DF	RUS	Ilya Agapov (on loan to Neftekhimik Nizhnekamsk)
52	MF	RUS	Denis Fedorochev (October 2019)
63	FW	RUS	Nikita Saprunov (to Dynamo Bryansk)
67	DF	RUS	Aleksandr Smelov (to Arsenal Tula)
70	FW	RUS	Nikolai Kipiani (on loan to Rotor Volgograd)
77	MF	RUS	Roman Akbashev (to Neftekhimik Nizhnekamsk)
80	DF	RUS	Yegor Sorokin (end of loan from Krasnodar)
85	MF	RUS	Artur Maksimchuk (to Saturn Ramenskoye)
99	MF	RUS	Kamil Zakirov (on loan to Volgar Astrakhan)

=== Sochi ===
In: Note: Flags indicate national team as defined under FIFA eligibility rules; some limited exceptions apply. Players may hold more than one non-FIFA nationality.

No.	Pos.	Nation	Player
23	DF	FRA	Adil Rami (from (Turkey) Fenerbahçe)
27	DF	RUS	Kirill Zaika (return after injury)
42	MF	NGR	Muhammad Ladan (October 2019)
47	MF	RUS	Artyom Terentyev
48	DF	RUS	Siyovush Khabibulloyev (from CSKA Moscow)
53	MF	RUS	Daniil Pavlov (last with Arsenal Tula, October 2019)
62	MF	NGR	Philip Ipole (October 2019)
67	DF	RUS	Lev Akulov (from Dynamo Moscow academy, October 2019)
69	MF	RUS	Khasan Tashayev (from CSKA Moscow, October 2019)
71	GK	RUS	Aleksandr Dyachenko (October 2019)
91	FW	RUS	Aleksandr Kokorin (on loan from Zenit Saint Petersburg)
95	MF	COD	Giannelli Imbula (from (England) Stoke City)
99	FW	RUS	Viktor Morozov (from Akademiya Futbola Krasnodar)
—	MF	ARM	Erik Vardanyan (from (Armenia) Pyunik)

Out: Note: Flags indicate national team as defined under FIFA eligibility rules; some limited exceptions apply. Players may hold more than one non-FIFA nationality.

No.	Pos.	Nation	Player
13	DF	RUS	Fyodor Kudryashov (to (Turkey) Antalyaspor)
19	GK	RUS	Yevgeny Frolov (to Krylia Sovetov Samara)
20	DF	RUS	Igor Yurganov (on loan to Tambov)
47	DF	RUS	Roman Kvataniya
52	DF	RUS	Vadim Ivlev
53	DF	RUS	Sergei Voropayev (October 2019)
57	MF	RUS	Viktor Gryazin
67	MF	RUS	Vikenti Shchipachyov (October 2019)
69	MF	RUS	Luchano Bobrov (to Strogino Moscow)
71	GK	RUS	Yegor Kabakov (October 2019)
76	FW	RUS	Ilya Predeus

=== Spartak Moscow ===
In: Note: Flags indicate national team as defined under FIFA eligibility rules; some limited exceptions apply. Players may hold more than one non-FIFA nationality.

No.	Pos.	Nation	Player
4	MF	RUS	Nikolai Tyunin
17	DF	RUS	Georgi Tigiyev (end of loan to (Belarus) Dinamo Minsk)
41	MF	RUS	Mark Krotov
49	DF	RUS	Roman Shishkin (from Torpedo Moscow)
53	GK	RUS	Ilyas Muminov (from Zvezda-2 St. Petersburg)
55	DF	RUS	Vitali Dyakov (free agent)
62	DF	RUS	Vyacheslav Frolov
64	MF	RUS	Daniil Grigoryev
77	FW	RUS	Aleksandr Sobolev (on loan from Krylia Sovetov Samara)
90	MF	RUS	Konstantin Shiltsov (from UOR #5 Yegoryevsk)
96	DF	RUS	Nikolay Genchu (from own academy)

Out: Note: Flags indicate national team as defined under FIFA eligibility rules; some limited exceptions apply. Players may hold more than one non-FIFA nationality.

No.	Pos.	Nation	Player
15	MF	RUS	Maksim Glushenkov (on loan to Krylia Sovetov Samara)
17	MF	RUS	Soltmurad Bakayev (to Rubin Kazan)
49	MF	GEO	Jano Ananidze (to (Cyprus) Anorthosis Famagusta)
69	MF	RUS	Dmitri Mitroga
79	FW	RUS	Aleksandr Rudenko (on loan to Torpedo Moscow)
86	GK	RUS	Artyom Poplevchenkov
96	DF	RUS	Maksim Aktisov (to Lokomotiv Moscow)
—	FW	BRA	Pedro Rocha (on loan to (Brazil) Flamengo, previously on loan to (Brazil) Cruzeiro)

=== Tambov ===
In: Note: Flags indicate national team as defined under FIFA eligibility rules; some limited exceptions apply. Players may hold more than one non-FIFA nationality.

No.	Pos.	Nation	Player
4	FW	NGR	Fanen Akyam (free agent)
5	DF	RUS	Yevgeni Shlyakov (end of loan to SKA-Khabarovsk)
6	MF	CIV	Geo Danny Ekra (free agent)
7	MF	POR	Miguel Cardoso (on loan from Dynamo Moscow)
11	FW	RUS	Artyom Fedchuk (from Avangard Kursk)
12	GK	UKR	Dmytro Kosiakov (from (Georgia (country)) Merani Tbilisi academy)
15	DF	RUS	Oleksandr Filin (on loan from Khimki)
22	DF	RUS	Igor Yurganov (on loan from Sochi)
29	DF	UKR	Oleksandr Kapliyenko (from (Georgia (country)) Dinamo Tbilisi)
34	DF	UKR	Anton Fedorenko (from (Georgia (country)) Merani Tbilisi academy)
55	DF	UKR	Denis Romashev (from (Georgia (country)) Merani Tbilisi academy)
66	MF	RUS	Daniil Mishutin
73	GK	RUS	Nikita Chagrov (from Avangard Kursk)
96	FW	RUS	Mikhail Usanin
—	FW	RUS	Yevgeni Ragulkin (end of loan to Tyumen)

Out: Note: Flags indicate national team as defined under FIFA eligibility rules; some limited exceptions apply. Players may hold more than one non-FIFA nationality.

No.	Pos.	Nation	Player
6	MF	RUS	Vladislav Kulik (to Chayka Peschanokopskoye)
7	MF	RUS	Oleg Chernyshov (on loan to (Kazakhstan) Aktobe)
11	MF	NGR	Benito (to (Ukraine) Dynamo Kyiv)
14	FW	RUS	Khyzyr Appayev (to Tekstilshchik Ivanovo)
15	MF	NGR	Mohammed Usman (to (Kazakhstan) Shakhter Karagandy)
23	MF	RUS	Danil Klyonkin (to Neftekhimik Nizhnekamsk)
48	FW	RUS	Andrei Chasovskikh (on loan to (Kazakhstan) Aktobe)
50	GK	RUS	Vladimir Sugrobov (on loan to (Armenia) Pyunik)
55	DF	RUS	Maksim Osipenko (to Rostov)
79	MF	RUS	Igor Sichkar

=== Ufa ===
In: Note: Flags indicate national team as defined under FIFA eligibility rules; some limited exceptions apply. Players may hold more than one non-FIFA nationality.

No.	Pos.	Nation	Player
6	MF	UZB	Oston Urunov (from (Uzbekistan) Lokomotiv Tashkent)
19	FW	RUS	Gamid Agalarov (from Anzhi Makhachkala)
47	MF	RUS	Artyom Yegorov (November 2019)
71	GK	RUS	Maksim Vafiyev
87	DF	RUS	Vladimir Yeliseyev
90	MF	RUS	Danil Yevsyukov (October 2019)

Out: Note: Flags indicate national team as defined under FIFA eligibility rules; some limited exceptions apply. Players may hold more than one non-FIFA nationality.

No.	Pos.	Nation	Player
30	GK	RUS	Gleb Yefimov (to (Belarus) Gorodeya)

=== Ural Yekaterinburg ===
In: Note: Flags indicate national team as defined under FIFA eligibility rules; some limited exceptions apply. Players may hold more than one non-FIFA nationality.

No.	Pos.	Nation	Player
5	DF	POL	Maciej Wilusz (from Rostov)
11	MF	RUS	Dmitry Yefremov (from CSKA Moscow)
22	MF	RUS	Aykhan Guseynov (from Nizhny Novgorod)
25	DF	RUS	Ivan Kuzmichyov (from Lada-Tolyatti)
35	DF	BLR	Nikolay Zolotov (from (Belarus) Vitebsk)
50	DF	RUS	Ilya Nasonkin (from Rotor-2 Volgograd)
62	GK	RUS	Davyd Alekseyev
65	MF	RUS	Aleksandr Galimov (end of loan to (Armenia) Pyunik)
82	FW	RUS	Danil Vorobyov
84	DF	RUS	Arsen Agakhanov
94	MF	RUS	Ilya Bykovsky (from Arsenal Tula)
95	DF	RUS	Ihor Kalinin (on loan from Dynamo Moscow)
97	DF	RUS	Andrei Khityayev
99	FW	RUS	Yevgeni Tatarinov (end of loan to Torpedo Moscow)

Out: Note: Flags indicate national team as defined under FIFA eligibility rules; some limited exceptions apply. Players may hold more than one non-FIFA nationality.

No.	Pos.	Nation	Player
11	FW	RUS	Vladimir Ilyin (to Akhmat Grozny)
26	DF	RUS	Mingiyan Beveyev (to KAMAZ Naberezhnye Chelny)
40	DF	RUS	Maksim Gorin
50	DF	RUS	Nikita Chistyakov (on loan to Chayka Peschanokopskoye)
59	MF	RUS	Sergei Serchenkov (to Rotor Volgograd)
62	MF	RUS	Danil Khoroshev
82	FW	RUS	Sergei Akhipovsky
84	MF	RUS	Danila Kushtin
85	MF	RUS	Danil Davletshin
87	MF	RUS	Eduard Valiakhmetov (to Chelyabinsk)

=== Zenit Saint Petersburg ===
In: Note: Flags indicate national team as defined under FIFA eligibility rules; some limited exceptions apply. Players may hold more than one non-FIFA nationality.

No.	Pos.	Nation	Player
10	MF	ARG	Emiliano Rigoni (end of loan to (Italy) Sampdoria)
43	DF	RUS	Aleksandr Boldyrev (from own academy)
48	FW	RUS	Viktor Kozyrev (from own academy)
49	GK	RUS	David Byazrov (from own academy)
52	FW	RUS	Kirill Fateyev (from own academy)
59	FW	RUS	Yegor Krupenin (from own academy)
73	MF	RUS	Roman Galkin (from own academy)
74	FW	RUS	Nikita Tereshchuk (from own academy)
75	DF	RUS	Sergei Chibisov
82	FW	RUS	Ivan Tarasov (end of loan to (Finland) HJK)
98	MF	RUS	Anton Bugorsky (from own academy)

Out: Note: Flags indicate national team as defined under FIFA eligibility rules; some limited exceptions apply. Players may hold more than one non-FIFA nationality.

No.	Pos.	Nation	Player
20	MF	SVK	Róbert Mak (to (Turkey) Konyaspor)
32	MF	ARG	Matías Kranevitter (to (Mexico) Monterrey)
34	DF	RUS	Sergei Zuykov (to Nizhny Novgorod)
47	FW	RUS	Kirill Kosarev (end of loan from Murom)
50	DF	RUS	Vladislav Molchan (on loan to Yenisey Krasnoyarsk)
55	MF	RUS	Kirill Kaplenko (on loan to Orenburg)
57	DF	RUS	Gleb Zakharov (end of loan from Yenisey Krasnoyarsk)
59	DF	RUS	Sergei Bugriyev (to Tom Tomsk)
69	DF	BLR	Dmitri Prischepa (end of loan from (Belarus) Minsk)
70	MF	RUS	Artyom Maksimenko (end of loan from Nizhny Novgorod)
72	DF	RUS	Anton Sinyak (on loan to Tom Tomsk)
74	MF	RUS	Sergei Ivanov (on loan to Krylia Sovetov Samara)
82	GK	RUS	Ivan Kukushkin (on loan to Zvezda St. Petersburg)
—	GK	RUS	Maksim Rudakov (to Rostov, previously on loan to (Finland) HJK)
—	FW	RUS	Aleksandr Kokorin (on loan to Sochi)
