= 2020 Match Premier Cup =

Friendly association football tournament played in the Qatar

Tournament details
- Host country: Qatar
- Dates: February 1–9
- Teams: 4 (from 1 confederation)
- Venue(s): 1 (in 1 host city)

Final positions
- Champions: (Russia) Spartak Moscow (2nd title)

Tournament statistics
- Matches played: 6
- Goals scored: 22 (3.67 per match)
- Top scorer(s): (Russia) Pavel Mamayev (Russia) Reziuan Mirzov (2 goals)

The 2020 Match Premier Cup was third edition of Match Premier Cup, a friendly association football tournament played in the Qatar.

== Teams ==
Nation	Team	Location	Confederation	League
Russia	Spartak Moscow	Moscow	UEFA	Russian Premier League
Russia	Rostov	Rostov-on-Don	UEFA	Russian Premier League
Russia	Lokomotiv Moscow	Moscow	UEFA	Russian Premier League
Serbia	FK Partizan	Belgrade	UEFA	Serbian SuperLiga

== Standings ==
Pos	Team	Pld	W	PW	PL	L	GF	GA	GD	Pts	Final result
1	(Russia) Spartak Moscow (C)	3	2	0	1	0	6	4	+2	7	Match Premier Cup winners
2	(Russia) Lokomotiv Moscow	3	0	2	1	0	5	5	0	5	
3	(Russia) Rostov	3	1	0	1	1	5	8	−3	4	
4	(Serbia) FK Partizan	3	0	1	0	2	4	7	−3	2	

Source: Match Premier Cup
Rules for classification: 1) Points; 2) Wins; 3) Goal differential; 4) Goals scored; 5) Head-to-head result; 6) Disciplinary points.
(C) Champion

== Matches ==
February 1, 2020
13:00

Lokomotiv Moscow (Russia)	1–1	(Serbia) FK Partizan
Eder 31'	Report	Tošić 34'
Penalties
João Mário (penalty scored); Tugarev (penalty missed); Rybus (penalty missed); Eder (penalty scored)	2–4	Marković (penalty scored); Zdjelar (penalty scored); Matić (penalty scored); Stevanović (penalty scored)

Aspire Dome, Doha
Referee: Khamis Al-Kuwari
February 1, 2020
17:00

Spartak Moscow (Russia)	2–1	(Russia) Rostov
Mirzov 50', 75'	Report	Hadžikadunić 89'

Aspire Dome, Doha

February 4, 2020
18:00

FK Partizan (Serbia)	1–3	(Russia) Rostov
Sadiq 87' (pen.)	Report	Mamayev 32'; Dolgov 57'; Shomurodov 73'

Aspire Dome, Doha

February 5, 2020
18:00

Spartak Moscow (Russia)	1–1	(Russia) Lokomotiv Moscow
Gaponov 48'	Report	Ignatyev 27'
Penalties
Ayrton Lucas (penalty scored); Glushenkov (penalty missed); Král (penalty missed); Mirzov (penalty scored)	2–4	Miranchuk (penalty scored); Zhemaletdinov (penalty scored); Höwedes (penalty missed); Krychowiak (penalty scored); Barinov (penalty scored)

Aspire Dome, Doha

February 8, 2020
14:00

Spartak Moscow (Russia)	3–2	(Serbia) FK Partizan
Zobnin 7'; Sobolev 48'; Ponce 70' (pen.)	Report	Pavlović 16'; Souma 34'

Aspire Dome, Doha

February 9, 2020
18:00

Rostov (Russia)	3–3	(Russia) Lokomotiv Moscow
Osipenko 42'; Mamayev 50'; Eremenko 71'	Report	Murilo 19'; Krychowiak 61'; Rybchinsky 74'
Penalties
Popov (penalty scored); Chernov (penalty missed); Osipov (penalty scored); Saplinov (penalty scored); Hadžikadunić (penalty scored); Kozhemyakin (penalty missed)	4–5	Ignatyev (penalty scored); Krychowiak (penalty scored); Barinov (penalty scored); Kolomeytsev (penalty missed); Kulikov (penalty scored); Rybchinsky (penalty scored)

Aspire Dome, Doha
