= Alexey Kornienko =

Alexey Kornienko may refer to:

- Alexei Kornienko (born 1954), Austrian conductor and pianist
- Aleksey Kornienko (born 2003), Russian footballer
- Alexey Kornienko (politician) (born 1976), Russian politician
