= Denis Popov =

Denis Popov may refer to:

- Denis Popov (footballer, born 1979), Russian footballer and football coach
- Denis Popov (footballer, born 2002), Russian football goalkeeper

== See also ==
- Denys Popov (born 1999), Ukrainian footballer
