= Danila Proshlyakov =

Russian footballer (born 2000)

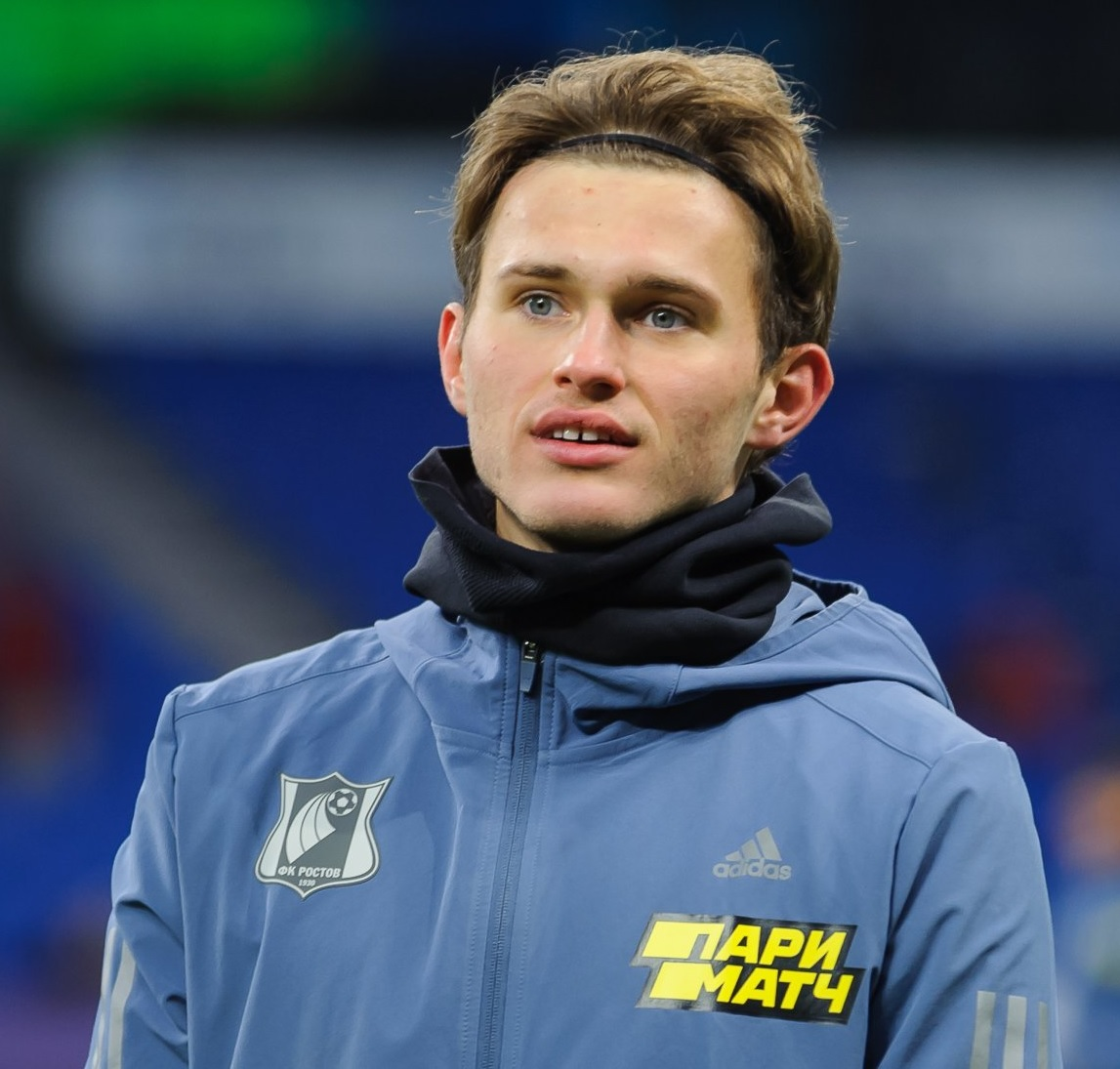
- Proshlyakov with FC Rostov in 2019

Personal information
- Full name: Danila Denisovich Proshlyakov
- Date of birth: 8 March 2000 (age 26)
- Place of birth: Moscow, Russia
- Height: 1.87 m (6 ft 2 in)
- Position: Forward

Youth career
- 2006–2012: FC Torpedo Moscow
- 2012–2015: FC Spartak Moscow
- 2015–2016: FC Chertanovo Moscow
- 2016–2019: FC Spartak Moscow

Senior career*
Years	Team	Apps	(Gls)
2018–2019	FC Spartak-2 Moscow	7	(0)
2018	FC Spartak Moscow	0	(0)
2019–2022	FC Rostov	7	(0)
2020	→ FC Torpedo Moscow (loan)	10	(1)
2021	→ FC Veles Moscow (loan)	5	(0)
2022–2023	FC Saturn Ramenskoye	26	(8)
2023–2025	FC 2DROTS Moscow (amateur)		

International career^{‡}
2017–2018	Russia U-18	4	(1)
2018–2019	Russia U-19	6	(1)
- * Club domestic league appearances and goals as of 5 August 2025 ‡ National team caps and goals as of 26 March 2019

Danila Denisovich Proshlyakov (Russian: Данила Денисович Прошляков; born 8 March 2000) is a Russian football player who plays as a centre-forward.

== Club career ==
He made his debut in the Russian Football National League for FC Spartak-2 Moscow on 17 July 2018 in a game against PFC Sochi.

On 11 July 2019, he signed a 4-year contract with FC Rostov. He made his Russian Premier League debut for Rostov on 9 March 2020 in a game against PFC CSKA Moscow, he substituted Eldor Shomurodov in the 90th minute.

On 18 August 2020 he joined FC Torpedo Moscow on loan for the 2020–21 season. On 29 December 2020, Torpedo terminated the loan. On 12 January 2021, he joined FC Veles Moscow on loan until the end of the 2020–21 season.

== Career statistics ==
As of 21 May 2022

Club	Season	League			Cup		Continental		Other		Total	
Club	Season	Division	Apps	Goals	Apps	Goals	Apps	Goals	Apps	Goals	Apps	Goals
Spartak-2 Moscow	2018–19	FNL	7	0	–		–		3 (Note: Appearances in the FNL Cup)	0	10	0
Spartak Moscow	2018–19	RPL	0	0	0	0	0	0	–		0	0
Rostov	2019–20	RPL	7	0	0	0	–		–		7	0
Rostov	2020–21	RPL	0	0	–		–		–		0	0
Rostov	2021–22	RPL	0	0	0	0	–		–		0	0
Rostov	Total		7	0	0	0	0	0	0	0	7	0
Torpedo Moscow (loan)	2020–21	FNL	10	1	1	0	–		–		11	1
Veles Moscow (loan)	2020–21	FNL	5	0	–		–		–		5	0
Career total			29	1	1	0	0	0	3	0	33	1
