= 2019 Match Premier Cup (summer) =

Friendly association football tournament played in the Austria

Tournament details
- Host country: Austria
- Dates: June 26 – July 4
- Teams: 4 (from 1 confederation)
- Venue: 1 (in 1 host city)

Final positions
- Champions: FC Krasnodar (1st title)

Tournament statistics
- Matches played: 6
- Goals scored: 16 (2.67 per match)
- Top scorer(s): (Uzbekistan) Eldor Shomurodov (Russia) Zelimkhan Bakayev (Brazil) Ari (2 goals each)

The 2019 Match Premier Cup was the second edition of Match Premier Cup, a friendly association football tournament played in Austria.

== Teams ==
Nation	Team	Location	Confederation	League
Russia	CSKA Moscow	Moscow	UEFA	Russian Premier League
Russia	Spartak Moscow	Moscow	UEFA	Russian Premier League
Russia	Rostov	Rostov-on-Don	UEFA	Russian Premier League
Russia	Krasnodar	Krasnodar	UEFA	Russian Premier League

== Standings ==
Pos	Team	Pld	W	PW	PL	L	GF	GA	GD	Pts	Final result
1	(Russia) Krasnodar (C)	3	3	0	0	0	6	1	+5	9	Match Premier Cup winners
2	(Russia) Rostov	3	2	0	0	1	4	4	0	6	
3	(Russia) Spartak Moscow	3	1	0	0	2	4	5	−1	3	
4	(Russia) CSKA Moscow	3	0	0	0	3	2	6	−4	0	

Source: Match Premier Cup
Rules for classification: 1) Points; 2) Wins; 3) Goal differential; 4) Goals scored; 5) Head-to-head result; 6) Disciplinary points.
(C) Champion

== Matches ==
June 26, 2019
19:00

Rostov (Russia)	2–0	(Russia) Spartak Moscow
Poloz 3'; Saplinov 32'	Report

Sportplatz TSV Pöllau, Pöllau bei Hartberg

June 27, 2019
19:00

Krasnodar (Russia)	1–0	(Russia) CSKA Moscow
Martynovich 45+1'	Report

Sportplatz TSV Pöllau, Pöllau bei Hartberg

June 30, 2019
11:30

FC Krasnodar (Russia)	3–0	(Russia) Rostov
Ari 38' (pen.); Utkin 61'; Khalnazarov 84'	Report

Sportplatz TSV Pöllau, Pöllau bei Hartberg
June 30, 2019
19:00

Spartak Moscow (Russia)	3–1	(Russia) CSKA Moscow
Bakayev 7'; Gaponov 59'; Hanni 60'	Report	Lomovitsky 27' (o.g.)

Sportplatz TSV Pöllau, Pöllau bei Hartberg

July 3, 2019
19:00

CSKA Moscow (Russia)	1–2	(Russia) FC Rostov
Chalov 28'	Report	Shomurodov 9', 44'

Sportplatz TSV Pöllau, Pöllau bei Hartberg

July 4, 2019
19:00

Spartak Moscow (Russia)	1–2	(Russia) FC Krasnodar
Bakayev 63'	Report	Kambolov 38'; Ari 64'

Sportplatz TSV Pöllau, Pöllau bei Hartberg
