= Aleksandr Dolgov =

Russian footballer (born 1998)

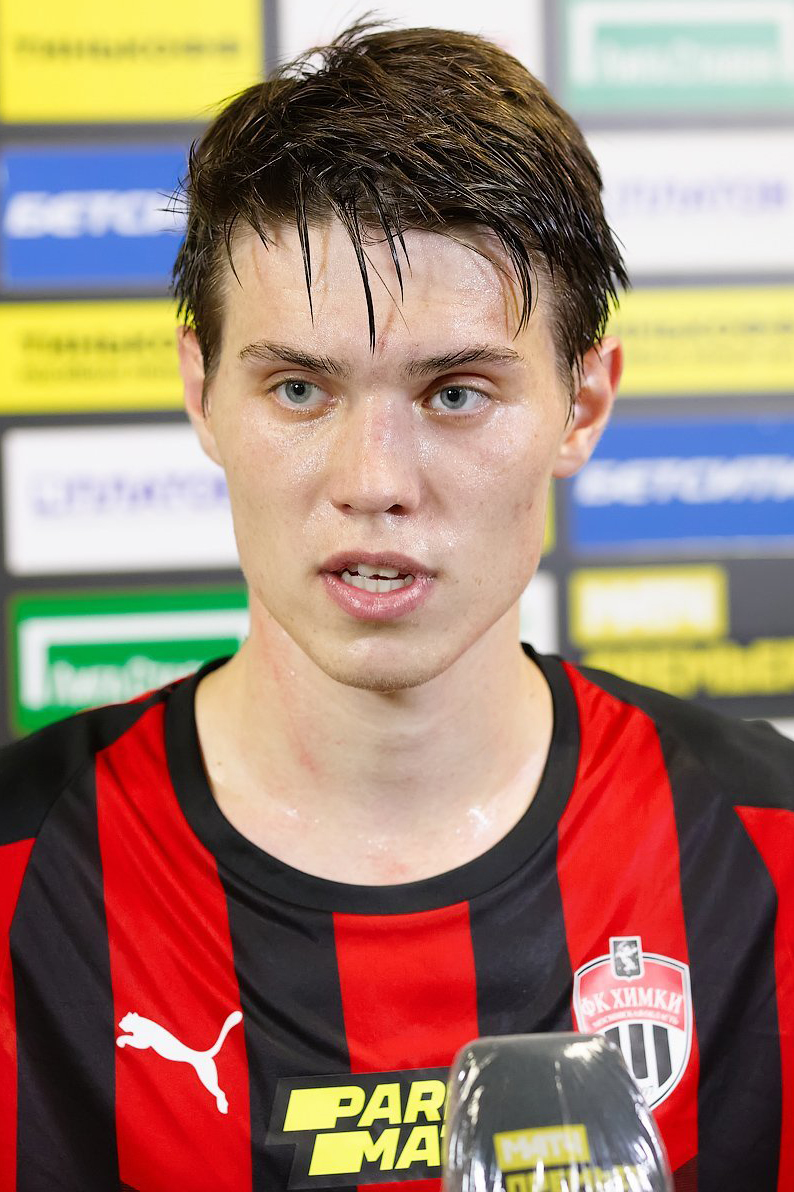
- Dolgov with FC Khimki in 2020

Personal information
- Full name: Aleksandr Vladimirovich Dolgov
- Date of birth: 24 September 1998 (age 28)
- Place of birth: Voronezh, Russia
- Height: 1.84 m (6 ft 0 in)
- Position: Forward

Youth career
- –2018: Lokomotiv Moscow

Senior career*
Years	Team	Apps	(Gls)
2017–2019	Kazanka Moscow	42	(17)
2019–2021	Rostov	20	(0)
2020–2021	→ Khimki (loan)	6	(1)
2021–2023	Khimki	38	(6)
2023–2024	Fakel Voronezh	9	(1)
2024	Urartu	6	(0)
2025	Yenisey Krasnoyarsk	8	(1)
2025	2DROTS Moscow (amateur)		
2026	Amkar Perm	16	(2)

International career^{‡}
2019	Russia U-20	3	(2)
- * Club domestic league appearances and goals as of 14 June 2026 ‡ National team caps and goals as of 15 June 2019

Aleksandr Vladimirovich Dolgov (Russian: Александр Владимирович Долгов; born 24 September 1998) is a Russian football player who plays as a centre-forward.

== Club career ==
He made his debut in the Russian Professional Football League for Kazanka Moscow on 11 August 2017 in a game against Kolomna.

He made his Russian Premier League debut for Rostov on 25 August 2019 in a game against FC Rubin Kazan, as a 90th-minute substitute for Aleksandr Saplinov.

On 16 October 2020 he was loaned to Khimki.

On 3 September 2021, he returned to Khimki on a permanent basis and signed a three-year contract with the club.

On 26 June 2023, Dolgov signed a two-year contract with his hometown club Fakel Voronezh. Dolgov left Fakel by mutual consent on 1 February 2024.

On 25 February 2024, Dolgov signed for Armenian Premier League club Urartu. On 3 June 2024, Urartu announced the departure of Dolgov.

On 23 February 2025, Yenisey Krasnoyarsk announced the signing of Dolgov on a contract until the end of the season.

== Honours ==
=== Individual ===
- Russian Professional Football League Zone West best player, best scorer (15 goals), best young player (2018–19).

== Career statistics ==
As of 27 November 2022

Club	Season	League			Cup		Continental		Other		Total	
Club	Season	Division	Apps	Goals	Apps	Goals	Apps	Goals	Apps	Goals	Apps	Goals
Kazanka Moscow	2017–18	PFL	21	2	–		–		5 (Note: Appearances in the FNL Cup)	0	26	2
Kazanka Moscow	2018–19	PFL	21	15	–		–		–		21	15
Kazanka Moscow	Total		42	17	0	0	0	0	5	0	47	17
Rostov	2019–20	RPL	15	0	2	1	–		–		17	1
Rostov	2020–21	RPL	5	0	–		0	0	–		5	0
Rostov	Total		20	0	2	1	0	0	0	0	22	1
Khimki	2020–21	RPL	6	1	1	0	–		–		7	1
Khimki	2021–22	RPL	13	2	2	1	–		2 (Note: Appearances in the relegation play-offs)	1	17	4
Khimki	2022–23	RPL	17	4	4	0	–		–		21	4
Khimki	Total		36	7	7	1	0	0	2	1	45	9
Career total			98	24	9	2	0	0	7	1	114	27
