= Timofey Kalistratov =

Russian footballer

Personal information
- Full name: Timofey Vladimirovich Kalistratov
- Date of birth: 18 February 2003 (age 23)
- Height: 1.98 m (6 ft 6 in)
- Positions: Defender; midfielder

Team information
- Current team: KAMAZ Naberezhnye Chelny
- Number: 6

Youth career
- –2016: Zenit St. Petersburg
- 2017–2019: Almaz-Antey St. Petersburg
- 2019–2022: Rostov

Senior career*
Years	Team	Apps	(Gls)
2020–2022	Rostov	1	(0)
2022	→ Dynamo St. Petersburg (loan)	11	(1)
2022–2024	Dynamo St. Petersburg	33	(3)
2024–2025	Kaluga	29	(0)
2025–	KAMAZ Naberezhnye Chelny	21	(2)
- * Club domestic league appearances and goals as of 16 May 2026

Timofey Vladimirovich Kalistratov (Russian: Тимофей Владимирович Калистратов; born 18 February 2003) is a Russian football player who plays for KAMAZ Naberezhnye Chelny.

== Club career ==
He made his debut in the Russian Premier League for Rostov on 19 June 2020 in a game against Sochi, as a starter. Rostov was forced to field their Under-18 squad in that game as their main squad was quarantined after 6 players tested positive for COVID-19.

On 22 February 2022, Kalistratov was loaned to Dynamo St. Petersburg.

== Career statistics ==
As of 16 May 2026

Club	Season	League			Cup		Total	
Club	Season	Division	Apps	Goals	Apps	Goals	Apps	Goals
Rostov	2019–20	Russian Premier League	1	0	—		1	0
Dynamo St. Petersburg (loan)	2021–22	Russian Second League	11	1	—		11	1
Dynamo St. Petersburg	2022–23	Russian Second League	19	3	0	0	19	3
Dynamo St. Petersburg	2023	Russian Second League B	14	0	2	0	16	0
Dynamo St. Petersburg	2024	Russian Second League B	0	0	0	0	0	0
Dynamo St. Petersburg	Total		33	3	2	0	35	3
Kaluga	2024–25	Russian Second League A	29	0	1	0	30	0
KAMAZ	2025–26	Russian First League	21	2	3	0	24	2
Career total			95	6	6	0	101	6
