= Pöllau =

- Municipality
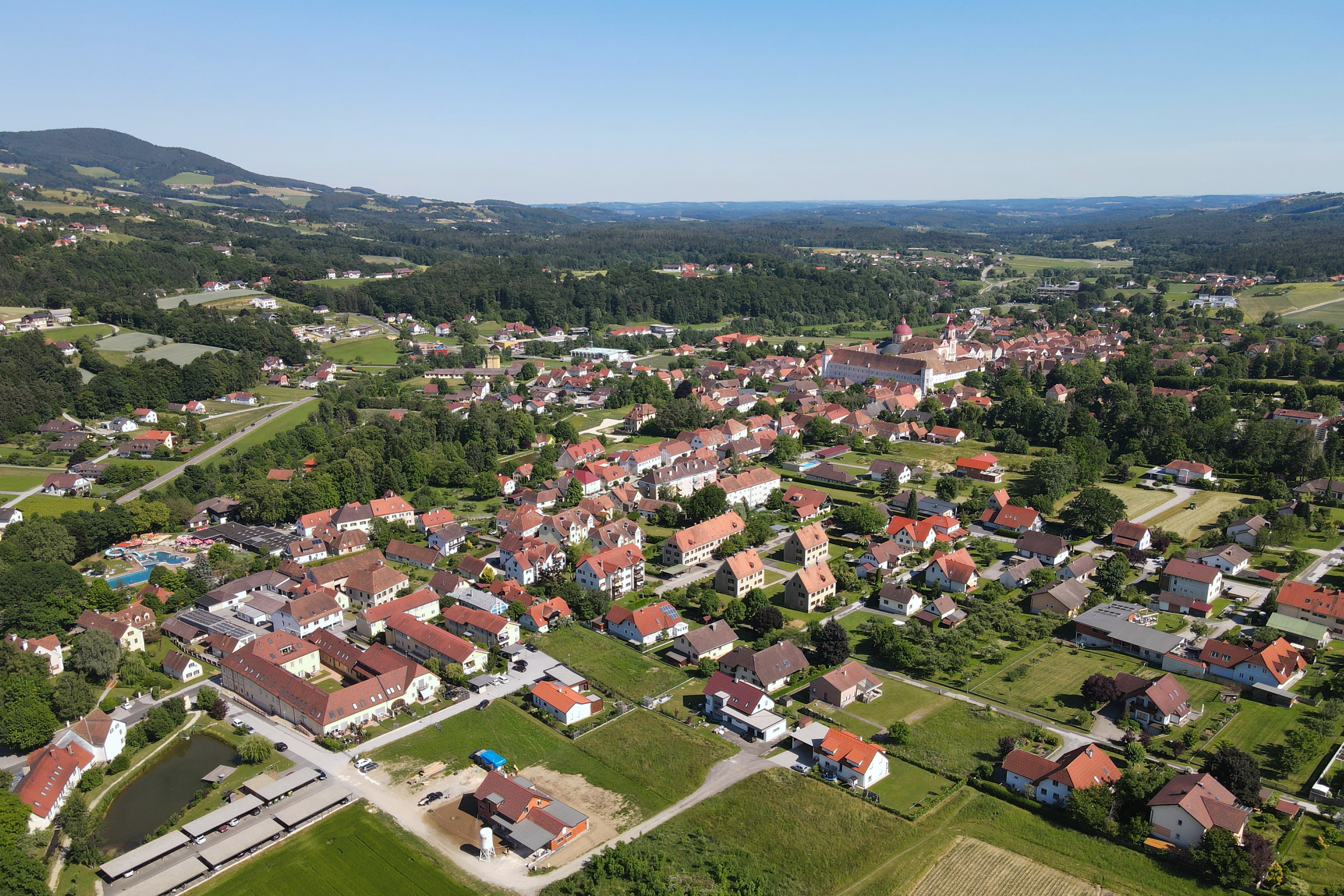
- Northwest view of Pöllau

- Coat of arms

- Location within Austria
- Coordinates: 47°18′07″N 15°50′02″E
- Country: Austria
- State: Styria
- District: Hartberg-Fürstenfeld

Government
  - Mayor: Josef Pfeifer (ÖVP)

Area
  - Total: 88.17 km^{2} (34.04 sq mi)
- Elevation: 425 m (1,394 ft)

Population (2018-01-01)
  - Total: 6,054
  - Density: 68.66/km^{2} (177.8/sq mi)
- Time zone: UTC+1 (CET)
  - Summer (DST): UTC+2 (CEST)
- Postal code: 8225
- Area code: 03335
- Vehicle registration: HF
- Website: www.poellau. steiermark.at

Pöllau is a municipality in the district of Hartberg-Fürstenfeld in Styria, Austria.
