= Kirill Malyarov =

Russian footballer

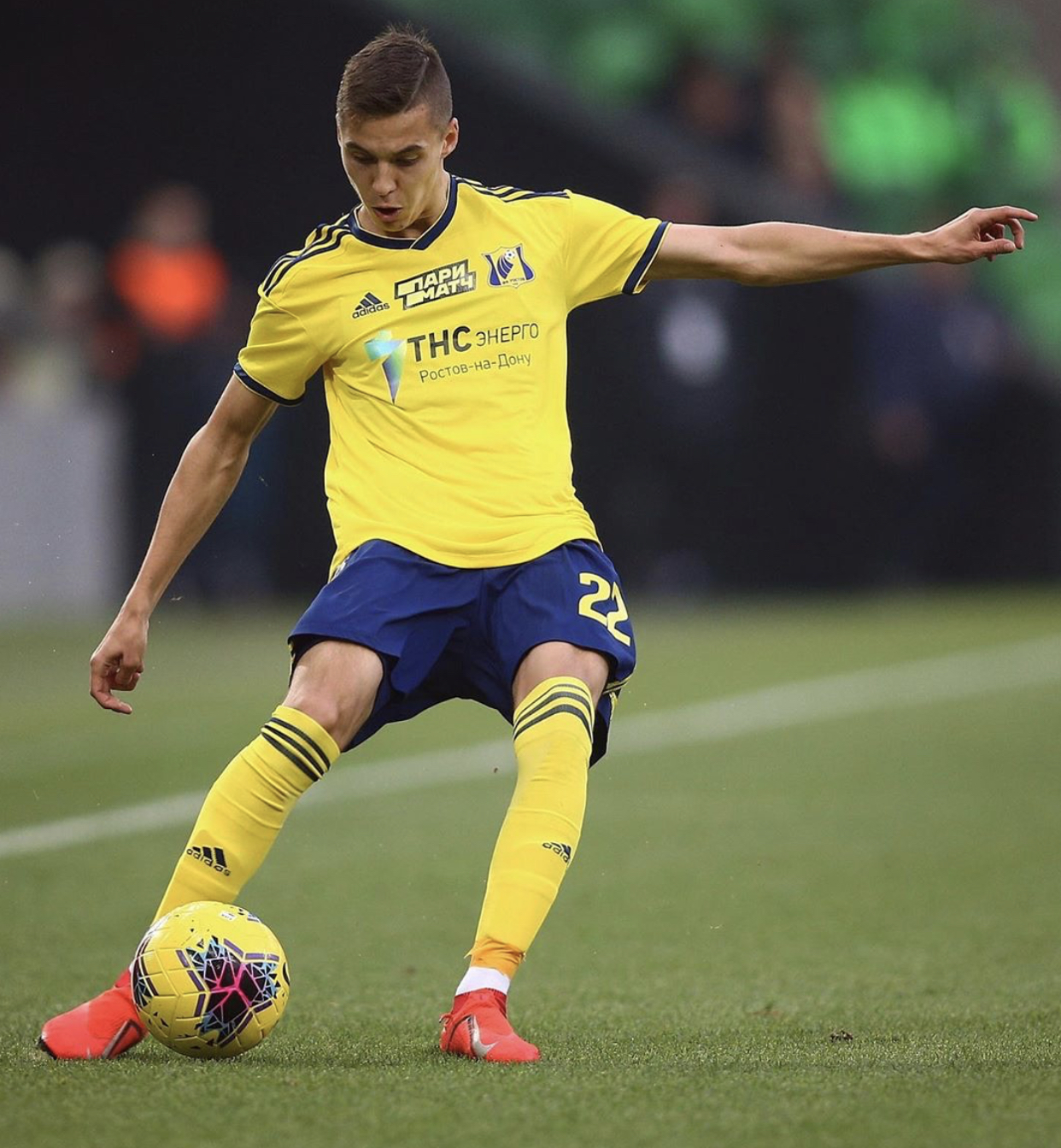

Personal information
- Full name: Kirill Anatolyevich Malyarov
- Date of birth: 7 March 1997 (age 29)
- Place of birth: Moscow, Russia
- Height: 1.79 m (5 ft 10 in)
- Positions: Right midfielder; left midfielder

Team information
- Current team: Spartak Kostroma
- Number: 7

Youth career
- 2013–2014: Volga Nizhny Novgorod

Senior career*
Years	Team	Apps	(Gls)
2014–2016	Volga Nizhny Novgorod	24	(1)
2016–2017	Dynamo-2 Moscow	23	(1)
2017–2018	Olimpiyets Nizhny Novgorod	24	(0)
2018–2019	Rotor Volgograd	21	(0)
2019	Rostov	0	(0)
2020	Belshina Bobruisk	10	(0)
2020–2021	Nizhny Novgorod	34	(0)
2022	Shakhter Karagandy	11	(0)
2022–2024	Baltika Kaliningrad	62	(4)
2024	→ Baltika-BFU Kaliningrad	3	(0)
2025	Neftekhimik Nizhnekamsk	6	(0)
2025–2026	Shinnik Yaroslavl	33	(1)
2026–	Spartak Kostroma	0	(0)

International career
2016	Russia U19	3	(0)
- * Club domestic league appearances and goals as of 16 May 2026

Kirill Anatolyevich Malyarov (Russian: Кирилл Анатольевич Маляров; born 7 March 1997) is a Russian football player who plays as a right midfielder or left midfielder for Spartak Kostroma. Earlier in his career, he mostly played as a right-back or left-back.

== Club career ==
He made his professional debut in the Russian Football National League for FC Volga Nizhny Novgorod on 11 July 2015 in a game against FK Yenisey Krasnoyarsk.

On 27 January 2020, his contract with FC Rostov was terminated by mutual consent. He then spent the first half of 2020 in Belshina Bobruisk, before returning to Nizhny Novgorod in the summer.

Malyarov made his Russian Premier League debut for FC Baltika Kaliningrad on 23 July 2023 in a game against PFC Sochi.

== Personal life ==
His older brother Nikita Malyarov is also a professional footballer.

== Career statistics ==
As of match played 6 May 2024.

Appearances and goals by club, season and competition
Club	Season	League			Cup		Europe		Other		Total	
Club	Season	Division	Apps	Goals	Apps	Goals	Apps	Goals	Apps	Goals	Apps	Goals
Volga Nizhny Novgorod	2015–16	Russian Football National League	24	1	2	0	—		—		26	1
Dynamo-2 Moscow	2016–17	Russian Second League	23	0	—		—		—		23	0
Nizhny Novgorod	2017–18	Russian Football National League	24	0	3	1	—		—		27	1
Rotor Volgograd	2018–19	Russian Football National League	21	0	1	0	—		—		22	0
Rostov	2019–20	Russian Premier League	0	0	1	0	0	0	—		1	0
Belshina Bobruisk	2020	Belarusian Premier League	10	0	0	0	—		—		10	0
Nizhny Novgorod	2020–21	Russian Football National League	34	0	2	0	—		—		36	0
Shakhter Karagandy	2022	Kazakhstan Premier League	11	0	0	0	—		—		11	0
Baltika Kaliningrad	2022–23	Russian First League	33	2	—		—		—		33	2
Baltika Kaliningrad	2023–24	Russian Premier League	20	0	8	0	—		—		28	0
Baltika Kaliningrad	Total		53	2	8	0	—		—		61	2
Career total			200	3	17	1	0	0	0	0	217	4
