= Vilyam Rogava =

Russian footballer

Personal information
- Full name: Vilyam Kakhaberovich Rogava
- Date of birth: 25 January 2003 (age 23)
- Height: 1.85 m (6 ft 1 in)
- Position: Midfielder

Senior career*
Years	Team	Apps	(Gls)
2020–2021	FC Rostov	1	(0)
- * Club domestic league appearances and goals

Vilyam Kakhaberovich Rogava (Russian: Вильям Кахаберович Рогава; born 25 January 2003) is a Russian former football player of Georgian descent.

== Club career ==
He made his debut in the Russian Premier League for FC Rostov on 19 June 2020 in a game against PFC Sochi. FC Rostov was forced to field their Under-18 squad in that game as their main squad was quarantined after 6 players tested positive for COVID-19.
