= Nikita Kashtan =

Russian footballer

Personal information
- Full name: Nikita Sergeyevich Kashtan
- Date of birth: 1 September 2003 (age 23)
- Height: 1.73 m (5 ft 8 in)
- Position: Midfielder

Team information
- Current team: Dynamo Stavropol
- Number: 86

Senior career*
Years	Team	Apps	(Gls)
2020–2024	Rostov	1	(0)
2023	→ SKA Rostov-on-Don (loan)	17	(2)
2024–2025	Rostov-2	35	(4)
2025–	Dynamo Stavropol	41	(2)
- * Club domestic league appearances and goals as of 17 October 2026

Nikita Sergeyevich Kashtan (Russian: Никита Сергеевич Каштан; born 1 September 2003) is a Russian football player who plays for Dynamo Stavropol.

== Club career ==
He made his debut in the Russian Premier League for Rostov on 19 June 2020 in a game against Sochi. FC Rostov was forced to field their Under-18 squad in that game as their main squad was quarantined after 6 players tested positive for COVID-19.

== Career statistics ==
As of 31 May 2024

Club	Season	League			Cup		Continental		Other		Total	
Club	Season	Division	Apps	Goals	Apps	Goals	Apps	Goals	Apps	Goals	Apps	Goals
Rostov	2019–20	Russian Premier League	1	0	0	0	–		–		1	0
Rostov	2023–24	Russian Premier League	0	0	0	0	–		–		0	0
Rostov	Total		1	0	0	0	0	0	0	0	1	0
SKA Rostov-on-Don (loan)	2023	Russian Second League B	17	2	3	2	–		–		20	4
Rostov-2	2024	Russian Second League B	8	2	–		–		–		8	2
Career total			26	4	3	2	0	0	0	0	29	6
