= Ilya Bykovsky =

Russian footballer (born 2001)

Personal information
- Full name: Ilya Valeryevich Bykovsky
- Date of birth: 16 February 2001 (age 25)
- Place of birth: Lyubertsy, Russia
- Height: 1.75 m (5 ft 9 in)
- Position: Left-back

Youth career
- –2012: DYuSSh Sokol-Khimik Stupinsky District
- 2012–2019: Spartak Moscow
- 2019–2020: Arsenal Tula
- 2020: Ural Yekaterinburg

Senior career*
Years	Team	Apps	(Gls)
2020–2023	Ural Yekaterinburg	7	(1)
2020–2023	Ural-2 Yekaterinburg	55	(1)
2023–2024	Arsenal Tula	12	(0)
2023–2024	Arsenal-2 Tula	3	(0)
2024–2026	Leningradets Leningrad Oblast	36	(0)
2026	Kuban Krasnodar	9	(0)

International career^{‡}
2018	Russia U18	7	(0)
2019–2020	Russia U19	7	(2)
- * Club domestic league appearances and goals as of 14 June 2026 ‡ National team caps and goals as of 11 February 2020

Ilya Valeryevich Bykovsky (Russian: Илья Валерьевич Быковский; born 16 February 2001) is a Russian footballer who plays as a left-back.

== Club career ==
Bykovsky made his debut in the Russian Premier League for Ural Yekaterinburg on 29 July 2022 in a game against FC Krasnodar.

== Career statistics ==
As of 27 November 2022

Club	Season	League			Cup		Continental		Other		Total	
Club	Season	Division	Apps	Goals	Apps	Goals	Apps	Goals	Apps	Goals	Apps	Goals
Ural Yekaterinburg	2019–20	Premier League	0	0	0	0	–		2 (Note: Appearances in the FNL Cup)	0	2	0
Ural Yekaterinburg	2021–22	Premier League	0	0	0	0	–		–		0	0
Ural Yekaterinburg	2022–23	Premier League	7	1	3	0	–		–		10	1
Ural Yekaterinburg	Total		7	1	3	0	0	0	2	0	12	1
Ural-2 Yekaterinburg	2020–21	Second League	22	0	–		–		–		22	0
Ural-2 Yekaterinburg	2021–22	Second League	24	1	–		–		–		24	1
Ural-2 Yekaterinburg	2022–23	Second League	1	0	–		–		–		1	0
Ural-2 Yekaterinburg	Total		47	1	0	0	0	0	0	0	47	1
Career total			54	2	3	0	0	0	2	0	59	2
