= Tamaz Topuria =

Russian footballer

Tamaz Topuriya
Personal information
- Full name: Tamaz Arkadyevich Topuriya
- Date of birth: 29 January 2002 (age 24)
- Height: 1.70 m (5 ft 7 in)
- Position: Forward

Youth career
- Rostov

Senior career*
| Years | Team | Apps | (Gls) |
| 2019–2022 | Rostov | 1 | (0) |
| 2021–2022 | → SKA Rostov-on-Don (loan) | 5 | (0) |
| 2022–2024 | Spartak Nalchik | 60 | (14) |
| 2024–2026 | Mashuk-KMV Pyatigorsk | 51 | (6) |
- * Club domestic league appearances and goals as of 13 June 2026

Tamaz Arkadyevich Topuriya (Russian: Тамаз Аркадьевич Топурия; born 29 January 2002) is a Russian football player of Georgian descent.

== Club career ==
He made his debut in the Russian Premier League for Rostov on 19 June 2020 in a game against Sochi. FC Rostov was forced to field their Under-18 squad in that game as their main squad was quarantined after 6 players tested positive for COVID-19.

On 27 August 2021, he joined SKA Rostov-on-Don on loan.
