= Maksim Aktisov =

Russian football player

Personal information
- Full name: Maksim Konstantinovich Aktisov
- Date of birth: 28 January 2000 (age 26)
- Place of birth: Cheboksary, Russia
- Height: 1.88 m (6 ft 2 in)
- Positions: Midfielder; defender

Team information
- Current team: FC 2DROTS Moscow

Youth career
- –2019: FC Spartak Moscow

Senior career*
Years	Team	Apps	(Gls)
2018–2019	FC Spartak-2 Moscow	11	(0)
2020–2022	FC Kazanka Moscow	18	(0)
2022–2023	FC Tver	18	(0)
2023–	FC 2DROTS Moscow (amateur)		

International career^{‡}
2018	Russia U18	3	(0)
- * Club domestic league appearances and goals as of 3 June 2023 ‡ National team caps and goals as of 8 May 2018

Maksim Konstantinovich Aktisov (Russian: Максим Константинович Актисов; born 28 January 2000) is a Russian football player. He plays for FC 2DROTS Moscow.

== Club career ==
He made his debut in the Russian Football National League for FC Spartak-2 Moscow on 20 April 2019 in a game against FC Mordovia Saransk.
