= Yevgeni Cherkes =

Russian footballer

Personal information
- Full name: Yevgeni Aleksandrovich Cherkes
- Date of birth: 23 June 2001 (age 25)
- Place of birth: Voronezh, Russia
- Height: 1.81 m (5 ft 11 in)
- Position: Midfielder

Youth career
- –2012: DFK Strela Voronezh
- 2012–2017: SDYuSShOR-15 Voronezh
- 2017: DFK Strela Voronezh
- 2017–2018: Energomash Shebekino

Senior career*
Years	Team	Apps	(Gls)
2017	Strela Voronezh		
2018	Energomash Belgorod	0	(0)
2018	Salyut Belgorod	11	(0)
2019–2021	Rostov	1	(0)
2020–2021	→ Forte Taganrog (loan)	17	(2)
2021–2022	Khimki-M	21	(0)
2022–2023	Neftekhimik Nizhnekamsk	9	(0)
2023–2024	Chelyabinsk	4	(0)
2024	→ Torpedo Miass (loan)	10	(0)
2024–2025	Dynamo Kirov	44	(2)
- * Club domestic league appearances and goals as of 16 November 2025

Yevgeni Aleksandrovich Cherkes (Russian: Евгений Александрович Черкес; born 23 June 2001) is a Russian football player who plays as a central midfielder.муж Динары

== Club career ==
He made his debut in the Russian Premier League for Rostov on 27 June 2020 in a game against Arsenal Tula, replacing Baktiyar Zaynutdinov in the 88th minute.

== Personal life ==
His father Aleksandr Cherkes is a football coach and former player.
