= Nikita Malyarov =

Russian footballer (born 1989)

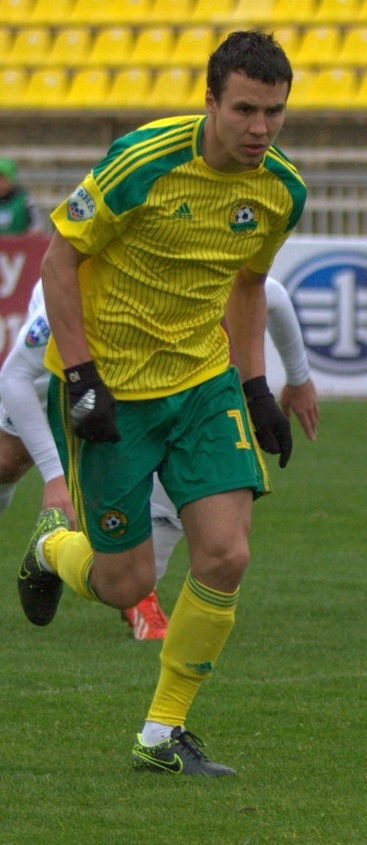
- Malyarov with Kuban in 2017

Personal information
- Full name: Nikita Anatolyevich Malyarov
- Date of birth: 23 October 1989 (age 37)
- Place of birth: Moscow, Russian SFSR
- Height: 1.79 m (5 ft 10 in)
- Position: Midfielder

Senior career*
Years	Team	Apps	(Gls)
2007	FC Znamya Truda Orekhovo-Zuyevo	4	(0)
2008	FC Torpedo (Youth) Moscow		
2008	FC Energetik Uren	16	(3)
2009	FC Nara-ShBFR Naro-Fominsk	15	(1)
2009	→ FC Khimik Dzerzhinsk (loan)	9	(1)
2010–2011	PFC Spartak Nalchik	17	(2)
2011–2014	FC Volga Nizhny Novgorod	20	(1)
2012–2013	→ FC Ufa (loan)	7	(1)
2014–2016	FC Shinnik Yaroslavl	62	(14)
2016–2018	FC Kuban Krasnodar	66	(11)
2018–2019	FC Orenburg	13	(1)
2020	FC Khimki	0	(0)
2020–2021	FC Shinnik Yaroslavl	21	(4)
2021–2022	FC Rotor Volgograd	16	(0)
2022	FC Aktobe	9	(1)
2022	FC KAMAZ Naberezhnye Chelny	5	(0)
2023–2024	FC Volgar Astrakhan	6	(1)
2024–2025	FC Chayka Peschanokopskoye	29	(2)
2025–2026	FC Chelyabinsk	0	(0)

International career^{‡}
2010	Russia U-21	1	(0)
2011	Russia-2	1	(0)
- * Club domestic league appearances and goals as of 16 May 2026 ‡ National team caps and goals as of 10 October 2011

Nikita Anatolyevich Malyarov (Russian: Никита Анатольевич Маляров; born 23 October 1989) is a Russian former professional football player.

== Personal life ==
His younger brother Kirill Malyarov is also a professional footballer.
