= Maksim Stavtsev =

Russian footballer

Personal information
- Full name: Maksim Pavlovich Stavtsev
- Date of birth: 29 January 2004 (age 22)
- Height: 1.80 m (5 ft 11 in)
- Positions: Forward; midfielder

Youth career
- Rostov

Senior career*
Years	Team	Apps	(Gls)
2020–2021	Rostov	1	(0)
2022	Rostov	0	(0)
2023	Zorkiy Krasnogorsk	12	(3)
2023–2024	Kaluga	32	(10)
2024	→ Oryol (loan)	11	(1)
2025	Arsenal-2 Tula	14	(3)
- * Club domestic league appearances and goals as of 3 August 2025

Maksim Pavlovich Stavtsev (Russian: Максим Павлович Ставцев; born 29 January 2004) is a Russian football player.

== Club career ==
He made his debut in the Russian Premier League for Rostov on 19 June 2020 in a game against Sochi. FC Rostov was forced to field their Under-18 squad in that game as their main squad was quarantined after six players tested positive for COVID-19.
