= Dmitri Veber =

Russian footballer

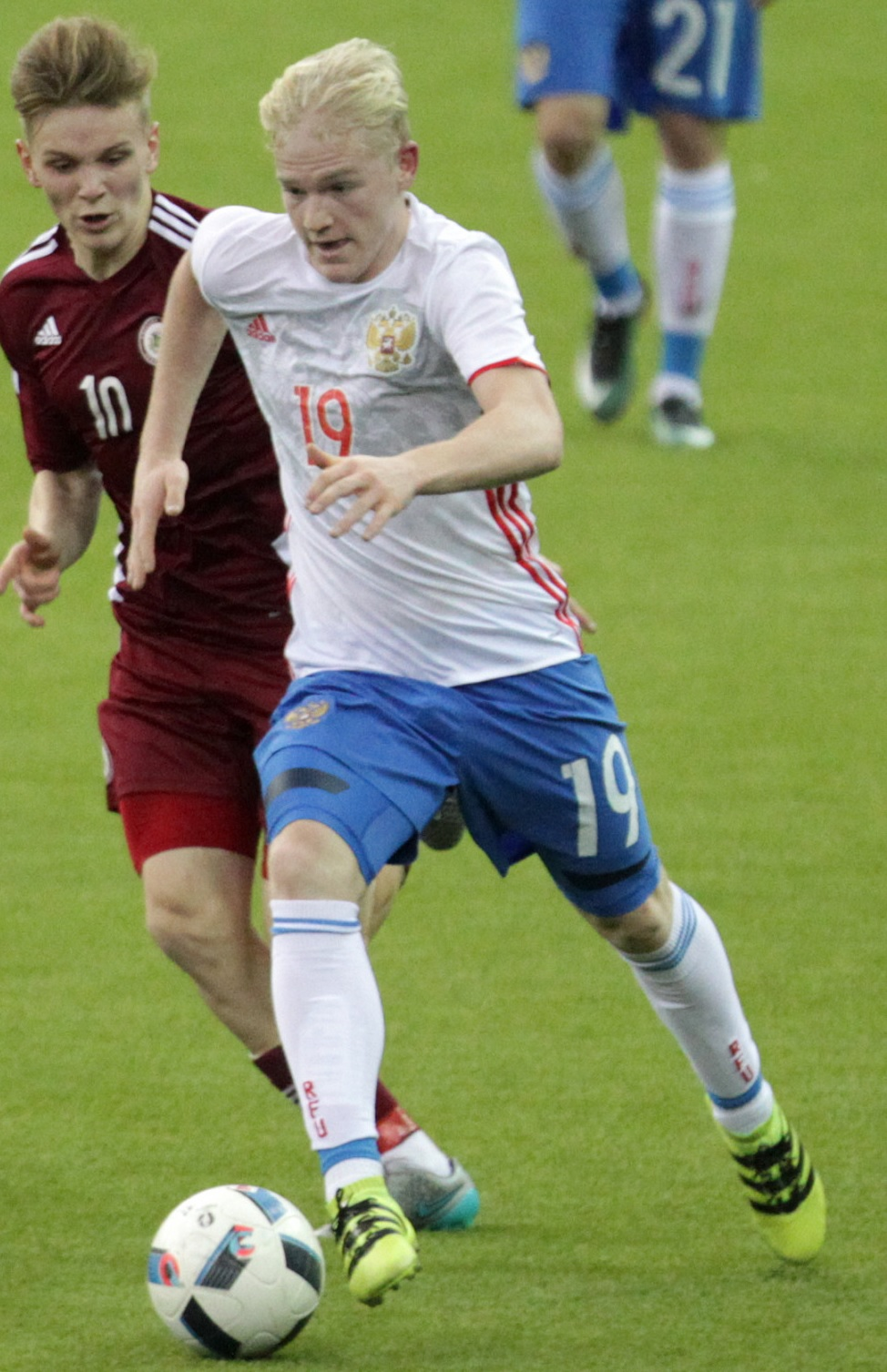
- Veber with Russia U-18 in 2017

Personal information
- Full name: Dmitri Vitalyevich Veber
- Date of birth: 10 February 1999 (age 27)
- Place of birth: Rostov-on-Don, Russia
- Height: 1.74 m (5 ft 9 in)
- Position: Midfielder

Senior career*
| Years | Team | Apps | (Gls) |
| 2015 | FC SKA Rostov-on-Don | 2 | (0) |
| 2016–2019 | FC Rostov | 1 | (0) |
| 2020–2021 | FC Veles Moscow | 0 | (0) |
| 2020 | → FC Kolomna (loan) | 4 | (0) |
| 2021 | FC TSK Simferopol | | |
| 2021 | FC Biolog-Novokubansk | 9 | (1) |

International career
| 2016–2017 | Russia U-18 | 14 | (3) |
- * Club domestic league appearances and goals

Dmitri Vitalyevich Veber (Russian: Дмитрий Витальевич Вебер; born 10 February 1999) is a Russian former football player.

== Club career ==
He made his debut in the Russian Professional Football League for FC SKA Rostov-on-Don on 22 August 2015 in a game against FC Druzhba Maykop.

Veber played his first match in the Russian Premier League for FC Rostov on 9 September 2016 in a game against FC Krylia Sovetov Samara.
