= Denis Popov (footballer, born 2002) =

Russian footballer

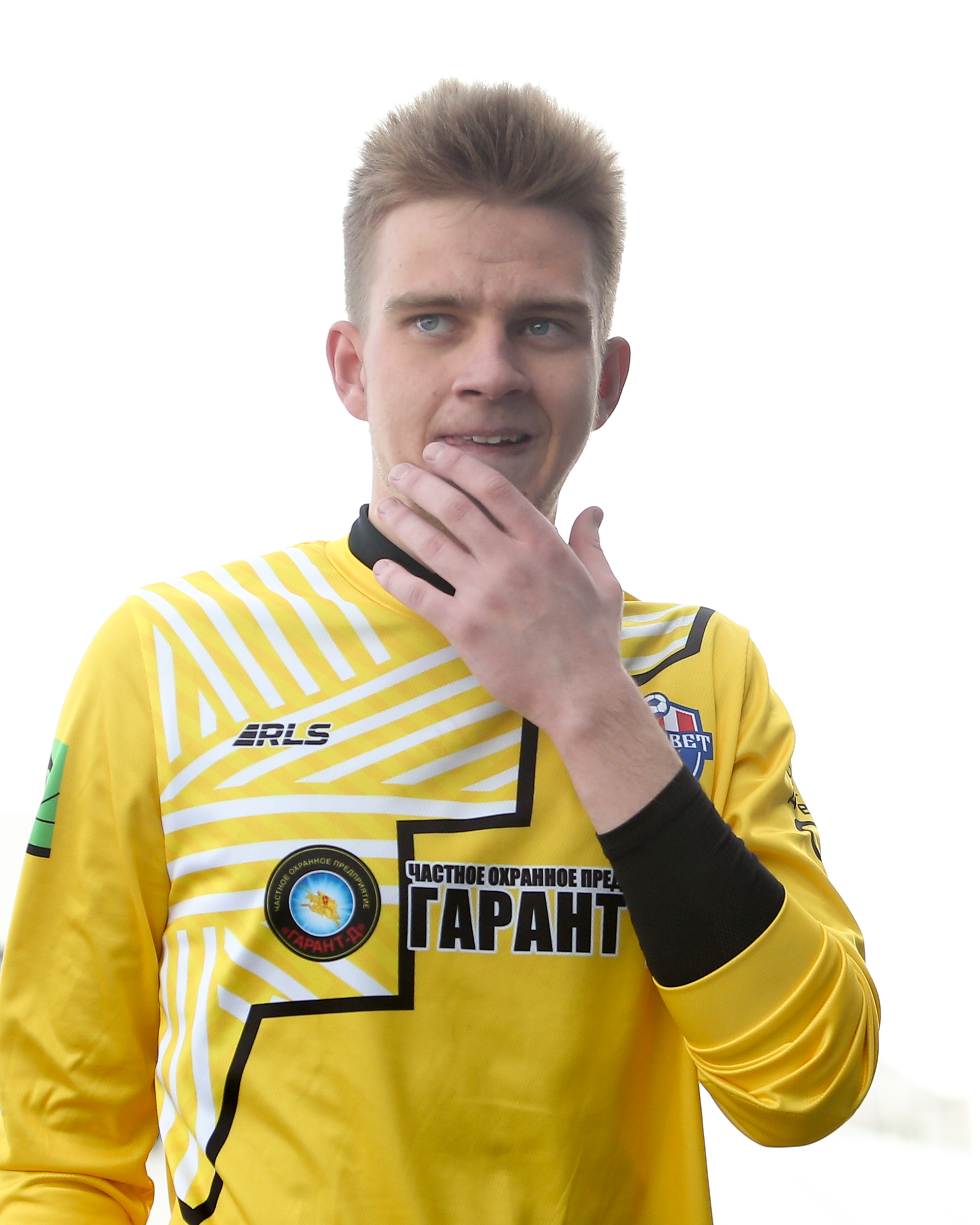

Personal information
- Full name: Denis Vladimirovich Popov
- Date of birth: 29 August 2002 (age 24)
- Height: 1.87 m (6 ft 2 in)
- Position: Goalkeeper

Youth career
- Rostov

Senior career*
Years	Team	Apps	(Gls)
2019–2020	Rostov	1	(0)
2021–2022	Valmiera	0	(0)
2022–2023	Valmiera II	1	(0)
2023	Peresvet Domodedovo	10	(0)
- * Club domestic league appearances and goals as of 10 June 2023

Denis Vladimirovich Popov (Russian: Денис Владимирович Попов; born 29 August 2002) is a Russian footballer who plays as a goalkeeper.

== Club career ==
He made his debut in the Russian Premier League for Rostov on 19 June 2020 in a game against Sochi. Rostov were forced to field their Under-18 squad in that game as their main squad was quarantined after 6 players tested positive for COVID-19. Despite allowing ten goals in a 10–1 away defeat, he was selected Player of the Match, as he made 15 saves (setting the Russian Premier League record) including a saved penalty kick.

On 15 December 2020, Popov announced that he left Rostov.
