= Pavel Mamayev =

Russian footballer

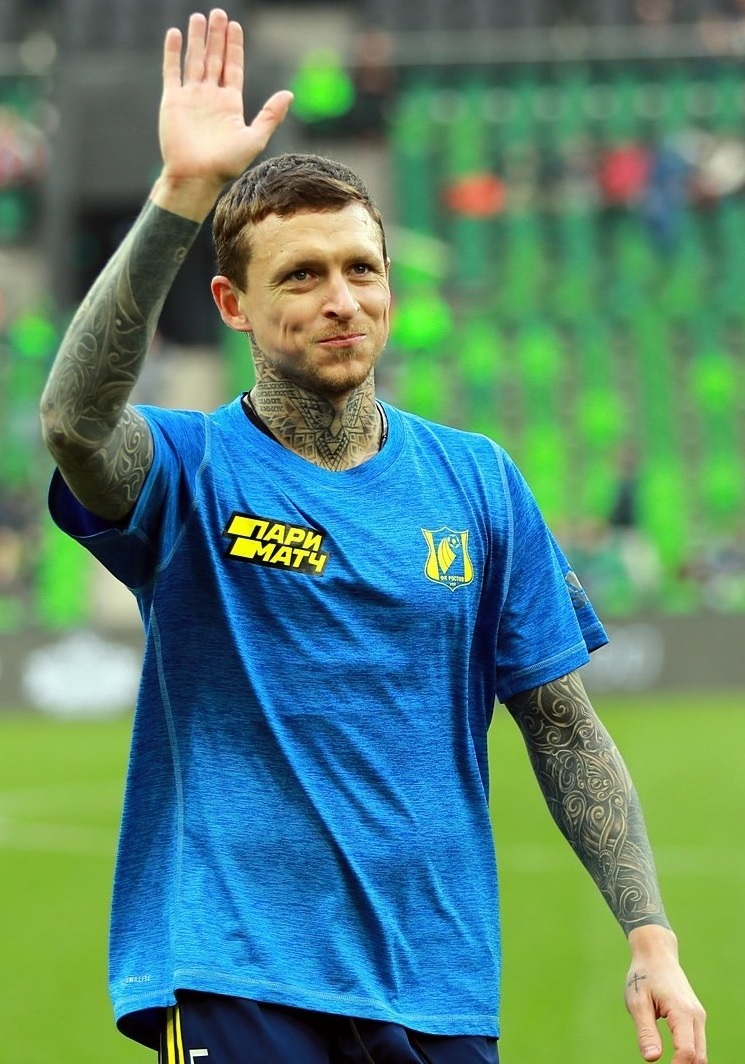
- Mamaev with FC Rostov in 2019

Personal information
- Full name: Pavel Konstantinovich Mamayev
- Date of birth: 17 September 1988 (age 38)
- Place of birth: Shishkin Les, Russian SFSR, Soviet Union
- Height: 1.78 m (5 ft 10 in)
- Position: Midfielder

Youth career
- Youth Section Shishkin Les
- 2000–: SDYuShOR Podolye Podolsky
- –2006: Torpedo Moscow
- 2007–2008: CSKA Moscow

Senior career*
Years	Team	Apps	(Gls)
2005–2007	Torpedo Moscow	44	(3)
2007–2013	CSKA Moscow	128	(6)
2013	→ Krasnodar (loan)	21	(4)
2013–2019	Krasnodar	91	(21)
2020–2021	Rostov	26	(4)
2022	Khimki	1	(0)

International career
2007	Russia U-19	10	(2)
2007–2010	Russia U-21	14	(4)
2010–2016	Russia	15	(0)
- * Club domestic league appearances and goals

Pavel Konstantinovich Mamayev (Russian: Павел Константинович Мамаев; born 17 September 1988) is a Russian former footballer who played as midfielder. He primarily played as a right midfielder or central midfielder. At CSKA Moscow he played as a defensive midfielder or deep-lying playmaker. On 8 May 2019, he was convicted in court of "intended infliction of minor harm to a health official" and sentenced to imprisonment until late 2019. He was released on 17 September 2019.

== Club career ==
Mamayev began his career at the FC Torpedo Moscow academy. He moved to CSKA Moscow in summer 2007, and made his debut on 29 July 2007 against FC Khimki.

In July 2013 Mamayev joined FC Krasnodar on a season long loan from CSKA Moscow. On 6 December 2013, FC Krasnodar bought out his contract from CSKA and he signed a 3-year contract.

Mamayev had his contract with Krasnodar terminated on 20 September 2019.

On 28 September 2019, FC Rostov announced the signing of Mamayev, signing him to a two-year contract with the option of another.

On 20 December 2021, Pavel signed a contract with FC Khimki. Mamayev left Khimki on 3 June 2022.

On 11 February 2023, Mamayev announced his retirement as a player.

== International career ==
Mamaev was a part of the Russia U-21 side that was competing in the 2011 European Under-21 Championship qualification.

In 2009, he was called up for the Russia senior national team for the first time. He made his debut for the national team on 17 November 2010 in a game against Belgium.

== Personal life ==
On 7 October 2018, after Krasnodar's Russian Premier League game away to Zenit St.Petersburg, in which Mamayev scored Krasnodar's goal in a 2–1 defeat, Mamayev and Aleksandr Kokorin traveled to Moscow for a night out. The following morning both Mamayev and Kokorin are said to have been involved in a drunken attack on Russian Trade Ministry official Denis Pak, resulting in Pak requiring medical attention. As a result, Krasnodar announced that they had imposed the maximum fine they could on Mamayev, removed him from first team training and were investigating how to terminate his contract. Hours before that incident, Mamayev, Kokorin and other young people were involved in an altercation with the driver of a Channel One show presenter; he received brain damage, nose fracture and face contusions after numerous punches. Mamayev was apprehended for two months. Mamayev remained in prison until his trial, which began on 9 April 2019. On 8 May 2019, he was sentenced to 17 months in penal colony. Considering the time he spent in pre-trial detention, the latest possible date for his release from custody was 13 November 2019. He was released on 17 September 2019.

== Career statistics ==
=== Club ===
As of match played 28 May 2022

Appearances and goals by club, season and competition
Club	Season	League			Cup		Continental		Other		Total	
Club	Season	Division	Apps	Goals	Apps	Goals	Apps	Goals	Apps	Goals	Apps	Goals
Torpedo Moscow	2004	Russian Premier League	0	0	0	0	–		–		0	0
Torpedo Moscow	2005	Russian Premier League	13	0	2	0	–		–		15	0
Torpedo Moscow	2006	Russian Premier League	27	3	4	1	–		–		31	4
Torpedo Moscow	2007	FNL	4	0	2	0	–		–		6	0
Torpedo Moscow	Total		44	3	8	1	0	0	0	0	52	4
CSKA Moscow	2007	Russian Premier League	4	0	0	0	1	0	–		5	0
CSKA Moscow	2008	Russian Premier League	17	2	2	0	5	0	–		24	2
CSKA Moscow	2009	Russian Premier League	28	2	3	0	9	0	–		40	2
CSKA Moscow	2010	Russian Premier League	27	0	1	0	10	0	1 (Note: One appearance in the Russian Super Cup)	0	39	0
CSKA Moscow	2011–12	Russian Premier League	33	1	5	0	10	0	1 (Note: One appearance in the Russian Super Cup)	0	49	1
CSKA Moscow	2012–13	Russian Premier League	19	1	4	2	0	0	–		23	3
CSKA Moscow	2013–14	Russian Premier League	0	0	0	0	0	0	1 (Note: One appearance in the Russian Super Cup)	0	1	0
CSKA Moscow	Total		128	6	15	2	35	0	3	0	181	8
Krasnodar (loan)	2013–14	Russian Premier League	21	4	3	1	–		–		24	5
Krasnodar	2014–15	Russian Premier League	21	4	1	0	4	0	–		26	4
Krasnodar	2015–16	Russian Premier League	29	10	4	1	11	6	–		44	17
Krasnodar	2016–17	Russian Premier League	12	1	1	0	3	0	–		16	1
Krasnodar	2017–18	Russian Premier League	19	3	1	1	3	1	–		23	5
Krasnodar	2018–19	Russian Premier League	10	3	1	0	2	0	–		13	3
Krasnodar	Total		112	25	11	3	23	7	0	0	146	35
Rostov	2019–20	Russian Premier League	7	2	–		–		–		7	2
Rostov	2020–21	Russian Premier League	13	2	0	0	0	0	–		13	2
Rostov	2021–22	Russian Premier League	6	0	0	0	–		–		6	0
Rostov	Total		26	4	0	0	0	0	0	0	26	4
Khimki	2021–22	Russian Premier League	1	0	–		–		–		1	0
Career total			311	38	34	6	58	7	3	0	406	51

== Honours ==
CSKA Moscow

- Russian Premier League: 2012–13
- Russian Cup: 2008–09, 2010–11, 2012–13
- Russian Super Cup: 2009, 2013

Individual

- In the list of 33 best football players of the championship of Russia: 2010
