= Vladimir Medved =

Belarusian footballer

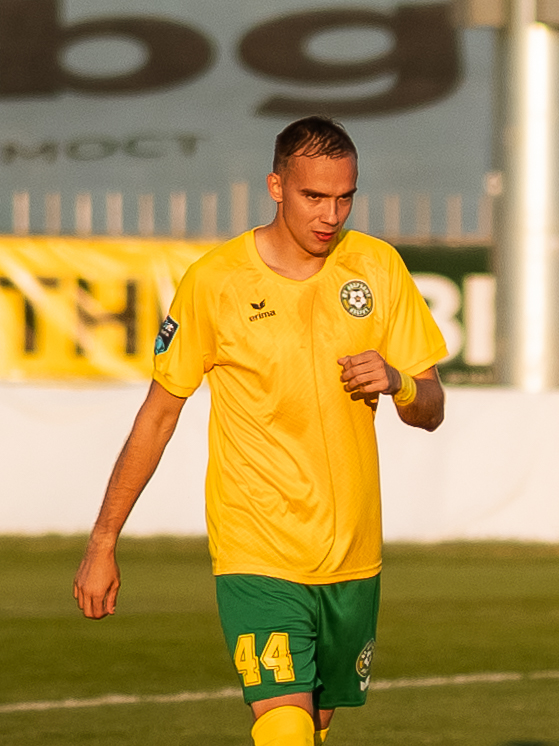
- Medved playing for Dobrudzha in 2026.

Personal information
- Date of birth: 4 November 1999 (age 27)
- Place of birth: Minsk, Belarus
- Height: 1.80 m (5 ft 11 in)
- Position: Midfielder

Team information
- Current team: Dobrudzha
- Number: 44

Youth career
- 2015–2016: Akademiya Futbola Rostov
- 2016–2017: Slavia Mozyr

Senior career*
Years	Team	Apps	(Gls)
2017	Naftan Novopolotsk	6	(0)
2018	Dinamo Brest	1	(0)
2019	Slutsk	4	(0)
2019	Rostov	0	(0)
2020	Krylia Sovetov Samara	0	(0)
2020–2021	Rotor Volgograd	3	(0)
2021	Atyrau	2	(0)
2022	Sioni Bolnisi	3	(0)
2023–2024	Pirin Blagoevgrad	13	(0)
2024	→ Lokomotiv Plovdiv (loan)	8	(0)
2024–2025	Lokomotiv Plovdiv	23	(1)
2025–2026	Slavia Sofia	12	(0)
2026–	Dobrudzha	6	(0)
- * Club domestic league appearances and goals as of 22 September 2026

Vladimir Medved (Belarusian: Уладзімір Мядзведзь; Russian: Владимир Сергеевич Медведь; born 4 November 1999) is a Belarusian professional footballer who plays as a midfielder for Bulgarian Second League club Dobrudzha Dobrich.

== Club career ==
On 12 July 2019, he signed with Russian Premier League club FC Rostov. He played for Rostov's Under-20 squad in the first half of the 2019–20 season, making 16 appearances and scoring 4 goals. On 10 February 2020, he was included in the Under-20 squad of another Russian club PFC Krylia Sovetov Samara for the pre-season FNL Cup, and on 12 February 2020 he was removed by Rostov from their squad. On 21 February 2020 he was registered with the RPL as Krylia Sovetov player. He left Krylia Sovetov on 31 May 2020.

He made his debut for the main squad of FC Rotor Volgograd on 21 October 2020 in a Russian Cup game against PFC Krylia Sovetov Samara. He made his Russian Premier League debut for Rotor on 17 March 2021 against FC Rostov.
