= Aleksey Kornienko =

Russian footballer

Personal information
- Full name: Aleksey Alekseyevich Kornienko
- Date of birth: 15 January 2003 (age 23)
- Height: 1.80 m (5 ft 11 in)
- Positions: Defender; midfielder

Senior career*
Years	Team	Apps	(Gls)
2020–2022	FC Rostov	1	(0)
- * Club domestic league appearances and goals as of 21 May 2022

Aleksey Alekseyevich Kornienko (Russian: Алексей Алексеевич Корниенко; born 15 January 2003) is a Russian footballer who plays as a defender.

== Club career ==
He made his debut in the Russian Premier League for FC Rostov on 19 June 2020 in a game against PFC Sochi. FC Rostov was forced to field their under-18 squad in that game, as their main squad was quarantined after six players had tested positive for COVID-19.
