= Kirill Girnyk =

Russian footballer

Personal information
- Full name: Kirill Ivanovich Girnyk
- Date of birth: 31 March 2003 (age 23)
- Height: 1.81 m (5 ft 11 1/2 in)
- Position: Midfielder

Youth career
- Rostov

Senior career*
Years	Team	Apps	(Gls)
2020–2023	Rostov	1	(0)
2023	Chelyabinsk	1	(0)
2024	Rostov-2	25	(0)
- * Club domestic league appearances and goals as of 16 November 2024

Kirill Ivanovich Girnyk (Russian: Кирилл Иванович Гирнык; born 31 March 2003) is a Russian football player.

== Club career ==
He made his debut in the Russian Premier League for Rostov on 19 June 2020 in a game against Sochi. FC Rostov was forced to field their Under-18 squad in that game as their main squad was quarantined after 6 players tested positive for COVID-19.
