= Aleksandr Saplinov =

Russian footballer (born 1997)

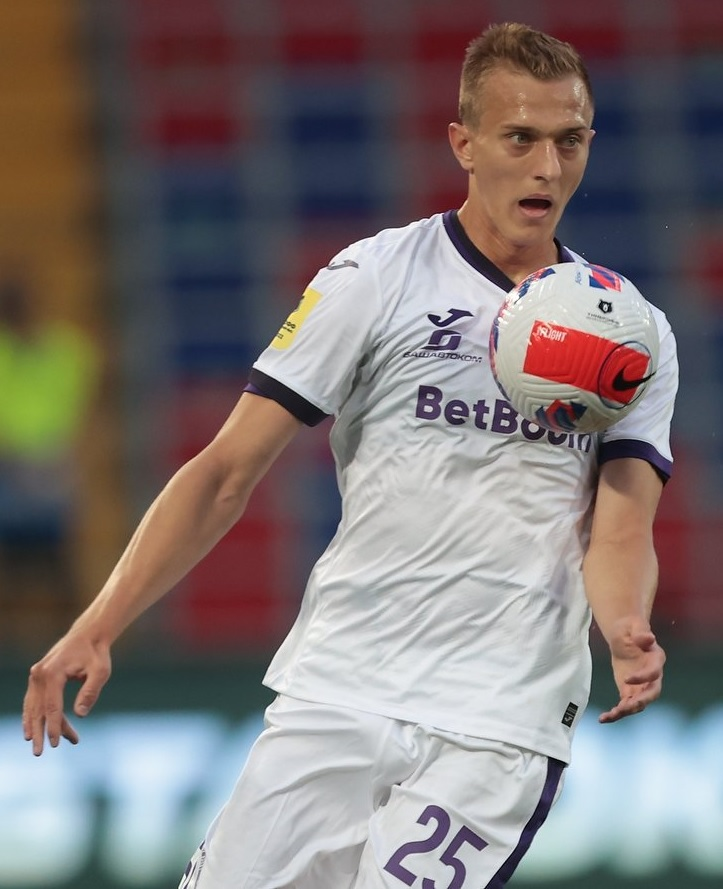
- Saplinov with FC Ufa in 2021

Personal information
- Full name: Aleksandr Yuryevich Saplinov
- Date of birth: 12 August 1997 (age 29)
- Place of birth: Stary Oskol, Russia
- Height: 1.95 m (6 ft 5 in)
- Position: Forward

Team information
- Current team: FC Volga Ulyanovsk
- Number: 50

Youth career
- –2016: FC Metallurg Stary Oskol
- 2016: FC Energomash Belgorod

Senior career*
Years	Team	Apps	(Gls)
2016–2017	FC Energomash Belgorod	39	(8)
2018	FC Sokol Saratov	14	(7)
2019	FC Baltika Kaliningrad	13	(6)
2019–2023	FC Rostov	24	(2)
2020	→ FC Rotor Volgograd (loan)	1	(0)
2021–2022	→ FC Ufa (loan)	19	(0)
2022–2023	→ FC Rubin Kazan (loan)	5	(0)
2023–2026	FC Spartak Kostroma	68	(17)
2026–	FC Volga Ulyanovsk	9	(0)
- * Club domestic league appearances and goals as of 16 May 2026

Aleksandr Yuryevich Saplinov (Russian: Александр Юрьевич Саплинов; born 12 August 1997) is a Russian football player who plays for FC Volga Ulyanovsk. His main position is winger, and he also plays attacking midfielder and centre-forward.

== Club career ==
He made his debut in the Russian Professional Football League for FC Energomash Belgorod on 20 July 2016 in a game against FC Avangard Kursk.

On 11 June 2019, he signed a 4-year contract with FC Rostov. He made his debut in the Russian Premier League for Rostov on 20 July 2019 in a game against FC Spartak Moscow, as an 80th-minute substitute for Ivelin Popov. In his first start for Rostov against FC Rubin Kazan on 25 August 2019, he scored a goal in the 87th minute, giving his club a 2–1 victory.

On 20 August 2020, he joined FC Rotor Volgograd on loan for the 2020–21 season. On 13 January 2021, the loan was terminated early.

On 24 June 2021, he moved to FC Ufa on loan with an option to buy. On 14 July 2022, Saplinov was loaned to FC Rubin Kazan. He suffered a Jones fracture in August 2022. He did not appear for Rubin after that and officially left the club on 6 June 2023.

== Career statistics ==
As of 28 May 2022

Club	Season	League			Cup		Continental		Total	
Club	Season	Division	Apps	Goals	Apps	Goals	Apps	Goals	Apps	Goals
Energomash Belgorod	2016–17	PFL	22	5	4	0	–		26	5
Energomash Belgorod	2017–18	PFL	17	3	3	0	–		20	3
Energomash Belgorod	Total		39	8	7	0	0	0	46	8
Sokol Saratov	2018–19	PFL	14	7	1	0	–		15	7
Baltika Kaliningrad	2018–19	FNL	13	6	–		–		13	6
Rostov	2019–20	RPL	21	1	2	1	–		23	2
Rostov	2020–21	RPL	3	1	0	0	–		3	1
Rostov	Total		24	2	2	1	0	0	26	3
Rotor Volgograd (loan)	2020–21	RPL	1	0	1	0	–		2	0
Ufa (loan)	2021–22	RPL	19	0	1	0	–		20	0
Career total			110	23	12	1	0	0	122	24
