= Aleksandr Koryakin =

Russian football player

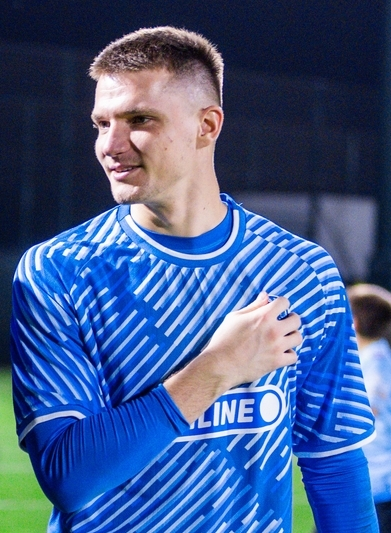

Personal information
- Full name: Aleksandr Vasilyevich Koryakin
- Date of birth: 10 March 2002 (age 24)
- Place of birth: Nizhny Novgorod, Russia
- Height: 1.88 m (6 ft 2 in)
- Position: Goalkeeper

Team information
- Current team: Krasnodar
- Number: 16

Youth career
- –2021: Lokomotiv Moscow

Senior career*
Years	Team	Apps	(Gls)
2019–2022	Kazanka Moscow	15	(0)
2022–2024	Baltika-2 Kaliningrad	14	(0)
2022–2024	Baltika Kaliningrad	0	(0)
2024	→ Rodina Moscow (loan)	13	(0)
2024	Rodina-2 Moscow	3	(0)
2024–2025	Rodina Moscow	25	(0)
2025–	Krasnodar	0	(0)
- * Club domestic league appearances and goals as of 18 June 2025

Aleksandr Vasilyevich Koryakin (Russian: Александр Васильевич Корякин; born 10 March 2002) is a Russian football goalkeeper who plays for club Krasnodar.

== Club career ==
On 18 June 2025, Koryakin signed a four-year contract with Russian Premier League club Krasnodar.

== Career statistics ==
As of match played 27 October 2026

Appearances and goals by club, season and competition
Club	Season	League			Cup		Other		Total	
Club	Season	Division	Apps	Goals	Apps	Goals	Apps	Goals	Apps	Goals
Kazanka Moscow	2019–20	Russian Second League	0	0	—		—		0	0
Kazanka Moscow	2020–21	Russian Second League	1	0	—		—		1	0
Kazanka Moscow	2021–22	Russian Second League	14	0	—		—		14	0
Kazanka Moscow	Total		15	0	—		—		15	0
Baltika-2 Kaliningrad	2022–23	Russian Second League	10	0	—		—		10	0
Baltika-2 Kaliningrad	2023	Russian Second League B	4	0	—		—		4	0
Baltika-2 Kaliningrad	Total		14	0	—		—		14	0
Baltika Kaliningrad	2022–23	Russian First League	0	0	0	0	—		0	0
Baltika Kaliningrad	2023–24	Russian Premier League	0	0	0	0	—		0	0
Baltika Kaliningrad	Total		0	0	0	0	—		0	0
Rodina Moscow (loan)	2023–24	Russian First League	13	0	0	0	—		13	0
Rodina Moscow	2024–25	Russian First League	25	0	0	0	—		25	0
Rodina-2 Moscow	2024	Russian Second League B	3	0	—		—		3	0
Krasnodar	2025–26	Russian Premier League	0	0	7	0	0	0	7	0
Krasnodar	2026–27	Russian Premier League	0	0	5	0	—		5	0
Krasnodar	Total		0	0	12	0	0	0	12	0
Career total			70	0	12	0	0	0	82	0
