= Igor Andreyev =

Russian footballer

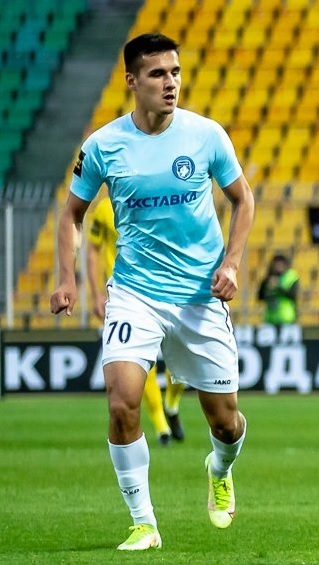
- Andreyev with Rodina Moscow in 2022

Personal information
- Full name: Igor Andreyevich Andreyev
- Date of birth: 15 August 2001 (age 25)
- Place of birth: Sterlitamak, Russia
- Height: 1.87 m (6 ft 2 in)
- Position: Forward

Team information
- Current team: Rodina-3 Moscow
- Number: 99

Youth career
- –2020: Ufa
- 2021: Krasnodar

Senior career*
Years	Team	Apps	(Gls)
2018–2020	Ufa-2	19	(4)
2020	Nosta Novotroitsk	13	(9)
2021–2022	Krasnodar-2	4	(0)
2021–2022	→ Rodina Moscow (loan)	28	(10)
2022–2024	Rodina Moscow	32	(4)
2022–2025	Rodina-2 Moscow	2	(0)
2023–2024	→ Shinnik Yaroslavl (loan)	27	(11)
2026	Rodina-2 Moscow	7	(1)
2026–	Rodina-3 Moscow	2	(1)
- * Club domestic league appearances and goals as of 31 October 2026

Igor Andreyevich Andreyev (Russian: Игорь Андреевич Андреев; born 15 August 2001) is a Russian football player who plays for Rodina-3 Moscow.

== Club career ==
On 12 January 2021, he signed a 4.5-year contract with Krasnodar.

He made his debut in the Russian Football National League for Krasnodar-2 on 6 March 2021 in a game against Veles Moscow.
