= Artur Garibyan =

Armenian footballer (born 2006)

Personal information
- Full name: Artur Tigranovich Garibyan
- Date of birth: 29 July 2006 (age 20)
- Place of birth: Moscow, Russia
- Height: 1.94 m (6 ft 4 in)
- Position: Centre-forward

Team information
- Current team: Rodina Moscow
- Number: 77

Youth career
- Rodina Moscow

Senior career*
| Years | Team | Apps | (Gls) |
| 2023–2024 | Rodina-M Moscow | 39 | (6) |
| 2025 | Rodina-2 Moscow | 11 | (0) |
| 2025– | Rodina Moscow | 17 | (3) |
| 2025–2026 | → Spartak Kostroma (loan) | 15 | (5) |

International career^{‡}
| 2022 | Armenia U17 | 2 | (2) |
| 2024 | Armenia U19 | 3 | (1) |
| 2025– | Armenia U21 | 4 | (1) |
| 2026– | Armenia | 5 | (2) |
- * Club domestic league appearances and goals as of 22 November 2026 ‡ National team caps and goals as of 15 November 2026

Artur Tigranovich Garibyan (Armenian: Արթուր Ղարիբյան; Russian: Артур Тигранович Гарибян; born 29 July 2006) is a football player who plays as a centre-forward for Rodina Moscow. Born in Russia, he plays for the Armenia national team.

== Club career ==
Garibyan was raised in the academy of Rodina Moscow and made his senior debut in 2023 for their second reserve team in the fourth-tier Russian Second League B.

Before the 2025–26 Russian First League season, Rodina loaned Garibyan to a league competitor Spartak Kostroma. Garibyan established himself as a regular for Spartak and scored 5 goals in the first part of the season, with Rodina terminating the loan early in the winter. He was moved to Rodina's senior team and started appearing regularly as a late substitute, as Rodina won the league and was promoted to the Russian Premier League for the first time in history.

Garibyan made his Russian Premier League debut for Rodina on 31 July 2026 in a game against Rostov. On 9 August 2026, he scored twice in the Rodina's 2–1 away victory over the reigning champions Zenit to bring Rodina their first RPL points.

== International career ==
On 25 September 2026, Garibyan made his debut for Armenia national team in a 2026–27 UEFA Nations League C game against Latvia. He scored Armenia's second goal of the 2–0 victory, six minutes after coming on as a substitute.

== Career statistics ==
As of 22 November 2026

| Club | Season | League | | | Cup | | Total | |
| Club | Season | Division | Apps | Goals | Apps | Goals | Apps | Goals |
|---|---|---|---|---|---|---|---|---|
| Rodina-M Moscow | 2023 | Russian Second League B | 14 | 1 | — | | 14 | 1 |
| Rodina-M Moscow | 2024 | Russian Second League B | 25 | 5 | — | | 25 | 5 |
| Rodina-M Moscow | Total | | 39 | 6 | 0 | 0 | 39 | 6 |
| Rodina-2 Moscow | 2024–25 | Russian Second League A | 11 | 0 | — | | 11 | 0 |
| Spartak Kostroma (loan) | 2025–26 | Russian First League | 15 | 5 | 1 | 0 | 16 | 5 |
| Rodina Moscow | 2025–26 | Russian First League | 9 | 1 | — | | 9 | 1 |
| Rodina Moscow | 2026–27 | Russian Premier League | 8 | 2 | 5 | 1 | 13 | 3 |
| Rodina Moscow | Total | | 17 | 3 | 5 | 1 | 22 | 4 |
| Career total | | | 82 | 14 | 6 | 1 | 88 | 15 |

=== International ===
As of match played 15 November 2026

Appearances and goals by national team and year
| National team | Year | Apps | Goals |
|---|---|---|---|
| Armenia | 2026 | 5 | 2 |
| Total | | 5 | 2 |

Scores and results list Armenia's goal tally first, score column indicates score after each Garibyan goal.

List of international goals scored by Artur Garibyan
| No. | Date | Venue | Opponent | Score | Result | Competition |
|---|---|---|---|---|---|---|
| 1 | 25 September 2026 | Vazgen Sargsyan Republican Stadium, Yerevan, Armenia | Latvia | 2–0 | 2–0 | 2026–27 UEFA Nations League C |
| 2 | 12 November 2026 | Vazgen Sargsyan Republican Stadium, Yerevan, Armenia | Cyprus | 1–1 | 1–1 | 2026–27 UEFA Nations League C |
