= Aleksandr Dimidko =

Russian footballer (born 1986)

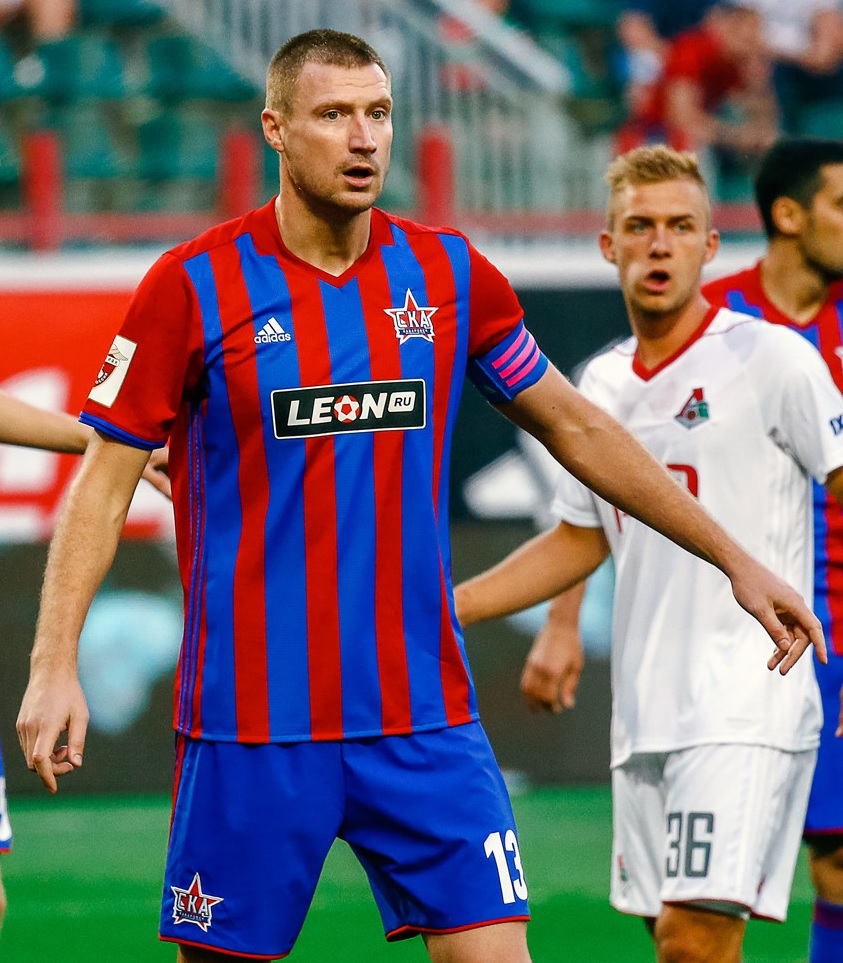
- Dimidko with SKA-Khabarovsk in 2017

Personal information
- Full name: Aleksandr Aleksandrovich Dimidko
- Date of birth: 20 January 1986 (age 40)
- Place of birth: Khabarovsk, Soviet Union
- Height: 1.95 m (6 ft 5 in)
- Positions: Defender; midfielder

Team information
- Current team: FC Rodina-3 Moscow (head coach)

Senior career*
Years	Team	Apps	(Gls)
2003–2007	FC SKA-Energiya Khabarovsk	132	(17)
2007–2010	FC Dynamo Moscow	29	(4)
2010	→ FC SKA-Energiya Khabarovsk (loan)	20	(3)
2010–2012	FC Dynamo Bryansk	56	(7)
2012–2013	FC Tom Tomsk	30	(10)
2013–2014	FC Mordovia Saransk	31	(2)
2014–2015	FC Tom Tomsk	22	(2)
2015	FC Arsenal Tula	15	(0)
2016–2018	FC SKA-Khabarovsk	56	(1)
2018–2019	FC Khimki	24	(2)
2019	FC Ararat Moscow	4	(1)

Managerial career
- 2019–2021: FC SKA-Khabarovsk (assistant)
- 2021: FC Rodina Moscow (assistant)
- 2021–2022: FC Dynamo Bryansk (assistant)
- 2022–2023: FC Rodina-2 Moscow (assistant)
- 2023–2025: FC Rodina Moscow (assistant)
- 2025: FC Khimki (assistant)
- 2025–2026: FC Rodina-2 Moscow (assistant)
- 2026–: FC Rodina-3 Moscow
- * Club domestic league appearances and goals

Aleksandr Aleksandrovich Dimidko (Russian: Александр Александрович Димидко; born 20 January 1986) is a Russian football coach and a former player who is the head coach of FC Rodina-3 Moscow. He played as a centre-back.

== Club career ==
=== Career statistics ===
As of 8 December 2017

Club	Season	League			Cup		Continental		Other		Total	
Club	Season	Division	Apps	Goals	Apps	Goals	Apps	Goals	Apps	Goals	Apps	Goals
FC SKA-Energia Khabarovsk	2004	First Division	40	3	2	1	–		–		42	4
FC SKA-Energia Khabarovsk	2005	First Division	40	6	0	0	–		–		40	6
FC SKA-Energia Khabarovsk	2006	First Division	37	7	0	0	–		–		37	7
FC SKA-Energia Khabarovsk	2007	First Division	15	1	0	0	–		–		15	1
FC Dynamo Moscow	2007	Premier Liga	3	0	1	0	–		–		4	0
FC Dynamo Moscow	2008	Premier Liga	12	2	1	0	–		–		13	2
FC Dynamo Moscow	2009	Premier Liga	14	2	2	0	1	0	–		17	2
FC Dynamo Moscow	2010	Premier Liga	0	0	0	0	–		–		0	0
FC Dynamo Moscow	Total		29	4	4	0	1	0	0	0	34	4
FC SKA-Energia Khabarovsk	2010	First Division	20	3	0	0	–		–		20	3
FC Dynamo Bryansk	2010	First Division	12	3	0	0	–		–		12	3
FC Dynamo Bryansk	2011–12	First Division	44	4	2	1	–		–		46	5
FC Dynamo Bryansk	Total		56	7	2	1	0	0	0	0	58	8
FC Tom Tomsk	2012–13	National League	30	10	1	0	–		–		31	10
FC Mordovia Saransk	2013–14	National League	31	2	3	1	–		–		34	3
FC Tom Tomsk	2014–15	National League	22	2	0	0	–		1 (Note: One appearance in promotion play-offs)	0	23	2
FC Tom Tomsk	Total (2 spells)		52	12	1	0	0	0	1	0	54	12
FC Arsenal Tula	2015–16	National League	15	0	1	0	–		–		16	0
FC SKA-Khabarovsk	2015–16	National League	6	0	0	0	–		–		6	0
FC SKA-Khabarovsk	2016–17	National League	27	0	1	1	–		2 (Note: Two appearances in promotion play-offs)	0	30	1
FC SKA-Khabarovsk	2017–18	Premier Liga	15	1	0	0	–		–		15	1
FC SKA-Khabarovsk	Total (3 spells)		200	21	3	2	0	0	2	0	205	23
Career total			383	46	14	4	1	0	3	0	401	50
