= Maksim Danilin (footballer, born September 2001) =

Russian football player

Personal information
- Full name: Maksim Alekseyevich Danilin
- Date of birth: 13 September 2001 (age 25)
- Place of birth: Moscow, Russia
- Height: 1.65 m (5 ft 5 in)
- Position: Midfielder

Team information
- Current team: Rodina Moscow
- Number: 30

Youth career
- Spartak Moscow

Senior career*
Years	Team	Apps	(Gls)
2019–2022	Spartak-2 Moscow	30	(2)
2021	→ Noah (loan)	4	(0)
2022–	Rodina-2 Moscow	76	(8)
2022–	Rodina Moscow	20	(0)

International career^{‡}
2016–2017	Russia U16	6	(2)
2017	Russia U17	1	(1)
2019	Russia U18	12	(1)
2019	Russia U19	3	(0)
- * Club domestic league appearances and goals as of 15 November 2026 ‡ National team caps and goals as of 14 June 2019

Maksim Alekseyevich Danilin (Russian: Максим Алексеевич Данилин; born 13 September 2001) is a Russian football player who plays for FC Rodina Moscow and Rodina-2 Moscow.

== Club career ==
He made his debut in the Russian Football National League for FC Spartak-2 Moscow on 7 July 2019 in a game against FC Baltika Kaliningrad.

== Career statistics ==
As of 17 May 2026

Club	Season	League			Cup		Other		Total	
Club	Season	Division	Apps	Goals	Apps	Goals	Apps	Goals	Apps	Goals
Spartak-2 Moscow	2019–20	Russian First League	12	2	—		—		12	2
Spartak-2 Moscow	2020–21	Russian First League	9	0	—		—		9	0
Spartak-2 Moscow	2021–22	Russian First League	9	0	—		—		9	0
Spartak-2 Moscow	Total		30	2	0	0	0	0	30	2
Noah (loan)	2020–21	Armenian Premier League	4	0	1	0	—		5	0
Rodina-2 Moscow	2022–23	Russian Second League	21	2	—		—		21	2
Rodina-2 Moscow	2023–24	Russian Second League A	22	3	—		—		22	3
Rodina-2 Moscow	2024–25	Russian Second League A	3	0	—		—		3	0
Rodina-2 Moscow	2025–26	Russian Second League A	18	3	—		—		18	3
Rodina-2 Moscow	Total		64	8	0	0	0	0	64	8
Rodina Moscow	2022–23	Russian First League	2	0	—		1 (Note: Appearance in promotion play-offs)	0	3	0
Rodina Moscow	2023–24	Russian First League	1	0	0	0	—		1	0
Rodina Moscow	2024–25	Russian First League	17	0	1	0	—		18	0
Rodina Moscow	2025–26	Russian First League	0	0	1	0	—		1	0
Rodina Moscow	Total		20	0	2	0	1	0	23	0
Career total			118	10	3	0	1	0	122	10
