= Barseg Kirakosyan =

Armenia international footballer (born 1982)

Personal information
- Full name: Barseg Artyomovich Kirakosyan
- Date of birth: 23 September 1982 (age 44)
- Place of birth: Vladikavkaz, Soviet Union
- Height: 1.80 m (5 ft 11 in)
- Position: Defensive midfielder

Team information
- Current team: Rodina-2 Moscow (manager)

Senior career*
| Years | Team | Apps | (Gls) |
| 2000 | Iriston Vladikavkaz | 32 | (2) |
| 2001 | Alania-d Vladikavkaz (amateur) | | |
| 2002–2005 | Avtodor Vladikavkaz | 83 | (14) |
| 2002 | → Vladikavkaz (loan) (amateur) | | |
| 2005–2007 | Lada Togliatti | 50 | (4) |
| 2007 | KAMAZ Naberezhnye Chelny | 13 | (0) |
| 2008 | Mashuk-KMV Pyatigorsk | 37 | (2) |
| 2009 | FC Khimki | 7 | (0) |
| 2009 | → Metallurg Krasnoyarsk (loan) | 8 | (2) |
| 2010–2012 | Yenisey Krasnoyarsk | 61 | (5) |
| 2012 | Lokomotiv Liski | 10 | (0) |
| 2013–2015 | Mashuk-KMV | 70 | (2) |

International career
| 2004 | Armenia | 4 | (0) |

Managerial career
- 2023–2024: Strogino Moscow (academy)
- 2025–2026: Rodina-M Moscow
- 2026–: Rodina-2 Moscow
- 2026: Rodina Moscow (caretaker)
- * Club domestic league appearances and goals

Barseg Artyomovich Kirakosyan (Armenian: Բարսեղ Կիրակոսյան; Russian: Барсег Артёмович Киракосян; born on 23 September 1982) is a football coach and a former player who is the manager of Rodina-2 Moscow. He made four appearances for the Armenia national team.

== International career ==
Kirakosyan was a member of the Armenia national team, and participated in four international matches since his debut in a friendly an away game against Hungary on 18 February 2004.

== Coaching career ==
On 21 September 2026, Kirakosyan was appointed caretaker manager by Russian Premier League club Rodina Moscow.

== Personal life ==
Kirakosyan He also holds Russian citizenship.

== Career statistics ==
Armenia national team
| Year | Apps | Goals |
|---|---|---|
| 2004 | 4 | 0 |
| Total | 4 | 0 |
