= Aleksandr Gapechkin =

Russian footballer

Personal information
- Full name: Aleksandr Igorevich Gapechkin
- Date of birth: 16 June 2002 (age 24)
- Height: 1.81 m (5 ft 11 in)
- Position: Right-back

Team information
- Current team: Tekstilshchik Ivanovo
- Number: 2

Youth career
- Rostov

Senior career*
Years	Team	Apps	(Gls)
2019–2021	Rostov	1	(0)
2021	Valmiera	5	(0)
2022	Valmiera II	8	(0)
2022–2023	Volga Ulyanovsk	2	(0)
2023	→ Rodina-2 Moscow (loan)	3	(0)
2023	Rodina-2 Moscow	0	(0)
2023	Rodina-M Moscow	16	(1)
2024–2026	Rodina-2 Moscow	44	(0)
2025–2026	Rodina Moscow	3	(0)
2025–2026	→ Chelyabinsk (loan)	13	(0)
2026	→ Chayka Peschanokopskoye (loan)	13	(0)
2026–	Tekstilshchik Ivanovo	0	(0)
- * Club domestic league appearances and goals as of 16 May 2026

Aleksandr Igorevich Gapechkin (Russian: Александр Игоревич Гапечкин; born 16 June 2002) is a Russian football player who plays for Tekstilshchik Ivanovo.

== Club career ==
He made his debut in the Russian Premier League for Rostov on 18 October 2020 in a game against Akhmat Grozny.
