= 2024–25 FC SKA-Khabarovsk season =

FC SKA-Khabarovsk
2024–25 season
- Manager: Dmitri Voyetskiy
- Stadium: Saturn Stadium
- Russian First League: 13th
- Russian Cup: Pre-season
- Biggest win: Sochi 1–2 SKA-Khabarovsk
- Biggest defeat: Torpedo Moscow 4–0 SKA-Khabarovsk

The 2024–25 season is the 79th season in the history of FC SKA-Khabarovsk, and the club's seventh consecutive season in the Russian First League. In addition to the domestic league, the team is scheduled to participate in the Russian Cup.

== Transfers ==
=== In ===
Pos.	Player	Transferred from	Fee	Date	Source
DF	(Russia) Nikolai Poyarkov	(Russia) Rostov	Loan	25 July 2024	

== Friendlies ==
=== Pre-season ===
28 June 2024 Friendly	Khimki (Russia)	4–1	(Russia) SKA-Khabarovsk	Moscow
12:00				Stadium: UTC Kratovo

2 July 2024 Friendly	Baltika Kaliningrad (Russia)	1–0	(Russia) SKA-Khabarovsk

=== Mid-season ===
23 January 2025 Friendly	SKA-Khabarovsk (Russia)	0–1	(Bulgaria) Lokomotiv Sofia

== Competitions ==
=== Overall record ===
Competition	First match	Last match	Starting round	Record							
Competition	First match	Last match	Starting round	Pld	W	D	L	GF	GA	GD	Win %
Russian First League	14 July 2024		Matchday 1	4	1	0	3	2	9	−7	25.00
Russian Cup				0	0	0	0	0	0	+0	—
Total				4	1	0	3	2	9	−7	25.00

Last updated: 3 August 2024
Source: Soccerway

=== Russian First League ===
==== League table ====
Pos	Team	Pld	W	D	L	GF	GA	GD	Pts	Promotion, qualification or relegation
4	Ural Yekaterinburg	34	16	11	7	50	38	+12	59	Qualification to Premier League play-offs
5	Sochi (O, P)	34	16	9	9	55	34	+21	57	Qualification to Premier League play-offs
6	SKA-Khabarovsk	34	15	8	11	44	41	+3	53	
7	Rodina Moscow	34	13	11	10	41	31	+10	50	
8	Yenisey Krasnoyarsk	34	14	7	13	36	39	−3	49	

Source: Soccerway
Rules for classification: 1) Points; 2) Head-to-head points; 3) Head-to-head matches won; 4) Head-to-head goal difference; 5) Head-to-head goals scored; 6) Head-to-head away goals scored; 7) Matches won; 8) Goal difference; 9) Goals scored; 10) Away matches won; 11) Away goals scored; 12) Best disciplinary record (3 points for red card, 1 point for yellow card); 13) Drawing lots. If teams tied on points did not play an equal number of head-to-head games, head-to-head criteria and disciplinary record are not used for positioning. If 1st- and 2nd-placed teams are tied in the final standings on the first 12 criteria, a winner is determined in an additional play-off game, with no extra time and a penalty-shootout if tied at the end of regulation, instead of drawing lots.
(O) Play-off winners; (P) Promoted

==== Results summary ====
Overall								Home						Away					
Pld	W	D	L	GF	GA	GD	Pts	W	D	L	GF	GA	GD	W	D	L	GF	GA	GD
4	1	0	3	2	9	−7	3	0	0	1	0	3	−3	1	0	2	2	6	−4

Last updated: 3 August 2024.

==== Results by round ====
Round	1	2	3	4	5
Ground	A	A	A	H	H
Result	L	L	W	L	
Position	18				

Updated to match(es) played on 3 August 2024. Source:
A = Away; H = Home; W = Win; D = Draw; L = Loss

==== Matches ====
The tentative match schedule was released on 27 June.

14 July 2024 1	Torpedo Moscow	4–0	SKA-Khabarovsk	Khimki
18:30 UTC+3	Chervyakov 21'; Ćurić 47'; Gorbunov 81'; Shitov 85'			Stadium: Arena Khimki; Attendance: 1,420; Referee: Ivan Sidenkov

20 July 2024 2	Rodina Moscow	1–0	SKA-Khabarovsk	Moscow
20:00 UTC+3			Reyna 22'	Stadium: Sapsan Arena; Attendance: 587; Referee: German Kovalenko

28 July 2024 3	Sochi	1–2	SKA-Khabarovsk	Sochi
19:00 UTC+3	Kozhemyakin 90'		Gongadze 43'; Aliyev 79'	Stadium: Fisht Olympic Stadium; Attendance: 5,633; Referee: Vladimir Falov

3 August 2024 4	SKA-Khabarovsk	0–3	Alania Vladikavkaz	Ramenskoye
16:00 UTC+3			Gagloev 21'; Dolgov 35', 60'	Stadium: Saturn Stadium; Attendance: 337; Referee: Ivan Saraev

10 August 2024 5	SKA-Khabarovsk	v	Shinnik Yaroslavl	Ramenskoye
16:00 UTC+3				Stadium: Saturn Stadium
