= Dmitri Tananeyev =

Russian footballer

Personal information
- Full name: Dmitri Dmitriyevich Tananeyev
- Date of birth: 12 May 1998 (age 28)
- Place of birth: Tunis, Tunisia
- Height: 1.92 m (6 ft 4 in)
- Position: Defender

Team information
- Current team: Rodina Moscow
- Number: 19

Youth career
- Lokomotiv Moscow
- SFC Kvadro Rostov-on-Don
- MITOS Novocherkassk
- –2015: FShM Moscow
- 2016–2018: Rostov

Senior career*
| Years | Team | Apps | (Gls) |
| 2019 | Chayka Peschanokopskoye | 0 | (0) |
| 2019–2020 | Nosta Novotroitsk | 15 | (0) |
| 2020–2021 | Shinnik Yaroslavl | 16 | (1) |
| 2021–2022 | Rodina Moscow | 8 | (1) |
| 2022–2025 | Rodina-2 Moscow | 54 | (0) |
| 2024– | Rodina Moscow | 15 | (1) |
| 2024–2025 | → KAMAZ Naberezhnye Chelny (loan) | 25 | (1) |
| 2025–2026 | → KAMAZ Naberezhnye Chelny (loan) | 10 | (0) |
- * Club domestic league appearances and goals as of 24 October 2026

Dmitri Dmitriyevich Tananeyev (Russian: Дмитрий Дмитриевич Тананеев; born 12 May 1998) is a Russian football player who plays for Rodina Moscow.

== Career ==
Tananeyev made his debut in the Russian Football National League for Shinnik Yaroslavl on 8 August 2020 in a game against Akron Tolyatti, he substituted Ivan Oleynikov in the 90th minute.

He made his Russian Premier League debut for Rodina Moscow on 9 August 2026 against Zenit St. Petersburg.

== Career statistics ==
As of 28 October 2026

| Club | Season | League | | | Cup | | Total | |
| Club | Season | Division | Apps | Goals | Apps | Goals | Apps | Goals |
|---|---|---|---|---|---|---|---|---|
| Chayka | 2018–19 | Russian Second League | 0 | 0 | — | | 0 | 0 |
| Nosta Novotroitsk | 2019–20 | Russian Second League | 15 | 0 | 2 | 0 | 17 | 0 |
| Shinnik Yaroslavl | 2020–21 | Russian First League | 16 | 1 | 1 | 0 | 17 | 1 |
| Rodina Moscow | 2021–22 | Russian Second League | 8 | 1 | 0 | 0 | 8 | 1 |
| Rodina Moscow | 2023–24 | Russian First League | 7 | 0 | 1 | 0 | 8 | 0 |
| Rodina Moscow | 2024–25 | Russian First League | 0 | 0 | — | | 0 | 0 |
| Rodina Moscow | 2025–26 | Russian First League | 4 | 1 | — | | 4 | 1 |
| Rodina Moscow | 2026–27 | Russian Premier League | 4 | 0 | 5 | 0 | 9 | 0 |
| Rodina Moscow | Total | | 23 | 2 | 6 | 0 | 29 | 2 |
| Rodina-2 Moscow | 2022–23 | Russian Second League | 31 | 0 | — | | 31 | 0 |
| Rodina-2 Moscow | 2023–24 | Russian Second League A | 23 | 0 | — | | 23 | 0 |
| Rodina-2 Moscow | Total | | 54 | 0 | 0 | 0 | 54 | 0 |
| KAMAZ (loan) | 2024–25 | Russian First League | 25 | 1 | 0 | 0 | 25 | 1 |
| KAMAZ (loan) | 2025–26 | Russian First League | 10 | 0 | 0 | 0 | 10 | 0 |
| Career total | | | 143 | 4 | 9 | 0 | 152 | 4 |
