= Maksim Turishchev =

Russian footballer (born 2002)

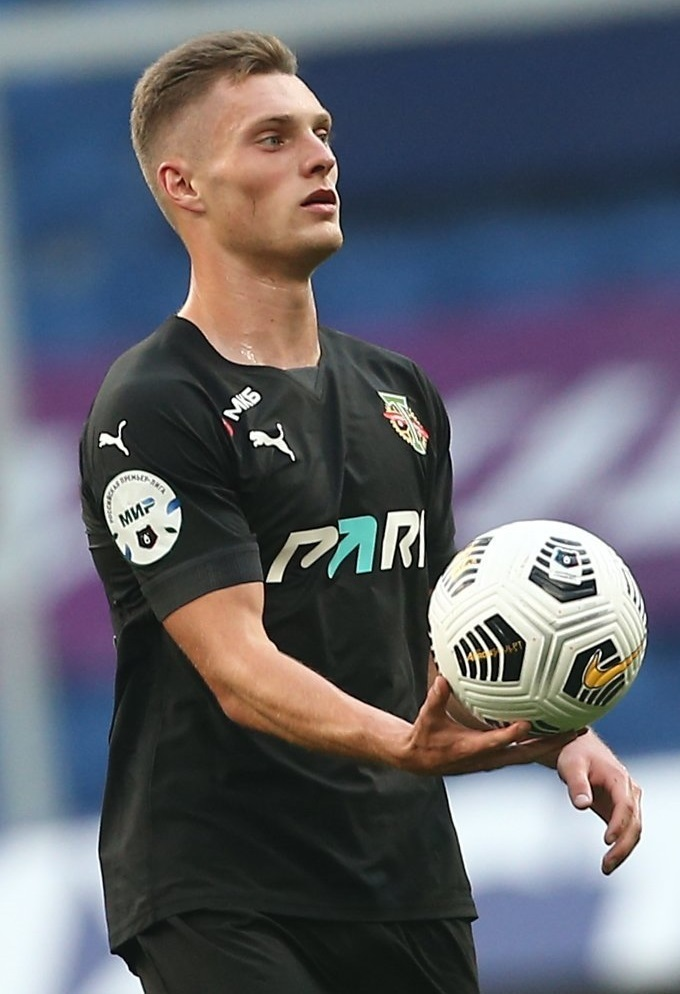
- Turishchev with Torpedo Moscow in 2022

Personal information
- Full name: Maksim Rimovich Turishchev
- Date of birth: 5 March 2002 (age 24)
- Place of birth: Moscow, Russia
- Height: 1.83 m (6 ft 0 in)
- Position: Forward

Team information
- Current team: Fakel Voronezh
- Number: 7

Youth career
- 2009–2020: Lokomotiv Moscow

Senior career*
Years	Team	Apps	(Gls)
2021–2026	Rostov	6	(0)
2022–2023	→ Torpedo Moscow (loan)	25	(0)
2023–2024	→ Rodina Moscow (loan)	19	(4)
2024	→ Arsenal Tula (loan)	18	(5)
2025	→ Rotor Volgograd (loan)	13	(2)
2025–2026	→ Fakel Voronezh (loan)	21	(6)
2026–	Fakel Voronezh	12	(2)

International career
2017–2018	Russia U-16	5	(1)
- * Club domestic league appearances and goals as of 21 November 2026

Maksim Rimovich Turishchev (Russian: Максим Римович Турищев; born 5 March 2002) is a Russian football player who plays as a striker for Fakel Voronezh.

== Club career ==
After spending his junior career with Lokomotiv Moscow, on 3 February 2021 he signed a 4.5-year contract with Rostov.

He made his debut in the Russian Premier League for Rostov on 17 March 2021 in a game against Rotor Volgograd.

On 16 July 2022, Turishchev joined Torpedo Moscow on loan.

On 4 July 2023, Turishchev moved on a new loan to Rodina Moscow.

On 19 July 2024, Turishchev signed with Arsenal Tula.

On 19 June 2025, Turishchev moved on loan to Fakel Voronezh, with an option to buy. On 2 July 2026, Fakel made the transfer permanent and signed a three-year contract with Turishchev.

== Career statistics ==
As of 21 November 2026

Club	Season	League			Cup		Total	
Club	Season	Division	Apps	Goals	Apps	Goals	Apps	Goals
Rostov	2020–21	Russian Premier League	1	0	—		1	0
Rostov	2021–22	Russian Premier League	5	0	2	0	7	0
Rostov	Total		6	0	2	0	8	0
Torpedo Moscow (loan)	2022–23	Russian Premier League	25	0	3	0	28	0
Rodina Moscow (loan)	2023–24	Russian First League	19	4	3	3	22	7
Arsenal Tula (loan)	2024–25	Russian First League	18	5	1	1	19	6
Rotor Volgograd (loan)	2024–25	Russian First League	13	2	—		13	2
Fakel Voronezh (loan)	2025–26	Russian First League	21	6	3	0	24	6
Fakel Voronezh	2026–27	Russian Premier League	12	2	4	1	16	3
Fakel Voronezh	Club total		33	8	7	1	40	9
Career total			114	19	16	5	130	24
