= 2020–21 FC Rostov season =

FC Rostov
2020–21 season
- Chairman: Artashes Arutyunyants
- Manager: Valeri Karpin
- Stadium: Rostov Arena
- Premier League: 9th
- Russian Cup: Round of 16 vs Akhmat Grozny
- UEFA Europa League: Third qualifying round vs Maccabi Haifa
- Top goalscorer: League: Kento Hashimoto and Dmitry Poloz (6); All: Kento Hashimoto and Dmitry Poloz (6)
- Highest home attendance: 32,888 vs Spartak Moscow (4 April 2021)
- Lowest home attendance: 0 vs Maccabi Haifa (24 September 2020)
- Average home league attendance: 12,523 (16 May 2021)
Home colours	Away colours

The 2020–21 season was FC Rostov's 91st season in existence and the club's 12th consecutive season in the top flight of Russian football. In addition to the domestic league, Rostov participated in this season's editions of the Russian Cup and the UEFA Europa League. The season covers the period from 1 August 2020 to 30 June 2021. Rostov finished the season in 9th place, reached the Round of 16 of the Russian Cup, and where knocked out of the UEFA Europa League at the third round stage.

== Season events ==
On 4 August, Rostov announced the signing of Aleksandr Smirnov.

On 10 August, Aleksandr Zuyev moved permanently to Rubin Kazan, where he'd been on loan at the previous season.

On 14 August, Danila Vedernikov joined Volgar Astrakhan on a season-long loan deal, and Björn Bergmann Sigurðarson left the club to re-join Lillestrøm.

On 15 August, Danila Proshlyakov joined Torpedo Moscow on a season-long loan deal.

On 20 August, Rostov announced that Saeid Ezatolahi had left the club to sign for Vejle, and that Aleksandr Saplinov had Rotor Volgograd on a season-long loan deal, with Rostov retaining the possibility of recalling Saplinov during the winter transfer window.

On 23 August, Rostov and Sochi agreed a swap deal with Ivelin Popov joining Sochi and Dmitry Poloz returning to Rostov.

On 2 September, Rostov announced that Aleksandr Pavlovets would join Rostov when his Dynamo Brest contract expires.

On 18 September, Rostov's game against Rotor Volgograd was postponed due to a COVID-19 outbreak within the Rotor Volgograd squad. On 22 September, Rostov were awarded a 3-0 technical victory over Rotor Volgograd.

On 25 September, Konstantin Pliyev was loaned to Ufa for the season.

On 1 October, Eldor Shomurodov left Rostov to sign for Genoa, and Vladimir Obukhov joined Rostov from Tambov.

On 5 October, Sarpsborg 08 announced the signing of Anton Salétros following his release by Rostov.

On 6 October, Yevgeni Chernov left Rostov to sign Krasnodar.

On 14 October, Rostov announced that Pavlovets would be completing his transfer from Dynamo Brest before the end of the current Russian transfer window. The follow day, 15 October, Aleksei Ionov left the club to sign permanently for Krasnodar, Dmitri Chistyakov moved to Zenit St.Petersburg on loan for the remainder of the season with an option for Zenit to make the deal permanent. On the same day, Denis Terentyev returned to Rostov on a permanent deal from Zenit, Pontus Almqvist joined on a five-year contract from IFK Norrköping, as did Armin Gigović from Helsingborgs IF on a similar deal.

On 16 October, Arseny Logashov and Aleksandr Dolgov moved to Khimki on season-long loan deals, and the following day Rostov signed Haitam Aleesami on a contract until the end of the season, and loaned Roman Tugarev from Lokomotiv Moscow for the season.

On 29 December, Danila Proshlyakov returned to Rostov after his loan to Torpedo Moscow was ended.

On 3 February, Maksim Turishchev signed for Rostov on a 4.5-year contract from Lokomotiv Moscow.

On 16 February, Rostov announced the loan signing of Ali Sowe from CSKA Sofia with the option to make the move permanent.

On 23 February, Roman Eremenko left Rostov by mutual consent, and David Toshevski joined Tambov on loan for the remainder of the season.

== Squad ==
As of match played 16 May 2021

No.	Name	Nationality	Position	Date of birth (age)	Signed from	Signed in	Contract ends	Apps.	Goals
Goalkeepers
30	Sergei Pesyakov	(Russia)	GK	16 December 1988 (aged 32)	Spartak Moscow	2017	2022	92	0
77	Maksim Rudakov	(Russia)	GK	22 January 1996 (aged 25)	Zenit St.Petersburg	2020	2024	1	0
Defenders
2	Haitam Aleesami	(Norway)	DF	31 July 1991 (aged 29)	Amiens	2020	2021	14	0
3	Tomas Rukas	(Lithuania)	DF	4 September 1996 (aged 24)	Yenisey Krasnoyarsk	2021		0	0
4	Denis Terentyev	(Russia)	DF	13 August 1992 (aged 28)	Zenit St.Petersburg	2020		65	0
5	Dennis Hadžikadunić	(Bosnia and Herzegovina)	DF	9 July 1998 (aged 22)	Malmö FF	2018		58	3
22	Aleksandr Pavlovets	(Belarus)	DF	13 August 1996 (aged 24)	Dynamo Brest	2020		5	0
34	Aleksei Kozlov	(Russia)	DF	25 December 1986 (aged 34)	Dynamo Moscow	2019		50	1
55	Maksim Osipenko	(Russia)	DF	16 May 1994 (aged 27)	Tambov	2020	2024	39	0
71	Nikolai Poyarkov	(Russia)	DF	16 October 1999 (aged 21)	Lokomotiv Moscow	2019		18	0
96	Aleksandr Gapechkin	(Russia)	DF	16 June 2002 (aged 18)	Academy	2019		1	0
Midfielders
6	Kento Hashimoto	(Japan)	MF	16 August 1993 (aged 27)	FC Tokyo	2020	2024	20	6
8	Armin Gigović	(Sweden)	MF	6 April 2002 (aged 19)	Helsingborgs IF	2020	2025	17	1
10	Pavel Mamayev	(Russia)	MF	17 September 1988 (aged 32)	Krasnodar	2019	2021	20	4
11	Pontus Almqvist	(Sweden)	MF	10 July 1999 (aged 21)	IFK Norrköping	2020	2025	20	1
15	Danil Glebov	(Russia)	MF	3 November 1999 (aged 21)	Anzhi Makhachkala	2019		60	1
17	Mathias Normann	(Norway)	MF	28 May 1996 (aged 24)	Brighton & Hove Albion	2019		52	2
19	Khoren Bayramyan	(Armenia)	MF	7 January 1992 (aged 29)	Academy	2011		120	8
21	Georgi Makhatadze	(Russia)	MF	26 March 1998 (aged 23)	Lokomotiv Moscow	2021	2025	11	1
23	Roman Tugarev	(Russia)	MF	22 July 1998 (aged 22)	Lokomotiv Moscow	2021		16	1
24	Konstantin Kovalyov	(Russia)	MF	14 January 2000 (aged 21)	Avangard Kursk	2020		1	0
25	Kirill Folmer	(Russia)	MF	25 February 2000 (aged 21)	Ufa	2021		6	0
26	Aleksandr Saplinov	(Russia)	MF	12 August 1997 (aged 23)	Baltika Kaliningrad	2019	2023	26	3
Forwards
13	Vladimir Obukhov	(Russia)	FW	8 February 1992 (aged 29)	Tambov	2020		11	0
20	Ali Sowe	(The Gambia)	FW	14 June 1994 (aged 26)	loan from CSKA Sofia	2021	2021	12	3
76	Danila Sukhomlinov	(Russia)	FW	13 August 2002 (aged 18)	Saturn-Master Egorjevsk	2020		3	0
90	Maksim Turishchev	(Russia)	FW	5 March 2002 (aged 19)	Lokomotiv Moscow	2021	2025	1	0
99	Dmitry Poloz	(Russia)	FW	12 July 1991 (aged 29)	Sochi	2020		184	35
Youth team
51	Yevgeni Cherkes	(Russia)	MF	23 June 2001 (aged 19)	Salyut Belgorod	2019		1	0
52	Roman Romanov	(Russia)	MF	28 March 2003 (aged 18)	Academy	2020		1	1
57	Nikita Kolotievskiy	(Russia)	FW	4 March 2001 (aged 20)	Academy	2020		1	0
58	Tamaz Topuria	(Russia)	FW	29 January 2002 (aged 19)	Academy	2020		1	0
60	Pavel Gorelov	(Russia)	MF	22 January 2003 (aged 18)	Academy	2020		1	0
61	Nikita Kashtan	(Russia)	MF	1 September 2003 (aged 17)	Academy	2020		1	0
62	Ivan Komarov	(Russia)	MF	15 April 2003 (aged 18)	Academy	2020		1	0
65	Timofey Kalistratov	(Russia)	DF	18 February 2003 (aged 18)	Academy	2020		1	0
66	William Rogava	(Russia)	DF	25 January 2003 (aged 18)	Academy	2020		1	0
72	Vladimir Abramov	(Russia)	DF	5 April 2002 (aged 19)	Academy	2020		1	0
74	Nikita Kupriyanov	(Russia)	MF	23 April 2002 (aged 19)	Academy	2020		1	0
75	Danil Khromov	(Russia)	FW	25 December 2002 (aged 18)	Academy	2020		1	0
82	Maksim Stavtsev	(Russia)	MF	29 January 2004 (aged 17)	Academy	2020		1	0
84	Aleksey Kornienko	(Russia)	FW	15 January 2003 (aged 18)	Academy	2020		1	0
98	Sergey Kochkanyan	(Russia)	MF	5 May 2003 (aged 18)	Academy	2020		1	0
	Kirill Girnyk	(Russia)	DF	31 March 2003 (aged 18)	Academy	2020		1	0
Out on loan
1	Yegor Baburin	(Russia)	GK	9 August 1993 (aged 27)	Zenit St.Petersburg	2019	2024	16	0
4	Danila Vedernikov	(Russia)	DF	6 June 2001 (aged 19)	Krasnodar	2019		7	0
9	David Toshevski	(North Macedonia)	FW	16 July 2001 (aged 19)	Rabotnički	2020	2025	7	0
12	Aleksandr Smirnov	(Russia)	MF	12 April 1996 (aged 25)	Khimki	2020		1	0
25	Arseny Logashov	(Russia)	DF	18 March 1989 (aged 32)	Baltika Kaliningrad	2018		59	2
47	Aleksandr Dolgov	(Russia)	FW	24 September 1998 (aged 22)	Lokomotiv Moscow	2019	2024	22	1
78	Dmitri Chistyakov	(Russia)	DF	13 January 1994 (aged 27)	Tambov	2019	2023	25	1
83	Artur Sokhiyev	(Russia)	FW	27 September 2002 (aged 18)	Spartak Vladikavkaz	2020		3	0
	Danila Proshlyakov	(Russia)	FW	8 March 2000 (aged 21)	Spartak Moscow	2019	2024	7	0
Left during the season
7	Roman Eremenko	(Finland)	MF	19 March 1987 (aged 34)	Spartak Moscow	2019	2023	48	10
8	Ivelin Popov	(Bulgaria)	MF	26 October 1987 (aged 33)	Spartak Moscow	2019		43	9
11	Aleksei Ionov	(Russia)	MF	18 February 1989 (aged 32)	Dynamo Moscow	2017		87	18
14	Eldor Shomurodov	(Uzbekistan)	FW	29 June 1995 (aged 25)	Bunyodkor	2017	2024	90	18
18	Baktiyar Zaynutdinov	(Kazakhstan)	MF	2 April 1998 (aged 23)	Astana	2019		35	4
23	Aleksandr Zuyev	(Russia)	MF	26 June 1996 (aged 24)	Spartak Moscow	2018		60	4
28	Yevgeni Chernov	(Russia)	DF	23 October 1992 (aged 28)	Zenit St.Petersburg	2019	2022	54	0
33	Konstantin Pliyev	(Russia)	DF	26 October 1996 (aged 24)	Volgar Astrakhan	2018		6	0
46	Denis Popov	(Russia)	GK	29 August 2002 (aged 18)	Academy	2020		1	0
81	Mikhail Osinov	(Russia)	DF	29 December 2000 (aged 20)	Academy	2017		1	0
	Saeid Ezatolahi	(Iran)	MF	1 October 1996 (aged 24)	Atlético Madrid C	2017		18	2
	Anton Salétros	(Sweden)	MF	12 April 1996 (aged 25)	AIK	2018		9	1
	Viðar Örn Kjartansson	(Iceland)	FW	11 March 1990 (aged 31)	Maccabi Tel Aviv	2018		11	2
	Björn Bergmann Sigurðarson	(Iceland)	FW	26 February 1991 (aged 30)	Molde	2018		39	8

=== On loan ===
Note: Flags indicate national team as defined under FIFA eligibility rules; some limited exceptions apply. Players may hold more than one non-FIFA nationality.

No.	Pos.	Nation	Player
4	DF	RUS	Danila Vedernikov (at Volgar Astrakhan)
9	FW	MKD	David Toshevski (at Tambov)
12	MF	RUS	Aleksandr Smirnov (at Orenburg)
25	DF	RUS	Arseny Logashov (at Khimki)

No.	Pos.	Nation	Player
47	FW	RUS	Aleksandr Dolgov (at Khimki)
78	DF	RUS	Dmitri Chistyakov (at Zenit St.Petersburg)
—	FW	RUS	Danila Proshlyakov (at Veles Moscow)

== Transfers ==
=== In ===
Date	Position	Nationality	Name	From	Fee	Ref.
4 August 2020	MF	(Russia)	Aleksandr Smirnov	Khimki	Free	
23 August 2020	FW	(Russia)	Dmitry Poloz	Sochi	Swap	
2 September 2020†	DF	(Belarus)	Aleksandr Pavlovets	Dynamo Brest	Undisclosed	
1 October 2020	FW	(Russia)	Vladimir Obukhov	Tambov	Undisclosed	
15 October 2020	DF	(Russia)	Denis Terentyev	Zenit St.Petersburg	Undisclosed	
15 October 2020	MF	(Sweden)	Pontus Almqvist	IFK Norrköping	Undisclosed	
15 October 2020	MF	(Sweden)	Armin Gigović	Helsingborgs IF	Undisclosed	
17 October 2020	DF	(Norway)	Haitam Aleesami	Amiens	Free	
29 January 2021	DF	(Russia)	Tomas Rukas	Yenisey Krasnoyarsk	Undisclosed	
3 February 2021	FW	(Russia)	Maksim Turishchev	Lokomotiv Moscow	Undisclosed	
12 February 2021	MF	(Russia)	Roman Tugarev	Lokomotiv Moscow	Undisclosed	
21 February 2021	MF	(Russia)	Georgi Makhatadze	Lokomotiv Moscow	Undisclosed	
26 February 2021	MF	(Russia)	Kirill Folmer	Ufa	Undisclosed	

† Pavlovets' move was announced on the above date, and finalised on 14 October 2020.

=== Loans in ===
Date from	Position	Nationality	Name	From	Date to	Ref.
17 October 2020	MF	(Russia)	Roman Tugarev	Lokomotiv Moscow	End of season	
16 February 2021	FW	(The Gambia)	Ali Sowe	CSKA Sofia	End of season	

=== Out ===
Date	Position	Nationality	Name	To	Fee	Ref.
10 August 2020	MF	(Russia)	Aleksandr Zuyev	Rubin Kazan	Undisclosed	
14 August 2020	FW	(Iceland)	Björn Bergmann Sigurðarson	Lillestrøm	Undisclosed	
20 August 2020	MF	(Iran)	Saeid Ezatolahi	Vejle	Undisclosed	
23 August 2020	MF	(Bulgaria)	Ivelin Popov	Sochi	Swap	
28 August 2020	FW	(Iceland)	Viðar Örn Kjartansson	Vålerenga	Undisclosed	
1 October 2020	FW	(Uzbekistan)	Eldor Shomurodov	Genoa	Undisclosed	
6 October 2020	DF	(Russia)	Yevgeni Chernov	Krasnodar	Undisclosed	
15 October 2020	MF	(Russia)	Aleksei Ionov	Krasnodar	Undisclosed	
25 February 2021	MF	(Russia)	Mikhail Osinov	Mashuk-KMV Pyatigorsk	Undisclosed	
26 February 2021	DF	(Russia)	Konstantin Pliyev	Ufa	Undisclosed	

=== Loans out ===
Date from	Position	Nationality	Name	To	Date to	Ref.
Summer 2020	DF	(Russia)	Mikhail Osinov	Nizhny Novgorod	13 January 2021	
14 August 2020	DF	(Russia)	Danila Vedernikov	Volgar Astrakhan	End of season	
15 August 2020	FW	(Russia)	Danila Proshlyakov	Torpedo Moscow	29 December 2020	
20 August 2020	MF	(Russia)	Aleksandr Saplinov	Rotor Volgograd	13 January 2021	
22 September 2020	MF	(Russia)	Konstantin Kovalyov	Baltika Kaliningrad	12 January 2021	
25 September 2020	DF	(Russia)	Konstantin Pliyev	Ufa	26 February 2021	
28 September 2020	MF	(Russia)	Aleksandr Smirnov	Orenburg	End of season	
15 October 2020	DF	(Russia)	Dmitri Chistyakov	Zenit St.Petersburg	End of season	
16 October 2020	DF	(Russia)	Arseny Logashov	Khimki	End of season	
16 October 2020	FW	(Russia)	Aleksandr Dolgov	Khimki	End of season	
12 January 2021	FW	(Russia)	Danila Proshlyakov	Veles Moscow	End of season	
23 February 2021	FW	(North Macedonia)	David Toshevski	Tambov	End of season	
24 February 2021	FW	(Russia)	Artur Sokhiyev	Yessentuki	End of season	
25 February 2021	GK	(Russia)	Yegor Baburin	Krasnodar	End of season	

=== Released ===
Date	Position	Nationality	Name	Joined	Date	Ref.
5 October 2020	MF	(Sweden)	Anton Salétros	Sarpsborg 08	5 October 2020	
15 December 2020	GK	(Russia)	Denis Popov	Valmiera		
23 February 2021	MF	(Finland)	Roman Eremenko			
30 June 2021	DF	(Norway)	Haitam Aleesami	Apollon Limassol	16 August 2021	

== Friendlies ==
20 January 2021	Rostov (Russia)	5–1	(Spain) Algeciras	Marbella, Spain
13:30 MSK (UTC+3)	Sokhiyev (yellow card) 21'; Almqvist 26'; Makhatadze (yellow card) 44'; Gigović 50'; Hadžikadunić 79'; Eremenko 87'; Obukhov 90'	Report	Felice 61'

24 January 2021	Rostov (Russia)	1–0	(Sweden) Östersund	Marbella, Spain
18:30 MSK (UTC+3)	Rukasu (yellow card) 23'; Poloz 27' (pen.); Pavlovets (yellow card) 51'	Report

28 January 2021	Rostov (Russia)	3–1	(Spain) Marbella	Marbella, Spain
13:30 MSK (UTC+3)	Baburin (red card) 2'; Hashimoto 15'; Obukhov (yellow card) 40'; Makhatadze 72'; Pavlovets 81'	Report	53'

4 February 2021	Rostov	0–2	Krasnodar	Marbella, Spain
18:30 MSK (UTC+3)		Report	Suleymanov 61', 68'

11 Tuesday 2021	Rostov (Russia)	0–0	(Spain) Atlético Sanluqueño	Marbella, Spain
14:30 MSK (UTC+3)		Report

11 Tuesday 2021	Rostov (Russia)	4–1	(Georgia (country)) Locomotive Tbilisi	Marbella, Spain
18:30 MSK (UTC+3)	Almqvist 31'; Normann 54' (pen.); Poloz 75', 77'	Report	35'

14 February 2021	Rostov	1–2	Lokomotiv Moscow	Marbella, Spain
17:30 MSK (UTC+3)	Pavlovets (yellow card) 34'; Glebov 79'	Report	Pablo 14'; 23'

== Competitions ==
=== Overview ===
Competition	First match	Last match	Starting round	Final position	Record							
Competition	First match	Last match	Starting round	Final position	Pld	W	D	L	GF	GA	GD	Win %
Premier League	8 August 2020	May 2021	Matchday 1		30	13	4	13	37	35	+2	43.33
Russian Cup	21 February 2021	21 February 2021	Round of 32		1	0	0	1	0	1	−1	0.00
Europa League	24 September 2020		Third qualifying round	Third qualifying round	1	0	0	1	1	2	−1	0.00
Total					32	13	4	15	38	38	+0	40.63

Last updated: 16 May 2021
Source: Competitions

=== Premier League ===
==== League table ====
Pos	Team	Pld	W	D	L	GF	GA	GD	Pts
7	Dynamo Moscow	30	15	5	10	44	33	+11	50 (Note: Head-to-head points: CSKA 3, Dynamo 3. Head-to-head goal difference: CSKA +1, Dynamo -1.)
8	Khimki	30	13	6	11	35	39	−4	45
9	Rostov	30	13	4	13	37	35	+2	43
10	Krasnodar	30	12	5	13	52	45	+7	41
11	Akhmat Grozny	30	11	7	12	36	38	−2	40

Source: Premier Liga
Rules for classification: 1) Points; 2) Head-to-head points; 3) Head-to-head matches won; 4) Head-to-head goal difference; 5) Head-to-head goals scored; 6) Matches won; 7) Goal difference; 8) Goals scored; 9) Play-off.

==== Results summary ====
Overall								Home						Away					
Pld	W	D	L	GF	GA	GD	Pts	W	D	L	GF	GA	GD	W	D	L	GF	GA	GD
30	13	4	13	37	35	+2	43	6	2	7	18	16	+2	7	2	6	19	19	0

Last updated: 16 May 2021.
Source: See Results

==== Results by round ====
Round	1	2	3	4	5	6	7	8	9	10	11	12	13	14	15	16	17	18	19	20	21	22	23	24	25	26	27	28	29	30
Ground	A	H	A	A	H	A	H	H	A	A	H	H	A	A	A	H	H	A	H	A	H	A	H	H	H	A	H	H	A	H
Result	W	L	L	W	W	D	D	W	W	L	W	L	W	L	W	W	L	W	L	D	D	L	W	L	L	L	W	W	L	L
Position	6	7	10	9	6	6	7	7	3	7	5	6	5	6	5	4	5	4	5	5	7	9	7	8	9	9	9	9	9	9

Updated to match(es) played on 16 May 2021. Source: Premier Liga
A = Away; H = Home; W = Win; D = Draw; L = Loss

==== Results ====
8 August 2020 1	Tambov	0–1	Rostov	Saransk
18:30 MSK (UTC+3)	Tetrashvili (yellow card) 38'; Kostyukov (yellow card) 73'	Report	Popov (yellow card) 3'; Mamayev 21'; Zaynutdinov (yellow card) 35'; Hadžikadunić (yellow card) 76'	Stadium: Mordovia Arena; Attendance: 2,468; Referee: Stanislav Vasilyev
Note: Match played at the Mordovia Arena in Saransk instead of Tambov's regular Spartak Stadium.

15 August 2020 2	Rostov	0–2	Zenit Saint Petersburg	Rostov-on-Don
20:00 MSK (UTC+3)	Normann (yellow card) 3'; Chernov (yellow card) 23'	Report	Malcom (yellow card) 1'; Azmoun 24', (yellow card) 70'; Rakitskiy (yellow card) 55' (yellow-red card) 78'; Lovren 87'; Barrios (yellow card) 90+'	Stadium: Rostov Arena; Attendance: 11,353; Referee: Pavel Kukuyan

19 August 2020 3	Dynamo Moscow	2–0	Rostov	Moscow
19:00 MSK (UTC+3)	N'Jie (yellow card) 34'; Philipp 42' (pen.); Komlichenko 45'; Parshivlyuk (yellow card) 60'; Moro (yellow card) 90+4'	Report	Zaynutdinov (yellow card) 16'; Normann (yellow card) 34'; Shomurodov (yellow card) 54'	Stadium: VTB Arena; Attendance: 5,789; Referee: Nikolay Voloshin

23 August 2020 4	Ufa	0–1	Rostov	Ufa
16:30 MSK (UTC+3)	Krotov (red card) 39'; Carp (yellow card) 77'; Agalarov (yellow card) 78'	Report	Hashimoto 79'; Bayramyan (yellow card) 82'; Chernov (yellow card) 90+1'	Stadium: Neftyanik Stadium; Attendance: 3,286; Referee: Mikhail Vilkov

26 August 2020 5	Rostov	1–0	Ural Yekaterinburg	Rostov-on-Don
20:30 MSK (UTC+3)	Hashimoto 59'	Report	Kulakov (yellow card) 52'; Rykov (yellow card) 90+2'	Stadium: Rostov Arena; Attendance: 11,353; Referee: Sergey Lapochkin

30 August 2020 6	Krasnodar	1–1	Rostov	Krasnodar
20:00 MSK (UTC+3)	Petrov (yellow card) 27'; Martynovich (yellow card) 63'; Berg 72'	Report	Eremenko (yellow card) 27'; Normann 64'; Toshevski (yellow card) 90'	Stadium: Krasnodar Stadium; Attendance: 9,136; Referee: Sergei Karasev

14 September 2020 7	Rostov	0–0	Lokomotiv Moscow	Rostov-on-Don
20:30 MSK (UTC+3)	Ionov (yellow card) 77'	Report	Krychowiak (yellow card) 73'; Ignatyev (yellow card) 90+3'	Stadium: Rostov Arena; Attendance: 15,011; Referee: Vladislav Bezborodov

19 September 2020 8	Rostov	3–0	Rotor Volgograd	Rostov-on-Don
19:00 MSK (UTC+3)		Report		Stadium: Rostov Arena
Note: Match originally scheduled for 19 September, but postponed on 18 September due to a COVID-19 within the Rotor squad. Rostov awarded a 3-0 technical victory on 22 September.

27 September 2020 9	Arsenal Tula	2–3	Rostov	Tula
14:00 MSK (UTC+3)	E.Kangwa 9'; Kavalyow (yellow card) 35'; K.Kangwa (yellow card) 38'; Bauer (yellow card) 47'; Kombarov (yellow card) 60'; Kadiri 90+'	Report	Chernov 13' (yellow card) 25'; Ionov (yellow card) 17'; Hashimoto 40', 45' (yellow card) 53'; Bayramyan (yellow card) 47'; Normann (yellow card) 52'; Glebov (yellow card) 54' (yellow-red card) 67'	Stadium: Arsenal Stadium; Attendance: 5,945; Referee: Vitali Meshkov

4 October 2020 10	Sochi	4–2	Rostov	Sochi
16:30 MSK (UTC+3)	Burmistrov 19'; Noboa (yellow card) 63'; Yusupov 66'; Zabolotny 78', 84'	Report	Normann (yellow card) 33' (yellow-red card) 63'; Hadžikadunić (yellow card) 36'; Osipenko (yellow card) 56'; Poloz (yellow card) 59' (goal) 74'; Ionov 62'; Hashimoto (yellow card) 78'; Dolgov (yellow card) 90'	Stadium: Fisht Olympic Stadium; Attendance: 6,199; Referee: Evgeny Turbin

18 October 2020 11	Rostov	3–0	Akhmat Grozny	Rostov-on-Don
19:00 MSK (UTC+3)	Hashimoto 24' (yellow card) 82'; Terentyev (yellow card) 35'; Eremenko 90+'; Glebov 90+'	Report	Shvets (yellow card) 16' (yellow-red card) 75'; Melkadze (penalty missed) 40'	Stadium: Rostov Arena; Attendance: 10,312; Referee: Aleksei Matyunin

25 October 2020 12	Rostov	0–2	Khimki	Rostov-on-Don
16:30 MSK (UTC+3)	Eremenko (yellow card) 26' (red card) 71'; Obukhov (yellow card) 42'	Report	Mirzov (yellow card) 22' (goal) 90+'; Tikhiy (yellow card) 73'; Gapon (yellow card) 87'; Idowu 90+'	Stadium: Rostov Arena; Attendance: 10,879; Referee: Vasily Kazartsev

31 October 2020 13	Spartak Moscow	0–1	Rostov	Moscow
16:30 MSK (UTC+3)	Larsson (yellow card) 41'; Kutepov (yellow card) 55'; Sobolev (yellow card) 58'; Ayrton (yellow card) 90'	Report	Mamayev 26'; Hadžikadunić (yellow card) 42' (yellow-red card) 75'; Kozlov (yellow card) 60'; Poyarkov (yellow card) 61'; Gigović (yellow card) 72'; Terentyev (yellow card) 88'; Glebov (yellow card) 89'	Stadium: Otkritie Arena; Attendance: 2,363; Referee: Vitaly Meshkov

8 November 2020 14	CSKA Moscow	2–0	Rostov	Moscow
16:30 MSK (UTC+3)	Kuchayev 20'; Vasin (yellow card) 59'; Dzagoev (yellow card) 59'; Chalov 74'; Bistrović (yellow card) 90+1'	Report	Eremenko (penalty missed) 61'	Stadium: VEB Arena; Attendance: 6,886; Referee: Aleksei Matyunin

22 November 2020 15	Rubin Kazan	0–2	Rostov	Kazan
19:00 MSK (UTC+3)	Bakayev (yellow card) 34'; Makarov (yellow card) 70'	Report	Aleesami (yellow card) 15'; Normann (yellow card) 31'; Bayramyan 55', 76'	Stadium: Ak Bars Arena; Attendance: 3,011; Referee: Pavel Kukuyan

28 November 2020 16	Rostov	4–1	Dynamo Moscow	Rostov-on-Don
19:00 MSK (UTC+3)	Poloz 35' (pen.), 72' (pen.), 74'; Hadžikadunić (yellow card) 57'; Bayramyan (yellow card) 85'	Report	Szymański (yellow card) 58'; Pliyev (yellow card) 69'; Moro 90+' (pen.)	Stadium: Rostov Arena; Attendance: 12,128; Referee: Sergey Lapochkin

6 December 2020 17	Rostov	0–1	Ufa	Rostov-on-Don
14:00 MSK (UTC+3)	Eremenko (yellow card) 27'; Bayramyan (yellow card) 47'; Normann (yellow card) 58'	Report	Krotov (yellow card) 64'; Andrić 70'; Pliyev (yellow card) 89'; Sysuyev (yellow card) 90+'	Stadium: Rostov Arena; Attendance: 7,192; Referee: Evgeny Kukulyak

13 December 2020 18	Akhmat Grozny	0–1	Rostov	Grozny
19:00 MSK (UTC+3)	Ilyin (yellow card) 66'	Report	Hadžikadunić (yellow card) 13'; Tugarev 82'	Stadium: Akhmat-Arena; Attendance: 6,308; Referee: Nikolay Voloshin

17 December 2020 19	Rostov	1–3	CSKA Moscow	Rostov-on-Don
20:00 MSK (UTC+3)	Sukhomlinov (yellow card) 42'; Poloz (yellow card) 43'; Aleesami (yellow card) 70'; Kozlov 90+1'; Glebov (yellow card) 90+3'	Report	Akhmetov (yellow card) 5'; Chalov 2', 57', 82'; Fernandes (yellow card) 85'; Sigurðsson (yellow card) 90'; Vlašić (yellow card) 90+2'; Gaich (yellow card) 90+3'	Stadium: Rostov Arena; Attendance: 10,743; Referee: Vladimir Moskalyov

27 February 2021 20	Zenit St.Petersburg	2–2	Rostov	Saint Petersburg
16:30 MSK (UTC+3)	Lovren (yellow card) 54'; Kuzyayev (yellow card) 61' (goal) 78'; Poyarkov 73' (o.g.)	Report	Normann (yellow card) 16'; Poyarkov (yellow card) 18'; Sowe (yellow card) 29' (goal) 44', 89'; Almqvist (yellow card) 45+'; Osipenko (red card) 56'; Bayramyan (yellow card) 77'	Stadium: Krestovsky Stadium; Attendance: 23,165; Referee: Aleksei Matyunin

6 March 2021 21	Rostov	0–0	Sochi	Rostov-on-Don
19:00 MSK (UTC+3)	Gigović (yellow card) 28'; Hadžikadunić (yellow card) 37'	Report	A.Zabolotny (yellow card) 40'; Terekhov (yellow card) 63'; Noboa (yellow card) 71'; Novoseltsev (yellow card) 85'; Burmistrov (red card) 90+'; Tsallagov (yellow card) 90+'	Stadium: Rostov Arena; Attendance: 12,580; Referee: Vasily Kazartsev

12 March 2021 22	Khimki	1–0	Rostov	Khimki
19:00 MSK (UTC+3)	Kamyshev (yellow card) 32'; Mirzov 49' (pen.); Troshechkin (yellow card) 77' (yellow-red card) 89'	Report	Almqvist (yellow card) 67'	Stadium: Arena Khimki; Attendance: 1,092; Referee: Sergey Lapochkin

17 March 2021 23	Rotor Volgograd	0–4	Rostov	Volgograd
18:00 MSK (UTC+3)	Zhigulyov (yellow card) 48'; Gogoua (yellow card) 86'	Report	Sowe (penalty missed) 8' 62'; Gigović 41'; Glebov (yellow card) 49'; Almqvist 59'; Kozlov (yellow card) 64'; Saplinov 90+'	Stadium: Volgograd Arena; Attendance: 5,085; Referee: Kirill Levnikov

4 April 2021 24	Rostov	2–3	Spartak Moscow	Rostov-on-Don
19:00 MSK (UTC+3)	Maslov 27' (o.g.); Makhatadze 32'; Sowe (yellow card) 52'	Report	Promes (yellow card) 15'; Moses 23'; Sobolev 44', 58'; Zobnin (yellow card) 62'; Hendrix (yellow card) 90'	Stadium: Rostov Arena; Attendance: 32,888; Referee: Pavel Kukuyan

10 April 2021 25	Rostov	0–1	Rubin Kazan	Rostov-on-Don
19:00 MSK (UTC+3)	Poyarkov (yellow card) 52'; Gigović (yellow card) 60'	Report	Despotović (yellow card) 31'; Zuyev (yellow card) 45+'; Jevtić 73'; Dyupin (yellow card) 90+'	Stadium: Rostov Arena; Attendance: 15,011; Referee: Stanislav Vasiliev

17 April 2021 26	Lokomotiv Moscow	4–1	Rostov	Moscow
16:30 MSK (UTC+3)	Kamano 4'; Zhemaletdinov 6'; Magkeyev (yellow card) 12'; Krychowiak 65' (pen.); Eder 90'	Report	Hashimoto (yellow card) 8'; Gigović (yellow card) 17' (yellow-red card) 52'; Hadžikadunić 33'	Stadium: RZD Arena; Attendance: 10,317; Referee: Mikhail Vilkov

25 April 2021 27	Rostov	1–0	Arsenal Tula	Rostov-on-Don
16:30 MSK (UTC+3)	Poloz (yellow card) 41' (goal) 74' (pen.); Obukhov (yellow card) 89'	Report	Grigalava (yellow card) 39'; Burlak (red card) 50'; Khlusevich (yellow card) 66'; Panchenko (yellow card) 83'; Bauer (penalty missed) 89'	Stadium: Rostov Arena; Attendance: 15,021; Referee: Vladislav Bezborodov

2 May 2021 28	Rostov	2–0	Tambov	Rostov-on-Don
16:30 MSK (UTC+3)	Gigović (yellow card) 41'; Hashimoto (yellow card) 54' (goal) 78'; Poloz 70'	Report	Karapuzov (yellow card) 11'; Carp (yellow card) 53'	Stadium: Rostov Arena; Attendance: 13,251; Referee: Igor Panin

10 May 2021 29	Ural Yekaterinburg	1–0	Rostov	Yekaterinburg
16:30 MSK (UTC+3)	Gadzhimuradov 37'; Pogrebnyak (yellow card) 69'	Report	Hadžikadunić (yellow card) 40'; Aleesami (yellow card) 84'; Hashimoto (yellow card) 90+'	Stadium: Central Stadium; Attendance: 12,948; Referee: Pavel Shadykhanov

16 May 2021 30	Rostov	1–3	Krasnodar	Rostov-on-Don
14:00 MSK (UTC+3)	Folmer (yellow card) 5'; Hashimoto (yellow card) 35'; Gazinsky 49' (o.g.)	Report	Chernov (yellow card) 13'; Olsson 45+'; Wanderson 59'; Kaio 90+'	Stadium: Rostov Arena; Attendance: 25,123; Referee: Aleksei Matyunin

=== Russian Cup ===
21 February 2021 Round of 16	Rostov	0–1	Akhmat Grozny	Rostov-on-Don
19:30 MSK (UTC+3)	Hadžikadunić (yellow card) 23'; Glebov (yellow card) 74'; Normann (penalty missed) 82'; Makhatadze (yellow card) 85'	Report	Nenakhov (yellow card) 5' (yellow-red card) 47'; Berisha (yellow card) 6' (goal) 19' (pen.); Shvets (yellow card) 13'; Timofeyev (yellow card) 40'	Stadium: Rostov Arena; Attendance: 10,054; Referee: Igor Panin

=== UEFA Europa League ===
==== Qualifying rounds ====
24 September 2020 Third qualifying round	Rostov (Russia)	1–2	(Israel) Maccabi Haifa	Rostov-on-Don, Russia
19:00 MSK (UTC+3)	Shomurodov 9'; Glebov (red card) 69'	Report	Rukavytsya 20'; Planić (yellow card) 45'; Abu Fani 60'; Arad (yellow card) 87'	Stadium: Rostov Arena; Attendance: 0 Referee: Petr Ardeleánu (Czech Republic)

== Squad statistics ==
As of match played 16 May 2021

=== Appearances and goals ===
No.	Pos	Nat	Player	Total		Premier League		Russian Cup		UEFA Europa League	
No.	Pos	Nat	Player	Apps	Goals	Apps	Goals	Apps	Goals	Apps	Goals
2	DF	(Norway) NOR	Haitam Aleesami	14	0	8+5	0	0+1	0	0	0
4	DF	(Russia) RUS	Denis Terentyev	15	0	12+3	0	0	0	0	0
5	DF	(Bosnia and Herzegovina) BIH	Dennis Hadžikadunić	27	1	25	1	1	0	1	0
6	MF	(Japan) JPN	Kento Hashimoto	20	6	14+5	6	0	0	0+1	0
8	MF	(Sweden) SWE	Armin Gigović	17	1	9+8	1	0	0	0	0
10	MF	(Russia) RUS	Pavel Mamayev	13	2	7+6	2	0	0	0	0
11	MF	(Sweden) SWE	Pontus Almqvist	20	1	11+8	1	1	0	0	0
13	FW	(Russia) RUS	Vladimir Obukhov	11	0	2+8	0	0+1	0	0	0
15	MF	(Russia) RUS	Danil Glebov	28	1	21+5	1	1	0	1	0
17	MF	(Norway) NOR	Mathias Normann	17	1	15	1	1	0	1	0
19	MF	(Armenia) ARM	Khoren Bayramyan	25	3	14+9	3	0+1	0	1	0
20	FW	(The Gambia) GAM	Ali Sowe	12	3	11	3	1	0	0	0
21	MF	(Russia) RUS	Georgi Makhatadze	11	1	8+2	1	0+1	0	0	0
22	DF	(Belarus) BLR	Aleksandr Pavlovets	5	0	2+3	0	0	0	0	0
23	MF	(Russia) RUS	Roman Tugarev	17	1	7+9	1	0+1	0	0	0
24	MF	(Russia) RUS	Konstantin Kovalyov	1	0	0+1	0	0	0	0	0
25	MF	(Russia) RUS	Kirill Folmer	6	0	1+5	0	0	0	0	0
26	MF	(Russia) RUS	Aleksandr Saplinov	3	1	0+3	1	0	0	0	0
30	GK	(Russia) RUS	Sergei Pesyakov	26	0	24	0	1	0	1	0
34	DF	(Russia) RUS	Aleksei Kozlov	26	1	20+4	1	1	0	1	0
55	DF	(Russia) RUS	Maksim Osipenko	30	0	28	0	1	0	1	0
71	DF	(Russia) RUS	Nikolai Poyarkov	18	0	12+5	0	1	0	0	0
76	FW	(Russia) RUS	Danila Sukhomlinov	3	0	0+3	0	0	0	0	0
77	GK	(Russia) RUS	Maksim Rudakov	1	0	1	0	0	0	0	0
90	FW	(Russia) RUS	Maksim Turishchev	1	0	0+1	0	0	0	0	0
96	DF	(Russia) RUS	Aleksandr Gapechkin	1	0	0+1	0	0	0	0	0
99	FW	(Russia) RUS	Dmitry Poloz	28	6	18+8	6	1	0	0+1	0
Players away from the club on loan:
1	GK	(Russia) RUS	Yegor Baburin	4	0	4	0	0	0	0	0
9	FW	(North Macedonia) MKD	David Toshevski	7	0	0+6	0	0	0	0+1	0
12	MF	(Russia) RUS	Aleksandr Smirnov	1	0	0+1	0	0	0	0	0
25	DF	(Russia) RUS	Arseny Logashov	4	0	0+4	0	0	0	0	0
47	FW	(Russia) RUS	Aleksandr Dolgov	5	0	0+5	0	0	0	0	0
78	DF	(Russia) RUS	Dmitri Chistyakov	2	0	1+1	0	0	0	0	0
83	FW	(Russia) RUS	Artur Sokhiyev	3	0	0+3	0	0	0	0	0
Players who appeared for Rostov but left during the season:
7	MF	(Finland) FIN	Roman Eremenko	18	1	13+3	1	1	0	1	0
8	MF	(Bulgaria) BUL	Ivelin Popov	2	0	2	0	0	0	0	0
11	MF	(Russia) RUS	Aleksei Ionov	10	1	9	1	0	0	1	0
14	FW	(Uzbekistan) UZB	Eldor Shomurodov	9	1	8	0	0	0	1	1
18	MF	(Kazakhstan) KAZ	Baktiyar Zaynutdinov	4	0	4	0	0	0	0	0
28	DF	(Russia) RUS	Yevgeni Chernov	10	1	8+1	1	0	0	1	0

=== Goal scorers ===
Place	Position	Nation	Number	Name	Premier League	Russian Cup	UEFA Europa League	Total
1	MF	(Japan)	6	Kento Hashimoto	6	0	0	6
1	FW	(Russia)	99	Dmitry Poloz	6	0	0	6
3	MF	(Armenia)	19	Khoren Bayramyan	3	0	0	3
3	FW	(The Gambia)	20	Ali Sowe	3	0	0	3
5	MF	(Russia)	10	Pavel Mamayev	2	0	0	2
5				Own goal	2	0	0	2
7	MF	(Norway)	17	Mathias Normann	1	0	0	1
7	DF	(Russia)	28	Yevgeni Chernov	1	0	0	1
7	MF	(Russia)	11	Aleksei Ionov	1	0	0	1
7	MF	(Finland)	7	Roman Eremenko	1	0	0	1
7	MF	(Russia)	15	Danil Glebov	1	0	0	1
7	MF	(Russia)	23	Roman Tugarev	1	0	0	1
7	DF	(Russia)	34	Aleksei Kozlov	1	0	0	1
7	MF	(Sweden)	8	Armin Gigović	1	0	0	1
7	MF	(Sweden)	11	Pontus Almqvist	1	0	0	1
7	MF	(Russia)	26	Aleksandr Saplinov	1	0	0	1
7	MF	(Russia)	21	Georgi Makhatadze	1	0	0	1
7	DF	(Bosnia and Herzegovina)	5	Dennis Hadžikadunić	1	0	0	1
7	FW	(Uzbekistan)	14	Eldor Shomurodov	0	0	1	1
				Awarded	3	0	0	3
Total					37	0	1	38

=== Clean sheets ===
Place	Position	Nation	Number	Name	Premier League	Russian Cup	UEFA Europa League	Total
1	GK	(Russia)	30	Sergei Pesyakov	11	0	0	11
2	GK	(Russia)	1	Yegor Baburin	1	0	0	1
Total					12	0	0	12

=== Disciplinary record ===
Number	Nation	Position	Name	Premier League		Russian Cup		UEFA Europa League		Total	
Number	Nation	Position	Name	Booked	Sent off (straight red)	Booked	Sent off (straight red)	Booked	Sent off (straight red)	Booked	Sent off (straight red)
2	(Norway)	DF	Haitam Aleesami	3	0	0	0	0	0	3	0
4	(Russia)	DF	Denis Terentyev	2	0	0	0	0	0	2	0
5	(Bosnia and Herzegovina)	DF	Dennis Hadžikadunić	8	1	1	0	0	0	9	1
6	(Japan)	MF	Kento Hashimoto	7	0	0	0	0	0	7	0
8	(Sweden)	MF	Armin Gigović	6	1	0	0	0	0	6	1
11	(Sweden)	MF	Pontus Almqvist	2	0	0	0	0	0	2	0
13	(Russia)	FW	Vladimir Obukhov	2	0	0	0	0	0	2	0
15	(Russia)	MF	Danil Glebov	5	1	1	0	0	1	6	2
17	(Norway)	MF	Mathias Normann	8	1	0	0	0	0	8	1
19	(Armenia)	MF	Khoren Bayramyan	4	0	0	0	0	0	4	0
20	(The Gambia)	FW	Ali Sowe	2	0	0	0	0	0	2	0
21	(Russia)	MF	Georgi Makhatadze	0	0	1	0	0	0	1	0
25	(Russia)	MF	Kirill Folmer	1	0	0	0	0	0	1	0
34	(Russia)	DF	Aleksei Kozlov	3	0	0	0	0	0	3	0
55	(Russia)	DF	Maksim Osipenko	1	1	0	0	0	0	1	1
71	(Russia)	DF	Nikolai Poyarkov	3	0	0	0	0	0	3	0
76	(Russia)	FW	Danila Sukhomlinov	1	0	0	0	0	0	1	0
99	(Russia)	FW	Dmitry Poloz	3	0	0	0	0	0	3	0
Players away on loan:
9	(North Macedonia)	FW	David Toshevski	1	0	0	0	0	0	1	0
47	(Russia)	FW	Aleksandr Dolgov	1	0	0	0	0	0	1	0
Players who left Rostov during the season:
7	(Finland)	MF	Roman Eremenko	3	1	0	0	0	0	3	1
8	(Bulgaria)	MF	Ivelin Popov	1	0	0	0	0	0	1	0
11	(Russia)	MF	Aleksei Ionov	2	0	0	0	0	0	2	0
14	(Uzbekistan)	FW	Eldor Shomurodov	1	0	0	0	0	0	1	0
18	(Kazakhstan)	MF	Baktiyar Zaynutdinov	2	0	0	0	0	0	2	0
28	(Russia)	DF	Yevgeni Chernov	3	0	0	0	0	0	3	0
Total				75	6	3	0	0	1	78	7
