= Ruslan Maltsev =

Russian footballer

Personal information
- Full name: Ruslan Magomedovich Maltsev
- Date of birth: 24 February 2003 (age 23)
- Height: 1.79 m (5 ft 10 in)
- Position: Midfielder

Team information
- Current team: Rodina-2 Moscow
- Number: 89

Youth career
- –2019: Chertanovo
- 2019–2021: Dynamo Moscow

Senior career*
Years	Team	Apps	(Gls)
2021–2022	Veles Moscow	14	(0)
2023	Saturn Ramenskoye	12	(0)
2023–2024	Dynamo Kirov	28	(2)
2024–	Rodina-2 Moscow	62	(1)
2024–2025	Rodina Moscow	12	(0)
- * Club domestic league appearances and goals as of 15 November 2026

Ruslan Magomedovich Maltsev (Russian: Руслан Магомедович Мальцев; born 24 February 2003) is a Russian football player who plays for Rodina-2 Moscow.

== Club career ==
He made his debut in the Russian Football National League for FC Veles Moscow on 15 September 2021 in a game against FC Olimp-Dolgoprudny.
