= Kento Hashimoto =

Japanese footballer

Kento Hashimoto 橋本 拳人
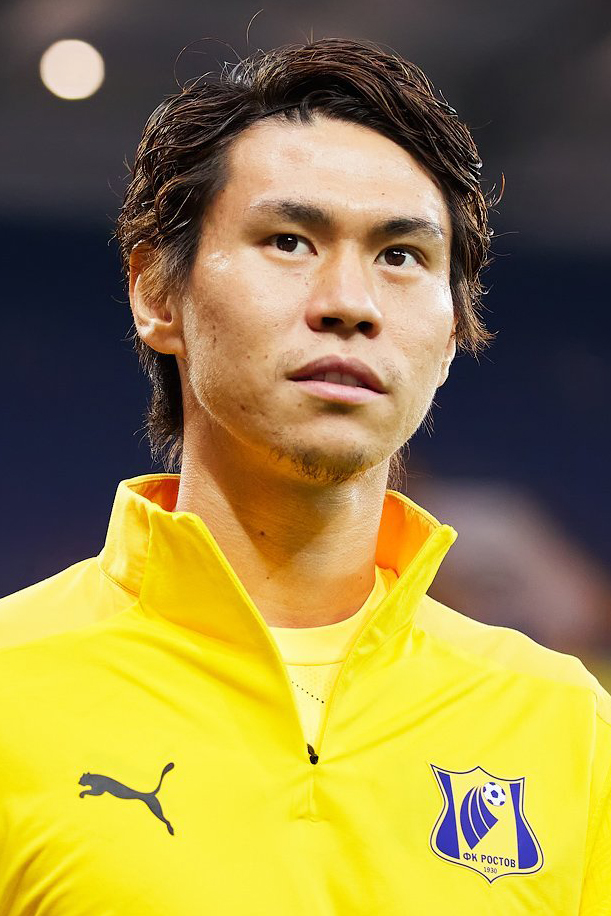
- Hashimoto with FC Rostov in 2020

Personal information
- Date of birth: 16 August 1993 (age 33)
- Place of birth: Itabashi, Tokyo, Japan
- Height: 1.83 m (6 ft 0 in)
- Position: Defensive midfielder

Team information
- Current team: FC Tokyo
- Number: 18

Youth career
- –2005: Amigo SC
- 2006–2011: FC Tokyo

Senior career*
| Years | Team | Apps | (Gls) |
| 2012–2020 | FC Tokyo | 132 | (14) |
| 2013–2014 | → Roasso Kumamoto (loan) | 60 | (0) |
| 2014–2015 | → J.League U22 (loan) | 2 | (0) |
| 2016–2017 | → FC Tokyo U-23 | 3 | (1) |
| 2020–2023 | Rostov | 29 | (8) |
| 2022 | → Vissel Kobe (loan) | 9 | (1) |
| 2022–2023 | → Huesca (loan) | 33 | (0) |
| 2023–2024 | Huesca | 31 | (2) |
| 2024–2025 | Eibar | 7 | (0) |
| 2025– | FC Tokyo | 25 | (0) |

International career^{‡}
| 2012 | Japan U19 | 1 | (0) |
| 2016 | Japan U23 | 1 | (0) |
| 2019– | Japan | 15 | (1) |
Medal record
Men's football
Representing Japan
EAFF Championship
| Winner | 2022 Japan | Team |
- * Club domestic league appearances and goals as of 16 September 2025 ‡ National team caps and goals as of 27 July 2022

Kento Hashimoto (橋本 拳人, Hashimoto Kento; born August 16, 1993) is a Japanese football player who plays as a defensive midfielder for J1 League club FC Tokyo and the Japan national team.

== Club career ==
=== FC Tokyo ===
Considered one of the best prospects in FC Tokyo's youth ranks, he first joined the first-team squad from the 2011 J.League Division 2 season. He didn't manage to amass much playing time in the squad, so Hashimoto was loaned to Roasso Kumamoto for the 2013 and 2014 seasons.

=== Rostov ===
On 9 July 2020, Russian Premier League club FC Rostov announced that they had reached an agreement with FC Tokyo for Hashimoto's transfer, and he would move pending a medical. The Japanese footballer signed a 4-year contract with Rostov after arriving in Russia and completing the medical exam. On 23 August 2020, he scored his first goal for Rostov to secure a 1–0 away victory over FC Ufa. In their next game 3 days later he once again scored the only goal of the game to beat FC Ural Yekaterinburg 1–0.

On 19 February 2021, Rostov removed Hashimoto from their official squad as registered with the league. That was expected to be temporary, as Russian clubs are only allowed to have 8 foreign players registered at the same time, and Hashimoto was injured at the time. He was returned to the squad list on 24 February after the loan of David Toshevski freed up a foreign player spot.

==== Loan to Vissel Kobe ====
On 27 March 2022, Hashimoto returned to Japan and signed for Vissel Kobe firstly on a three-month transfer from Russia's FC Rostov after a FIFA ruling temporarily freezing the contracts of foreign players signed with Russian clubs and allowing them to go elsewhere. On 1 July 2022, his contract was officially extended for an undisclosed period.

=== Huesca ===
On 18 July 2022, Hashimoto signed with Huesca in Spain. On 3 September 2023, Hashimoto returned to Huesca on a permanent basis and signed a two-year contract.

=== Eibar ===
On 29 August 2024, Hashimoto signed a one-year deal with Eibar also in the Spanish Segunda División.

=== Return to FC Tokyo ===
On 9 January 2025, Eibar announce official transfer of Hashimoto to J1 club FC Tokyo for 2025 season.

== International career ==
Hashimoto made his debut for the Japan national football team on 26 March 2019 in a friendly against Bolivia, as a starter.

== Career statistics ==
=== Club ===
As of the start from 2025 season.

| Club performance | | | League | | Cup | | League Cup | | Continental | | Total | |
| Club | Season | League | Apps | Goals | Apps | Goals | Apps | Goals | Apps | Goals | Apps | Goals |
| Japan | | | League | | Emperor's Cup | | J.League Cup | | AFC | | Total | |
|---|---|---|---|---|---|---|---|---|---|---|---|---|
| Roasso Kumamoto | 2013 | J.League Div 2 | 21 | 0 | 1 | 0 | – | | – | | 22 | 0 |
| Roasso Kumamoto | 2014 | J.League Div 2 | 39 | 0 | 1 | 0 | – | | – | | 40 | 0 |
| Roasso Kumamoto | Total | | 60 | 0 | 2 | 0 | – | | – | | 62 | 0 |
| FC Tokyo | 2015 | J1 League | 13 | 1 | 2 | 1 | 4 | 0 | – | | 19 | 2 |
| FC Tokyo | 2016 | J1 League | 28 | 4 | 1 | 0 | 4 | 0 | 6 | 0 | 39 | 4 |
| FC Tokyo | 2017 | J1 League | 26 | 5 | 0 | 0 | 6 | 1 | – | | 32 | 6 |
| FC Tokyo | 2018 | J1 League | 27 | 1 | 2 | 1 | 3 | 0 | – | | 32 | 2 |
| FC Tokyo | 2019 | J1 League | 34 | 3 | 2 | 1 | 2 | 0 | – | | 38 | 4 |
| FC Tokyo | 2020 | J1 League | 4 | 0 | – | | – | | 2 | 0 | 6 | 0 |
| FC Tokyo | Total | | 132 | 14 | 7 | 3 | 19 | 1 | 8 | 0 | 166 | 18 |
| Russia | | | League | | Russian Cup | | | | Europe | | Total | |
| FC Rostov | 2020–21 | RPL | 19 | 6 | – | | – | | 1 | 0 | 20 | 6 |
| FC Rostov | 2021–22 | RPL | 10 | 2 | – | | – | | – | | 10 | 2 |
| FC Rostov | Total | | 29 | 8 | – | | – | | 1 | 0 | 30 | 8 |
| Japan | | | League | | Emperor's Cup | | J.League Cup | | AFC | | Total | |
| Vissel Kobe | 2022 | J1 League | 8 | 1 | 1 | 0 | – | | 0 | 0 | 9 | 1 |
| Spain | | | League | | Copa del Rey | | | | Europe | | Total | |
| SD Huesca | 2022–23 | Segunda División | 33 | 0 | 0 | 0 | – | | – | | 33 | 0 |
| SD Huesca | 2023–24 | Segunda División | 31 | 2 | 2 | 0 | – | | – | | 33 | 2 |
| SD Eibar | 2024–25 | Segunda División | 7 | 0 | 1 | 0 | – | | – | | 8 | 0 |
| Japan | | | League | | Emperor's Cup | | J.League Cup | | AFC | | Total | |
| FC Tokyo | 2025 | J1 League | 0 | 0 | 0 | 0 | – | | 0 | 0 | 0 | 0 |
| Career Total | | | 301 | 25 | 13 | 2 | 19 | 1 | 9 | 0 | 341 | 28 |

=== Reserves performance ===
Last Updated: 25 February 2019

| Club performance | | | League | | Total | |
| Season | Club | League | Apps | Goals | Apps | Goals |
| Japan | | | League | | Total | |
|---|---|---|---|---|---|---|
| 2015 | J.League U-22 Selection | J3 | 2 | 0 | 2 | 0 |
| 2017 | FC Tokyo U-23 | J3 | 1 | 0 | 1 | 0 |
| 2018 | FC Tokyo U-23 | J3 | 2 | 1 | 2 | 1 |
| Career total | | | 5 | 1 | 5 | 1 |

=== International goals ===
| No. | Date | Venue | Opponent | Score | Result | Competition |
|---|---|---|---|---|---|---|
| 1 | 7 June 2021 | Panasonic Stadium Suita, Suita, Japan | Tajikistan | 3–1 | 4–1 | 2022 FIFA World Cup qualification |

== Honours ==
=== International ===
- EAFF Championship: 2022

=== Individual ===
- J.League Best XI: 2019
