= Aleksandr Smirnov (footballer, born 1996) =

Russian footballer

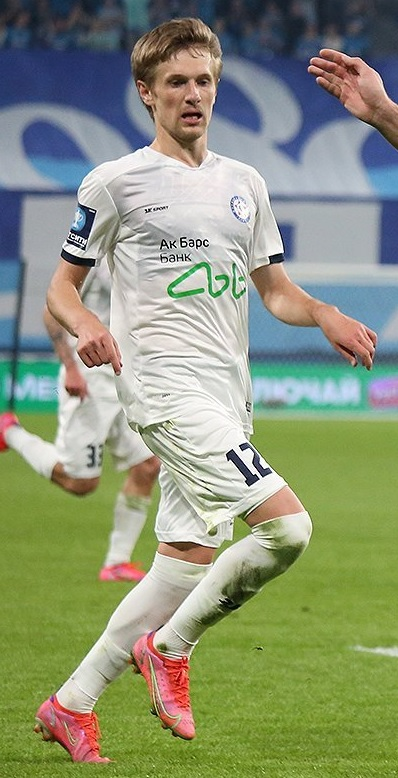
- Smirnov with KAMAZ in 2022

Personal information
- Full name: Aleksandr Petrovich Smirnov
- Date of birth: 12 April 1996 (age 30)
- Place of birth: Kirs, Russia
- Height: 1.77 m (5 ft 10 in)
- Position: Left-back

Youth career
- –2012: RSDYuSSh Syktyvkar
- 2012–2015: Lokomotiv Moscow

Senior career*
Years	Team	Apps	(Gls)
2016–2017	Dolgoprudny	25	(2)
2017–2018	Novigrad	18	(2)
2018–2020	Khimki	40	(3)
2019–2020	→ Khimki-M	6	(0)
2020–2022	Rostov	1	(0)
2020–2021	→ Orenburg (loan)	15	(0)
2021	→ SKA-Khabarovsk (loan)	18	(1)
2022	→ KAMAZ (loan)	12	(0)
2023–2026	Kuban Krasnodar	84	(1)
2026	Irtysh Omsk	9	(0)
- * Club domestic league appearances and goals as of 13 June 2026

Aleksandr Petrovich Smirnov (Russian: Александр Петрович Смирнов; born 12 April 1996) is a Russian football player.

== Club career ==
He made his debut in the Russian Professional Football League for Dolgoprudny on 10 April 2016 in a game against Znamya Truda Orekhovo-Zuyevo.

He made his Russian Football National League debut for Khimki on 29 July 2018 in a game against Sochi.

On 4 August 2020, he signed with Russian Premier League club Rostov. He made his Russian Premier League debut for Rostov on 26 August 2020 in a game against Ural Yekaterinburg. On 28 September 2020, he joined Orenburg on loan.

On 16 June 2021, he moved to SKA-Khabarovsk on loan for the 2021–22 season. In January 2022, he moved to KAMAZ Naberezhnye Chelny on loan until the end of the 2021–22 season.

On 21 January 2023, Smirnov signed with Russian First League club Kuban Krasnodar.

== Career statistics ==
As of match played 12 November 2023

Club	Season	League			Cup		Continental		Other		Total	
Club	Season	Division	Apps	Goals	Apps	Goals	Apps	Goals	Apps	Goals	Apps	Goals
FSK Dolgoprudny	2016–17	Russian Second League	25	2	3	0	–		–		28	2
NK Novigrad	2017–18	2. HNL	18	2	2	0	–		–		20	2
Khimki	2018–19	Russian First League	29	1	2	0	–		–		31	1
Khimki	2019–20	Russian First League	11	2	4	0	–		–		15	2
Khimki	Total		40	3	6	0	0	0	0	0	94	6
FC Khimki-M	2019–20	Russian Second League	6	0	–		–		–		6	0
Rostov	2020–21	Russian Premier League	1	0	–		–		–		1	0
Orenburg (loan)	2020–21	Russian First League	15	0	–		–		–		15	0
SKA-Khabarovsk (loan)	2021–22	Russian First League	16	1	1	0	–		–		17	1
FC KAMAZ (loan)	2021–22	Russian First League	12	0	0	0	–		–		12	0
Kuban Krasnodar	2022–23	Russian First League	10	0	–		–		–		10	0
Kuban Krasnodar	2023–24	Russian First League	14	0	1	0	–		–		15	0
Kuban Krasnodar	Total		24	0	1	0	–		–		25	0
Career total			157	8	12	0	0	0	0	0	170	8
