= Ilya Dyatlov =

Russian footballer (born 2004)

Personal information
- Full name: Ilya Nikolayevich Dyatlov
- Date of birth: 12 January 2004 (age 22)
- Place of birth: Moscow, Russia
- Height: 1.81 m (5 ft 11 in)
- Position: Left back

Team information
- Current team: Rodina Moscow
- Number: 49

Youth career
- –2016: Rosich Moskovsky
- 2016–2022: Dynamo Moscow
- 2022–2023: Khimki

Senior career*
Years	Team	Apps	(Gls)
2023–2025	Khimki-M	23	(1)
2024–2025	→ Volga Ulyanovsk (loan)	29	(1)
2025–	Rodina Moscow	31	(2)
2025–	→ Rodina-2 Moscow	6	(1)
- * Club domestic league appearances and goals as of 15 November 2026

Ilya Nikolayevich Dyatlov (Russian: Илья Николаевич Дятлов; born 12 January 2004) is a Russian football player who plays as a left back for Rodina Moscow and Rodina-2 Moscow.

== Career ==
Dyatlov is a product of Dynamo Moscow academy and started his senior career in the fourth-tier Russian Second League Division B. He was loaned to Volga Ulyanovsk for the 2024–25 season, where he achieved promotion to the Russian First League.

In the summer of 2026, he joined Rodina Moscow in the Russian First League. He established himself as a starter there and contributed to the club's first ever promotion to the Russian Premier League.

Dyatlov made his debut in the Russian Premier League for Rodina on 25 July 2026 in a game against Spartak Moscow.

== Career statistics ==
As of 15 November 2026

Club	Season	League			Cup		Total	
Club	Season	Division	Apps	Goals	Apps	Goals	Apps	Goals
Khimki-M	2023	Russian Second League B	11	1	—		11	1
Khimki-M	2024	Russian Second League B	12	0	—		12	0
Khimki-M	Total		23	1	0	0	23	1
Volga Ulyanovsk (loan)	2024–25	Russian Second League A	29	1	0	0	29	1
Rodina Moscow	2025–26	Russian First League	26	2	0	0	26	2
Rodina Moscow	2026–27	Russian Premier League	5	0	3	0	8	0
Rodina Moscow	Total		31	2	3	0	34	2
Rodina-2 Moscow	2025–26	Russian Second League A	1	0	—		1	0
Rodina-2 Moscow	2026–27	Russian Second League A	5	1	—		5	1
Rodina-2 Moscow	Total		6	1	0	0	6	1
Career total			89	5	3	0	92	5
