= Nikolai Poyarkov =

Russian footballer (born 1999)

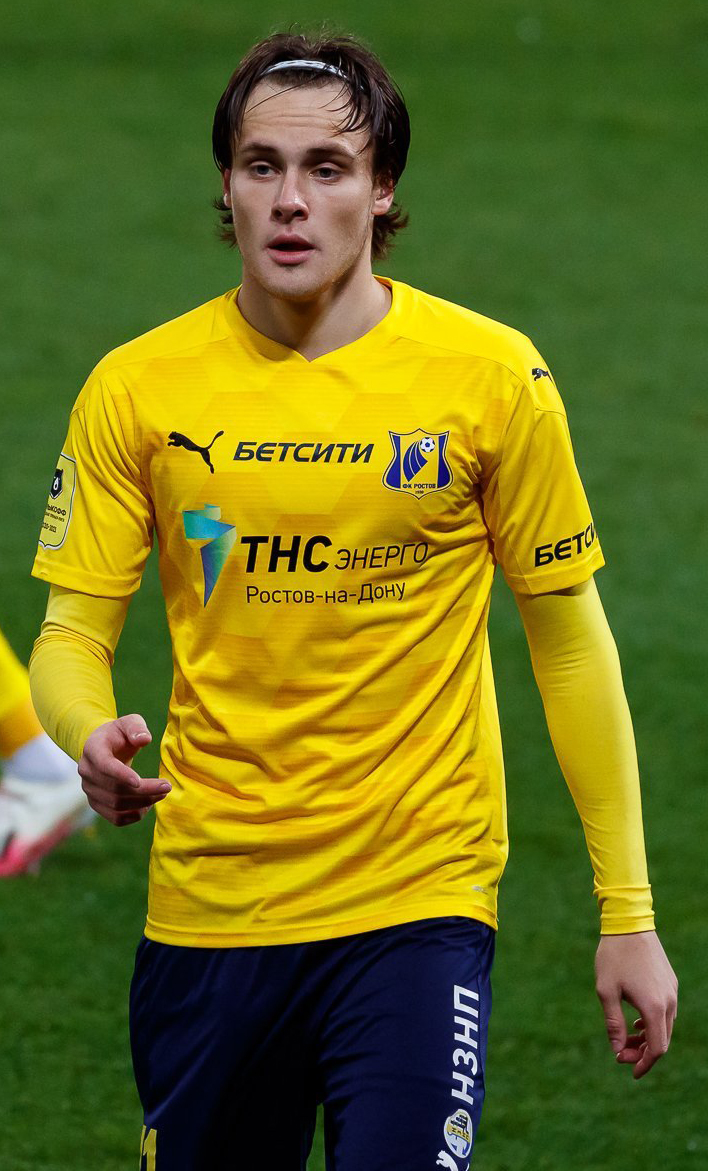
- Poyarkov with Rostov in 2020

Personal information
- Full name: Nikolai Vladimirovich Poyarkov
- Date of birth: 16 October 1999 (age 27)
- Place of birth: Yefremov, Russia
- Height: 1.80 m (5 ft 11 in)
- Position: Left-back

Team information
- Current team: Rotor Volgograd
- Number: 16

Youth career
- –2019: Lokomotiv Moscow

Senior career*
Years	Team	Apps	(Gls)
2017–2019	Kazanka Moscow	18	(1)
2019–2026	Rostov	35	(0)
2019–2020	→ Rubin Kazan (loan)	7	(0)
2023–2024	→ Fakel Voronezh (loan)	0	(0)
2024–2025	→ SKA-Khabarovsk (loan)	15	(1)
2026	Sokol Saratov	10	(0)
2026–	Rotor Volgograd	0	(0)

International career^{‡}
2016–2017	Russia U-18	11	(0)
- * Club domestic league appearances and goals as of 16 May 2026 ‡ National team caps and goals as of 28 March 2017

Nikolai Vladimirovich Poyarkov (Russian: Никола́й Влади́мирович Поя́рков; born 16 October 1999) is a Russian football player who plays as a left-back for Rotor Volgograd.

== Club career ==
He made his debut in the Russian Professional Football League for Lokomotiv-Kazanka Moscow on 19 July 2017 in a game against Znamya Truda Orekhovo-Zuyevo.

On 2 September 2019, he signed with Rostov and was immediately loaned to Rubin Kazan.

He made his Russian Premier League debut for Rubin on 25 October 2019 in a game against Ural Yekaterinburg. He started the game and played the whole match.

On 14 September 2023, Poyarkov was loaned by Fakel Voronezh. On 25 July 2024, he moved on a new loan to SKA-Khabarovsk.

On 18 January 2026, Poyarkov signed with Sokol Saratov.

== International ==
Poyarkov played for the Russia national under-18 football team.

== Career statistics ==
As of match played 12 April 2025

Appearances and goals by club, season and competition
Club	Season	League			Cup		Continental		Other		Total	
Club	Season	Division	Apps	Goals	Apps	Goals	Apps	Goals	Apps	Goals	Apps	Goals
Kazanka Moscow	2017–18	Russian Second League	5	0	–		–		4 (Note: Appearances in the FNL Cup)	1	9	1
Kazanka Moscow	2018–19	Russian Second League	8	1	–		–		–		8	1
Kazanka Moscow	2019–20	Russian Second League	5	0	–		–		–		5	0
Kazanka Moscow	Total		18	1	0	0	0	0	4	1	22	2
Rostov	2020–21	Russian Premier League	17	0	1	0	0	0	–		18	0
Rostov	2021–22	Russian Premier League	14	0	0	0	–		–		14	0
Rostov	2022–23	Russian Premier League	0	0	2	0	–		–		2	0
Rostov	2023–24	Russian Premier League	2	0	1	0	–		–		3	0
Rostov	2024–25	Russian Premier League	2	0	1	0	–		–		3	0
Rostov	Total		35	0	5	0	0	0	0	0	40	0
Rubin Kazan (loan)	2019–20	Russian Premier League	7	0	0	0	–		–		7	0
Fakel Voronezh (loan)	2023–24	Russian Premier League	0	0	1	0	–		–		1	0
SKA-Khabarovsk (loan)	2024–25	Russian First League	15	1	1	0	–		–		16	1
Career total			75	2	7	0	0	0	4	1	86	3
