= Kerfala Cissoko =

Guinean footballer (born 1999)

Personal information
- Date of birth: 16 August 1999 (age 27)
- Place of birth: Guinea
- Height: 1.86 m (6 ft 1 in)
- Position: Left winger

Team information
- Current team: Rodina Moscow
- Number: 95

Senior career*
Years	Team	Apps	(Gls)
2018	AFC Eskilstuna	4	(0)
2019–2020	Dalkurd	37	(14)
2020–2021	Hapoel Kfar Saba	4	(0)
2021–2022	Örebro Syrianska IF	27	(10)
2022	Dalkurd	9	(0)
2023–2024	Umeå FC	58	(33)
2025	Jaro	25	(14)
2026–	Rodina Moscow	10	(1)

International career^{‡}
- Guinea U17
2026–	Guinea	1	(0)
- * Club domestic league appearances and goals as of 11 October 2026 ‡ National team caps and goals as of 16 November 2026

Kerfala Cissoko (born 16 August 1999) is a Guinean professional footballer who plays as a forward for Russian Premier League club Rodina Moscow and the Guinea national team.

== Club career ==
After starting his senior career in Sweden in 2018 and playing in Superettan and in Israel in Israeli Premier League with Hapoel Kfar Saba, Cissoko spent time with Finnish Veikkausliiga club Ilves on trial in April 2021, but was not offered a contract. He returned to Sweden and spent four years in the country. He won the Ettan Golden Boot in 2024 with Umeå FC by scoring 19 goals during the season, when his team won the promotion to Superettan.

After his Swedish work permit extension was rejected, Cissoko moved to Finland and signed with newly promoted Veikkausliiga club Jaro in March 2025 for the 2025 season. He scored a brace in a season opening match against IFK Mariehamn, helping his side to get 2–0 away win.

== International career ==
Cissoko made his debut for the Guinea national team on 12 November 2026 in an AFCON qualifier against Eritrea.

== Career statistics ==
As of 11 October 2026

Appearances and goals by club, season and competition
Club	Season	League			National cup (Note: Includes Svenska Cupen and Suomen Cup)		Other		Total	
Club	Season	Division	Apps	Goals	Apps	Goals	Apps	Goals	Apps	Goals
AFC Eskilstuna	2018	Superettan	4	0	1	0	2 (Note: Appearances in promotion play-offs)	0	7	0
Dalkurd	2019	Superettan	24	9	4	2	—		28	11
Dalkurd	2020	Superettan	13	5	0	0	—		13	5
Dalkurd	Total		37	14	4	2	0	0	41	16
Hapoel Kfar Saba	2020–21	Israeli Premier League	4	0	0	0	—		4	0
Örebro Syrianska IF	2021	Ettan	14	4	0	0	—		14	4
Örebro Syrianska IF	2022	Ettan	13	6	1	0	—		14	6
Örebro Syrianska IF	Total		27	10	1	0	0	0	28	10
Dalkurd	2022	Superettan	9	0	1	0	—		10	0
Umeå FC	2023	Ettan	29	14	0	0	—		29	14
Umeå FC	2024	Ettan	29	19	0	0	—		29	19
Umeå FC	Total		58	33	0	0	0	0	58	33
Jaro	2025	Veikkausliiga	25	14	6	2	—		31	16
Rodina Moscow	2025–26	Russian First League	8	1	—		—		8	1
Rodina Moscow	2026–27	Russian Premier League	2	0	1	0	—		3	0
Rodina Moscow	Total		10	1	1	0	0	0	11	1
Career total			174	72	14	4	2	0	190	76

== Honours ==
Umeå

- Ettan Norra: 2024

Individual

- Ettan Norra top goalscorer: 2024
