= FC Rodina-3 Moscow =

Russian football team based in Moscow

- Full name: Football Club Rodina-3 Moscow
- Founded: 2022
- Ground: Rodina Stadium, Khimki
- Capacity: 3,760
- Manager: Aleksandr Dimidko
- League: Russian Second League, Division B, Group 3
- 2026: 7th
- Website: fcrodina.com/m/

FC Rodina-3 Moscow (Russian: ФК «Родина-3») is a Russian football team based in Moscow. It was founded in 2022. It is a farm club for FC Rodina Moscow.

== Club history ==
Moscow-based club FC Rodina Moscow was promoted to the second-tier Russian First League for the 2022–23 season. Following that, Rodina received a professional license for the 2022–23 season of the Russian Second League for its two farm-teams, Rodina-M and FC Rodina-2 Moscow. Before the 2025–26 season, Rodina-M was renamed to Rodina-3.

== Current squad ==
As of 13 September 2026, according to the Second League website.

Note: Flags indicate national team as defined under FIFA eligibility rules; some limited exceptions apply. Players may hold more than one non-FIFA nationality.

No.	Pos.	Nation	Player
1	GK	RUS	Nikita Pavlov
2	DF	RUS	Danila Gordeyev
4	FW	RUS	Maksim Belkovsky
6	MF	RUS	Artyom Kokarev
7	MF	RUS	Serafim Chekhlov
8	MF	RUS	Dmitry Parusov
9	FW	RUS	Nikita Morozov
10	MF	RUS	Artyom Kriulsky
11	MF	RUS	Daniyar Vakhitov
12	DF	RUS	Vyacheslav Sazonov
13	MF	RUS	Arkhip Kazantsev
14	MF	RUS	Pavel Golubkov
16	GK	RUS	Vladimir Shchepin
17	MF	RUS	Kirill Vorobyov
18	DF	RUS	Timur Tyukayev
19	MF	RUS	Aleksandr Andreyev
21	DF	RUS	Yegor Kartashov
22	FW	RUS	Vyacheslav Khudoklinov

No.	Pos.	Nation	Player
27	DF	RUS	Ivan Makarevich
28	MF	RUS	Ruslan Kukushbayev
29	MF	RUS	Kirill Krol
30	MF	RUS	Nikita Dubrovsky
35	GK	RUS	Vladislav Zaytsev
38	MF	ARM	Artur Mkhitaryan
45	FW	RUS	Artyom Polshakov
59	MF	RUS	Arseny Gerdt (on loan from Lokomotiv Moscow)
70	MF	RUS	Igor Atamansky
71	DF	RUS	Nikita Postnikov
77	FW	RUS	Anton Kamyshenko
78	DF	RUS	Artyom Ananyin
81	DF	RUS	Sergey Sary
85	MF	RUS	Ivan Makarov
93	DF	RUS	Aleksandr Yevstratov
95	GK	RUS	Valery-Lusiano Nzekve
96	MF	RUS	Mark Vysochenko
99	FW	RUS	Igor Andreyev
