= 2024–25 FC Rodina Moscow season =

FC Rodina Moscow
2024–25 season
- Manager: Vladimir Gazzayev
- Stadium: Rodina
- Russian First League: 4th
- Russian Cup: Pre-season

The 2024–25 season is the ninth season in the history of FC Rodina Moscow, and the club's third consecutive season in the Russian First League. In addition to the domestic league, the team is scheduled to participate in the Russian Cup.

== Transfers ==
=== Out ===
Pos.	Player	Transferred from	Fee	Date	Source
FW	(Russia) Ivan Timoshenko	(Russia) Akron Tolyatti	Loan	17 July 2024	

== Friendlies ==
=== Pre-season ===
30 June 2024 Friendly	Lokomotiv Moscow (Russia)	0–1	(Russia) Rodina Moscow	Bakovka
12:00			Yushin 20'	Stadium: Stadion Bakovka

== Competitions ==
=== Overall record ===
Competition	First match	Last match	Starting round	Record							
Competition	First match	Last match	Starting round	Pld	W	D	L	GF	GA	GD	Win %
Russian First League	14 July 2024		Matchday 1	3	2	1	0	2	0	+2	66.67
Russian Cup				0	0	0	0	0	0	+0	—
Total				3	2	1	0	2	0	+2	66.67

Last updated: 28 July 2024
Source: Soccerway

=== Russian First League ===
==== League table ====
Pos	Team	Pld	W	D	L	GF	GA	GD	Pts	Promotion, qualification or relegation
5	Sochi (O, P)	34	16	9	9	55	34	+21	57	Qualification to Premier League play-offs
6	SKA-Khabarovsk	34	15	8	11	44	41	+3	53	
7	Rodina Moscow	34	13	11	10	41	31	+10	50	
8	Yenisey Krasnoyarsk	34	14	7	13	36	39	−3	49	
9	Rotor Volgograd	34	11	14	9	32	26	+6	47	

Source: Soccerway
Rules for classification: 1) Points; 2) Head-to-head points; 3) Head-to-head matches won; 4) Head-to-head goal difference; 5) Head-to-head goals scored; 6) Head-to-head away goals scored; 7) Matches won; 8) Goal difference; 9) Goals scored; 10) Away matches won; 11) Away goals scored; 12) Best disciplinary record (3 points for red card, 1 point for yellow card); 13) Drawing lots. If teams tied on points did not play an equal number of head-to-head games, head-to-head criteria and disciplinary record are not used for positioning. If 1st- and 2nd-placed teams are tied in the final standings on the first 12 criteria, a winner is determined in an additional play-off game, with no extra time and a penalty-shootout if tied at the end of regulation, instead of drawing lots.
(O) Play-off winners; (P) Promoted

==== Results summary ====
Overall								Home						Away					
Pld	W	D	L	GF	GA	GD	Pts	W	D	L	GF	GA	GD	W	D	L	GF	GA	GD
3	2	1	0	2	0	+2	7	1	1	0	1	0	+1	1	0	0	1	0	+1

Last updated: 28 July 2024.

==== Results by round ====
Round	1	2	3	4
Ground	H	H	A	H
Result	D	W	W	
Position	12			

Updated to match(es) played on 28 July 2024. Source:
A = Away; H = Home; W = Win; D = Draw; L = Loss

==== Matches ====
The tentative match schedule was released on 27 June.

14 July 2024 1	Rodina Moscow	0–0	Baltika Kaliningrad	Moscow
19:30 UTC+3				Stadium: Sapsan Arena; Attendance: 758; Referee: Anton Frolov

20 July 2024 2	Rodina Moscow	1–0	SKA-Khabarovsk	Moscow
20:00 UTC+3	Reyna 22'			Stadium: Sapsan Arena; Attendance: 587; Referee: German Kovalenko

28 July 2024 3	Alania Vladikavkaz	0–1	Rodina Moscow	Grozny
19:30 UTC+3			Gordyushenko 71'	Stadium: Sultan Bilimkhanov Stadium; Attendance: 586; Referee: Inal Tanashev

4 August 2024 4	Rodina Moscow	v	KAMAZ Naberezhnye Chelny	Moscow
20:00 UTC+3				Stadium: Sapsan Arena
