= FC Rodina-2 Moscow =

Russian football team based in Moscow

- Full name: Football Club Rodina-2 Moscow
- Founded: 2022
- Chairman: Konstantin Arkhipov
- Manager: Barsegh Kirakosyan
- League: Russian Second League, Division A, Gold Group
- 2025–26: Second Stage: 8th
- Website: https://fcrodina.com/2/

FC Rodina-2 Moscow (Russian: ФК «Родина-2») is a Russian football team based in Moscow. It was founded in 2022. It is a farm club for FC Rodina Moscow.

== Club history ==
Moscow-based club FC Rodina Moscow was promoted to the second-tier Russian First League for the 2022–23 season. Following that, Rodina received a professional license for the 2022–23 season of the Russian Second League for its two farm-teams, FC Rodina-M Moscow and Rodina-2.

== Current squad ==
As of 11 September 2026, according to the Second League website.

Note: Flags indicate national team as defined under FIFA eligibility rules; some limited exceptions apply. Players may hold more than one non-FIFA nationality.

No.	Pos.	Nation	Player
1	GK	RUS	Sergey Aydarov
2	DF	RUS	Ilya Gorbachyov
15	DF	RUS	Dmitry Shadrintsev
18	FW	RUS	Magomedkhabib Abdusalamov
19	MF	RUS	Denis Tikhonov
21	DF	RUS	Dmitri Tananeyev
22	DF	RUS	Artyom Beskibalny
23	MF	RUS	Kirill Ushatov
24	MF	RUS	Mikhail Maltsev
27	DF	RUS	Kirill Larionov
30	MF	RUS	Maksim Danilin
33	GK	RUS	Aleksandr Stenyakin
38	MF	RUS	Leon Musayev
41	MF	RUS	Yegor Ushakov
44	DF	RUS	Pavel Baranov
49	DF	RUS	Ilya Dyatlov
35	GK	RUS	Roman Tarasov

No.	Pos.	Nation	Player
52	DF	RUS	Timofey Danilov
69	DF	RUS	Astemir Khezhev
70	MF	RUS	Vladislav Samko
71	GK	RUS	Ilya Svinov
72	MF	RUS	Astemir Gordyushenko
74	DF	RUS	Denis Mushkarin
76	MF	RUS	Nikita Savin
78	MF	RUS	Magomed Omarov
79	MF	RUS	Daniel Svintsov
81	MF	RUS	Vagan Manukyan
82	GK	RUS	Timofey Vorobyov
83	DF	RUS	Aleksandr Lazarev
89	MF	RUS	Ruslan Maltsev
90	FW	RUS	Ivan Vozrastov
92	FW	RUS	Gleb Knyazev
98	MF	RUS	Arseny Khorin
