= FC Rodina Moscow =

Russian football team based in Moscow, Russia

Rodina Moscow
- Full name: Football Club Rodina Moscow
- Nickname: The Birds
- Founded: 2015; 11 years ago
- Ground: Arena Khimki, Khimki
- Capacity: 14,950
- Coordinates: 55°48′36″N 37°42′36″E
- Owner: Sergey Lomakin
- General director: Konstantin Arkhipov
- Manager: Jonatan Alba
- League: Russian Premier League
- 2025–26: Russian First League, 1st of 18 (promoted)
- Website: fcrodina.com
Home colours	Away colours

FC Rodina Moscow (Russian: ФК «Родина» Москва) is a Russian professional football team based in Moscow. It made its debut in the Russian Premier League in the 2026–27 season.

== History ==
It was founded in 2019 as a senior squad of a pre-existing youth academy. For 2019–20 season, it received the license for the third-tier Russian Professional Football League.

The club finished 4th in the 2021 Korantina Homes Cup International football tournament in Pafos, Cyprus, having been runners up in 2019.

On 30 May 2022, Rodina secured promotion to Russian First League.

In their first season in the second tier, Rodina secured 5th place. As 3rd-placed Alania Vladikavkaz failed to obtain the 2023–24 Russian Premier League license, that qualified Rodina for the promotion play-offs. After losing the first leg of the play-off series at home to FC Pari Nizhny Novgorod with the score of 0–3, Rodina went up 2–0 in the away second leg by the 24th minute of the game. No more goals were scored in the game and Rodina lost 2–3 on aggregate.

In the 2025–26 season, Rodina secured a Top-2 finish and direct Russian Premier League promotion for the first time in its history.

== Stadium ==
From 2019 to 2022 the club has hosted their home games in several stadiums in and around Moscow like Yantar, Oktyabr, Spartakovets, VTB Arena and Avangard in Domodedovo. It started playing at Arena Khimki in 2025.

== Current squad ==
As of 27 September 2026, according to the Premier League website.

Note: Flags indicate national team as defined under FIFA eligibility rules; some limited exceptions apply. Players may hold more than one non-FIFA nationality.

No.	Pos.	Nation	Player
1	GK	RUS	Sergey Aydarov
2	DF	BRA	Igor Silva
3	DF	RUS	Leo Goglichidze
5	MF	RUS	Andrei Yegorychev
6	MF	RUS	Ruslan Fishchenko
7	FW	RUS	German Onugkha
8	MF	ESP	Iker Pozo
9	FW	RUS	Artyom Maksimenko
10	MF	PER	Yordy Reyna
11	FW	ARG	Braian Mansilla (on loan from Akhmat Grozny)
13	GK	RUS	Sergey Volkov
15	DF	RUS	Dmitry Shadrintsev
17	MF	RUS	Soltmurad Bakayev
18	FW	RUS	Magomedkhabib Abdusalamov
19	DF	RUS	Dmitri Tananeyev

No.	Pos.	Nation	Player
20	DF	COL	Deiver Machado
23	MF	RUS	Kirill Ushatov
26	DF	RUS	Artyom Meshchaninov
38	MF	RUS	Leon Musayev
49	DF	RUS	Ilya Dyatlov
50	DF	BRA	Rodrigo Becão (on loan from Fenerbahçe)
55	DF	SLO	Mitja Križan
71	GK	RUS	Ilya Svinov
72	MF	RUS	Astemir Gordyushenko
75	DF	FRA	Mickaël Nadé (on loan from United (Dubai))
77	FW	ARM	Artur Gharibyan
80	DF	RUS	Stanislav Bessmertny (on loan from Dynamo Moscow)
88	DF	RUS	Artyom Sokol
95	FW	GUI	Kerfala Cissoko
99	FW	RUS	Ivan Timoshenko

=== Out on loan ===
Note: Flags indicate national team as defined under FIFA eligibility rules; some limited exceptions apply. Players may hold more than one non-FIFA nationality.

No.	Pos.	Nation	Player
—	GK	RUS	Danil Ladokha (at Torpedo Moscow until 30 June 2027)
—	DF	RUS	Aleksandr Alyokhin (at Arsenal Tula until 30 June 2027)
—	DF	RUS	Georgy Yudintsev (at Rotor Volgograd until 30 June 2027)

No.	Pos.	Nation	Player
—	MF	PAR	Teodoro Arce (at Emelec until 30 June 2027)
—	MF	RUS	Artyom Biryukov (at Arsenal Tula until 30 June 2027)
—	FW	SEN	Pape Guèye (at Dubai United until 30 June 2027)

== Honours ==
- Russian Second Division
  - Champions (1): 2025–26
- Russian Third Division
  - Champions (1): 2021–22

== Notable players ==
Had international caps for their respective countries. Players whose name is listed in bold represented their countries while playing for Rodina.

Europe

- (Armenia) **Artur Garibyan**
- (Belarus) **Artem Kontsevoy**

Africa

- (Guinea) **Kerfala Cissoko**
- (Guinea) Mamadou Kané

South America

- (Colombia) Deiver Machado
- (Peru) Yordy Reyna
