= 2023–24 FC Rostov season =

FC Rostov
2023–24 season
- Manager: Valery Karpin
- Stadium: Rostov Arena
- Premier League: 7th
- Russian Cup: Regions path Semi-finals Stage 1
- Top goalscorer: League: Yegor Golenkov (8); All: Yegor Golenkov (9)
- Highest home attendance: 30,593 vs Spartak Moscow (21 April 2024)
- Lowest home attendance: 6,941 vs Pari NN (26 November 2023)
- Average home league attendance: 12,757 (25 May 2024)

The 2023–24 season was FC Rostov's 94th season in existence and the club's 15th consecutive season in the top flight of Russian football. In addition to the domestic league, Rostov participated in this season's editions of the Russian Cup.

== Season events ==
On 12 January, Rostov announced the signing of Ronaldo from Levski Sofia.

On 30 January, Rostov announced the signing of Oumar Sako on loan from Arda Kardzhali.

On 4 February, Rostov announced the signing of Eyad El Askalany from Ismaily.

== Squad ==
As of match played 25 May 2024

No.	Name	Nationality	Position	Date of birth (age)	Signed from	Signed in	Contract ends	Apps.	Goals
Goalkeepers
1	Nikita Medvedev	(Russia)	GK	17 December 1994 (aged 29)	Rubin Kazan	2022		40	0
30	Sergei Pesyakov	(Russia)	GK	16 December 1988 (aged 35)	Spartak Moscow	2017		182	0
78	Mikhail Tsulaya	(Russia)	GK	8 February 2005 (aged 19)	Academy	2022		1	0
Defenders
3	Oumar Sako	(Ivory Coast)	DF	4 May 1996 (aged 28)	on loan from Arda Kardzhali	2024		14	0
4	Viktor Melyokhin	(Russia)	DF	16 December 2003 (aged 20)	Academy	2021		80	1
5	Denis Terentyev	(Russia)	DF	13 August 1992 (aged 31)	Zenit St.Petersburg	2020		162	2
28	Yevgeni Chernov	(Russia)	DF	23 October 1992 (aged 31)	Krasnodar	2023		111	3
34	Eyad El Askalany	(Egypt)	DF	24 December 2004 (aged 19)	Ismaily	2024		6	0
40	Ilya Vakhaniya	(Russia)	DF	14 January 2001 (aged 23)	Zenit St.Petersburg	2023		33	1
41	Artur Maksetsov	(Russia)	DF	19 April 2004 (aged 20)	Academy	2023		1	0
44	Ilya Kirsh	(Russia)	DF	21 September 2004 (aged 19)	on loan from Zenit St.Petersburg	2023		3	0
55	Maksim Osipenko	(Russia)	DF	16 May 1994 (aged 30)	Tambov	2020		130	16
64	David Semenchuk	(Russia)	DF	22 October 2004 (aged 19)	Academy	2023		9	0
67	German Ignatov	(Russia)	DF	11 August 2005 (aged 18)	Academy	2023		3	1
82	Ivan Kuznetsov	(Russia)	DF	15 February 2004 (aged 20)	Academy	2023		1	0
87	Andrei Langovich	(Russia)	DF	28 May 2003 (aged 20)	Academy	2020		79	4
Midfielders
8	Aleksei Mironov	(Russia)	MF	1 January 2000 (aged 24)	Lokomotiv Moscow	2022	2027	52	2
9	Mohammad Mohebi	(Iran)	MF	20 December 1998 (aged 25)	Santa Clara	2023		29	6
15	Danil Glebov	(Russia)	MF	3 November 1999 (aged 24)	Anzhi Makhachkala	2019		168	11
19	Khoren Bayramyan	(Armenia)	MF	7 January 1992 (aged 32)	Academy	2011		210	11
47	Daniil Utkin	(Russia)	MF	12 October 1999 (aged 24)	Krasnodar	2022		65	4
51	Aleksey Koltakov	(Russia)	MF	14 November 2005 (aged 18)	Academy	2024		9	0
58	Daniil Shantaly	(Russia)	MF	25 May 2004 (aged 20)	Academy	2022		2	0
60	Kirill Stolbov	(Russia)	MF	8 April 2004 (aged 20)	on loan from Zenit St.Petersburg	2023		0	0
62	Ivan Komarov	(Russia)	MF	15 April 2003 (aged 21)	Academy	2020		41	3
73	Imran Aznaurov	(Russia)	MF	23 August 2004 (aged 19)	Academy	2024		6	0
88	Kirill Shchetinin	(Russia)	MF	17 January 2002 (aged 22)	Zenit St.Petersburg	2022		85	8
97	Ilya Zubenko	(Russia)	MF	29 May 2006 (aged 17)	Academy	2024		2	0
Forwards
7	Ronaldo	(Brazil)	FW	7 December 2000 (aged 23)	Levski Sofia	2024		15	6
27	Nikolay Komlichenko	(Russia)	FW	29 June 1995 (aged 28)	Dynamo Moscow	2022	2026	93	26
53	Kirill Moiseyev	(Russia)	FW	28 May 2004 (aged 19)	Torpedo Vladimir	2021		1	0
69	Yegor Golenkov	(Russia)	FW	7 July 1999 (aged 24)	Sigma Olomouc	2022	2027	88	17
91	Anton Shamonin	(Russia)	FW	28 March 2005 (aged 19)	Academy	2024		1	0
Youth team
Contracts suspended
	Dennis Hadžikadunić	(Bosnia and Herzegovina)	DF	9 July 1998 (aged 25)	Malmö FF	2018		69	3
	Pontus Almqvist	(Sweden)	MF	10 July 1999 (aged 24)	IFK Norrköping	2020	2025	39	3
	Armin Gigović	(Bosnia and Herzegovina)	MF	6 April 2002 (aged 22)	Helsingborgs IF	2020	2025	30	1
	Ali Sowe	(The Gambia)	FW	14 June 1994 (aged 29)	CSKA Sofia	2021	2025	31	7
Out on loan
18	Danila Prokhin	(Russia)	DF	24 May 2001 (aged 23)	Zenit St.Petersburg	2021		40	1
23	Roman Tugarev	(Russia)	MF	22 July 1998 (aged 25)	Lokomotiv Moscow	2021		73	8
71	Nikolai Poyarkov	(Russia)	DF	16 October 1999 (aged 24)	Lokomotiv Moscow	2019		37	0
76	Danila Sukhomlinov	(Russia)	MF	31 August 2002 (aged 21)	Academy	2020		27	0
	Danil Ryazanov	(Russia)	GK	11 August 2003 (aged 20)	Academy	2023		0	0
	Igor Kalinin	(Ukraine)	DF	11 November 1995 (aged 28)	Ural Yekaterinburg	2021		15	0
	Nikita Kotin	(Russia)	DF	1 September 2002 (aged 21)	Unattached	2021		1	0
	Magnus Knudsen	(Norway)	MF	15 June 2001 (aged 22)	Lillestrøm	2022		1	0
	Stepan Melnikov	(Russia)	MF	25 April 2002 (aged 22)	Spartak Moscow	2022		23	2
	Maksim Turishchev	(Russia)	FW	5 March 2002 (aged 22)	Academy	2021		8	0
Left during the season
7	Roman Akbashev	(Russia)	MF	1 November 1991 (aged 32)	Fakel Voronezh	2023		12	0
11	Aleksei Ionov	(Russia)	MF	18 February 1989 (aged 35)	Krasnodar	2023		104	18
26	David Toshevski	(North Macedonia)	FW	16 July 2001 (aged 22)	Rabotnički	2020		11	0
	Maksim Rudakov	(Russia)	GK	22 January 1996 (aged 28)	Zenit St.Petersburg	2020	2024	1	0

== Transfers ==
=== In ===
Date	Position	Nationality	Name	From	Fee	Ref.
12 January 2024	FW	(Brazil)	Ronaldo	Levski Sofia	Undisclosed	
4 February 2024	DF	(Egypt)	Eyad El Askalany	Ismaily	Undisclosed	

=== Loans in ===
Date from	Position	Nationality	Name	From	Date to	Ref.
30 January 2024	DF	(Ivory Coast)	Oumar Sako	Arda Kardzhali		

=== Out ===
Date	Position	Nationality	Name	To	Fee	Ref.
19 July 2023	DF	(Russia)	Konstantin Kovalyov	Leon Saturn Ramenskoye	Undisclosed	
9 February 2024	GK	(Russia)	Maksim Rudakov	Sochi	Undisclosed	
8 April 2024	MF	(Russia)	Abdullo Dzhebov	Spartak-2 Moscow		

=== Loans out ===
Date from	Position	Nationality	Name	To	Date to	Ref.
1 January 2022	GK	(Russia)	Maksim Rudakov	Honka	31 December 2023	
27 December 2023	DF	(Russia)	Danila Prokhin	Orenburg	End of season	
16 February 2024	MF	(Russia)	Roman Tugarev	Torpedo Moscow	End of season	
22 February 2024	GK	(Russia)	Aleksandr Dyachkov	Mashuk-KMV Pyatigorsk		

=== Released ===
Date	Position	Nationality	Name	Joined	Date	Ref.
7 September 2023	FW	(North Macedonia)	David Toshevski	Austria Klagenfurt	31 January 2024	
12 December 2023	MF	(Russia)	Aleksei Ionov	Ural Yekaterinburg	22 February 2024	
31 December 2023	DF	(Russia)	Kirill Ivanov			
31 December 2023	MF	(Russia)	Alibeg Akhmedov			
31 December 2023	MF	(Russia)	Yaroslav Kuzmin			
17 January 2024	MF	(Russia)	Roman Akbashev	Fakel Voronezh	17 January 2024	
30 June 2024	GK	(Russia)	Sergei Pesyakov	Krylia Sovetov	1 July 2024	
30 June 2024	DF	(Russia)	Denis Terentyev	Baltika Kaliningrad	16 July 2024	

== Competitions ==
=== Overview ===
Competition	First match	Last match	Starting round	Final position	Record							
Competition	First match	Last match	Starting round	Final position	Pld	W	D	L	GF	GA	GD	Win %
Premier League	21 July 2023	25 May 2024	Matchday 1	7th	30	12	7	11	43	46	−3	40.00
Russian Cup	27 July 2023	2 May 2024	Group stage	Regions path Semi-finals Stage 2	11	4	3	4	11	12	−1	36.36
Total					41	16	10	15	54	58	−4	39.02

Last updated: 25 May 2024
Source: Competitions

=== Premier League ===
==== League table ====
Pos	Team	Pld	W	D	L	GF	GA	GD	Pts
5	Spartak Moscow	30	14	8	8	41	32	+9	50
6	CSKA Moscow	30	12	12	6	56	40	+16	48
7	Rostov	30	12	7	11	43	46	−3	43
8	Rubin Kazan	30	11	9	10	31	38	−7	42
9	Krylia Sovetov Samara	30	11	8	11	46	44	+2	41

Source: Premier Liga
Rules for classification: 1) Points; 2) Head-to-head points; 3) Head-to-head matches won; 4) Head-to-head goal difference; 5) Head-to-head goals scored; 6) Matches won; 7) Goal difference; 8) Goals scored; 9) 2022–23 position (not applicable to final standings); 10) Play-off. Note: if teams tied on points played an equal number of head-to-head games, head-to-head results are considered in aggregate, in a separate 'table'. If teams tied on points played a different number of head-to-head games, head-to-head criteria are considered in one-on-one pairs for each team against each other, then the teams are ordered by the number of one-on-one matchups they have advantage in.

==== Results summary ====
Overall								Home						Away					
Pld	W	D	L	GF	GA	GD	Pts	W	D	L	GF	GA	GD	W	D	L	GF	GA	GD
30	12	7	11	43	46	−3	43	9	4	2	28	19	+9	3	3	9	15	27	−12

Last updated: 25 May 2024.
Source: See Results

==== Results by round ====
Round	1	2	3	4	5	6	7	8	9	10	11	12	13	14	15	16	17	18	19	20	22	23	24	25	21^{1}	26	27	28	29	30
Ground	H	H	A	H	A	A	H	A	H	H	A	H	H	A	A	H	A	A	H	H	A	H	A	H	A	H	A	A	H	A
Result	W	D	L	W	L	L	L	D	D	D	L	W	W	D	L	W	L	D	W	W	W	D	W	L	W	W	L	L	W	L
Position	5	4	8	7	8	10	11	12	11	12	14	10	9	11	11	10	10	10	10	10	9	9	8	8	8	7	7	9	7	7

Updated to match(es) played on 25 May 2024. Source: See Results
A = Away; H = Home; W = Win; D = Draw; L = Loss
Notes:
- ^{1}

==== Matches ====
The league fixtures were unveiled on 24 June 2023.

23 July 2023 1	Rostov	2–1	Fakel Voronezh	Rostov-on-Don
20:00 MSK (UTC+3)	Osipenko 39'; Utkin (yellow card) 45'; Tugarev 56'; Bayramyan (yellow card) 67'	Report	Markov 17' (yellow card) 42'; Kudryashov (yellow card) 20'; Mendel (yellow card) 58'	Stadium: Rostov Arena; Attendance: 11,020; Referee: Pavel Shadykhanov

29 July 2023 2	Rostov	1–1	Zenit St.Petersburg	Rostov-on-Don
20:00 MSK (UTC+3)	Bayramyan (yellow card) 50'; Akbashev (yellow card) 68'; Terentjev (yellow card) 88'; Mironov (yellow card) 90+2'; Komlichenko 90+3' (pen.)	Report	Cassierra 43'; Mantuan (yellow card) 50'	Stadium: Rostov Arena; Attendance: 16,413; Referee: Yevgeni Kukulyak

5 August 2023 3	Krylia Sovetov	5–1	Rostov	Samara
15:00 MSK (UTC+3)	Khubulov 4'; Saltykov 10', 35'; Karpitsky 73'; Bijl (yellow card) 76'; Yezhov 90+' (pen.)	Report	Komlichenko 22' (yellow card) 34'; Mironov (yellow card) 40'; Mohebi (yellow card) 76'; Pesyakov (yellow card) 90+'	Stadium: Solidarnost Samara Arena; Attendance: 6,125; Referee: Sergei Karasev

12 August 2023 4	Rostov	3–0	Rubin Kazan	Rostov-on-Don
20:00 MSK (UTC+3)	Akbashev (yellow card) 21'; Komlichenko 52'; Langovich 78'; Golenkov 88'	Report	Rakhmonaliev (yellow card) 38'; Iwu (yellow card) 81'	Stadium: Rostov Arena; Attendance: 10,328; Referee: Aleksei Eskov

19 August 2023 5	Sochi	4–0	Rostov	Sochi
20:00 MSK (UTC+3)	Kramarič 16', 69'; Đorđević 28'; Medveděv 78'	Report	Prokhin (yellow card) 34'	Stadium: Fisht Olympic Stadium; Attendance: 6,299; Referee: Roman Galimov

26 August 2023 6	Pari NN	1–0	Rostov	Nizhny Novgorod
20:00 MSK (UTC+3)	Suleymanov (penalty missed) 60'; Kalinsky 60'; Nigmatullin (yellow card) 90'	Report		Stadium: Nizhny Novgorod Stadium; Attendance: 6,697; Referee: Sergey Cheban

3 September 2023 7	Rostov	1–2	Dynamo Moscow	Rostov-on-Don
20:00 MSK (UTC+3)	Komlichenko (yellow card) 2'; Tugarev (yellow card) 21' (yellow-red card) 34'; Melekhin (yellow card) 74'; Grulev 90' (o.g.)	Report	Makarov 10', (yellow card) 22'; Laxalt (yellow card) 29'; Ngamaleu 42'; Shunin (yellow card) 90+5'	Stadium: Rostov Arena; Attendance: 11,001; Referee: Vasili Kazartsev

16 September 2023 8	Baltika Kaliningrad	2–2	Rostov	Kaliningrad
21:15 MSK (UTC+3)	Guzina (yellow card) 62'; Henríquez 86'; Bistrović 90+'	Report	Utkin 16'; Golenkov 43'; Bayramyan (yellow card) 61'	Stadium: Kaliningrad Stadium; Attendance: 11,712; Referee: Evgeny Turbin

24 September 2023 9	Rostov	3–3	CSKA Moscow	Rostov-on-Don
19:00 MSK (UTC+3)	Mironov 7'; Golenkov 12', 50'; Prokhin (yellow card) 90+3'	Report	Khellven 26'; Chalov (yellow card) 45+2', (goal) 65'; Fayzullaev 70'	Stadium: Rostov Arena; Attendance: 15,050; Referee: Sergei Karasev

29 September 2023 10	Rostov	2–2	Ural Yekaterinburg	Rostov-on-Don
19:00 MSK (UTC+3)	Osipenko 33' (pen.); Vakhaniya 46'; Bayramyan (yellow card) 70'; Melyokhin (yellow card) 90+'	Report	Guilherme 4'; Yegorychev 17' (red card) 79'; Kulakov (yellow card) 41'; Begić (yellow card) 77'; Kashtanov (yellow card) 90+'	Stadium: Rostov Arena; Attendance: 7,856; Referee: Roman Galimov

7 October 2023 11	Krasnodar	3–2	Rostov	Krasnodar
19:00 MSK (UTC+3)	Volkov (yellow card) 15'; Spertsyan 50' (yellow card) 61'; Chernikov (yellow card) 51'; Kady (yellow card) 60'; Komlichenko 80' (o.g.); Córdoba 90+'	Report	Glebov 23'; Mohebi 41' (yellow card) 71'; Melyokhin (yellow card) 54'; Komlichenko (yellow card) 78'	Stadium: Krasnodar Stadium; Attendance: 27,375; Referee: Rafael Shafeev

22 October 2023 12	Rostov	3–0	Akhmat Grozny	Rostov
19:00 MSK (UTC+3)	Golenkov 34'; Osipenko 41' (pen.); Mohebi 53'; Tugarev (yellow card) 86'	Report	Todorović (yellow card) 16'; Shvets (yellow card) 36'; Kharin (yellow card) 39'	Stadium: Rostov Arena; Attendance: 8,707; Referee: Kirill Levnikov

28 October 2023 13	Rostov	1–0	Lokomotiv Moscow	Rostov-on-Don
16:30 MSK (UTC+3)	Shchetinin 3'; Melehin (yellow card) 24'	Report	Barinov (yellow card) 48'; Nenakhov (yellow card) 55'	Stadium: Rostov Arena; Attendance: 11,487; Referee: Patrick Suchy

6 November 2023 14	Orenburg	1–1	Rostov	Orenburg
14:00 MSK (UTC+3)	Florentín (yellow card) 32'; Obukhov (yellow card) 45+'; Pérez (yellow card) 51'; Vorobyov 71'; Marín (yellow card) 76'; Mansilla (yellow card) 88'	Report	Osipenko (penalty missed) 32' 85'; Shchetinin (yellow card) 45+'; Bayramyan (yellow card) 77'	Stadium: Gazovik Stadium; Attendance: 3,256; Referee: Roman Safyan

12 November 2023 15	Spartak Moscow	2–1	Rostov	Moscow
19:30 MSK (UTC+3)	Ignatov 4'; Promes 15'	Report	Osipenko 81' (pen.)	Stadium: Otkritie Arena; Attendance: 10,517; Referee: Kirill Levnikov

26 November 2023 16	Rostov	1–0	Pari NN	Rostov-on-Don
19:00 MSK (UTC+3)	Osipenko 61' (pen.); Golenkov (yellow card) 72'; Komlichenko (yellow card) 81'; Melyokhin (yellow card) 87'	Report	Kalinsky (yellow card) 37'; Stotsky (yellow card) 45+'; Shnaptsev (yellow card) 77'; Karapuzov (yellow card) 90+'	Stadium: Rostov Arena; Attendance: 6,941; Referee: Yan Bobrovsky

3 December 2023 17	CSKA Moscow	2–0	Rostov	Moscow
14:00 MSK (UTC+3)	Chalov 4' (pen.); Méndez 69'	Report	Golenkov (yellow card) 32'; Komarov (yellow card) 81'; Melekhin (red card) 90+2'	Stadium: VEB Arena; Attendance: 4,791; Referee: Rafael Shafeev

9 December 2023 18	Akhmat Grozny	0–0	Rostov	Grozny
16:30 MSK (UTC+3)	Agalarov (yellow card) 45+'; Camilo (yellow card) 65'; Agalarov (yellow card) 45+'; Shvets (yellow card) 90+'	Report	Vakhaniya (yellow card) 61'; Utkin (yellow card) 64'; Prokhin (yellow card) 90+'; Langovich (red card) 90+'	Stadium: Akhmat-Arena; Attendance: 5,091; Referee: Yan Bobrovsky

1 March 2024 19	Rostov	2–0	Krylia Sovetov	Rostov-on-Don
19:00 MSK (UTC+3)	Golenkov 29' (yellow card) 41'; Sako (yellow card) 46'; Komarov 80'	Report	Vityugov (yellow card) 3'	Stadium: Rostov Arena; Attendance: 8,850; Referee: Evgeniy Kukulyak

8 March 2024 20	Rostov	2–1	Krasnodar	Rostov-on-Don
18:30 MSK (UTC+3)	Mohebi 25', 62'; Bayramyan (yellow card) 35'; Shchetinin (yellow card) 51'; Sako (yellow card) 59'; Chernov (yellow card) 61'; Osipenko (yellow card) 76'	Report	Chernikov (yellow card) 30'; Tormena (yellow card) 40'; Olusegun (yellow card) 42' (yellow-red card) 49'; Pina (yellow card) 44'; Córdoba 66'; Olaza (yellow card) 90+'	Stadium: Rostov Arena; Attendance: 16,668; Referee: Vasily Kazartsev

29 March 2024 22	Dynamo Moscow	1–4	Rostov	Moscow
19:30 MSK (UTC+3)	Bitello 79'; Ngamaleu (yellow card) 85'	Report	Shchetinin 22'; Glebov 32'; Mohebi 42', 57'; Ronaldo (yellow card) 52'; Komarov (yellow card) 85'	Stadium: VTB Arena; Attendance: 8,052; Referee: Pavel Kukuyan

6 April 2024 23	Rostov	2–2	Sochi	Rostov-on-Don
20:00 MSK (UTC+3)	Golenkov 1'; Ronaldo 45+'; Sako (yellow card) 52'; Mohebi (yellow card) 85'	Report	Kravtsov 6'; Guarirapa 35' (yellow card) 86'; Córdova (yellow card) 64'; Zaika (yellow card) 90+'; Litvinov (yellow card) 90+'	Stadium: Rostov Arena; Attendance: 13,770; Referee: Evgeniy Kukulyak

14 April 2024 24	Fakel Voronezh	0–1	Rostov	Voronezh
16:45 MSK (UTC+3)	Kalinin (yellow card) 6'; Moțpan (yellow card) 7'; Kvekveskiri (yellow card) 48'; Alshin (yellow card) 60'	Report	Bayramyan (yellow card) 23'; Sako (yellow card) 52'; Ronaldo 83'	Stadium: Tsentralnyi Profsoyuz Stadion; Attendance: 13,744; Referee: Artyom Lyubimov

21 April 2024 25	Rostov	1–5	Spartak Moscow	Rostov-on-Don
20:30 MSK (UTC+3)	Osipenko (yellow card) 12'; Mohebi (yellow card) 15'; Golenkov 36'; Chernov (yellow card) 45+'	Report	Khlusevich 16'; Babić (yellow card) 39'; Medina 54', 60' (pen.); Martins 76'; Sobolev (yellow card) 80'; Bongonda 90+'	Stadium: Rostov Arena; Attendance: 30,593; Referee: Vladimir Moskalyov

25 April 2024 21	Ural Yekaterinburg	0–1	Rostov	Yekaterinburg
16:00 MSK (UTC+3)	Emmerson (yellow card) 41'; Begić (yellow card) 62'	Report	Komlichenko (yellow card) 45+'; Ronaldo 57'; Melyokhin (yellow card) 82'	Stadium: Central Stadium; Attendance: 5,069; Referee: Alexey Sukhoi

29 April 2024 26	Rostov	2–1	Orenburg	Rostov-on-Don
19:45 MSK (UTC+3)	Ronaldo (yellow card) 31' (goal) 81'; Langovich (yellow card) 44'; Komlichenko 90+'	Report	Thompson 12'; Mansilla (yellow card) 41'; Ghorbani (yellow card) 51'; Prokhin (yellow card) 85'	Stadium: Rostov Arena; Attendance: 10,209; Referee: Sergey Cheban

6 May 2024 27	Lokomotiv Moscow	1–0	Rostov	Moscow
20:30 MSK (UTC+3)	Miranchuk 5'; Nyamsi (yellow card) 84'; Karpukas (yellow card) 90'; Lantratov (yellow card) 90+'	Report	El Askalany (yellow card) 19'	Stadium: RZD Arena; Attendance: 6,611; Referee: Pavel Kukuyan

11 May 2024 28	Rubin Kazan	3–1	Rostov	Kazan
14:00 MSK (UTC+3)	Rybus 30'; Martynovich 38'; Jevtić 65'	Report	El Askalany (yellow card) 64' (yellow-red card) 86'; Shchetinin 73'; Komarov (yellow card) 74' (yellow-red card) 74'; Osipenko (penalty missed) 81'	Stadium: Ak Bars Arena; Attendance: 5,666; Referee: Artyom Lyubimov

19 May 2024 29	Rostov	2–1	Baltika Kaliningrad	Rostov-on-Don
16:30 MSK (UTC+3)	Shchetinin 33'; Ronaldo 36'; Langovich (yellow card) 47'; Sako (yellow card) 82'; Koltakov (yellow card) 89'	Report	Fernandes (yellow card) 3'; Fernández (yellow card) 35' (goal) 45+'; Kozlov (yellow card) 57'; Andrade (yellow card) 72'; Osipov (yellow card) 88'	Stadium: Rostov Arena; Attendance: 12,455; Referee: Kirill Levnikov

25 May 2024 30	Zenit St.Petersburg	2–1	Rostov	Saint Petersburg
16:30 MSK (UTC+3)	Karavayev (yellow card) 22'; Mantuan 65' (pen.); Artur 85' (yellow card) 85'	Report	Ronaldo 54'; Sako (yellow card) 61'; Komarov (yellow card) 68'	Stadium: Krestovsky Stadium; Attendance: 36,456; Referee: Vitali Meshkov

=== Russian Cup ===
==== Group stage ====
Pos	Team	Pld	W	PW	PL	L	GF	GA	GD	Pts	Qualification
1	Lokomotiv Moscow	6	4	0	1	1	10	4	+6	13	Qualification to the Knockout phase (RPL path)
2	Rostov	6	3	1	0	2	7	7	0	11	Qualification to the Knockout phase (RPL path)
3	Ural Yekaterinburg	6	2	1	0	3	6	6	0	8	Qualification to the Knockout phase (regions path)
4	Rubin Kazan	6	1	0	1	4	3	9	−6	4	

Source: Russian Football Union (in Russian), Soccerway
Rules for classification: 1) Points; 2) Head-to-head points; 3) Head-to-head matches won; 4) Head-to-head goal difference; 5) Head-to-head goals scored; 6) Matches won; 7) Goal difference; 8) Goals scored; 9) Penalty shoot-out goal difference; 10) Draw.

26 July 2023 1	Rostov	1–0	Rubin Kazan	Rostov-on-Don
20:45 MSK (UTC+3)	Shchetinin (yellow card) 28'; Mironov (yellow card) 50'; Komarov 59'; Melyokhin (yellow card) 90+4'	Report	Bezrukov (yellow card) 38'	Stadium: Rostov Arena; Attendance: 10,429; Referee: Yevgeniy Bulanov

8 August 2023 2	Ural Yekaterinburg	1–0	Rostov	Yekaterinburg
16:15 MSK (UTC+3)	Beveyev (yellow card) 32'; Yushin 41'	Report	Sukhomlinov (yellow card) 37'; Terentyev (yellow card) 78'	Stadium: Yekaterinburg Arena; Attendance: 10,359; Referee: Roman Safyan

30 August 2023 3	Rostov	2–1	Lokomotiv Moscow	Rostov-on-Don
19:30 MSK (UTC+3)	Prokhin (yellow card) 12'; Golenkov 24' (yellow card) 52'; Vakhaniya 37'; Sukhomlinov (yellow card) 40'; Utkin (yellow card) 57'; Glebov (yellow card) 83'	Report	Kuzmichyov (yellow card) 4'; Glushenkov 71'	Stadium: Rostov Arena; Attendance: 15,525; Referee: Vladislav Bezborodov

20 September 2023 4	Rubin Kazan	1–1 (2–4 p)	Rostov	Kazan
17:15 MSK (UTC+3)	Drezgić (yellow card) 45'; Apshatsev 49'	Report	Ignatov 26' (yellow card) 89'; Langovich (yellow card) 71'; Melyokhin (yellow card) 86'	Stadium: Ak Bars Arena; Attendance: 6,040; Referee: Sergey Cheban
	Penalties
	Rakhmonaliev (penalty missed); Vujačić (penalty scored); Konovalov (penalty scored); Drezgić (penalty missed)		(penalty scored) Tugarev; (penalty scored) Golenkov; (penalty scored) Shchetinin; (penalty scored) Ignatov

3 October 2023 5	Lokomotiv Moscow	3–1	Rostov	Moscow
17:15 MSK (UTC+3)	Suleymanov 34'; Morozov (yellow card) 36'; Miranchuk 39'; Glushenkov 59'; Zhemaletdinov (yellow card) 89'; Barinov (yellow card) 90+3'	Report	Prohkin (yellow card) 46'; Osipenko (yellow card) 64' (goal) 89'	Stadium: RZD Arena; Attendance: 7,175; Referee: Artyom Lyubimov

2 November 2023 6	Rostov	2–1	Ural Yekaterinburg	Rostov-on-Don
20:45 MSK (UTC+3)	Komarov (yellow card) 24'; Melyokhin 45'; Komlichenko 67'; Utkin (yellow card) 86'; Medvedev (yellow card) 90+2'	Report	Filipenko (yellow card) 8' (yellow-red card) 84'; Ayupov (yellow card) 47'; Schettine 50'; Sungatulin (yellow card) 59'; Yegorychev (yellow card) 72'	Stadium: Rostov Arena; Attendance: 10,647; Referee: Rafael Shafeyev

==== Knockout stage ====
29 November 2023 RPL path Quarter-finals 1st leg	Rostov	1–1	CSKA Moscow	Rostov-on-Don
18:15 MSK (UTC+3)	Nababkin 8' (o.g.); Prokhin (yellow card) 14'	Report	Dávila (yellow card) 27'; Zabolotnyi 33'; Moisés (red card) 77'	Stadium: Rostov Arena; Attendance: 11,059; Referee: Kirill Levnikov

12 March 2024 RPL path Quarter-finals 2nd leg	CSKA Moscow	2–0 (3–1 agg.)	Rostov	Moscow
20:15 MSK (UTC+3)	Agapov 63'; Khellven (yellow card) 79'; Musaev 84'	Report	Komarov (yellow card) 90'; Mohebi (yellow card) 90+6'	Stadium: VEB Arena; Attendance: 10,969; Referee: Sergei Karasev

2 April 2024 Regions path Quarter-finals Stage 2	Khimki	0–0 (6–7 p)	Rostov	Khimki
20:00 MSK (UTC+3)	Golubović (yellow card) 50'; Yuzepchuk (yellow card) 87'; Terekhov (yellow card) 89'	Report	Melyokhin (yellow card) 46'; Terentyev (yellow card) 48'	Stadium: Arena Khimki; Attendance: 2,514; Referee: Aleksey Sukhoy
	Penalties
	Netfullin (penalty scored); Yuzepchuk (penalty missed); Zhuravlyov (penalty scored); Terekhov (penalty scored); Koryan (penalty scored); Kasimov (penalty scored); Volkov (penalty scored); Isayenko (penalty missed)		(penalty scored) Ronaldo; (penalty scored) Golenkov; (penalty scored) Komarov; (penalty missed) Osipenko; (penalty scored) Mohebi; (penalty scored) Sako; (penalty scored) El Askalany; (penalty scored) Langovich

17 April 2024 Regions path Semi-finals Stage 1	Ural Yekaterinburg	1–3	Rostov	Yekaterinburg
17:00 MSK (UTC+3)	Kiki (yellow card) 6'; Guilherme 10'; Begić (yellow card) 69'	Report	Langovich (yellow card) 21'; Semenchuk (yellow card) 37'; Komarov 60'; Terentyev 72'; El Askalany (yellow card) 79'; Komlichenko 90+5'	Stadium: Yekaterinburg Arena; Attendance: 11,578; Referee: Vladislav Bezborodov

2 May 2024 Regions path Semi-finals Stage 2	Rostov	0–1	Baltika Kaliningrad	Rostov-on-Don
19:15 MSK (UTC+3)	Aznaurov (yellow card) 27'	Report	Avanesyan 4'; Radmanovac (yellow card) 29'; Latyshonok (yellow card) 90+7'	Stadium: Rostov Arena; Attendance: 15,708; Referee: Kirill Levnikov

== Squad statistics ==
As of match played 25 May 2024

=== Appearances and goals ===
No.	Pos	Nat	Player	Total		Premier League		Russian Cup	
No.	Pos	Nat	Player	Apps	Goals	Apps	Goals	Apps	Goals
1	GK	(Russia) RUS	Nikita Medvedev	17	0	7+1	0	9	0
3	DF	(Ivory Coast) CIV	Oumar Sako	14	0	11	0	2+1	0
4	DF	(Russia) RUS	Viktor Melyokhin	28	1	17+6	0	3+2	1
5	DF	(Russia) RUS	Denis Terentyev	23	1	8+6	0	6+3	1
7	FW	(Brazil) BRA	Ronaldo	15	6	12	6	1+2	0
8	MF	(Russia) RUS	Aleksei Mironov	18	1	11+4	1	2+1	0
9	MF	(Iran) IRI	Mohammad Mohebi	29	6	17+5	6	4+3	0
15	MF	(Russia) RUS	Danil Glebov	39	2	30	2	2+7	0
19	MF	(Armenia) ARM	Khoren Bayramyan	34	0	19+8	0	5+2	0
27	FW	(Russia) RUS	Nikolay Komlichenko	31	6	11+14	4	5+1	2
28	DF	(Russia) RUS	Yevgeni Chernov	27	0	19+4	0	4	0
30	GK	(Russia) RUS	Sergei Pesyakov	25	0	23	0	2	0
34	DF	(Egypt) EGY	Eyad El Askalany	6	0	1+3	0	2	0
40	DF	(Russia) RUS	Ilya Vakhaniya	33	1	26+2	0	2+3	1
41	DF	(Russia) RUS	Artur Maksetsov	1	0	0	0	1	0
44	DF	(Russia) RUS	Ilya Kirsh	3	0	0	0	3	0
47	MF	(Russia) RUS	Daniil Utkin	30	1	20+4	1	4+2	0
51	MF	(Russia) RUS	Aleksey Koltakov	9	0	0+5	0	3+1	0
53	FW	(Russia) RUS	Kirill Moiseyev	1	0	0	0	0+1	0
55	DF	(Russia) RUS	Maksim Osipenko	29	7	23+1	6	2+3	1
58	MF	(Russia) RUS	Daniil Shantaly	2	0	0	0	2	0
62	MF	(Russia) RUS	Ivan Komarov	26	3	3+13	1	6+4	2
64	DF	(Russia) RUS	David Semenchuk	9	0	0+3	0	6	0
67	DF	(Russia) RUS	German Ignatov	3	1	0	0	3	1
69	FW	(Russia) RUS	Yegor Golenkov	39	9	20+10	8	3+6	1
73	MF	(Russia) RUS	Imran Aznaurov	6	0	1+2	0	3	0
82	DF	(Russia) RUS	Ivan Kuznetsov	1	0	0	0	1	0
87	DF	(Russia) RUS	Andrei Langovich	30	1	10+12	1	6+2	0
88	MF	(Russia) RUS	Kirill Shchetinin	33	4	19+6	4	5+3	0
91	FW	(Russia) RUS	Anton Shamonin	1	0	0	0	0+1	0
97	MF	(Russia) RUS	Ilya Zubenko	2	0	0+1	0	0+1	0
Players away from the club on loan:
18	DF	(Russia) RUS	Danila Prokhin	15	0	3+7	0	5	0
23	MF	(Russia) RUS	Roman Tugarev	11	1	4+3	1	4	0
71	DF	(Russia) RUS	Nikolai Poyarkov	3	0	2	0	1	0
76	MF	(Russia) RUS	Danila Sukhomlinov	2	0	0	0	2	0
Players who appeared for Rostov but left during the season:
7	MF	(Russia) RUS	Roman Akbashev	12	0	2+4	0	5+1	0
11	MF	(Russia) RUS	Aleksei Ionov	17	0	11+3	0	2+1	0
26	FW	(North Macedonia) MKD	David Toshevski	2	0	0+1	0	1	0

=== Goal scorers ===
Place	Position	Nation	Number	Name	Premier League	Russian Cup	Total
1	FW	(Russia)	69	Yegor Golenkov	8	1	9
2	DF	(Russia)	55	Maksim Osipenko	6	1	7
3	MF	(Iran)	9	Mohammad Mohebi	6	0	6
3	FW	(Brazil)	7	Ronaldo	6	0	6
3	FW	(Russia)	27	Nikolay Komlichenko	4	2	6
6	MF	(Russia)	88	Kirill Shchetinin	4	0	4
7	MF	(Russia)	62	Ivan Komarov	1	2	3
7				Own goal	2	1	3
9	MF	(Russia)	15	Danil Glebov	2	0	2
10	MF	(Russia)	23	Roman Tugarev	1	0	1
10	DF	(Russia)	87	Andrei Langovich	1	0	1
10	MF	(Russia)	47	Daniil Utkin	1	0	1
10	MF	(Russia)	8	Aleksei Mironov	1	0	1
10	DF	(Russia)	40	Ilya Vakhaniya	0	1	1
10	DF	(Russia)	67	German Ignatov	0	1	1
10	DF	(Russia)	4	Viktor Melyokhin	0	1	1
10	DF	(Russia)	5	Denis Terentyev	0	1	1
Total					43	11	54

=== Clean sheets ===
Place	Position	Nation	Number	Name	Premier League	Russian Cup	Total
1	GK	(Russia)	30	Sergei Pesyakov	6	1	7
2	GK	(Russia)	1	Nikita Medvedev	2	1	3
Total					8	2	10

=== Disciplinary record ===
Number	Nation	Position	Name	Premier League		Russian Cup		Total	
Number	Nation	Position	Name	Booked	Sent off (straight red)	Booked	Sent off (straight red)	Booked	Sent off (straight red)
1	(Russia)	GK	Nikita Medvedev	0	0	1	0	1	0
3	(Ivory Coast)	DF	Oumar Sako	6	0	0	0	6	0
4	(Russia)	DF	Viktor Melyokhin	6	1	3	0	9	1
5	(Russia)	DF	Denis Terentyev	1	0	2	0	3	0
7	(Brazil)	FW	Ronaldo	2	0	0	0	2	0
8	(Russia)	MF	Aleksei Mironov	2	0	1	0	3	0
9	(Iran)	MF	Mohammad Mohebi	4	0	1	0	5	0
15	(Russia)	MF	Danil Glebov	0	0	1	0	1	0
19	(Armenia)	MF	Khoren Bayramyan	7	0	0	0	7	0
27	(Russia)	FW	Nikolay Komlichenko	5	0	0	0	5	0
28	(Russia)	DF	Yevgeni Chernov	2	0	0	0	2	0
30	(Russia)	GK	Sergei Pesyakov	1	0	0	0	1	0
34	(Egypt)	DF	Eyad El Askalany	3	1	1	0	4	1
40	(Russia)	DF	Ilya Vakhaniya	1	0	0	0	1	0
47	(Russia)	MF	Daniil Utkin	2	0	2	0	4	0
51	(Russia)	MF	Aleksey Koltakov	1	0	0	0	1	0
55	(Russia)	DF	Maksim Osipenko	2	0	1	0	3	0
62	(Russia)	MF	Ivan Komarov	5	1	2	0	7	1
64	(Russia)	DF	David Semenchuk	0	0	1	0	1	0
67	(Russia)	DF	German Ignatov	0	0	1	0	1	0
69	(Russia)	FW	Yegor Golenkov	3	0	1	0	4	0
73	(Russia)	MF	Imran Aznaurov	0	0	1	0	1	0
87	(Russia)	DF	Andrei Langovich	2	1	2	0	4	1
88	(Russia)	MF	Kirill Shchetinin	2	0	1	0	3	0
Players away on loan:
18	(Russia)	DF	Danila Prokhin	3	0	3	0	6	0
23	(Russia)	MF	Roman Tugarev	3	1	0	0	3	1
76	(Russia)	MF	Danila Sukhomlinov	0	0	2	0	2	0
Players who left Rostov during the season:
7	(Russia)	MF	Roman Akbashev	2	0	0	0	2	0
Total				65	5	27	0	92	5
