= List of Russian football transfers winter 2023–24 =

This is a list of Russian football transfers in the 2023–24 winter transfer window by club. Only clubs of the 2023–24 Russian Premier League are included.

== Russian Premier League 2023–24 ==
=== Akhmat Grozny ===
In: Note: Flags indicate national team as defined under FIFA eligibility rules; some limited exceptions apply. Players may hold more than one non-FIFA nationality.

No.	Pos.	Nation	Player
4	DF	RUS	Turpal-Ali Ibishev (end of loan to Druzhba Maykop)
5	DF	BIH	Miloš Šatara (return from injury)
14	MF	MAR	Amine Talal (from (Moldova) Sheriff Tiraspol)
36	DF	BRA	Lucas Lovat (from (Slovakia) Slovan Bratislava)
75	DF	TUN	Nader Ghandri (from (United Arab Emirates) Ajman)
—	GK	RUS	Magomed-Deni Tsutsulayev (end of loan to Chayka Peschanokopskoye)

Out: Note: Flags indicate national team as defined under FIFA eligibility rules; some limited exceptions apply. Players may hold more than one non-FIFA nationality.

No.	Pos.	Nation	Player
3	DF	RUS	Vladislav Volkov (on loan to Leningradets Leningrad Oblast)
11	MF	BRA	Daniel Júnior (end of loan from (Brazil) Cruzeiro)
19	DF	KAZ	Marat Bystrov (to (Kazakhstan) Astana)
22	FW	RUS	Akhmed Khazhmuradov
35	GK	RUS	Rizvan Tashayev (to Dynamo Bryansk)
48	DF	RUS	Mikail Akhmedov
53	MF	RUS	Abubakar Apkayev
56	DF	RUS	Kirill Gaydamaka
70	MF	RUS	Bilal Akhyadov
80	FW	RUS	Ibragim Yaratkhanov
87	MF	RUS	Musa Bazhayev
92	MF	RUS	Abubakar Inalkayev
—	FW	RUS	Islam Alsultanov (released, previously on loan to Volga Ulyanovsk)

=== Baltika Kaliningrad ===
In: Note: Flags indicate national team as defined under FIFA eligibility rules; some limited exceptions apply. Players may hold more than one non-FIFA nationality.

No.	Pos.	Nation	Player
8	MF	BLR	Kirill Kaplenko (from Orenburg)
10	FW	GHA	Joel Fameyeh (on loan from Rubin Kazan)
11	MF	BLR	Yury Kavalyow (from Orenburg)
13	DF	VEN	Diego Luna (from (Venezuela) Caracas)
16	DF	COL	Kevin Andrade (from (Colombia) América de Cali)
23	GK	RUS	Ivan Konovalov (from (Kazakhstan) Tobol)
24	MF	RUS	Dmitri Rybchinsky (from Lokomotiv Moscow)
25	FW	BRA	Alex Fernandes (from (Bulgaria) Cherno More Varna)
28	DF	RUS	Ivan Safonov
31	FW	RUS	Yaroslav Banny
36	GK	RUS	Gleb Kosteley (from Dynamo Moscow)
40	FW	RUS	Dmitry Nikitin
43	FW	RUS	Aleksandr Kuzmin (from own U19)
44	DF	RUS	Pavel Gorbachyov (from Torpedo Vladimir)
66	FW	RUS	Nikita Tereshchuk (from Zenit St. Petersburg)
71	FW	BLR	Mark Mokin (from (Belarus) Dnepr Mogilev)
77	MF	RUS	Danila Kozlov (from Zenit St. Petersburg)
78	DF	RUS	Nikolay Edzhibiya (from own U19)
80	MF	RUS	Yaroslav Arbuzov (from CSKA Moscow)
83	MF	RUS	Maksim Kulik (from own U19)
84	DF	RUS	Roman Surmy (from own U19)
86	DF	RUS	Artyom Yashkov (from Baltika-BFU Kaliningrad)
87	MF	RUS	Artyom Isik (from Dynamo Stavropol)
88	FW	BLR	Vitaly Lisakovich (on loan from Rubin Kazan)
91	MF	RUS	Vadim Vshivkov (from Baltika-BFU Kaliningrad)

Out: Note: Flags indicate national team as defined under FIFA eligibility rules; some limited exceptions apply. Players may hold more than one non-FIFA nationality.

No.	Pos.	Nation	Player
8	MF	RUS	Aslan Dudiyev (to Sokol Saratov)
10	MF	RUS	Yan Kazayev (to Chelyabinsk)
13	DF	CHI	Guillermo Soto (to (Chile) Universidad Católica)
16	GK	RUS	Aleksandr Koryakin (on loan to Rodina Moscow)
20	MF	ARM	Artur Galoyan (to Akron Tolyatti)
22	FW	RUS	Tamerlan Musayev (to CSKA Moscow)
23	DF	RUS	Aleksandr Putsko (to (Armenia) Urartu)
24	MF	RUS	Islam Mokayev
25	DF	RUS	Artur Koloskov (to Veles Moscow)
45	FW	RUS	Nikita Luzan
47	MF	RUS	Ibragim Umarov (to Veles Moscow)
56	MF	RUS	Kirill Khvastukhin
66	MF	POR	João Lameira (on loan to (Romania) Oțelul Galați)
71	MF	RUS	Alan Gioyev (to Veles Moscow)
80	DF	RUS	Mikhail Rybalko (to Veles Moscow)
85	GK	RUS	Nikita Zheymo (to Veles Moscow)
99	FW	RUS	Makhach Abdulkhamidov (to Dynamo Stavropol)

=== CSKA Moscow ===
In: Note: Flags indicate national team as defined under FIFA eligibility rules; some limited exceptions apply. Players may hold more than one non-FIFA nationality.

No.	Pos.	Nation	Player
11	FW	RUS	Tamerlan Musayev (from Baltika Kaliningrad)
19	MF	ALG	Sid Ahmed Aissaoui (from (Algeria) USM Alger)
53	FW	RUS	Ruslan Slavin (from own academy)
55	FW	RUS	Rostislav Polyakov (from own academy)
57	DF	RUS	German Utkin (from own academy)
63	MF	RUS	Kirill Dudarin (from own academy)
69	MF	RUS	Yaroslav Svanson (from own academy)
76	MF	RUS	Nikita Savin (from own academy)
84	MF	RUS	Aleksandr Vakulich (from own academy)
92	DF	RUS	Aleksa Stanisavlevich (from own academy)
96	DF	IRI	Amirhossein Reyvandi (on loan from (Iran) KIA Tehran)
97	MF	RUS	Maksim Zhukov (from own academy)
—	FW	RUS	Yaroslav Dol (end of loan to Dynamo Bryansk)

Out: Note: Flags indicate national team as defined under FIFA eligibility rules; some limited exceptions apply. Players may hold more than one non-FIFA nationality.

No.	Pos.	Nation	Player
20	MF	RUS	Konstantin Kuchayev (to Pari Nizhny Novgorod)
58	MF	RUS	Makar Pestov (on loan to Akron Tolyatti)
71	MF	RUS	Dmitry Kalayda (to Pari Nizhny Novgorod)
72	MF	RUS	Nikita Yermakov (on loan to Pari Nizhny Novgorod)
80	MF	RUS	Yaroslav Arbuzov (to Baltika Kaliningrad)
81	FW	RUS	Mikhail Gaynov (to Kuban Krasnodar)
82	FW	RUS	Luka Zgursky (to (Uzbekistan) Andijon)
83	DF	RUS	Denis Pershin (to Arsenal Tula)
—	MF	ISL	Arnór Sigurðsson (to (England) Blackburn Rovers, previously on loan)

=== Dynamo Moscow ===
In: Note: Flags indicate national team as defined under FIFA eligibility rules; some limited exceptions apply. Players may hold more than one non-FIFA nationality.

No.	Pos.	Nation	Player
43	MF	RUS	Pavel Gulin (from own academy)
44	MF	RUS	Leonid Kononov (from own academy)
47	GK	BLR	Andrey Kudravets (end of loan to (Belarus) BATE Borisov)
48	DF	RUS	Daniil Zavarzin (from own academy)
49	DF	RUS	Aleksandr Lubnin (from own academy)
62	DF	RUS	Konstantin Tron (from own academy)
65	DF	RUS	Vladimir Ivanov (from own academy)
66	MF	RUS	Andrey Demushkin (from own academy)
71	MF	RUS	Artyom Zmeyev (from own academy)
72	MF	RUS	Abdulla Ashurov (from own academy)
73	FW	RUS	Ramazan Iskanderov (from own academy)
78	DF	RUS	Danil Avramenko (from own academy)
84	DF	RUS	Yegor Burkhin (from own academy)
90	MF	RUS	Arseny Abdulkhalikov (from own academy)
99	FW	RUS	Maksim Yurin (from own academy)

Out: Note: Flags indicate national team as defined under FIFA eligibility rules; some limited exceptions apply. Players may hold more than one non-FIFA nationality.

No.	Pos.	Nation	Player
11	FW	RUS	Daniil Lesovoy (on loan to (Israel) Maccabi Haifa)
16	GK	RUS	Ivan Budachyov (on loan to Chernomorets Novorossiysk)
21	MF	RUS	Ivan Zazvonkin (on loan to Chernomorets Novorossiysk)
22	MF	RUS	Igor Shkolik (to (Belarus) Dinamo Minsk)
29	GK	RUS	Stepan Dyogtev (to Zenit Penza)
36	GK	RUS	Gleb Kosteley (to Baltika Kaliningrad)
37	FW	RUS	Dmitry Malygin
72	MF	RUS	Andrey Mazurin (to Yenisey Krasnoyarsk)
81	MF	RUS	Maksim Aleksandrov (to Kosmos Dolgoprudny)
83	MF	RUS	Rodion Podguzov
87	FW	RUS	Ruslan Kukushbayev
99	FW	RUS	Mikhail Kozin (to Khimki)
—	MF	RUS	Georgy Sulakvelidze (to Dynamo-2 Moscow, previously on loan to (Georgia (country)) Samgurali Tsqaltubo)

=== Fakel Voronezh ===
In: Note: Flags indicate national team as defined under FIFA eligibility rules; some limited exceptions apply. Players may hold more than one non-FIFA nationality.

No.	Pos.	Nation	Player
7	MF	RUS	Roman Akbashev (from Rostov)
22	DF	RUS	Igor Yurganov (from Sochi)
72	DF	FRA	Rayan Senhadji (from (Bulgaria) Krumovgrad)
77	MF	RUS	Luka Bagateliya (from Dynamo Stavropol)

Out: Note: Flags indicate national team as defined under FIFA eligibility rules; some limited exceptions apply. Players may hold more than one non-FIFA nationality.

No.	Pos.	Nation	Player
7	FW	RUS	Aleksandr Dolgov (to (Armenia) Urartu)
17	FW	CRO	Antonio Jakoliš (to (Kazakhstan) Turan)
30	DF	RUS	Fyodor Kudryashov (retired)
56	FW	RUS	Matvey Ivakhnov (on loan to Sokol Saratov)
—	MF	RUS	Denis Shepilov

=== Krasnodar ===
In: Note: Flags indicate national team as defined under FIFA eligibility rules; some limited exceptions apply. Players may hold more than one non-FIFA nationality.

No.	Pos.	Nation	Player
5	MF	COL	Kevin Castaño (from (Mexico) Cruz Azul)
7	FW	BRA	Victor Sá (from (Brazil) Botafogo)
26	MF	RUS	Dmitri Kratkov
27	MF	RUS	Mikhail Umnikov (from own academy)
30	GK	RUS	Valentin Grishin
32	GK	RUS	Ignat Terekhovsky (from own academy)
41	DF	RUS	Mikhail Sukhoruchenko (end of loan to Alania Vladikavkaz)
47	MF	RUS	Stanislav Oleynik (from own academy)
49	MF	RUS	Yegor Gurenko (from own academy)
51	FW	RUS	Klim Zvonaryov (from own academy)
52	FW	RUS	Vitaly Khabarov (from own academy)
59	DF	RUS	Artyom Khmarin (from own academy)
61	FW	RUS	Maksim Bogdanets (from own academy)
62	FW	RUS	Yevgeny Kovalevsky (from own academy)
63	MF	RUS	Mikhail Zakharov (from own academy)
66	MF	RUS	Kirill Kistenyov (from own academy)
68	FW	RUS	Artur Avagumyan (from own academy)
70	DF	RUS	Kirill Peredery (from own academy)
76	FW	RUS	Matvey Lushenkov (from own academy)
78	DF	ARM	Stepan Gigolyan (from own academy)
80	DF	RUS	Aleksandr Mosin (from own academy)
85	MF	RUS	Ivan Pugachevsky (from own academy)
92	FW	RUS	Arseny Popushoy (from own academy)
93	FW	RUS	Sergey Dedyayev (from own academy)
95	DF	RUS	Kirill Larionov (from own academy)

Out: Note: Flags indicate national team as defined under FIFA eligibility rules; some limited exceptions apply. Players may hold more than one non-FIFA nationality.

No.	Pos.	Nation	Player
7	MF	RUS	Ilzat Akhmetov (to Zenit St. Petersburg)
27	FW	RUS	Artyom Arutyunov (to Arsenal Tula)
37	GK	RUS	Aleksey Ploshchadny (to (Armenia) Van)
42	DF	RUS	Danila Gayvoronsky (on loan to Chernomorets Novorossiysk)
43	DF	RUS	Dmitri Ivanov (to KAMAZ Naberezhnye Chelny)
47	FW	RUS	Atsamaz Revazov (to Kuban-Holding Pavlovskaya)
50	MF	RUS	Grigory Lovtsov
51	GK	RUS	Vyacheslav Shatayev (to Ural-2 Yekaterinburg)
65	FW	RUS	Emil Kishiyev
66	DF	ARM	Ruslan Babayan (to Kuban-Holding Pavlovskaya)
68	FW	RUS	Nikita Kotylevsky
69	FW	RUS	Aleksandr Yegurnev (on loan to Khimik Dzerzhinsk)
71	MF	RUS	Dmitry Paderin (on loan to Ural-2 Yekaterinburg)
76	FW	ARM	Robert Potinyan (to Kompozit Pavlovsky Posad)
78	DF	RUS	Daniil Melnikov (to Arsenal Tula)
83	FW	RUS	Dmitry Kanayev (to Forte Taganrog)
91	DF	RUS	Stepan Komar (to Metallurg Lipetsk)
92	FW	RUS	Stepan Laskin (to Dynamo-2 Moscow)
95	FW	RUS	Vladislav Dys (to Salyut Belgorod)
99	MF	RUS	Sergei Sharov (to Amkar Perm)
—	MF	TJK	Alidzhoni Ayni (on loan to (Georgia (country)) Samgurali Tsqaltubo, previously on loan to (Tajikistan) Istiklol)
—	FW	RUS	Rustam Khalnazarov (on loan to (Georgia (country)) Telavi, previously on loan to Arsenal Tula)

=== Krylia Sovetov Samara ===
In: Note: Flags indicate national team as defined under FIFA eligibility rules; some limited exceptions apply. Players may hold more than one non-FIFA nationality.

No.	Pos.	Nation	Player
14	FW	RUS	Nikita Saltykov (on loan from Lokomotiv Moscow, previously to Lokomotiv)
25	DF	BLR	Kiryl Pyachenin (from Orenburg)
32	FW	ARG	Franco Orozco (on loan from (Argentina) Lanús)
53	DF	RUS	Yaroslav Demchenko (from own U19)
61	GK	RUS	Danil Beltyukov (end of loan to Dynamo Vladivostok)
65	DF	RUS	Ilya Gribakin (end of loan to Chertanovo Moscow)
66	FW	RUS	Yegor Pankov (end of loan to Chertanovo Moscow)
92	FW	RUS	Pavel Popov (end of loan to Chertanovo Moscow)

Out: Note: Flags indicate national team as defined under FIFA eligibility rules; some limited exceptions apply. Players may hold more than one non-FIFA nationality.

No.	Pos.	Nation	Player
44	DF	CRO	Mateo Barać (to (Kazakhstan) Aktobe)
—	GK	RUS	Nikita Yavorsky (on loan to Metallurg Lipetsk, previously on loan to Tekstilshchik Ivanovo)
—	MF	RUS	Dmitri Velikorodny (to Metallurg Lipetsk, previously on loan to Chelyabinsk)
—	FW	RUS	Nikita Khlusov (to Zvezda St. Petersburg, previously on loan to (Belarus) Dnepr Mogilev)

=== Lokomotiv Moscow ===
In: Note: Flags indicate national team as defined under FIFA eligibility rules; some limited exceptions apply. Players may hold more than one non-FIFA nationality.

No.	Pos.	Nation	Player
5	DF	FRA	Gerzino Nyamsi (from (France) Strasbourg)
56	GK	RUS	Bogdan Sheyko (from own academy)
58	GK	RUS	Denis Uralyov
63	FW	RUS	Aleksandr Morozov (from own U17)
72	DF	RUS	Zaur Kardov (from own academy)
73	MF	RUS	Yegor Stepanov (from own academy)
82	DF	RUS	Daniil Lazarev (from own academy)
95	MF	RUS	Arseny Gerdt (from own academy)
97	FW	BIH	Said Hamulić (on loan from (France) Toulouse)
99	FW	RUS	Timur Suleymanov (from Pari Nizhny Novgorod, previously on loan)

Out: Note: Flags indicate national team as defined under FIFA eligibility rules; some limited exceptions apply. Players may hold more than one non-FIFA nationality.

No.	Pos.	Nation	Player
5	MF	RUS	Konstantin Maradishvili (on loan to Pari Nizhny Novgorod)
20	DF	RUS	Ivan Kuzmichyov (on loan to Torpedo Moscow)
54	GK	RUS	Nikita Matyunin (to Tver)
69	MF	RUS	Daniil Kulikov (to Rodina Moscow)
79	MF	ARM	Vadim Harutyunyan
81	FW	RUS	Kirill Nikishin (to Tyumen)
81	FW	RUS	Nikita Khlynov (to Tver)
91	FW	RUS	Nikita Chugunov (to Tver)
94	MF	RUS	Dmitri Rybchinsky (to Baltika Kaliningrad)
—	DF	ARG	Germán Conti (to (Argentina) Racing, previously on loan to (Argentina) Colón)
—	FW	BRA	Pedrinho (on loan to (Brazil) Santos, previously on loan to (Brazil) América Mineiro)
—	FW	RUS	Denis Pushkaryov (on loan to Chelyabinsk, previously on loan to Volgar Astrakhan)
—	FW	RUS	Nikita Saltykov (on loan to Krylia Sovetov Samara, previously from Krylia Sovetov)

=== Orenburg ===
In: Note: Flags indicate national team as defined under FIFA eligibility rules; some limited exceptions apply. Players may hold more than one non-FIFA nationality.

No.	Pos.	Nation	Player
16	FW	CHI	Jordhy Thompson (on loan from (Chile) Colo-Colo)
47	FW	BLR	Timofey Martynov (from (Belarus) Minsk)
66	MF	IRI	Mohammad Ghorbani (from (Iran) Sepahan)
87	DF	RUS	Danila Prokhin (on loan from Rostov)

Out: Note: Flags indicate national team as defined under FIFA eligibility rules; some limited exceptions apply. Players may hold more than one non-FIFA nationality.

No.	Pos.	Nation	Player
17	MF	BLR	Yury Kavalyow (to Baltika Kaliningrad)
25	DF	BLR	Kiryl Pyachenin (to Krylia Sovetov Samara)
33	GK	RUS	Oleg Shamsiyev
36	MF	RUS	Valery Khachin
41	GK	RUS	Rodion Rodionov
43	MF	RUS	Nikita Pozhidayev
47	DF	RUS	Maksim Syshchenko
48	FW	RUS	Nikita Shershov (to Akron Tolyatti)
51	DF	RUS	Danil Khoroshkov (to Uralets-TS Nizhny Tagil)
52	MF	RUS	Ruslan Laysanov
55	MF	BLR	Kirill Kaplenko (to Baltika Kaliningrad)
59	GK	RUS	Platon Zakharchuk
62	DF	RUS	Viktor Vtorov
64	FW	RUS	Vladimir Akhvatov
65	FW	RUS	Ivan Gulko (to Irtysh Omsk)
78	MF	RUS	Vladimir Badyukevich
79	MF	RUS	Aleksandr Loparyov
92	MF	RUS	Denis Fedenko
93	MF	RUS	Vladislav Borkin
96	DF	RUS	Roman Gavrilenko
97	MF	RUS	Ilya Yerokhin
—	DF	BLR	Aleksandr Pavlovets (on loan to (Cyprus) Karmiotissa, previously on loan to (Greece) Lamia)
—	MF	RUS	Danil Kapustyansky (on loan to Ufa, previously on loan to Yenisey Krasnoyarsk)

=== Pari Nizhny Novgorod ===
In: Note: Flags indicate national team as defined under FIFA eligibility rules; some limited exceptions apply. Players may hold more than one non-FIFA nationality.

No.	Pos.	Nation	Player
1	GK	RUS	Vadim Lukyanov (from Forte Taganrog)
5	MF	RUS	Konstantin Maradishvili (on loan from Lokomotiv Moscow)
6	DF	RUS	Danila Vedernikov (end of loan to Murom)
18	MF	RUS	Konstantin Kuchayev (from CSKA Moscow)
19	MF	RUS	Nikita Yermakov (on loan from CSKA Moscow)
21	FW	RUS	Dmitry Kalayda (from CSKA Moscow)
42	DF	RUS	Artyom Kuzin (from Chertanovo Moscow U19)
57	MF	RUS	Roman Chibanov (from Rubin Kazan U19)
67	DF	RUS	Yegor Skvortsov (from Torpedo Vladimir)
71	DF	RUS	Vladislav Medvikus (from own academy)
80	MF	RUS	Valeri Tsarukyan (from Alania Vladikavkaz)
87	MF	RUS	Kirill Bozhenov (end of loan to Khimik Dzerzhinsk)
88	DF	RUS	Kirill Glushchenkov (from (Belarus) Torpedo-BelAZ Zhodino)

Out: Note: Flags indicate national team as defined under FIFA eligibility rules; some limited exceptions apply. Players may hold more than one non-FIFA nationality.

No.	Pos.	Nation	Player
6	DF	UZB	Ibrokhimkhalil Yuldoshev (on loan to (Kazakhstan) Kairat)
7	FW	ARM	Edgar Sevikyan (to (Hungary) Ferencváros)
17	FW	UZB	Ruslanbek Jiyanov (on loan to (Uzbekistan) Navbahor Namangan)
21	MF	NGR	Ededem Essien (to (Kazakhstan) Tobol)
51	GK	RUS	Vitali Botnar (to Torpedo Moscow)
65	DF	RUS	Nikolai Tolstopyatov (end of loan from Spartak Moscow)
—	DF	RUS	Daniil Penchikov (to Pari NN-2 Nizhny Novgorod, previously on loan to (Kazakhstan) Aktobe)
—	MF	RUS	Yegor Gaganin (to Volna Nizhny Novgorod Oblast, previously on loan to Khimik Dzerzhinsk)
—	MF	RUS	Yegor Sinitsyn (to Pari NN-2 Nizhny Novgorod, previously on loan to Khimik Dzerzhinsk)
—	FW	RUS	Vyacheslav Krotov (to Volgar Astrakhan, previously on loan to Alania Vladikavkaz)
—	FW	RUS	Timur Suleymanov (to Lokomotiv Moscow, previously on loan)
—	FW	RUS	Dmitri Yugaldin (to Amkar Perm, previously on loan to Sokol Saratov)

=== Rostov ===
In: Note: Flags indicate national team as defined under FIFA eligibility rules; some limited exceptions apply. Players may hold more than one non-FIFA nationality.

No.	Pos.	Nation	Player
7	FW	BRA	Ronaldo (from (Bulgaria) Levski Sofia)
3	DF	CIV	Oumar Sako (on loan from (Bulgaria) Arda Kardzhali)
34	DF	EGY	Eyad El Askalany (from (Egypt) Ismaily)
53	FW	RUS	Kirill Moiseyev
75	FW	RUS	Danil Khromov
86	MF	RUS	Nikita Kashtan (end of loan to SKA Rostov-on-Don)
91	FW	RUS	Anton Shamonin (from own U19)
—	DF	RUS	Aleksandr Mukhin (end of loan to Volgar Astrakhan)

Out: Note: Flags indicate national team as defined under FIFA eligibility rules; some limited exceptions apply. Players may hold more than one non-FIFA nationality.

No.	Pos.	Nation	Player
7	MF	RUS	Roman Akbashev (to Fakel Voronezh)
11	FW	RUS	Aleksei Ionov (to Ural Yekaterinburg)
18	DF	RUS	Danila Prokhin (on loan to Orenburg)
23	FW	RUS	Roman Tugarev (on loan to Torpedo Moscow)
46	GK	RUS	Aleksandr Dyachkov (on loan to Mashuk-KMV Pyatigorsk, previously on loan to Biolog-Novokubansk)
48	GK	RUS	Sergey Mokrousov (to Rostov-2)
49	DF	RUS	Gleb Glazyrin (to Rostov-2)
56	MF	RUS	Yaroslav Kuzmin
57	MF	RUS	Ilya Zhbanov (to Rostov-2)
63	MF	RUS	Abdullo Dzhebov (to Spartak-2 Moscow)
65	DF	RUS	Nikita Kolyuchkin (to Rostov-2)
74	MF	RUS	Alibeg Akhmedov
82	DF	RUS	Ivan Kuznetsov (to Rostov-2)
94	MF	RUS	Marat Kovalkov (to Rostov-2)
95	MF	RUS	Ivan Polumysko (to Rostov-2)
98	DF	RUS	Kirill Ivanov
—	GK	RUS	Maksim Rudakov (to Sochi, previously on loan to (Finland) Honka)
—	DF	RUS	Konstantin Kovalyov (to Torpedo Moscow, previously on loan to Leon Saturn Ramenskoye)
—	MF	RUS	Maksim Martyanov (to Rostov-2, previously on loan to Dynamo St. Petersburg)

=== Rubin Kazan ===
In: Note: Flags indicate national team as defined under FIFA eligibility rules; some limited exceptions apply. Players may hold more than one non-FIFA nationality.

No.	Pos.	Nation	Player
8	MF	SRB	Bogdan Jočić (from (Serbia) Voždovac)
10	MF	SUI	Darko Jevtić (return from injury)
11	FW	IRI	Kasra Taheri (from (Iran) Sepahan)
77	FW	SRB	Luka Bijelović (on loan from (Serbia) Spartak Subotica)
99	FW	AUT	Dardan Shabanhaxhaj (from (Slovenia) Mura)
—	FW	CRO	Marko Čavara (end of loan to SKA-Khabarovsk])

Out: Note: Flags indicate national team as defined under FIFA eligibility rules; some limited exceptions apply. Players may hold more than one non-FIFA nationality.

No.	Pos.	Nation	Player
8	FW	BLR	Vitaly Lisakovich (on loan to Baltika Kaliningrad)
11	FW	RUS	Daniil Kuznetsov (on loan to Rodina Moscow)
20	FW	GHA	Joel Fameyeh (on loan to Baltika Kaliningrad)
24	FW	SRB	Nikola Čumić (injury)
25	MF	RUS	Igor Konovalov (to SKA-Khabarovsk)
38	MF	RUS	Leon Musayev (on loan to Kuban Krasnodar)
80	DF	RUS	Yegor Sorokin (to (Kazakhstan) Yelimay)
99	GK	RUS	Artyom Ismagilov (on loan to Amkar Perm)
—	DF	RUS	Ivan Savitsky (to Baltika-BFU Kaliningrad, previously on loan to Rodina-2 Moscow)

=== Sochi ===
In: Note: Flags indicate national team as defined under FIFA eligibility rules; some limited exceptions apply. Players may hold more than one non-FIFA nationality.

No.	Pos.	Nation	Player
1	GK	RUS	Maksim Rudakov (from Rostov)
2	DF	RUS	Dmitri Chistyakov (on loan from Zenit St. Petersburg)
10	FW	VEN	Sergio Córdova (on loan from (Turkey) Alanyaspor)
19	MF	RUS	Aleksei Sutormin (on loan from Zenit St. Petersburg)
21	MF	CHI	Ignacio Saavedra (from (Chile) Universidad Católica)
23	FW	VEN	Saúl Guarirapa (on loan from (Venezuela) Caracas)
25	DF	MAR	Yahia Attiyat Allah (from (Morocco) Wydad)
33	DF	BRA	Marcelo Alves (from (Brazil) Madureira, previously on loan)
42	DF	RUS	Astemir Khezhev (from own academy)
77	MF	AUT	Aleksandar Jukić (from Austria Wien)

Out: Note: Flags indicate national team as defined under FIFA eligibility rules; some limited exceptions apply. Players may hold more than one non-FIFA nationality.

No.	Pos.	Nation	Player
8	MF	RUS	Amir Batyrev (on loan to Sokol Saratov)
9	FW	RUS	Georgi Melkadze (to (Georgia (country)) Kolkheti-1913 Poti)
10	FW	RUS	Ivan Ignatyev (to (Serbia) Železničar Pančevo)
11	FW	MNE	Luka Đorđević (to (Saudi Arabia) Abha)
11	MF	ARM	Hovhannes Harutyunyan (on loan to (Armenia) Pyunik, previously from (Armenia) Pyunik)
13	GK	RUS	Nikita Goylo (injury, on loan from Zenit St. Petersburg)
15	DF	NGR	Solomon Agbalaka (on loan to (Georgia (country)) Iberia 1999, previously from (Nigeria) Broad City, previously on loan from (Nigeria) Broad City)
16	MF	ECU	Christian Noboa (to (Ecuador) Emelec)
20	DF	RUS	Igor Yurganov (to Fakel Voronezh)
26	DF	RUS	Artyom Meshchaninov (to Rodina Moscow)
44	DF	RUS	David Gigolayev
45	DF	SRB	Ivan Miladinović (to (Kazakhstan) Tobol)
50	MF	RUS	Daniil Chernov
51	GK	RUS	Timofey Kashintsev (on loan to Tekstilshchik Ivanovo)
53	MF	RUS	Aleksandr Deryugin (on loan to Dynamo Vologda)
63	MF	RUS	Vladislav Shaparev
66	MF	RUS	Aleksandr Metsiyev (to Sochi-2)
70	MF	RUS	Lev Alim
74	MF	RUS	Aleksey Filimonov (on loan to Kompozit Pavlovsky Posad)
78	DF	RUS	Platon Platonov
86	DF	RUS	Daniil Plyushchenko
87	DF	RUS	Artur Koshman
88	GK	RUS	Andrey Belozertsev
99	FW	ECU	Alejandro Cabeza (to (Ecuador) 9 de Octubre)
—	DF	RUS	Artur Kuskov (on loan to Mashuk-KMV Pyatigorsk, previously on loan to Veles Moscow)
—	FW	RUS	Daniil Pavlov (to Avangard Kursk, previously on loan to Arsenal Tula)

=== Spartak Moscow ===
In: Note: Flags indicate national team as defined under FIFA eligibility rules; some limited exceptions apply. Players may hold more than one non-FIFA nationality.

No.	Pos.	Nation	Player
9	FW	CRC	Manfred Ugalde (from (Netherlands) Twente)
20	DF	POR	Tomás Tavares (back from long-term injury)
33	DF	RUS	Ivan Goryainov (from Zvezda St. Petersburg)
34	FW	RUS	Georgy Rykov (from own academy)
49	GK	RUS	Vladislav Dzhurayev (from own academy)
51	DF	RUS	Maksim Karpov (from Zvezda St. Petersburg)
53	MF	RUS	Bogdan Ruppel (from own academy)
55	MF	RUS	Nikita Posmashny (from Zvezda St. Petersburg)
56	MF	RUS	Nikita Massalyga (from own academy)
64	MF	RUS	Daniil Stolyarov (from Zvezda St. Petersburg)
65	FW	RUS	Dmitry Shopin (from own academy)
67	MF	RUS	Ivan Ivanov (from Chertanovo Moscow U19)
73	FW	RUS	Daniil Bortsov (from own academy)
74	DF	RUS	Yegor Guziyev (from Chertanovo Moscow)
76	DF	RUS	Yegor Ananyev (from own academy)
78	MF	RUS	Artyom Ponomarchuk (from own academy)
79	FW	RUS	Vladislav Sokolov (from own academy)
80	DF	RUS	Yury Koledin (from Zvezda St. Petersburg)
81	DF	RUS	Valery Ozerov (from own academy)
84	MF	RUS	Daniil Plotnikov (from own academy)
87	MF	RUS	Daniil Zorin (end of loan to (Belarus) Dinamo Minsk)
92	MF	RUS	Nikolay Kobylin (from own academy)

Out: Note: Flags indicate national team as defined under FIFA eligibility rules; some limited exceptions apply. Players may hold more than one non-FIFA nationality.

No.	Pos.	Nation	Player
13	MF	RUS	Maksim Laykin (on loan to Arsenal Tula)
40	FW	RUS	Timur Kim (to Ryazan)
43	MF	RUS	Nikita Kononenko
45	GK	RUS	Aleksandr Ignatyev
46	DF	RUS	Mikhail Kondratyev (to Sochi U19)
53	GK	RUS	Anton Migunov
70	FW	RUS	Pavel Melyoshin (on loan to (Belarus) Dinamo Minsk)
73	DF	RUS	Aleksandr Sergin
78	MF	RUS	Konstantin Mishin (to Leon Saturn Ramenskoye)
79	DF	RUS	Timofey Danilov (to Rodina-2 Moscow)
81	MF	RUS	Artemy Gunko (to Kosmos Dolgoprudny)
—	DF	RUS	Yaroslav Krashevsky (on loan to Rotor Volgograd, previously on loan to Yenisey Krasnoyarsk)
—	DF	RUS	Nikolai Tolstopyatov (on loan to Sokol Saratov, previously on loan to Pari Nizhny Novgorod)
—	DF	RUS	Danil Trukhanov (to Spartak-2 Moscow, previously on loan to Kosmos Dolgoprudny)
—	MF	RUS	Konstantin Shiltsov (on loan to Neftekhimik Nizhnekamsk, previously on loan to Rodina Moscow)

=== Ural Yekaterinburg ===
In: Note: Flags indicate national team as defined under FIFA eligibility rules; some limited exceptions apply. Players may hold more than one non-FIFA nationality.

No.	Pos.	Nation	Player
3	MF	BLR	Valery Bocherov (from (Belarus) BATE Borisov)
11	FW	RUS	Aleksei Ionov (from Rostov)
80	FW	BLR	Artem Kontsevoy (from (Belarus) BATE Borisov)

Out: Note: Flags indicate national team as defined under FIFA eligibility rules; some limited exceptions apply. Players may hold more than one non-FIFA nationality.

No.	Pos.	Nation	Player
7	MF	RUS	Aleksandr Yushin (to Rodina Moscow)
86	GK	RUS	Ivan Kuznetsov
98	GK	RUS	Nikita Alekseyev (to Ural-2 Yekaterinburg)
—	MF	GEO	Luka Tsulukidze (released, previously on loan to (Georgia (country)) Dinamo Tbilisi)

=== Zenit Saint Petersburg ===
In: Note: Flags indicate national team as defined under FIFA eligibility rules; some limited exceptions apply. Players may hold more than one non-FIFA nationality.

No.	Pos.	Nation	Player
9	FW	BRA	Artur (from (Brazil) Palmeiras)
24	FW	BRA	Pedro (from (Brazil) Corinthians, in effect in February 2024)
27	DF	BRA	Nino (from (Brazil) Fluminense)
39	FW	RUS	Maksim Khokhlov (from own academy)
40	MF	RUS	Georgy Kasheyev (from own academy)
42	DF	RUS	Pyotr Timofeyev (from own academy)
43	DF	RUS	Aleksandr Tarasov (from own academy)
46	DF	RUS	Kirill Obonin (from own academy)
50	MF	RUS	Danil Lukiyan (from own academy)
63	MF	RUS	Stanislav Karelin (from own academy)
75	FW	RUS	Vladimir Zharikov (from own academy)
77	MF	RUS	Ilzat Akhmetov (from Krasnodar)
90	MF	RUS	Ilya Gushchin (from own academy)
94	DF	RUS	Stepan Vavilov (from own academy)
95	MF	RUS	Ivan Ananyev (from own academy)

Out: Note: Flags indicate national team as defined under FIFA eligibility rules; some limited exceptions apply. Players may hold more than one non-FIFA nationality.

No.	Pos.	Nation	Player
2	DF	RUS	Dmitri Chistyakov (on loan to Sochi)
19	MF	RUS	Aleksei Sutormin (on loan to Sochi)
35	MF	RUS	Vladislav Saus (on loan to Shinnik Yaroslavl)
36	DF	RUS	Dmitry Bykov
37	MF	BRA	Du Queiroz (on loan to Grêmio)
42	MF	RUS	Andrey Orlov (to Dynamo St. Petersburg)
43	DF	RUS	Artyom Kasimov (on loan to Dynamo Makhachkala)
46	DF	BLR	Ilya Moskalenchik (on loan to Tyumen)
48	DF	RUS	Maksim Sharov
50	DF	RUS	Arseny Abzalilov (to Astrakhan)
59	DF	RUS	Yevgeny Tonevitsky (to Dynamo Vologda)
61	GK	RUS	Bogdan Moskvichyov (on loan to Chayka Peschanokopskoye)
66	MF	BLR	Aleksey Butarevich (to (Belarus) Torpedo-BelAZ Zhodino)
68	FW	RUS	Dmitry Samartsev (to Orenburg-2)
69	FW	RUS	Ilya Rodionov (on loan to Chernomorets Novorossiysk)
77	DF	BRA	Robert Renan (on loan to (Brazil) Internacional)
84	FW	RUS	Nikita Tereshchuk (to Baltika Kaliningrad)
85	GK	RUS	Sergey Butyrya (to Shinnik Yaroslavl)
90	DF	RUS	Maksim Polyakov (to Shinnik Yaroslavl)
94	MF	RUS	Danila Kozlov (to Baltika Kaliningrad)
95	GK	RUS	Georgy Korolyov (on loan to Forte Taganrog)
