= Balakhnin =

Balakhnin (Russian: Балахнин) is a Russian masculine surname, its feminine counterpart is Balakhnina. It may refer to

- Aleksandr Balakhnin (born 1955), Soviet and Russian footballer and coach
- Sergei Balakhnin (born 1959), Soviet and Russian footballer and coach, brother of Aleksandr
