= Ivan Kuznetsov =

Ivan Kuznetsov may refer to:

- Ivan Kuznetsov (architect) (1867–1942), Russian architect
- Ivan Kuznetsov (footballer) (born 2004), Russian footballer
- Ivan Kuznetsov (sledge hockey) (born 1986), Russian sledge hockey player
- Ivan Kuznetsov (skier) (born 1996), Russian alpine skier
- Ivan Kuznetsov (actor) (1909–1976), Russian actor

== See also ==
- Ivan Beerkus (born Ivan Artemovich Kuznetsov, 1994), Russian rooftopper and blogger
