= Aleksandr Balakhnin =

Russian footballer

Personal information
- Full name: Aleksandr Nikolayevich Balakhnin
- Date of birth: April 1, 1955 (age 71)
- Place of birth: Belaya Kalitva, Russian SFSR
- Height: 1.81 m (5 ft 11 1/2 in)
- Position: Goalkeeper

Senior career*
Years	Team	Apps	(Gls)
1975–1976	FC Torpedo Taganrog	37	(0)
1977	FC Terek Grozny	25	(0)
1978	FC Torpedo Moscow	0	(0)
1978–1979	FC Terek Grozny	56	(0)
1980–1984	FC Kuban Krasnodar	120	(0)
1985	FC SKA Rostov-on-Don	13	(0)
1986	FC Rostselmash Rostov-on-Don	20	(0)
1987	FC Kuban Krasnodar	26	(0)
1988–1990	FC Rostselmash Rostov-on-Don	43	(0)
1992	FC APK Azov	22	(0)
1994	FC Lada Togliatti	4	(0)

Managerial career
- 1994: FC Lada Togliatti (assistant)
- 1996: FC Lokomotiv Nizhny Novgorod (assistant)
- 1997–1998: FC Torpedo Arzamas (assistant)
- 2003–2005: FC Rostov (reserves assistant)
- 2005–2007: FC Rostov (GK coach)
- 2009: FC Vityaz Podolsk (GK coach)
- 2011–2018: FC Rostov (reserves GK coach)
- * Club domestic league appearances and goals

Aleksandr Nikolayevich Balakhnin (Russian: Александр Николаевич Балахнин; born April 1, 1955) is a Russian professional football coach and a former player. He made his professional debut in the Soviet Second League in 1976 for FC Torpedo Taganrog.

His younger brother Sergei Balakhnin also played football professionally.
