= Enver Yulgushov =

Russian footballer and coach (1938–2022)

Personal information
- Full name: Enver Umyarovich Yulgushov
- Date of birth: 25 June 1938
- Place of birth: Rostov-on-Don, Russian SFSR, USSR
- Date of death: 20 April 2022 (aged 83)
- Position: Forward

Senior career*
Years	Team	Apps	(Gls)
1955	Dynamo Rostov-on-Don		
1956–1958	Rostselmash Rostov-on-Don	71	(19)
1959	SKVO Rostov-on-Don	0	(0)
1959–1962	Rostselmash Rostov-on-Don	79	(32)
1963–1964	Shakhtyor Shakhty		
1965	Energiya Novocherkassk	37	(3)

Managerial career
- 1975–1987: Rostselmash Rostov-on-Don (assistant)
- 1987–1990: Torpedo Taganrog
- 1990–1995: Rostselmash Rostov-on-Don
- 1997–1999: Volgar-Gazprom Astrakhan
- * Club domestic league appearances and goals

Enver Umyarovich Yulgushov (Russian: Энвер Умярович Юлгушов; 25 June 1938 – 20 April 2022) was a Russian professional football coach and player. He worked as a president of a coaching council of FC Rostov. He died on 20 April 2022, at the age of 83.
