= Aleksei Mironov =

Russian footballer

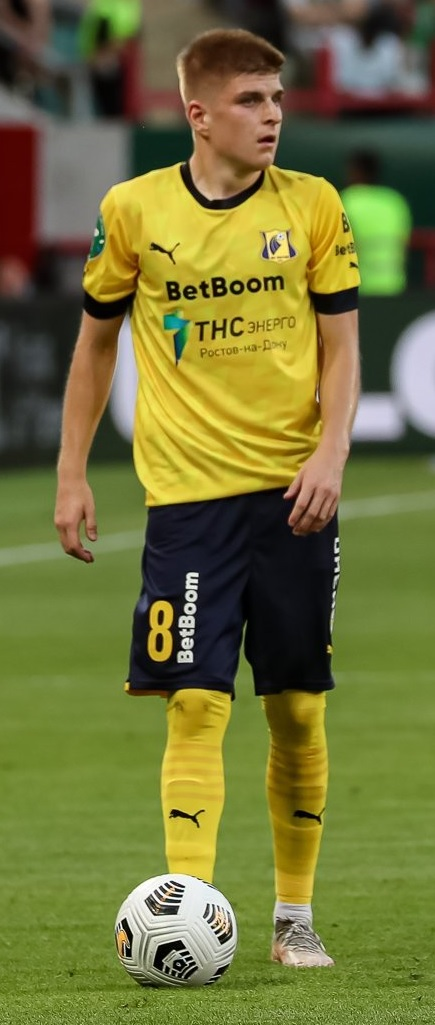
- Mironov with Rostov in 2022

Personal information
- Full name: Aleksei Vladislavovich Mironov
- Date of birth: 1 January 2000 (age 26)
- Place of birth: Moscow, Russia
- Height: 1.75 m (5 ft 9 in)
- Position: Central midfielder

Team information
- Current team: FC Rostov
- Number: 8

Senior career*
Years	Team	Apps	(Gls)
2017–2022	FC Lokomotiv Moscow	0	(0)
2018–2020	→ FC Kazanka Moscow	18	(3)
2020–2022	→ FC Orenburg (loan)	52	(10)
2022–	FC Rostov	84	(6)

International career^{‡}
2015–2016	Russia U-16	9	(1)
2016–2017	Russia U-17	16	(2)
2018	Russia U-18	2	(1)
2018	Russia U-19	3	(0)
2026–	Russia	2	(0)
- * Club domestic league appearances and goals as of 20 November 2026 ‡ National team caps and goals as of 17 November 2026

Aleksei Vladislavovich Mironov (Russian: Алексей Владиславович Миронов; born 1 January 2000) is a Russian football player who plays as a central midfielder for FC Rostov and the Russia national team.

== Club career ==
He made his debut in the Russian Football National League for FC Orenburg on 16 August 2020 in a game against FC Tekstilshchik Ivanovo.

On 17 June 2022, Mironov signed a five-year contract with FC Rostov. He made his Russian Premier League debut for Rostov on 24 July 2022 against FC Lokomotiv Moscow. On 26 June 2026, Mironov extended his contract with Rostov to 2030.

== International career ==
Mironov was first called up to the Russia national team in November 2026 for friendlies.

He made his debut on 12 November 2026 against Uzbekistan.

== Career statistics ==
=== Club ===
As of match played 20 November 2026

Appearances and goals by club, season and competition
Club	Season	League			Cup		Total	
Club	Season	Division	Apps	Goals	Apps	Goals	Apps	Goals
Kazanka Moscow (loan)	2018–19	Russian Second League	5	1	–		5	1
Kazanka Moscow (loan)	2019–20	Russian Second League	12	1	–		12	1
Kazanka Moscow (loan)	2020–21	Russian Second League	1	1	–		1	1
Kazanka Moscow (loan)	Total		18	3	–		18	3
Orenburg (loan)	2020–21	Russian First League	26	4	2	0	28	4
Orenburg (loan)	2021–22	Russian First League	26	6	2	0	28	6
Orenburg (loan)	Total		52	10	4	0	56	10
Rostov	2022–23	Russian Premier League	26	1	8	0	34	1
Rostov	2023–24	Russian Premier League	15	1	3	0	18	1
Rostov	2024–25	Russian Premier League	2	0	1	0	3	0
Rostov	2025–26	Russian Premier League	28	2	3	1	31	3
Rostov	2026–27	Russian Premier League	13	2	3	0	16	2
Rostov	Total		84	6	18	1	102	7
Career total			154	19	22	1	176	20

=== International ===
As of match played 17 November 2026

Appearances and goals by national team and year
National team	Year	Apps	Goals
Russia	2026	2	0
Total		2	0
