= Imran Aznaurov =

Russian footballer

Personal information
- Full name: Imran Ramazanovich Aznaurov
- Date of birth: 23 August 2004 (age 22)
- Place of birth: Nalchik, Russia
- Height: 1.75 m (5 ft 9 in)
- Position: Left winger

Team information
- Current team: Rostov
- Number: 73

Youth career
- –2017: Spartak Nalchik
- 2017–2022: CSKA Moscow
- 2022–: Rostov

Senior career*
Years	Team	Apps	(Gls)
2024–	Rostov	17	(0)
2024–	Rostov-2	18	(10)
2025–2026	→ Rotor Volgograd (loan)	21	(2)
- * Club domestic league appearances and goals as of 20 November 2026

Imran Ramazanovich Aznaurov (Russian: Имран Рамазанович Азнауров; born 23 August 2004) is a Russian football player who plays as a left winger for Rostov.

== Career ==
He made his debut in the Russian Premier League for Rostov on 1 March 2024 in a game against Krylia Sovetov Samara.

Aznaurov was loaned on 8 August 2025 to FC Rotor Volgograd in the Russian First League.

== Career statistics ==
As of match played 20 November 2026

Appearances and goals by club, season and competition
Club	Season	League			Cup		Other		Total	
Club	Season	Division	Apps	Goals	Apps	Goals	Apps	Goals	Apps	Goals
Rostov	2023–24	Russian Premier League	3	0	3	0	—		6	0
Rostov	2024–25	Russian Premier League	6	0	4	0	—		10	0
Rostov	2025–26	Russian Premier League	0	0	1	0	—		1	0
Rostov	2026–27	Russian Premier League	8	0	5	2	—		13	2
Rostov	Total		17	0	13	2	0	0	30	2
Rostov-2	2024	Russian Second League B	10	7	—		—		10	7
Rostov-2	2025	Russian Second League B	8	3	—		—		8	3
Rostov-2	Total		18	10	0	0	0	0	18	10
Rotor Volgograd (loan)	2025–26	Russian First League	21	2	1	0	2 (Note: Appearances in promotion play-offs)	0	24	2
Career total			56	12	14	2	2	0	72	14
