= David Semenchuk =

Russian footballer (born 2004)

Personal information
- Date of birth: 22 October 2004 (age 22)
- Height: 1.93 m (6 ft 4 in)
- Position: Centre-back

Team information
- Current team: Rostov
- Number: 22

Youth career
- –2017: CSKA Moscow
- 2017–2020: FShM Moscow
- 2020–: Rostov

Senior career*
Years	Team	Apps	(Gls)
2023–2024	Rostov	3	(0)
2024	Rostov-2	12	(1)
2024–2025	Arsenal Tula	21	(0)
2025–	Rostov	25	(0)
2025	Rostov-2	3	(0)
- * Club domestic league appearances and goals as of 20 November 2026

David Semenchuk (Russian: Дави́д Семенчу́к; born 22 October 2004) is a Russian football player who plays as a centre-back for Rostov.

== Career ==
Semenchuk made his debut for Rostov on 26 July 2023 in a Russian Cup game against Rubin Kazan. He made his Russian Premier League debut on 12 August 2023, also against Rubin.

== Career statistics ==
As of match played 20 November 2026

Appearances and goals by club, season and competition
Club	Season	League			Cup		Total	
Club	Season	Division	Apps	Goals	Apps	Goals	Apps	Goals
Rostov	2023–24	Russian Premier League	3	0	6	0	9	0
Rostov	2024–25	Russian Premier League	0	0	1	0	1	0
Rostov	Total		3	0	7	0	10	0
Rostov-2	2024	Russian Second League B	12	1	—		12	1
Arsenal Tula	2024–25	Russian First League	21	0	0	0	21	0
Rostov	2025–26	Russian Premier League	20	0	8	0	28	0
Rostov	2026–27	Russian Premier League	5	0	5	1	10	1
Rostov	Total		25	0	13	1	38	1
Rostov	Club total		26	0	20	1	46	1
Rostov-2	2025	Russian Second League B	3	0	—		3	0
Rostov-2	Club total		15	1	0	0	15	1
Career total			64	1	20	1	84	2
