= Sergei Balakhnin =

Russian footballer

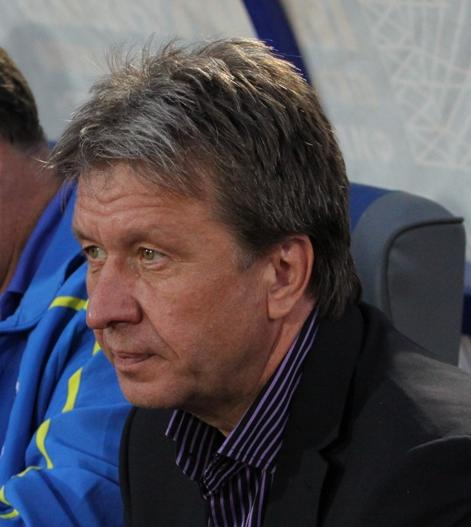

Personal information
- Full name: Sergei Nikolayevich Balakhnin
- Date of birth: 26 November 1959 (age 66)
- Place of birth: Belaya Kalitva, Rostov Oblast, Russian SSR
- Height: 1.84 m (6 ft 1/2 in)
- Positions: Midfielder; forward

Youth career
- 1978: Kalitva Belaya Kalitva

Senior career*
Years	Team	Apps	(Gls)
1979–1980	Rostselmash	27	(7)
1980	SKA Rostov-on-Don	10	(1)
1981	Kuban Krasnodar	0	(0)
1981–1990	Rostselmash	288	(52)
1990	KajHa		
1991–1992	Rostselmash	44	(6)
1992	Rostselmash-2	4	(1)
1992	KajHa		
1993	Rostselmash	7	(2)
1993	Rostselmash-2	1	(0)
1993	KajHa		
1994–1995	Rostselmash	54	(8)

Managerial career
- 1995–1997: Rostselmash (scout)
- 1998–2000: Rostselmash (assistant)
- 2001: Rostselmash
- 2001–2002: Rostselmash (assistant)
- 2002–2003: Rostov
- 2003: Rostov (assistant)
- 2003: Rostov
- 2004: Rostov (assistant)
- 2004: Rostov
- 2005: Rostov (assistant)
- 2005–2007: Rostov
- 2008–2009: Vityaz Podolsk
- 2011–2012: Rostov
- 2013–2014: Sibir Novosibirsk
- 2015–2016: Russia (assistant)
- * Club domestic league appearances and goals

Sergei Nikolayevich Balakhnin (Russian: Серге́й Николаевич Балахнин; born 26 November 1959) is a Russian professional football coach and a former player.

== Career ==
As a player, he made his debut in the Soviet Second League in 1979 for FC Rostselmash Rostov-on-Don.

His older brother Aleksandr Balakhnin also played football professionally.
