= Rostov Arena =

Association football stadium in Rostov-on-Don, Russia

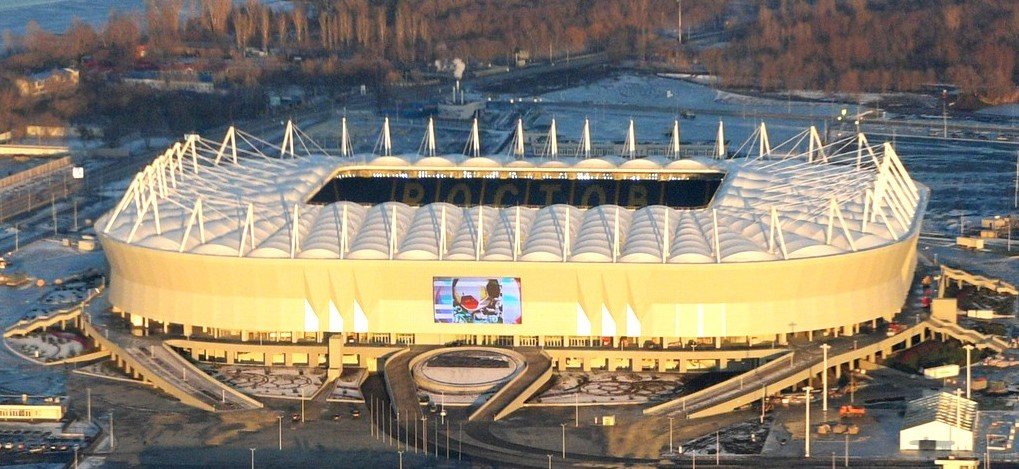
- UEFA
- Interactive map of Rostov Arena
- Full name: Rostov Arena
- Location: Ulitsa Levoberezhnaya 2B, Rostov-on-Don, Russia
- Coordinates: 47°12′34″N 39°44′16″E
- Capacity: 45,000 (Official); 43,472 (2018 FIFA World Cup)
- Surface: Grass
- Field size: 105 x 68 m

Construction
- Groundbreaking: 2014
- Built: 2014–2018
- Cost: rubles 19.84 billion (2013); Euro 270 million
- Architect: Populous

Tenants
- FC Rostov (2018–present); Russia national football team (selected matches)

Rostov Arena (Russian: «Ростов Арена») is an association football stadium in Rostov-on-Don, Russia. It was one of the venues for the 2018 FIFA World Cup. It also hosts FC Rostov of the Russian Premier League, replacing Olimp – 2. It has a capacity of 45,000 spectators.

== History ==
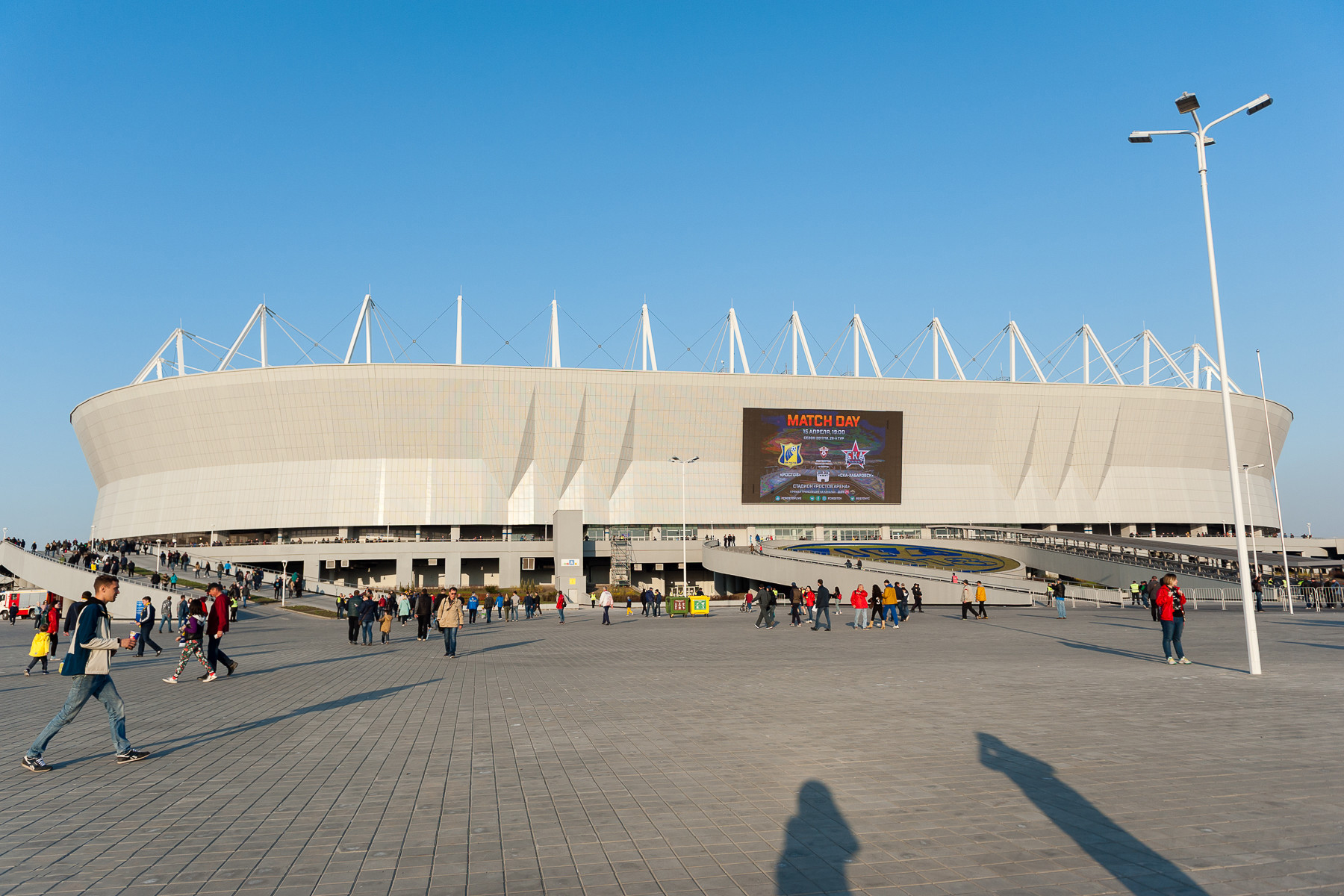
Rostov Arena

In June 2013, during the groundbreaking for the stadium, five shells from WWII were found, almost perfectly preserved.

In August 2013, work began on the sandy alluvium foundation for the stadium. Work on the foundation was completed in May 2014. Construction commenced on the stadium substructure in October 2015. In December the construction site began to bring in heavy equipment and construction materials. In January 2015, crews began driving piles.

In March 2015, the stadium project was revised, reducing the cost of construction to 3 billion rubles. In the summer of 2015 pile driving was completed and superstructure construction began.

In December 2015, work began on the installation of the metal roof frame. In July 2016 work on the concrete stadium bowl began. In addition, builders started construction of the facade and began landscaping the adjacent territory to the stadium. In November 2016 the reinforced concrete work of the stadium main bowl was fully completed and the installation of load bearing roof structures began. On 22 December 2017 the construction of the stadium was completed. On 15 April 2018 the stadium hosted its first game between FC Rostov and FC SKA-Khabarovsk. The stadium was officially opened on 13 May 2018, with a friendly football match between the FC Rostov and FK Ural.

== Design ==
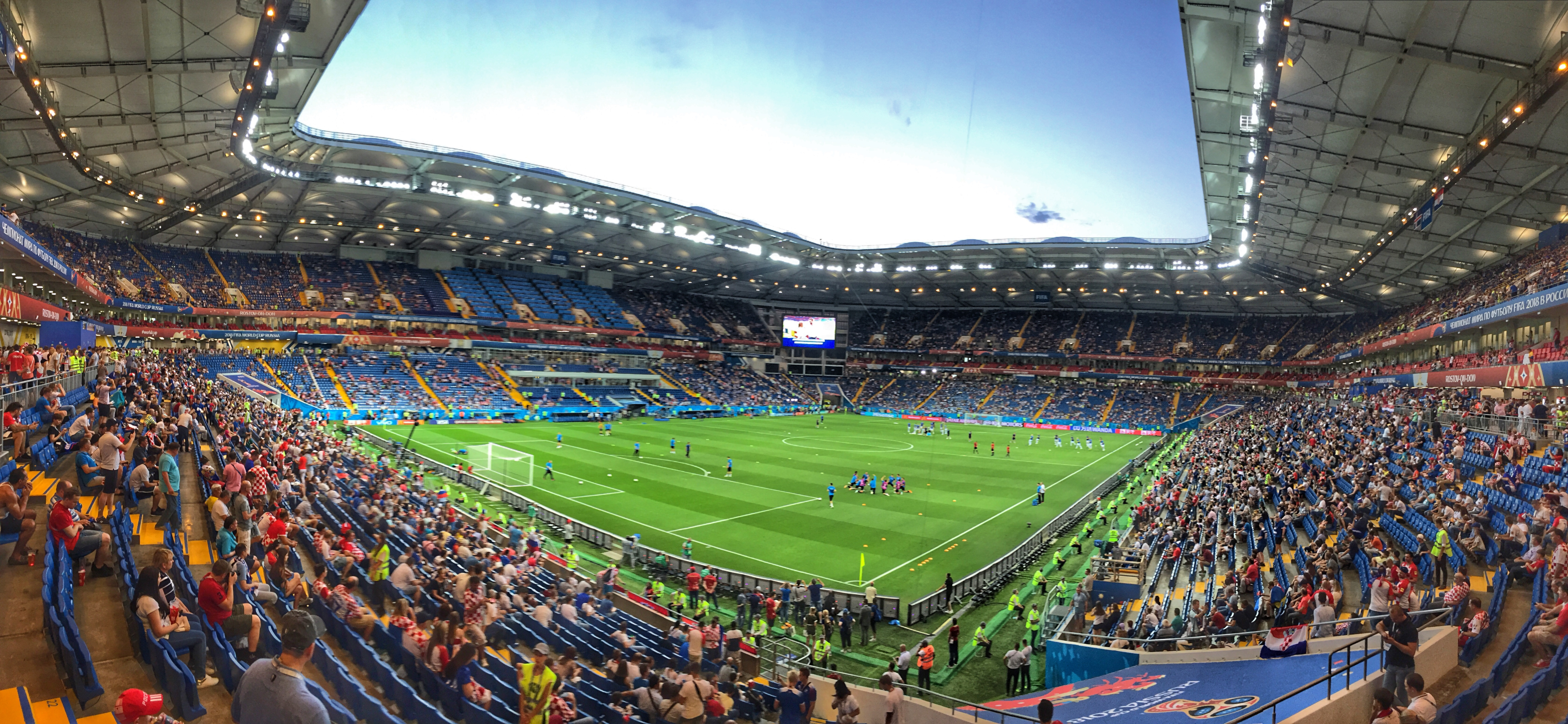
Rostov Arena

In 2011, the final design for the new stadium was presented by Populous. The irregular shape of both the roof and stands are distinctive features. Part of the seating is to be temporary, for the 2018 World Cup. After the tournament capacity may be decreased to 42,000. As the main architect for Rostov Region confirmed, this stadium is to be the start of a new city centre. It will be the first large project built on the southern bank of the Don River, with the rest of the city lying north. The total cost of the stadium was 19,84 billion rubles.

== 2018 FIFA World Cup ==
Rostov Arena hosted five games during the 2018 FIFA World Cup.

Date	Time	Team No. 1	Result	Team No. 2	Round	Attendance
17 June 2018	21:00	Brazil	1–1	Switzerland	Group E	43,109
20 June 2018	18:00	Uruguay	1–0	Saudi Arabia	Group A	42,678
23 June 2018	18:00	South Korea	1–2	Mexico	Group F	43,472
26 June 2018	21:00	Iceland	1–2	Croatia	Group D	43,472
2 July 2018	21:00	Belgium	3–2	Japan	Round of 16	41,466

== Other International Soccer Matches ==
Date	Competition	Team	Result	Team	Attendance
10 Sep 2018	International Friendly	Russia	5–1	Czech Republic	37,800

== After 2018 FIFA World Cup ==
After the 2018 FIFA World Cup, the arena is to be used for the matches of local FC Rostov and for the Russia national football team games, as well as for other sporting and cultural events.
