= Roman Tugarev =

Russian footballer

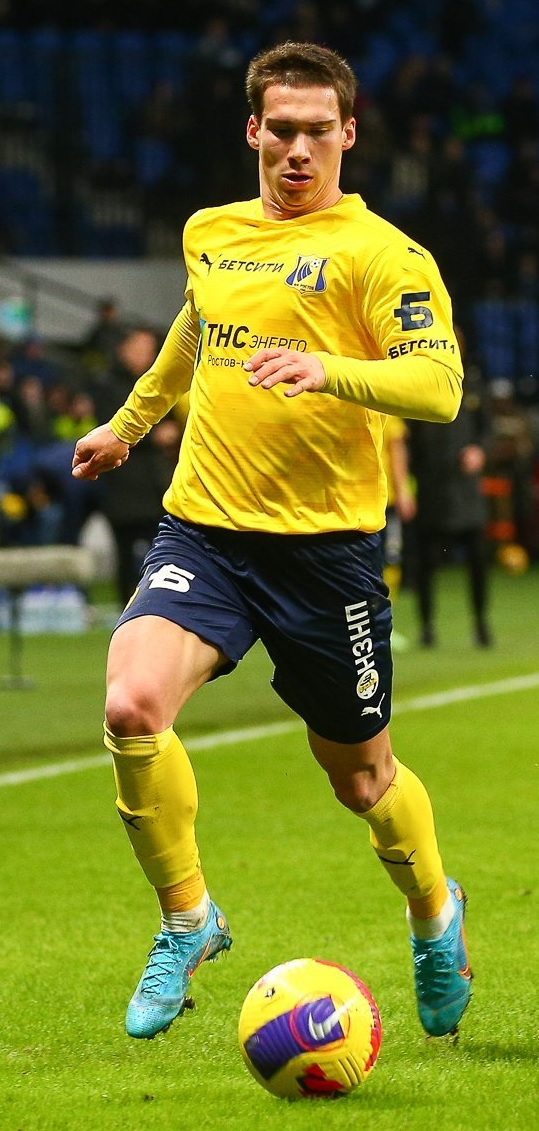
- Tugarev with Rostov in 2022

Personal information
- Full name: Roman Ivanovich Tugarev
- Date of birth: 22 July 1998 (age 28)
- Place of birth: Izhevsk, Russia
- Height: 1.70 m (5 ft 7 in)
- Position: Winger

Team information
- Current team: SKA Rostov

Youth career
- 2004–2009: SOYUZ-Gazprom Izhevsk
- 2009–2017: Lokomotiv Moscow

Senior career*
Years	Team	Apps	(Gls)
2017–2020	Lokomotiv Moscow	10	(0)
2018–2019	→ Kazanka Moscow	33	(20)
2020	→ Rostov (loan)	8	(1)
2021–2025	Rostov	52	(4)
2024	→ Torpedo Moscow (loan)	11	(0)
2024	→ Rostov-2	2	(0)
2025	Elimai	14	(1)
2026–	SKA Rostov	0	(0)

International career^{‡}
2013	Russia U-15	2	(0)
2018–2019	Russia U-21	5	(2)
- * Club domestic league appearances and goals as of 19 June 2026 ‡ National team caps and goals as of 5 June 2019

Roman Ivanovich Tugarev (Russian: Роман Иванович Тугарев; born 22 July 1998) is a Russian football player who plays as a left winger or right winger for Media Football League club SKA Rostov.

== Club career ==
He made his debut in the Russian Professional Football League for Kazanka Moscow on 19 July 2017 in a game against Znamya Truda Orekhovo-Zuyevo.

He made his debut in the Russian Premier League for Lokomotiv Moscow on 29 September 2018 in a game against Akhmat Grozny.

On 17 October 2020, he joined Rostov on loan until the end of the 2020–21 season.

On 12 February 2021, he moved to Rostov on a permanent basis and signed a 5-year contract with the club.

On 16 February 2024, Tugarev was loaned by Torpedo Moscow.

On 19 January 2025, Tugarev left Rostov by mutual consent.

On 30 January 2025, Tugarev signed with Elimai in Kazakhstan.

== Career statistics ==
As of match played 29 November 2023

Appearances and goals by club, season and competition
Club	Season	League			Cup		Continental		Other		Total	
Club	Season	Division	Apps	Goals	Apps	Goals	Apps	Goals	Apps	Goals	Apps	Goals
Kazanka Moscow	2017–18	Russian Second League	25	13	–		–		4 (Note: Appearances in the FNL Cup)	1	29	14
Kazanka Moscow	2018–19	Russian Second League	8	7	–		–		–		8	7
Kazanka Moscow	Total		33	20	0	0	0	0	4	1	37	21
Lokomotiv Moscow	2017–18	Russian Premier League	0	0	0	0	0	0	–		0	0
Lokomotiv Moscow	2018–19	Russian Premier League	5	0	2	0	0	0	–		7	0
Lokomotiv Moscow	2019–20	Russian Premier League	5	0	1	0	0	0	–		6	0
Lokomotiv Moscow	2020–21	Russian Premier League	0	0	–		–		–		0	0
Lokomotiv Moscow	Total		10	0	3	0	0	0	0	0	13	0
Rostov (loan)	2020–21	Russian Premier League	16	1	1	0	–		–		17	1
Rostov	2021–22	Russian Premier League	13	2	1	0	–		–		14	2
Rostov	2022–23	Russian Premier League	24	1	7	3	–		–		31	4
Rostov	2023–24	Russian Premier League	6	1	5	0	–		–		11	1
Rostov	Total		43	4	13	3	0	0	0	0	56	7
Career total			101	25	17	3	0	0	4	1	123	29

== Honours ==
=== Club ===
Lokomotiv Moscow

- Russian Cup: 2018–19
