= Aleksandr Tarasov (footballer, born 2006) =

Russian footballer (born 2006)

Personal information
- Full name: Aleksandr Sergeyevich Tarasov
- Date of birth: 10 January 2006 (age 20)
- Place of birth: Otradnoye, Kirovsky District, Leningrad Oblast, Russia
- Height: 1.83 m (6 ft 0 in)
- Position: Left-back

Team information
- Current team: Spartak Kostroma (on loan from Rostov)
- Number: 47

Youth career
- –2024: Zenit St. Petersburg

Senior career*
Years	Team	Apps	(Gls)
2025	Zenit-2 St. Petersburg	1	(1)
2025–	Rostov	4	(0)
2025–	→ Rostov-2	14	(0)
2026–	→ Spartak Kostroma (loan)	0	(0)

International career^{‡}
2024	Russia U-19	1	(0)
2025–	Russia U-21	4	(0)
- * Club domestic league appearances and goals as of 4 April 2026 ‡ National team caps and goals as of 30 March 2026

Aleksandr Sergeyevich Tarasov (Russian: Александр Сергеевич Тарасов; born 10 January 2006) is a Russian football player who plays as a left-back for Spartak Kostroma on loan from Rostov.

== Career ==
Tarasov was raised in the youth system of Zenit St. Petersburg, where he played for their U-19 squad and the reserve team. On 27 June 2025, he signed a five-year contract with Russian Premier League club Rostov.

Tarasov made his RPL debut for Rostov in the 2025–26 season opener against his youth club Zenit on 20 July 2025.

On 1 July 2026, Tarasov moved on loan to Spartak Kostroma for the 2026–27 season.

== Career statistics ==
As of 4 April 2026

Club	Season	League			Cup		Total	
Club	Season	Division	Apps	Goals	Apps	Goals	Apps	Goals
Zenit-2 St. Petersburg	2025	Russian Second League B	1	1	–		1	1
Rostov	2025–26	Russian Premier League	4	0	2	0	6	0
Rostov-2	2025	Russian Second League B	9	0	–		9	0
Rostov-2	2026	Russian Second League B	5	0	–		5	0
Rostov-2	Total		14	0	0	0	14	0
Career total			19	1	2	0	21	1
