= Ivan Kuznetsov (footballer) =

Russian footballer (born 2004)

Personal information
- Full name: Ivan Sergeyevich Kuznetsov
- Date of birth: 15 February 2004 (age 22)
- Height: 1.77 m (5 ft 10 in)
- Position: Right-back

Youth career
- –2020: Ural Yekaterinburg
- 2020–2022: UOR-5 Yegoryevsk
- 2022–2023: Rostov

Senior career*
Years	Team	Apps	(Gls)
2023	Rostov	0	(0)
2024	Rostov-2	0	(0)

International career^{‡}
2020	Russia U-16	3	(0)
- * Club domestic league appearances and goals as of 16 November 2024 ‡ National team caps and goals as of 3 March 2020

Ivan Sergeyevich Kuznetsov (Russian: Иван Сергеевич Кузнецов; born 15 February 2004) is a Russian football player who plays as a right-back.

== Career ==
Kuznetsov made his debut for Rostov on 26 July 2023 in a Russian Cup game against Rubin Kazan.

== Career statistics ==
As of match played 26 July 2023

Appearances and goals by club, season and competition
Club	Season	League			Cup		Continental		Other		Total	
Club	Season	Division	Apps	Goals	Apps	Goals	Apps	Goals	Apps	Goals	Apps	Goals
Rostov	2023–24	Russian Premier League	0	0	1	0	–		–		1	0
Career total			0	0	1	0	0	0	0	0	1	0
