= Jordhy Thompson =

Chilean footballer (born 2004)

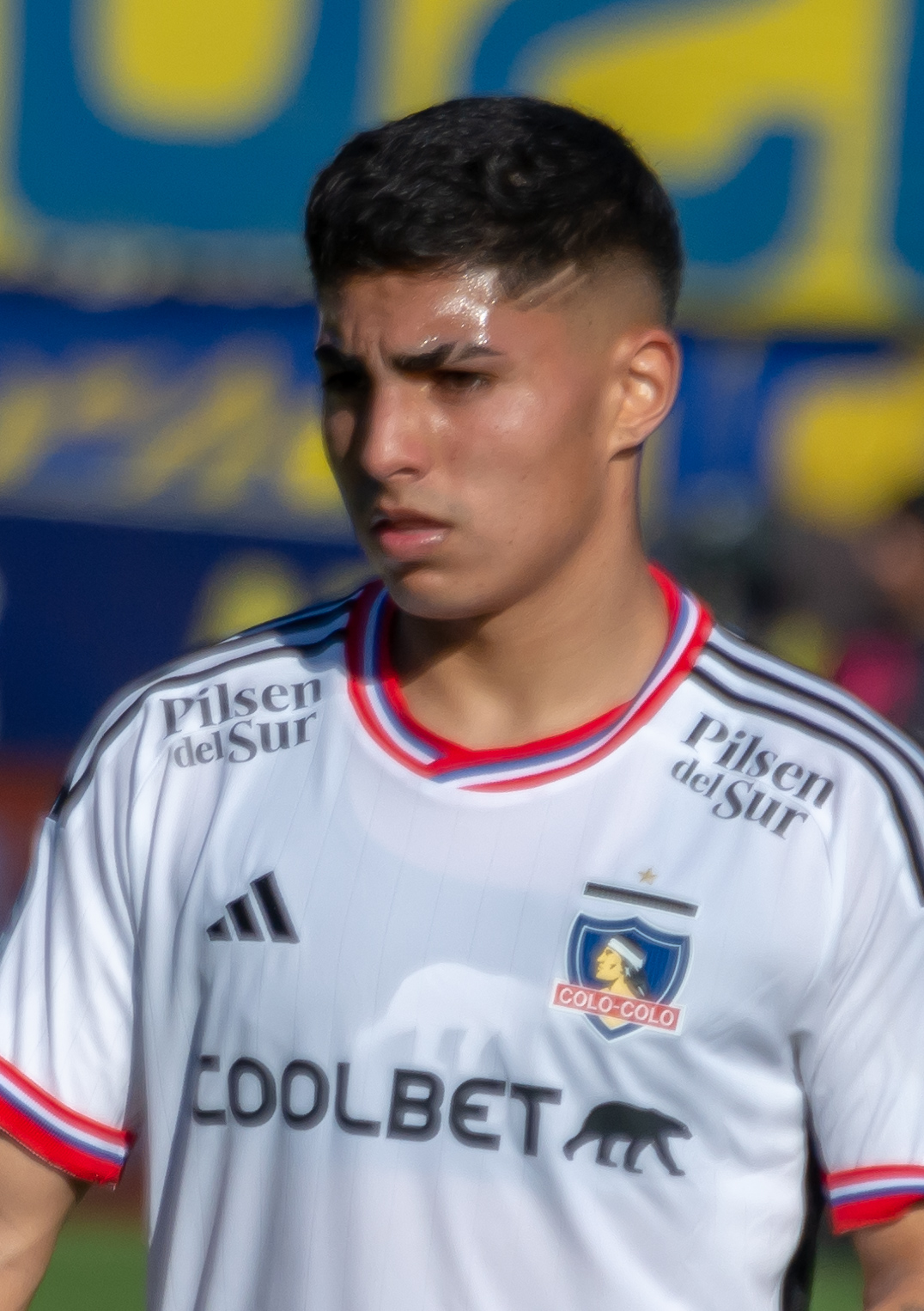
- Thompson with Colo-Colo in 2023

Personal information
- Full name: Jordhy Eduardo Thompson Dávila
- Date of birth: 10 August 2004 (age 22)
- Place of birth: Antofagasta, Chile
- Height: 1.61 m (5 ft 3 in)
- Position: Forward

Team information
- Current team: Orenburg
- Number: 10

Youth career
- Colo-Colo

Senior career*
| Years | Team | Apps | (Gls) |
| 2021–2024 | Colo-Colo | 20 | (3) |
| 2024 | → Orenburg (loan) | 10 | (1) |
| 2024– | Orenburg | 45 | (9) |

International career^{‡}
| 2019 | Chile U15 | | |
| 2021–2022 | Chile U20 | 7 | (0) |
- * Club domestic league appearances and goals as of 21 November 2026 ‡ National team caps and goals as of 8 October 2022

Jordhy Eduardo Thompson Dávila (born 10 August 2004) is a Chilean footballer who plays as a forward for Russian side Orenburg.

== Club career ==
A left-footed winger from the Colo-Colo youth system, Thompson made his debut in a Chilean Primera División match against Ñublense on 1 May 2021 at the age of sixteen, due to Colo-Colo's first team having seventeen players unavailable due to the COVID-19 pandemic. He scored his first professional goal in a match against Deportes Copiapó on 22 January 2023.

In 2024, Thompson moved to Russia, signing on loan with Orenburg on a deal for six months with an option to buy, with the deal in halt pending Thompson's court case. On 3 January 2024, Orenburg signed a lease agreement with Colo Colo for Thompson. According to Orenburg's sporting director Dmitri Andreyev, if it weren't for the legal controversy involving the player, the club couldn't have afforded to lease him.

On 3 June 2024, Orenburg exercised their option to buy him, and signed Thompson on a permanent basis.

On 4 September 2026, Thompson's contract with Orenburg was extended to 2030.

== International career ==
Thompson represented Chile at under-15 level in the 2019 South American Championship.

In December 2021, he represented Chile U20 at Copa Rául Coloma Rivas, playing three matches. In September 2022, he made 2 appearances in the Costa Cálida Supercup. In the 2022 South American Games, he made one appearance.

== Personal life ==
Thompson is of Ecuadorian descent, as his mother, Norma Dávila, was born in Ecuador.

He is the cousin-nephew of former professional footballer Christian Thompson, a former Universidad de Chile player.

=== Controversies ===
On 15 March 2023, videos surfaced on social media of Thompson committing domestic violence on his then girlfriend at a nightclub. Colo Colo suspended the player indefinitely from all first team activities due to the incident, and sent him to psychological counseling. He would be reinstated to the first team on 8 April, but on 17 April, videos went viral on social media showing Thompson once again committing domestic violence on his former girlfriend. On 6 November 2023, Thompson was arrested on suspicion of having attempted to strangle his girlfriend, leading to his arrest. Colo-Colo excluded the player from their senior squad due to the incident.

On 16 November 2023, Thompson's legal team successfully appealed for house arrest instead of pre-trial detention, the player to remain on nightly house arrest for 45 days. His trial is pending, facing charges of attempted femicide and criminal contempt.

== Career statistics ==
As of match played 21 November 2026

Appearances and goals by club, season and competition
| Club | Season | League | | | Cup | | Continental | | Other | | Total | |
| Club | Season | Division | Apps | Goals | Apps | Goals | Apps | Goals | Apps | Goals | Apps | Goals |
|---|---|---|---|---|---|---|---|---|---|---|---|---|
| Colo-Colo | 2021 | Chilean Primera División | 3 | 0 | 0 | 0 | – | | – | | 3 | 0 |
| Colo-Colo | 2022 | Chilean Primera División | 2 | 0 | 0 | 0 | – | | – | | 2 | 0 |
| Colo-Colo | 2023 | Chilean Primera División | 15 | 3 | 6 | 2 | 5 (Note: Three appearances in Copa Libertadores, two appearances and one goal in Copa Sudamericana) | 1 | 1 (Note: Appearance in Supercopa de Chile) | 0 | 27 | 6 |
| Colo-Colo | Total | | 20 | 3 | 6 | 2 | 5 | 1 | 1 | 0 | 32 | 6 |
| Orenburg (loan) | 2023–24 | Russian Premier League | 10 | 1 | 2 | 1 | – | | – | | 12 | 2 |
| Orenburg | 2024–25 | Russian Premier League | 9 | 0 | 3 | 0 | – | | – | | 12 | 0 |
| Orenburg | 2025–26 | Russian Premier League | 28 | 5 | 3 | 0 | – | | – | | 31 | 5 |
| Orenburg | 2026–27 | Russian Premier League | 8 | 4 | 1 | 0 | – | | – | | 9 | 4 |
| Orenburg | Total | | 45 | 9 | 7 | 0 | – | | – | | 52 | 9 |
| Orenburg | Club total | | 55 | 10 | 9 | 1 | – | | – | | 64 | 11 |
| Career total | | | 75 | 13 | 15 | 3 | 5 | 1 | 1 | 0 | 96 | 17 |

== Honours ==
Colo-Colo

- Liga de Primera: 2022
- Copa Chile: 2023
