= Eyad El Askalany =

Egyptian footballer (born 2004)

Personal information
- Full name: Eyad El Askalany Shoeib El Sayed
- Date of birth: 24 December 2004 (age 21)
- Place of birth: Ismailia, Egypt
- Height: 1.79 m (5 ft 10 in)
- Position: Centre-back

Team information
- Current team: Pyramids (on loan from Rostov

Youth career
- Ismaily

Senior career*
Years	Team	Apps	(Gls)
2022–2024	Ismaily	10	(0)
2024–	Rostov	6	(0)
2026–	→ Pyramids (loan)	0	(0)

International career^{‡}
2022–2023	Egypt U-20	6	(0)
- * Club domestic league appearances and goals as of 17 May 2026 ‡ National team caps and goals as of 25 February 2023

Eyad El Askalany Shoeib El Sayed, known as Eyad El Askalany (Arabic: إياد العسقلاني; born 24 December 2004) is an Egyptian football player who plays as a centre-back for Pyramids on loan from Russian club Rostov.

== Club career ==
On 4 February 2024, El Askalany signed a contract with the Russian Premier League club Rostov.

He made his debut for Rostov on 2 April 2024 in a Russian Cup game against Khimki. The game ended scoreless, and El Askalany converted his kick in the penalty shoot-out that Rostov won 7–6.

El Askalany made his league debut for Rostov on 6 April 2024 against Sochi.

In July 2026, El Askalany returned to Egypt and joined Pyramids on a season-long loan with an option to buy.

== International career ==
El Askalany represented Egypt at the 2023 U-20 Africa Cup of Nations.

== Career statistics ==
As of match played 4 March 2026

Appearances and goals by club, season and competition
Club	Season	League			Cup		League Cup		Total	
Club	Season	Division	Apps	Goals	Apps	Goals	Apps	Goals	Apps	Goals
Ismaily	2022–23	Egyptian Premier League	10	0	0	0	0	0	10	0
Ismaily	2023–24	Egyptian Premier League	0	0	0	0	1	0	1	0
Ismaily	Total		10	0	0	0	1	0	11	0
Rostov	2023–24	Russian Premier League	4	0	2	0	–		6	0
Rostov	2024–25	Russian Premier League	2	0	1	0	–		3	0
Rostov	2025–26	Russian Premier League	0	0	1	0	–		1	0
Rostov	Total		6	0	4	0	–		10	0
Career total			16	0	4	0	1	0	21	0
