= FC Rostov =

Russian professional football club

Rostov
- Full name: Футбольный клуб Ростов (Football Club Rostov)
- Nicknames: Selmashi (Derived from the historical name Rostselmash); Muzhiki (Tough Guys)
- Founded: 10 May 1930; 96 years ago
- Ground: Rostov Arena
- Capacity: 45,000
- Owner: Rostov Oblast
- President: Artashes Arutyunyants
- Manager: Dmitri Kirichenko
- League: Russian Premier League
- 2025–26: Russian Premier League, 10th of 16
- Website: www.fc-rostov.ru
| Home colours | Away colours |

FC Rostov (Russian: Футбольный клуб Ростов, romanized: Futbolnyy klub Rostov) is a Russian professional football club based in Rostov-on-Don. The club competes in the Russian Premier League, playing their home matches at the Rostov Arena.

== History ==
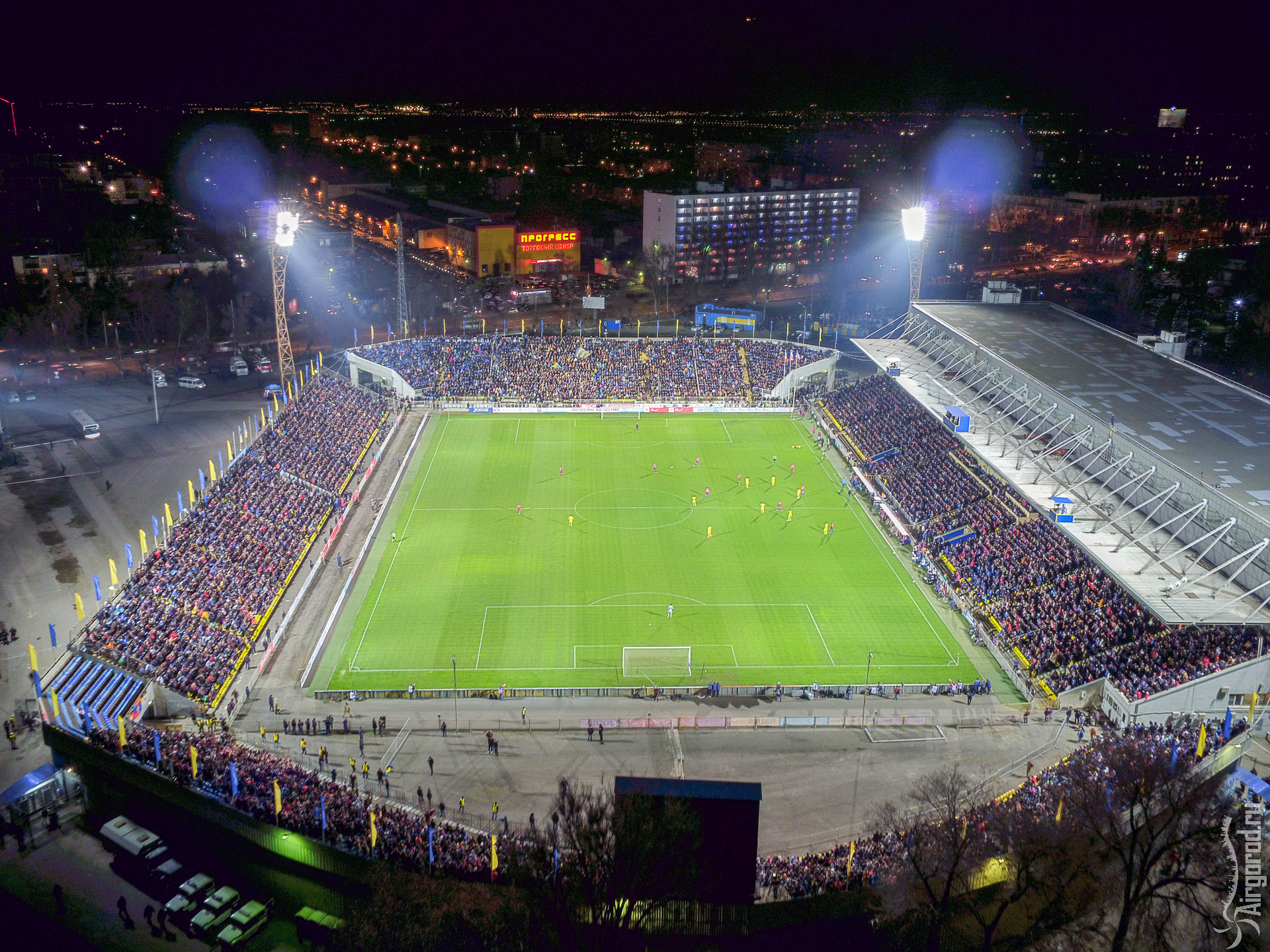
The club's former home stadium, Olimp-2

=== Soviet era (1930–1991), Rostselmash ===
The club was established on 10 May 1930, and was initially named Selmashstroy (Сельмашстрой). They were renamed Selmash in 1936 and Traktor in 1941. In 1950, the club joined the South Zone of the Azov-Don group of the Russian SFSR Championship. The following season they were placed in Group B of the championship. After finishing first in their group, they played in Group A in 1952. A third-place finish meant the club were promoted to the Class B for the 1953 season, during which they were renamed again, becoming Torpedo. In 1958, they were renamed Rostselmash.

In 1964 the club won their Division of Class B. In the Russian-zone play-offs they finished second in the first round and top in the second after defeating Terek Grozny 2–0 in the deciding match, earning promotion to the Soviet First League. The following season they finished bottom of the division, but were not relegated as the number of teams in the division was increased.

By the early 1970s the club was back in the Russian leagues. In 1975 they returned to Class B (now known as the Soviet Second League). Following several near misses, the club won their zone of the Second League in 1985. They went on to win a play-off tournament, earning promotion back to the First League.

=== Modern era (1991–present) ===
In 1991 the club finished fourth in what was the final season of Soviet football following the USSR's disintegration. This was enough to earn them a place in the new Russian Top League. Following an eighth-place finish in their first season, the 1993 season saw the club struggle, eventually finishing second bottom, resulting in relegation to the First League.

The club made an immediate return to the Top League after finishing second in the 1994 First League season. In 2003, they adopted their current name and reached the Russian Cup final for the first time, losing 1–0 to Spartak Moscow. In 2007 they finished bottom of the (now renamed) Premier Division and were relegated to the First Division. However, they made another return to the top division as First Division champions.

Rostov won the 2013–14 Russian Cup, defeating FC Krasnodar on penalties 6–5, and earned qualification to the 2014–15 UEFA Europa League. However Rostov were excluded from the competition at the end of May 2014, due to breached financial rules, being replaced by Spartak Moscow. Later Rostov appealed the decision of the local football federation to lift the club from the tournament in the Court of Arbitration for Sport in Lausanne, the club won the right to play.

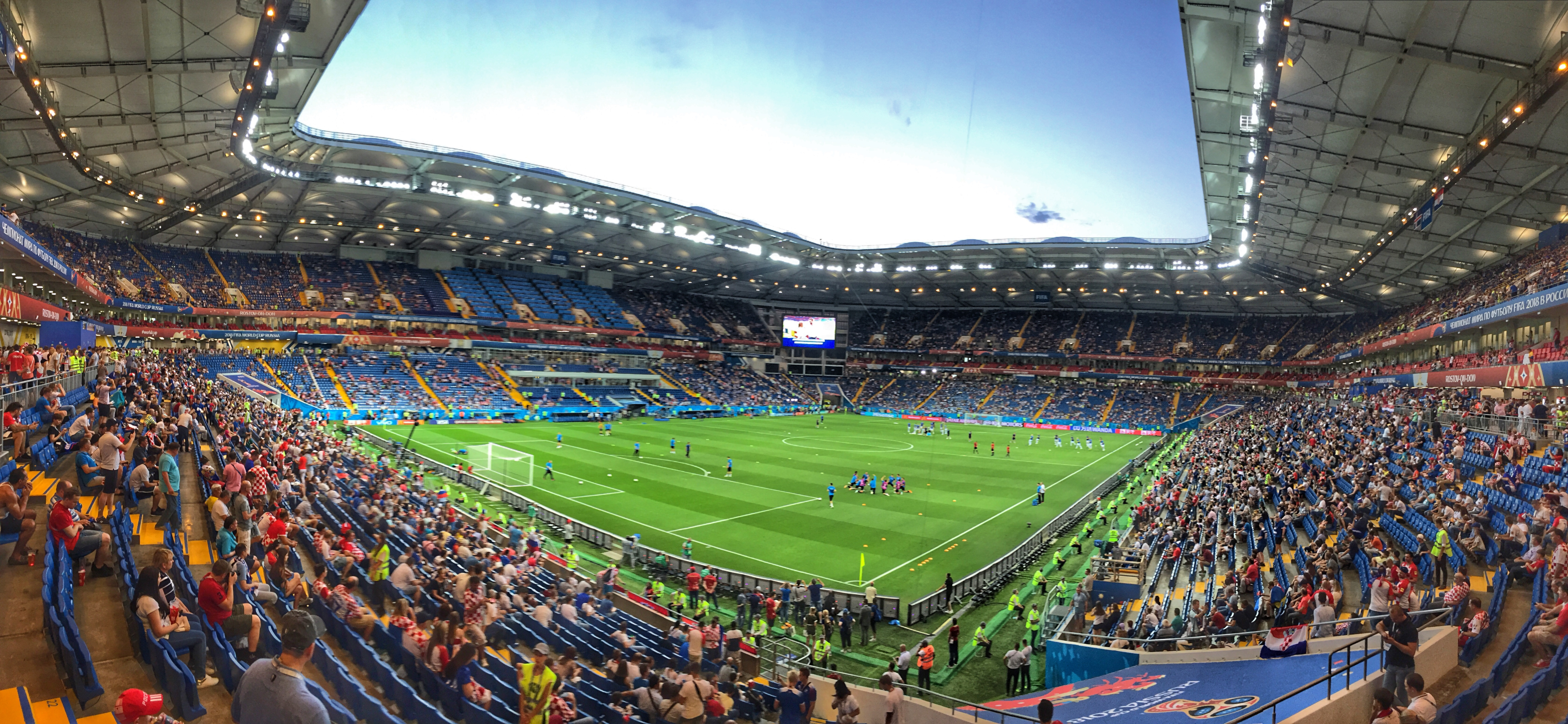
The club's current home stadium, Rostov Arena

On 18 December 2014, the official website of FC Rostov announced the appointment of Kurban Berdyev as head coach. Under his leadership, the team has maintained a place in the Premier League on aggregate (1–0, 4–1) beating "Tosno" in the play-offs Premier League – First Division. Throughout the second half of 2015, the club had problems with the payment of salaries and bonuses the players, but it has not prevented the club at the end of the first part of the season 2015–16 to hold 2nd place in the championship.

In the 2016–17 season, Rostov earned a UEFA Champions League spot in the League Route as runners-up of the Russian Premier League. In the third qualifying round, they were drawn against Anderlecht. After a 2–2 home draw, they beat Anderlecht 2–0 away. In the play-off, Rostov were drawn against Dutch giants Ajax. In the first leg in Amsterdam, Netherlands, they held on to a 1–1 draw, which gave them an away goal advantage. In the return leg, Rostov earned a 4–1 surprise win over Ajax and qualified for the UEFA Champions League group stages, a stunning performance as was their first qualification into the group stages of a European tournament. Rostov were drawn in Group D, against Bayern Munich, Atlético Madrid and PSV Eindhoven, gaining their first Champions League victory on 23 November 2016, defeating Bayern Munich 3–2 at Olimp-2.

On 9 June 2017, Rostov announced Leonid Kuchuk as their new manager on a one-year contract with the option of an additional year. Kuchuk resigned and was replaced by Valeri Karpin during the winter break in December 2017.

On 19 June 2020, Rostov were due to play their first match of the restarted Russian Premier League season, which had been suspended due to the COVID-19 pandemic, against PFC Sochi. Rostov were in fourth place, just a few points of UEFA Champions League qualification. A few days before the match, six players in Rostov's first-team squad tested positive for the coronavirus, putting the entire first-team squad into a 14-day quarantine period. This forced the club to select their Under-18 squad to play the match, making it the youngest starting 11 and the youngest matchday squad in Russian Premier League history. Rostov would go on to lose 10–1, but the youngsters were highly praised for their performance with 17-year-old goalkeeper Denis Popov named man-of-the-match after saving a penalty and making 15 saves, a Russian Premier League record, and 17-year-old Roman Romanov scoring his first senior goal on his debut in the first minute of the match.

On 26 October 2021, Rostov announced Turkmenistani coach Vitaly Kafanov as their new manager.

In 2022, the European Club Association suspended Rostov, citing the Russian invasion of Ukraine.

Rostov was 2nd in the 2022–23 Russian Premier League with 5 games left, but lost 4 out of 5 games and dropped to 4th place at the final table.

In the first match of the 2023–24 RPL season with Fakel Voronezh, Rostov scored his thousandth goal in the history of the Russian championships, becoming the sixth team to have such an achievement.

In the 2024–25 season, Rostov reached the Russian Cup superfinal, which they lost to CSKA in a penalty shoot-out.

Mohammad Mohebi was selected to represent Iran at the 2026 FIFA World Cup.

== Seasons ==
=== Domestic ===
| Season | Div. | Pos. | Pl. | W | D | L | GS | GA | P | Cup | Europe | | Top scorer (league) | Head coach |
|---|---|---|---|---|---|---|---|---|---|---|---|---|---|---|
| 1992 | 1st | 8 | 26 | 8 | 7 | 11 | 22 | 28 | 23 | R8 | - | - | (Russia) Tikhonov – 7 | (Russia) Yulgushov |
| 1993 | 1st | 17 | 34 | 8 | 12 | 14 | 35 | 52 | 28 | R8 | - | - | (Russia) (Georgia (country)) Spanderashvili – 8 | (Russia) Yulgushov |
| 1994 | 2nd | 2 | 42 | 27 | 8 | 7 | 92 | 44 | 62 | R16 | - | - | (Russia) Maslov – 32 | (Russia) Yulgushov |
| 1995 | 1st | 14 | 30 | 8 | 4 | 18 | 35 | 56 | 28 | R16 | - | - | (Russia) Maslov – 18 | (Russia) Yulgushov (Russia) (Ukraine) Andreyev |
| 1996 | 1st | 11 | 34 | 11 | 8 | 15 | 58 | 60 | 41 | R8 | - | - | (Russia) Maslov – 23 | (Russia) (Ukraine) Andreyev |
| 1997 | 1st | 13 | 34 | 9 | 14 | 11 | 34 | 38 | 41 | R16 | - | - | (Russia) Gerasimenko – 8 | (Russia) (Ukraine) Andreyev |
| 1998 | 1st | 6 | 30 | 11 | 11 | 8 | 42 | 38 | 44 | QF | - | - | (Russia) Matveyev – 14 | (Russia) (Ukraine) Andreyev |
| 1999 | 1st | 7 | 30 | 11 | 8 | 11 | 32 | 37 | 41 | R16 | UIC | SF | (Ukraine) Pestryakov – 7 | (Russia) (Ukraine) Andreyev |
| 2000 | 1st | 12 | 30 | 6 | 14 | 10 | 24 | 27 | 32 | R16 | UIC | 3R | (Russia) Kirichenko – 14 | (Russia) (Ukraine) Andreyev |
| 2001 | 1st | 12 | 30 | 8 | 8 | 14 | 29 | 43 | 32 | R16 | - | - | (Russia) Kirichenko – 13 | (Russia) Balakhnin (Russia) Baidachny |
| 2002 | 1st | 11 | 30 | 7 | 10 | 13 | 29 | 49 | 31 | RU | - | - | (Ghana) Adamu – 5 | (Russia) Baidachny (Russia) Balakhnin |
| 2003 | 1st | 11 | 30 | 8 | 10 | 12 | 30 | 42 | 34 | QF | - | - | (Russia) Osinov – 7 | (Russia) Balakhnin |
| 2004 | 1st | 12 | 30 | 7 | 8 | 15 | 28 | 42 | 29 | R8 | - | - | (Uruguay) Pérez – 5 | (Russia) Shevchenko (Russia) Balakhnin |
| 2005 | 1st | 13 | 30 | 8 | 7 | 15 | 26 | 41 | 31 | R16 | - | - | (Russia) Buznikin – 8 | (Russia) Styopushkin (Russia) Petrakov |
| 2006 | 1st | 12 | 30 | 10 | 6 | 14 | 42 | 48 | 36 | QF | - | - | (Russia) Osinov – 12 | (Russia) Balakhnin |
| 2007 | 1st | 16 | 30 | 2 | 12 | 16 | 18 | 44 | 18 | R8 | - | - | (Russia) Osinov – 4 (Malawi) Kanyenda – 4 | (Russia) Dolmatov |
| 2008 | 2nd | 1 | 42 | 29 | 9 | 4 | 78 | 29 | 96 | R32 | - | - | (Russia) Osinov – 16 | (Russia) Dolmatov |
| 2009 | 1st | 14 | 30 | 7 | 11 | 12 | 28 | 39 | 32 | R16 | - | - | (Russia) Akimov – 6 (Bosnia and Herzegovina) Ahmetović – 6 | (Russia) Dolmatov |
| 2010 | 1st | 9 | 30 | 10 | 4 | 16 | 27 | 44 | 34 | SF | - | - | (Russia) Adamov – 8 | (Ukraine) Protasov |
| 2011–12 | 1st | 13 | 44 | 12 | 12 | 20 | 45 | 61 | 48 | SF | - | - | (Russia) Adamov – 11 | (Ukraine) Protasov (Ukraine) Lyutyi (Russia) Talalayev (Russia) Balakhnin (Russia) Baidachny |
| 2012–13 | 1st | 13 | 30 | 7 | 8 | 15 | 30 | 41 | 29 | SF | - | - | (Czech Republic) Holenda – 6 | (Montenegro) Božović |
| 2013–14 | 1st | 7 | 30 | 10 | 9 | 11 | 40 | 40 | 39 | Winner | - | - | (Russia) Dzyuba – 17 | (Montenegro) Božović |
| 2014–15 | 1st | 14 | 30 | 7 | 8 | 15 | 27 | 51 | 29 | R16 | UEL | PO | (Russia) Grigoryev – 5 | (Montenegro) Božović (Turkmenistan) Berdyev |
| 2015–16 | 1st | 2 | 30 | 19 | 6 | 5 | 41 | 20 | 63 | R32 | - | - | (Iran) Azmoun – 9 | (Turkmenistan) Berdyev |
| 2016–17 | 1st | 6 | 30 | 13 | 9 | 8 | 36 | 18 | 48 | R32 | UCL; UEL | GS; R16 | (Iran) Azmoun (Russia) Poloz – 7 | (Turkmenistan) Berdyev (Russia) Kirichenko (caretaker) (Austria) Daniliants |
| 2017–18 | 1st | 11 | 30 | 9 | 10 | 11 | 27 | 28 | 37 | R16 | - | - | (Russia) Ionov – 5 | (Belarus) Kuchuk (Russia) Kirichenko (caretaker) (Russia) Karpin |
| 2018–19 | 1st | 9 | 30 | 10 | 11 | 9 | 25 | 23 | 41 | SF | - | - | (Russia) Ionov – 6 | (Russia) Karpin |
| 2019–20 | 1st | 5 | 30 | 12 | 9 | 9 | 45 | 50 | 45 | R16 | - | - | (Uzbekistan) Shomurodov – 11 | (Russia) Karpin |
| 2020–21 | 1st | 9 | 30 | 13 | 4 | 13 | 37 | 35 | 43 | R16 | UEL | 3QR | (Japan) Hashimoto – 6 (Russia) Poloz – 6 | (Russia) Karpin |
| 2021–22 | 1st | 9 | 30 | 10 | 8 | 12 | 47 | 51 | 38 | R32 | - | - | (Russia) Poloz – 14 | (Russia) Karpin (Russia) Syomin (Russia) Tedeyev (caretaker) (Turkmenistan) Kafanov (Russia) Karpin |
| 2022–23 | 1st | 4 | 30 | 15 | 8 | 7 | 48 | 44 | 53 | SF | - | - | (Russia) Komlichenko – 10 | (Russia) Karpin |
| 2023–24 | 1st | 7 | 30 | 12 | 7 | 11 | 43 | 46 | 43 | SF | - | - | (Russia) Golenkov – 8 | (Russia) Karpin |
| 2024–25 | 1st | 8 | 30 | 10 | 9 | 11 | 41 | 43 | 39 | RU | - | - | (Russia) Osipenko – 9 | (Russia) Karpin (Spain) Alba |
| 2025–26 | 1st | 10 | 30 | 8 | 9 | 13 | 25 | 32 | 33 | RPS2 | - | - | (Brazil) Ronaldo – 6 | (Spain) Alba |

=== European ===
As of match played 24 September 2020

| Competition | Pld | W | D | L | GF | GA |
|---|---|---|---|---|---|---|
| UEFA Intertoto Cup | 8 | 2 | 1 | 5 | 7 | 18 |
| UEFA Europa League | 7 | 1 | 3 | 3 | 7 | 7 |
| UEFA Champions League | 10 | 3 | 4 | 3 | 15 | 16 |
| Total | 25 | 6 | 8 | 11 | 29 | 41 |

| Season | Competition | Round | Opponent | Home | Away | Aggregate |
|---|---|---|---|---|---|---|
| 1999 | UEFA Intertoto Cup | 2R | (North Macedonia) FK Cementarnica 55 | 2–1 | 1–1 | 3–2 |
| 1999 | UEFA Intertoto Cup | 3R | (Croatia) NK Varteks | 0–1 | 2–1 | 2–2 (a) |
| 1999 | UEFA Intertoto Cup | SF | (Italy) Juventus | 0–4 | 1–5 | 1–9 |
| 2000 | UEFA Intertoto Cup | 3R | (France) AJ Auxerre | 0–2 | 1–3 | 1–5 |
| 2014–15 | UEFA Europa League | PO | (Turkey) Trabzonspor | 0–2 | 0–0 | 0–2 |
| 2016–17 | UEFA Champions League | 3R | (Belgium) Anderlecht | 2–2 | 2–0 | 4–2 |
| 2016–17 | UEFA Champions League | PO | (Netherlands) Ajax | 4–1 | 1–1 | 5–2 |
| 2016–17 | UEFA Champions League | Group D | (Germany) Bayern Munich | 3–2 | 0–5 | 3rd place |
| 2016–17 | UEFA Champions League | Group D | (Spain) Atlético Madrid | 0–1 | 1–2 | 3rd place |
| 2016–17 | UEFA Champions League | Group D | (Netherlands) PSV Eindhoven | 2–2 | 0–0 | 3rd place |
| 2016–17 | UEFA Europa League | R32 | (Czech Republic) Sparta Prague | 4–0 | 1–1 | 5–1 |
| 2016–17 | UEFA Europa League | R16 | (England) Manchester United | 1–1 | 0–1 | 1–2 |
| 2020–21 | UEFA Europa League | 3Q | (Israel) Maccabi Haifa | 1–2 | —N/a | 1–2 |

Notes

- 3Q: Third qualifying round
- 2R: Second round
- 3R: Third round
- PO: Play-off round
- SF: Semi–finals

== Honours ==
=== Domestic competitions ===
- Russian Premier League
  - Runners-up (1): 2015–16
- Russian Cup
  - Winners (1): 2013–14
- Russian Super Cup
  - Runners-up (1): 2014
- Russian National Football League
  - Winners (1): 2008

== Players ==
=== Current squad ===
As of 10 September 2026, according to the Russian Premier League's official website.

Note: Flags indicate national team as defined under FIFA eligibility rules; some limited exceptions apply. Players may hold more than one non-FIFA nationality.

| No. | Pos. | Nation | Player |
|---|---|---|---|
| 1 | GK | TJK | Rustam Yatimov |
| 3 | DF | NIG | Oumar Sako |
| 4 | DF | RUS | Viktor Melyokhin |
| 5 | MF | RUS | Yaroslav Mikhaylov |
| 6 | DF | NGR | Olakunle Olusegun |
| 7 | FW | BRA | Ronaldo |
| 8 | MF | RUS | Aleksei Mironov |
| 10 | MF | RUS | Ivan Komarov |
| 11 | MF | NGR | Ibraheem Mahfus Ajasa |
| 13 | MF | TKM | Denis Titow |
| 16 | MF | RUS | Maksim Mukhin |
| 18 | MF | RUS | Konstantin Kuchayev |
| 21 | MF | RUS | Daniil Shantaly |
| 22 | DF | RUS | David Semenchuk |
| 26 | DF | RUS | Daniil Khlusevich |

| No. | Pos. | Nation | Player |
|---|---|---|---|
| 27 | MF | RUS | Danila Prokhin |
| 34 | GK | RUS | Daniil Golikov (on loan from Krasnodar) |
| 39 | DF | RUS | Maksim Radchenko |
| 40 | DF | BRA | Ygor Nogueira |
| 57 | DF | RUS | Ilya Zhbanov |
| 59 | DF | RUS | Nikita Babakin |
| 67 | DF | RUS | German Ignatov |
| 73 | MF | RUS | Imran Aznaurov |
| 78 | DF | RUS | Dmitri Chistyakov |
| 79 | FW | RUS | Kirill Cheburakov |
| 80 | DF | RUS | Karim Madrakhimov |
| 84 | GK | RUS | Artyom Petrov |
| 87 | DF | RUS | Andrei Langovich |
| 91 | FW | RUS | Anton Shamonin |
| 99 | FW | RUS | Timur Suleymanov |

=== Out on loan ===
Note: Flags indicate national team as defined under FIFA eligibility rules; some limited exceptions apply. Players may hold more than one non-FIFA nationality.

| No. / Pos. / Nation / Player; — / DF / EGY / Eyad El Askalany (at Pyramids until 30 June 2027) | No. / Pos. / Nation / Player; — / DF / RUS / Aleksandr Tarasov (at Spartak Kostroma until 30 June 2027) |

== Coaching staff ==
| Position | Staff |
|---|---|
| Manager | (Spain) Jonatan Alba |
| First-Team Coach | (Russia) Viktor Onopko (Russia) Mikhail Osinov |
| Analyst/coach | (Spain) Marcos Merino Mazón |
| Goalkeeping coach | (Russia) Andrei Kondratyuk |
| Rehabilitation trainer | (Spain) Álvaro Sayabera Iñarrea |
| Physiotherapist-rehabilitation specialist | (Spain) Raúl Álvarez Canle (Spain) Javier Sanabria Alvaro |
| Physiotherapist | (Spain) Alejandro Nunez Lopez |
| Rehabilitation specialist | (Russia) Aleksei Muzalevsky |
| Doctor | (Russia) Denis Vsyansky |
| Massage therapist | (Russia) Grigory Davidyan |
| Massage therapist | (Russia) Nikita Kovalyov |
| Massage therapist | (Russia) Mikhail Murashkintsev |

Source: Rostov
