= 2025 Russian Cup final =

Суперфинал Кубка России 2025
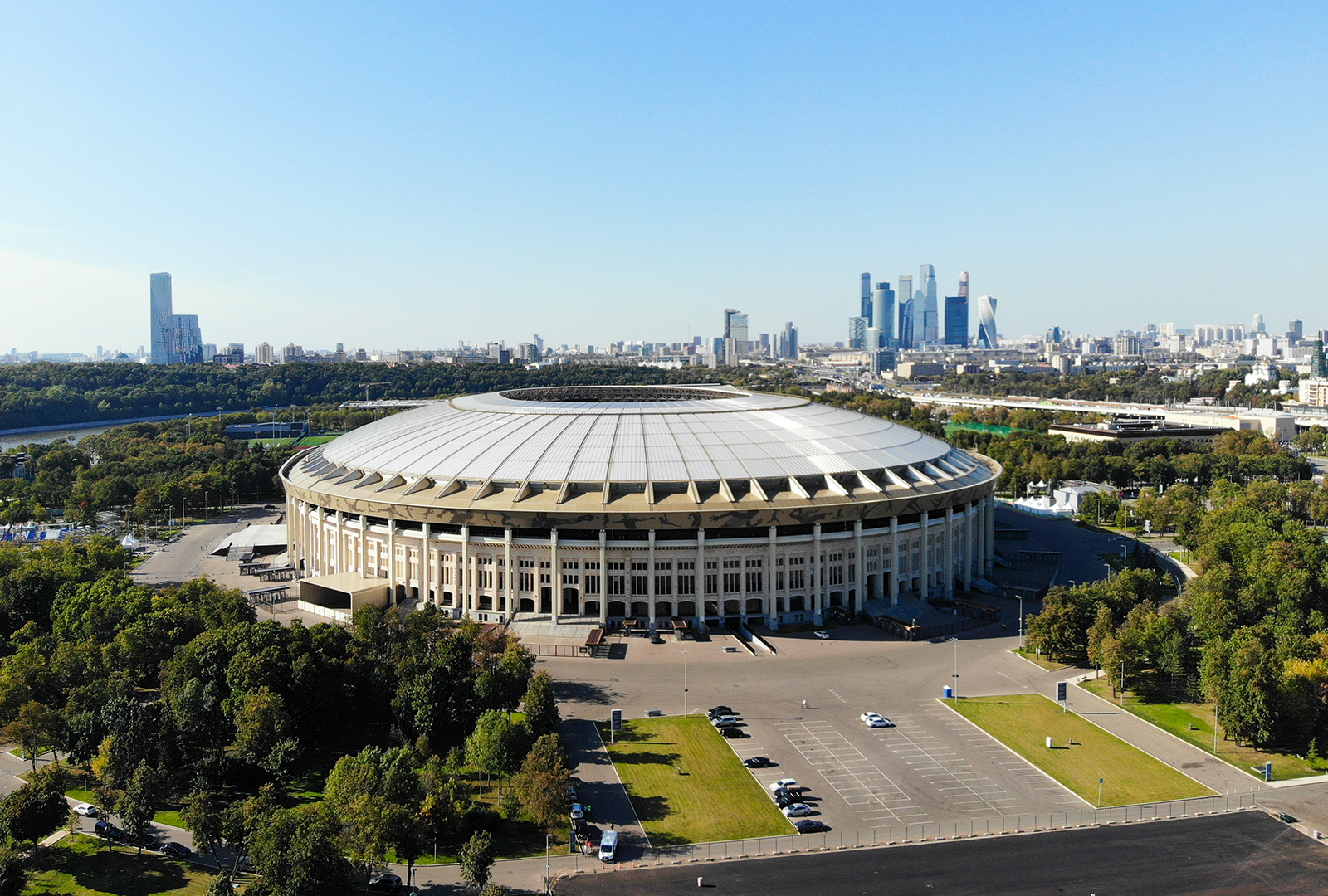
- view of Luzhniki Stadium
- Event: 2024–25 Russian Cup
| Rostov | CSKA Moscow |
| 0 | 0 |
- CSKA won 4–3 in a penalty shoot-out
- Date: 1 June 2025
- Venue: Luzhniki Stadium, Moscow
- Referee: Kirill Levnikov
- Attendance: 57,176

The 2025 Russian Cup final (formally 'Superfinal' due to the competition structure) was the 33rd Russian Cup Final, the final match of the 2024–25 Russian Cup. It was played at Luzhniki Stadium in Moscow, Russia, on 1 June 2025, contested by Rostov and CSKA Moscow.

CSKA Moscow won the match 4–3 on penalties following a 0–0 draw after regular time. As winners, they earned the right to play against the winners of the 2024–25 Russian Premier League, Krasnodar, in the 2025 Russian Super Cup.

== Club competition history ==
CSKA won the Soviet Cup 5 times and the Russian Cup 8 times previously, in 1945, 1948, 1951, 1955, 1990–91, 2001–02, 2004–05, 2005–06, 2007–08, 2008–09, 2010–11, 2012–13 and 2022–23.

Rostov won the Russian Cup once before, in the 2013–14 season.

== Path to the final ==
Rostov finished the group stage of the cup in second place in group B. Rostov then eliminated Spartak Moscow in the RPL path quarterfinal and lost to Zenit St. Petersburg in the RPL path semi-final. It then (according to the double-elimination competition structure of the cup) transferred into the Regions path, where they eliminated Lokomotiv Moscow and then Spartak Moscow for the second time to reach the final.

CSKA won Group C at the group stage, then eliminated Rubin Kazan, Dynamo Moscow and Zenit St. Petersburg (the latter in the penalty shoot-out) to reach the final.

== Gallery ==
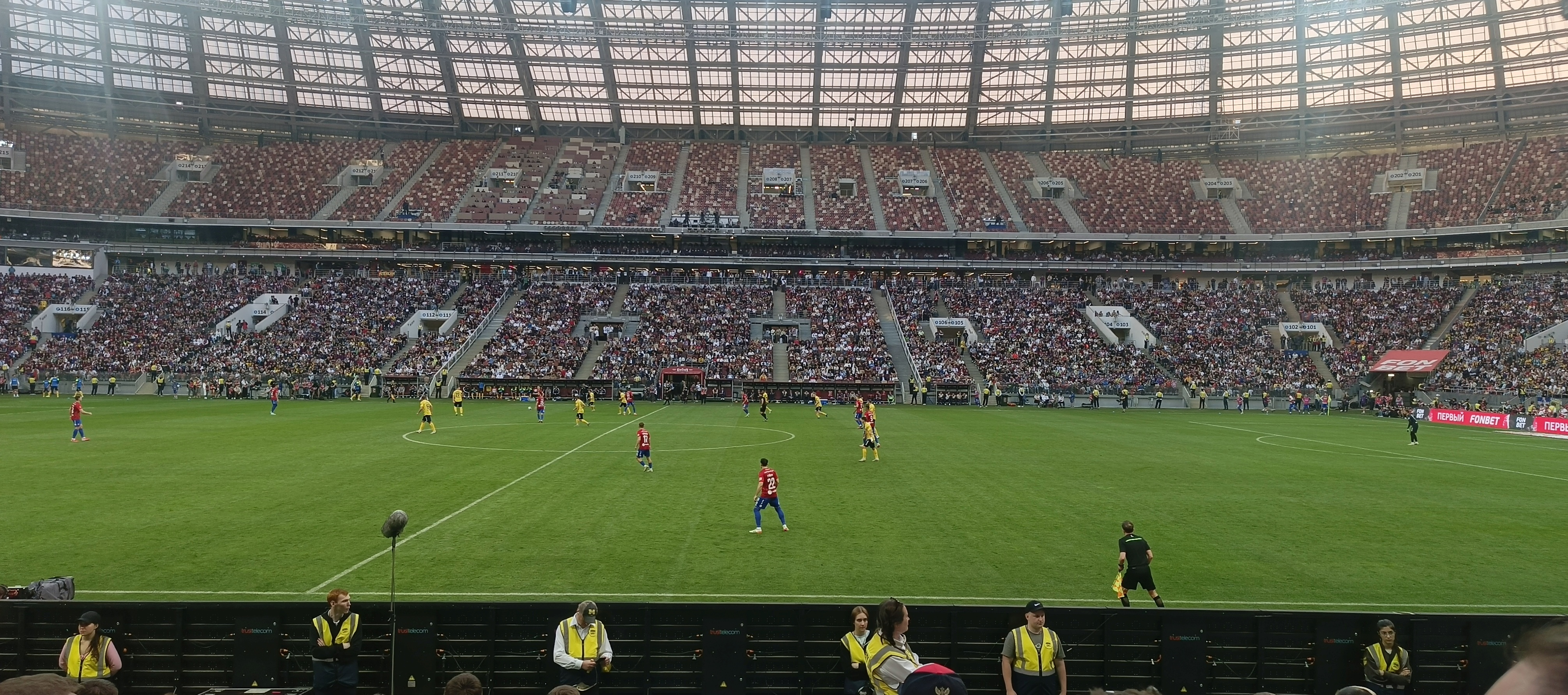
One of the moments of the match

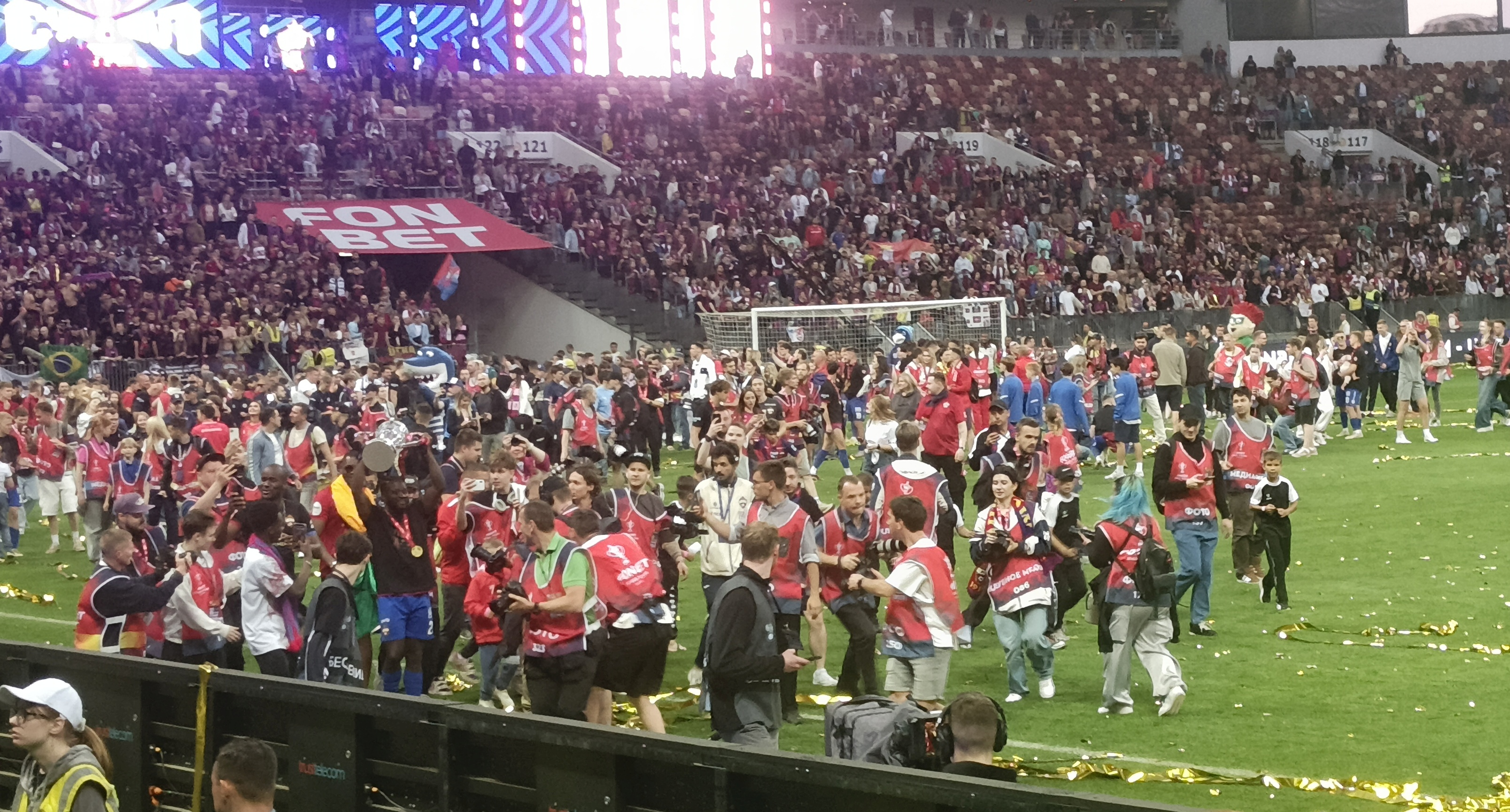
Sékou Koïta is holding Russian Cup while CSKA team is celebrating

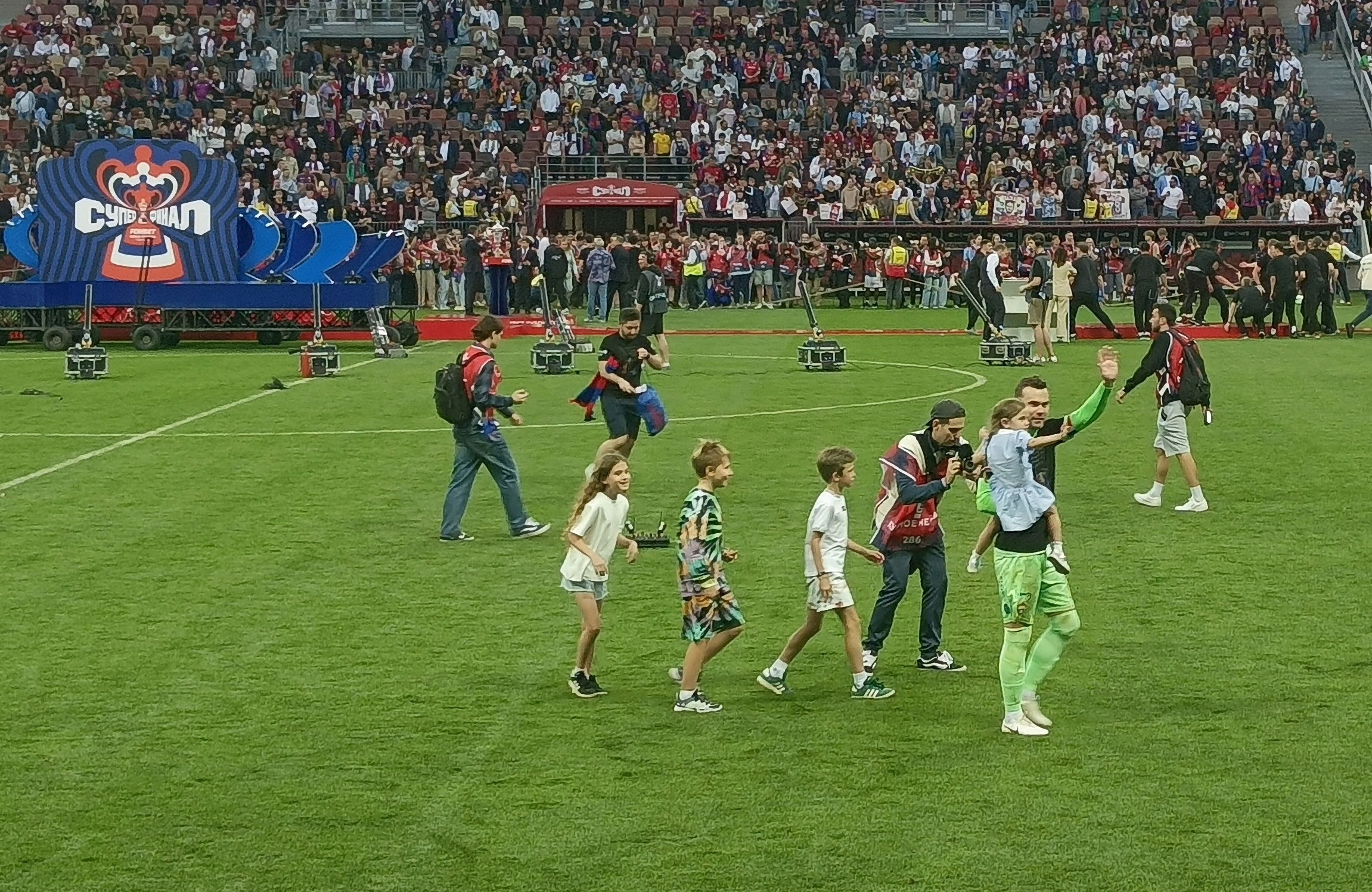
Igor Akinfeev is celebrating with his children as the match took place on Children's Day.

== Match ==
=== Details ===
The formal host was determined by a draw on 15 May 2025. The host club chose the dressing room, the reserves bench, the uniform color and the times for warm-up and pre-game press conference.

1 June 2025
18:00 MSK (UTC+3)

| Rostov (1) | 0–0 | CSKA Moscow (1) |
|---|---|---|
| | Report |
Penalties
| Bayramyan (penalty missed); Komlichenko (penalty scored); Sutormin (penalty missed); Sako (penalty scored); Osipenko (penalty scored) | 3–4 | (penalty scored) Pjanić; (penalty missed) Diveyev; (penalty scored) Oblyakov; (penalty scored) Kislyak; (penalty scored) Gajić |

Luzhniki Stadium, Moscow
Attendance: 57,176
Referee: Kirill Levnikov

| Rostov | CSKA Moscow |

| GK | 1 | (Tajikistan) Rustam Yatimov |
| RB | 40 | (Russia) Ilya Vakhaniya | | (substituted off) 88' |
| CB | 3 | (Niger) Oumar Sako | (yellow card) 58' |
| CB | 4 | (Russia) Viktor Melyokhin | (yellow card) 45+5' |
| LB | 55 | (Russia) Maksim Osipenko |
| CM | 10 | (Russia) Kirill Shchetinin | (yellow card) 82' | (substituted off) 88' |
| CM | 58 | (Russia) Daniil Shantaly |
| CM | 18 | (Russia) Konstantin Kuchayev | | (substituted off) 73' |
| RF | 7 | (Brazil) Ronaldo |
| CF | 27 | (Russia) Nikolay Komlichenko (c) |
| LF | 69 | (Russia) Yegor Golenkov | | (substituted off) 78' |
Substitutes:
| GK | 13 | (Bosnia and Herzegovina) Hidajet Hankić |
| GK | 71 | (Russia) Daniil Odoyevsky |
| DF | 5 | (Russia) Nikolai Poyarkov |
| DF | 39 | (Russia) Maksim Radchenko |
| DF | 57 | (Russia) Ilya Zhbanov |
| DF | 67 | (Russia) German Ignatov |
| DF | 87 | (Russia) Andrei Langovich | | (substituted on) 88' |
| MF | 11 | (Russia) Aleksei Sutormin | | (substituted on) 78' |
| MF | 34 | (Armenia) Khoren Bayramyan | | (substituted on) 88' |
| MF | 51 | (Russia) Aleksey Koltakov |
| MF | 62 | (Russia) Ivan Komarov | | (substituted on) 73' |
| FW | 91 | (Russia) Anton Shamonin |
Manager:
(Spain) Jonatan Alba

| GK | 35 | (Russia) Igor Akinfeev (c) |
| RB | 22 | (Serbia) Milan Gajić |
| CB | 78 | (Russia) Igor Diveyev |
| CB | 4 | (Brazil) Willyan Rocha |
| LB | 27 | (Brazil) Moisés |
| DM | 31 | (Russia) Matvey Kislyak |
| CM | 10 | (Russia) Ivan Oblyakov |
| CM | 25 | (Serbia) Kristijan Bistrović | (substituted off) 73' |
| AM | 11 | (Bosnia and Herzegovina) Miralem Pjanić |
| CF | 20 | (Mali) Sékou Koïta | (substituted off) 67' |
| CF | 9 | (Venezuela) Saúl Guarirapa | (substituted off) 87' |
Substitutes:
| GK | 49 | (Russia) Vladislav Torop |
| DF | 3 | (Russia) Danil Krugovoy |
| DF | 13 | (Brazil) Khellven |
| DF | 51 | (Russia) Dzhamalutdin Abdulkadyrov |
| DF | 90 | (Russia) Matvey Lukin |
| MF | 6 | (Russia) Maksim Mukhin |
| MF | 17 | (Russia) Kirill Glebov | (substituted on) 87' |
| MF | 19 | (Russia) Rifat Zhemaletdinov |
| MF | 21 | (Uzbekistan) Abbosbek Fayzullaev | (substituted on) 73' |
| FW | 7 | (Brazil) Alerrandro |
| FW | 8 | (Belarus) Artyom Shumansky |
| FW | 11 | (Russia) Tamerlan Musayev | (substituted on) 67' |
Manager:
(Serbia) Marko Nikolić

Assistant referees:
Dmitry Ermakov (St. Petersburg)
Andrey Vereteshkin (St. Petersburg)
Fourth official:
Aleksey Sukhoi (Lyubertsy)
Reserve assistant:
Rustam Mukhtarov (Petrozavodsk)
Inspector:
Sergey Zuev (Moscow)
VAR:
Vitali Meshkov (Dmitrov)
AVAR:
Andrey Fisenko (Vladivostok)

Match rules

- 90 minutes
- No extra time
- Penalty shoot-out if scores level
- Twelve named substitutes
- Maximum of five substitutions
