= 2024–25 FC Rostov season =

FC Rostov
2024–25 season
- Manager: Valery Karpin (until 25 February); Jonatan Alba (from 25 February)
- Stadium: Rostov Arena
- Premier League: 8th
- Russian Cup: Runners Up
- Top goalscorer: League: Maksim Osipenko (9); All: Two Players (10)
- Highest home attendance: 29,122 vs Spartak Moscow (6 April 2025)
- Lowest home attendance: 6,545 vs Pari NN (30 November 2024)
- Average home league attendance: 14,381 (18 May 2025)
- All statistics correct as of 17 April 2025.

The 2024–25 season was the 95th season in the history of FC Rostov, and the club's 13th consecutive season in Russian Premier League, finishing 8th. In addition to the domestic league, the team participated in the Russian Cup in which they were Runners Up.

== Season events ==
On 16 June, Rostov announced the signing of Rustam Yatimov from Istiklol.

On 20 June, Rostov announced the signing of Konstantin Kuchayev from Pari Nizhny Novgorod.

On 25 June, Rostov announced the signing of Hidajet Hankić from Botev Plovdiv. The following day, 26 June, Rostov announced the permanent singing of Oumar Sako from Arda Kardzhali after previously being on loan at the club.

On 5 July, Rostov announced the signing of Rodrigo Saravia from Peñarol.

On 19 July, Rostov announced the season-long loan signing of Daniil Odoyevsky from Zenit St.Petersburg.

On 15 August, Rostov announced the season-long loan signing of Aleksei Sutormin from Zenit St.Petersburg.

On 25 February, Head Coach Valery Karpin resigned from his position and was replaced by Jonatan Alba.

== Squad ==
As of match played 1 June 2025

No.	Name	Nationality	Position	Date of birth (age)	Signed from	Signed in	Contract ends	Apps.	Goals
Goalkeepers
1	Rustam Yatimov	(Tajikistan)	GK	13 July 1998 (aged 26)	Istiklol	2024		28	0
13	Hidajet Hankić	(Bosnia and Herzegovina)	GK	29 June 1994 (aged 30)	Botev Plovdiv	2024		3	0
71	Daniil Odoyevsky	(Russia)	GK	22 January 2003 (aged 22)	on loan from Zenit St.Petersburg	2024	2025	13	0
Defenders
3	Oumar Sako	(Ivory Coast)	DF	4 May 1996 (aged 29)	Arda Kardzhali	2024		53	1
4	Viktor Melyokhin	(Russia)	DF	16 December 2003 (aged 21)	Academy	2021		106	2
5	Nikolai Poyarkov	(Russia)	DF	16 October 1999 (aged 25)	Lokomotiv Moscow	2019		40	0
34	Eyad El Askalany	(Egypt)	DF	24 December 2004 (aged 20)	Ismaily	2024		9	0
39	Maksim Radchenko	(Russia)	DF	15 June 2007 (aged 17)	Academy	2025		1	0
40	Ilya Vakhaniya	(Russia)	DF	14 January 2001 (aged 24)	Zenit St.Petersburg	2023		75	1
55	Maksim Osipenko	(Russia)	DF	16 May 1994 (aged 31)	Tambov	2020		170	26
67	German Ignatov	(Russia)	DF	11 August 2005 (aged 19)	Academy	2023		19	1
87	Andrei Langovich	(Russia)	DF	28 May 2003 (aged 22)	Academy	2020		112	6
Midfielders
8	Aleksei Mironov	(Russia)	MF	1 January 2000 (aged 25)	Lokomotiv Moscow	2022	2027	55	2
9	Mohammad Mohebi	(Iran)	MF	20 December 1998 (aged 26)	Santa Clara	2023		49	12
10	Kirill Shchetinin	(Russia)	MF	17 January 2002 (aged 23)	Zenit St.Petersburg	2022		125	9
11	Aleksei Sutormin	(Russia)	MF	10 January 1994 (aged 31)	on loan from Zenit St.Petersburg	2024	2025	33	2
18	Konstantin Kuchayev	(Russia)	MF	18 March 1998 (aged 27)	Pari Nizhny Novgorod	2024		32	2
19	Khoren Bayramyan	(Armenia)	MF	7 January 1992 (aged 33)	Academy	2011		246	11
51	Aleksey Koltakov	(Russia)	MF	14 November 2005 (aged 19)	Academy	2024		11	0
53	Kirill Moiseyev	(Russia)	MF	28 May 2004 (aged 21)	Torpedo Vladimir	2021		1	0
57	Ilya Zhbanov	(Russia)	MF	25 July 2004 (aged 20)	Academy	2024		7	0
58	Daniil Shantali	(Russia)	MF	25 May 2004 (aged 21)	Academy	2022		22	0
62	Ivan Komarov	(Russia)	MF	15 April 2003 (aged 22)	Academy	2020		69	7
77	Stepan Melnikov	(Russia)	MF	25 April 2002 (aged 23)	Spartak Moscow	2022		23	2
89	Rodrigo Saravia	(Uruguay)	MF	17 August 2000 (aged 24)	Peñarol	2024		20	1
97	Ilya Zubenko	(Russia)	MF	29 May 2006 (aged 19)	Academy	2024		4	0
Forwards
7	Ronaldo	(Brazil)	FW	7 December 2000 (aged 24)	Levski Sofia	2024		51	12
27	Nikolay Komlichenko	(Russia)	FW	29 June 1995 (aged 29)	Dynamo Moscow	2022	2026	130	35
69	Yegor Golenkov	(Russia)	FW	7 July 1999 (aged 25)	Sigma Olomouc	2022	2027	124	27
73	Imran Aznaurov	(Russia)	FW	23 August 2004 (aged 20)	Academy	2024		16	0
88	Denis Titov	(Turkmenistan)	FW	6 November 2006 (aged 18)	Academy	2024		0	0
91	Anton Shamonin	(Russia)	FW	28 March 2005 (aged 20)	Academy	2024		10	0
Out on loan
28	Yevgeni Chernov	(Russia)	DF	23 October 1992 (aged 32)	Krasnodar	2023		120	3
47	Daniil Utkin	(Russia)	MF	12 October 1999 (aged 25)	Krasnodar	2022		72	4
	Dennis Hadžikadunić	(Bosnia and Herzegovina)	DF	9 July 1998 (aged 26)	Malmö FF	2018		69	3
	Igor Kalinin	(Ukraine)	DF	11 November 1995 (aged 29)	Ural Yekaterinburg	2021		15	0
	Nikita Kotin	(Russia)	DF	1 September 2002 (aged 22)	Unattached	2021		1	0
	Danila Prokhin	(Russia)	DF	24 May 2001 (aged 24)	Zenit St.Petersburg	2021		40	1
	Danila Sukhomlinov	(Russia)	MF	31 August 2002 (aged 22)	Academy	2020		27	0
	Ali Sowe	(The Gambia)	FW	14 June 1994 (aged 30)	CSKA Sofia	2021	2025	31	7
Left during the season
15	Danil Glebov	(Russia)	MF	3 November 1999 (aged 25)	Anzhi Makhachkala	2019		191	12
23	Roman Tugarev	(Russia)	MF	22 July 1998 (aged 26)	Lokomotiv Moscow	2021		73	8
64	David Semenchuk	(Russia)	DF	22 October 2004 (aged 20)	Academy	2023		10	0
	Pontus Almqvist	(Sweden)	MF	10 July 1999 (aged 25)	IFK Norrköping	2020	2025	39	3

== Transfers ==
=== In ===
Date	Position	Nationality	Name	From	Fee	Ref.
16 June 2024	GK	(Tajikistan)	Rustam Yatimov	Istiklol	Undisclosed	
20 June 2024	MF	(Russia)	Konstantin Kuchayev	Pari Nizhny Novgorod	Undisclosed	
25 June 2024	GK	(Bosnia and Herzegovina)	Hidajet Hankić	Botev Plovdiv	Undisclosed	
26 June 2024	DF	(Niger)	Oumar Sako	Arda Kardzhali	Undisclosed	
5 July 2024	MF	(Uruguay)	Rodrigo Saravia	Peñarol	Undisclosed	

=== Loans in ===
Date from	Position	Nationality	Name	From	Date to	Ref.
19 July 2024	GK	(Russia)	Daniil Odoyevsky	Zenit St.Petersburg	End of season	
15 August 2024	MF	(Russia)	Aleksei Sutormin	Zenit St.Petersburg	End of season	

=== Out ===
Date	Position	Nationality	Name	To	Fee	Ref.
14 June 2024	MF	(Norway)	Magnus Knudsen	Holstein Kiel	Undisclosed	
23 June 2024	GK	(Russia)	Nikita Medvedev	Pari Nizhny Novgorod	Undisclosed	
19 July 2024	FW	(Russia)	Maksim Turishchev	Arsenal Tula	Undisclosed	
23 July 2024	MF	(Bosnia and Herzegovina)	Armin Gigović	Holstein Kiel	Undisclosed	
13 August 2024	MF	(Sweden)	Pontus Almqvist	Parma	Undisclosed	
7 August 2024	DF	(Russia)	David Semenchuk	Arsenal Tula	Undisclosed	
14 January 2025	GK	(Russia)	Mikhail Tsulaya	Arsenal Tula	Undisclosed	
20 February 2025	MF	(Russia)	Danil Glebov	Dynamo Moscow	Undisclosed	

=== Loans out ===
Date from	Position	Nationality	Name	To	Date to	Ref.
2 July 2024	GK	(Russia)	Aleksandr Grigoryev	Leningradets Leningrad Oblast	End of season	
3 July 2024	FW	(The Gambia)	Ali Sowe	Çaykur Rizespor	End of season	
16 July 2024	DF	(Russia)	Nikita Kotin	Dynamo Makhachkala	12 February 2025	
25 July 2024	DF	(Russia)	Nikolai Poyarkov	SKA-Khabarovsk	End of season	
11 September 2024	MF	(Russia)	Daniil Utkin	Akhmat Grozny	End of season	
22 January 2025	DF	(Russia)	Yevgeni Chernov	Baltika Kaliningrad	End of season	
12 February 2025	DF	(Russia)	Nikita Kotin	Shinnik Yaroslavl	End of season	

=== Released ===
Date	Position	Nationality	Name	Joined	Date	Ref.
19 January 2025	MF	(Russia)	Roman Tugarev	Elimai	30 January 2025	

== Friendlies ==
27 June 2024	Fakel Voronezh	0–1	Rostov	Rostov-on-Don
19:00 MSK (UTC+3)		Report	Golenkov 69'	Stadium: Olimp-2

6 July 2024	Rostov	3–1	Dynamo Makhachkala	Rostov-on-Don
19:00 MSK (UTC+3)	Golenkov 74'; Aznaurov 75'; Ronaldo 77'	Report	Cacintura 48'	Stadium: Olimp-2

6 July 2024	Krasnodar	3–2	Rostov	Krasnodar
19:30 MSK (UTC+3)	Smolov 59'; Spertsyan 65'; Okoronkwo 82'	Report	Zubenko 13'; Komlichenko 78', (red card) 90+3'	Stadium: Academy Stadium

13 July 2024	Fakel Voronezh	2–2	Rostov
19:00 MSK (UTC+3)		Report

19 January 2025	Rostov	3–2	Rodina Moscow
15:15 MSK (UTC+3)	Komlichenko 49'; Osipenko 76' (pen.); Kuchayev 82'	Report	Gordyushenko 15'; Maksimenko 36'

24 January 2025	Rostov	3–0	Sogdiana
19:00 MSK (UTC+3)	Poyarkov (yellow card) 17'; Komlichenko 23' (yellow card) 38'; Mohebi 48'; Golenkov 50'; Radchenko (yellow card) 58'; Sutormin (yellow card) 86'	Report

31 January 2025	CSKA Moscow	1–0	Rostov	Abu Dhabi, United Arab Emirates
19:30 MSK (UTC+3)	Musayev 75'	Report		Stadium: Al Nahyan Stadium

7 February 2025	Rostov	1–2	Zenit St.Petersburg
15:00 MSK (UTC+3)	Shchetinin (yellow card) 30'; Radchenko 89'; Petrov (yellow card) 90+2'	Report	Akhmetov 32'; Gondou 85'

10 February 2025	Rostov	4–0	Dynamo Moscow
15:00 MSK (UTC+3)	Golenkov 7', 45+1'; Mohebi 33'; Shantaly (yellow card) 43'; Ronaldo 51'; Komlichenko (penalty missed) 78'	Report	Dasa (yellow card) 22'; Makarov (yellow card) 38'; Aleksandrov (yellow card) 66'

== Competitions ==
=== Overall record ===
Competition	First match	Last match	Starting round	Final position	Record							
Competition	First match	Last match	Starting round	Final position	Pld	W	D	L	GF	GA	GD	Win %
Premier League	20 July 2023	24 May 2025	Matchday 1	8th	30	10	9	11	41	43	−2	33.33
Russian Cup	30 July 2023	1 June 2025	Group stage	Runnersup	13	7	3	3	18	12	+6	53.85
Total					43	17	12	14	59	55	+4	39.53

Last updated: 1 June 2025
Source: Soccerway

=== Premier League ===
==== League table ====
Pos	Team	Pld	W	D	L	GF	GA	GD	Pts
6	Lokomotiv Moscow	30	15	8	7	51	41	+10	53
7	Rubin Kazan	30	13	6	11	42	45	−3	45
8	Rostov	30	10	9	11	41	43	−2	39
9	Akron Tolyatti	30	10	5	15	39	55	−16	35
10	Krylia Sovetov Samara	30	8	7	15	36	51	−15	31

Source: Premier Liga
Rules for classification: 1) Points; 2) Head-to-head points; 3) Head-to-head matches won; 4) Head-to-head goal difference; 5) Head-to-head goals scored; 6) Matches won; 7) Goal difference; 8) Goals scored; 9) 2023–24 position (not applicable to final standings); 10) Play-off. Note: if teams tied on points did not play an equal number of head-to-head games, head-to-head results are not considered for the standings.

==== Results summary ====
Overall								Home						Away					
Pld	W	D	L	GF	GA	GD	Pts	W	D	L	GF	GA	GD	W	D	L	GF	GA	GD
30	10	9	11	40	44	−4	39	5	5	5	21	18	+3	5	4	6	19	26	−7

Last updated: 24 May 2025.

==== Results by round ====
Round	1	2	3	4	5	6	7	8	9	10	11	12	13	14	15	16	17	18	19	20	21	22	23	24	25	26	27	28	29	30
Ground	H	A	A	H	H	A	H	A	H	H	A	A	H	A	H	A	H	H	H	A	H	A	H	A	A	H	A	H	A	H
Result	D	W	D	D	W	L	W	L	W	L	L	D	L	D	W	W	W	W	D	W	L	W	L	L	W	D	D	L	L	D
Position	11	4	8	9	6	8	7	7	7	8	9	8	9	10	8	8	7	7	7	8	8	7	7	8	7	8	8	8	8	8

Updated to match(es) played on 24 May 2025. Source:
A = Away; H = Home; W = Win; D = Draw; L = Loss

==== Matches ====
The match schedule was released on 20 June 2024.

20 July 2024 1	Rostov	0–0	CSKA Moscow	Rostov
20:00 MSK (UTC+3)	Komlichenko (yellow card) 20'; Utkin (yellow card) 49'; Melyokhin (yellow card) 90+1'	Report	Krugovoy (yellow card) 52'	Stadium: Rostov Arena; Attendance: 18,672; Referee: Sergei Karasev

26 July 2024 2	Krylia Sovetov Samara	1–3	Rostov	Samara
18:00 MSK (UTC+3)	Soldatenkov (yellow card) 63'; Orozco 65'; Evgenyev (yellow card) 67' (yellow-red card) 87'; Tsypchenko (yellow card) 80'	Report	Soldatenkov 44' (o.g.); Golenkov 63'; Langovich 73'; Shchetinin (yellow card) 80'; Ronaldo (yellow card) 90+3'	Stadium: Solidarnost Samara Arena; Attendance: 9,093; Referee: Yevgeni Kukulyak

3 August 2024 3	Zenit St.Petersburg	5–0	Rostov	Saint Petersburg
17:30 MSK (UTC+3)	Pedro 19'; Glushenkov 25', 35', 67'; Cassierra 32'; Nino (yellow card) 58'	Report	Glebov (yellow card) 36'	Stadium: Krestovsky Stadium; Attendance: 24,949; Referee: Vitali Meshkov

9 August 2024 4	Rostov	0–0	Rubin Kazan	Rostov
20:45 MSK (UTC+3)	Glebov 14'; Golenkov (yellow card) 29'; Langovich (yellow card) 52'	Report	Daku 62' (pen.); Iwu (yellow card) 78'; Jukić (yellow card) 85'	Stadium: Rostov Arena; Attendance: 13,000; Referee: Aleksey Sukhoi

17 August 2024 5	Rostov	3–2	Orenburg	Rostov
19:30 MSK (UTC+3)	Ronaldo (penalty missed) 33' 90+' (yellow card) 90+'; Komlichenko 51', 52'	Report	Mansilla 18' (yellow card) 32'; Pérez (yellow card) 23'; Marín 35'; Moskvichyov (yellow card) 45+'	Stadium: Rostov Arena; Attendance: 11,596; Referee: Vladislav Bezborodov

25 August 2024 6	Lokomotiv Moscow	3–2	Rostov	Moscow
20:00 MSK (UTC+3)	Batrakov 10'; Samoshnikov 37'; Tiknizyan 46'; Rakov (yellow card) 67'; Karpukas (yellow card) 72'; Sarveli (yellow card) 90+7'	Report	Ronaldo 13', 90+6'; Kuchayev (yellow card) 41'; Glebov (yellow card) 90+7'	Stadium: RZD Arena; Attendance: 8,626; Referee: Vladimir Moskalyov

1 September 2024 7	Rostov	4–1	Fakel Voronezh	Rostov
20:00 MSK (UTC+3)	Komlichenko 23'; Osipenko 45' (pen.); Ronaldo 72'; Golenkov (yellow card) 84'; El Askalany (yellow card) 90+2'	Report	Ilyin (yellow card) 45+2' (goal) 68' (pen.); Senhadji (yellow card) 57'; Appayev (yellow card) 81'; Dziov (yellow card) 88'	Stadium: Rostov Arena; Attendance: 12,734; Referee: Aleksey Sukhoi

14 September 2024 8	Krasnodar	2–0	Rostov	Krasnodar
19:00 MSK (UTC+3)	Spertsyan 16', 76'; González (yellow card) 87'	Report	Saravia (yellow card) 44'; Langovich (yellow card) 70'; Sutormin (yellow card) 72'; Shchetinin (yellow card) 75'	Stadium: Krasnodar Stadium; Attendance: 32,316; Referee: Vasily Kazartsev

22 September 2024 9	Rostov	0–0	Dynamo Makhachkala	Rostov
16:30 MSK (UTC+3)		Report	Yusupov (yellow card) 1'; Gadzhiyev (yellow card) 67'; Tabidze (yellow card) 71'	Stadium: Rostov Arena; Attendance: 13,025; Referee: Sergei Karasev

28 September 2024 10	Rostov	0–2	Akron Tolyatti	Rostov-on-Don
20:00 MSK (UTC+3)	Mohebi (yellow card) 69'	Report	Benchimol 5'; Dzyuba 32'	Stadium: Rostov Arena; Attendance: 11,510; Referee: Ivan Abrosimov

5 October 2024 11	Spartak Moscow	3–0	Rostov	Moscow
19:00 MSK (UTC+3)	Denisov (yellow card) 11'; Umyarov 29'; Nicholson 34', 45+' (yellow card) 37'; Litvinov (yellow card) 74'	Report	Langovich (yellow card) 21'	Stadium: Lukoil Arena; Attendance: 14,695; Referee: Pavel Kukuyan

19 October 2024 12	Pari NN	1–1	Rostov	Nizhny Novgorod
14:00 MSK (UTC+3)	Troshechkin (yellow card) 71'; Tsarukyan 75'; Tičić (yellow card) 85'; Kalinsky (yellow card) 90+'	Report	Bayramyan (yellow card) 8'; Chernov (yellow card) 28'; Osipenko 90+' (pen.)	Stadium: Nizhny Novgorod Stadium; Attendance: 5,878; Referee: Vitali Meshkov

26 October 2024 13	Rostov	2–3	Akhmat Grozny	Rostov-on-Don
19:00 MSK (UTC+3)	Komlichenko 24'; Glebov (yellow card) 60'; Mohebi 69'; Vakhaniya (yellow card) 70'; Sako (yellow card) 82'	Report	Utkin 33'; Sadulayev 36', 51'; Kamilov (yellow card) 82'	Stadium: Rostov Arena; Attendance: 8,356; Referee: Aleksey Sukhoi

1 November 2024 14	Dynamo Moscow	1–1	Rostov	Moscow
19:00 MSK (UTC+3)	Kutitsky 26'	Report	Komlichenko 24'; Vakhaniya (yellow card) 71'; Komarov (yellow card) 80'	Stadium: VTB Arena; Attendance: 9,029; Referee: Kirill Levnikov

9 November 2024 15	Rostov	3–1	Khimki	Rostov-on-Don
19:00 MSK (UTC+3)	Komarov 6', 75'; Osipenko 67' (pen.); Golenkov (yellow card) 90+'	Report	Zabolotny (yellow card) 75'; Mirzov 87' (pen.)	Stadium: Rostov Arena; Attendance: 7,966; Referee: Roman Safyan

23 November 2024 16	CSKA Moscow	1–2	Rostov	Moscow
14:15 MSK (UTC+3)	Khellven 4'; Krugovoy (yellow card) 48'; Zdjelar (yellow card) 90+'	Report	Kuchayev (yellow card) 70'; Golenkov 77', 90' (yellow card) 90+'	Stadium: VTB Arena; Attendance: 6,751; Referee: Pavel Kukuyan

30 November 2024 17	Rostov	4–0	Pari NN	Rostov-on-Don
19:00 MSK (UTC+3)	Ronaldo (yellow card) 11'; Osipenko 32', 65'; Melyokhin (yellow card) 43'; Saravia 60'; Komlichenko 73' (pen.)	Report	Kalinsky (yellow card) 6'; Ektov (yellow card) 34'; Kakkoyev (yellow card) 41'; Boselli (red card) 49'; Tičić (yellow card) 56'	Stadium: Rostov Arena; Attendance: 6,545; Referee: Yan Bobrovsky

7 December 2024 18	Rostov	3–1	Krylia Sovetov Samara	Rostov-on-Don
16:30 MSK (UTC+3)	Langovich (yellow card) 22'; Oroz 38' (o.g.); Vakhaniya (yellow card) 40'; Mohebi 50'; Osipenko 73' (pen.); Komarov (yellow card) 83'	Report	Pyachenin (yellow card) 25'; Oleynikov 32'; Rasskazov (yellow card) 32'; Garré (yellow card) 52'; Oroz (yellow card) 72' (yellow-red card) 81'	Stadium: Rostov Arena; Attendance: 8,434; Referee: Vitali Meshkov

2 March 2025 19	Rostov	1–1	Dynamo Moscow	Rostov-on-Don
19:30 MSK (UTC+3)	Mohebi 83'	Report	Maouhoub (yellow card) 65'; Fomin 77'	Stadium: Rostov Arena; Attendance: 8,276; Referee: Kirill Levnikov

8 March 2025 20	Orenburg	1–2	Rostov	Orenburg
12:00 MSK (UTC+3)	Marín (yellow card) 15'; Malykh (yellow card) 21'; Saharkhizan (yellow card) 66'; Savelyev (yellow card) 87'; Khotulyov (yellow card) 90+'	Report	Osipenko 22'; Komlichenko 70'	Stadium: Gazovik Stadium; Attendance: 2,464; Referee: Yan Bobrovsky

16 March 2025 21	Rostov	0–1	Krasnodar	Rostov-on-Don
17:00 MSK (UTC+3)	Sutormin (yellow card) 57'; Osipenko (yellow card) 73'; Sako (yellow card) 90+1'; Melyokhin (yellow card) 90+2'	Report	Chernikov (yellow card) 52'; Cobnan (yellow card) 74' (goal) 78'; Córdoba (yellow card) 87'; Agkatsev (yellow card) 90+7'	Stadium: Rostov Arena; Attendance: 22,123; Referee: Pavel Kukuyan

31 March 2025 22	Akron Tolyatti	2–3	Rostov	Samara
18:30 MSK (UTC+3)	Bokoyev 32'; Đakovac 89'	Report	Osipenko (penalty missed) 41' 44'; Mohebi 62' (yellow card) 90+'; Sako 87'	Stadium: Solidarnost Samara Arena; Attendance: 2,785; Referee: Pavel Shadykhanov

6 April 2025 23	Rostov	0–3	Spartak Moscow	Rostov-on-Don
16:30 MSK (UTC+3)	Sutormin (red card) 45+'; Komlichenko (yellow card) 45+'; Melyokhin (yellow card) 62'	Report	Solari (yellow card) 62'; Umyarov 65'; Martins 68'; Barco 88'	Stadium: Rostov Arena; Attendance: 29,122; Referee: Vladimir Moskalyov

12 April 2025 24	Akhmat Grozny	2–1	Rostov	Grozny
19:30 MSK (UTC+3)	Kamilov (yellow card) 23'; Ghandri 51'; Samorodov 67'	Report	Vakhaniya (yellow card) 41'; Sako (yellow card) 43'; Komlichenko 75'; Komarov (yellow card) 90+'	Stadium: Akhmat-Arena; Attendance: 4,628; Referee: Yan Bobrovsky

20 April 2025 25	Fakel Voronezh	0–2	Rostov	Voronezh
14:00 MSK (UTC+3)	Mertens (yellow card) 43'; Brahimi (yellow card) 45+'; Yurganov (yellow card) 61'	Report	Golenkov 30' (yellow card) 45+'; Komarov (yellow card) 45+'; Bayramyan (yellow card) 56'; Kuchayev 77'; Sako (yellow card) 86'	Stadium: Fakel Stadium; Attendance: 7,624; Referee: Evgeniy Bulanov

26 April 2025 26	Rostov	1–1	Lokomotiv Moscow	Rostov-on-Don
16:30 MSK (UTC+3)	Shchetinin 23'; Shantaly (yellow card) 60'; Ronaldo (yellow card) 79'	Report	Batrakov 75' (pen.); Pogostnov (yellow card) 82'	Stadium: Rostov Arena; Attendance: 16,046; Referee: Sergei Karasev

4 May 2025 27	Khimki	1–1	Rostov	Khimki
19:30 MSK (UTC+3)	Bakayev (yellow card) 14'; Vera (yellow card) 45+' (penalty missed) 58' 70'	Report	Bayramyan (yellow card) 5'; Osipenko 89'	Stadium: Arena Khimki; Attendance: 1,341; Referee: Sergey Cheban

11 May 2025 28	Rubin Kazan	1–0	Rostov	Kazan
19:30 MSK (UTC+3)	Hodža (yellow card) 67'; Daku 90' (yellow card) 90+'	Report	Sako (yellow card) 35'; Shantaly (yellow card) 60'; Shamonin (yellow card) 86'	Stadium: Ak Bars Arena; Attendance: 10,634; Referee: Egor Egorov

18 May 2025 29	Rostov	0–1	Zenit St.Petersburg	Rostov-on-Don
19:00 MSK (UTC+3)	Ignatov (yellow card) 28'; Shamonin (yellow card) 51'; Langovich (yellow card) 55'; Koltakov (yellow card) 59'; Osipenko (yellow card) 90+'	Report	Sobolev 30'; Barrios (yellow card) 90+'	Stadium: Rostov Arena; Attendance: 28,315; Referee: Evgeniy Kukulyak

24 May 2025 30	Dynamo Makhachkala	1–1	Rostov	Kaspiysk
16:30 MSK (UTC+3)	Glushkov (yellow card) 41'; Cacintura 45' (red card) 62'	Report	Sako (yellow card) 35' (yellow-red card) 86'; Komarov 73'	Stadium: Anzhi Arena; Attendance: 7,063; Referee: Pavel Kukuyan

=== Russian Cup ===
==== Group stage ====
Pos	Team	Pld	W	PW	PL	L	GF	GA	GD	Pts	Qualification
1	Lokomotiv Moscow	6	5	1	0	0	17	6	+11	17	Qualification to the Knockout phase (RPL path)
2	Rostov	6	3	0	2	1	11	7	+4	11	Qualification to the Knockout phase (RPL path)
3	Khimki	6	1	1	0	4	5	16	−11	5	Qualification to the Knockout phase (regions path)
4	Orenburg	6	1	0	0	5	6	10	−4	3	

Source: Russian Football Union (in Russian), Soccerway
Rules for classification: 1) Points; 2) Head-to-head points; 3) Head-to-head matches won; 4) Head-to-head goal difference; 5) Head-to-head goals scored; 6) Matches won; 7) Goal difference; 8) Goals scored; 9) Penalty shoot-out goal difference; 10) Draw.

30 July 2024 1	Lokomotiv Moscow	1–0	Rostov	Moscow
18:30 MSK (UTC+3)	Karpukas (yellow card) 11'; Rakov 78'	Report	Melyokhin (yellow card) 10'	Stadium: RZD Arena; Attendance: 11,250; Referee: Ranel Ziyakov

13 August 2024 2	Rostov	3–1	Khimki	Rostov
20:00 MSK (UTC+3)	Kuchayev 8'; Melyokhin (yellow card) 12'; Bayramyan (yellow card) 25'; Ronaldo 38'; Golenkov (yellow card) 84' (goal) 88'; Sako (yellow card) 85'	Report	Khosonov (yellow card) 28'; Zabolotny (yellow card) 43'; Bakayev 45+2'; Mirzov (yellow card) 85'	Stadium: Rostov Arena; Attendance: 14,352; Referee: Roman Safyan

28 August 2024 3	Orenburg	0–1	Rostov	Orenburg
15:00 MSK (UTC+3)	Prokhin (yellow card) 66'; Pérez (yellow card) 86'	Report	Ignatov (yellow card) 38'; Golenkov 83'; Utkin (yellow card) 87'	Stadium: Gazovik Stadium; Attendance: 3,650; Referee: Evgeniy Kukulyak

18 September 2024 4	Rostov	3–1	Orenburg	Rostov
17:00 MSK (UTC+3)	Golenkov 35'; Sutormin 62'; Ignatov (yellow card) 77'; Ronaldo 86'	Report	Marín 14' (pen.); Muro (yellow card) 16'; Khotulyov (yellow card) 67'	Stadium: Rostov Arena; Attendance: 24,010; Referee: Yan Bobrovsky

2 October 2024 5	Khimki	2–2 (8–7 p)	Rostov	Khimki
17:00 MSK (UTC+3)	Rudenko 81' (yellow card) 90+4'; Melentijević 88' (yellow card) 90+4'	Report	Langovich 44'; Sako (yellow card) 56'; Mohebi (yellow card) 69' (goal) 76'	Stadium: Arena Khimki; Attendance: 1,307; Referee: Evgeniy Bulanov
	Penalties
	Panchenko (penalty scored); Mejía (penalty scored); Rudenko (penalty scored); Zabolotny (penalty missed); Mirzov (penalty scored); Abdullahi (penalty scored); Fernández (penalty scored); Stepanov (penalty scored); Melentijević (penalty scored)		(penalty scored) Komlichenko; (penalty scored) Sako; (penalty missed) Komarov; (penalty scored) Langovich; (penalty scored) Mohebi; (penalty scored) Kuchayev; (penalty scored) Shchetinin; (penalty scored) Shantali; (penalty missed) Chernov

23 October 2024 6	Rostov	2–2 (7–8 p)	Lokomotiv Moscow	Rostov
17:00 MSK (UTC+3)	Saravia (yellow card) 16'; Komarov 19'; Sutormin (yellow card) 45' (penalty missed) 90+3' 90+3'	Report	Batrakov 16' (pen.); Morozov (yellow card) 40'; Nyamsi (yellow card) 90+1'; Sarveli 90+6'	Stadium: Rostov Arena; Attendance: 22,2023; Referee: Egor Egorov
	Penalties
	Komlichenko (penalty scored); Sutormin (penalty missed); Osipenko (penalty scored); Ignatov (penalty scored); Mohebi (penalty scored); Langovich (penalty scored); Kuchayev (penalty scored); Shchetinin (penalty scored); Vakhaniya (penalty scored); Shantali (penalty missed)		(penalty scored) Suleymanov; (penalty missed) Silyanov; (penalty scored) Sarveli; (penalty scored) Nyamsi; (penalty scored) Rakov; (penalty scored) Morozov; (penalty scored) Timofeyev; (penalty scored) Nenakhov; (penalty scored) Samoshnikov; (penalty scored) Barinov

==== Knockout phase ====
5 November 2024 RPL path Quarterfinals 1st leg	Spartak Moscow	0–1	Rostov	Moscow
18:30 MSK (UTC+3)	Litvinov (yellow card) 9'; Barco (penalty missed) 44'; Umyarov (yellow card) 70'; Reabciuk (red card) 86'	Report	Zhbanov (yellow card) 16'; Melyokhin (yellow card) 43'; Shchetinin (yellow card) 45+2'; Mohebi 71' (pen.); Komarov (yellow card) 90+3'	Stadium: Lukoil Arena; Attendance: 9,393; Referee: Vasily Kazartsev

27 November 2024 RPL path Quarterfinals 2nd leg	Rostov	2–1 (3–1 agg.)	Spartak Moscow	Rostov
20:30 MSK (UTC+3)	Golenkov 19'; Melyokhin 31'; Kuchayev (yellow card) 57'; Shchetinin (yellow card) 75'	Report	Zorin (yellow card) 41'; Martins 55'; Umyarov (yellow card) 85'; Marquinhos (yellow card) 90+2'	Stadium: Rostov Arena; Attendance: 26,990; Referee: Sergei Karasev

12 March 2025 RPL path Semifinals 1st leg	Rostov	0–1	Zenit St.Petersburg	Rostov-on-Don
18:15 MSK (UTC+3)	Poyarkov (yellow card) 55'; Mohebi (yellow card) 90'	Report	Luiz Henrique (yellow card) 55'; Cassierra 79'; Barrios (yellow card) 90'	Stadium: Rostov Arena; Attendance: 27,895; Referee: Aleksey Sukhoy

16 April 2025 RPL path Semifinals 2nd leg	Zenit St.Petersburg	2–0 (3–0 agg.)	Rostov	Saint Petersburg
18:00 MSK (UTC+3)	Sobolev 57'; Cassierra 64'	Report	Sako (yellow card) 62'	Stadium: Krestovsky Stadium; Attendance: 32,050; Referee: Vitali Meshkov

30 April 2025 Regions path Semi-finals Stage 2	Lokomotiv Moscow	0–2	Rostov	Moscow
18:00 MSK (UTC+3)	Tiknizyan (yellow card) 4'; Rakov (yellow card) 49'; Suleymanov (yellow card) 68'; Godyayev (yellow card) 72'; Samoshnikov (yellow card) 76'	Report	Shchetinin (yellow card) 3'; Osipenko 27' (pen.); Kuchayev (yellow card) 59'; Shantaly (yellow card) 79'; Golenkov 87'	Stadium: RZhD Arena; Attendance: 11,721; Referee: Vladimir Moskalyov

15 May 2025 Regions path Final	Spartak Moscow	1–2	Rostov	Moscow
20:00 MSK (UTC+3)	García 76'; Ugalde (yellow card) 47' (yellow-red card) 84'; Babić (yellow card) 90'; Umyarov (red card) 90+5'	Report	Ignatov (yellow card) 13'; Maksimenko 31' (o.g.); Komarov (yellow card) 69'; Komlichenko 78'; Bayramyan (yellow card) 90'; Yatimov (yellow card) 90+3'	Stadium: Lukoil Arena; Attendance: 36,085; Referee: Kirill Levnikov

1 June 2025 Final	Rostov	0–0 (3–4 p)	CSKA Moscow	Moscow
18:00 MSK (UTC+3)	Melyokhin (yellow card) 45+5'; Sako (yellow card) 58'; Shchetinin (yellow card) 82'	Report		Stadium: Luzhniki Stadium; Attendance: 57,176; Referee: Kirill Levnikov
	Penalties
	Bayramyan (penalty missed); Komlichenko (penalty scored); Sutormin (penalty missed); Sako (penalty scored); Osipenko (penalty scored)		(penalty scored) Pjanić; (penalty missed) Diveyev; (penalty scored) Oblyakov; (penalty scored) Kislyak; (penalty scored) Gajić

== Squad statistics ==
As of match played 1 June 2025

=== Appearances and goals ===
No.	Pos	Nat	Player	Total		Premier League		Russian Cup	
No.	Pos	Nat	Player	Apps	Goals	Apps	Goals	Apps	Goals
1	GK	(Tajikistan) TJK	Rustam Yatimov	28	0	20	0	8	0
3	DF	(Niger) NIG	Oumar Sako	39	1	22+6	1	6+5	0
4	DF	(Russia) RUS	Viktor Melyokhin	26	1	8+7	0	9+2	1
5	DF	(Russia) RUS	Nikolai Poyarkov	3	0	1+1	0	1	0
7	FW	(Brazil) BRA	Ronaldo	36	6	27+2	4	6+1	2
8	MF	(Russia) RUS	Aleksei Mironov	3	0	0+2	0	0+1	0
9	MF	(Iran) IRI	Mohammad Mohebi	20	6	12+3	4	1+4	2
10	MF	(Russia) RUS	Kirill Shchetinin	40	1	17+11	1	8+4	0
11	MF	(Russia) RUS	Aleksei Sutormin	33	2	14+10	0	7+2	2
13	GK	(Bosnia and Herzegovina) BIH	Hidajet Hankić	3	0	2	0	1	0
18	MF	(Russia) RUS	Konstantin Kuchayev	32	2	13+8	1	11	1
19	MF	(Armenia) ARM	Khoren Bayramyan	36	0	6+19	0	8+3	0
27	FW	(Russia) RUS	Nikolay Komlichenko	37	9	22+4	8	6+5	1
34	DF	(Egypt) EGY	Eyad El Askalany	3	0	0+2	0	1	0
39	DF	(Russia) RUS	Maksim Radchenko	1	0	1	0	0	0
40	DF	(Russia) RUS	Ilya Vakhaniya	42	0	26+3	0	8+5	0
51	MF	(Russia) RUS	Aleksey Koltakov	2	0	1	0	1	0
55	DF	(Russia) RUS	Maksim Osipenko	40	10	28+2	9	7+3	1
57	MF	(Russia) RUS	Ilya Zhbanov	7	0	0+3	0	4	0
58	MF	(Russia) RUS	Daniil Shantali	20	0	11+1	0	8	0
62	MF	(Russia) RUS	Ivan Komarov	28	4	14+5	3	3+6	1
67	DF	(Russia) RUS	German Ignatov	16	0	6+4	0	6	0
69	FW	(Russia) RUS	Yegor Golenkov	36	10	10+15	5	8+3	5
71	GK	(Russia) RUS	Daniil Odoyevsky	13	0	8+1	0	4	0
73	FW	(Russia) RUS	Imran Aznaurov	10	0	5+1	0	1+3	0
87	DF	(Russia) RUS	Andrei Langovich	33	2	20+3	1	3+7	1
89	MF	(Uruguay) URU	Rodrigo Saravia	20	1	11+4	1	3+2	0
91	FW	(Russia) RUS	Anton Shamonin	9	0	1+5	0	2+1	0
97	MF	(Russia) RUS	Ilya Zubenko	2	0	0	0	1+1	0
Players away from the club on loan:
28	DF	(Russia) RUS	Yevgeni Chernov	9	0	2+3	0	4	0
47	MF	(Russia) RUS	Daniil Utkin	7	0	5	0	1+1	0
Players who appeared for Rostov but left during the season:
15	MF	(Russia) RUS	Danil Glebov	23	1	17	1	5+1	0
64	DF	(Russia) RUS	David Semenchuk	1	0	0	0	1	0

=== Goal scorers ===
Place	Position	Nation	Number	Name	Premier League	Russian Cup	Total
1	DF	(Russia)	55	Maksim Osipenko	9	1	10
1	FW	(Russia)	69	Yegor Golenkov	5	5	10
3	FW	(Russia)	27	Nikolay Komlichenko	8	1	9
4	FW	(Brazil)	7	Ronaldo	4	2	6
4	MF	(Iran)	9	Mohammad Mohebi	4	2	6
6	MF	(Russia)	62	Ivan Komarov	3	1	4
7				Own goal	2	1	3
8	DF	(Russia)	87	Andrei Langovich	1	1	2
8	MF	(Russia)	18	Konstantin Kuchayev	1	1	2
8	MF	(Russia)	11	Aleksei Sutormin	0	2	2
11	MF	(Uruguay)	89	Rodrigo Saravia	1	0	1
11	MF	(Russia)	15	Danil Glebov	1	0	1
11	DF	(Niger)	3	Oumar Sako	1	0	1
11	MF	(Russia)	10	Kirill Shchetinin	1	0	1
11	DF	(Russia)	4	Viktor Melyokhin	0	1	1
Total					41	18	58

=== Clean sheets ===
Place	Position	Nation	Number	Name	Premier League	Russian Cup	Total
1	GK	(Tajikistan)	1	Rustam Yatimov	3	3	6
2	GK	(Russia)	71	Daniil Odoyevsky	3	0	3
Total					5	3	8

Rustam Yatimov & Daniil Odoyevsky both played in Rostov's 2-0 victory over Fakel Voronezh on 20 April 2025

=== Disciplinary record ===
Number	Nation	Position	Name	Premier League		Russian Cup		Total	
Number	Nation	Position	Name	Yellow card	Red card	Yellow card	Red card	Yellow card	Red card
1	(Tajikistan)	GK	Rustam Yatimov	0	0	1	0	1	0
3	(Niger)	DF	Oumar Sako	7	1	4	0	11	1
4	(Russia)	DF	Viktor Melyokhin	4	0	4	0	8	0
5	(Russia)	DF	Nikolai Poyarkov	0	0	1	0	1	0
7	(Brazil)	FW	Ronaldo	4	0	0	0	4	0
9	(Iran)	MF	Mohammad Mohebi	2	0	2	0	4	0
10	(Russia)	MF	Kirill Shchetinin	2	0	4	0	6	0
11	(Russia)	MF	Aleksei Sutormin	2	1	1	0	3	1
18	(Russia)	MF	Konstantin Kuchayev	2	0	2	0	4	0
19	(Armenia)	MF	Khoren Bayramyan	3	0	2	0	5	0
27	(Russia)	FW	Nikolay Komlichenko	2	0	0	0	2	0
34	(Egypt)	DF	Eyad El Askalany	1	0	0	0	1	0
40	(Russia)	DF	Ilya Vakhaniya	4	0	0	0	4	0
51	(Russia)	MF	Aleksey Koltakov	1	0	0	0	1	0
55	(Russia)	DF	Maksim Osipenko	2	0	0	0	2	0
57	(Russia)	MF	Ilya Zhbanov	0	0	1	0	1	0
58	(Russia)	MF	Daniil Shantali	2	0	1	0	3	0
62	(Russia)	MF	Ivan Komarov	4	0	2	0	6	0
67	(Russia)	DF	German Ignatov	1	0	3	0	4	0
69	(Russia)	FW	Yegor Golenkov	4	0	1	0	5	0
87	(Russia)	DF	Andrei Langovich	5	0	0	0	5	0
89	(Uruguay)	MF	Rodrigo Saravia	1	0	1	0	2	0
91	(Russia)	FW	Anton Shamonin	2	0	0	0	2	0
Players away on loan:
28	(Russia)	DF	Yevgeni Chernov	1	0	0	0	1	0
47	(Russia)	MF	Daniil Utkin	1	0	1	0	2	0
Players who left Rostov during the season:
15	(Russia)	MF	Danil Glebov	4	0	0	0	4	0
Total				61	2	31	0	92	2
