= Nikita Babakin =

Russian footballer (born 2006)

Personal information
- Full name: Nikita Gennadyevich Babakin
- Date of birth: 5 January 2006 (age 20)
- Place of birth: Engels, Russia
- Height: 1.87 m (6 ft 2 in)
- Positions: Centre-back; right-back

Team information
- Current team: Rostov/ Rostov-2
- Number: 59

Youth career
- –2022: Konoplyov football academy
- 2022–2025: Rostov

Senior career*
Years	Team	Apps	(Gls)
2025–	Rostov-2	30	(2)
2025–	Rostov	1	(0)

International career^{‡}
2024	Russia U19	3	(0)
2025	Russia U20	2	(0)
2025–	Russia U21	6	(0)
- * Club domestic league appearances and goals as of 31 October 2026 ‡ National team caps and goals as of 9 June 2026

Nikita Gennadyevich Babakin (Russian: Никита Геннадьевич Бабакин; born 5 January 2006) is a Russian football player who plays as a centre-back or right-back for Rostov and Rostov-2.

== Career ==
Babakin finished his youth career with Rostov and made his senior debut for their reserve team in the fourth-tier Russian Second League Division B in 2025.

He made his debut for Rostov's senior team on 14 August 2025 in a Russian Cup game against Pari NN. Babakin made his debut in the Russian Premier League for Rostov on 13 September 2026 in a game against Spartak Moscow.

== Career statistics ==
As of 31 October 2026

Club	Season	League			Cup		Total	
Club	Season	Division	Apps	Goals	Apps	Goals	Apps	Goals
Rostov-2	2025	Russian Second League B	15	0	—		15	0
Rostov-2	2026	Russian Second League B	15	2	—		15	2
Rostov-2	Total		30	2	0	0	30	2
Rostov	2024–25	Russian Premier League	0	0	0	0	0	0
Rostov	2025–26	Russian Premier League	0	0	1	0	1	0
Rostov	2026–27	Russian Premier League	1	0	3	0	4	0
Rostov	Total		1	0	4	0	5	0
Career total			31	2	4	0	35	2
