= German Ignatov =

Russian footballer (born 2005)

Personal information
- Full name: German Vladimirovich Ignatov
- Date of birth: 11 August 2005 (age 21)
- Place of birth: Rostov-on-Don, Russia
- Height: 1.80 m (5 ft 11 in)
- Positions: Left-back; centre-back

Team information
- Current team: Rostov
- Number: 67

Youth career
- 2012–2023: Rostov

Senior career*
Years	Team	Apps	(Gls)
2023–	Rostov	20	(0)
2024–2025	Rostov-2	20	(2)

International career^{‡}
2023	Russia U-19	1	(1)
2023–	Russia U-21	3	(0)
- * Club domestic league appearances and goals as of 26 July 2026 ‡ National team caps and goals as of 8 June 2025

German Vladimirovich Ignatov (Russian: Герман Владимирович Игнатов; born 11 August 2005) is a Russian football player who plays as a left-back or centre-back for Rostov. He can also play as a left midfielder.

== Career ==
Ignatov signed his first professional contract with Rostov in May 2022. Ignatov made his debut for Rostov on 20 September 2023 in a Russian Cup game against Rubin Kazan and scored on his debut in a 1–1 draw. He also scored a winning penalty kick in the subsequent shoot-out.

Ignatov made his Russian Premier League debut for Rostov on 17 August 2024 against Orenburg.

== Career statistics ==
As of match played 26 July 2026

Appearances and goals by club, season and competition
Club	Season	League			Russian Cup		Total	
Club	Season	Division	Apps	Goals	Apps	Goals	Apps	Goals
Rostov	2023–24	Russian Premier League	0	0	3	1	3	1
Rostov	2024–25	Russian Premier League	10	0	6	0	16	0
Rostov	2025–26	Russian Premier League	9	0	4	1	13	1
Rostov	2026–27	Russian Premier League	1	0	0	0	1	0
Rostov	Total		20	0	13	2	33	2
Rostov-2	2024	Russian Second League B	12	2	—		12	2
Rostov-2	2025	Russian Second League B	8	0	—		8	0
Rostov-2	Total		20	2	—		20	2
Career total			40	2	13	2	53	4
