= Rodrigo Saravia (footballer, born 2000) =

Uruguayan footballer (born 2000)

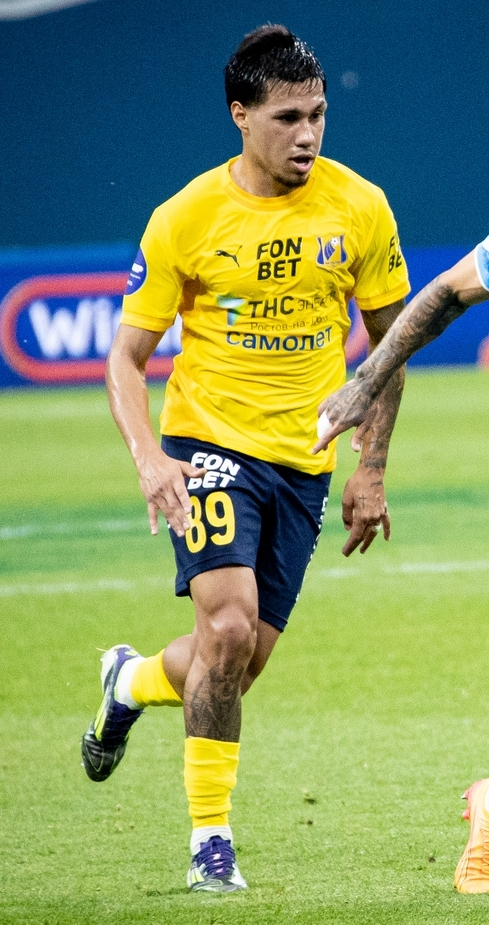
- Saravia with Rostov in 2024

Personal information
- Full name: Rodrigo Agustín Saravia Salvia
- Date of birth: 17 August 2000 (age 26)
- Place of birth: Montevideo, Uruguay
- Height: 1.73 m (5 ft 8 in)
- Position: Midfielder

Team information
- Current team: Ponte Preta

Youth career
- Peñarol

Senior career*
Years	Team	Apps	(Gls)
2021–2024	Peñarol	46	(3)
2021	→ Racing Montevideo (loan)	10	(0)
2023–2024	→ Gimnasia LP (loan)	31	(1)
2024–2025	Rostov	15	(1)
2025–2026	Belgrano	7	(0)
2026–	Ponte Preta	0	(0)
- * Club domestic league appearances and goals as of 22:43, 11 March 2026 (UTC)

Rodrigo Agustin Saravia Salvia (born 17 August 2000) is a Uruguayan professional footballer who plays as a midfielder for Brazilian club Ponte Preta.

== Career ==
Saravia is a youth academy graduate of Peñarol. In August 2021, he joined Racing Montevideo on loan until the end of the season. He made his professional debut on 16 September 2021 in a 2–1 league win against Uruguay Montevideo.

On 5 July 2024, Saravia joined Russian Premier League club Rostov.

On 17 July 2025, Saravia signed a one-and-a-half year contract with Belgrano in Argentina.

== Career statistics ==
As of 30 November 2024

Appearances and goals by club, season and competition
Club	Season	League			Cup (Note: Includes Copa Uruguay, Russian Cup)		Continental		Other		Total	
Club	Season	Division	Apps	Goals	Apps	Goals	Apps	Goals	Apps	Goals	Apps	Goals
Racing Montevideo (loan)	2021	Uruguayan Segunda División	10	0	—		—		2 (Note: Appearances in Championship play-offs.)	0	12	0
Peñarol	2022	Uruguayan Primera División	26	2	4	0	5 (Note: Appearances in Copa Libertadores.)	0	1 (Note: Appearance in Supercopa Uruguaya.)	0	36	2
Peñarol	2023	Uruguayan Primera División	20	1	—		5 (Note: Appearances in Copa Sudamericana.)	0	—		25	1
Peñarol	Total		46	3	4	0	10	0	1	0	61	3
Gimnasia LP (loan)	2024	Argentine Primera División	5	0	2	0	—		26 (Note: Twenty-five appearances, one goal in Copa de la Liga Profesional, one appearance in relegation play-offs of the same. Soccerway counts those games as league games.)	1	33	1
Rostov	2024–25	Russian Premier League	15	1	5	0	—		—		20	1
Career total			76	4	11	0	10	0	29	1	126	5

== Honours ==
Peñarol

- Supercopa Uruguaya: 2022
