= Ilya Zhbanov =

Russian footballer

Personal information
- Full name: Ilya Dmitriyevich Zhbanov
- Date of birth: 25 July 2004 (age 22)
- Place of birth: Bobrovka, Kinelsky District, Samara Oblast, Russia
- Height: 1.87 m (6 ft 2 in)
- Position: Left-back

Team information
- Current team: Rostov
- Number: 57

Youth career
- –2017: Krylia Sovetov Samara
- 2017–2018: Konoplyov football academy
- 2018–2020: Krylia Sovetov Samara
- 2020–2022: Master-Saturn
- 2022–2023: Rostov

Senior career*
Years	Team	Apps	(Gls)
2024–	Rostov	8	(0)
2024–2025	→ Rostov-2	20	(0)
- * Club domestic league appearances and goals as of 22 November 2025

Ilya Dmitriyevich Zhbanov (Russian: Илья Дмитриевич Жбанов; born 25 July 2004) is a Russian football player who plays as a left back for Rostov.

== Career ==
Zhbanov made his debut for the main squad of Rostov on 30 July 2024 in a Russian Cup game against Lokomotiv Moscow. He made his Russian Premier League debut for Rostov on 9 November 2024 against Khimki.

== Career statistics ==
As of match played 18 August 2026

Appearances and goals by club, season and competition
Club	Season	League			Cup		Total	
Club	Season	Division	Apps	Goals	Apps	Goals	Apps	Goals
Rostov-2	2024	Russian Second League B	16	0	—		16	0
Rostov-2	2025	Russian Second League B	4	0	—		4	0
Rostov-2	Total		20	0	0	0	20	0
Rostov	2024–25	Russian Premier League	3	0	4	0	7	0
Rostov	2025–26	Russian Premier League	5	0	5	0	10	0
Rostov	2026–27	Russian Premier League	0	0	2	0	2	0
Rostov	Total		8	0	11	0	19	0
Career total			28	0	11	0	39	0
