= Aleksei Yedunov =

Russian footballer

Personal information
- Full name: Aleksei Vladimirovich Yedunov
- Date of birth: 11 March 1986 (age 40)
- Place of birth: Moscow, Russian SFSR
- Height: 1.85 m (6 ft 1 in)
- Positions: Midfielder; forward

Team information
- Current team: Rostov-2 (manager)

Youth career
- SDYuSShOR-63 Smena Moscow
- Spartak Moscow

Senior career*
Years	Team	Apps	(Gls)
2004	Shinnik Yaroslavl	0	(0)
2004	Biokhimik-Mordovia	0	(0)
2005	Nara-Desna	1	(0)
2006–2007	Anzhi Makhachkala	62	(4)
2008	Spartak Trnava	0	(0)
2009	Chernomorets Novorossiysk	17	(1)
2009	Nosta Novotroitsk	8	(1)
2010	Lokomotiv-2 Moscow	4	(0)
2011	Dynamo Stavropol	23	(5)
2012	Hradec Králové	8	(0)
2013–2015	Sibir Novosibirsk	45	(1)

Managerial career
- 2022–2024: Rostov (U16)
- 2024: Rostov (U19 assistant)
- 2025–2026: Rostov (U19)
- 2026–: Rostov-2
- * Club domestic league appearances and goals

Aleksei Vladimirovich Yedunov (Russian: Алексей Владимирович Едунов; born 11 March 1986) is a Russian professional football coach and a former player who is the manager of Rostov-2.

== Club career ==
He made his Russian Football National League debut for Anzhi Makhachkala on 26 March 2006 in a game against KAMAZ. Overall, he played 5 seasons in the FNL for Anzhi, Chernomorets Novorossiysk, Nosta Novotroitsk and Sibir Novosibirsk.
