= Anton Shamonin =

Russian footballer (born 2005)

Personal information
- Full name: Anton Alekseyevich Shamonin
- Date of birth: 28 March 2005 (age 21)
- Place of birth: Engels, Saratov Oblast, Russia
- Height: 1.94 m (6 ft 4 in)
- Position: Centre-forward

Team information
- Current team: Rostov
- Number: 91

Youth career
- –2016: DYuSSh Yunost Engels
- 2016: Chertanovo
- 2017: DYuSSh Yunost Engels
- 2017–2021: Strogino Moscow
- 2021: DYuSSh Yunost Engels
- 2022–2023: Master-Saturn
- 2023: Rostov

Senior career*
Years	Team	Apps	(Gls)
2024–	Rostov	26	(0)
2024–2025	→ Rostov-2	34	(11)

International career^{‡}
2023	Russia U-19	2	(0)
2023–	Russia U-21	4	(3)
- * Club domestic league appearances and goals as of 20 November 2026 ‡ National team caps and goals as of 8 June 2025

Anton Alekseyevich Shamonin (Russian: Антон Алексеевич Шамонин; born 28 March 2005) is a Russian football player who plays as a centre-forward for Rostov.

== Career ==
Shamonin made his debut for Rostov on 17 April 2024 in a Russian Cup game against Ural Yekaterinburg. He made his Russian Premier League debut for Rostov on 14 September 2024 against Krasnodar.

== Career statistics ==
As of match played 20 November 2026

Appearances and goals by club, season and competition
Club	Season	League			Cup		Total	
Club	Season	Division	Apps	Goals	Apps	Goals	Apps	Goals
Rostov	2023–24	Russian Premier League	0	0	1	0	1	0
Rostov	2024–25	Russian Premier League	6	0	3	0	9	0
Rostov	2025–26	Russian Premier League	13	0	5	0	18	0
Rostov	2026–27	Russian Premier League	7	0	2	0	9	0
Rostov	Total		26	0	11	0	37	0
Rostov-2	2024	Russian Second League B	25	8	—		25	8
Rostov-2	2025	Russian Second League B	9	3	—		9	3
Rostov-2	Total		34	11	—		34	11
Career total			60	11	11	0	71	11
