= Ilya Zubenko =

Russian footballer (born 2006)

Personal information
- Full name: Ilya Artyomovich Zubenko
- Date of birth: 29 May 2006 (age 20)
- Place of birth: Salsk, Russia
- Height: 1.80 m (5 ft 11 in)
- Position: Defensive midfielder

Team information
- Current team: Rostov-2
- Number: 86

Youth career
- Rostov

Senior career*
Years	Team	Apps	(Gls)
2024–	Rostov	1	(0)
2024–	Rostov-2	55	(6)
2025	→ Volga Ulyanovsk (loan)	3	(0)

International career^{‡}
2021	Russia U15	6	(0)
2021	Russia U16	4	(0)
2022–2023	Russia U17	3	(0)
- * Club domestic league appearances and goals as of 31 October 2026 ‡ National team caps and goals as of 9 February 2023

Ilya Artyomovich Zubenko (Russian: Илья Артёмович Зубенко; born 29 May 2006) is a Russian football player who plays as a defensive midfielder for Rostov-2.

== Career ==
He made his debut in the Russian Premier League for Rostov on 1 March 2024 in a game against Krylia Sovetov Samara.

== Career statistics ==
As of match played 31 October 2026

Appearances and goals by club, season and competition
Club	Season	League			Cup		Other		Total	
Club	Season	Division	Apps	Goals	Apps	Goals	Apps	Goals	Apps	Goals
Rostov	2023–24	Russian Premier League	1	0	1	0	—		2	0
Rostov	2024–25	Russian Premier League	0	0	2	0	—		2	0
Rostov	2025–26	Russian Premier League	0	0	0	0	—		0	0
Rostov	Total		1	0	3	0	—		4	0
Rostov-2	2024	Russian Second League B	15	5	—		—		15	5
Rostov-2	2025	Russian Second League B	21	0	—		—		21	0
Rostov-2	2026	Russian Second League B	19	1	—		—		19	1
Rostov-2	Total		55	6	—		—		55	6
Volga Ulyanovsk (loan)	2025–26	Russian First League	3	0	—		—		3	0
Career total			59	6	3	0	0	0	62	6
