= Daniil Shantaly =

Russian footballer

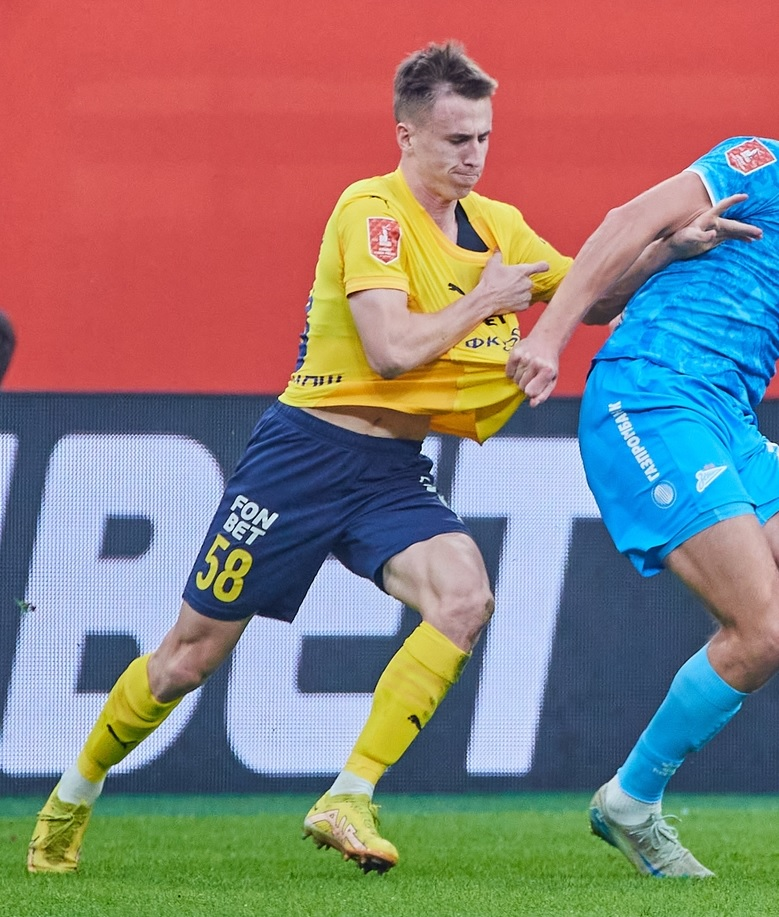
- Shantaly with Rostov in 2025

Personal information
- Full name: Daniil Igorevich Shantaly
- Date of birth: 24 May 2004 (age 22)
- Place of birth: Krasnodar, Russia
- Height: 1.79 m (5 ft 10 in)
- Position: Midfielder

Team information
- Current team: Rostov
- Number: 21

Youth career
- –2020: Krasnodar
- 2020–2023: Rostov

Senior career*
Years	Team	Apps	(Gls)
2024–	Rostov	33	(2)
2024–2025	→ Rostov-2	20	(4)
- * Club domestic league appearances and goals as of 20 November 2026

Daniil Igorevich Shantaly (Russian: Даниил Игоревич Шанталий; born 24 May 2004) is a Russian football player who plays as a midfielder for Rostov.

== Career ==
Shantaly made his Russian Premier League debut for Rostov on 14 September 2024 against Krasnodar.

== Career statistics ==
As of match played 20 November 2026

Appearances and goals by club, season and competition
Club	Season	League			Cup		Total	
Club	Season	Division	Apps	Goals	Apps	Goals	Apps	Goals
Rostov	2023–24	Russian Premier League	0	0	2	0	2	0
Rostov	2024–25	Russian Premier League	12	0	8	0	20	0
Rostov	2025–26	Russian Premier League	11	0	6	3	17	3
Rostov	2026–27	Russian Premier League	10	2	5	1	15	3
Rostov	Total		33	2	21	4	54	6
Rostov-2	2024	Russian Second League B	18	4	—		18	4
Rostov-2	2025	Russian Second League B	2	0	—		2	0
Rostov-2	Total		20	4	0	0	20	4
Career total			53	6	21	4	74	10
