= Oumar Sako =

Nigerien footballer

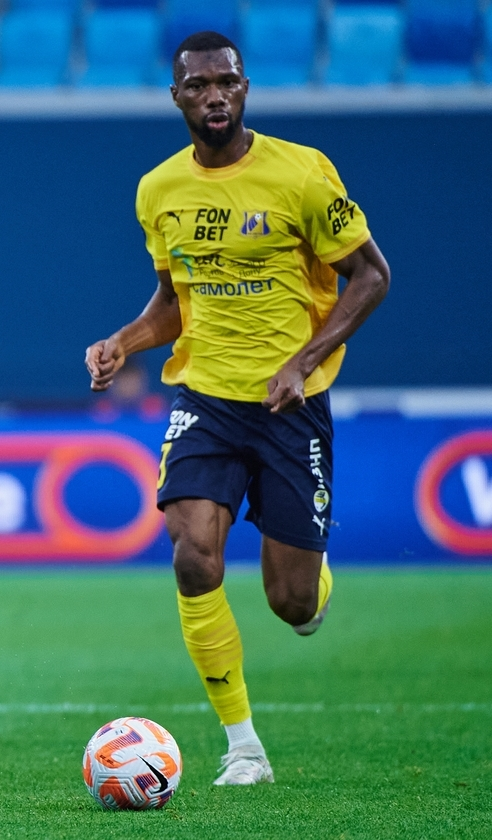

Personal information
- Date of birth: 4 May 1996 (age 30)
- Place of birth: Abobo, Ivory Coast
- Height: 1.91 m (6 ft 3 in)
- Position: Defender

Team information
- Current team: Rostov
- Number: 3

Youth career
- AS Tanda

Senior career*
| Years | Team | Apps | (Gls) |
| 2017–2018 | AS Tanda | | |
| 2018–2020 | ASEC Mimosas | | |
| 2020–2021 | Al-Kharaitiyat | 19 | (1) |
| 2021 | Beroe | 17 | (1) |
| 2022–2023 | LASK | 7 | (0) |
| 2022–2023 | → Arda (loan) | 28 | (1) |
| 2023–2024 | Arda | 20 | (2) |
| 2024 | → Rostov (loan) | 11 | (0) |
| 2024– | Rostov | 65 | (2) |

International career^{‡}
| 2019 | Ivory Coast | 1 | (0) |
| 2024– | Niger | 21 | (6) |
- * Club domestic league appearances and goals as of 20 November 2026 ‡ National team caps and goals as of 17 November 2026

Oumar Sako (born 4 May 1996) is a professional footballer who plays as a defender for Russian club Rostov. Born in the Ivory Coast, and a former Ivory Coast international, he plays for the Niger national team.

== Club career ==
On 30 January 2024, Sako joined Russian Premier League club Rostov on loan. On 26 June 2024, Rostov made the transfer permanent and signed a three-year contract with Sako.

== International career ==
Sako made his debut for the Ivory Coast national team on 22 September 2019 in a CHAN qualifier against Niger.

In May 2024, Sako's club Rostov announced that he has been called up to the Niger national team. Sako made his debut for Niger on 9 September 2024 in a Africa Cup of Nations qualifier against Ghana at the Berkane Municipal Stadium in Morocco and scored the equalizing goal in a 1–1 draw. He scored a late winner for Niger in the away 2–1 victory over Ghana in the same qualification on 18 November 2024, even though Niger failed to advance from the qualification group.

== Career statistics ==
=== Club ===
As of match played 20 November 2026

Appearances and goals by club, season and competition
| Club | Season | League | | | Cup | | Continental | | Other | | Total | |
| Club | Season | Division | Apps | Goals | Apps | Goals | Apps | Goals | Apps | Goals | Apps | Goals |
|---|---|---|---|---|---|---|---|---|---|---|---|---|
| Mimosas | 2018–19 | Ligue 1 | — | | — | | 8 (Note: Appearances in CAF Champions League) | 0 | — | | 8 | 0 |
| Al Kharaitiyat | 2020–21 | Qatar Stars League | 19 | 1 | 5 | 0 | — | | 2 (Note: Appearances of Emir of Qatar Cup) | 0 | 26 | 1 |
| Stara Gazora | 2021–22 | efbet Liga | 17 | 1 | 1 | 0 | — | | — | | 18 | 1 |
| LASK | 2021–22 | Austrian Bundesliga | 7 | 0 | 0 | 0 | 1 (Note: Appearance in UEFA Europa Conference League) | 0 | — | | 8 | 0 |
| Arda (loan) | 2022–23 | efbet Liga | 28 | 1 | 3 | 0 | — | | — | | 31 | 1 |
| Arda | 2023–24 | efbet Liga | 20 | 2 | 0 | 0 | — | | — | | 20 | 2 |
| Rostov (loan) | 2023–24 | Russian Premier League | 11 | 0 | 3 | 0 | — | | — | | 14 | 0 |
| Rostov | 2024–25 | Russian Premier League | 28 | 1 | 11 | 0 | — | | — | | 39 | 1 |
| Rostov | 2025–26 | Russian Premier League | 23 | 0 | 6 | 0 | — | | — | | 29 | 0 |
| Rostov | 2026–27 | Russian Premier League | 14 | 1 | 4 | 0 | — | | — | | 18 | 1 |
| Rostov | Total | | 65 | 2 | 22 | 0 | 0 | 0 | 0 | 0 | 87 | 2 |
| Career total | | | 167 | 7 | 33 | 0 | 9 | 0 | 2 | 0 | 211 | 7 |

=== International ===
As of match played 17 November 2026

Appearances and goals by national team and year
| National team | Year | Apps | Goals |
|---|---|---|---|
| Ivory Coast | 2019 | 1 | 0 |
| Niger | 2024 | 3 | 2 |
| Niger | 2025 | 10 | 2 |
| Niger | 2026 | 8 | 2 |
| Country total | | 21 | 6 |

==== International goals ====
Scores and results list Niger's goal tally first.

| No. | Date | Venue | Opponent | Score | Result | Competition |
|---|---|---|---|---|---|---|
| 1. | 9 September 2024 | Berkane Municipal Stadium, Berkane, Morocco | Ghana | 1–1 | 1–1 | 2025 Africa Cup of Nations qualification |
| 2. | 18 November 2024 | Accra Sports Stadium, Accra, Ghana | Ghana | 2–1 | 2–1 | 2025 Africa Cup of Nations qualification |
| 3. | 6 June 2025 | Seyni Kountche Stadium, Niamey, Niger | Gabon | 3–1 | 4–3 | Friendly |
| 4. | 18 November 2025 | Berrechid Municipal Stadium, Berrechid, Morocco | Guinea | 1–1 | 1–1 | Friendly |
| 5. | 5 June 2026 | Père Jégo Stadium, Casablanca, Morocco | Benin | 1–1 | 1–1 | Friendly |
| 5. | 24 September 2026 | Accra Sports Stadium, Accra, Ghana | Lesotho | 2–0 | 2–1 | 2027 Africa Cup of Nations qualification |
