= Maksim Osipenko =

Russian footballer

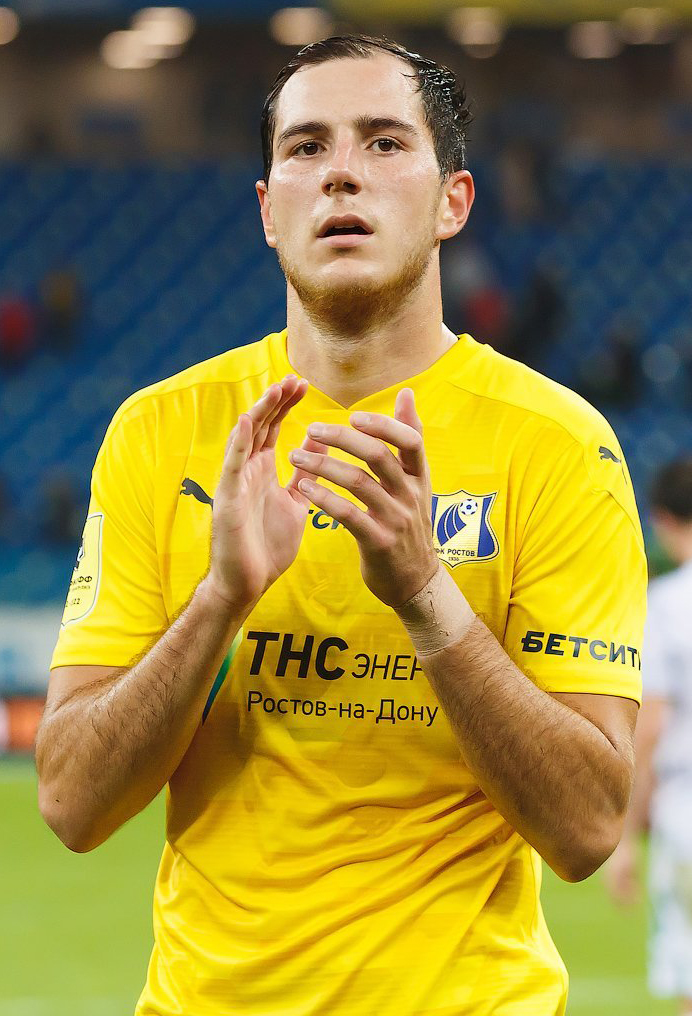
- Osipenko with FC Rostov in 2021

Personal information
- Full name: Maksim Aleksandrovich Osipenko
- Date of birth: 16 May 1994 (age 32)
- Place of birth: Omsk, Russia
- Height: 1.93 m (6 ft 4 in)
- Position: Centre-back

Team information
- Current team: Dynamo Moscow
- Number: 55

Youth career
- 2003–2012: Neftyanik Omsk

Senior career*
Years	Team	Apps	(Gls)
2012–2015	Irtysh Omsk	50	(7)
2016–2019	Fakel Voronezh	102	(9)
2019	Tambov	17	(1)
2020–2025	Rostov	146	(23)
2025–	Dynamo Moscow	36	(3)

International career^{‡}
2021–	Russia	20	(3)
- * Club domestic league appearances and goals as of 22 November 2026 ‡ National team caps and goals as of 6 October 2026

Maksim Aleksandrovich Osipenko (Russian: Максим Александрович Осипенко; born 16 May 1994) is a Russian football defender who plays as a centre-back for Dynamo Moscow and the Russia national team.

== Club career ==
Osipenko made his debut in the Russian Second Division for Irtysh Omsk on 6 August 2013 in a game against Baikal Irkutsk.Maksim Osipenko at Sportbox.ru (in Russian)

On 19 June 2019, Osipenko signed a one-year contract with one-year extension option with Russian Premier League club Tambov. He made his debut in the Russian Premier League for Tambov on 14 July 2019 in a game against Zenit St. Petersburg.

On 9 January 2020 he signed a 4.5-year contract with Rostov. On 6 December 2022, Osipenko extended his contract with Rostov until the end of the 2026–27 season.

On 17 June 2025, Osipenko signed a three-year contract with Dynamo Moscow, with an option to extend for two additional seasons.

== International career ==
He was called up to the Russia national football team for the first time for World Cup qualifiers against Croatia, Cyprus and Malta in September 2021. He made his debut on 7 September 2021 against Malta, starting and playing the whole game in a 2–0 home victory.

== Career statistics ==
=== Club ===
As of match played 22 November 2026

Appearances and goals by club, season and competition
Club	Season	League			Cup		Europe		Other		Total	
Club	Season	Division	Apps	Goals	Apps	Goals	Apps	Goals	Apps	Goals	Apps	Goals
Irtysh Omsk	2013–14	Russian Second League	12	2	0	0	—		—		12	2
Irtysh Omsk	2014–15	Russian Second League	24	4	1	0	—		—		25	4
Irtysh Omsk	2015–16	Russian Second League	14	1	1	1	–		–		15	2
Irtysh Omsk	Total		50	7	2	1	—		—		52	8
Fakel Voronezh	2015–16	Russian First League	10	2	—		—		—		10	2
Fakel Voronezh	2016–17	Russian First League	22	2	2	0	—		4 (Note: Appearances in the FNL Cup)	0	28	2
Fakel Voronezh	2017–18	Russian First League	37	4	2	0	—		5	1	44	5
Fakel Voronezh	2018–19	Russian First League	33	1	1	0	—		5	1	39	2
Fakel Voronezh	Total		102	9	5	0	—		14	2	121	11
Tambov	2019–20	Russian Premier League	17	1	1	0	—		—		18	1
Rostov	2019–20	Russian Premier League	9	0	—		—		—		9	0
Rostov	2020–21	Russian Premier League	28	0	1	0	1 (Note: Appearance in the UEFA Europa League)	0	—		30	0
Rostov	2021–22	Russian Premier League	29	2	1	0	—		—		30	2
Rostov	2022–23	Russian Premier League	26	6	7	1	—		—		33	7
Rostov	2023–24	Russian Premier League	24	6	5	1	—		—		29	7
Rostov	2024–25	Russian Premier League	30	9	10	1	—		—		40	10
Rostov	Total		146	23	24	3	1	0	0	0	171	26
Dynamo Moscow	2025–26	Russian Premier League	22	2	7	1	—		—		29	3
Dynamo Moscow	2026–27	Russian Premier League	14	1	1	0	—		—		15	1
Dynamo Moscow	Total		36	3	8	1	0	0	0	0	44	4
Career total			351	43	40	5	1	0	14	2	406	50

=== International ===
As of match played 6 October 2026

Appearances and goals by national team and year
National team	Year	Apps	Goals
Russia	2021	3	0
Russia	2022	3	0
Russia	2023	4	0
Russia	2024	2	3
Russia	2025	6	0
Russia	2026	2	0
Total		20	3

==== International goals ====
Scores and results list Russia's goal tally first.

No.	Date	Venue	Opponent	Score	Result	Competition
1	21 March 2024	VTB Arena, Moscow, Russia	Serbia	2–0	4–0	Friendly
2	19 November 2024	Volgograd Arena, Volgograd, Russia	Syria	1–0	4–0	Friendly
3	19 November 2024	Volgograd Arena, Volgograd, Russia	Syria	4–0	4–0	Friendly

== Honours ==
Individual

- Russian Premier League Team of the Season: 2022–23
