= Yegor Golenkov =

Russian footballer

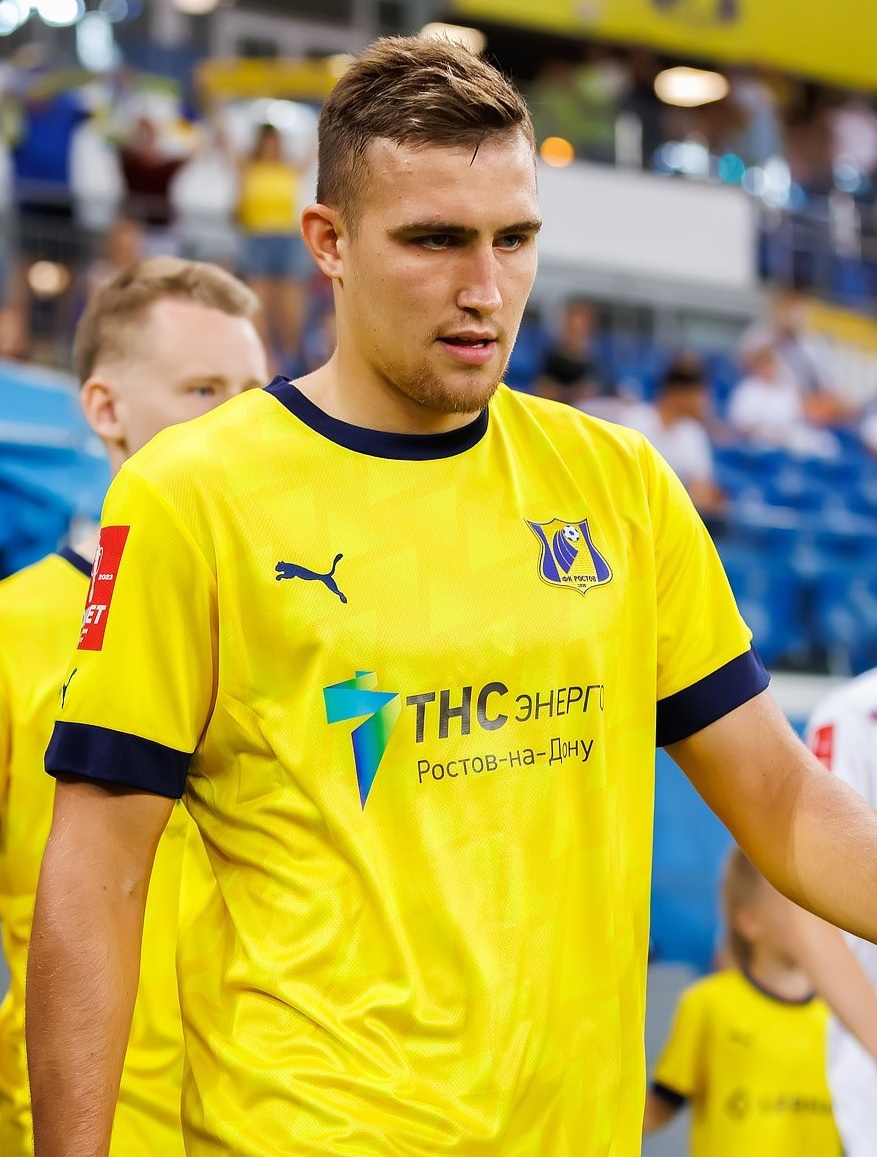
- Golenkov with Rostov in 2022

Personal information
- Full name: Yegor Dmitriyevich Golenkov
- Date of birth: 7 July 1999 (age 27)
- Place of birth: Samara, Russia
- Height: 1.89 m (6 ft 2 in)
- Position: Centre-forward

Team information
- Current team: Baltika Kaliningrad
- Number: 69

Youth career
- Konoplyov football academy

Senior career*
Years	Team	Apps	(Gls)
2015–2021	Krylia Sovetov Samara	46	(14)
2020–2021	→ Krylia Sovetov-2 Samara	2	(1)
2021–2022	Sigma Olomouc	0	(0)
2022–2026	Rostov	126	(18)
2026–	Baltika Kaliningrad	6	(2)

International career^{‡}
2018	Russia U20	1	(0)
- * Club domestic league appearances and goals as of 21 November 2026 ‡ National team caps and goals as of 15 October 2018

Yegor Dmitriyevich Golenkov (Russian: Егор Дмитриевич Голенков; born 7 July 1999) is a Russian football player who plays as a centre-forward for Baltika Kaliningrad.

== Club career ==
He made his debut in the Russian Premier League for Krylia Sovetov Samara on 31 October 2016 in a game against Orenburg.

On 31 August 2021, he signed a two-year contract with Czech club Sigma Olomouc.

On 9 February 2022, Golenkov signed a five-year contract with Rostov.

On 8 September 2026, Golenkov moved to Baltika Kaliningrad on a three-year deal.

== Career statistics ==
As of match played 21 November 2026

Appearances and goals by club, season and competition
Club	Season	League			Cup		Total	
Club	Season	Division	Apps	Goals	Apps	Goals	Apps	Goals
Krylia Sovetov Samara	2016–17	Russian Premier League	1	0	0	0	1	0
Krylia Sovetov Samara	2019–20	Russian Premier League	9	0	0	0	9	0
Krylia Sovetov Samara	2020–21	Russian First League	36	14	6	3	42	17
Krylia Sovetov Samara	Total		46	14	6	3	52	17
Krylia Sovetov-2 Samara	2020–21	Russian Second League	2	1	—		2	1
Sigma Olomouc	2021–22	Czech First League	0	0	0	0	0	0
Rostov	2021–22	Russian Premier League	10	0	—		10	0
Rostov	2022–23	Russian Premier League	29	3	10	5	39	8
Rostov	2023–24	Russian Premier League	30	8	9	1	39	9
Rostov	2024–25	Russian Premier League	25	5	11	5	36	10
Rostov	2025–26	Russian Premier League	29	2	7	1	36	3
Rostov	2026–27	Russian Premier League	3	0	2	0	5	0
Rostov	Total		126	18	39	12	165	30
Baltika Kaliningrad	2026–27	Russian Premier League	6	2	2	1	8	3
Career total			180	35	47	16	227	51

== Honours ==
Krylia Sovetov Samara

- Russian First League: 2020–21
