= Andrei Langovich =

Russian footballer

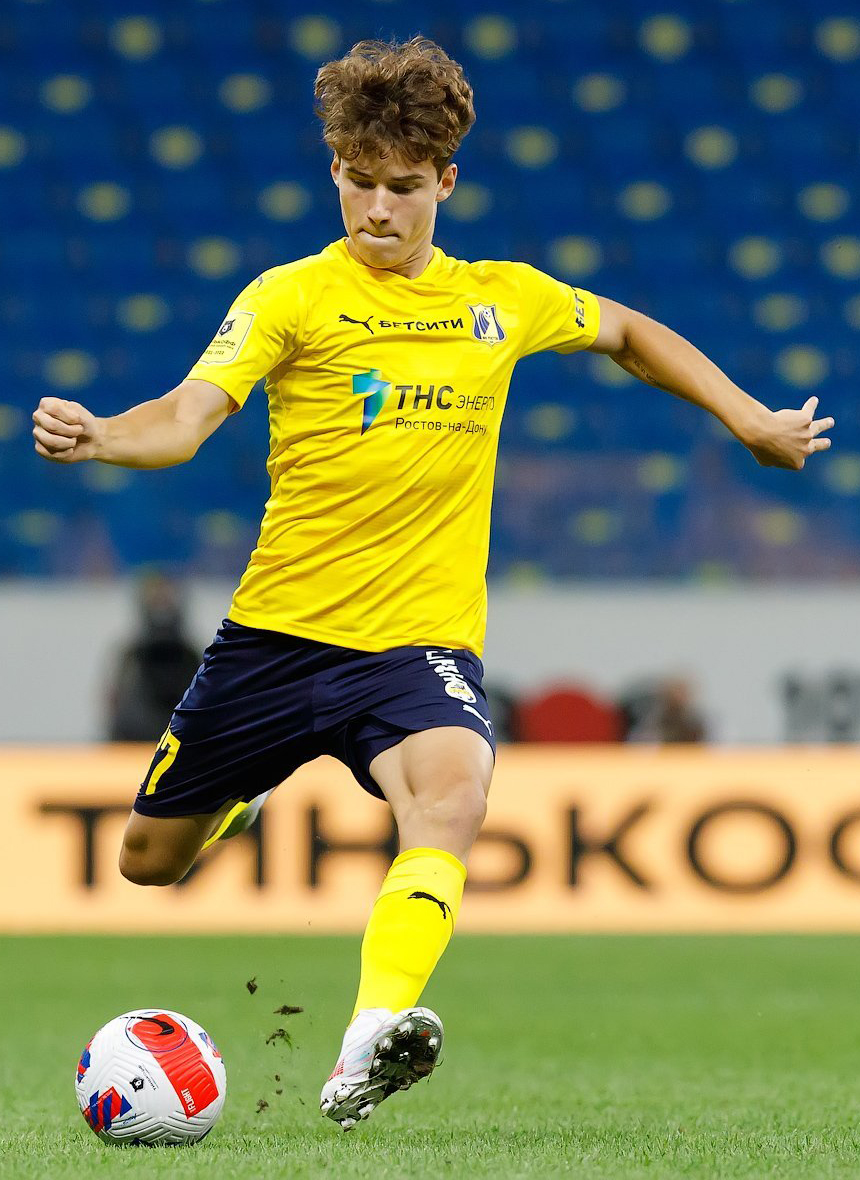

Personal information
- Full name: Andrei Vladimirovich Langovich
- Date of birth: 28 May 2003 (age 23)
- Place of birth: Rostov-on-Don, Russia
- Height: 1.80 m (5 ft 11 in)
- Positions: Right-back; centre-back

Team information
- Current team: Rostov
- Number: 87

Youth career
- 2010–2012: Azov Sport School
- 2012–2020: Rostov

Senior career*
Years	Team	Apps	(Gls)
2020–	Rostov	114	(6)

International career^{‡}
2021	Russia U18	4	(0)
2021	Russia U19	4	(0)
2022	Russia U21	3	(0)
2026–	Russia	2	(0)
- * Club domestic league appearances and goals as of 20 November 2026 ‡ National team caps and goals as of 17 November 2026

Andrei Vladimirovich Langovich (Russian: Андрей Владимирович Лангович; born 28 May 2003) is a Russian football player who plays as a right-back for Rostov and the Russia national team.

== Club career ==
He was raised in the Rostov academy and was first called up to the senior squad in November 2020.

He made his debut in the Russian Premier League for Rostov on 23 July 2021 in a game against Dynamo Moscow, he substituted Denis Terentyev in the 80th minute.

On 19 April 2022, Langovich signed a new five-year contract with Rostov. On 16 June 2023, he signed a new contract with Rostov until 2028.

== International career ==
Langovich was first called up to the Russia national football team for a training camp in September 2023.

He made his debut on 12 November 2026 in a friendly against Uzbekistan.

== Career statistics ==
=== Club ===
As of match played 20 November 2026

Appearances and goals by club, season and competition
Club	Season	League			Cup		Europe		Total	
Club	Season	Division	Apps	Goals	Apps	Goals	Apps	Goals	Apps	Goals
Rostov	2020–21	Russian Premier League	0	0	0	0	0	0	0	0
Rostov	2021–22	Russian Premier League	16	0	2	0	—		18	0
Rostov	2022–23	Russian Premier League	22	2	9	1	—		31	3
Rostov	2023–24	Russian Premier League	22	1	9	0	—		31	1
Rostov	2024–25	Russian Premier League	23	1	10	1	—		33	2
Rostov	2025–26	Russian Premier League	16	0	8	0	—		24	0
Rostov	2026–27	Russian Premier League	15	2	1	0	—		16	2
Career total			114	6	39	2	0	0	153	8

=== International ===
As of match played 17 November 2026

Appearances and goals by national team and year
National team	Year	Apps	Goals
Russia	2026	2	0
Total		2	0
