= Luka Vešner Tičić =

Slovenian footballer (born 2000)

Personal information
- Date of birth: 25 October 2000 (age 26)
- Place of birth: Maribor, Slovenia
- Height: 1.78 m (5 ft 10 in)
- Position: Central midfielder

Team information
- Current team: Celje
- Number: 14

Youth career
- 2006–2013: Železničar Maribor
- 2013–2018: Interblock
- 2018–2019: Ilirija 1911

Senior career*
| Years | Team | Apps | (Gls) |
| 2018–2019 | Ilirija 1911 | 8 | (0) |
| 2019–2021 | Krka | 41 | (5) |
| 2021–2024 | Koper | 92 | (5) |
| 2024–2026 | Nizhny Novgorod | 50 | (2) |
| 2026– | Celje | 0 | (0) |

International career
| 2021–2022 | Slovenia U21 | 10 | (0) |
| 2024 | Slovenia | 1 | (0) |
- * Club domestic league appearances and goals as of 2 September 2026

Luka Vešner Tičić (born 25 October 2000) is a Slovenian footballer who plays as a central midfielder for Slovenian PrvaLiga club Celje.

== Club career ==
On 8 July 2024, Vešner Tičić signed with Nizhny Novgorod in the Russian Premier League.

== International career ==
Vešner Tičić made his debut for the Slovenia national team on 20 January 2024 in a friendly against the United States.
