= Kirill Shchetinin =

Russian footballer (born 2002)

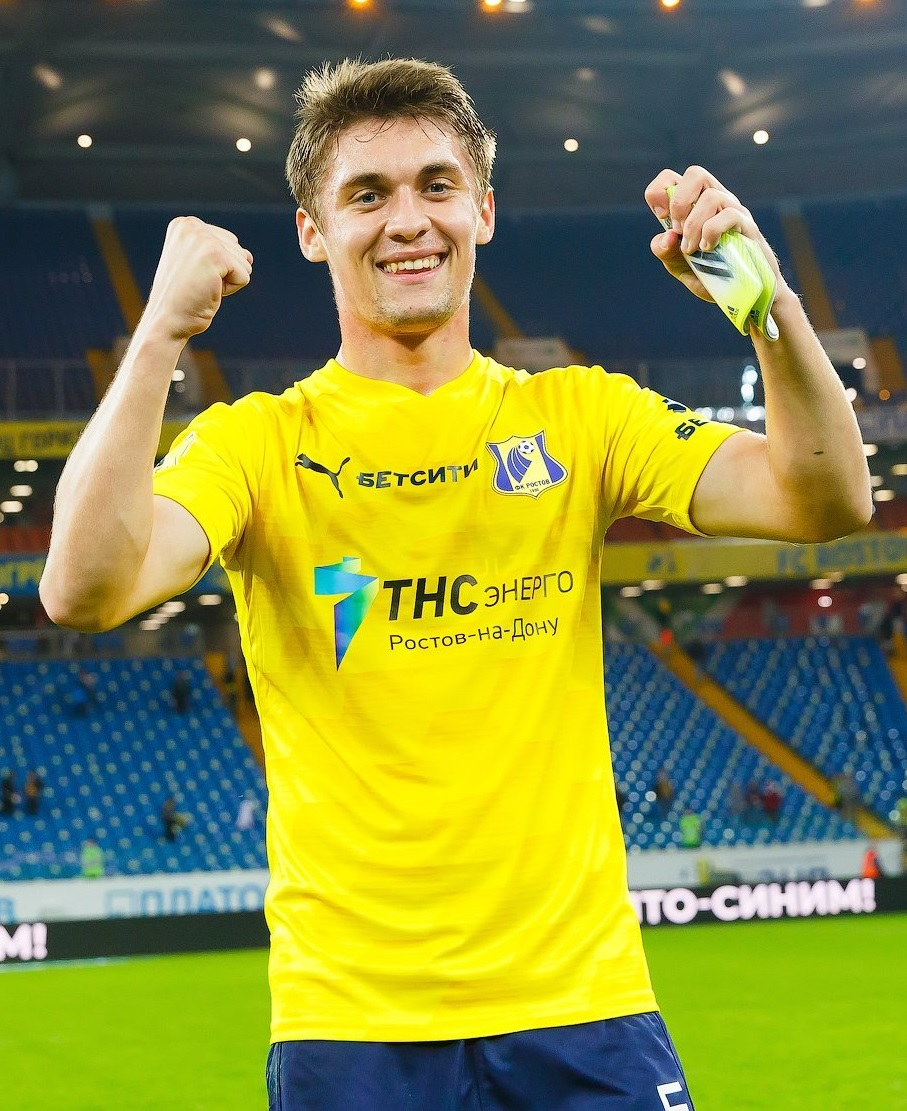
- Shchetinin with Rostov in 2021

Personal information
- Full name: Kirill Vadimovich Shchetinin
- Date of birth: 17 January 2002 (age 24)
- Place of birth: Kursk, Russia
- Height: 1.78 m (5 ft 10 in)
- Position: Attacking midfielder

Team information
- Current team: Akhmat Grozny
- Number: 10

Youth career
- 2007–: Avangard Kursk
- –2019: Lokomotiv Moscow
- 2019–2021: Zenit St. Petersburg

Senior career*
| Years | Team | Apps | (Gls) |
| 2021–2022 | Zenit St. Petersburg | 0 | (0) |
| 2021–2022 | → Rostov (loan) | 12 | (2) |
| 2022–2026 | Rostov | 112 | (8) |
| 2026– | Akhmat Grozny | 14 | (0) |

International career^{‡}
| 2017 | Russia U15 | 5 | (1) |
| 2017–2018 | Russia U16 | 13 | (1) |
| 2018–2019 | Russia U17 | 11 | (9) |
| 2019 | Russia U18 | 6 | (1) |
| 2022 | Russia U21 | 3 | (0) |
| 2025– | Russia | 1 | (0) |
- * Club domestic league appearances and goals as of 21 November 2026 ‡ National team caps and goals as of 10 June 2025

Kirill Vadimovich Shchetinin (Russian: Кирилл Вадимович Щетинин; born 17 January 2002) is a Russian football player who plays as an attacking midfielder for Akhmat Grozny and the Russia national team.

== Club career ==
He appeared for Lokomotiv Moscow Under-19 team in the 2018–19 UEFA Youth League.

He moved to the youth team of Zenit St. Petersburg in August 2019 and played for Zenit U19 in the 2019–20 UEFA Youth League.

On 26 July 2021, he joined Rostov on loan.

He made his debut in the Russian Premier League for Rostov on 23 October 2021 in a game against Arsenal Tula.

On 12 June 2022, Shchetinin moved to Rostov on a permanent basis and signed a 4.5-year contract. On 16 June 2022, Russian Premier League gave Shchetinin "Goal of the Year" award for his goal against Lokomotiv Moscow.

On 25 June 2026, Shchetinin joined Akhmat Grozny on a four-year deal.

== International career ==
In the 2019 UEFA European Under-17 Championship qualification, he became the top goalscorer with 8 goals for Russia. At the final tournament, he scored once as Russia did not advance from the group stage.

Shchetinin was called up to the senior Russia national team for the first time in May 2024 for a friendly against Belarus. He made his senior international debut on 10 June 2025 in a friendly against Belarus.

== Personal life ==
His younger brother Mikhail Shchetinin is also a footballer.

== Career statistics ==
As of match played 21 November 2026

Appearances and goals by club, season and competition
| Club | Season | League | | | Cup | | Total | |
| Club | Season | Division | Apps | Goals | Apps | Goals | Apps | Goals |
|---|---|---|---|---|---|---|---|---|
| Rostov (loan) | 2021–22 | Russian Premier League | 12 | 2 | 1 | 0 | 13 | 2 |
| Rostov | 2022–23 | Russian Premier League | 30 | 1 | 9 | 1 | 39 | 2 |
| Rostov | 2023–24 | Russian Premier League | 25 | 4 | 8 | 0 | 33 | 4 |
| Rostov | 2024–25 | Russian Premier League | 28 | 1 | 12 | 0 | 40 | 1 |
| Rostov | 2025–26 | Russian Premier League | 29 | 2 | 7 | 0 | 36 | 2 |
| Rostov | Total | | 112 | 8 | 36 | 1 | 148 | 9 |
| Akhmat Grozny | 2026–27 | Russian Premier League | 14 | 0 | 3 | 0 | 17 | 0 |
| Career total | | | 138 | 10 | 40 | 1 | 178 | 11 |

=== International ===
As of match played 10 June 2025

Appearances and goals by national team and year
| National team | Year | Apps | Goals |
|---|---|---|---|
| Russia | 2025 | 1 | 0 |
| Total | | 1 | 0 |
