= Viktor Melyokhin =

Russian footballer

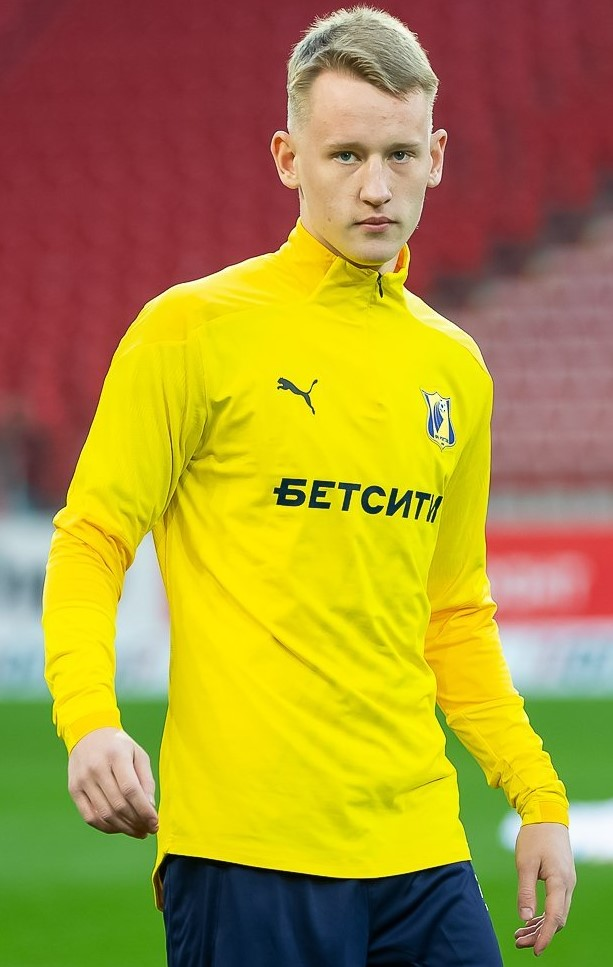
- Melyokhin with FC Rostov in 2021

Personal information
- Full name: Viktor Sergeyevich Melyokhin
- Date of birth: 16 December 2003 (age 22)
- Place of birth: Domodedovo, Moscow Oblast, Russia
- Height: 1.80 m (5 ft 11 in)
- Position: Centre-back

Team information
- Current team: Rostov
- Number: 4

Youth career
- –2013: Domodedovo Sport School
- 2013–2019: Vityaz Podolsk
- 2019–2021: Rodina Moscow

Senior career*
Years	Team	Apps	(Gls)
2021–	Rostov	120	(3)

International career^{‡}
2021	Russia U-18	2	(0)
2021	Russia U-19	4	(0)
2022	Russia U-21	3	(0)
2025–	Russia	12	(0)
- * Club domestic league appearances and goals as of 8 November 2026 ‡ National team caps and goals as of 17 November 2026

Viktor Sergeyevich Melyokhin (Russian: Виктор Сергеевич Мелёхин; born 16 December 2003) is a Russian football player who plays as a centre-back for FC Rostov and Russia national team.

== Club career ==
He made his debut in the Russian Premier League for FC Rostov on 22 August 2021 in a game against FC Nizhny Novgorod. He substituted Dennis Hadžikadunić at half-time. He made his first starting appearance in the next game against FC Ural Yekaterinburg on 27 August 2021.

On 15 April 2022, Melyokhin signed a new five-year contract with Rostov.

== International career ==
Melyokhin was first called up to the Russia national football team for a training camp in September 2023.

Melyokhin made his senior national team debut on 6 June 2025 in a friendly against Nigeria.

== Career statistics ==
As of match played 8 November 2026

Appearances and goals by club, season and competition
Club	Season	League			Cup		Total	
Club	Season	Division	Apps	Goals	Apps	Goals	Apps	Goals
Rostov	2021–22	Russian Premier League	17	0	1	0	18	0
Rostov	2022–23	Russian Premier League	24	0	10	0	34	0
Rostov	2023–24	Russian Premier League	23	0	5	1	28	1
Rostov	2024–25	Russian Premier League	15	0	11	1	26	1
Rostov	2025–26	Russian Premier League	28	2	7	0	35	2
Rostov	2026–27	Russian Premier League	13	1	5	0	18	1
Career total			120	3	39	2	159	5

=== International ===
As of match played 17 November 2026

Appearances and goals by national team and year
National team	Year	Apps	Goals
Russia	2025	4	0
Russia	2026	8	0
Total		12	0
