= Aleksey Koltakov =

Russian footballer

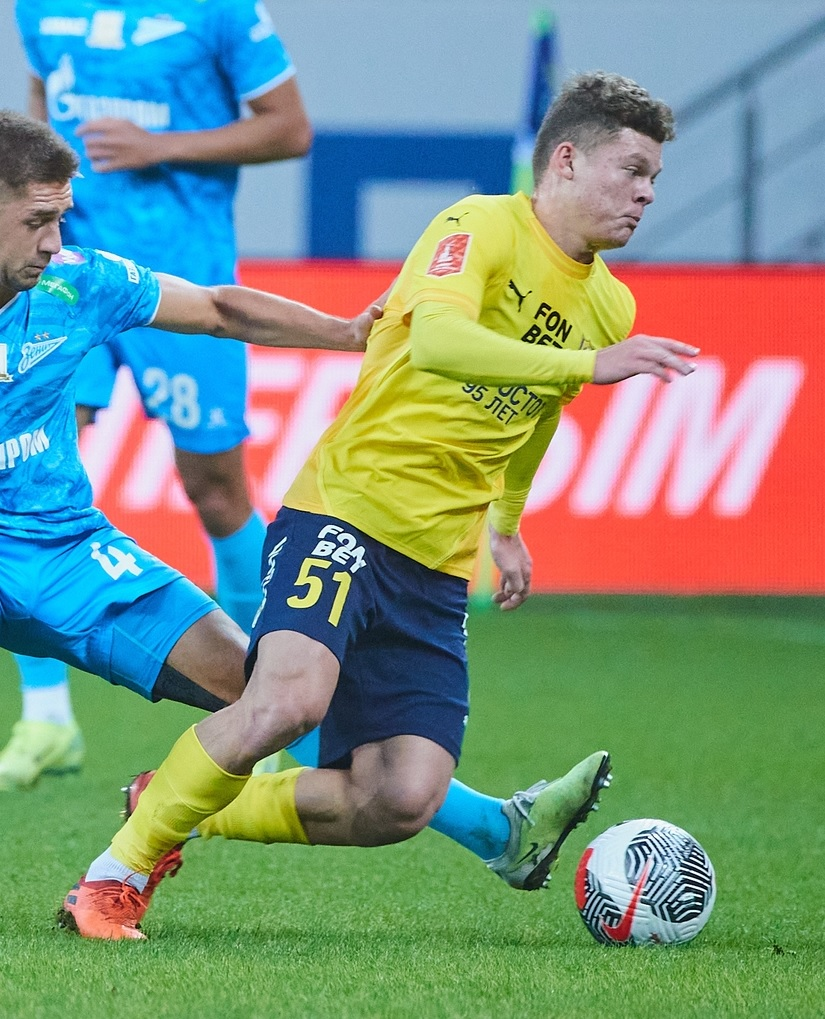
- Koltakov with Rostov in 2025

Personal information
- Full name: Aleksey Alekseyevich Koltakov
- Date of birth: 14 November 2005 (age 20)
- Place of birth: Azov, Russia
- Height: 1.75 m (5 ft 9 in)
- Position: Defensive midfielder

Team information
- Current team: Torpedo Moscow
- Number: 69

Youth career
- –2013: SDYuShOR-3 Azov
- 2013–2024: Rostov

Senior career*
Years	Team	Apps	(Gls)
2024–2026	Rostov	6	(0)
2024–2026	Rostov-2	36	(3)
2026–	Torpedo Moscow	3	(0)

International career^{‡}
2023	Russia U19	2	(0)
2023–	Russia U21	8	(2)
- * Club domestic league appearances and goals as of 16 May 2026 ‡ National team caps and goals as of 8 June 2025

Aleksey Alekseyevich Koltakov (Russian: Алексей Алексеевич Колтаков; born 14 November 2005) is a Russian football player who plays as a defensive midfielder for Torpedo Moscow.

== Career ==
He made his debut in the Russian Premier League for Rostov on 1 March 2024 in a game against Krylia Sovetov Samara.

On 23 January 2026, Koltakov moved to Torpedo Moscow in Russian First League.

== Career statistics ==
As of match played 22 November 2025

Appearances and goals by club, season and competition
Club	Season	League			Cup		Other		Total	
Club	Season	Division	Apps	Goals	Apps	Goals	Apps	Goals	Apps	Goals
Rostov	2023–24	Russian Premier League	5	0	4	0	–		9	0
Rostov	2024–25	Russian Premier League	1	0	1	0	–		2	0
Rostov	2025–26	Russian Premier League	0	0	3	0	–		3	0
Rostov	Total		6	0	8	0	0	0	14	0
Rostov-2	2024	Russian Second League B	17	1	–		–		17	1
Rostov-2	2025	Russian Second League B	19	2	–		–		19	2
Rostov-2	Total		36	3	0	0	0	0	36	3
Career total			42	3	8	0	0	0	50	3
