= Ilya Vakhaniya =

Russian footballer (born 2001)

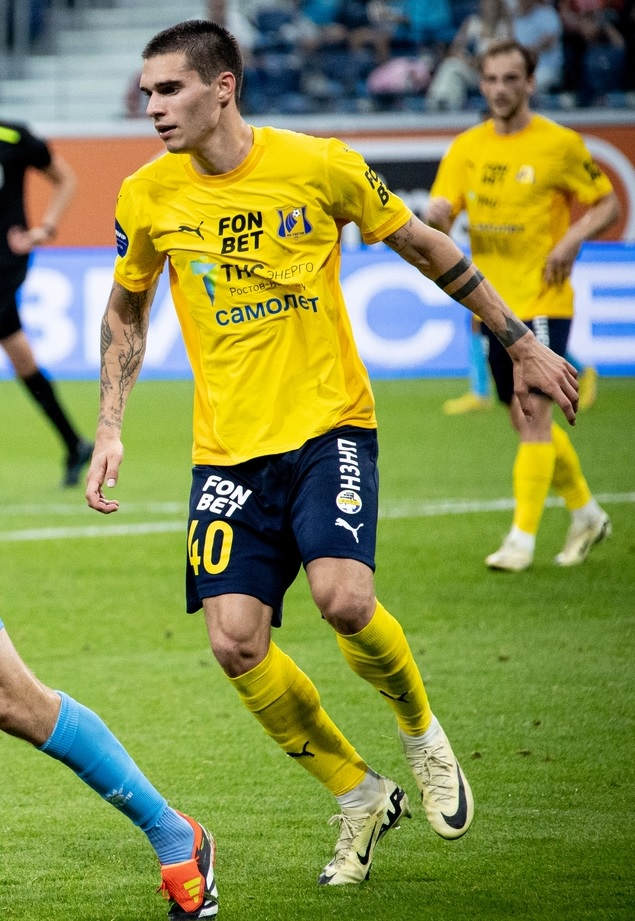
- Vakhaniya with Rostov in 2024

Personal information
- Full name: Ilya Sosoyevich Vakhaniya
- Date of birth: 14 January 2001 (age 25)
- Place of birth: Saint Petersburg, Russia
- Height: 1.78 m (5 ft 10 in)
- Positions: Right-back; left-back

Team information
- Current team: Krasnodar
- Number: 40

Youth career
- –2021: Zenit Saint Petersburg

Senior career*
Years	Team	Apps	(Gls)
2018–2023	Zenit-2 Saint Petersburg	60	(2)
2022	Zenit Saint Petersburg	0	(0)
2023–2026	Rostov	86	(2)
2026–	Krasnodar	14	(0)

International career^{‡}
2017	Russia U-17	1	(0)
2019	Russia U-18	12	(0)
2019–2020	Russia U-19	8	(1)
2024–	Russia	17	(2)
- * Club domestic league appearances and goals as of 22 November 2026 ‡ National team caps and goals as of 17 November 2026

Ilya Sosoyevich Vakhaniya (Russian: Илья Сосоевич Вахания; born 14 January 2001) is a Russian football player who plays as a right-back for Krasnodar and the Russia national team. He is also sometimes deployed as a left-back.

== Club career ==
Vakhaniya was raised in the youth system of Zenit Saint Petersburg. He was called up to Zenit's senior squad only once, on 21 May 2022 for a game against Nizhny Novgorod, but remained on the bench.

On 17 July 2023, Vakhaniya signed a contract with Rostov.

Vakhaniya made his Russian Premier League debut for Rostov on 5 August 2023 in a game against Krylia Sovetov Samara.

On 17 February 2026, Vakhaniya signed a contract with Krasnodar, beginning on 15 June 2026 and ending on 30 June 2030, remaining in Rostov for the rest of the 2025–26 season.

== International career ==
Vakhaniya was first called up to the Russia national football team for a training camp in September 2023. He made his debut on 7 June 2024 in a friendly against Belarus.

== Personal life ==
On his father's side, he is of Georgian descent.

== Career statistics ==
=== Club ===
As of match played 22 November 2026

Appearances and goals by club, season and competition
Club	Season	League			Cup		Total	
Club	Season	Division	Apps	Goals	Apps	Goals	Apps	Goals
Zenit-2 Saint Petersburg	2018–19	Russian First League	0	0	—		0	0
Zenit-2 Saint Petersburg	2020–21	Russian Second League	18	0	—		18	0
Zenit-2 Saint Petersburg	2021–22	Russian Second League	16	1	—		16	1
Zenit-2 Saint Petersburg	2023–24	Russian Second League	26	1	—		26	1
Zenit-2 Saint Petersburg	Total		60	2	—		60	2
Rostov	2023–24	Russian Premier League	28	1	5	1	33	2
Rostov	2024–25	Russian Premier League	29	0	13	0	42	0
Rostov	2025–26	Russian Premier League	29	1	5	1	34	2
Rostov	Total		86	2	23	2	109	4
Krasnodar	2026–27	Russian Premier League	14	0	3	0	17	0
Career total			160	4	26	2	186	6

=== International ===
As of match played 17 November 2026

Appearances and goals by national team and year
National team	Year	Apps	Goals
Russia	2024	1	0
Russia	2025	6	1
Russia	2026	10	1
Total		17	2

==== International goals ====
Scores and results list Russia's goal tally first.

No.	Date	Venue	Opponent	Score	Result	Competition
1	25 March 2025	VTB Arena, Moscow, Russia	Zambia	2–0	5–0	Friendly
2	5 June 2026	Volgograd Arena, Volgograd, Russia	Burkina Faso	3–0	3–0	Friendly
