= Ivan Komarov (footballer) =

Russian footballer

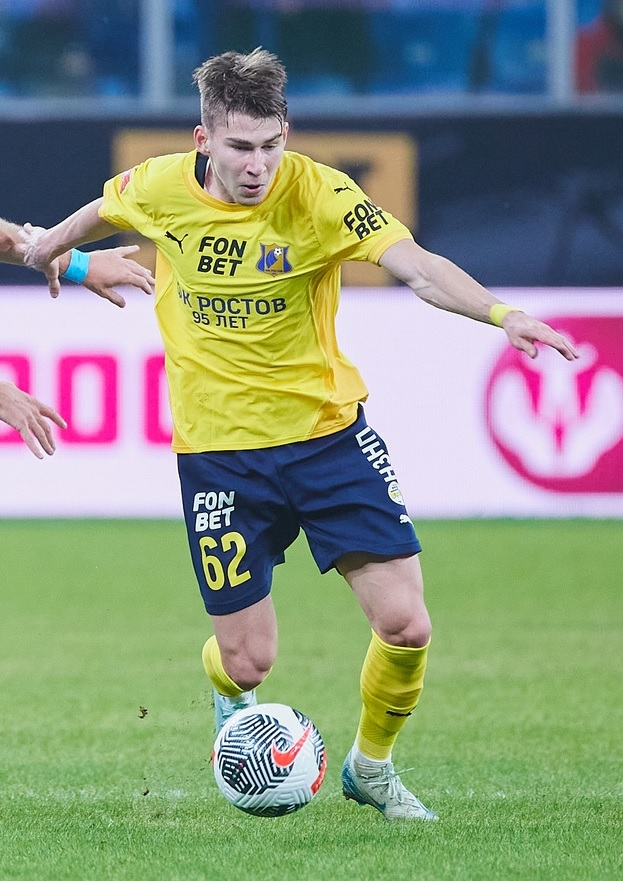
- Komarov with Rostov in 2025

Personal information
- Full name: Ivan Sergeyevich Komarov
- Date of birth: 15 April 2003 (age 23)
- Place of birth: Slavyansk-on-Kuban, Russia
- Height: 1.77 m (5 ft 9 1/2 in)
- Positions: Right midfielder; right winger

Team information
- Current team: FC Rostov
- Number: 10

Youth career
- FC Krasnodar
- Kuban Krasnodar
- Lokomotiv Moscow
- 2018–2020: FC Rostov

Senior career*
Years	Team	Apps	(Gls)
2020–	FC Rostov	86	(8)

International career^{‡}
2025–	Russia	1	(0)
- * Club domestic league appearances and goals as of 20 November 2026 ‡ National team caps and goals as of 25 March 2025

Ivan Sergeyevich Komarov (Russian: Иван Сергеевич Комаров; born 15 April 2003) is a Russian football player who plays as a right midfielder or right winger for FC Rostov and the Russia national team.

== Club career ==
He made his debut in the Russian Premier League for FC Rostov on 19 June 2020 in a game against PFC Sochi. FC Rostov was forced to field their Under-18 squad in that game as their main squad was quarantined after 6 players tested positive for COVID-19.

In June 2023, he signed a contract extension to keep him at the club until 2026.

== International career ==
In March 2025, Komarov was called up to the Russia national team for the first time for friendlies against Grenada and Zambia. He made his debut on 25 March 2025 against Zambia.

== Career statistics ==
=== Club ===
As of match played 20 November 2026

Appearances and goals by club, season and competition
Club	Season	League			Cup		Total	
Club	Season	Division	Apps	Goals	Apps	Goals	Apps	Goals
Rostov	2019–20	Russian Premier League	1	0	0	0	1	0
Rostov	2021–22	Russian Premier League	0	0	1	0	1	0
Rostov	2022–23	Russian Premier League	11	0	1	0	12	0
Rostov	2023–24	Russian Premier League	16	1	11	2	27	3
Rostov	2024–25	Russian Premier League	19	3	9	1	28	4
Rostov	2025–26	Russian Premier League	24	1	6	2	30	3
Rostov	2026–27	Russian Premier League	15	3	4	2	19	5
Rostov	Total		86	8	32	7	118	15
Career total			86	8	32	7	118	15

=== International ===
As of match played 25 March 2025

Appearances and goals by national team and year
National team	Year	Apps	Goals
Russia	2025	1	0
Total		1	0
