= Hidajet Hankić =

Austrian footballer

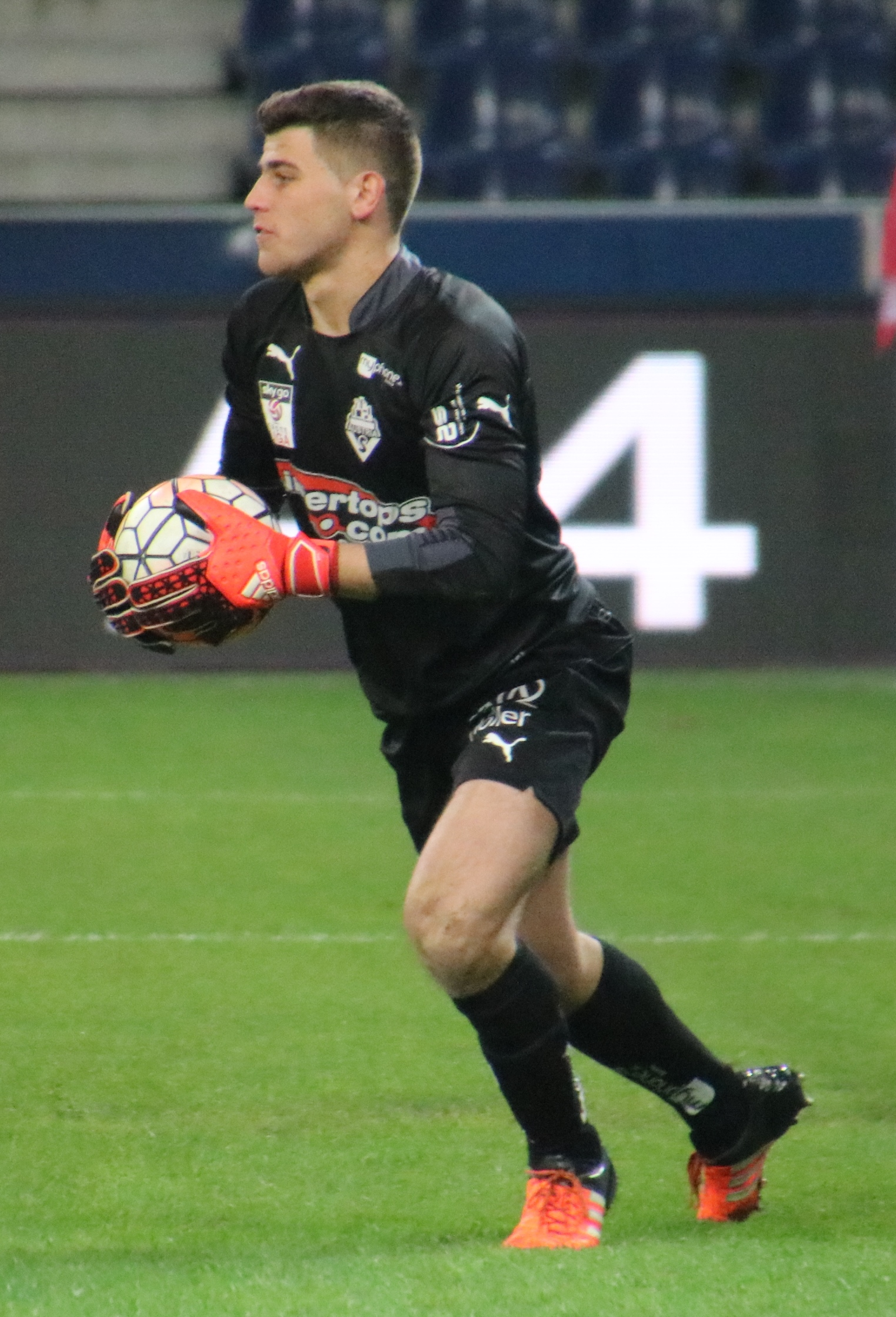
- Hankić with Austria Salzburg in 2016

Personal information
- Date of birth: 29 June 1994 (age 32)
- Place of birth: Schwarzach im Pongau, Austria
- Height: 1.85 m (6 ft 1 in)
- Position: Goalkeeper

Youth career
- 2001-2004: ASC St. Paul
- 2004-2007: ATSV Wolfsberg
- 2007-2009: SK St. Andrä
- 2009–2011: AKA Linz
- 2011–2012: Mladá Boleslav

Senior career*
Years	Team	Apps	(Gls)
2012–2015	Mladá Boleslav	2	(0)
2015–2016	Austria Salzburg	13	(0)
2016–2018	Blau-Weiß Linz	60	(0)
2018–2019	Wacker Innsbruck	3	(0)
2018–2019	Wacker Innsbruck II	4	(0)
2019–2021	Botoșani	34	(0)
2021–2022	Botev Plovdiv II	7	(0)
2021–2024	Botev Plovdiv	52	(0)
2024–2026	Rostov	4	(0)
- * Club domestic league appearances and goals as of 21 April 2026

Hidajet Hankić (born 29 June 1994) is a professional footballer who plays as a goalkeeper. Born in Austria, he represents Bosnia and Herzegovina internationally.

== Career ==
Hankić made his Czech First League debut for Mladá Boleslav on 25 May 2014 in a game against AC Sparta Prague.

On 2 July 2019, he signed a contract with Liga I club FC Botoșani.

On 19 July 2021, Hankić was presented as a new player of First League side Botev Plovdiv.

On 25 June 2024, Hankić signed with Russian Premier League club Rostov.

== International career ==
Hankić was called up for Bosnia and Herzegovina for UEFA Euro 2024 qualifying matches against Luxembourg and Slovakia on 16 and 19 November 2023, respectively.

== Honours ==
Botev Plovdiv

- Bulgarian Cup: 2023–24

== Career statistics ==
As of match played 21 April 2026

Appearances and goals by club, season and competition
Club	Season	League			Cup		Continental		Other		Total	
Club	Season	Division	Apps	Goals	Apps	Goals	Apps	Goals	Apps	Goals	Apps	Goals
Mladá Boleslav	2012–13	Czech First League	0	0	0	0	0	0	—		8	0
Mladá Boleslav	2013–14	Czech First League	2	0	0	0	—		—		2	0
Mladá Boleslav	Total		2	0	0	0	0	0	0	0	2	0
Austria Salzburg	2015–16	2. Liga	13	0	1	0	—		—		14	0
Blau-Weiß Linz	2016–17	2. Liga	30	0	3	0	—		—		33	0
Blau-Weiß Linz	2017–18	2. Liga	30	0	1	0	—		—		31	0
Blau-Weiß Linz	Total		60	0	4	0	0	0	0	0	64	0
Wacker Innsbruck	2018–19	Austrian Football Bundesliga	3	0	1	0	—		—		4	0
Wacker Innsbruck II	2018–19	2. Liga	4	0	—		—		—		4	0
Botoșani	2019–20	Liga I	11	0	2	0	—		—		13	0
Botoșani	2020–21	Liga I	23	0	0	0	0	0	—		23	0
Botoșani	Total		34	0	2	0	0	0	0	0	36	0
Botev Plovdiv II	2021–22	Bulgarian Second League	7	0	—		—		—		7	0
Botev Plovdiv	2021–22	Bulgarian First League	4	0	1	0	—		1 (Note: Appearances in the Bulgarian First League UECL play-offs)	0	6	0
Botev Plovdiv	2022–23	Bulgarian First League	27	0	2	0	2 (Note: Appearances in the UEFA Europa Conference League)	0	—		31	0
Botev Plovdiv	2023–24	Bulgarian First League	21	0	4	0	—		—		25	0
Botev Plovdiv	Total		52	0	7	0	2	0	1	0	62	0
Rostov	2024–25	Russian Premier League	2	0	1	0	—		—		3	0
Rostov	2025–26	Russian Premier League	2	0	0	0	—		—		2	0
Rostov	total		4	0	1	0	0	0	0	0	5	0
Career total			179	0	16	0	2	0	1	0	206	0
