= Stefan Melentijević =

Serbian footballer

Personal information
- Date of birth: 20 March 2004 (age 22)
- Place of birth: Herceg Novi, Serbia and Montenegro (now Montenegro)
- Height: 1.89 m (6 ft 2 in)
- Positions: Centre-back; defensive midfielder

Team information
- Current team: Novi Pazar
- Number: 5

Youth career
- –2022: Red Star Belgrade
- 2019–2021: → Grafičar Beograd (loan)

Senior career*
Years	Team	Apps	(Gls)
2022–2023	Radnički Beograd	15	(1)
2023–2025	Khimki	14	(0)
2025–2026	Primorje	22	(0)
2026–	Novi Pazar	4	(0)

International career^{‡}
2019	Serbia U16	2	(0)
2021	Serbia U18	1	(0)
2024–	Montenegro U21	16	(0)
- * Club domestic league appearances and goals as of 19 September 2026 ‡ National team caps and goals as of 5 October 2026

Stefan Melentijević (Serbian Cyrillic: Стефан Мелентијевић; born 20 March 2004) is a football player who plays as a centre-back or defensive midfielder for Serbian SuperLiga club Novi Pazar. Born in Serbia and Montenegro before it was dissolved, he represented Serbia internationally before switching allegiance to Montenegro.

== Club career ==
On 11 February 2023, Melentijević signed a three-and-a-half-year contract with Russian Premier League club Khimki. He made his RPL debut for Khimki on 12 March 2023 in a game against Zenit St. Petersburg.

== Career statistics ==
As of 29 March 2025

Club	Season	League			Cup		Continental		Total	
Club	Season	Division	Apps	Goals	Apps	Goals	Apps	Goals	Apps	Goals
Radnički Beograd	2022–23	Serbian First League	15	1	2	0	–		17	1
Khimki	2022–23	Russian Premier League	8	0	–		–		8	0
Khimki	2023–24	Russian First League	5	0	2	0	–		7	0
Khimki	2024–25	Russian Premier League	1	0	2	1	–		3	1
Khimki	Total		14	0	4	1	0	0	18	1
Career total			29	1	6	1	0	0	35	2
