= Maksim Radchenko =

Russian footballer (born 2007)

Personal information
- Full name: Maksim Romanovich Radchenko
- Date of birth: 15 June 2007 (age 19)
- Place of birth: Krylovskaya, Leningradsky District, Krasnodar Krai, Russia
- Height: 1.81 m (5 ft 11 in)
- Positions: Right-back; left-back

Team information
- Current team: Rostov/Rostov-2
- Number: 39

Youth career
- –2017: DYuSSh Yunost Krylovskaya
- 2017–2019: SSh Krasnodar
- 2019–2023: Rostov

Senior career*
Years	Team	Apps	(Gls)
2024–	Rostov	1	(0)
2024–	→ Rostov-2	45	(2)

International career^{‡}
2023	Russia U-16	4	(0)
2024	Russia U-17	3	(0)
2025	Russia U-18	2	(0)
2025–	Russia U-19	4	(0)
- * Club domestic league appearances and goals as of 31 October 2026 ‡ National team caps and goals as of 14 October 2025

Maksim Romanovich Radchenko (Russian: Максим Романович Радченко; born 15 June 2007) is a Russian football player who plays as a right-back or left-back for Rostov and Rostov-2.

== Career ==
Radchenko made his debut in the Russian Premier League for Rostov on 18 May 2025 in a game against Zenit St. Petersburg.

== Career statistics ==
As of 31 October 2026

Club	Season	League			Cup		Total	
Club	Season	Division	Apps	Goals	Apps	Goals	Apps	Goals
Rostov-2	2024	Russian Second League B	16	0	–		16	0
Rostov-2	2025	Russian Second League B	14	0	–		14	0
Rostov-2	2026	Russian Second League B	15	2	–		15	2
Rostov-2	Total		45	2	0	0	45	2
Rostov	2024–25	Russian Premier League	1	0	0	0	1	0
Rostov	2025–26	Russian Premier League	0	0	0	0	0	0
Rostov	2026–27	Russian Premier League	0	0	1	0	1	0
Rostov	Total		1	0	1	0	2	0
Career total			46	2	1	0	47	2
