= FC Rostov-2 =

Russian football team based in Rostov-on-Don

- Full name: Football Club Rostov-2
- Founded: 1992
- Ground: Olimp-2
- Capacity: 15,840
- Manager: Aleksei Yedunov
- League: Russian Second League, Division B, Group 1
- 2026: 3rd
- Website: fc-rostov.ru/ru

FC Rostov-2 (Russian: ФК «Ростов-2») is a Russian football team based in Rostov-on-Don. It is the reserves team for FC Rostov.

Rostov's reserve squad played professionally as FC Rostselmash-d Rostov-on-Don (Russian Second League in 1992–93, Russian Third League in 1996–97) and FC Rostselmash-2 Rostov-on-Don (Russian Second Division in 1998–2000). On 25 January 2024, the club was officially re-created and entered the Russian Second League Division B.

== Current squad ==
As of 11 September 2026, according to the Second League website.

Note: Flags indicate national team as defined under FIFA eligibility rules; some limited exceptions apply. Players may hold more than one non-FIFA nationality.

No.	Pos.	Nation	Player
—	GK	RUS	Stepan Safronov
23	FW	RUS	Eduard Akopyan
24	GK	RUS	Valery Gorbach
25	MF	RUS	Maksim Gorbunov
—	MF	RUS	Timur Aduyev
—	DF	RUS	Maksim Vanidovsky
29	FW	RUS	Artyom Logvinenko
31	DF	RUS	Georgy Kasheyev
32	DF	RUS	Nikita Levnikov
35	MF	RUS	Savely Galyuta
36	MF	RUS	Rinat Zhukov
37	MF	RUS	Kristian Mikhaylov
38	MF	RUS	Aleksandr Belukha
39	DF	RUS	Maksim Radchenko
41	DF	RUS	Bogdan Borisenko
44	DF	RUS	Aleksandr Zarigin
52	FW	RUS	Serafim Grozovsky

No.	Pos.	Nation	Player
53	DF	RUS	Maksim Zhukov
54	MF	RUS	Andrey Amosov
59	DF	RUS	Nikita Babakin
60	GK	RUS	Vadim Vlasov
61	FW	RUS	Vladimir Kasparyan
65	DF	RUS	Nikita Kolyuchkin
70	MF	RUS	Ruslan Shermatov
72	FW	RUS	Vadim Rassadin
75	DF	RUS	Alim Alimov
77	MF	RUS	Dmitry Shantaly
79	FW	RUS	Kirill Cheburakov
80	FW	RUS	Karim Madrakhimov
82	MF	RUS	Georgy Suanov
85	DF	RUS	Vladislav Khukhrovsky
86	MF	RUS	Ilya Zubenko
92	FW	RUS	Leonid Gayday
93	GK	RUS	Danil Ryazanov
94	MF	RUS	Marat Kovalkov
