= 2023–24 FC Lokomotiv Moscow season =

FC Lokomotiv Moscow
2023–24 season
- General director: Vladimir Leonchenko
- Head coach: Mikhail Galaktionov
- Stadium: RZD Arena
- Russian Premier League: 4th
- Russian Cup: Quarter-finals
- Top goalscorer: League: Nair Tiknizyan (6); All: Nair Tiknizyan (8)
- Highest home attendance: 7,820 vs Ural, 25 July 2023, Russian Cup
- Lowest home attendance: 6,720 vs Rubin Kazan, 22 July 2023, Russian Premier League
- Average home league attendance: 7,270
- Biggest win: 1–4 vs Fakel (A), 30 July 2023, Russian Premier League
- Biggest defeat: 4–1 vs CSKA Moscow (A), 5 August 2023, Russian Premier League
Home colours	Away colours	Third colours

The 2023–24 season was FC Lokomotiv Moscow's 102nd season in existence and 31st consecutive in the Russian Premier League. They also competed in the Russian Cup and the Russian Super Cup.

== Players ==
=== First-team squad ===
As of 14 September 2023

Note: Flags indicate national team as defined under FIFA eligibility rules; some limited exceptions apply. Players may hold more than one non-FIFA nationality.

No.	Pos.	Nation	Player
1	GK	RUS	Guilherme
3	DF	BRA	Lucas Fasson
4	DF	RUS	Stanislav Magkeyev
5	MF	GEO	Konstantin Maradishvili
6	MF	RUS	Dmitri Barinov
7	FW	RUS	Artem Dzyuba
8	FW	RUS	Vladislav Sarveli
9	MF	RUS	Sergei Pinyayev
11	MF	RUS	Anton Miranchuk
15	FW	RUS	Maksim Glushenkov
17	FW	RUS	Rifat Zhemaletdinov
20	DF	RUS	Ivan Kuzmichyov
21	DF	ALB	Mario Mitaj
22	GK	RUS	Ilya Lantratov

No.	Pos.	Nation	Player
24	DF	RUS	Maksim Nenakhov
27	FW	RUS	Vadim Rakov
43	MF	RUS	Mikhail Shchetinin
45	DF	RUS	Aleksandr Silyanov
53	GK	RUS	Daniil Khudyakov
59	DF	RUS	Yegor Pogostnov
69	MF	RUS	Daniil Kulikov
71	DF	ARM	Nair Tiknizyan
77	DF	RUS	Ilya Samoshnikov
85	DF	RUS	Yevgeny Morozov
88	MF	RUS	Ilya Berkovski
93	MF	RUS	Artyom Karpukas
94	MF	RUS	Dmitri Rybchinsky
99	FW	RUS	Timur Suleymanov (on loan from Nizhny Novgorod)

=== Out on loan ===
Note: Flags indicate national team as defined under FIFA eligibility rules; some limited exceptions apply. Players may hold more than one non-FIFA nationality.

No.	Pos.	Nation	Player
—	MF	RUS	Nikolai Titkov (at Orenburg until June 2024)
—	FW	RUS	Andrey Nikitin (at SKA-Khabarovsk until June 2024)
—	FW	FRA	Wilson Isidor (at Zenit Saint Petersburg until June 2024)
—	DF	CRO	Tin Jedvaj (at Panathinaikos until June 2024)
—	FW	MNE	Marko Rakonjac (at TSC until June 2024)

No.	Pos.	Nation	Player
—	FW	RUS	Roman Kolmakov (at Zenit-2 St. Petersburg until June 2024)
—	FW	BRA	Pedrinho (at América Mineiro until December 2023)
—	DF	UKR	Mark Mampassi (at Kortrijk until June 2024)
—	MF	SUR	Gyrano Kerk (at Royal Antwerp until June 2024)
—	DF	ARG	Germán Conti (at Colón until June 2024)

== Transfers ==
=== In ===
==== Summer ====
Date	Pos.	Player	From	Fee	Ref.
1 July 2023	LB	(Russia) Ilya Samoshnikov	(Russia) Rubin Kazan	Free transfer	
1 July 2023	ST	(Russia) Vladislav Sarveli	(Russia) Sochi	€1,000,000	

=== Loan in ===
==== Summer ====
Date	Pos.	Player	From	Until	Ref.
14 September 2023	ST	(Russia) Timur Suleymanov	(Russia) Nizhny Novgorod	30 June 2024	

=== Out ===
==== Summer ====
Date	Pos.	Player	To	Fee	Ref.
10 September 2023	ST	(France) Wilson Isidor	(Russia) Zenit Saint Petersburg	Loan	
12 September 2023	CM	(Russia) Sergei Babkin	(Russia) Krylia Sovetov Samara	€500,000	

== Pre-season and friendlies ==
26 June 2023 Friendly	Lokomotiv Moscow (Russia)	1–1	(Russia) Irtysh Omsk	Bakovka
17:00	Glushenkov 39'		Shleyermakher 89'	Stadium: Stadion Bakovka

30 June 2023 Friendly	Lokomotiv Moscow (Russia)	4–2	(Russia) Volgar Astrakhan	Bakovka
17:00	Pinyaev 3'; Rakov 15'; Dzyuba 29'; Batrakov 70'		Smirnov 45'; Zhamaletdinov 65'	Stadium: Stadion Bakovka

6 July 2023 Friendly	Lokomotiv Moscow (Russia)	0–1	(Russia) Baltika	Moscow
17:00			Barkov 53'	Stadium: RZD Arena

9 July 2023 Friendly	Lokomotiv Moscow (Russia)	3–0	(Russia) SKA-Khabarovsk	Moscow
17:00	Glushenkov 23'; Sarveli 74'; Silyanov 90'			Stadium: RZD Arena

14 July 2023 Friendly	Lokomotiv Moscow (Russia)	7–0	(Russia) Kvant Obninsk
17:00

== Competitions ==
=== Overall record ===
Competition	First match	Last match	Starting round	Final position	Record							
Competition	First match	Last match	Starting round	Final position	Pld	W	D	L	GF	GA	GD	Win %
Russian Premier League	22 July 2023	25 May 2024	Matchday 1	TBD	20	8	8	4	32	27	+5	40.00
Russian Cup	26 July 2023	14 March 2024	Group stage	Quarter-finals	8	4	3	1	12	6	+6	50.00
Total					28	12	11	5	44	33	+11	42.86

Last updated: 14 March 2024
Source: Soccerway

=== Russian Premier League ===
==== League table ====
Pos	Team	Pld	W	D	L	GF	GA	GD	Pts
2	Krasnodar	30	16	8	6	45	29	+16	56 (Note: Krasnodar is ahead of Dynamo on head-to-head points: Krasnodar 6, Dynamo 0)
3	Dynamo Moscow	30	16	8	6	53	39	+14	56
4	Lokomotiv Moscow	30	14	11	5	52	38	+14	53
5	Spartak Moscow	30	14	8	8	41	32	+9	50
6	CSKA Moscow	30	12	12	6	56	40	+16	48

Source: Premier Liga
Rules for classification: 1) Points; 2) Head-to-head points; 3) Head-to-head matches won; 4) Head-to-head goal difference; 5) Head-to-head goals scored; 6) Matches won; 7) Goal difference; 8) Goals scored; 9) 2022–23 position (not applicable to final standings); 10) Play-off. Note: if teams tied on points played an equal number of head-to-head games, head-to-head results are considered in aggregate, in a separate 'table'. If teams tied on points played a different number of head-to-head games, head-to-head criteria are considered in one-on-one pairs for each team against each other, then the teams are ordered by the number of one-on-one matchups they have advantage in.

==== Results summary ====
Overall								Home						Away					
Pld	W	D	L	GF	GA	GD	Pts	W	D	L	GF	GA	GD	W	D	L	GF	GA	GD
20	8	8	4	32	27	+5	32	5	5	1	17	12	+5	3	3	3	15	15	0

Last updated: 10 March 2024.

==== Results by round ====
Round	1	2	3	4	5	6	7	8	9	10	11	12	13	14	15	16	17	18	19	20	21
Ground	H	A	A	H	A	A	H	H	A	H	A	H	A	H	H	A	H	H	A	H	H
Result	D	W	L	D	D	W	W	L	W	W	D	D	L	D	W	D	W	W	L	D	
Position	9	3	7	9	11	8	6	8	6	3	4	4	6	6	7	7	6	4	4	5	

Updated to match(es) played on 10 March 2024. Source:
A = Away; H = Home; W = Win; D = Draw; L = Loss

==== Matches ====
The league fixtures were unveiled on 24 June 2023.

22 July 2023 1	Lokomotiv Moscow	2–2	Rubin Kazan	Moscow
17:30 MSK (UTC+3)	Dzyuba (yellow card) 21'; Tiknizyan 23'; Isidor 88'	Report	Daku 3'; Fameyeh 58'; Gritsayenko (yellow card) 72'	Stadium: RZD Arena; Attendance: 6,720; Referee: Vladislav Bezborodov

30 July 2023 2	Fakel Voronezh	1–4	Lokomotiv Moscow	Voronezh
17:30 MSK (UTC+3)	Appaev (yellow card) 13'; Markov 33'; Bozhin (yellow card) 69'; Bagamaev (yellow card) 83'	Report	Dzyuba 12'; Pogostnov (yellow card) 24'; Tiknizyan 60', 89'; Pinyaev (yellow card) 66', (goal) 67'; Lantratov (yellow card) 84'	Stadium: Tsentralnyi Profsoyuz Stadion; Attendance: 13,085; Referee: Vasili Kazartsev

5 August 2023 3	CSKA Moscow	4–1	Lokomotiv Moscow	Moscow
20:00 MSK (UTC+3)	Chalov 29' (pen.); Gajić 31'; Mukhin 55', 63'	Report	Barinov (yellow card) 13'; Pogostnov 62'	Stadium: VEB Arena; Attendance: 12,560; Referee: Kirill Levnikov

12 August 2023 4	Lokomotiv Moscow	1–1	Krylia Sovetov Samara	Moscow
15:00 MSK (UTC+3)	Pinyaev (yellow card) 45'; Fasson (yellow card) 85'; Isidor (yellow card) 90+1'; Maradishvili 90+3'	Report	Garré 60'; Rasskazov 86'; Costanza (yellow card) 90+4'	Stadium: RZD Arena; Attendance: 6,763; Referee: Pavel Kukuyan

19 August 2023 5	Krasnodar	1–1	Lokomotiv Moscow	Krasnodar
19:30 MSK (UTC+3)	Spertsyan 22'; Olaza (yellow card) 39'; Akhmetov 47'; Chernikov (yellow card) 90+3'	Report	Zhemaletdinov (yellow card) 54'; Miranchuk 90+8'	Stadium: Krasnodar Stadium; Attendance: 22,492; Referee: Yevgeni Kukulyak

27 August 2023 6	Sochi	0–1	Lokomotiv Moscow	Sochi
20:00 MSK (UTC+3)	Noboa (yellow card) 31'	Report	Barinov (yellow card) 38'; Rybchinsky (yellow card) 45+2'; Glushenkov 57'; Nenakhov (yellow card) 81'	Stadium: Fisht Olympic Stadium; Attendance: 6,089; Referee: Lubomir Suchy

3 September 2023 7	Lokomotiv Moscow	3–2	Baltika Kaliningrad	Moscow
15:15 MSK (UTC+3)	Dzyuba 9'; Karpukas (yellow card) 15'; Miranchuk 17'; Barinov 34'	Report	Radmanovac (yellow card) 20'; Guzina 50'; Pryakhin 65'	Stadium: RZD Arena; Attendance: 7,652; Referee: Artem Lyubimov

17 September 2023 8	Lokomotiv Moscow	0–2	Orenburg	Moscow
19:00 MSK (UTC+3)		Report	Bašić 85'; Gojković (yellow card) 88'; Vorobyev 90+4', (yellow card) 90+5'	Stadium: RZD Arena; Attendance: 5,957; Referee: Artur Fedorov

24 September 2023 9	Zenit Saint Petersburg	1–2	Lokomotiv Moscow	Saint Petersburg
16:30 MSK (UTC+3)	Cassierra 22', (yellow card) 29'; Rodrigão (yellow card) 88'; Sergeev (yellow card) 90+7'; Wendel (yellow card) 90+7'	Report	Miranchuk (yellow card) 40'; Glushenkov 60' (yellow card) 90+5'; Tiknizyan 90+1' (yellow card) 90+3' (yellow-red card) 90+7'	Stadium: Gazprom Arena; Attendance: 36,283; Referee: Vladimir Moskalev

30 September 2023 10	Lokomotiv Moscow	1–0	Nizhny Novgorod	Moscow
14:15 MSK (UTC+3)	Glushenkov (yellow card) 60'; Zhemaletdinov 83'; Karpukas (yellow card) 90+5'	Report	Aleksandrov (yellow card) 14'; Troshechkin (yellow card) 65'; Gotsuk (yellow card) 74'	Stadium: RZD Arena; Attendance: 6,059; Referee: Vladislav Bezborodov

7 October 2023 11	Ural	2–2	Lokomotiv Moscow	Yekaterinburg
14:00 YEKT (UTC+5)	Begić 12', (yellow card) 28'; Schettine (yellow card) 39'; Bicfalvi 53'; Beveev (yellow card) 90'	Report	Dzyuba 5', (yellow card) 90'; Suleymanov (yellow card) 90', (goal) 90+6'; Mitaj (yellow card) 90+7'	Stadium: Yekaterinburg Arena; Attendance: 10,505; Referee: Sergey Karasev

21 October 2023 12	Lokomotiv Moscow	0–0	Dynamo Moscow	Moscow
16:30 MSK (UTC+3)		Report		Stadium: RZD Arena; Attendance: 9,842; Referee: Sergey Ivanov

28 October 2023 13	Rostov	1–0	Lokomotiv Moscow	Rostov-on-Don
16:30 MSK (UTC+3)	Shchetinin 3'; Melehin (yellow card) 24'	Report	Barinov (yellow card) 48'; Nenakhov (yellow card) 55'	Stadium: Rostov Arena; Attendance: 11,487; Referee: Patrick Suchy

5 November 2023 14	Lokomotiv Moscow	1–1	Spartak Moscow	Moscow
19:30 MSK (UTC+3)	Barinov (yellow card) 45+1'; Miranchuk (yellow card) 49'; Dzyuba 64'	Report	Khlusevich (red card) 38'; Zinkovsky 53'; Ignatov (yellow card) 60'	Stadium: RZD Arena; Attendance: 14,523; Referee: Pavel Kukuyan

11 November 2023 15	Lokomotiv Moscow	2–1	Akhmat Grozny	Moscow
16:30 MSK (UTC+3)	Tiknizyan (yellow card) 35'; Dzyuba (yellow card) 68'; Mitaj (yellow card) 72' (yellow-red card) 90+1'; Glushenkov 80'; Suleymanov 81'	Report	Shvets (yellow card) 4'; Iljin (yellow card) 30'; Daniel Júnior (yellow card) 35'; Konaté 66'; Oleynikov (yellow card) 74'	Stadium: RZD Arena; Attendance: 27,084; Referee: Yevgeni Kukulyak

25 November 2023 16	Krylia Sovetov Samara	3–3	Lokomotiv Moscow	Samara
13:00 SAMT (UTC+4)	Soldatenkov (yellow card) 3'; Costanza 32', (yellow card) 48'; Garré (yellow card) 57', (goal) 90+12'; Gorshkov (yellow card) 72'; Pisarskiy 90+4'	Report	Glushenkov (yellow card) 14'; Karpukas (yellow card) 23'; Pinyaev 30'; Miranchuk (yellow card) 33'; Zhemaletdinov 62', 84'; Barinov (yellow card) 90'	Stadium: Solidarnost Samara Arena; Attendance: 5,924; Referee: Vasili Kazartsev

3 December 2023 17	Lokomotiv Moscow	3–1	Zenit Saint Petersburg	Moscow
17:00 MSK (UTC+3)	Glushenkov 8', 60'; Pinyaev (yellow card) 63'; Nenakhov (yellow card) 71'; Maradishvili (yellow card) 83'; Tiknizyan 88'	Report	Cassierra 41'; Eraković (yellow card) 90+1'	Stadium: RZD Arena; Attendance: 10,060; Referee: Aleksey Sukhoy

8 December 2023 18	Lokomotiv Moscow	2–0	Ural	Moscow
19:00 MSK (UTC+3)	Morozov 18'; Nenakhov (yellow card) 31'; Mitaj (yellow card) 58'; Suleymanov (yellow card) 90'; Tiknizyan 90'	Report	Ítalo 51'; Ayupov (yellow card) 65'	Stadium: RZD Arena; Attendance: 3,289; Referee: Artyom Chistyakov

3 March 2024 19	Dynamo Moscow	2–1	Lokomotiv Moscow	Moscow
16:30 MSK (UTC+3)	Bitello 12'; Laxalt (yellow card) 26'; Makarov 58'; Balbuena (yellow card) 83'; Fernández (yellow card) 87'	Report	Morozov (yellow card) 30'; Silyanov (yellow card) 64'; Samoshnikov (yellow card) 72'; Zhemaletdinov 85'; Nyamsi (yellow card) 90+3'	Stadium: VTB Arena; Attendance: 14,170; Referee: Kirill Levnikov

10 March 2024 20	Lokomotiv Moscow	2–2	Sochi	Moscow
16:30 MSK (UTC+3)	Zhemaletdinov 2'; Karpukas (red card) 52'; Glushenkov 42'; Barino (yellow card) 47'; Pinyaev (yellow card) 90+2'	Report	Yusupov 4'; Medveděv (yellow card) 21'; Alves 51'; Saavedra (yellow card) 65'; Córdova (red card) 75'	Stadium: RZD Arena; Attendance: 6,024; Referee: Sergey Cheban

30 March 2024 20	Lokomotiv Moscow	v	Krasnodar	Moscow
16:00 MSK (UTC+3)		Report		Stadium: RZD Arena

=== Russian Cup ===
25 July 2023 1	Lokomotiv Moscow	2–1	Ural Yekaterinbutg	Moscow
18:30 MSK (UTC+3)	Isidor 34'; Tiknizyan 49'; Glushenkov (yellow card) 82'; Barinov (yellow card) 83'	Report	Ayupov 8' (yellow card) 54'; Mamin (yellow card) 80'	Stadium: RZD Arena; Attendance: 7,820; Referee: Artur Fyodorov

8 August 2023 2	Rubin Kazan	0–1	Lokomotiv Moscow	Kazan
18:30 MSK (UTC+3)	Lisakovich (yellow card) 29'; Vujačić (yellow card) 45+1'; Rakhmonaliev (yellow card) 48'; Teslenko (yellow card) 73'; Ashurmatov (yellow card) 85'	Report	Miranchuk (yellow card) 10'; Samoshnikov (yellow card) 17'; Barinov (yellow card) 54'; Sarveli 63'	Stadium: Kazan Arena; Attendance: 9,243; Referee: Vladimir Moskalev

30 August 2023 3	Rostov	2–1	Lokomotiv Moscow	Rostov
19:30 MSK (UTC+3)	Prokhin (yellow card) 12'; Golenkov 24', (yellow card) 52'; Vakhaniya 37'; Sukhomlinov (yellow card) 40'; Utkin (yellow card) 57'; Glebov (yellow card) 87'	Report	Kuzmichev (yellow card) 4'; Glushenkov 71'	Stadium: Rostov Arena; Attendance: 15,525; Referee: Vladislav Bezborodov

20 September 2023 4	Ural	0–0 (4–2 p)	Lokomotiv Moscow	Yekaterinburg
17:00 YEKT (UTC+5)		Report	Nenakhov (yellow card) 78'; Morozov (yellow card) 86'	Stadium: Yekaterinburg Arena; Attendance: 11,722; Referee: Sergei Karasev
	Penalties
	Schettine (penalty scored); Bicfalvi (penalty scored); Alves (penalty scored); Miškić (penalty scored); Sungatulin (penalty scored)		Mitaj (penalty missed); Glushenkov (penalty scored); Zhemaletdinov (penalty scored); Nababkin (penalty missed); Silyanov (penalty scored)

3 October 2023 5	Lokomotiv Moscow	3–1	Rostov	Moscow
17:15 MSK (UTC+3)	Suleymanov 34'; Morozov (yellow card) 36'; Miranchuk 39'; Glushenkov 59'	Report	Prokhin (yellow card) 46'; Osipenko (yellow card) 64', (goal) 89'	Stadium: RZD Arena; Attendance: 7,175; Referee: Artem Lyubimov

1 November 2023 6	Lokomotiv Moscow	3–0	Rubin Kazan	Moscow
18:30 MSK (UTC+3)	Tiknizyan 9'; Miranchuk 26'; Sarveli 37'; Kulikov (yellow card) 40'; Maradishvili (yellow card) 42'; Sarveli (yellow card) 60'	Report	Fameyeh (yellow card) 22'	Stadium: RZD Arena; Attendance: 8,166; Referee: Vera Opeykina

28 November 2023 First leg	Baltika	2–2	Lokomotiv Moscow	Kaliningrad
17:15 KAT (UTC+2)	Malyarov (yellow card) 49'; Avanesyan 65'; Gassama 70'; Musaev (yellow card) 83'	Report	Suleymanov 16', 90+3'; Nenakhov (yellow card) 78'	Stadium: Rostec Arena; Attendance: 5,702; Referee: Sergey Cheban

14 March 2024 Second leg	Lokomotiv Moscow	1–1 (3–3 agg.) (7–8 p)	Baltika	Kaliningrad
18:00 MSK (UTC+3)	Tiknizyan 3'; Nyamsi (yellow card) 59'; Samoshnikov (yellow card) 66'; Morozov (yellow card) 83'	Report	Kozlov 53'; Luna (yellow card) 90+1'	Stadium: Rostec Arena; Attendance: 5,702; Referee: Sergey Cheban
	Penalties
	An. Miranchuk (penalty scored); Suleymanov (penalty scored); Barinov (penalty scored); Nenakhov (penalty scored); Dzyuba (penalty missed); Nyamsi (penalty scored); Morozov (penalty scored); Pinyaev (penalty missed)		Zhirov (penalty scored); Kaplenko (penalty missed); Bistrović (penalty scored); Kuzmin (penalty scored); Fameyeh (penalty scored); Andrade (penalty scored); Kozlov (penalty scored); Luna (penalty scored)
