= 2024–25 FC Lokomotiv Moscow season =

FC Lokomotiv Moscow
2024–25 season
- Manager: Mikhail Galaktionov
- Stadium: Lokomotiv Stadium
- Russian Premier League: 6th
- Russian Cup: RPL path semi-final
- Top goalscorer: League: Aleksey Batrakov (14); All: Aleksey Batrakov (15)
- Average home league attendance: 10,466

The 2024–25 season was the 103rd season in the history of FC Lokomotiv Moscow, and the club's 33rd consecutive season in the Russian top division. In addition to the domestic league, the team participated in the Russian Cup.

== Transfers ==
=== In ===
Pos.	Player	Transferred from	Fee	Date	Source
FW	(Russia) Dmitry Vorobyov	(Russia) Orenburg	€2,500,000	1 July 2024	
MF	(Russia) Artyom Timofeyev	(Russia) Akhmat Grozny	Free	4 July 2024	
DF	(Belarus) Arseni Ageev	(Belarus) Arsenal Dzyarzhynsk	Undisclosed	11 July 2024	

=== Out ===
Pos.	Player	Transferred to	Fee	Date	Source
FW	(Russia) Anton Miranchuk		End of contract	1 July 2024	
GK	(Russia) Guilherme Marinato		End of contract	1 July 2024	
FW	(Russia) Maksim Glushenkov	(Russia) Zenit Saint Petersburg	600 million ₽	1 July 2024	
FW	(Montenegro) Marko Rakonjac	(Hungary) Diósgyőri VTK	Loan	2 July 2024	
GK	(Russia) Daniil Khudyakov	(Austria) Sturm Graz	€340,000	22 July 2024	

== Friendlies ==
=== Pre-season ===
26 June 2024 Friendly	Lokomotiv Moscow (Russia)	2–1	(Russia) Arsenal Tula	Bakovka
17:00	Sarveli 41'; Vorobyov 43'		Sukhanov 56'	Stadium: Stadion Bakovka

30 June 2024 Friendly	Lokomotiv Moscow (Russia)	0–1	(Russia) Rodina Moscow	Bakovka
12:00			Yushin 20'	Stadium: Stadion Bakovka

6 July 2024 Friendly	Lokomotiv Moscow (Russia)	4–1	(Russia) Baltika Kaliningrad
18:00 UTC+3

10 July 2024 Friendly	Lokomotiv Moscow (Russia)	1–1	(Serbia) FK Partizan
15:30 UTC+3	Kovačević 90+3' (o.g.)		Matheus Saldanha 31'

13 July 2024 Friendly	Lokomotiv Moscow (Russia)	3–4	(Russia) Rubin Kazan	Moscow
17:30 UTC+3				Stadium: RZD Arena

=== Mid-season ===
20 January 2025 Friendly	Lokomotiv Moscow (Russia)	1–2	(China) Shanghai Port

24 January 2025 Friendly	Lokomotiv Moscow (Russia)	0–1	(South Korea) Ulsan HD

== Competitions ==
=== Overall record ===
Competition	First match	Last match	Starting round	Record							
Competition	First match	Last match	Starting round	Pld	W	D	L	GF	GA	GD	Win %
Russian Premier League	20 July 2024	24 May 2025	Matchday 1	1	1	0	0	3	2	+1	100.00
Russian Cup	30 July 2024			0	0	0	0	0	0	+0	—
Total				1	1	0	0	3	2	+1	100.00

Last updated: 20 July 2024
Source: Soccerway

=== Russian Premier League ===
==== League table ====
Pos	Team	Pld	W	D	L	GF	GA	GD	Pts
4	Spartak Moscow	30	17	6	7	56	25	+31	57
5	Dynamo Moscow	30	16	8	6	61	35	+26	56
6	Lokomotiv Moscow	30	15	8	7	51	41	+10	53
7	Rubin Kazan	30	13	6	11	42	45	−3	45
8	Rostov	30	10	9	11	41	43	−2	39

Source: Premier Liga
Rules for classification: 1) Points; 2) Head-to-head points; 3) Head-to-head matches won; 4) Head-to-head goal difference; 5) Head-to-head goals scored; 6) Matches won; 7) Goal difference; 8) Goals scored; 9) 2023–24 position (not applicable to final standings); 10) Play-off. Note: if teams tied on points did not play an equal number of head-to-head games, head-to-head results are not considered for the standings.

==== Results summary ====
Overall								Home						Away					
Pld	W	D	L	GF	GA	GD	Pts	W	D	L	GF	GA	GD	W	D	L	GF	GA	GD
22	12	4	6	38	34	+4	40	8	1	2	19	14	+5	4	3	4	19	20	−1

Last updated: 28 March 2025.
Source: soccerway

==== Results by round ====
Round	1	2	3	4	5	6	7	8	9	10	11	12	13	14	15	16	17	18	19	20	21	22	23	24	25	26	27	28	29	30
Ground	H	A	A	H	A	H	H	A	A	H	H	A	A	H	H	A	H	A	A	H	H	A	H	A	H	A	H	A	H	A
Result	W	L	W	W	W	W	L	W	W	W	W	L	D	W	W	L	L	D	D	D	W	L								
Position	5	8	4	2	2	1	3	3	3	2	2	3	3	3	3	3	4	5	5	5	4	6								

A = Away; H = Home; W = Win; D = Draw; L = Loss

==== Matches ====
The match schedule was released on 20 June 2024.

20 July 2024 1	Lokomotiv Moscow	3–2	Akron Tolyatti	Moscow
15:00 UTC+3	Pinyaev 28'; Batrakov 38', (yellow card) 86'; Barinov (yellow card) 45+2'; Vorobyev 79'	Report	Bakaev 36'; Eldarushev 40'; Danilin (yellow card) 45+2'; Palienko (yellow card) 55'; Dimoski (yellow card) 63'	Stadium: RZD Arena; Attendance: 7,520; Referee: Vladimir Moskalev

27 July 2024 2	Dynamo Moscow	3-1	Lokomotiv Moscow	Moscow
17:30 UTC+3	Gagnidze 12' (yellow card) 62'; Majstorović 59'; Ngamaleu 85'	Report	Batrakov (yellow card) 25'; Lucas Fasson (yellow card) 37'; Vorobyov 39'; Pinyayev (yellow card) 64'	Stadium: VTB Arena; Attendance: 15,196; Referee: (Russia) Sergei Karasev

4 August 2024 3	Akhmat Grozny	0-5	Lokomotiv Moscow	Grozny
20:30 MSK	Šatara (yellow card) 39'; Ghandri (yellow card) 51'	Report	Vorobyov 7' (pen.) (yellow card) 51'; Nyamsi 17' 36'; Nenakhov (yellow card) 28'; Silyanov (yellow card) 52'; Tiknizyan (yellow card) 56'; Suleymanov (yellow card) 76'; Rakov 79'; Batrakov 90+1'	Stadium: Akhmat-Arena; Attendance: 5,336; Referee: (Russia) Artem Chistyakov

10 August 2024 4	Lokomotiv Moscow	2-0	Dynamo Makhachkala	Moscow
15:00 MSK	Samoshnikov 10'; Morozov 64' (yellow card) 89'	Report	Sundukov (yellow card) 53'	Stadium: RZD Arena; Attendance: 8,587; Referee: (Russia) Evgeniy Kukulyak

18 August 2024 5	CSKA Moscow	0-1	Lokomotiv Moscow	Moscow
17:30 MSK	Gajić (yellow card) 23'; Musayev (yellow card) 28'	Report	Morozov (yellow card) 30'; Karpukas (yellow card) 38'; Rakov (yellow card) 88'; Tiknizyan 90'	Stadium: VEB Arena; Attendance: 17,150; Referee: (Russia) Kirill Levnikov

25 August 2024 6	Lokomotiv Moscow	3-2	Rostov	Moscow
20:00 MSK	Batrakov 10'; Samoshnikov 37'; Tiknizyan 46'; Rakov (yellow card) 67'; Karpukas (yellow card) 72'; Sarveli (yellow card) 90+1'	Report	Ronaldo 13' 90+6'; Kuchayev (yellow card) 41'; Glebov (yellow card) 90+7'	Stadium: RZD Arena; Attendance: 8,626; Referee: (Russia) Vladimir Moskalyov

=== Russian Cup ===
==== Group stage ====
30 July 2024 1	Lokomotiv Moscow	1-0	Rostov	Moscow
18:30	Karpukas (yellow card) 11'; Rakov 78'	Report	Melyokhin (yellow card) 10'	Stadium: RZD Arena; Attendance: 11,250; Referee: (Russia) Ranel Ziyakov

13 August 2024 2	Orenburg	2–3	Lokomotiv Moscow	Orenburg
17:30	Cuero 15' (pen.) 53' (yellow card) 74'; Prokhin (yellow card) 85'; Kasimov (yellow card) 90+4'	Report	Suleymanov 8' (pen.) 36'; Pogostnov (yellow card) 19'; Nenakhov (yellow card) 45+3'; Rakov (yellow card) 77' (goal) 82'	Stadium: Gazovik Stadium; Attendance: 5,294; Referee: (Russia) Evgeniy Bulanov

28 August 2024 3	Lokomotiv Moscow	4-0	Khimki	Moscow
19:30	Pogostnov 4'; Suleymanov 43' 57'; Radikovsky 81'	Report	Terekhov (yellow card) 52'	Stadium: RZD Arena; Attendance: 12,011; Referee: (Russia) Artem Lyubimov

17 September 2024 4	Khimki	v	Lokomotiv Moscow	Khimki

1 October 2024 5	Lokomotiv Moscow	v	Orenburg	Moscow
				Stadium: RZD Arena

22 October 2024 6	Rostov	v	Lokomotiv Moscow	Rostov
