= Aleksandr Silyanov =

Russian footballer (born 2001)

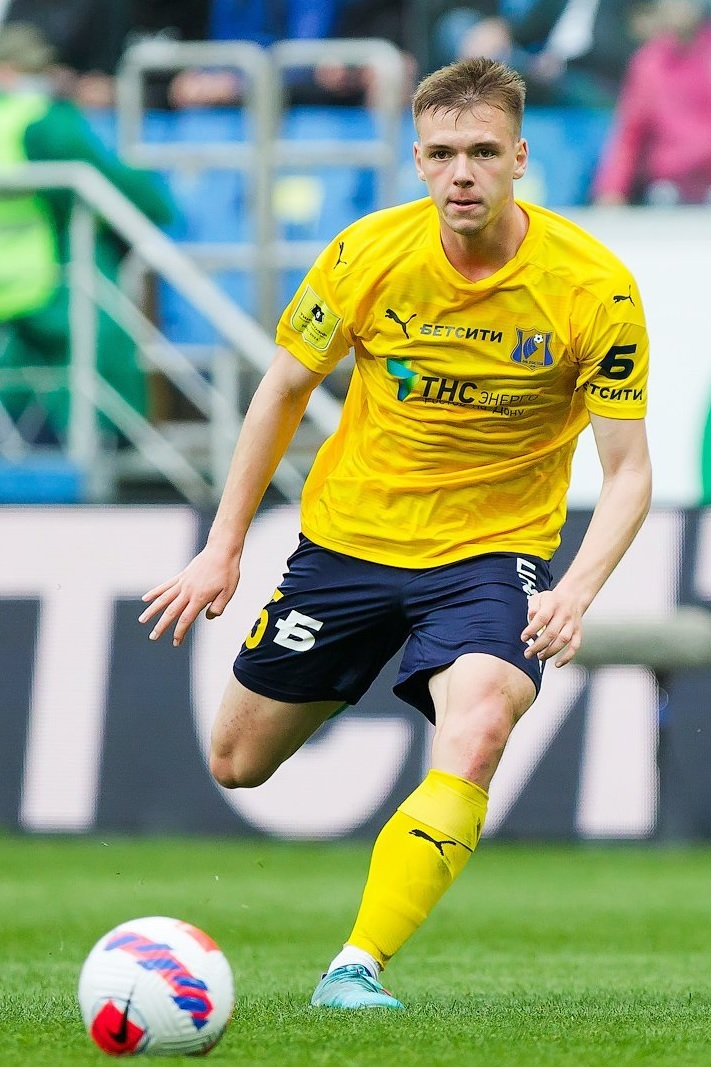
- Silyanov with Rostov in 2022

Personal information
- Full name: Aleksandr Kirillovich Silyanov
- Date of birth: 17 February 2001 (age 25)
- Place of birth: Moscow, Russia
- Height: 1.85 m (6 ft 1 in)
- Positions: Right-back; centre-back

Team information
- Current team: Lokomotiv Moscow
- Number: 45

Youth career
- CSKA Moscow

Senior career*
Years	Team	Apps	(Gls)
2019–2021	Kazanka Moscow	17	(2)
2020–	Lokomotiv Moscow	100	(6)
2022–2023	→ Rostov (loan)	42	(2)

International career^{‡}
2017–2018	Russia U-17	8	(1)
2020	Russia U-19	1	(0)
2021	Russia U-21	5	(0)
2022–	Russia	19	(2)
- * Club domestic league appearances and goals as of 22 November 2026 ‡ National team caps and goals as of 12 November 2026

Aleksandr Kirillovich Silyanov (Russian: Александр Кириллович Сильянов; born 17 February 2001) is a Russian football player who plays as a right-back or centre-back for Lokomotiv Moscow and the Russia national team.

== Club career ==
He made his debut for the senior squad of Lokomotiv Moscow on 9 December 2020 in a Champions League game against Bayern Munich, he substituted Dmitri Rybchinsky in the 88th minute.

He made his Russian Premier League debut for Lokomotiv on 11 April 2021 in a game against Spartak Moscow, as a starter.

On 18 January 2022, he joined Rostov on loan until the end of the 2021–22 season. The loan was renewed for the 2022–23 season on 4 July 2022.

On 9 June 2025, Silyanov extended his contract with Lokomotiv to 2029.

== International career ==
Silyanov was called up to the Russia national football team for the first time for a friendly against Kyrgyzstan in September 2022. He made his debut in that game on 24 September 2022.

== Career statistics ==
=== Club ===
As of match played 22 November 2026

Appearances and goals by club, season and competition
Club	Season	League			Cup		Europe		Other		Total	
Club	Season	Division	Apps	Goals	Apps	Goals	Apps	Goals	Apps	Goals	Apps	Goals
Kazanka Moscow	2019–20	Russian Second League	11	0	—		—		—		11	0
Kazanka Moscow	2020–21	Russian Second League	6	2	—		—		—		6	2
Kazanka Moscow	Total		17	2	0	0	0	0	0	0	17	2
Lokomotiv Moscow	2020–21	Russian Premier League	2	0	0	0	1 (Note: Appearance in the UEFA Champions League)	0	0	0	3	0
Lokomotiv Moscow	2021–22	Russian Premier League	8	0	0	0	2 (Note: Appearances in the UEFA Europa League)	0	1 (Note: Appearance in the Russian Super Cup)	0	11	0
Lokomotiv Moscow	2023–24	Russian Premier League	23	2	4	0	—		—		27	2
Lokomotiv Moscow	2024–25	Russian Premier League	26	1	10	0	—		—		36	1
Lokomotiv Moscow	2025–26	Russian Premier League	28	2	7	1	—		—		35	3
Lokomotiv Moscow	2026–27	Russian Premier League	13	1	4	1	—		—		17	2
Lokomotiv Moscow	Total		100	6	25	2	3	0	1	0	129	8
Rostov (loan)	2021–22	Russian Premier League	12	0	—		—		—		12	0
Rostov (loan)	2022–23	Russian Premier League	30	2	8	0	—		—		38	2
Rostov (loan)	Total		42	2	8	0	0	0	0	0	50	2
Career total			159	10	33	2	3	0	1	0	196	12

=== International ===
As of match played 12 November 2026

Appearances and goals by national team and year
National team	Year	Apps	Goals
Russia	2022	2	0
Russia	2023	5	1
Russia	2024	1	0
Russia	2025	6	0
Russia	2026	5	1
Total		19	2

==== International goals ====
Scores and results list Russia's goal tally first.

No.	Date	Venue	Opponent	Score	Result	Competition
1	20 November 2023	Volgograd Arena, Volgograd, Russia	Cuba	4–0	8–0	Friendly
2	9 June 2026	Kaliningrad Stadium, Kaliningrad, Russia	Trinidad and Tobago	2–0	3–0	Friendly
