= Timur Suleymanov =

Russian footballer (born 2000)

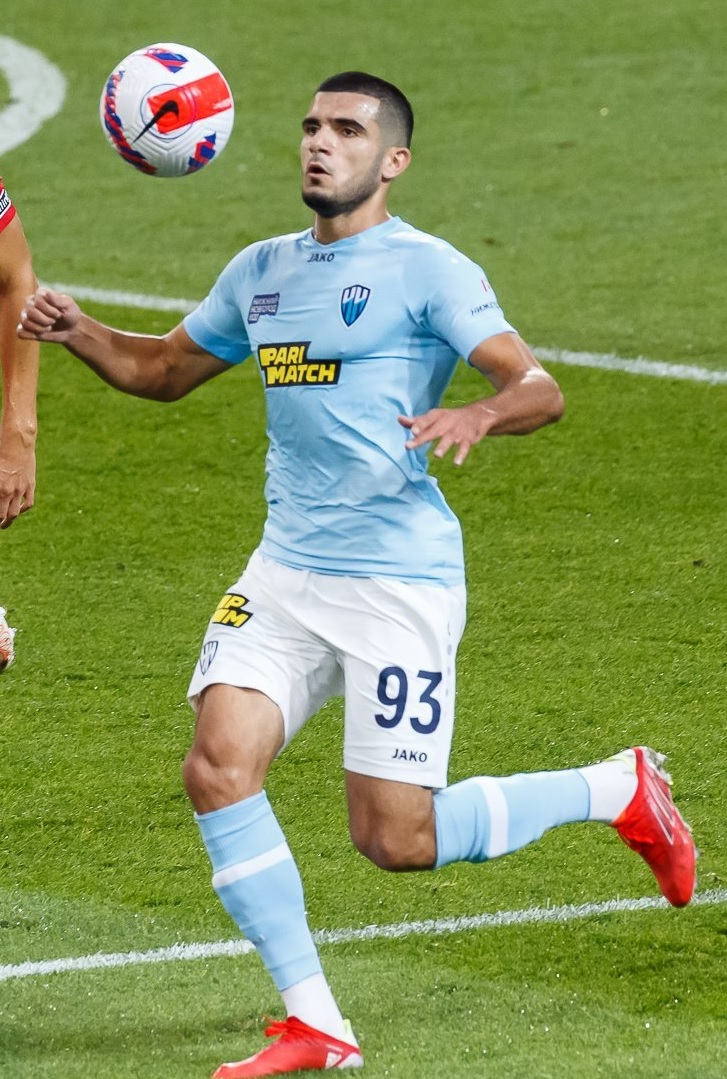
- Suleymanov with FC Nizhny Novgorod in 2021

Personal information
- Full name: Timur Igramutdinovich Suleymanov
- Date of birth: 17 March 2000 (age 26)
- Place of birth: Derbent, Russia
- Height: 1.84 m (6 ft 0 in)
- Position: Forward

Team information
- Current team: Rostov
- Number: 99

Youth career
- –2015: SShOR-27 Sokol Moscow
- 2015–2020: Lokomotiv Moscow

Senior career*
| Years | Team | Apps | (Gls) |
| 2019–2021 | Lokomotiv Moscow | 4 | (0) |
| 2019–2020 | Kazanka Moscow | 13 | (4) |
| 2020–2021 | → Nizhny Novgorod (loan) | 38 | (9) |
| 2021–2024 | Pari Nizhny Novgorod | 60 | (12) |
| 2023–2024 | → Lokomotiv Moscow (loan) | 22 | (7) |
| 2024–2025 | Lokomotiv Moscow | 29 | (1) |
| 2025– | Rostov | 43 | (7) |

International career^{‡}
| 2019 | Russia U-19 | 1 | (0) |
| 2019 | Russia U-20 | 4 | (3) |
| 2021 | Russia U-21 | 5 | (1) |
- * Club domestic league appearances and goals as of 20 November 2026 ‡ National team caps and goals as of 16 November 2021

Timur Igramutdinovich Suleymanov (Russian: Тимур Играмутдинович Сулейманов; born 17 March 2000) is a Russian football player who plays as a centre-forward for Rostov.

== Club career ==
Suleymanov made his debut in the Russian Professional Football League for Kazanka Moscow on 17 July 2019 in a game against Kolomna.

He made his Russian Premier League debut for Lokomotiv Moscow on 11 August 2019 in a game against Ural Yekaterinburg, as an 85th-minute substitute for Aleksei Miranchuk.

On 29 July 2020, Suleymanov joined Nizhny Novgorod on loan for the 2020–21 season.

On 26 June 2021, he moved to Nizhny Novgorod on a permanent basis. He scored his first Russian Premier League goal for Nizhny Novgorod on 1 August 2021 in a 1–1 away draw against Ural Yekaterinburg.

On 17 March 2023, Suleymanov extended his contract with Pari Nizhny Novgorod (as Nizhny Novgorod was renamed by then) until the end of the 2025–26 season.

On 14 September 2023, Suleymanov returned to Lokomotiv Moscow on loan with an option to buy. On 1 March 2024, Lokomotiv made the transfer permanent and signed a contract with Suleymanov until June 2027, effective at the end of the season.

On 21 June 2025, Suleymanov moved to Rostov.

== Career statistics ==
As of match played 20 November 2026

Appearances and goals by club, season and competition
| Club | Season | League | | | Cup | | Europe | | Other | | Total | |
| Club | Season | Division | Apps | Goals | Apps | Goals | Apps | Goals | Apps | Goals | Apps | Goals |
|---|---|---|---|---|---|---|---|---|---|---|---|---|
| Kazanka Moscow | 2019–20 | Russian Second League | 13 | 4 | — | | — | | — | | 13 | 4 |
| Lokomotiv Moscow | 2019–20 | Russian Premier League | 4 | 0 | 0 | 0 | 0 | 0 | 0 | 0 | 4 | 0 |
| Nizhny Novgorod (loan) | 2020–21 | Russian First League | 38 | 9 | 2 | 0 | — | | — | | 40 | 9 |
| Nizhny Novgorod | 2021–22 | Russian Premier League | 25 | 1 | 1 | 0 | — | | — | | 26 | 1 |
| Nizhny Novgorod | 2022–23 | Russian Premier League | 28 | 10 | 6 | 2 | — | | 2 (Note: Appearances in relegation play-off) | 0 | 36 | 12 |
| Nizhny Novgorod | 2023–24 | Russian Premier League | 7 | 1 | 3 | 2 | — | | — | | 10 | 3 |
| Nizhny Novgorod | Total | | 60 | 12 | 10 | 4 | — | | 2 | 0 | 72 | 16 |
| Lokomotiv Moscow (loan) | 2023–24 | Russian Premier League | 22 | 7 | 6 | 3 | — | | — | | 28 | 10 |
| Lokomotiv Moscow | 2024–25 | Russian Premier League | 29 | 1 | 11 | 6 | — | | — | | 40 | 7 |
| Rostov | 2025–26 | Russian Premier League | 28 | 4 | 5 | 0 | — | | — | | 33 | 4 |
| Rostov | 2026–27 | Russian Premier League | 15 | 3 | 3 | 0 | — | | — | | 18 | 3 |
| Rostov | Total | | 43 | 7 | 8 | 0 | 0 | 0 | 0 | 0 | 51 | 7 |
| Career total | | | 209 | 40 | 37 | 13 | 0 | 0 | 2 | 0 | 248 | 53 |
