= Yevgeny Morozov (footballer) =

Russian footballer (born 2001)

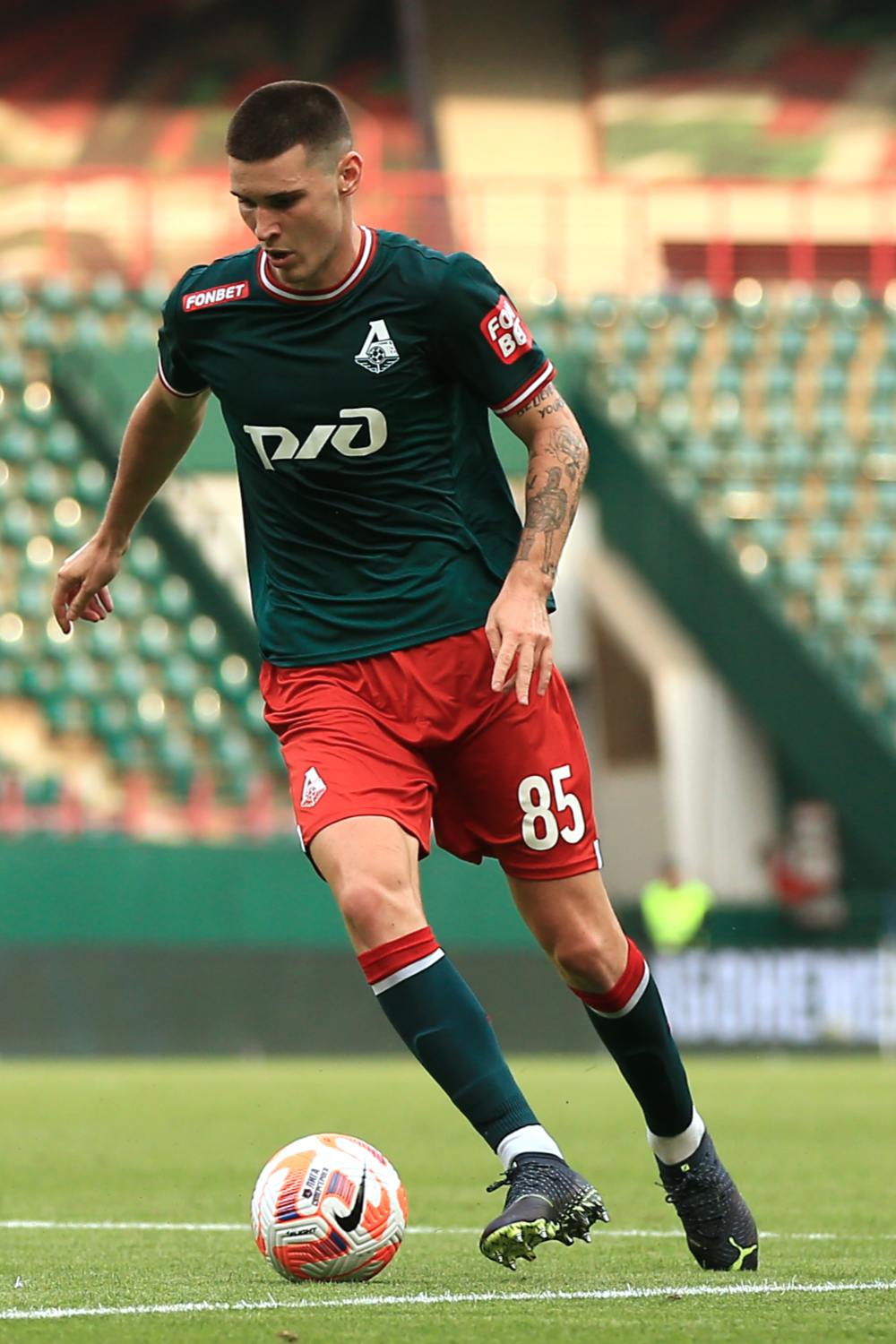

Personal information
- Full name: Yevgeny Vladimirovich Morozov
- Date of birth: 14 February 2001 (age 25)
- Place of birth: Moscow, Russia
- Height: 1.87 m (6 ft 2 in)
- Position: Centre-back

Team information
- Current team: Lokomotiv Moscow
- Number: 85

Youth career
- –2012: Orbita-Yunior Dzerzhinsky
- 2012: Trudovye Rezervy-Sportakademklub Moscow
- 2012–2019: Lokomotiv Moscow

Senior career*
| Years | Team | Apps | (Gls) |
| 2020–2022 | Kazanka Moscow | 21 | (4) |
| 2022– | Lokomotiv Moscow | 65 | (3) |
| 2022 | → Volgar Astrakhan (loan) | 10 | (2) |
| 2022–2023 | → Fakel (loan) | 25 | (2) |

International career^{‡}
| 2024– | Russia | 10 | (1) |
- * Club domestic league appearances and goals as of 22 November 2026 ‡ National team caps and goals as of 9 June 2026

Yevgeny Vladimirovich Morozov (Russian: Евгений Владимирович Морозов; born 14 February 2001) is a Russian football player who plays as a centre-back for Lokomotiv Moscow and the Russia national team.

== Club career ==
Morozov is a Lokomotiv Moscow academy graduate. From 2019, he played in the Youth Football League (MFL), scoring 6 goals in 34 matches, and for Lokomotiv's reserve team Kazanka Moscow, scoring 4 goals in 21 matches.

On 1 February 2022, Morozov joined Volgar Astrakhan on loan until the end of the season. He made his debut in the Russian Football National League on 6 March 2022 in a game against Yenisey Krasnoyarsk.

On 27 May 2022, Morozov joined Fakel Voronezh on loan for the 2022–23 season. He made his Russian Premier League debut for Fakel on 12 August 2022 against Ural Yekaterinburg and later become a strong first-team player. He scored his first goal for Fakel on 11 September 2022 in a 2–0 home win against Lokomotiv Moscow, the club to which he was contracted to at the time.

On 22 August 2023, Morozov extended his contract with Lokomotiv to June 2026. On 18 July 2025, the contract was extended to June 2029.

== International career ==
Morozov was first called up to the Russia national football team for a training camp in September 2023.

He made his debut on 21 March 2024 in a friendly against Serbia.

== Career statistics ==
=== Club ===
As of match played 22 November 2026

Appearances and goals by club, season and competition
| Club | Season | League | | | Cup | | Total | |
| Club | Season | Division | Apps | Goals | Apps | Goals | Apps | Goals |
|---|---|---|---|---|---|---|---|---|
| Kazanka Moscow | 2020–21 | Russian Second League | 4 | 0 | — | | 4 | 0 |
| Kazanka Moscow | 2021–22 | Russian Second League | 17 | 4 | — | | 17 | 4 |
| Kazanka Moscow | Total | | 21 | 4 | — | | 21 | 4 |
| Lokomotiv Moscow | 2022–23 | Russian Premier League | 0 | 0 | 0 | 0 | 0 | 0 |
| Lokomotiv Moscow | 2023–24 | Russian Premier League | 25 | 2 | 6 | 0 | 31 | 2 |
| Lokomotiv Moscow | 2024–25 | Russian Premier League | 10 | 1 | 2 | 0 | 12 | 1 |
| Lokomotiv Moscow | 2025–26 | Russian Premier League | 18 | 0 | 5 | 1 | 23 | 1 |
| Lokomotiv Moscow | 2026–27 | Russian Premier League | 12 | 0 | 3 | 0 | 15 | 0 |
| Lokomotiv Moscow | Total | | 65 | 3 | 16 | 1 | 81 | 4 |
| Volgar Astrakhan (loan) | 2021–22 | Russian First League | 10 | 2 | — | | 10 | 2 |
| Fakel Voronezh (loan) | 2022–23 | Russian Premier League | 25 | 2 | 3 | 0 | 28 | 2 |
| Career total | | | 121 | 11 | 19 | 1 | 140 | 12 |

=== International ===
As of match played 9 June 2026

Appearances and goals by national team and year
| National team | Year | Apps | Goals |
|---|---|---|---|
| Russia | 2024 | 5 | 1 |
| Russia | 2025 | 1 | 0 |
| Russia | 2026 | 4 | 0 |
| Total | | 10 | 1 |

=== International goals ===
| No. | Date | Venue | Opponent | Result | Score | Competition |
|---|---|---|---|---|---|---|
| 1. | 15 November 2024 | Krasnodar Stadium, Krasnodar, Russia | Brunei | 3–0 | 11–0 | Friendly |
