= Yegor Pogostnov =

Russian footballer (born 2004)

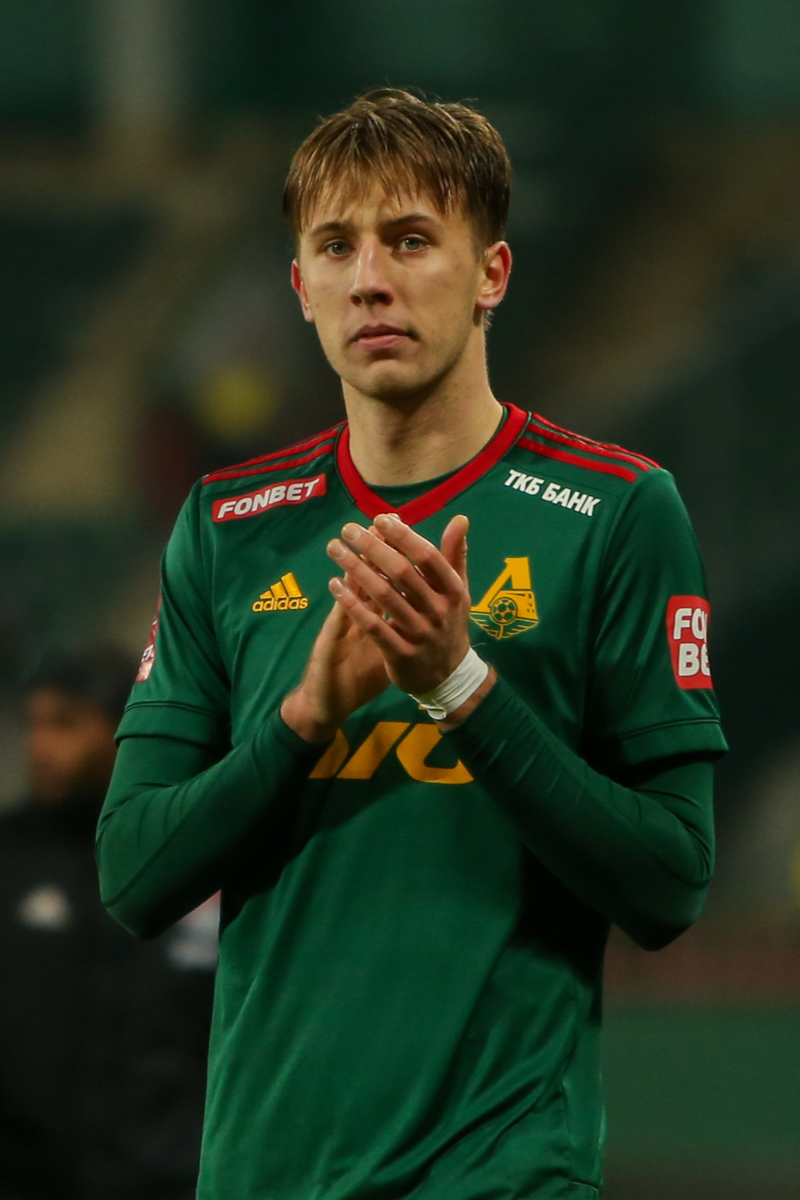

Personal information
- Full name: Yegor Alekseyevich Pogostnov
- Date of birth: 1 March 2004 (age 22)
- Place of birth: Alexandrov, Russia
- Height: 1.96 m (6 ft 5 in)
- Position: Centre-back

Team information
- Current team: Lokomotiv Moscow
- Number: 59

Youth career
- DYuSSh Faeton Alexandrov
- Lokomotiv Moscow

Senior career*
Years	Team	Apps	(Gls)
2022	Kazanka Moscow	1	(0)
2022–	Lokomotiv Moscow	29	(2)
2024	→ Arsenal Dzerzhinsk (loan)	13	(0)

International career^{‡}
2019–2020	Russia U16	3	(0)
2021	Russia U18	2	(0)
2021	Russia U19	1	(0)
2025	Russia U21	1	(0)
2023	Russia U23	1	(0)
- * Club domestic league appearances and goals as of 10 October 2026 ‡ National team caps and goals as of 22 March 2025

Yegor Alekseyevich Pogostnov (Russian: Егор Алексеевич Погостнов; born 1 March 2004) is a Russian footballer who plays as a centre-back for Lokomotiv Moscow.

== Club career ==
He made his debut in the Russian Premier League for Lokomotiv Moscow on 6 November 2022 in a game against Ural Yekaterinburg.

On 18 July 2025, Pogostnov extended his contract with Lokomotiv to June 2029.

== International career ==
Pogostnov was first called up to the Russia national football team for a training camp in September 2023.

== Career statistics ==
=== Club ===
As of match played 10 October 2026

Appearances and goals by club, season and competition
Club	Season	League			Cup		Total	
Club	Season	Division	Apps	Goals	Apps	Goals	Apps	Goals
Kazanka Moscow	2021–22	Russian Second League	1	0	—		1	0
Lokomotiv Moscow	2022–23	Russian Premier League	9	0	1	0	10	0
Lokomotiv Moscow	2023–24	Russian Premier League	4	1	1	0	5	1
Lokomotiv Moscow	2024–25	Russian Premier League	7	0	6	2	13	2
Lokomotiv Moscow	2025–26	Russian Premier League	6	0	5	0	11	0
Lokomotiv Moscow	2026–27	Russian Premier League	3	1	0	0	3	1
Lokomotiv Moscow	Total		29	2	13	2	42	4
Arsenal Dzerzhinsk (loan)	2024	Belarusian Premier League	13	0	0	0	13	0
Career total			43	2	13	2	56	4
