= Dmitry Radikovsky =

Russian footballer (born

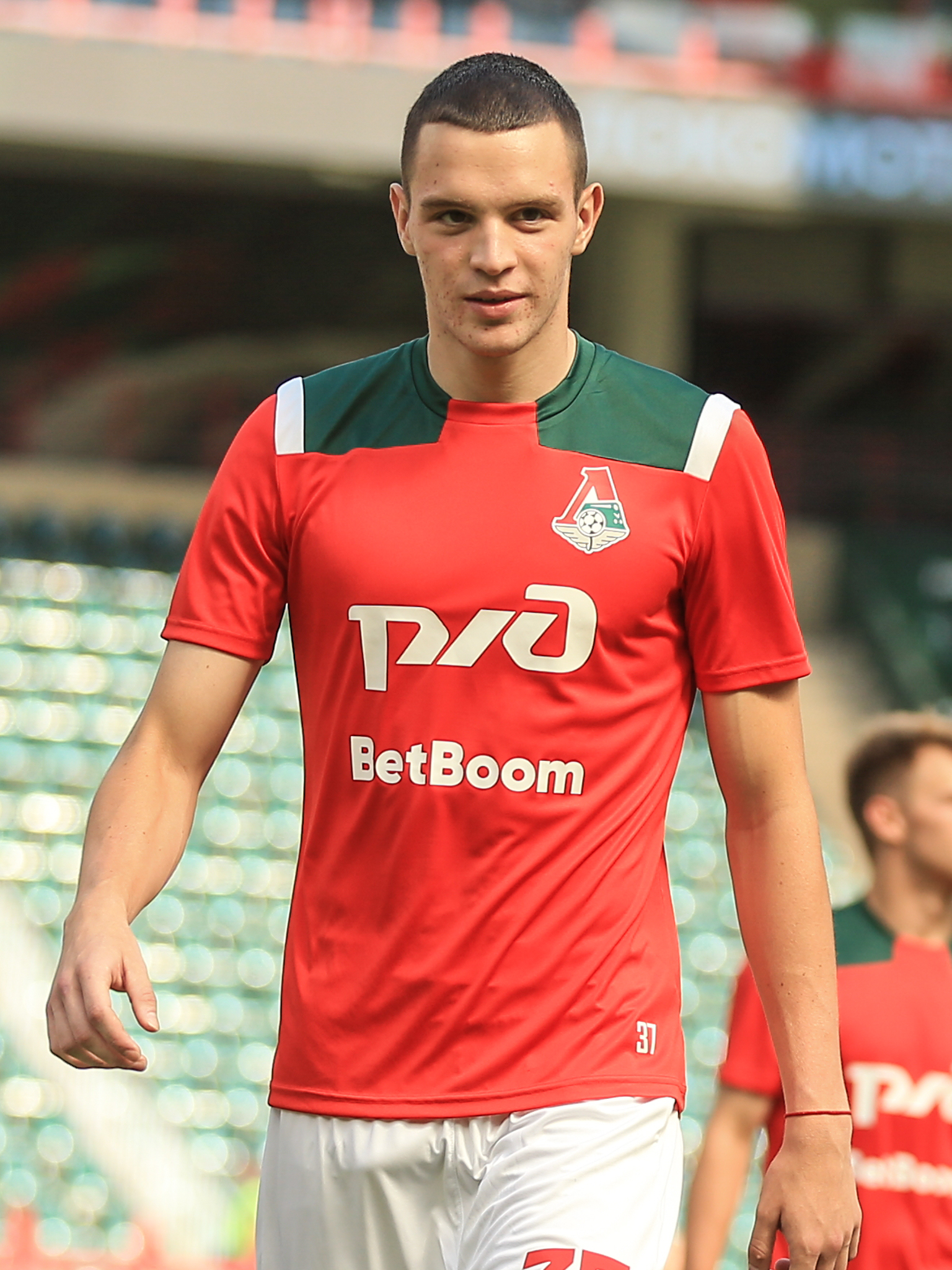
- Radikovsky with Lokomotiv in 2024

Personal information
- Full name: Dmitry Vladimirovich Radikovsky
- Date of birth: 4 June 2005 (age 21)
- Height: 1.93 m (6 ft 4 in)
- Position: Centre-forward

Team information
- Current team: Neman Grodno (on loan from Lokomotiv Moscow)
- Number: 37

Youth career
- –2022: Konoplyov football academy
- 2022–2024: Lokomotiv Moscow

Senior career*
Years	Team	Apps	(Gls)
2024–	Lokomotiv Moscow	0	(0)
2024	→ Arsenal Dzerzhinsk (loan)	14	(5)
2025	→ Vitebsk (loan)	23	(6)
2026–	→ Neman Grodno (loan)	12	(1)

International career^{‡}
2024–	Russia U21	1	(0)
- * Club domestic league appearances and goals as of 3 July 2026 ‡ National team caps and goals as of 6 September 2024

Dmitry Vladimirovich Radikovsky (Russian: Дмитрий Владимирович Радиковский; born 4 June 2005) is a Russian football player who plays as a centre-forward for Neman Grodno on loan from Lokomotiv Moscow.

== Career ==
Radikovsky made his debut for Lokomotiv Moscow on 28 August 2024 in a Russian Cup game against Khimki and scored the last goal in a 4–0 victory.

== Career statistics ==
As of match played 3 December 2025

Appearances and goals by club, season and competition
Club	Season	League			Cup		Total	
Club	Season	Division	Apps	Goals	Apps	Goals	Apps	Goals
Lokomotiv Moscow	2023–24	Russian Premier League	0	0	0	0	0	0
Lokomotiv Moscow	2024–25	Russian Premier League	0	0	2	1	2	1
Lokomotiv Moscow	2025–26	Russian Premier League	0	0	0	0	0	0
Lokomotiv Moscow	Total		0	0	2	1	2	1
Arsenal Dzerzhinsk (loan)	2024	Belarusian Premier League	14	5	0	0	14	5
Vitebsk (loan)	2025	Belarusian Premier League	23	6	5	0	28	6
Career total			37	11	7	1	44	12
