= Lucas Fasson =

Brazilian footballer

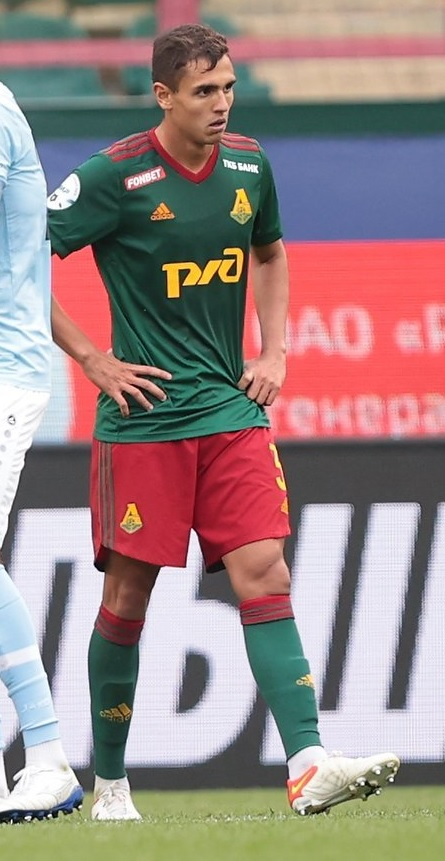
- Fasson with Lokomotiv Moscow in 2022

Personal information
- Full name: Lucas Fasson dos Santos
- Date of birth: 30 May 2001 (age 25)
- Place of birth: Santo André, Brazil
- Height: 1.87 m (6 ft 2 in)
- Position: Defender

Team information
- Current team: Lokomotiv Moscow
- Number: 3

Youth career
- 2010–2012: Diadema
- 2012–2020: São Paulo

Senior career*
Years	Team	Apps	(Gls)
2020	São Paulo	1	(0)
2020–2021	Deportes La Serena	31	(0)
2021–2022	Athletico Paranaense	17	(0)
2022–	Lokomotiv Moscow	72	(3)

International career^{‡}
2020	Brazil U20	1	(0)
2024	Brazil U23	5	(0)
- * Club domestic league appearances and goals as of 22 November 2026 ‡ National team caps and goals as of 11 February 2024

Lucas Fasson dos Santos (born 30 May 2001) is a Brazilian professional footballer who plays as a defender for Russian club Lokomotiv Moscow.

== Club career ==
In 2020, Spanish La Liga side Barcelona offered to sign Fasson from São Paulo but the transfer never happened due to Barcelona opting not to pay his 40 million euro release clause.

For the 2020 season, he signed for Deportes La Serena in the Chilean top flight.

On 8 June 2022, Fasson signed a four-year contract with Russian Premier League club Lokomotiv Moscow. On 17 June 2026, Fasson extended his Lokomotiv contract for four more seasons.

== International career ==
Fasson represented Brazil U23 at the 2024 CONMEBOL Pre-Olympic Tournament, where Brazil failed to qualify for the Olympics.

== Career statistics ==
As of match played 22 November 2026

Appearances and goals by club, season and competition
Club	Season	League			Cup		Continental		Other		Total	
Club	Season	Division	Apps	Goals	Apps	Goals	Apps	Goals	Apps	Goals	Apps	Goals
São Paulo	2019	Série A	0	0	—		0	0	—		0	0
São Paulo	2020	Série A	0	0	0	0	0	0	1 (Note: Appearance in the Campeonato Paulista)	0	1	0
São Paulo	Total		0	0	0	0	0	0	1	0	1	0
Deportes La Serena	2020	Chilean Primera División	20	0	0	0	—		—		20	0
Deportes La Serena	2021	Chilean Primera División	11	0	4	0	—		—		15	0
Deportes La Serena	Total		31	0	4	0	0	0	0	0	35	0
Athletico Paranaense	2021	Série A	8	0	2	0	1 (Note: Appearance in the Copa Sudamericana)	0	—		11	0
Athletico Paranaense	2022	Série A	1	0	1	0	0	0	8 (Note: Appearances in the Campeonato Paranaense)	0	10	0
Athletico Paranaense	Total		9	0	3	0	1	0	8	0	21	0
Lokomotiv Moscow	2022–23	Russian Premier League	3	0	0	0	—		—		3	0
Lokomotiv Moscow	2023–24	Russian Premier League	21	1	7	0	—		—		28	1
Lokomotiv Moscow	2024–25	Russian Premier League	11	0	2	0	—		—		13	0
Lokomotiv Moscow	2025–26	Russian Premier League	26	2	8	0	—		—		34	2
Lokomotiv Moscow	2026–27	Russian Premier League	11	0	3	0	—		—		14	0
Lokomotiv Moscow	Total		72	3	20	0	—		—		92	3
Career total			112	3	27	0	1	0	9	0	149	3

== Honours ==
São Paulo

- Copa São Paulo de Futebol Jr.: 2019

Athletico Paranaense

- Copa Sudamericana: 2021
