= Artyom Karpukas =

Russian footballer (born 2002)

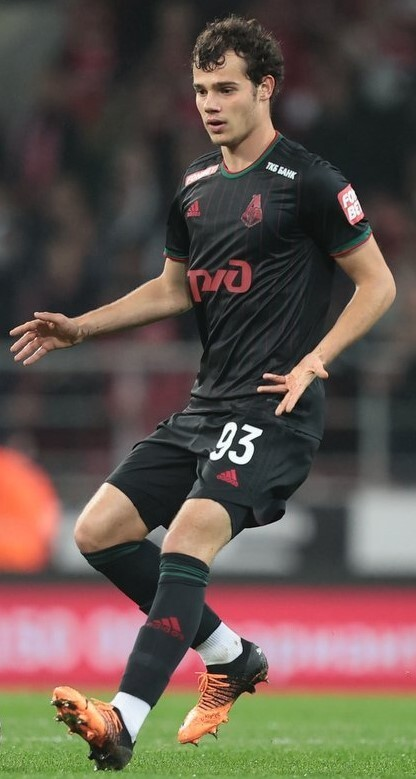
- Karpukas with Lokomotiv Moscow in 2022

Personal information
- Full name: Artyom Mikhaylovich Karpukas
- Date of birth: 13 June 2002 (age 24)
- Place of birth: Biysk, Russia
- Height: 1.84 m (6 ft 0 in)
- Position: Midfielder

Team information
- Current team: Zenit Saint Petersburg
- Number: 93

Youth career
- 2007–2009: Altay Sport School
- 2009–2013: Alexey Smertin Academy
- 2013–2020: Lokomotiv Moscow

Senior career*
Years	Team	Apps	(Gls)
2021	Kazanka Moscow	8	(0)
2022–2026	Lokomotiv Moscow	112	(5)
2026–	Zenit Saint Petersburg	11	(1)

International career^{‡}
2022	Russia U21	2	(0)
2023–	Russia	6	(0)
- * Club domestic league appearances and goals as of 21 November 2026 ‡ National team caps and goals as of 3 October 2026

Artyom Mikhaylovich Karpukas (Russian: Артём Михайлович Карпукас; born 13 June 2002) is a Russian football player who plays for Zenit Saint Petersburg and the Russia national team.

== Club career ==
Karpukas made his debut in the Russian Premier League for Lokomotiv Moscow on 17 April 2022 in a game against Sochi.

On 22 August 2023, Karpukas extended his contract with Lokomotiv to June 2027.

On 21 August 2026, Karpukas joined Russian champions Zenit Saint Petersburg with a contract until June 2031.

== International career ==
Karpukas was called up to the Russia national football team for the first time in November 2022 for friendly games against Tajikistan and Uzbekistan. He made his debut on 12 September 2023 in a friendly against Qatar.

== Career statistics ==
=== Club ===
As of match played 21 November 2026

Appearances and goals by club, season and competition
Club	Season	League			Cup		Europe		Total	
Club	Season	Division	Apps	Goals	Apps	Goals	Apps	Goals	Apps	Goals
Kazanka Moscow	2021–22	Russian Second League	8	0	—		—		8	0
Lokomotiv Moscow	2021–22	Russian Premier League	6	0	0	0	0	0	6	0
Lokomotiv Moscow	2022–23	Russian Premier League	27	2	5	0	—		32	2
Lokomotiv Moscow	2023–24	Russian Premier League	23	1	7	0	—		30	1
Lokomotiv Moscow	2024–25	Russian Premier League	25	1	9	0	—		34	1
Lokomotiv Moscow	2025–26	Russian Premier League	28	1	7	1	—		35	2
Lokomotiv Moscow	2026–27	Russian Premier League	3	0	1	0	—		4	0
Lokomotiv Moscow	Total		112	5	29	1	0	0	141	6
Zenit St. Petersburg	2026–27	Russian Premier League	11	1	3	0	—		14	1
Career total			131	6	32	1	0	0	163	7

=== International ===
As of match played 3 October 2026

Appearances and goals by national team and year
National team	Year	Apps	Goals
Russia
Russia	2024	4	0
Russia	2026	2	0
Total		6	0
