= Vladislav Sarveli =

Russian footballer

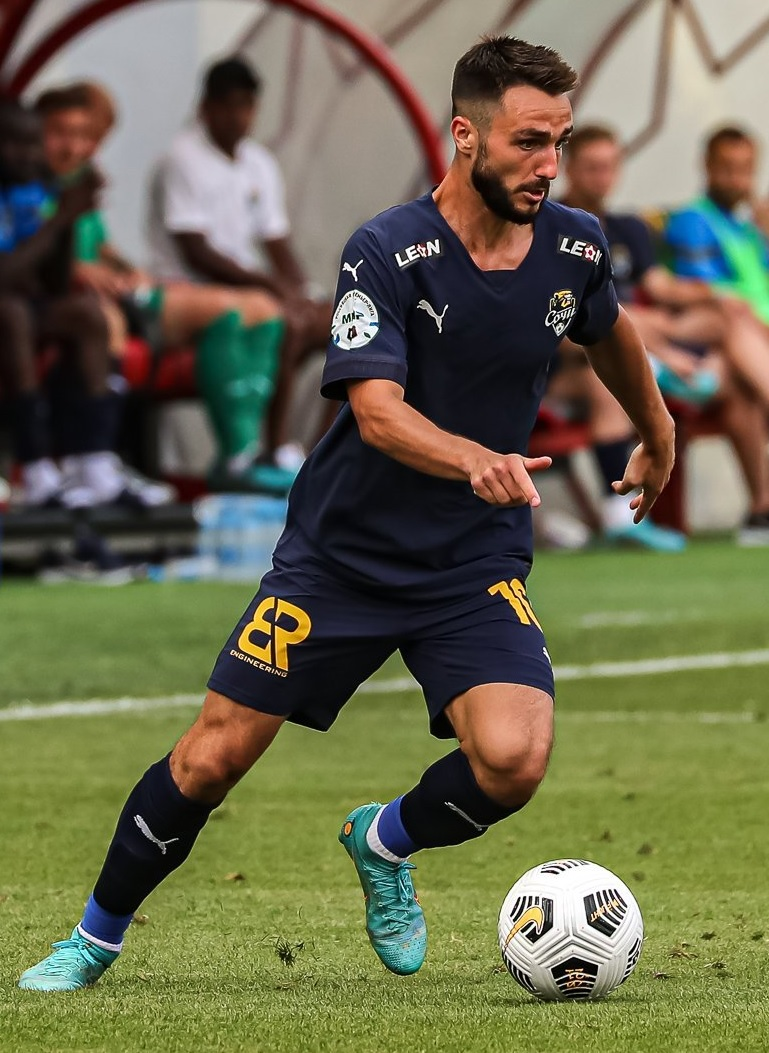
- Sarveli with Sochi in 2022

Personal information
- Full name: Vladislav Konstantinovich Sarveli
- Date of birth: 1 October 1997 (age 29)
- Place of birth: Bolshoy Kamen, Russia
- Height: 1.76 m (5 ft 9 in)
- Position: Forward

Team information
- Current team: Nizhny Novgorod
- Number: 9

Youth career
- –2012: Okean Nakhodka
- 2014–2015: Chertanovo Education Center

Senior career*
Years	Team	Apps	(Gls)
2014–2020	Chertanovo Moscow	137	(40)
2020–2022	Krylia Sovetov Samara	54	(14)
2022–2023	Sochi	26	(4)
2023–2026	Lokomotiv Moscow	45	(3)
2026–	Nizhny Novgorod	0	(0)
- * Club domestic league appearances and goals as of 17 May 2026

Vladislav Konstantinovich Sarveli (Russian: Владислав Константинович Сарвели; born 1 October 1997) is a Russian football player who plays as centre forward or second striker for Nizhny Novgorod.

== Club career ==
He made his professional debut in the Russian Professional Football League for Chertanovo Moscow on 25 July 2014 in a game against Tambov. He made his Russian Football National League debut for Chertanovo on 17 July 2018 in a game against Rotor Volgograd.

On 21 May 2021, he scored the only goal by Krylia Sovetov Samara in a 2021 Russian Cup Final, which Krylia Sovetov eventually lost to Lokomotiv Moscow with a score of 1–3.

He made his Russian Premier League debut for Krylia Sovetov Samara on 25 July 2021 in a game against Akhmat Grozny and scored his team's goal in a 1–2 loss.

On 24 June 2022, Sarveli signed with Sochi.

On 29 June 2023, Sarveli moved to Lokomotiv Moscow on a three-year contract. He left Lokomotiv in June 2026.

On 2 July 2026, Sarveli signed a two-year contract with Nizhny Novgorod.

== International career ==
Sarveli was called up to the Russia national football team for the first time for a training camp in March 2022, at the time of Russia's suspension from international football.

== Personal life ==
The origins of his last name are uncertain, his father believed that his family has Italian ancestry and his grandmother thought the name is of Georgian origin. Vladislav considers himself Russian.

== Career statistics ==
As of match played 17 May 2026

Appearances and goals by club, season and competition
Club	Season	League			Cup		Other		Total	
Club	Season	Division	Apps	Goals	Apps	Goals	Apps	Goals	Apps	Goals
Chertanovo Moscow	2014–15	Russian Second League	14	1	—		—		14	1
Chertanovo Moscow	2015–16	Russian Second League	18	6	2	1	2 (Note: Appearances in the FNL Cup)	0	22	7
Chertanovo Moscow	2016–17	Russian Second League	18	3	2	0	5	2	25	5
Chertanovo Moscow	2017–18	Russian Second League	25	8	3	0	5	0	33	8
Chertanovo Moscow	2018–19	Russian First League	37	12	1	0	5	0	43	12
Chertanovo Moscow	2019–20	Russian First League	25	10	0	0	4	0	29	10
Chertanovo Moscow	Total		137	40	8	1	21	2	166	43
Krylia Sovetov Samara	2020–21	Russian First League	25	5	6	2	—		31	7
Krylia Sovetov Samara	2021–22	Russian Premier League	29	9	1	0	—		30	9
Krylia Sovetov Samara	Total		54	14	7	2	0	0	61	16
Sochi	2022–23	Russian Premier League	26	4	6	1	—		32	5
Lokomotiv Moscow	2023–24	Russian Premier League	15	1	5	2	—		20	3
Lokomotiv Moscow	2024–25	Russian Premier League	23	2	10	1	—		33	3
Lokomotiv Moscow	2025–26	Russian Premier League	7	0	5	1	—		12	1
Lokomotiv Moscow	Total		45	3	20	4	—		65	7
Career total			262	61	41	8	21	2	324	71
