= Maksim Nenakhov =

Russian footballer (born 1998)

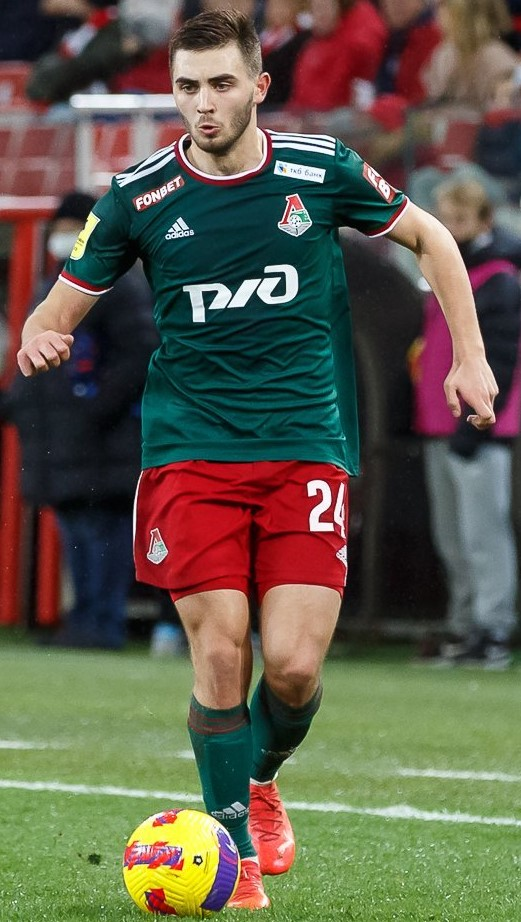
- Nenakhov with Lokomotiv Moscow in 2021

Personal information
- Full name: Maksim Maksimovich Nenakhov
- Date of birth: 13 December 1998 (age 27)
- Place of birth: Krasnogorsk, Russia
- Height: 1.79 m (5 ft 10 in)
- Position: Right-back

Team information
- Current team: FC Lokomotiv Moscow
- Number: 24

Youth career
- –2009: FC Zorky Krasnogorsk
- 2009–2018: FC Dynamo Moscow

Senior career*
Years	Team	Apps	(Gls)
2016–2017	FC Dynamo-2 Moscow	19	(1)
2018–2019	FC Dynamo Moscow	0	(0)
2018	→ FC Tyumen (loan)	13	(0)
2018–2019	→ FC SKA-Khabarovsk (loan)	25	(1)
2019–2020	FC Rotor Volgograd	24	(2)
2020–2021	FC Akhmat Grozny	36	(0)
2021–	FC Lokomotiv Moscow	118	(1)

International career^{‡}
2018	Russia U-20	1	(0)
2020	Russia U-21	2	(0)
- * Club domestic league appearances and goals as of 1 November 2026 ‡ National team caps and goals as of 17 November 2020

Maksim Maksimovich Nenakhov (Russian: Максим Максимович Ненахов; born 13 December 1998) is a Russian football player who plays as a right back for FC Lokomotiv Moscow.

== Club career ==
He made his debut in the Russian Professional Football League for FC Dynamo-2 Moscow on 20 July 2016 in a game against FC Tekstilshchik Ivanovo.

On 19 January 2018, he was loaned to FC Tyumen until the end of the 2017–18 season. He made his Russian Football National League debut for Tyumen on 4 March 2018 in a game against FC Olimpiyets Nizhny Novgorod. On 14 June 2018, he moved on another loan for the 2018–19 season to FC SKA-Khabarovsk.

On 18 June 2019, he signed a 2-year contract with FC Rotor Volgograd.

On 15 January 2020, Rotor announces his transfer to Russian Premier League club FC Akhmat Grozny.

On 3 June 2021, he signed a 3-year contract with FC Lokomotiv Moscow. On 14 January 2024, Nenakhov extended his contract to June 2028.

== Career statistics ==
As of match played 1 November 2026

Club	Season	League			Cup		Europe		Other		Total	
Club	Season	Division	Apps	Goals	Apps	Goals	Apps	Goals	Apps	Goals	Apps	Goals
Dynamo-2 Moscow	2016–17	Russian Second League	19	1	—		—		—		19	1
Tyumen	2017–18	Russian First League	13	0	—		—		4 (Note: Appearances in the FNL Cup)	0	17	0
SKA-Khabarovsk	2018–19	Russian First League	25	1	2	0	—		—		27	1
Rotor Volgograd	2019–20	Russian First League	24	2	1	0	—		—		25	2
Akhmat Grozny	2019–20	Russian Premier League	9	0	1	0	—		—		10	0
Akhmat Grozny	2020–21	Russian Premier League	27	0	4	0	—		—		31	0
Akhmat Grozny	Total		36	0	5	0	0	0	0	0	41	0
Lokomotiv Moscow	2021–22	Russian Premier League	13	0	1	0	3 (Note: Appearances in the UEFA Europa League)	0	0	0	17	0
Lokomotiv Moscow	2022–23	Russian Premier League	20	1	6	0	—		—		26	1
Lokomotiv Moscow	2023–24	Russian Premier League	26	0	5	0	—		—		31	0
Lokomotiv Moscow	2024–25	Russian Premier League	28	0	10	1	—		—		38	1
Lokomotiv Moscow	2025–26	Russian Premier League	21	0	7	0	—		—		28	0
Lokomotiv Moscow	2026–27	Russian Premier League	10	0	4	0	—		—		14	0
Lokomotiv Moscow	Total		118	1	33	1	3	0	0	0	154	2
Career total			235	5	41	1	3	0	4	0	283	6
