= Ilya Samoshnikov =

Russian footballer (born 1997)

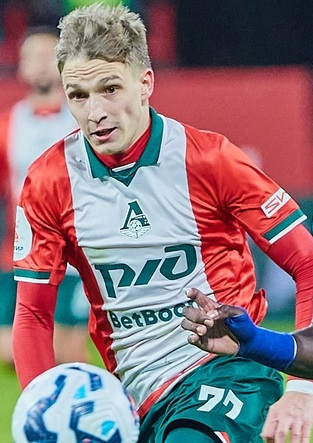
- Samoshnikov with Lokomotiv Moscow in 2025

Personal information
- Full name: Ilya Andreyevich Samoshnikov
- Date of birth: 14 November 1997 (age 29)
- Place of birth: Reutov, Moscow Oblast, Russia
- Height: 1.77 m (5 ft 10 in)
- Position: Right winger

Team information
- Current team: Rubin Kazan (on loan from Spartak Moscow)
- Number: 71

Youth career
- 2005–2014: Prialit Reutov

Senior career*
Years	Team	Apps	(Gls)
2015–2016	Prialit Reutov (amateur)		
2017	Veles Moscow (amateur)		
2017–2018	Ararat Moscow	19	(1)
2018	Shinnik Yaroslavl	14	(0)
2019	Torpedo Moscow	22	(1)
2020–2023	Rubin Kazan	82	(5)
2023–2025	Lokomotiv Moscow	53	(5)
2025–	Spartak Moscow	2	(0)
2026–	→ Rubin Kazan (loan)	12	(0)

International career^{‡}
2021–	Russia	5	(1)
- * Club domestic league appearances and goals as of 21 November 2026 ‡ National team caps and goals as of 7 September 2025

Ilya Andreyevich Samoshnikov (Russian: Илья Андреевич Самошников; born 14 November 1997) is a Russian football player who plays as a right winger for Rubin Kazan on loan from Spartak Moscow, and the Russia national team.

== Club career ==
Samoshnikov began his football career in the amateur league in Moscow.

He made his debut in the Russian Professional Football League for FC Ararat Moscow on 19 July 2017 in a game against FC Zorky Krasnogorsk.

He made his Russian Football National League debut for FC Shinnik Yaroslavl on 26 August 2018 in a game against FC Baltika Kaliningrad.

On 2 January 2020, he signed with Russian Premier League club FC Rubin Kazan. He made his RPL debut for Rubin on 27 June 2020 in a game against FC Lokomotiv Moscow, as a starter.

On 17 June 2023, Samoshnikov signed a three-year contract with Lokomotiv Moscow.

On 19 August 2025, Samoshnikov moved to Spartak Moscow and signed a three-season deal.

On 8 July 2026, Samoshnikov returned to Rubin Kazan on a season-long loan.

== International career ==
He was called up to the Russia national football team for the first time in March 2021 for the World Cup qualifiers against Malta, Slovenia and Slovakia.

On 11 May 2021, he was included in the preliminary extended 30-man squad for UEFA Euro 2020. He was not included in the final squad.

He made his debut for the senior squad on 1 September 2021 in a World cup qualifier against Croatia. He substituted Mário Fernandes in the 78th minute, as the game ended in a 0–0 draw. He made his first appearance in the starting line-up 3 days later in the next qualifier against Cyprus.

== Career statistics ==
=== Club ===
As of match played 21 November 2026

Appearances and goals by club, season and competition
Club	Season	League			Cup		Europe		Other		Total	
Club	Season	Division	Apps	Goals	Apps	Goals	Apps	Goals	Apps	Goals	Apps	Goals
Prialit Reutov	2015	Russian Amateur Football League	—									
Prialit Reutov	2016	Russian Amateur Football League	—									
Veles-M Moscow	2017	Russian Amateur Football League	—									
Ararat Moscow	2017–18	Russian Professional Football League	19	1	4	0	—		4 (Note: Appearances in the FNL Cup)	0	27	1
Shinnik Yaroslavl	2018–19	Russian Football National League	14	0	1	0	—		—		15	0
Torpedo Moscow	2019–20	Russian Football National League	22	1	2	0	—		—		24	1
Rubin Kazan	2019–20	Russian Premier League	6	0	—		—		—		6	0
Rubin Kazan	2020–21	Russian Premier League	24	2	2	0	—		—		26	2
Rubin Kazan	2021–22	Russian Premier League	24	1	2	0	1 (Note: Appearance in the UEFA Europa Conference League)	0	—		27	1
Rubin Kazan	2022–23	Russian First League	28	2	0	0	—		—		28	2
Rubin Kazan	Total		82	5	4	0	1	0	0	0	87	5
Lokomotiv Moscow	2023–24	Russian Premier League	28	1	7	0	—		—		35	1
Lokomotiv Moscow	2024–25	Russian Premier League	24	4	9	0	—		—		33	4
Lokomotiv Moscow	2025–26	Russian Premier League	1	0	1	0	—		—		2	0
Lokomotiv Moscow	Total		53	5	17	0	—		—		70	5
Spartak Moscow	2025–26	Russian Premier League	2	0	3	1	—		—		5	1
Rubin Kazan (loan)	2026–27	Russian Premier League	12	0	4	0	—		—		16	0
Rubin Kazan (loan)	Club total		94	5	8	0	1	0	0	0	103	5
Career total			204	12	35	1	1	0	4	0	244	13

=== International ===
As of match played 7 September 2025

Appearances and goals by national team and year
National team	Year	Apps	Goals
Russia	2021	3	0
Russia	2024	1	1
Russia	2025	1	0
Total		5	1

==== International goals ====
Scores and results list Russia's goal tally first.

No.	Date	Venue	Opponent	Score	Result	Competition
1	19 November 2024	Volgograd Arena, Volgograd, Russia	Syria	2–0	4–0	Friendly

== Honours ==
Spartak Moscow

- Russian Cup: 2025–26
