= Aleksey Batrakov =

Russian footballer (born 2005)

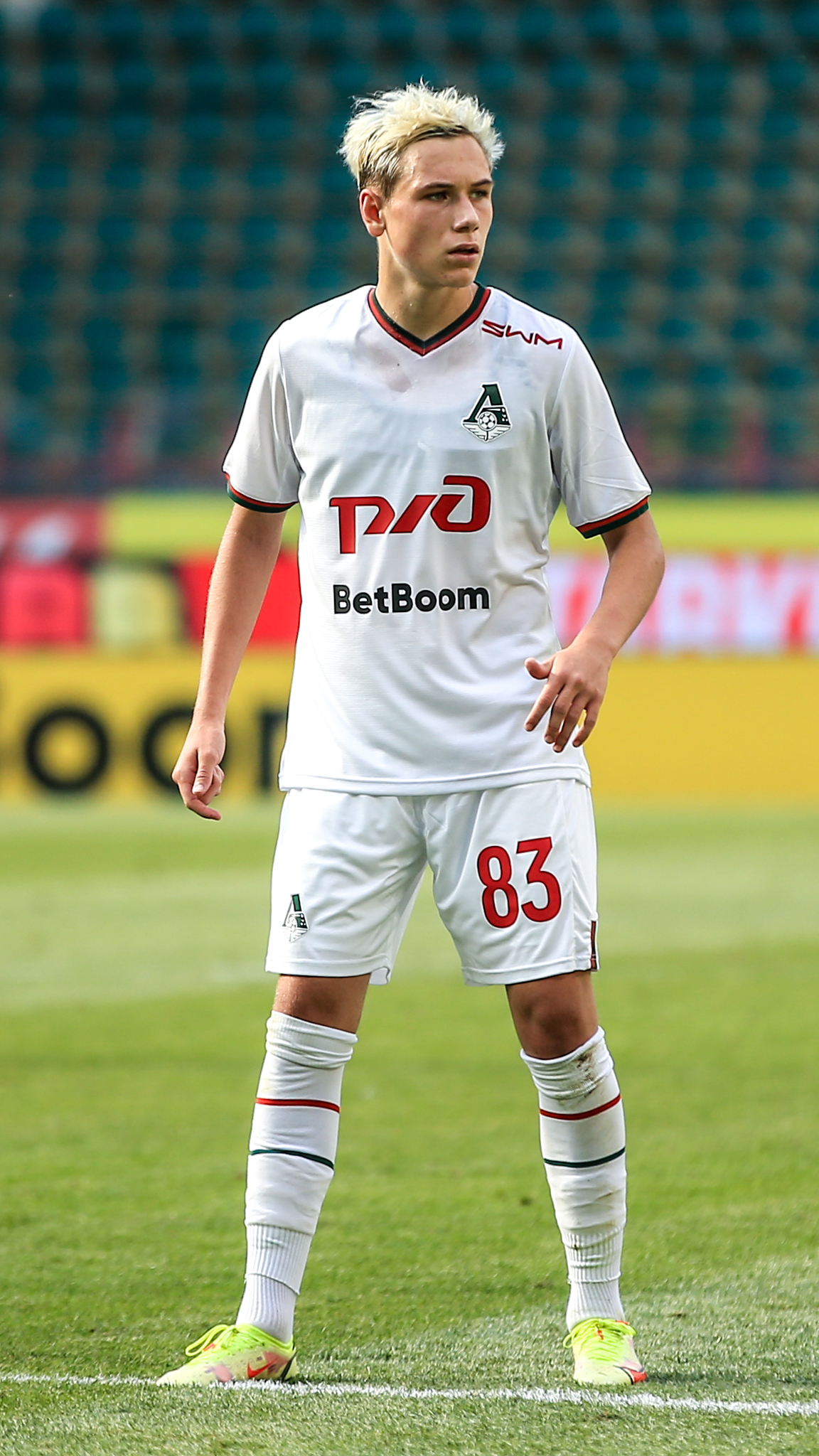
- Batrakov with Lokomotiv Moscow in 2024

Personal information
- Full name: Aleksey Andreevich Batrakov
- Date of birth: 9 June 2005 (age 21)
- Place of birth: Orekhovo-Zuyevo, Russia
- Height: 1.73 m (5 ft 8 in)
- Position: Attacking midfielder

Team information
- Current team: Galatasaray
- Number: 83

Youth career
- 2011–2024: Lokomotiv Moscow

Senior career*
Years	Team	Apps	(Gls)
2024–2026	Lokomotiv Moscow	66	(29)
2026–	Galatasaray	9	(2)

International career^{‡}
2019	Russia U-15	2	(0)
2023	Russia U-19	1	(0)
2024–	Russia	17	(4)
- * Club domestic league appearances and goals as of 7 November 2026 ‡ National team caps and goals as of 17 November 2026

Aleksey Andreevich Batrakov (Russian: Алексей Андреевич Батраков; born 9 June 2005) is a Russian professional footballer who plays as an attacking midfielder for Süper Lig club Galatasaray and the Russia national team.

== Early life ==
Born in 2005 in Orekhovo-Zuyevo, near Moscow, Batrakov was drawn to football from an early age, playing in his neighborhood. His parents enrolled him in futsal, and by 2011, at just 6 years old, he joined FC Lokomotiv's Academy, progressing through every age group.

== Club career ==
=== Lokomotiv Moscow ===
A graduate of FC Lokomotiv Moscow's Academy, he stood out in various youth tournaments as part of the FC Lokomotiv Moscow's squad. During the 2020/21 season, he won the Youth Football League 2 (YFL-2) with the team, and in the 2023 season, triumphed in the Russian Youth Football League. His exceptional performances earned him the tournament's Best Player award, as well as the title of Top Playmaker for the season. Impressively, he tied for first in the "goal plus assist" category, recording 9 goals and 12 assists in 17 matches.

In the summer of 2023, he began training with FC Lokomotiv's senior team and participated in friendlies, scoring against FC Volgar Astrakhan. On 29 December 2023, Batrakov signed a new contract with Lokomotiv Moscow until 2027. He was invited to training camp in the UAE. In a match against Saudi side Al-Okhdood, he came on as a substitute, delivering an assist and scoring a goal. He also found the net in a match against Gulf United.

Batrakov made his debut in the Russian Premier League for Lokomotiv Moscow on 31 March 2024 in a game against Krasnodar. He scored his first RPL goal for Lokomotiv in his third game on 12 May 2024 against Orenburg.

In the 2024–25 season, Batrakov scored 7 goals in the first 9 games, tying Maksim Glushenkov (who left Lokomotiv for Russian champions Zenit before the season, opening playing time for Batrakov) for the top of the goal scorers table at the time, also providing 5 assists in those 9 games. He took the lead in the goalscoring race with 10 goals after half of the games have been played in the league season. He finished the league season as third-best goal scorer with 14 goals. On 9 June 2025, Batrakov extended his contract with Lokomotiv to 2029.

Batrakov started the 2025–26 season with 6 goals in the first 4 league games, including his first career hat-trick in a 4–2 victory over Spartak Moscow, as Lokomotiv took the top spot in the table. He concluded the 2025–26 campaign with 17 goals and 13 assists in all competitions.

Ahead of the 2026–27 season, he switched numbers from his original 83 to a 10, which had previously been worn by Dmitry Loskov, the club's legendary playmaker of the 1990s and 2000s.

=== Galatasaray ===
On 20 August 2026, Süper Lig club Galatasaray announced that it had initiated official negotiations with Batrakov and his club, Lokomotiv Moscow, regarding his transfer. Batrakov arrived in Istanbul on the same day. Batrakov became the first Russian footballer in Galatasaray's 121-year history. Also that day, a 5-year contract was signed with Galatasaray; a transfer fee of €25,000,000.00 will be paid for his transfer.

Batrakov made his Süper Lig debut on 29 August 2026, coming on as a substitute in a 3–2 home victory against Göztepe. He registered his first assist for the club on 9 October 2026 during a 3–1 league win over Kasımpaşa. Batrakov made his UEFA Champions League debut on 9 September 2026, starting in a 3–1 league phase defeat away against Sporting. Despite Galatasaray's 1–4 home defeat to Barcelona on 13 October 2026, Batrakov scored Galatasaray's only goal of the match, marking his first career goal in European competition. On 21 October 2026, he delivered a standout European performance in an away fixture against Lille. Batrakov contributed both a goal and an assist to lead Galatasaray to a 4–2 victory, securing their first wins of the Champions League campaign.

== International career ==
On 8 September 2023, he made his debut for Russia's under-21 national team, coached by Ivan Shabarov, who had previously called him up to the U-19 squad. In the match against Uzbekistan, which ended in a 3–3 draw, he played a key role, contributing to two of the team's three goals.

Batrakov was first called up to the Russia national team for 2024 LPBank Cup in September 2024. He made his debut on 15 November 2024 in a friendly against Brunei, and scored on his debut. On his 21st birthday, he scored a goal in a friendly against Trinidad and Tobago, confirming a 3–0 win.

== Career statistics ==
=== Club ===
As of match played 7 November 2026

Appearances and goals by club, season and competition
Club	Season	League			National cup (Note: Includes Russian Cup, Turkish Cup)		Europe		Other		Total	
Club	Season	Division	Apps	Goals	Apps	Goals	Apps	Goals	Apps	Goals	Apps	Goals
Lokomotiv Moscow	2023–24	Russian Premier League	5	1	1	0	—		—		6	1
Lokomotiv Moscow	2024–25	Russian Premier League	29	14	8	1	—		—		37	15
Lokomotiv Moscow	2025–26	Russian Premier League	28	13	8	4	—		—		36	17
Lokomotiv Moscow	2026–27	Russian Premier League	4	1	1	0	—		—		5	1
Lokomotiv Moscow	Total		66	29	18	5	—		—		84	34
Galatasaray	2026–27	Süper Lig	9	2	0	0	4 (Note: Appearances in UEFA Champions League)	4	0	0	13	6
Career total			75	31	18	5	4	4	0	0	97	40

=== International ===
As of match played 17 November 2026

Appearances and goals by national team and year
National team	Year	Apps	Goals
Russia	2024	2	1
Russia	2025	8	2
Russia	2026	7	1
Total		17	4

No.	Date	Venue	Opponent	Score	Result	Competition
1.	15 November 2024	Krasnodar Stadium, Krasnodar, Russia	Brunei	10–0	11–0	Friendly
2.	25 March 2025	VTB Arena, Moscow, Russia	Zambia	5–0	5–0	Friendly
3.	10 October 2025	Volgograd Arena, Volgograd, Russia	Iran	2–1	2–1	Friendly
4.	9 June 2026	Kaliningrad Stadium, Kaliningrad, Russia	Trinidad and Tobago	3–0	3–0	Friendly

== Honours ==
Lokomotiv Moscow U19

- Russian Youth Championship: 2023

Individual

- Russian Premier League Player of the Month: September 2024, July/August 2025
- Russian Premier League Young Player of the Season: 2024–25, 2025–26
- Russian Premier League Team of the Season: 2024–25, 2025–26
