= Vadim Rakov =

Russian footballer (born 2005)

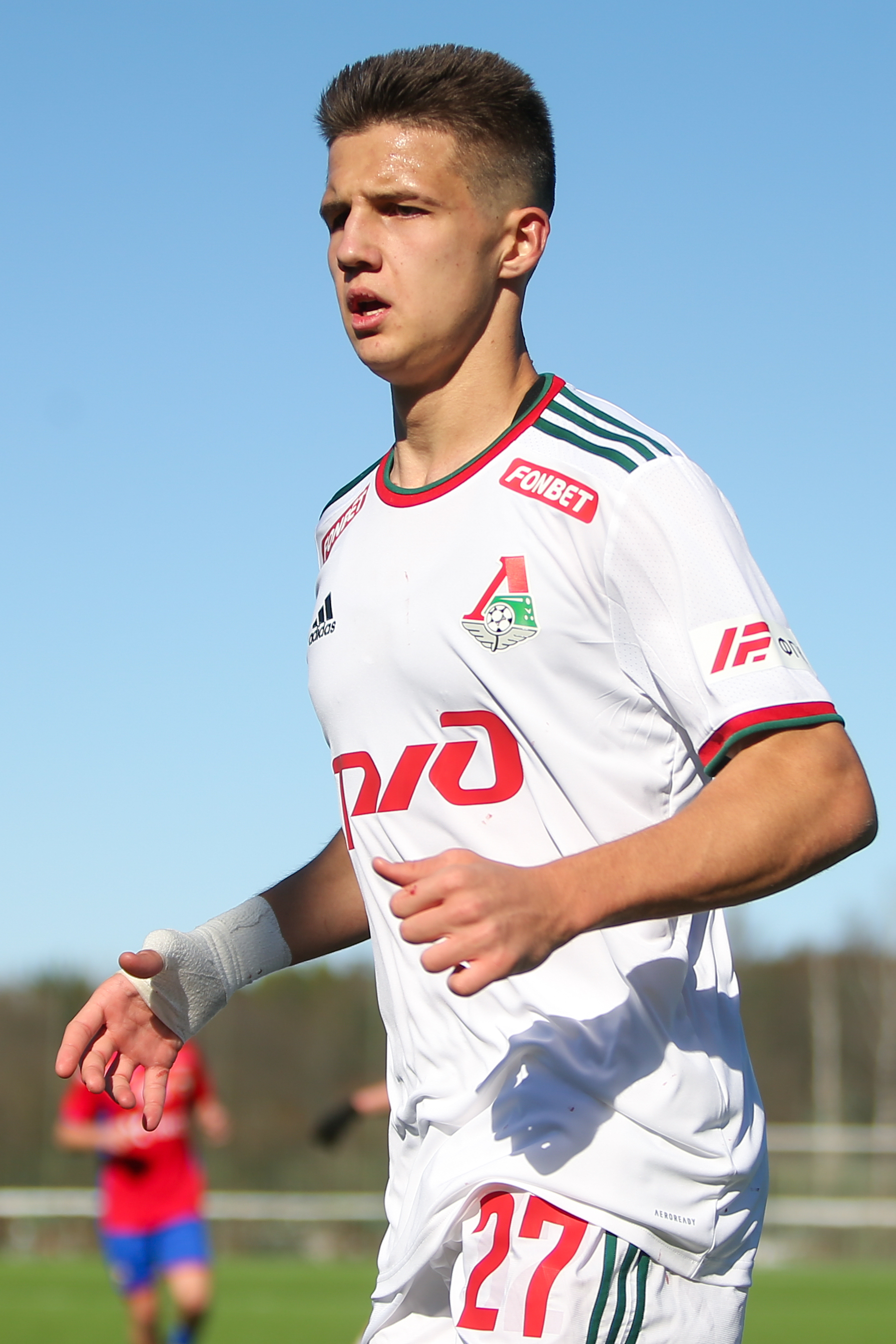
- Vadim Rakov at the Oktyabr Stadium in March 2023

Personal information
- Full name: Vadim Sergeyevich Rakov
- Date of birth: 9 January 2005 (age 21)
- Place of birth: Voronezh, Voronezh Oblast, Russian Federation
- Height: 1.78 m (5 ft 10 in)
- Position: Left winger

Team information
- Current team: Lokomotiv Moscow
- Number: 11

Youth career
- 2015–2022: Lokomotiv Moscow

Senior career*
Years	Team	Apps	(Gls)
2022–	Lokomotiv Moscow	44	(2)
2025–2026	→ Krylia Sovetov Samara (loan)	10	(5)

International career^{‡}
2020	Russia U15	2	(0)
2021–2022	Russia U17	5	(1)
2022	Russia U18	4	(1)
2023–2024	Russia U21	4	(1)
- * Club domestic league appearances and goals as of 22 November 2026 ‡ National team caps and goals as of 16 June 2026

Vadim Sergeyevich Rakov (Russian: Вадим Сергеевич Раков; born 9 January 2005) is a Russian footballer who plays as a left winger for Lokomotiv Moscow.

== Early life ==
Born in Voronezh, he began his football journey at the Fakel Voronezh Youth Academy. In 2015, at just 10 years old, he caught the attention of scouts during a regional Lokobol tournament and received an invitation to join the FC Lokomotiv Moscow Academy.

The forward played for Lokomotiv's 2005-born team and, in 2021, was recognized as the best player in Moscow for his age group.

Playing for Lokomotiv's youth team, he emerged as the top scorer in the UFL-2 (Russian Youth U-18 League), setting an all-time league record with an impressive 36 goals in 25 matches.

In the summer of 2022, Rakov completed a full training camp with Lokomotiv's first team and scored his debut goal in a friendly match.

== Club career ==
Rakov made his debut in the Russian Premier League for Lokomotiv Moscow on 13 August 2022 in a game against Krylia Sovetov Samara.

On 27 July 2023, Rakov extended his contract with Lokomotiv to June 2027.

On 2 July 2025, Rakov moved on loan to Krylia Sovetov Samara for the 2025–26 season. After starting the season with 4 goals in the first 3 league games, in September 2025 Rakov suffered a leg fracture that eventually required surgical intervention. On 15 April 2026, the loan was terminated early as he was not able to play for the rest of the season due to recovery.

On 15 June 2026, Rakov extended his Lokomotiv contract to 2030.

== International career ==
Rakov was actively involved with the Russian U17 national team, where he played five matches and scored once—netting a goal against Croatia (1:2).

He has represented Russia at various youth levels, including the U15, U17, U18, and U21 teams.

== Career statistics ==
As of match played 22 November 2026

Appearances and goals by club, season and competition
Club	Season	League			Russian Cup		Total	
Club	Season	Division	Apps	Goals	Apps	Goals	Apps	Goals
Lokomotiv Moscow	2022–23	Russian Premier League	9	0	4	0	13	0
Lokomotiv Moscow	2023–24	Russian Premier League	1	0	3	0	4	0
Lokomotiv Moscow	2024–25	Russian Premier League	20	1	9	2	29	3
Lokomotiv Moscow	2026–27	Russian Premier League	14	1	5	0	19	1
Lokomotiv Moscow	Total		44	2	21	2	65	4
Krylia Sovetov Samara (loan)	2025–26	Russian Premier League	10	5	1	0	11	5
Career total			54	7	22	2	76	9

== Honours ==
Lokomotiv Moscow U17

- Russian Youth Football League-2: 2021–22

Lokomotiv Moscow U19

- Russian Youth Championship: 2023
