= Daniil Khudyakov =

Russian footballer (born 2004)

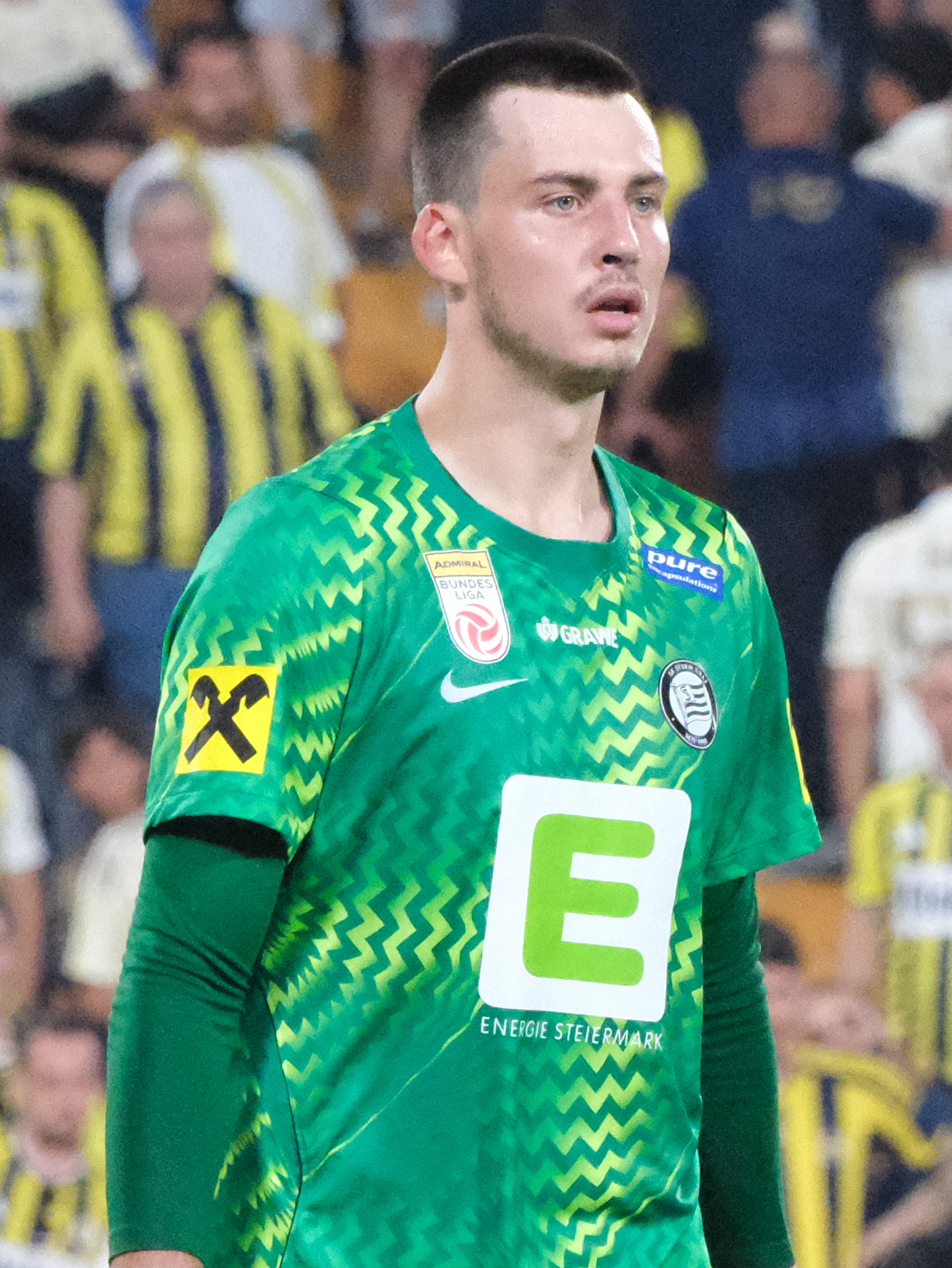
- Khudyakov with Sturm Graz in 2026

Personal information
- Full name: Daniil Dmitriyevich Khudyakov
- Date of birth: 9 January 2004 (age 22)
- Place of birth: Moscow, Russia
- Height: 1.94 m (6 ft 4 in)
- Position: Goalkeeper

Team information
- Current team: Sturm Graz
- Number: 53

Youth career
- –2020: Lokomotiv Moscow

Senior career*
Years	Team	Apps	(Gls)
2020–2022	Kazanka Moscow	15	(0)
2021–2024	Lokomotiv Moscow	26	(0)
2024–	Sturm Graz	17	(0)
2025	Sturm Graz II	5	(0)

International career^{‡}
2019–2020	Russia U16	4	(0)
2021	Russia U17	2	(0)
2021	Russia U18	2	(0)
2022	Russia U19	1	(0)
2022–2023	Russia U21	3	(0)
- * Club domestic league appearances and goals as of 18 October 2026 ‡ National team caps and goals as of 15 June 2023

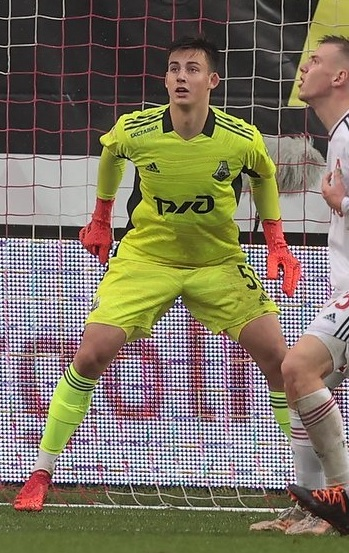
Khudyakov with Lokomotiv Moscow in 2021

Daniil Dmitriyevich Khudyakov (Russian: Даниил Дмитриевич Худяков; born 9 January 2004) is a Russian professional footballer who plays as a goalkeeper for Austrian club Sturm Graz.

== Club career ==
On 25 September 2021, Khudyakov made his debut in the Russian Premier League for Lokomotiv Moscow in a game against Khimki. He came on as a substitute in the second half after the starting goalkeeper Guilherme was sent off and kept the clean sheet for the remaining 42 minutes of play. He made his European debut on 25 November 2021 in an Europa League game against Lazio.

Khudyakov left Lokomotiv in June 2024 after his contract expired.

On 22 July 2024, Khudyakov signed a four-year contract with Sturm Graz in Austria.

== Career statistics ==
As of match played 18 October 2026

Appearances and goals by club, season and competition
Club	Season	League			National cup (Note: Includes Russian Cup and Austrian Cup)		Continental		Total	
Club	Season	Division	Apps	Goals	Apps	Goals	Apps	Goals	Apps	Goals
Kazanka Moscow	2020–21	Russian Second League	13	0	—		—		13	0
Kazanka Moscow	2021–22	Russian Second League	2	0	—		—		2	0
Kazanka Moscow	Total		15	0	0	0	0	0	15	0
Lokomotiv Moscow	2021–22	Russian Premier League	12	0	1	0	2 (Note: Appearances in UEFA Europa League)	0	15	0
Lokomotiv Moscow	2022–23	Russian Premier League	14	0	5	0	—		19	0
Lokomotiv Moscow	2023–24	Russian Premier League	0	0	0	0	—		0	0
Lokomotiv Moscow	Total		26	0	6	0	2	0	34	0
Sturm Graz	2024–25	Austrian Bundesliga	2	0	0	0	2 (Note: Appearances in UEFA Champions League)	0	4	0
Sturm Graz	2025–26	Austrian Bundesliga	8	0	1	0	2	0	11	0
Sturm Graz	2026–27	Austrian Bundesliga	7	0	2	0	6 (Note: Four appearances in UEFA Champions League, two appearances in UEFA Europa League)	0	15	0
Sturm Graz	Total		17	0	3	0	10	0	30	0
Sturm Graz II	2025–26	2. Liga	5	0	—		—		5	0
Career total			63	0	9	0	12	0	84	0

== Honours ==
Sturm Graz

- Austrian Bundesliga: 2024–25
