= Sergei Pinyayev =

Russian footballer (born 2004)

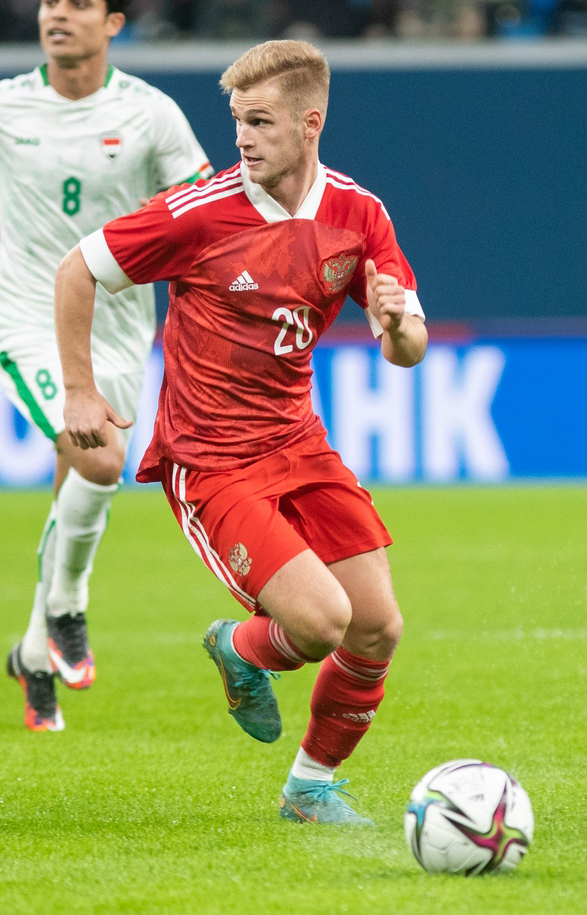
- Pinyayev with Russia in 2023

Personal information
- Full name: Sergei Maksimovich Pinyayev
- Date of birth: 2 November 2004 (age 22)
- Place of birth: Saratov, Russia
- Height: 1.70 m (5 ft 7 in)
- Position: Left winger

Team information
- Current team: Lokomotiv Moscow
- Number: 9

Youth career
- –2013: Torpedo Saratov
- 2013–2014: Lokomotiv Moscow
- 2015–2020: Chertanovo Education Center

Senior career*
| Years | Team | Apps | (Gls) |
| 2020–2021 | Chertanovo Moscow | 30 | (2) |
| 2021–2022 | Krylia Sovetov Samara | 39 | (5) |
| 2022– | Lokomotiv Moscow | 92 | (12) |

International career^{‡}
| 2018–2019 | Russia U-15 | 10 | (8) |
| 2018–2019 | Russia U-16 | 6 | (4) |
| 2019–2020 | Russia U-17 | 6 | (0) |
| 2021 | Russia U-19 | 9 | (3) |
| 2022– | Russia | 9 | (1) |
| 2023– | Russia U-23 | 1 | (1) |
- * Club domestic league appearances and goals as of 22 November 2026 ‡ National team caps and goals as of 10 June 2025

Sergei Maksimovich Pinyayev (Russian: Сергей Максимович Пиняев; born 2 November 2004) is a Russian professional footballer who plays for Lokomotiv Moscow and Russia national team as a left winger.

== Club career ==
Pinyayev made his debut in the Russian Football National League for Chertanovo Moscow on 1 August 2020 in a game against Spartak-2 Moscow, substituting Dmitri Molchanov in the 63rd minute. Pinyaev is the youngest player ever to score in the FNL. He scored in the game against Irtysh Omsk at the age of 15 years, 9 months and 10 days.

Pinyaev underwent a trial with Manchester United’s academy back in 2019, when he was just 15. But even before Brexit restrictions came in, as he was a non-EU player, United could not sign him.

He made his Russian Premier League debut for Krylia Sovetov Samara on 30 July 2021 in a game against Spartak Moscow. He scored his first goal on 22 September 2021, in the 10–0 Russian Cup elite group round win against Znamya Truda. He scored his first RPL goal on 11 December 2021 against Rubin Kazan at the age of 17 years and 39 days, becoming the third youngest goal scorer in RPL history, behind Jano Ananidze and Aleksandr Salugin.

On 20 July 2022, Pinyaev collapsed during a training session and was rushed to hospital, where he was diagnosed with a spontaneous pneumothorax. Reports indicated that he might need a surgery and up to six months to recover. He returned to play on 4 September 2022.

On 28 December 2022, Pinyaev signed a four-year contract with Lokomotiv Moscow. On 3 September 2024, he extended his contract with Lokomotiv to June 2028.

== International career ==
The youngest Russian junior national team player of all time, Pinyayev made his U16 debut at the age of 13 years and 9 months.

Pinyayev was called up to the Russia national team for the first time in November 2022 for friendly games against Tajikistan and Uzbekistan. He made his debut against Tajikistan on 17 November 2022 and became the youngest ever national team player at the age of 18 years and 15 days, beating the mark held by Igor Akinfeev.

On 26 March 2023, Pinyayev scored his first national team goal in a friendly against Iraq, becoming the youngest goalscorer in the history of the national team at the age of 18 years, 4 months and 24 days, overtaking the mark previously held by Dmitri Sychev.

== Career statistics ==
=== Club ===
As of match played 22 November 2026

Appearances and goals by club, season and competition
| Club | Season | League | | | Russian Cup | | Total | |
| Club | Season | Division | Apps | Goals | Apps | Goals | Apps | Goals |
|---|---|---|---|---|---|---|---|---|
| Chertanovo Moscow | 2020–21 | Russian First League | 30 | 2 | 1 | 0 | 31 | 2 |
| Krylia Sovetov Samara | 2021–22 | Russian Premier League | 28 | 2 | 2 | 2 | 30 | 4 |
| Krylia Sovetov Samara | 2022–23 | Russian Premier League | 11 | 3 | 4 | 1 | 15 | 4 |
| Krylia Sovetov Samara | Total | | 39 | 5 | 6 | 3 | 45 | 8 |
| Lokomotiv Moscow | 2022–23 | Russian Premier League | 9 | 2 | 7 | 1 | 16 | 3 |
| Lokomotiv Moscow | 2023–24 | Russian Premier League | 29 | 3 | 9 | 0 | 38 | 3 |
| Lokomotiv Moscow | 2024–25 | Russian Premier League | 28 | 5 | 10 | 6 | 38 | 11 |
| Lokomotiv Moscow | 2025–26 | Russian Premier League | 12 | 1 | 4 | 0 | 16 | 1 |
| Lokomotiv Moscow | 2026–27 | Russian Premier League | 14 | 1 | 4 | 1 | 18 | 2 |
| Lokomotiv Moscow | Total | | 92 | 12 | 34 | 8 | 126 | 20 |
| Career total | | | 161 | 19 | 41 | 11 | 202 | 30 |

=== International ===
As of match played 10 June 2025

Appearances and goals by national team and year
| National team | Year | Apps | Goals |
|---|---|---|---|
| Russia | 2022 | 2 | 0 |
| Russia | 2023 | 4 | 1 |
| Russia | 2024 | 2 | 0 |
| Russia | 2025 | 1 | 0 |
| Total | | 9 | 1 |

Scores and results list Russia's goal tally first.

| No. | Date | Venue | Opponent | Score | Result | Competition |
|---|---|---|---|---|---|---|
| 1. | 26 March 2023 | Krestovsky Stadium, Saint Petersburg, Russia | Iraq | 2–0 | 2–0 | Friendly |
