= Nair Tiknizyan =

Armenian footballer (born 1999)

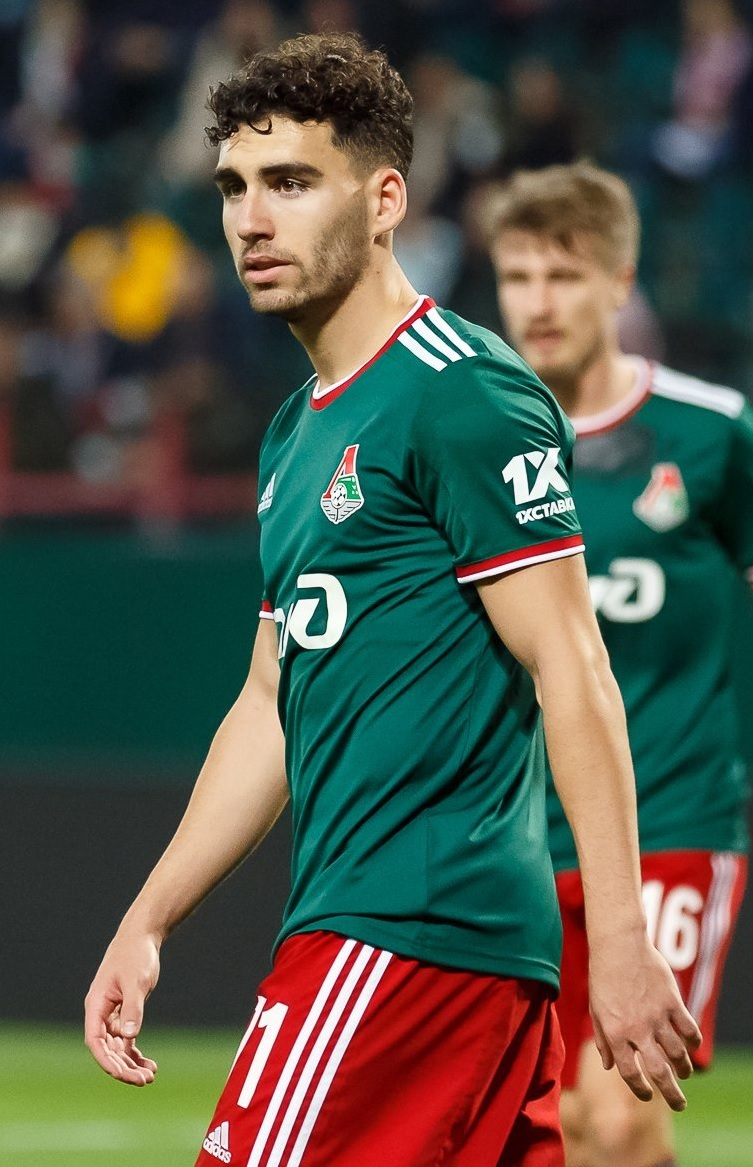
- Tiknizyan with Lokomotiv Moscow in 2021

Personal information
- Full name: Nair Oganesovich Tiknizyan
- Date of birth: 12 May 1999 (age 27)
- Place of birth: Saint Petersburg, Russia
- Height: 1.81 m (5 ft 11 in)
- Position: Left-back

Team information
- Current team: Olympiacos
- Number: 71

Youth career
- 2005–2008: Fakel St. Petersburg
- 2008–2011: Kolomyagi St. Petersburg
- 2011–2013: Lokomotiv-Primorsky St. Petersburg
- 2013–2019: CSKA Moscow

Senior career*
Years	Team	Apps	(Gls)
2017–2021	CSKA Moscow	34	(2)
2020	→ Avangard Kursk (loan)	2	(0)
2021–2025	Lokomotiv Moscow	92	(12)
2025–2026	Red Star Belgrade	29	(1)
2026–	Olympiacos	10	(0)

International career^{‡}
2017	Russia U19	5	(1)
2020–2021	Russia U21	7	(1)
2023–	Armenia	37	(1)
- * Club domestic league appearances and goals as of 22 November 2026 ‡ National team caps and goals as of 15 November 2026

Nair Oganesovich Tiknizyan (Armenian: Նաիր Հովհաննեսի Տիկնիզյան; Russian: Наир Оганесович Тикнизян; born 12 May 1999) is a professional footballer who plays as a left-back for Greek Super League club Olympiacos. Born in Russia, he plays for the Armenia national team.

== Club career ==
=== CSKA Moscow ===
Tiknizyan made his debut for the main squad of CSKA Moscow on 20 September 2017 in a Russian Cup game against Avangard Kursk. He made his second appearance on 10 October 2018 in a Russian Cup game against Tyumen.

On 9 January 2019, CSKA Moscow announced that Tiknizyan had signed a new contract with the club until the summer of 2022.

He made his Russian Premier League debut for CSKA on 25 August 2019 in a game against Akhmat Grozny, as a 89th-minute substitute for Ivan Oblyakov.

On 20 January 2020, Tiknizyan moved on loan to Avangard Kursk until the end of the 2019–20 season.

On 11 September 2020, Tiknizyan extended his contract with CSKA until the end of the 2024–25 season.

=== Lokomotiv Moscow ===
On 4 August 2021, Lokomotiv Moscow announced the signing of Tiknizyan on a five-year deal.

=== Red Star Belgrade ===
On 22 June 2025, Tiknizyan signed with Red Star Belgrade in Serbia.

== International career ==
Tiknizyan represented Russia at the 2021 UEFA European Under-21 Championship and scored a goal in their opening group stage 4–1 victory against Iceland. Russia lost two remaining games and was eliminated at group stage.

In March 2023, Tiknizyan was called up to the Armenia national team.

Tiknizyan made his international debut for Armenia on 25 March 2023 in the UEFA Euro 2024 qualifying, against Turkey. He played the entire match. He scored his first goal for Armenia on 19 June 2023 against Latvia.

== Personal life ==
Official sources such as UEFA or Russian Premier League list his first name as Nayair (Russian: Наяир). The clerk who issued his birth certificate made a mistake which has been perpetuated in all official documents since. Tiknizyan himself said he can not find the time to officially petition for a change of name.

== Career statistics ==
=== Club ===
As of match played 11 August 2026

Appearances and goals by club, season and competition
Club	Season	League			National cup (Note: Includes Russian Cup, Serbian Cup)		Europe		Other		Total	
Club	Season	Division	Apps	Goals	Apps	Goals	Apps	Goals	Apps	Goals	Apps	Goals
CSKA Moscow	2017–18	Russian Premier League	0	0	1	0	0	0	0	0	1	0
CSKA Moscow	2018–19	Russian Premier League	0	0	1	0	0	0	0	0	1	0
CSKA Moscow	2019–20	Russian Premier League	5	0	1	0	0	0	0	0	6	0
CSKA Moscow	2020–21	Russian Premier League	28	2	1	0	5 (Note: Appearances in UEFA Europa League)	0	0	0	34	2
CSKA Moscow	2021–22	Russian Premier League	1	0	—		—		—		1	0
CSKA Moscow	Total		34	2	4	0	5	0	0	0	43	2
Avangard Kursk (loan)	2019–20	Russian First League	2	0	0	0	—		—		2	0
Lokomotiv Moscow	2021–22	Russian Premier League	18	0	1	0	3	0	—		22	0
Lokomotiv Moscow	2022–23	Russian Premier League	29	4	8	1	—		—		37	5
Lokomotiv Moscow	2023–24	Russian Premier League	22	6	8	3	—		—		30	9
Lokomotiv Moscow	2024–25	Russian Premier League	23	2	10	0	—		—		33	2
Lokomotiv Moscow	Total		92	12	27	4	3	0	—		122	16
Red Star Belgrade	2025–26	Serbian SuperLiga	26	1	4	1	16 (Note: Six appearances in UEFA Champions League, ten appearances in UEFA Europa League)	0	—		46	2
Red Star Belgrade	2026–27	Serbian SuperLiga	3	0	0	0	4 (Note: Four appearances in UEFA Champions League)	0	—		7	0
Red Star Belgrade	Total		29	1	4	1	20	0	—		53	2
Career total			157	15	35	5	28	0	0	0	220	20

=== International ===
As of matches played 15 November 2026

Appearances and goals by national team and year
National team	Year	Apps	Goals
Armenia	2023	10	1
Armenia	2024	8	0
Armenia	2025	10	0
Armenia	2026	9	0
Total		37	1

Scores and results list Armenia's goal tally first, score column indicates score after each Tiknizyan goal.

List of international goals scored by Nair Tiknizyan
No.	Date	Venue	Opponent	Score	Result	Competition
1	19 June 2023	Vazgen Sargsyan Republican Stadium, Yerevan, Armenia	Latvia	1–0	2–1	UEFA Euro 2024 qualification

== Honors ==
CSKA Moscow

- Russian Super Cup: 2018

Red Star Belgrade

- Serbian SuperLiga: 2025–26
- Serbian Cup: 2025–26
