= Dmitry Vorobyov (footballer) =

Russian footballer

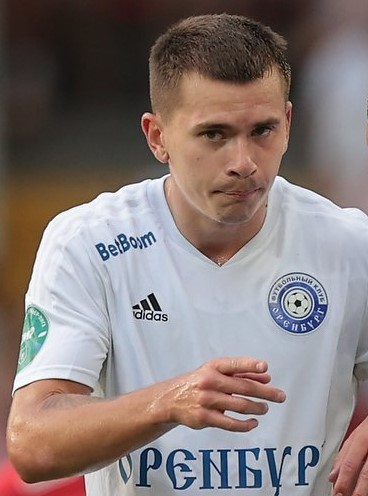
- Vorobyov with Orenburg in 2022

Personal information
- Full name: Dmitry Dmitriyevich Vorobyov
- Date of birth: 28 November 1997 (age 28)
- Place of birth: Kubanskaya Step, Russia
- Height: 1.85 m (6 ft 1 in)
- Position: Forward

Team information
- Current team: Krasnodar
- Number: 10

Youth career
- –2017: Krasnodar

Senior career*
Years	Team	Apps	(Gls)
2014–2017	Krasnodar-2	72	(20)
2016–2018	Krasnodar	0	(0)
2018	→ Afips Afipsky (loan)	12	(2)
2018–2019	Hradec Králové	3	(0)
2019–2020	Nizhny Novgorod	10	(0)
2019–2020	→ Volgar Astrakhan (loan)	15	(4)
2020	Volgar Astrakhan	23	(12)
2021–2024	Orenburg	64	(29)
2021–2022	→ Sochi (loan)	11	(0)
2024–2026	Lokomotiv Moscow	56	(22)
2026–	Krasnodar	13	(0)

International career^{‡}
2015	Russia U-18	4	(0)
2015	Russia U-19	2	(0)
2024–	Russia	4	(1)
- * Club domestic league appearances and goals as of 22 November 2026 ‡ National team caps and goals as of 20:02, 5 October 2026 (UTC)

Dmitry Dmitriyevich Vorobyov (Russian: Дми́трий Дми́триевич Воробьёв; born 28 November 1997) is a Russian football player who plays for Krasnodar and the Russia national team. He plays as either a centre-forward or a winger.

== Club career ==
Vorobyov made his debut in the Russian Professional Football League for Krasnodar-2 on 10 April 2014 in a game against Mashuk-KMV Pyatigorsk.

He has made his debut for the main Krasnodar squad in a 2016–17 UEFA Europa League play-off round game against Partizani Tirana on 25 August 2016.

In October 2018, Vorobyov joined Czech club Hradec Králové.

On 19 July 2021, he joined Russian Premier League club Sochi on loan. He made his RPL debut for Sochi on 26 July 2021 in a game against Nizhny Novgorod.

On 10 June 2024, Vorobyov signed a three-year contract with Lokomotiv Moscow.

On 18 July 2026, Vorobyov returned to Krasnodar and signed a four-year contract with the club.

== International career ==
Vorobyov was first called up to the Russia national team for 2024 LPBank Cup in September 2024. He made his debut on 5 September 2024 in a game against Vietnam.

== Honours ==
=== Individual ===
- Russian Premier League Player of the Month: October 2025.
- Russian Premier League Goal of the Month: October 2025 (against CSKA on 18 October).
- Russian Premier League Goal of the Season: 2025–26 (against CSKA on 18 October).

== Career statistics ==
=== Club ===
As of match played 22 November 2026

Appearances and goals by club, season and competition
Club	Season	League			Cup		Europe		Other		Total	
Club	Season	Division	Apps	Goals	Apps	Goals	Apps	Goals	Apps	Goals	Apps	Goals
Krasnodar-2	2013–14	Russian Second League	6	1	—		—		—		6	1
Krasnodar-2	2014–15	Russian Second League	10	5	—		—		—		10	5
Krasnodar-2	2015–16	Russian Second League	14	2	—		—		2 (Note: Appearances in the FNL Cup)	0	16	2
Krasnodar-2	2016–17	Russian Second League	28	7	—		—		3	0	31	7
Krasnodar-2	2017–18	Russian Second League	14	5	—		—		1	0	15	5
Krasnodar-2	Total		72	20	0	0	0	0	6	0	78	20
Krasnodar	2016–17	Russian Premier League	0	0	0	0	1 (Note: Appearance in the UEFA Europa League)	0	—		1	0
Afips Afipsky	2017–18	Russian Second League	12	2	—		—		—		12	2
Hradec Králové	2018–19	Czech National Football League	3	0	—		—		—		3	0
Nizhny Novgorod	2018–19	Russian First League	10	0	—		—		0	0	10	0
Volgar Astrakhan	2019–20	Russian Second League	15	4	2	0	—		—		17	4
Volgar Astrakhan	2020–21	Russian First League	23	12	0	0	—		—		23	12
Volgar Astrakhan	Total		38	16	2	0	0	0	0	0	40	16
Orenburg	2020–21	Russian First League	16	12	—		—		—		16	12
Orenburg	2021–22	Russian First League	2	1	—		—		—		2	1
Orenburg	2022–23	Russian Premier League	22	8	2	1	—		—		24	9
Orenburg	2023–24	Russian Premier League	24	8	7	0	—		—		31	8
Orenburg	Total		64	29	9	1	0	0	0	0	73	30
Sochi (loan)	2021–22	Russian Premier League	11	0	0	0	3 (Note: Appearances in the UEFA Europa Conference League)	0	—		14	0
Lokomotiv Moscow	2024–25	Russian Premier League	30	12	9	1	—		—		39	13
Lokomotiv Moscow	2025–26	Russian Premier League	26	10	8	2	—		—		34	12
Lokomotiv Moscow	Total		56	22	17	3	0	0	0	0	73	25
Krasnodar	2026–27	Russian Premier League	13	0	5	2	—		—		18	2
Krasnodar	Club total		13	0	5	2	1	0	0	0	19	2
Career total			279	89	33	5	4	0	6	0	322	95

=== International ===
As of match played 31 March 2026

Appearances and goals by national team and year
National team	Year	Apps	Goals
Russia	2024	1	0
Russia	2025	2	1
Russia	2026	1	0
Total		4	1

Scores and results list Russia goal tally first, score column indicates score after each Voroboyov goal

List of international goals scored by Dmitry Voroboyov
No.	Date	Venue	Opponent	Score	Result	Competition
1	10 October 2025	Volgograd Arena, Volgograd, Russia	Iran	1–0	2–1	Friendly
