= FC Kazanka Moscow =

- Full name: Футбольный клуб "Казанка" Москва (Football Club Kazanka Moscow)
- Nickname(s): Loko-2
- Founded: 13 February 2008; 17 years ago, as FC Lokomotiv-2 Moscow
- Manager: Vacant
- League: Moscow Championship
- 2021–22: FNL 2, Group 2, 12th
- Website: fckazanka.ru
Home colours	Away colours	Third colours

FC Kazanka Moscow (Russian: Футбольный клуб "Казанка" Москва, FK Kazanka Moskva) is a Russian association football club based in Moscow. Kazanka participated in the FNL 2 and acts as the farm club of Lokomotiv Moscow. The club play on the amateur level, in the championship of Moscow in 2022.

== History ==
=== Lokomotiv-d Moscow ===
In 1992, Lokomotiv-d Moscow was established to act as Lokomotiv's first farm club ever. In their first season, Lokomotiv-d participated in the 1992 Russian Second League, Zone 3 and, overall, greatly disappointed as they have only managed to beat the drop. In the following season, Lokomotiv-d's performances deteriorated and ended-up rock bottom of the league, thereby ensuring that the club's relegation was not only consequent to the reorganisation made by the Russian Football Authorities.

Lokomotiv'd's performances in the Russian fourth tier did not improve as the club ended in the wrong part of the table in both 1994 and 1995. In the following season 1996, Lokomotiv-d rocked the bottom of the league once again but owing to the relegation of three other clubs, the club was not relegated.

In the next and last edition of the Russian Third League, Lokomotiv-d were promoted to the Russian Second Division. The club's promotion was down to Lokomotiv's-d own merit as the club languished at the wrong end of the table once again but the second reorganisation made by the Russian Football Authorities ensured that Lokomotiv-d were promoted to the third tier.

=== Lokomotiv-2 Moscow ===
Following their promotion to the third tier, Lokomotiv-d were renamed to Lokomotiv-2 Moscow but the re-branding was not match with any improvements on the pitch as Lokomotiv-2 Moscow ended up at the lower echelons of the Russian Second Division in both 1998 and 1999.

In the following season, Lokomotiv-2's performances improved marginally but at the end of the season the club was disbanded.

=== Lokomotiv-2 Moscow (Re-founded) ===
On 13 February 2008, Lokomotiv-2 Moscow was re-founded with the aim of participating in the Russian Amateur Football League and gain promotion to the Russian Second Division. Lokomotiv-2's performances in the 2008 championship was overall a success as the club secured the bronze medals by beating Zenit Moscow on the final day in front of a sizeable crowd.

Financial problems of clubs which participated in the 2008 Russian Second Division resulted in Lokomotiv-2 being promoted to the said division. The first season was overall a success as the club ended in the upper parts of the table. Despite the positive performances which followed, the fact that the club did not remain connected to Lokomotiv notwithstanding it being Lokomotiv's farm club, took its toll on Lokomotiv-2 and following the conclusion of the 2013-2014 Russian Second Division championship, the club was disbanded.

=== Kazanka Moscow ===
On 24 May 2017, Lokomotiv's president Mr Ilya Herkus announced the foundation of Lokomotiv-Kazanka with the purpose of acting as Lokomotiv's farm club once again. Denis Klyuyev was appointed as the club's head coach and Sapsan Arena was chosen as Lokomotiv-Kazanka's home stadium. On 5 July 2017, Lokomotiv-Kazanka was officially launched but in reversal of the original statement, Lokomotiv was dropped and the club was named Kazanka.

On 17 June 2022, Lokomotiv announced that Kazanka will not enter the 2022–23 FNL2 season and will play on the amateur level, in the championship of Moscow.

== Stadium ==
The club played its home games at the Sapsan Arena, which is situated a few metres away from Lokomotiv's main stadium, the RZD Arena.

== See also ==
- FC Lokomotiv Moscow
- WFC Lokomotiv Moscow
- RC Lokomotiv Moscow
