= 2023–24 Russian Cup =

2023–24 Fonbet Russian Cup

Tournament details
- Country: Russia
- Teams: 107

Final positions
- Champions: Zenit Saint Petersburg (5th title)
- Runners-up: Baltika Kaliningrad

Tournament statistics
- Matches played: 163
- Goals scored: 393 (2.41 per match)
- Attendance: 1,137,027 (6,976 per match)
- Top goal scorer(s): Ivan Sergeyev; Aleksandr Sobolev; Timur Suleymanov (5 goals each)
- All statistics correct as of 2 June 2024.

The 2023–24 Russian Cup is the 32nd season of the Russian football knockout tournament since the dissolution of the Soviet Union. The competition started on 25 July 2023 and will conclude on 2 June 2024.

The winner of the cup would normally gain entry into the 2024–25 UEFA Europa League; however, on 28 February 2022, Russian football clubs were suspended from FIFA & UEFA international competitions until further notice due to the Russian invasion of Ukraine.

== Representation of clubs by league ==
- Russian Premier League (1): 16 clubs
- Russian First League (2): 18 clubs
- Division A of Russian Second League (3): 18 clubs (without 2 farm teams)
- Division B of Russian Second League (4): 42 clubs (without 16 farm teams and 2 Crimean teams)
- Amateur leagues:
  - Third division (5): 8 clubs
  - Fourth division (regional leagues) (6): 2 clubs
  - Media amateur clubs (7): 3 clubs
- Total: 107 clubs.

== Distribution ==
The teams of Premier League and the other teams will qualify to knockout phase in two different paths. Premier league teams will play in the RPL path group stage with a double round-robin tournament, divided into 4 groups with 4 teams in each group, while the other teams will play in the regions path qualification, starting with 1/256 round until 1/8 round with 1 match in each stage.

== Round dates ==
The schedule of the competition is as follows:

Phase	Round			Match date
Qualifying rounds (regions path)	Round 1			1–2 August 2023
Qualifying rounds (regions path)	Round 2			22–23 August 2023
Qualifying rounds (regions path)	Round 3			4, 13–14 September 2023
Qualifying rounds (regions path)	Round 4			26–28 September 2023
Qualifying rounds (regions path)	Round 5			17–19 October 2023
Qualifying rounds (regions path)	Round 6			1–2 November 2023
Group stage (RPL path)	Matchday 1			25–27 July 2023
Group stage (RPL path)	Matchday 2			8–10 August 2023
Group stage (RPL path)	Matchday 3			29–30 August 2023
Group stage (RPL path)	Matchday 4			19–21 September 2023
Group stage (RPL path)	Matchday 5			3–4 October 2023
Group stage (RPL path)	Matchday 6			31 October – 2 November 2023
Knockout stage	Quarter-finals	RPL path	Match 1	28–29 November 2023
Knockout stage	Quarter-finals	RPL path	Match 2	12–14 March 2024
Knockout stage	Quarter-finals	Regions path	Stage 1	12–14 March 2024
Knockout stage	Quarter-finals	Regions path	Stage 2	2–4 April 2024
Knockout stage	Semi-finals	RPL path	Match 1	2–4 April 2024
Knockout stage	Semi-finals	RPL path	Match 2	16–18 April 2024
Knockout stage	Semi-finals	Regions path	Stage 1	16–18 April 2024
Knockout stage	Semi-finals	Regions path	Stage 2	30 April – 2 May 2024
Knockout stage	Path finals	RPL path	Match 1	30 April – 2 May 2024
Knockout stage	Path finals	RPL path	Match 2	14–16 May 2024
Knockout stage	Path finals	Regions path		14–16 May 2024
Knockout stage	Final			2 June 2024

== Qualifying round (regions path) ==
The draw for qualifying stage rounds 1 and 2 was held on 17 July 2023.

=== Round 1 ===
Date of matches was determined on 21 July 2023.

Entered clubs:

- 13 clubs from Amateur leagues
- 21 lowest clubs from Russian Second League Division B

Times are MSK (UTC+3), as listed by RFU (local times, if different, are in parentheses).

1 August 2023	Amkal Moscow (7)	3–2	Krasnoye Znamya Noginsk (4)	Moscow
19:30	Katrich 29'; Lobkaryov 61'; Marichev 72'	Report	Salamatov 31'; Vansovich 85'	Stadium: Spartak Academy Stadium; Attendance: 1,250; Referee: Sergey Cheban

2 August 2023	Dalnerechensk (5)	Cancelled	Irkutsk (4)
10:00 (17:00 VLAT)

2 August 2023	Strogino Moscow (4)	2–3	Znamya Truda Orekhovo-Zuyevo (4)	Moscow
13:00	Krol 42'; Nikiforov 49' (pen.)	Report	Shanin 75', 79'; Akhilgov 76'	Stadium: Yantar Stadium; Attendance: 150; Referee: Sergey Kolesnik

2 August 2023	Temp Barnaul (5)	0–3	Dynamo Barnaul (4)	Barnaul
14:30 (18:30 KRAT)		Report	Zhitnikov 55'; Yarkin 69'; Grishakov 90+3'	Stadium: Dynamo Stadium; Attendance: 5,000; Referee: Dmitry Golov

2 August 2023	Nosta Novotroitsk (4)	0–0 (3–2 p)	Uralets-TS Nizhny Tagil (4)	Novotroitsk
16:00 (18:00 YEKT)		Report		Stadium: Metallurg Stadium; Attendance: 330; Referee: Igor Kaplenkov
	Penalties
	Telenkov (penalty scored); Morgunov (penalty scored); Makushkin (penalty missed); Volchkov (penalty missed); Timchenko (penalty scored)		(penalty missed) Drozhalkin; (penalty scored) Kadermetov; (penalty scored) Mosunov; (penalty missed) Zhuravlyov; (penalty missed) Mylnikov

2 August 2023	Rodina Media Moscow (7)	0–3	Dynamo Vologda (4)	Moscow
16:30		Report	Meshalkin 31'; Bashirov 50'; Tumanyan 89'	Stadium: Spartakovets Stadium; Attendance: 329; Referee: Mikhail Taran

2 August 2023	Pioner Leningradskaya (6)	3–3 (2–4 p)	Druzhba Maykop (4)	Pavlovskaya
17:00	Melnik 13'; Benedyk 25', 72'	Report	Datkhuzhev 3'; Kadiyev 51'; Delok 90+1' (pen.)	Stadium: Urozhay Stadium; Attendance: 470; Referee: Viktor Latsviyev
	Penalties
	Filippidi (penalty scored); Suleymanov (penalty missed); Tupikhin (penalty scored); Khagup (penalty missed)		(penalty scored) Delok; (penalty scored) Arkhipov; (penalty scored) Yagyayev; (penalty scored) Datkhuzhev

2 August 2023	Dynamo Kirov (4)	2–0	Kompozit Pavlovsky Posad (4)	Kirov
17:00	Lazarev 53'; Pozdnyakov 90+3'	Report		Stadium: VyatSShOR Stadium; Attendance: 796; Referee: Kirill Garafutdinov

2 August 2023	Tver (4)	2–1	Elektron Veliky Novgorod (4)	Tver
17:00	Tsygankov 27'; Dzhebov 63'	Report	Korkin 69' (o.g.)	Stadium: Yunnost Stadium; Attendance: 265; Referee: Danila Tsurkov

2 August 2023	Ilpar Ilyinsky (5)	1–3	Torpedo Miass (4)	Perm
17:00 (19:00 YEKT)	Paramonov 81' (pen.)	Report	Gaydamak 15'; Levchenko 21'; Akvazba 90+3'	Stadium: Zvezda Stadium; Attendance: 350; Referee: Mikhail Yakovlev

2 August 2023	StavropolAgroSoyuz Nevinnomyssk (5)	0–3	Mashuk-KMV Pyatigorsk (4)	Stavropol
17:30		Report	Agabalayev 18'; Gusengadzhiyev 64'; Magomedov 78'	Stadium: Dynamo Stadium; Attendance: 200; Referee: Danil Naboka

2 August 2023	Atom Novovoronezh (5)	1–1 (4–5 p)	Spartak Tambov (4)	Novovoronezh
17:30	Kolpakov 88'	Report	Ganus 77'	Stadium: Start Stadium; Attendance: 800; Referee: Andrey Strelkov
	Penalties
	Sapelnikov (penalty missed); Mezinov (penalty scored); Akulov (penalty scored); Batishchev (penalty scored); Kolpakov (penalty scored); Romanov (penalty missed)		(penalty scored) Skrypnikov; (penalty scored) Pchelintsev; (penalty scored) Gorelov; (penalty scored) Repyakh; (penalty missed) Golovnya; (penalty scored) Krivoruchko

2 August 2023	Kolomna (4)	0–7	Kvant Obninsk (4)	Kolomna
18:00		Report	Yerastov 26' (o.g.); Volkov 29'; Baranov 37'; Skobelin 69'; Yuldashev 79'; Ositsyn 89', 90'	Stadium: Trud Stadium; Attendance: 283; Referee: Vladislav Bykov

2 August 2023	FShM Moscow (5)	0–0 (2–3 p)	Peresvet Domodedovo (4)	Moscow
18:30		Report		Stadium: Yantar Stadium; Attendance: 100; Referee: Dmitriy Kraynov
	Penalties
	Shkoda (penalty scored); Yerkov (penalty missed); Gorunkov (penalty missed); Adylbek (penalty scored); Uvarov (penalty missed)		(penalty scored) Abdulmedzhidov; (penalty missed) Novruzov; (penalty scored) Kormishin; (penalty scored) Zemlyanskiy; (penalty missed) Melnichenko

2 August 2023	Kirovets-Voskhozhdeniye Saint Petersburg (6)	0–1	Dynamo Saint Petersburg (4)	Saint Petersburg
19:00		Report	Gavrilenko 40'	Stadium: Kirovets Stadium; Attendance: 440; Referee: Nikita Novikov

2 August 2023	Pskov (5)	2–3	Luki-Energiya Velikiye Luki (4)	Pskov
19:00	Fedorov 20'; Shishayev 53'	Report	Strebtsov 7'; Yegorov 55'; Shepet 77'	Stadium: Mashinostroitel Stadium; Attendance: 3,500; Referee: Yefim Rubtsov

2 August 2023	Universitet Ulyanovsk (5)	1–1 (4–2 p)	Orgenergostroy Dimitrovgrad (5)	Ulyanovsk
19:00 (20:00 SAMT)	Zhigalov 32'	Report	Kuznetsov 47'	Stadium: Trud Stadium; Attendance: 650; Referee: Andrey Meshkov
	Penalties
	Prokopenko (penalty scored); Dubrovskiy (penalty scored); Kleyner (penalty scored); (Note: At the time of making the edit, the names were not listed on the site.) (penalty scored)		(penalty missed) Logunov; (penalty scored) Nuretdinov; (penalty scored) Klopkov; (penalty missed) Vafin

2 August 2023	2Drots Moscow (7)	2–0	Sakhalin Yuzhno-Sakhalinsk (4)	Moscow
19:30	Gudayev 70' (pen.); Frolov 73'	Report		Stadium: Moskvich Stadium; Attendance: 2,350; Referee: Yan Marushko

=== Round 2 ===
Entered clubs:

- 17 winners of Round 1
- 21 highest clubs from Russian Second League Division B, including FC Irkutsk
- 18 clubs from Russian Second League Division A

Date of matches was determined on 15 August 2023.

Times are MSK (UTC+3), as listed by RFU (local times, if different, are in parentheses).

22 August 2023	Ryazan (4)	2–1	Kosmos Dolgoprudny (4)	Kolomna
13:00	Markov 37'; Purak 79'	Report	Levchenkov 54'	Stadium: Trud Stadium; Attendance: 80; Referee: Kirill Garafutdinov

22 August 2023	Torpedo Miass (4)	0–0 (4–5 p)	Amkar Perm (3)	Miass
15:00 (17:00 YEKT)		Report		Stadium: Trud Stadium; Attendance: 550; Referee: Artyom Kataykin
	Penalties
	Yemelyanov (penalty scored); Matviyenko (penalty scored); Shpitalny (penalty scored); Zamyatin (penalty scored); Fedosyuk (penalty missed)		(penalty scored) Tyukalov; (penalty scored) Demin; (penalty scored) Kravchenko; (penalty scored) Martusevich; (penalty scored) Morozov

22 August 2023	Sakhalinets Moscow (4)	0–2	Leon Saturn Ramenskoye (4)	Moscow
16:30		Report	Predeus 48'; Melekestsev 68' (pen.)	Stadium: Spartak Academy Stadium; Attendance: 300; Referee: Taras Shevchenko

22 August 2023	Chelyabinsk (3)	1–0	Irtysh Omsk (3)	Chelyabinsk
16:30 (18:30 YEKT)	Kozlov 49'	Report		Stadium: Central Stadium; Attendance: 1,500; Referee: Igor Panin

22 August 2023	Astrakhan (4)	0–1	Rotor Volgograd (3)	Astrakhan
17:00 (18:00 SAMT)		Report	Rodionov 35'	Stadium: SC Astrakhan Stadium; Attendance: 1,300; Referee: Kirill Silantyev

22 August 2023	Tekstilshchik Ivanovo (3)	0–0 (4–3 p)	Amkal Moscow (7)	Ivanovo
19:00		Report		Stadium: Tekstilshchik Stadium; Attendance: 4,956; Referee: Andrey Prokopov
	Penalties
	Yefremov (penalty scored); Simdyankin (penalty scored); Klimov (penalty scored); Lyamzin (penalty missed); Gorovykh (penalty scored)		(penalty scored) Shurygin; (penalty missed) Dubchak; (penalty scored) Imayev; (penalty missed) Katrich; (penalty scored) Prokopyev

23 August 2023	Dynamo Barnaul (4)	3–2	Novosibirsk (3)	Barnaul
13:00 (17:00 KRAT)	Yarkin 36'; Fominykh 77'; Leonov 81'	Report	Glukhov 54'; Bakharev 84'	Stadium: Dynamo Stadium; Attendance: 2,100; Referee: Stanislav Matveyev

23 August 2023	Chertanovo Moscow (3)	0–1	Dynamo Kirov (4)	Moscow
14:00		Report	Yurchenko 45+1'	Stadium: Arena Chertanovo; Attendance: 146; Referee: Vera Opeykina

23 August 2023	Khimik-Avgust Vurnary (4)	1–1 (4–3 p)	Zenit Penza (4)	Vurnary
14:00	Bychkov 33' (pen.)	Report	Sergeyev 52'	Stadium: Khimik Stadium; Attendance: 510; Referee: Vladislav Rybakov
	Penalties
	Bychkov (penalty scored); Fomin (penalty missed); Vasilyev (penalty scored); Davydenko (penalty scored); Shamayev (penalty scored)		(penalty scored) Yermakov; (penalty scored) Levkin; (penalty scored) Yamlikhanov; (penalty missed) Osinov; (penalty missed) Margiyev

23 August 2023	Irkutsk (4)	0–0 (2–4 p)	Dynamo Vladivostok (4)	Irkutsk
14:00 (19:00 IRKT)		Report		Stadium: Trud Stadium; Attendance: 4,000; Referee: Maksim Perezva

23 August 2023	Legion Makhachkala (4)	1–0	Pobeda Khasavyurt (4)	Makhachkala
16:00	Abulashev 81'	Report		Stadium: Yelena Isinbayeva Stadium; Attendance: 200; Referee: Igor Kaplenkov

23 August 2023	Ufa (3)	0–0 (3–1 p)	Nosta Novotroitsk (4)	Ufa
16:00 (18:00 YEKT)		Report		Stadium: Neftyanik Stadium; Attendance: 1,321; Referee: Aleksandr Mayun

23 August 2023	Dynamo Vologda (4)	0–0 (7–6 p)	Spartak Kostroma (3)	Vologda
16:30		Report		Stadium: Dynamo Stadium; Attendance: 2,385; Referee: Igor Zakharov

23 August 2023	Mashuk-KMV Pyatigorsk (4)	0–1	Biolog-Novokubansk (4)	Pyatigorsk
17:00		Report	Polyakh 40'	Stadium: Central Stadium; Attendance: 830; Referee: Dmitry Matveyev

23 August 2023	SKA Rostov-on-Don (4)	2–1	Chayka Peschanokopskoye (3)	Rostov-on-Don
17:00	Kashtan 12'; Solomatin 59'	Report	Dolgov 72'	Stadium: SKA Stadium; Attendance: 486; Referee: Yury Matveyev

23 August 2023	Salyut Belgorod (3)	2–0	Avangard Kursk (3)	Belgorod
17:00	Filippov 19'; Dolgalyov 20'	Report		Stadium: Salyut Stadium; Attendance: 350; Referee: Andrey Fisenko

23 August 2023	Kvant Obninsk (4)	0–2	Kaluga (4)	Obninsk
17:00		Report	Kozlov 33'; Sukhanov 69' (pen.)	Stadium: Trud Stadium; Attendance: 411; Referee: Sergey Kolesnik

23 August 2023	Luki-Energiya Velikiye Luki (4)	3–0	Tver (4)	Velikiye Luki
17:00	Zakharov 12', 50'; Kuzmin 88'	Report		Stadium: Ekspress Stadium; Attendance: 490; Referee: Vladislav Bykov

23 August 2023	Dynamo Stavropol (4)	0–0 (5–3 p)	Spartak Nalchik (4)	Stavropol
18:00		Report		Stadium: Dynamo Stadium; Attendance: 600; Referee: Vladislav Shipkov

23 August 2023	Druzhba Maykop (4)	2–0	Kuban-Holding Pavlovskaya (4)	Maykop
18:00	Kadiyev 38'; Antonenko 58'	Report		Stadium: Druzhba Stadium; Attendance: 432; Referee: Roman Marnavsky

23 August 2023	Metallurg Lipetsk (3)	1–1 (4–5 p)	Forte Taganrog (3)	Lipetsk
18:00	Chernyakov 75'	Report	Muromskiy 27'	Stadium: Metallurg Stadium; Attendance: 1,500; Referee: Anton Frolov

23 August 2023	Spartak Tambov (4)	1–3	Dynamo Bryansk (3)	Tambov
18:00	Shulgin 62'	Report	Kanishchev 5'; Faskhutdinov 28'; Medvedev 84'	Stadium: Spartak Stadium; Attendance: 985; Referee: Vladimir Shamara

23 August 2023	Torpedo Vladimir (4)	1–2	Khimik Dzerzhinsk (4)	Vladimir
18:00	Sedov 90+3'	Report	Sutugin 5'; Minayev 82'	Stadium: Torpedo Stadium; Attendance: 656; Referee: Nikita Novikov

23 August 2023	Universitet Ulyanovsk (5)	0–6	Volga Ulyanovsk (3)	Ulyanovsk
18:00 (19:00 SAMT)		Report	Marugin 9'; Alsultanov 16', 30', 65'; Grechkin 61' (o.g.); Dibirgadzhiyev 90+4'	Stadium: Trud Stadium; Attendance: 2090; Referee: Pavel Lysenko

23 August 2023	Peresvet Domodedovo (4)	2–5	Veles Moscow (3)	Domodedovo
19:00	Beskorovayny 7', 51'	Report	Amiraliyev 6'; Sarkisyan 73'; Ivakin 76'; Pesikov 90'; Kabakhidze 90+4'	Stadium: Avangard Stadium; Attendance: 725; Referee: Andrey Zubov

23 August 2023	Znamya Truda Orekhovo-Zuyevo (4)	3–1	Zorkiy Krasnogorsk (4)	Orekhovo-Zuyevo
19:00	Kostyayev 13'; Karepin 75'; Tutayev 84'	Report	Sorokin 74' (pen.)	Stadium: Znamya Truda Stadium; Attendance: 200; Referee: Danik Naboka

23 August 2023	Murom (3)	1–3	2Drots Moscow (7)	Murom
19:00	Zapalatsky 39'	Report	Oslonovsky 7'; Stepanov 36'; Klutsey 83'	Stadium: Losev Stadium; Attendance: 2,080; Referee: Artyom Smolin

23 August 2023	Dynamo Saint Petersburg (4)	2–2 (4–1 p)	Zvezda Saint Petersburg (4)	Saint Petersburg
19:00	Utkin 30'; Kombarov 51' (o.g.)	Report	Ishchenko 41'; Voytsekhovskiy 78'	Stadium: Kirovets Stadium; Attendance: 377; Referee: Yefim Rubtsov

=== Round 3 ===
The draw for round 3 defining home and away team was held on 25 August 2023.

Entered clubs:

- 28 winners of Round 2

Times are MSK (UTC+3), as listed by RFU (local times, if different, are in parentheses).

4 September 2023	Dynamo Kirov (4)	0–2	2Drots Moscow (7)	Belokamenka
14:00		Report	Manayev 40'; Klutsey 64'	Stadium: Floating dock CSKMS; Attendance: 750; Referee: Vitali Meshkov

13 September 2023	Dynamo Vladivostok (4)	0–0 (4–2 p)	Dynamo Barnaul (4)	Vladivostok
12:00 (19:00 VLAT)		Report		Stadium: Dynamo Stadium; Attendance: 1,714; Referee: Aleksey Lapatukhin

13 September 2023	Dynamo Vologda (4)	1–2	Tekstilshchik Ivanovo (3)	Vologda
15:00	Meshalkin 67'	Report	Danilin 21'; Likhachyov 77'	Stadium: Dynamo Stadium; Attendance: 1,718; Referee: Artyom Kataykin

13 September 2023	Biolog-Novokubansk (4)	0–0 (5–3 p)	Dynamo Stavropol (4)	Progress
16:00		Report		Stadium: Biolog Stadium; Attendance: 150; Referee: Igor Kholin

13 September 2023	Khimik Dzerzhinsk (4)	1–1 (5–6 p)	Ryazan (4)	Dzerzhinsk
16:00	Kotelnikov 58'	Report	Kalabukhov 59'	Stadium: Khimik Stadium; Attendance: 600; Referee: Yan Marushko

13 September 2023	Forte Taganrog (3)	1–1 (4–3 p)	Salyut Belgorod (3)	Taganrog
16:30	Mogilev 5'	Report	Maksimchuk 14'	Stadium: Forte Arena; Attendance: 360; Referee: Yaroslav Khromey

13 September 2023	Rotor Volgograd (3)	3–0	Legion Makhachkala (4)	Volgograd
17:00	Arsentyev 53'; Ageyev 67'; Gadzhimuradov 76'	Report		Stadium: Volgograd Arena; Attendance: 5,128; Referee: Yury Matveyev

13 September 2023	Druzhba Maykop (4)	1–1 (3–4 p)	SKA Rostov-on-Don (4)	Maykop
17:00	Delok 83'	Report	Kashtan 30'	Stadium: Druzhba Stadium; Attendance: 454; Referee: Vladislav Shipkov

13 September 2023	Volga Ulyanovsk (3)	0–0 (0–2 p)	Ufa (3)	Ulyanovsk
17:15 (18:15 SAMT)		Report		Stadium: Trud Stadium; Attendance: 1,127; Referee: Ivan Sarayev

13 September 2023	Dynamo Bryansk (3)	0–0 (5–4 p)	Kaluga (4)	Bryansk
18:00		Report		Stadium: Dynamo Stadium; Attendance: 2,320; Referee: Oleg Snegiryov

13 September 2023	Luki-Energiya Velikiye Luki (4)	0–0 (5–4 p)	Dynamo Saint Petersburg (4)	Velikiye Luki
18:30		Report		Stadium: Ekspress Stadium; Attendance: 732; Referee: Igor Vertkov

13 September 2023	Leon Saturn Ramenskoye (4)	0–0 (3–1 p)	Khimik-Avgust Vurnary (4)	Ramenskoye
19:00		Report		Stadium: Saturn Stadium; Attendance: 600; Referee: Sergey Kolesnik

13 September 2023	Veles Moscow (3)	1–1 (1–4 p)	Znamya Truda Orekhovo-Zuyevo (4)	Moscow
19:30	Kobakhidze 59' (pen.)	Report	Akhilgov 28'	Stadium: Avangard Stadium; Attendance: 480; Referee: Igor Zakharov

14 September 2023	Amkar Perm (3)	1–0	Chelyabinsk (3)	Perm
	Matyushenko 22'	Report		Stadium: Zvezda Stadium; Attendance: 2,050; Referee: Yevgeny Galimov

=== Round 4 ===
The draw was held on 15 September 2023 at 12:00 MSK.
Entered clubs:

- 14 winners of Round 3
- 18 clubs from Russian First League

On 12 September draw procedure was released, that consisted of 2 phases. On the first phase 2 random balls with First League team from pot 2 was relocated to pot 1, then on the second phase usual draw procedure started. The teams from pot 1 played their matches in round 4 at home.

Pot 1	Pot 2
2DROTS Moscow (7); Amkar Perm (3); Biolog-Novokubansk (4); Dynamo Bryansk (3); Dynamo Vladivostok (4); Forte Taganrog (3); KAMAZ Naberezhnye Chelny (2); Leon Saturn Ramenskoye (4); Luki-Energiya Velikiye Luki (4); Rotor Volgograd (3); Ryazan (4); SKA Rostov-on-Don (4); SKA-Khabarovsk (2); Tekstilshchik Ivanovo (3); Ufa (3); Znamya Truda Orekhovo-Zuyevo (4)	Akron Tolyatti (2); Alania Vladikavkaz (2); Arsenal Tula (2); Chernomorets Novorossiysk (2); Dynamo Makhachkala (2); KAMAZ Naberezhnye Chelny (2) → Pot 1; Khimki (2); Kuban Krasnodar (2); Leningradets Leningrad Oblast (2); Neftekhimik Nizhnekamsk (2); Rodina Moscow (2); Shinnik Yaroslavl (2); SKA-Khabarovsk (2) → Pot 1; Sokol Saratov (2); Torpedo Moscow (2); Tyumen (2); Volgar Astrakhan (2); Yenisey Krasnoyarsk (2)

The team from pot 2 that was replocated to pot 1 is written in italics. The team was unknown until it will be drawn from pot 1.

Times are MSK (UTC+3), as listed by RFU (local times, if different, are in parentheses).

26 September 2023	Ufa (3)	1–1 (8–7 p)	Torpedo Moscow (2)	Ufa
16:30 (18:30 YEKT)	Troyanov 90+1'	Report	Poloz 69' (pen.)	Stadium: Neftyanik Stadium; Attendance: 1,385; Referee: Koshko Yunus

27 September 2023	Dynamo Vladivostok (4)	2–0	Tyumen (2)	Vladivostok
12:00 (19:00 VLAT)	Bayev 15'; Dorokhov 18'	Report		Stadium: Dynamo Stadium; Attendance: 1,037; Referee: Yaroslav Khromey

27 September 2023	SKA-Khabarovsk (2)	1–1 (4–2 p)	Sokol Saratov (2)	Khabarovsk
12:30 (19:30 VLAT)	Charles 25'	Report	Yezhkov 44'	Stadium: Lenin Stadium; Attendance: 1,243; Referee: Ranel Ziyakov

27 September 2023	Ryazan (4)	1–6	Akron Tolyatti (2)	Kolomna
13:00	Bokoyev 51' (o.g.)	Report	Azarov 25'; Eldurashev 36'; Savichev 45+1'; Pogosov 53'; Ponce 65'; Apekov 75'	Stadium: Trud Stadium; Attendance: 150; Referee: Ivan Sarayev

27 September 2023	Biolog-Novokubansk (4)	1–2	Chernomorets Novorossiysk (2)	Progress
14:00	Korotkov 85'	Report	Panamarev 34' (pen.); Delkin 36'	Stadium: Biolog Stadium; Attendance: 200; Referee: Stanislav Matveyev

27 September 2023	Forte Taganrog (3)	1–0	Dynamo Makhachkala (2)	Taganrog
14:00	Korolkov 43'	Report		Stadium: Forte Arena; Attendance: 771; Referee: German Kovalenko

27 September 2023	Amkar Perm (3)	1–1 (4–2 p)	Kuban Krasnodar (2)	Perm
16:30 (18:30 YEKT)	Martusevich 38' (pen.)	Report	Levin 9'	Stadium: Zvezda Stadium; Attendance: 2,200; Referee: Oleg Sokolov

27 September 2023	SKA Rostov-on-Don (4)	0–3	Neftekhimik Nizhnekamsk (2)	Rostov-on-Don
16:30		Report	Lipovoy 48'; Agalakov 53'; Kakhidze 81' (pen.)	Stadium: SKA Stadium; Attendance: 366; Referee: Andrey Prokopov

27 September 2023	Dynamo Bryansk (3)	1–3	Shinnik Yaroslavl (2)	Bryansk
18:00	Yemelyanov 66' (o.g.)	Report	Osipov 15' (o.g.); Malykhin 51'; Stavpets 82'	Stadium: Dynamo Stadium; Attendance: 3,230; Referee: Maksim Chembulatov

27 September 2023	Znamya Truda Orekhovo-Zuyevo (4)	1–3	Volgar Astrakhan (2)	Orekhovo-Zuyevo
18:00	Tutayev 66'	Report	Shlyakov 25'; Zhamaletdinov 32'; Kosarev 79'	Stadium: Znamya Truda Stadium; Attendance: 2,000; Referee: Aleksey Lapatukhin

27 September 2023	Luki-Energiya Velikiye Luki (4)	1–2	Yenisey Krasnoyarsk (2)	Velikiye Luki
18:30	Shabalin 55'	Report	Okladnikov 58'; Logua 60'	Stadium: Ekspress Stadium; Attendance: 1,477; Referee: Maksim Perezva

27 September 2023	KAMAZ Naberezhnye Chelny (2)	1–0	Leningradets Leningrad Oblast (2)	Naberezhnye Chelny
18:30	Paltsev 84'	Report		Stadium: KAMAZ Stadium; Attendance: 2,055; Referee: Anton Frolov

27 September 2023	Leon Saturn Ramenskoye (4)	1–2	Arsenal Tula (2)	Ramenskoye
19:00	Michurenkov 84'	Report	Barkov 1', 8'	Stadium: Leon Arena; Attendance: 1,400; Referee: Vladimir Shamara

27 September 2023	Rotor Volgograd (3)	1–0	Alania Vladikavkaz (2)	Volgograd
19:00	Akhmedkhanov 70'	Report		Stadium: Volgograd Arena; Attendance: 12,115; Referee: Igor Nizovtsev

27 September 2023	Tekstilshchik Ivanovo (3)	1–3	Rodina Moscow (2)	Ivanovo
19:00	Simdyankin 90+1'	Report	Timoshenko 36'; Turishchev 57', 80'	Stadium: Tekstilshchik Stadium; Attendance: 2,461; Referee: Sergey Kulikov

28 September 2023	2DROTS Moscow (7)	0–2	Khimki (2)	Moscow
16:30		Report	Panchenko 15'; Netfullin 59'	Stadium: Moskvich Stadium; Attendance: 4,002; Referee: Artur Fyodorov

=== Round 5 ===
The draw was held on 29 September 2023 at 13:00 MSK.
Entered clubs:

- 16 winners of Round 4

17 October 2023	SKA-Khabarovsk (2)	2–0	Amkar Perm (3)	Khabarovsk
12:00 (19:00 VLAT)	Aliyev 19', 69'	Report		Stadium: Lenin Stadium; Attendance: 753; Referee: Vladimir Shamara

18 October 2023	Dynamo Vladivostok (4)	1–0	Rotor Volgograd (3)	Vladivostok
12:00 (19:00 VLAT)	Dorokhov 52'	Report		Stadium: Dynamo Stadium; Attendance: 2,647; Referee: Maksim Chembulatov

18 October 2023	Volgar Astrakhan (2)	1–0	Yenisey Krasnoyarsk (2)	Astrakhan
16:00 (17:00 SAMT)	Folmer 83'	Report		Stadium: Central Stadium; Attendance: 1,050; Referee: Vladimir Falov

18 October 2023	Neftekhimik Nizhnekamsk (2)	0–2	Forte Taganrog (3)	Nizhnekamsk
17:00		Report	Rudnev 44'; Shikhbabaev 74'	Stadium: Neftekhimik Stadium; Attendance: 327; Referee: Yuri Matveyev

18 October 2023	Khimki (2)	1–0	Ufa (3)	Khimki
19:00	Khosonov 41' (pen.)	Report		Stadium: Arena Khimki; Attendance: 1,007; Referee: Sergey Tsyganok

18 October 2023	Chernomorets Novorossiysk (2)	0–0 (4–1 p)	KAMAZ Naberezhnye Chelny (2)	Novorossiysk
19:00		Report		Stadium: Central Stadium; Attendance: 5,232; Referee: Yaroslav Khromey
	Penalties
	Maklakov (penalty scored); Khagur (penalty scored); Korobov (penalty scored); Garayev (penalty scored)		(penalty missed) Borisenko; (penalty scored) Ukomsky; (penalty missed) Gorelov

19 October 2023	Akron Tolyatti (2)	3–0	Shinnik Yaroslavl (2)	Zhigulyovsk
16:30 (17:30 SAMT)	Pogosov 8'; Eldarushev 56' (pen.); Ponce 83'	Report		Stadium: Kristall Stadium; Attendance: 489; Referee: Aleksey Lapatukhin

19 October 2023	Arsenal Tula (2)	1–2	Rodina Moscow (2)	Tula
19:00	Barkov 13'	Report	Turishchev 53'; Kalmykov 71'	Stadium: Arsenal Stadium; Attendance: 1,614; Referee: German Kovalenko

=== Round 6 ===
The draw was held on 20 October 2023 at 12:00 MSK.
Entered clubs:

- 8 winners of Round 5

1 November 2023	Forte Taganrog (3)	0–2	SKA-Khabarovsk (2)	Taganrog
14:00		Report	Starodub 7'; Aliyev 90'	Stadium: Forte Arena; Attendance: 1,228; Referee: Maksim Chembulatov

1 November 2023	Rodina Moscow (2)	3–0	Chernomorets Novorossiysk (2)	Moscow
15:00	Kamyshev 26'; Krasilnichenko 45' (o.g.); Kalmykov 50'	Report		Stadium: Spartak Academy Stadium; Attendance: 329; Referee: Yuri Karpov

1 November 2023	Khimki (2)	4–0	Dynamo Vladivostok (4)	Khimki
16:00	Avetisyan 29'; Skvortsov 66'; Kasimov 86', 90+3'	Report		Stadium: Arena Khimki; Attendance: 880; Referee: Roman Safyan

2 November 2023	Akron Tolyatti (2)	0–1	Volgar Astrakhan (2)	Zhigulyovsk
16:00 (17:00 SAMT)		Report	Lesnikov 90+1'	Stadium: Kristall Stadium; Attendance: 602; Referee: Vladimir Seldyakov

== Group stage (RPL path) ==
The draw for group stage was held on 24 June 2023 live on TV-channel «Match TV».

16 teams of the Russian Premier League (RPL) will start the tournament from the group stage (4 teams in each group). The teams will play 6 matches in the group stage:

- 1st day — 25–27 July;
- 2nd day — 8–10 August;
- 3rd day — 29–30 August;
- 4th day — 19–21 September;
- 5th day — 3–5 October;
- 6th day — 31 October – 2 November.

Pot 1	Pot 2	Pot 3	Pot 4
Zenit Saint Petersburg; CSKA Moscow; Spartak Moscow; Rostov	Akhmat Grozny; Krasnodar; Orenburg; Lokomotiv Moscow	Dynamo Moscow; Sochi; Ural Yekaterinburg; Krylia Sovetov Samara	Pari Nizhny Novgorod; Fakel Voronezh; Rubin Kazan; Baltika Kaliningrad

Composition of the pots is based on results of the 2022–23 Russian Premier League and 2022–23 Russian First League. In the same group there can't be more than 2 teams from Moscow, also FC Krasnodar, FC Rostov and Fakel Voronezh can't be in the same group due to logistics restrictions in this cities.

Times are MSK (UTC+3), as listed by RFU (local times, if different, are in parentheses).

=== Group A ===
Pos	Team	Pld	W	PW	PL	L	GF	GA	GD	Pts	Qualification	CSK	ORE	SOC	FAK
1	CSKA Moscow	6	2	2	1	1	11	5	+6	11 (Note: Head-to-head points: CSKA 6, Orenburg 0.)	Qualification to the Knockout phase (RPL path)	—	3–1	1–1 (Note: CSKA won 4–2 on penalties.)	0–2
2	Orenburg	6	3	1	0	2	6	10	−4	11	Qualification to the Knockout phase (RPL path)	0–6	—	2–0	0–0 (Note: Orenburg won 4–2 on penalties.)
3	Sochi	6	2	0	2	2	7	6	+1	8	Qualification to the Knockout phase (regions path)	0–0 (Note: CSKA won 4–5 on penalties.)	1–2	—	2–0
4	Fakel Voronezh	6	1	1	1	3	4	7	−3	6		1–1 (Note: Fakel won 4–2 on penalties.)	0–1	1–3	—

Source: Russian Football Union (in Russian), Soccerway
Rules for classification: 1) Points; 2) Head-to-head points; 3) Head-to-head matches won; 4) Head-to-head goal difference; 5) Head-to-head goals scored; 6) Matches won; 7) Goal difference; 8) Goals scored; 9) Penalty shoot-out goal difference; 10) Draw.
Notes:

26 July 2023 Matchday 1	Orenburg	0–6	CSKA Moscow	Orenburg
16:15 (18:15 YEKT)	Kenyaykin (red card) 14'; Sivakov (yellow card) 56' (yellow-red card) 62'	Report	Arbuzov 12'; Zaynutdinov 18'; Gajić 22'; Chalov 45+1'; Lukin (yellow card) 53'; Kislyak (yellow card) 66' (goal) 87'; Yermakov 89'	Stadium: Gazovik Stadium; Attendance: 4,572; Referee: Pavel Kukuyan

26 July 2023 Matchday 1	Fakel Voronezh	1–3	Sochi	Voronezh
18:30	Cherov 28'; Masternoy (yellow card) 30'; Appayev (yellow card) 55'; Kudryashov (red card) 68'; Markov (yellow card) 90'	Report	Silveira 21'; Burmistrov (yellow card) 37'; Batyrev (yellow card) 43'; Kravtsov 45+3' (yellow card) 85'; Zaika 78'; Medveděv (yellow card) 87'	Stadium: Tsentralnyi Profsoyuz Stadion; Attendance: 13,507; Referee: Sergey Cheban

9 August 2023 Matchday 2	Orenburg	2–0	Sochi	Orenburg
16:15 (18:15 YEKT)	Florentín 12'; Oganesyan 25'; Muro (yellow card) 50'	Report	Shipunov (yellow card) 39'; Kravtsov (yellow card) 81'	Stadium: Gazovik Stadium; Attendance: 2,223; Referee: Evgeny Turbin

9 August 2023 Matchday 2	CSKA Moscow	0–2	Fakel Voronezh	Moscow
18:30	Rocha (yellow card) 87'; Moisés (yellow card) 90+2'	Report	Maksimov 15', 79'; Ivakhnov (yellow card) 47'; Motpan (yellow card) 84'; Alshin (yellow card) 90+2'	Stadium: VEB Arena; Attendance: 6,910; Referee: Roman Galimov

29 August 2023 Matchday 3	Fakel Voronezh	0–1	Orenburg	Voronezh
17:15	Bagamayev (yellow card) 42'; Ivlev (yellow card) 85'; Cele (yellow card) 87'	Report	Pérez (yellow card) 10'; Poluyakhtov (yellow card) 80'; Gojković (yellow card) 88'; Obukhov 90+1'	Stadium: Tsentralnyi Profsoyuz Stadion; Attendance: 11,017; Referee: Roman Galimov

30 August 2023 Matchday 3	Sochi	0–0 (4–5 p)	CSKA Moscow	Sochi
17:15		Report	Gajić (yellow card) 50'; Méndez (yellow card) 54'; Nababkin (yellow card) 77'	Stadium: Fisht Olympic Stadium; Attendance: 6,333; Referee: Rafael Shafeyev
	Penalties
	Yusupov (penalty scored); Ignatyev (penalty missed); Alves (penalty scored); Batyrev (penalty scored); Kramarič (penalty scored); Yurganov (penalty missed); Medvedev (penalty missed)		(penalty missed) Chalov; (penalty scored) Zabolotny; (penalty scored) Kislyak; (penalty scored) Nababkin; (penalty scored) Oblyakov; (penalty missed) Méndez; (penalty scored) Gajić

20 September 2023 Matchday 4	CSKA Moscow	1–1 (4–2 p)	Sochi	Moscow
15:00	Oblyakov 78'	Report	Noboa 43'; Angban (yellow card) 86'	Stadium: VEB Arena; Attendance: 9,390; Referee: Sergey Tsyganok
	Penalties
	Chalov (penalty missed); Zabolotny (penalty scored); Dávila (penalty scored); Fayzullaev (penalty scored); Oblyakov (penalty scored)		(penalty missed) Makarchuk; (penalty scored) Silveira; (penalty scored) Margasov; (penalty missed) Batyrev

21 September 2023 Matchday 4	Orenburg	0–0 (4–2 p)	Fakel Voronezh	Orenburg
17:15 (19:15 YEKT)	Khotulyov (yellow card) 57'; Kaplenko (yellow card) 75'	Report	Jakoliš (yellow card) 32'; Poyarkov (yellow card) 54'	Stadium: Gazovik Stadium; Attendance: 3,320; Referee: Yan Bobrovski
	Penalties
	Vera (penalty scored); Gojković (penalty scored); Marín (penalty scored); Goglichidze (penalty scored)		(penalty missed) Dolgov; (penalty scored) Cherov; (penalty scored) Yakimov; (penalty missed) Maksimov

4 October 2023 Matchday 5	Fakel Voronezh	1–1 (4–2 p)	CSKA Moscow	Voronezh
14:30	Bagamayev (yellow card) 64'; Magal 80'	Report	Gajić 88'	Stadium: Tsentralnyi Profsoyuz Stadion; Attendance: 13,054; Referee: Aleksey Amelin
	Penalties
	Markov (penalty scored); Cele (penalty scored); Yakimov (penalty scored); Suslov (penalty scored)		(penalty scored) Chalov; (penalty missed) Fayzullaev; (penalty scored) Oblyakov; (penalty missed) Zabolotny

4 October 2023 Matchday 5	Sochi	1–2	Orenburg	Sochi
15:00	Meshchaninov 17'; Angban (yellow card) 60'; Litvinov (yellow card) 66'; Anosov (yellow card) 90+7'	Report	Obukhov 27' (pen.); Marín 64'; Sivakow (red card) 89'	Stadium: Fisht Olympic Stadium; Attendance: 1,681; Referee: Pavel Shadykhanov

1 November 2023 Matchday 6	Sochi	2–0	Fakel Voronezh	Sochi
18:30	Burmistrov 29'; Margasov 42' (yellow card) 83'; Litvinov (yellow card) 73'; Yurganov (yellow card) 90+3'	Report	Ivlev (yellow card) 18'; Mendel (yellow card) 51'; Bozhin (yellow card) 59'	Stadium: Fisht Olympic Stadium; Attendance: 6,757; Referee: Yevgeni Kukulyak

2 November 2023 Matchday 6	CSKA Moscow	3–1	Orenburg	Moscow
18:30	Khellven (yellow card) 27'; Chalov 35' (pen.), 74'; Zabolotny 42'	Report	Gürlük 37'	Stadium: VEB Arena; Attendance: 10,764; Referee: Ivan Abrosimov

=== Group B ===
Pos	Team	Pld	W	PW	PL	L	GF	GA	GD	Pts	Qualification	LOK	ROS	URA	RUB
1	Lokomotiv Moscow	6	4	0	1	1	10	4	+6	13	Qualification to the Knockout phase (RPL path)	—	3–1	2–1	3–0
2	Rostov	6	3	1	0	2	7	7	0	11	Qualification to the Knockout phase (RPL path)	2–1	—	2–1	1–0
3	Ural Yekaterinburg	6	2	1	0	3	6	6	0	8	Qualification to the Knockout phase (regions path)	0–0 (Note: Ural won 4–2 on penalties.)	1–0	—	2–0
4	Rubin Kazan	6	1	0	1	4	3	9	−6	4		0–1	1–1 (Note: Rostov won 2–4 on penalties.)	2–1	—

Source: Russian Football Union (in Russian), Soccerway
Rules for classification: 1) Points; 2) Head-to-head points; 3) Head-to-head matches won; 4) Head-to-head goal difference; 5) Head-to-head goals scored; 6) Matches won; 7) Goal difference; 8) Goals scored; 9) Penalty shoot-out goal difference; 10) Draw.
Notes:

25 July 2023 Matchday 1	Lokomotiv Moscow	2–1	Ural Yekaterinburg	Moscow
18:30	Isidor 35'; Tiknizyan 49'; Barinov (yellow card) 83'; Glushenkov (yellow card) 83'	Report	Ayupov 8' (yellow card) 54'; Mamin (yellow card) 80'	Stadium: RZD Arena; Attendance: 7,820; Referee: Artur Fyodorov

26 July 2023 Matchday 1	Rostov	1–0	Rubin Kazan	Rostov-on-Don
20:45	Shchetinin (yellow card) 28'; Mironov (yellow card) 50'; Komarov 59'; Melyokhin (yellow card) 90+4'	Report	Bezrukov (yellow card) 38'	Stadium: Rostov Arena; Attendance: 10,429; Referee: Yevgeniy Bulanov

8 August 2023 Matchday 2	Ural Yekaterinburg	1–0	Rostov	Yekaterinburg
16:15 (18:15 YEKT)	Beveyev (yellow card) 32'; Yushin 41'	Report	Sukhomlinov (yellow card) 37'; Terentyev (yellow card) 78'	Stadium: Yekaterinburg Arena; Attendance: 10,359; Referee: Roman Safyan

8 August 2023 Matchday 2	Rubin Kazan	0–1	Lokomotiv Moscow	Kazan
18:30	Lisakovich (yellow card) 29'; Vujačić (yellow card) 45+1'; Rakhmonaliev (yellow card) 48'; Teslenko (yellow card) 73'; Ashurmatov (yellow card) 85'	Report	Miranchuk (yellow card) 10'; Samoshnikov (yellow card) 17'; Barinov (yellow card) 54'; Sarveli 63'	Stadium: Ak Bars Arena; Attendance: 9,243; Referee: Vladimir Moskalev

29 August 2023 Matchday 3	Rubin Kazan	2–1	Ural Yekaterinburg	Kazan
15:00	Ashurmatov 10' (yellow card) 85'; Teslenko 30' (yellow card) 51'; Lisakovich (yellow card) 41'; Shiryayev (yellow card) 90+2'	Report	Mamin (yellow card) 29'; Kashtanov 35'; Beveyev (yellow card) 90+5'	Stadium: Ak Bars Arena; Attendance: 4,112; Referee: Yan Bobrovsky

30 August 2023 Matchday 3	Rostov	2–1	Lokomotiv Moscow	Rostov-on-Don
19:30	Prokhin (yellow card) 12'; Golenkov 24' (yellow card) 52'; Vakhaniya 37'; Sukhomlinov (yellow card) 40'; Utkin (yellow card) 57'; Glebov (yellow card) 83'	Report	Kuzmichyov (yellow card) 4'; Glushenkov 71'	Stadium: Rostov Arena; Attendance: 15,525; Referee: Vladislav Bezborodov

20 September 2023 Matchday 4	Ural Yekaterinburg	0–0 (4–2 p)	Lokomotiv Moscow	Yekaterinburg
15:00 (17:00 YEKT)		Report	Nenakhov (yellow card) 77'; Morozov (yellow card) 85'	Stadium: Yekaterinburg Arena; Attendance: 11,722; Referee: Sergey Karasyov
	Penalties
	Schettine (penalty scored); Bicfalvi (penalty scored); Miškić (penalty scored); Sungatulin (penalty scored)		(penalty missed) Mitaj; (penalty scored) Glushenkov; (penalty missed) Zhemaletdinov; (penalty scored) Silyanov

20 September 2023 Matchday 4	Rubin Kazan	1–1 (2–4 p)	Rostov	Kazan
17:15	Drezgić (yellow card) 45'; Apshatsev 49'	Report	Ignatov 26' (yellow card) 89'; Langovich (yellow card) 71'; Melyokhin (yellow card) 86'	Stadium: Ak Bars Arena; Attendance: 6,040; Referee: Sergey Cheban
	Penalties
	Rakhmonaliev (penalty missed); Vujačić (penalty scored); Konovalov (penalty scored); Drezgić (penalty missed)		(penalty scored) Tugarev; (penalty scored) Golenkov; (penalty scored) Shchetinin; (penalty scored) Ignatov

3 October 2023 Matchday 5	Ural Yekaterinburg	2–0	Rubin Kazan	Yekaterinburg
15:00 (17:00 YEKT)	Filipenko (yellow card) 25'; Yegorychev 40'; Bicfalvi 56'	Report	Fameyeh (yellow card) 45+1'; Apshatsev (yellow card) 70'	Stadium: Yekaterinburg Arena; Attendance: 7,371; Referee: Evgeny Turbin

3 October 2023 Matchday 5	Lokomotiv Moscow	3–1	Rostov	Moscow
17:15	Suleymanov 34'; Morozov (yellow card) 36'; Miranchuk 39'; Glushenkov 59'; Zhemaletdinov (yellow card) 89'; Barinov (yellow card) 90+3'	Report	Prohkin (yellow card) 46'; Osipenko (yellow card) 64' (goal) 89'	Stadium: RZD Arena; Attendance: 7,175; Referee: Artyom Lyubimov

1 November 2023 Matchday 6	Lokomotiv Moscow	3–0	Rubin Kazan	Moscow
18:30	Tiknizyan 9'; Miranchuk 26' (yellow card) 45'; Sarveli 37' (yellow card) 61'; Kulikov (yellow card) 40'	Report	Fameyeh (yellow card) 22'	Stadium: RZD Arena; Attendance: 8,166; Referee: Vera Opeykina

2 November 2023 Matchday 6	Rostov	2–1	Ural Yekaterinburg	Rostov-on-Don
20:45	Komarov (yellow card) 24'; Melyokhin 45'; Komlichenko 67'; Utkin (yellow card) 86'; Medvedev (yellow card) 90+2'	Report	Filipenko (yellow card) 8' (yellow-red card) 84'; Ayupov (yellow card) 47'; Schettine 50'; Sungatulin (yellow card) 59'; Yegorychev (yellow card) 72'	Stadium: Rostov Arena; Attendance: 10,647; Referee: Rafael Shafeyev

=== Group C ===
Pos	Team	Pld	W	PW	PL	L	GF	GA	GD	Pts	Qualification	ZEN	BAL	AKH	KRY
1	Zenit Saint Petersburg	6	4	1	0	1	9	5	+4	14	Qualification to the Knockout phase (RPL path)	—	2–1	2–0	1–0
2	Baltika Kaliningrad	6	4	0	0	2	12	7	+5	12	Qualification to the Knockout phase (RPL path)	1–0	—	4–1	1–2
3	Akhmat Grozny	6	2	0	1	3	10	12	−2	7	Qualification to the Knockout phase (regions path)	3–3 (Note: Zenit won 2–4 on penalties.)	0–2	—	3–1
4	Krylia Sovetov Samara	6	1	0	0	5	5	12	−7	3		0–1	2–3	0–3	—

Source: Russian Football Union (in Russian), Soccerway
Rules for classification: 1) Points; 2) Head-to-head points; 3) Head-to-head matches won; 4) Head-to-head goal difference; 5) Head-to-head goals scored; 6) Matches won; 7) Goal difference; 8) Goals scored; 9) Penalty shoot-out goal difference; 10) Draw.
Notes:

25 July 2023 Matchday 1	Zenit Saint Petersburg	2–0	Akhmat Grozny	Saint Petersburg
20:45	Mantuan 39'; Queiroz (yellow card) 59'; Claudinho 80'; Vasilyev (yellow card) 89'	Report	Todorović (yellow card) 30'	Stadium: Gazprom Arena; Attendance: 29,664; Referee: Sergey Tsyganok

26 July 2023 Matchday 1	Krylia Sovetov Samara	2–3	Baltika Kaliningrad	Samara
18:30 (19:30 SAMT)	Khubulov 10'; Bijl 89'	Report	Ostojić (yellow card) 7'; Fernández 56'; Henríquez 67'; Kuzmin 74'	Stadium: Solidarnost Samara Arena; Attendance: 8,021; Referee: Roman Safyan

9 August 2023 Matchday 2	Krylia Sovetov Samara	0–1	Zenit Saint Petersburg	Samara
18:30 (19:30 SAMT)		Report	Sergeev 50'; Queiroz (yellow card) 90+6'	Stadium: Solidarnost Samara Arena; Attendance: 18,617; Referee: Sergey Cheban

10 August 2023 Matchday 2	Akhmat Grozny	0–2	Baltika Kaliningrad	Grozny
20:00	Timofeyev (yellow card) 65'	Report	Semyonov 44' (o.g.); Lameira (yellow card) 52'; Barkov 63'; Osipov (yellow card) 83'	Stadium: Akhmat Arena; Attendance: 3,567; Referee: Artur Fyodorov

30 August 2023 Matchday 3	Akhmat Grozny	3–1	Krylia Sovetov Samara	Grozny
17:15	Konaté 44'; Čeliković 53' (yellow card) 90'; Berisha (yellow card) 80'; Oleynikov 90+4'	Report	Bijl 51'; Yevgenyev (yellow card) 63'	Stadium: Akhmat Arena; Attendance: 6,231; Referee: Pavel Shadykhanov

30 August 2023 Matchday 3	Baltika Kaliningrad	1–0	Zenit Saint Petersburg	Kaliningrad
19:30 (18:30 KALT)	Henríquez 42'; Latyshonok (yellow card) 84'; Guzina (yellow card) 90+4'	Report	Wendel (yellow card) 90+3'; Claudinho (yellow card) 90+4'	Stadium: Rostec Arena; Attendance: 27,961; Referee: Sergey Tsyganok

19 September 2023 Matchday 4	Baltika Kaliningrad	1–2	Krylia Sovetov Samara	Kaliningrad
17:15 (16:15 KALT)	Galoyan 90+1' (pen.)	Report	Soldatenkov (yellow card) 3'; Pisarsky 38'; Bijl (yellow card) 40+1'; Rahmanović 55'; Saltykov (yellow card) 75'	Stadium: Rostec Arena; Attendance: 6,983; Referee: Vera Opeykina

20 September 2023 Matchday 4	Akhmat Grozny	3–3 (2–4 p)	Zenit Saint Petersburg	Grozny
17:15	Kovachev 4'; Oleynikov 14'; Utsiyev (yellow card) 51'; Ilyin 69'; Bystrov (red card) 90+2'	Report	Sergeyev 27', 33'; Cassierra 42'; Krugovoy (yellow card) 90+4'	Stadium: Akhmat Arena; Attendance: 13,383; Referee: Roman Galimov
	Penalties
	Ilyin (penalty missed); Todorović (penalty scored); Kharin (penalty scored); Júnior (penalty missed)		(penalty scored) Cassierra; (penalty scored) Isidor; (penalty missed) Queiroz; (penalty scored) Renan; (penalty scored) Claudinho

3 October 2023 Matchday 5	Zenit Saint Petersburg	2–1	Baltika Kaliningrad	Saint Petersburg
17:15	Sergeyev 18'; Queiroz 64'	Report	Bistrović 24'; Musayev (yellow card) 90+2'	Stadium: Gazprom Arena; Attendance: 13,700; Referee: Aleksey Sukhoy

4 October 2023 Matchday 5	Krylia Sovetov Samara	0–3	Akhmat Grozny	Samara
12:30 (13:30 SAMT)	Zotov (yellow card) 21'; Yezhov (yellow card) 24'	Report	Ilyin 2'; Konaté 8'; Júnior (yellow card) 27'; Semyonov 66'	Stadium: Solidarnost Samara Arena; Attendance: 8,032; Referee: Yevgeni Kukulyak

31 October 2023 Matchday 6	Zenit Saint Petersburg	1–0	Krylia Sovetov Samara	Saint Petersburg
19:30	Renan (yellow card) 4'; Sergeyev 87'	Report		Stadium: Gazprom Arena; Attendance: 24,519; Referee: Pavel Kukuyan

31 October 2023 Matchday 6	Baltika Kaliningrad	4–1	Akhmat Grozny	Kaliningrad
20:30 (19:30 KALT)	Henríquez 45'; Musayev 48', 79'; Gassama (yellow card) 60'; Fernández (yellow card) 69'; Guzina 90+3'	Report	Shvets 33'; Kamilov (yellow card) 49'; Agalarov (yellow card) 60'; Volkov (yellow card) 60'	Stadium: Rostec Arena; Attendance: 7,112; Referee: Artyom Lyubimov

=== Group D ===
Pos	Team	Pld	W	PW	PL	L	GF	GA	GD	Pts	Qualification	SPA	DYN	KRA	PNN
1	Spartak Moscow	6	4	0	0	2	16	12	+4	12	Qualification to the Knockout phase (RPL path)	—	4–1	2–3	5–4
2	Dynamo Moscow	6	3	0	2	1	12	10	+2	11 (Note: Head-to-head points: Dynamo 4, Krasnodar 2.)	Qualification to the Knockout phase (RPL path)	3–0	—	4–3	2–1
3	Krasnodar	6	3	1	0	2	12	9	+3	11	Qualification to the Knockout phase (regions path)	1–2	1–1 (Note: Krasnodar won 4–2 on penalties.)	—	3–0
4	Pari Nizhny Novgorod	6	0	1	0	5	6	15	−9	2		0–3	1–1 (Note: Pari Nizhny Novgorod won 4–3 on penalties.)	0–1	—

Source: Russian Football Union (in Russian), Soccerway
Rules for classification: 1) Points; 2) Head-to-head points; 3) Head-to-head matches won; 4) Head-to-head goal difference; 5) Head-to-head goals scored; 6) Matches won; 7) Goal difference; 8) Goals scored; 9) Penalty shoot-out goal difference; 10) Draw.
Notes:

25 July 2023 Matchday 1	Pari Nizhny Novgorod	1–1 (4–3 p)	Dynamo Moscow	Nizhny Novgorod
18:30	Sevikyan 8'; Aleksandrov (yellow card) 56'; Tikhiy (yellow card) 57'	Report	Gladyshev 9'; Bessmertny (yellow card) 70'	Stadium: Nizhny Novgorod Stadium; Attendance: 9,486; Referee: Roman Galimov
	Penalties
	Aleksandrov (penalty scored); Suleymanov (penalty scored); Zhigulyov (penalty scored); Yuldoshev (penalty scored)		(penalty scored) Tyukavin; (penalty missed) Makarov; (penalty scored) Zakharyan; (penalty scored) Karapuzov; (penalty missed) Parshivlyuk

27 July 2023 Matchday 1	Krasnodar	1–2	Spartak Moscow	Krasnodar
20:00	Spertsyan (red card) 44'; Córdoba (yellow card) 45+2'; Arutyunyan (yellow card) 88'; Borges (yellow card) 90' (goal) 90+5'	Report	Zobnin 21'; Ignatov (yellow card) 47'; Bogonda 67'; Klassen (yellow card) 79'	Stadium: Krasnodar Stadium; Attendance: 31,733; Referee: Aleksey Sukhoy

8 August 2023 Matchday 2	Spartak Moscow	5–4	Pari Nizhny Novgorod	Moscow
20:45	Klassen 9' (yellow card) 44'; Prutsev 15'; Melyoshin 36'; Duarte (yellow card) 61'; Ignatov 80'; Promes 89'; Reabciuk (yellow card) 90'	Report	Suleymanov (yellow card) 21' (goal) 29', 56' (pen.); Sevikyan 46'; Aleksandrov 50'; Botnar (yellow card) 68'; Jiyanov (yellow card) 80'	Stadium: Otkritie Bank Arena; Attendance: 13,323; Referee: Sergey Tsyganok

9 August 2023 Matchday 2	Dynamo Moscow	4–3	Krasnodar	Moscow
20:45	Fomin 31' (pen.) (yellow card) 88'; Grulyov 35', 67'; Fernández (yellow card) 79'; Ngamaleu (yellow card) 82'; Zakharyan 90+6'	Report	Agkatsev (yellow card) 30'; Krivtsov 41'; Cobnan 47'; Córdoba 77' (pen.)	Stadium: VTB Arena; Attendance: 14,259; Referee: Yevgeniy Bulanov

29 August 2023 Matchday 3	Spartak Moscow	4–1	Dynamo Moscow	Moscow
19:30	Sobolev 6', 18'; Babić 15'; Zinkovsky 24'; Medina (yellow card) 68'; Reabciuk (yellow card) 76'	Report	Parshivlyuk (yellow card) 14'; Lesovoy (yellow card) 45+1'; Ngamaleu 65'; Carrascal (yellow card) 80'; Laxalt (yellow card) 86'; Gagnidze (yellow card) 90+3'	Stadium: Otkritie Bank Arena; Attendance: 19,208; Referee: Vitaly Meshkov

29 August 2023 Matchday 3	Pari Nizhny Novgorod	0–1	Krasnodar	Nizhny Novgorod
19:30	Karapuzov (yellow card) 35'; Maiga (yellow card) 53'	Report	Banjac (yellow card) 58'; Córdoba 88'	Stadium: Nizhny Novgorod Stadium; Attendance: 12,381; Referee: Artur Fyodorov

19 September 2023 Matchday 4	Krasnodar	1–1 (4–2 p)	Dynamo Moscow	Krasnodar
15:00	Pina (yellow card) 61'; Borges 69'; Akhmetov (yellow card) 76'	Report	Carrascal (yellow card) 3'; Bitello 21'; Laxalt (yellow card) 72'; Balbuena (yellow card) 90+5'	Stadium: Krasnodar Stadium; Attendance: 14,455; Referee: Roman Safyan
	Penalties
	Borges (penalty scored); Koksharov (penalty scored); Chernikov (penalty scored); Batxi (penalty missed); Pina (penalty scored)		(penalty missed) Tyukavin; (penalty missed) Smolov; (penalty scored) Ngamaleu; (penalty scored) Balbuena

19 September 2023 Matchday 4	Pari Nizhny Novgorod	0–3	Spartak Moscow	Nizhny Novgorod
17:15	Stotsky (yellow card) 23'; Gotsuk (yellow card) 90'; Karapuzov (yellow card) 90+5'	Report	Klassen 27'; Prutsev (yellow card) 44'; Dzhikiya (yellow card) 45+2'; Denisov (yellow card) 81'; Martins 90+1'; Promes (yellow card) 90+5' (goal) 90+6'	Stadium: Nizhny Novgorod Stadium; Attendance: 32,189; Referee: Yevgeny Bulanov

4 October 2023 Matchday 5	Dynamo Moscow	3–0	Spartak Moscow	Moscow
16:45	Marichal (yellow card) 31'; Bitello 43'; Fomin 45'; Zazvonkin 90+5'	Report	Maslov (yellow card) 30'; Prutsev (yellow card) 48'; Chernov (yellow card) 71'	Stadium: VTB Arena; Attendance: 18,205; Referee: Vladimir Moskalyov

4 October 2023 Matchday 5	Krasnodar	3–0	Pari Nizhny Novgorod	Krasnodar
17:15	Akhmetov 33'; Arutyunyan 63'; Córdoba 90+7'	Report	Aleksandrov (yellow card) 22'; Kakkoyev (yellow card) 47'	Stadium: Krasnodar Stadium; Attendance: 11,128; Referee: Vasili Kazartsev

1 November 2023 Matchday 6	Spartak Moscow	2–3	Krasnodar	Moscow
20:45	Sobolev 8' (pen.) (yellow card) 86'; Umyarov 45+1'; Klassen (yellow card) 72'	Report	Koksharov 3', 61' (yellow card) 90+6'; Krivtsov (yellow card) 19'; Denisov 74' (o.g.); Agkatsev (yellow card) 83'; Banjac (yellow card) 90+8'	Stadium: Otkritie Bank Arena; Attendance: 11,280; Referee: Yevgeni Bulanov

2 November 2023 Matchday 6	Dynamo Moscow	2–1	Pari Nizhny Novgorod	Moscow
20:45	Tyukavin 16'; Gladyshev 90+3'	Report	Sevikyan 13'; Boselli (yellow card) 85'; Gotsuk (yellow card) 90'	Stadium: VTB Arena; Attendance: 10,147; Referee: Ranel Ziyakov

== Knockout phase ==
In the knockout phase, as in the qualification, the teams will be divided into 2 paths (brackets).

The teams in RPL path (upper bracket) will play against each other over two legs on a home-and-away basis. The teams that will lose after 2 legs in RPL path, except for the path final, will have the second chance in the regions path.

The teams in the regions path (lower bracket) will play against each other in 1 match. Each round, except the path final, consists of 2 phases. In the quarter-finals first phase teams from the regions path qualification will play against the third placed team of RPL path group stage, then on the second stage they will play against RPL path quarter-finals loser. In the semi-finals first phase the teams play with winners of the previous round of the regions path, the second phase is the same as in quarter-finals.

Unlike the previous season, the team that loses in the final of the upper bracket is eliminated from the tournament and will not play in the final of the lower bracket, so the final of Regions path consists of only 1 stage.

The winners of both paths will play in super final.

RPL path Quarter-finals	RPL path Semi-finals	RPL path Final	Final
Baltika Kaliningrad (p)	2	1	3 (7)
Lokomotiv Moscow	2	1	3 (6)
Baltika Kaliningrad	0	0	0
CSKA Moscow	1	2	3
Rostov	1	0	1
CSKA Moscow	1	2	3
CSKA Moscow	1	0	1 (4)
Zenit Saint Petersburg (p)	1	0	1 (5)
Orenburg	1	1	2
Spartak Moscow	0	3	3
Spartak Moscow	1	0	1
Zenit Saint Petersburg	2	0	2
Dynamo Moscow	1	0	1
2 June 2024 – Moscow
Zenit Saint Petersburg	0	2	2
Zenit Saint Petersburg	2
Baltika Kaliningrad	1
Regions path Quarter-finals; Stage 1	Regions path Quarter-finals; Stage 2	Regions path Semi-finals; Stage 1	Regions path Semi-finals; Stage 2	Regions path Final
Ural Yekaterinburg	1
Rostov	0
Rodina Moscow	1 (1)	Lokomotiv Moscow	0
Ural Yekaterinburg	1	Baltika Kaliningrad	1
Ural Yekaterinburg (p)	1 (4)
Rostov	3
Khimki	0 (6)
Baltika Kaliningrad	1
Khimki	2	Rostov (p)	0 (7)
Spartak Moscow	0
Krasnodar	0
Akhmat Grozny	0
Dynamo Moscow	0
Volgar Astrakhan	1	Orenburg	1
Orenburg	2	Spartak Moscow	2
Akhmat Grozny	2
Dynamo Moscow	4
SKA-Khabarovsk	1
SKA-Khabarovsk (p)	1 (4)	Dynamo Moscow	2
Sochi	1 (2)

=== Quarter-finals ===
The draw was held on 3 November 2023 at 12:00 MSK live on TV-channel «Match TV».

In the quarter-final matches of RPL path teams from same group can't play with each other. Runners-up of group stage will play first matches at home. Winners of regions path round 6 will play stage 1 matches of regions path at home as well.

RPL path
Pot 1	Pot 2
CSKA Moscow (1); Lokomotiv Moscow (1); Spartak Moscow (1); Zenit Saint Petersburg (1)	Baltika Kaliningrad (1); Dynamo Moscow (1); Orenburg (1); Rostov (1)

Regions path
Pot 1	Pot 2
SKA-Khabarovsk (2); Rodina Moscow (2); Khimki (2); Volgar Astrakhan (2)	Akhmat Grozny (1); Krasnodar (1); Sochi (1); Ural Yekaterinburg (1)

Times are MSK (UTC+3), as listed by RFU (local times, if different, are in parentheses).

==== RPL path ====
Team 1	Agg.	Team 2	1st leg	2nd leg
Orenburg	2–3	Spartak Moscow	1–0	1–3
Rostov	1–3	CSKA Moscow	1–1	0–2
Baltika Kaliningrad	3–3 (7–6 p)	Lokomotiv Moscow	2–2	1–1
Dynamo Moscow	1–2	Zenit Saint Petersburg	1–0	0–2

29 November 2023 RPL QF	Orenburg	1–0	Spartak Moscow	Orenburg
16:00 (18:00 YEKT)	Titkov 11' (pen.) (yellow card) 33'; Oganesyan (yellow card) 55'	Report	Reabciuk (red card) 40'; Medina (yellow card) 90+1'	Stadium: Gazovik Stadium; Attendance: 5,438; Referee: Aleksey Sukhoy

14 March 2024 RPL QF	Spartak Moscow	3–1	Orenburg	Moscow
18:00	Sobolev 36'; Zinkovsky 64'; Babić 68'; Selikhov (yellow card) 90'	Report	Ghorbani 10' (yellow card) 20'; Gojković (yellow card) 14'; Poluyakhtov (yellow card) 45+1' (yellow-red card) 84'	Stadium: Lukoil Arena; Attendance: 10,321; Referee: Vladislav Bezborodov

29 November 2023 RPL QF	Rostov	1–1	CSKA Moscow	Rostov-on-Don
18:15	Nababkin 8' (o.g.); Prokhin (yellow card) 14'	Report	Dávila (yellow card) 27'; Zabolotny 33'; Moisés (red card) 77'	Stadium: Rostov Arena; Attendance: 11,059; Referee: Kirill Levnikov

12 March 2024 RPL QF	CSKA Moscow	2–0	Rostov	Moscow
20:15	Agapov 63'; Khellven (yellow card) 79'; Musayev 84'	Report	Komarov (yellow card) 90'; Mohebi (yellow card) 90+6'	Stadium: VEB Arena; Attendance: 10,969; Referee: Sergei Karasev

28 November 2023 RPL QF	Baltika Kaliningrad	2–2	Lokomotiv Moscow	Kaliningrad
18:15 (17:15 KALT)	Malyarov (yellow card) 49'; Avanesyan 65'; Gassama 70'; Musayev (yellow card) 83'	Report	Suleymanov 16', 90+3'; Nenakhov (yellow card) 78'	Stadium: Rostec Arena; Attendance: 5,702; Referee: Sergey Cheban

14 March 2024 RPL QF	Lokomotiv Moscow	1–1 (6–7 p)	Baltika Kaliningrad	Moscow
18:00	Tiknizyan 3'; Nyamsi (yellow card) 59'; Samoshnikov (yellow card) 66'; Morozov (yellow card) 83'	Report	Kozlov 52'; Luna (yellow card) 90+1'	Stadium: RZD Arena; Attendance: 8,350; Referee: Artyom Chistyakov
	Penalties
	Miranchuk (penalty scored); Suleymanov (penalty scored); Barinov (penalty scored); Nenakhov (penalty scored); Dzyuba (penalty missed); Nyamsi (penalty scored); Morozov (penalty scored); Pinyayev (penalty missed)		Zhirov (penalty scored); Kaplenko (penalty missed); Bistrović (penalty scored); Kuzmin (penalty scored); Fameyeh (penalty scored); Andrade (penalty scored); Kozlov (penalty scored); Luna (penalty scored)

29 November 2023 RPL QF	Dynamo Moscow	1–0	Zenit Saint Petersburg	Moscow
18:15	Carrascal (yellow card) 14' (yellow-red card) 69'; Parshivlyuk (yellow card) 39'; Balbuena (yellow card) 53'; Smolov 74'; Shunin (yellow card) 90+4'	Report	Rodrigão (yellow card) 71'; Santos (yellow card) 79'	Stadium: VTB Arena; Attendance: 17,831; Referee: Pavel Kukuyan

13 March 2024 RPL QF	Zenit Saint Petersburg	2–0	Dynamo Moscow	Saint Petersburg
20:15	Cassierra 13', 21'; Fernandes (yellow card) 51'; Wendel (yellow card) 62'; Barrios (yellow card) 76'	Report	Laxalt (yellow card) 38'; Parshivlyuk (yellow card) 42'	Stadium: Gazprom Arena; Attendance: 45,407; Referee: Sergey Ivanov

==== Regions path ====
===== Stage 1 =====
13 March 2024 Regions QF 1	Rodina Moscow (2)	1–1 (1–4 p)	Ural Yekaterinburg (1)	Moscow
18:00	Yushin 7'; Bakayev (yellow card) 28'; Kleshchenko (yellow card) 69'	Report	Sungatulin (yellow card) 54'; Kashtanov 75' (pen.); Ítalo (yellow card) 84'	Stadium: Sapsan Arena; Attendance: 964; Referee: Aleksey Sukhoy
	Penalties
	Dmitriyev (penalty missed); Kulikov (penalty missed); Timoshenko (penalty scored)		Bicfalvi (penalty scored); Ishkov (penalty scored); Miškić (penalty scored); Ayupov (penalty scored)

12 March 2024 Regions QF 1	Khimki (2)	2–0	Krasnodar (1)	Khimki
18:00	Khosonov (yellow card) 19' (goal) 25' (pen.); Isayenko 57'; Berkovski (yellow card) 64'; Stepanov (yellow card) 87'	Report	Kady (yellow card) 25'	Stadium: Arena Khimki; Attendance: 1,764; Referee: Kirill Levnikov (St. Petersburg)

13 March 2024 Regions QF 1	Volgar Astrakhan (2)	1–2	Akhmat Grozny (1)	Astrakhan
15:30	Obivalin (yellow card) 44'; Lesnikov (yellow card) 50'; Smirnov (yellow card) 66'; Zhamaletdinov 73'; Krotov (yellow card) 76'; Anisimov (yellow card) 89'; Zuyev (yellow card) 90'	Report	Šatara (yellow card) 14'; Oleynikov 28'; Lovat (yellow card) 47'; Ilyin 58'; Ghandri (yellow card) 61'; Oparin (yellow card) 89'	Stadium: Central Stadium; Attendance: 4,876; Referee: Rafael Shafeyev

14 March 2024 Regions QF 1	SKA-Khabarovsk (2)	1–1 (4–2 p)	Sochi (1)	Sochi
15:30	Podberyozkin (yellow card) 38'; Gongapshev 75'	Report	Guarirapa (yellow card) 8' (goal) 23'; Kravtsov (yellow card) 26'; Saavedra (yellow card) 90'	Stadium: Fisht Olympic Stadium; Attendance: 786; Referee: Roman Safyan
	Penalties
	Kozhemyakin (penalty missed); Petrov (penalty scored); Konovalov (penalty scored); Aliyev (penalty scored); K. Nikitin (penalty scored)		Kramarič (penalty missed); Córdova (penalty missed); Attiyat Allah (penalty scored); Margasov (penalty scored)

===== Stage 2 =====
4 April 2024 Regions QF 2	Akhmat Grozny (1)	0–1	Orenburg (1)	Grozny
19:30	Shvets (yellow card) 26'; Todorović (yellow card) 89'	Report	Stolbov (yellow card) 82'; Šatara 88' (o.g.)	Stadium: Akhmat-Arena; Attendance: 3,671; Referee: Artyom Chistyakov (Azov)

3 April 2024 Regions QF 2	Ural Yekaterinburg (1)	1–0	Lokomotiv Moscow (1)	Yekaterinburg
16:00 (18:00 YEKT)	Emmerson 7'; Miškić (yellow card) 30'; Ayupov (yellow card) 66'; Sungatulin (yellow card) 82'; Al. Mamin (yellow card) 90'	Report	Karpukas (yellow card) 17'; Morozov (yellow card) 80'; Batrakov (yellow card) 90'; Fasson (yellow card) 90+5'	Stadium: Yekaterinburg Arena; Attendance: 12,408; Referee: Kirill Levnikov (Saint Petersburg)

2 April 2024 Regions QF 2	SKA-Khabarovsk (2)	1–2	Dynamo Moscow (1)	Saint Petersburg
17:30	Konovalov (yellow card) 13'; Podberyozkin (yellow card) 52'; Gongapshev 69'; Sharonov (yellow card) 79'; Pokidyshev (yellow card) 89'	Report	Grulyov 12'; Balbuena 74'; Fomin (yellow card) 90'	Stadium: Kirovets Stadium; Attendance: 1,057; Referee: Sergey Tsyganok (Vladivostok)

2 April 2024 Regions QF 2	Khimki (2)	0–0 (6–7 p)	Rostov (1)	Khimki
20:00	Golubović (yellow card) 50'; Yuzepchuk (yellow card) 87'; Terekhov (yellow card) 89'	Report	Melyokhin (yellow card) 46'; Terentyev (yellow card) 48'; Karpin (red card) 90+2'	Stadium: Arena Khimki; Attendance: 2,514; Referee: Aleksey Sukhoy (Lyubertsy)
	Penalties
	Netfullin (penalty scored); Yuzepchuk (penalty missed); Zhuravlyov (penalty scored); Terekhov (penalty scored); Koryan (penalty scored); Kasimov (penalty scored); Volkov (penalty scored); Isayenko (penalty missed)		Ronaldo (penalty scored); Golenkov (penalty scored); Komarov (penalty scored); Osipenko (penalty missed); Mohebi (penalty scored); Sako (penalty scored); El Askalany (penalty scored); Langovich (penalty scored)

=== Semi-finals ===
The RPL path semi-final draw was held on 15 March 2024 live on Match TV TV-channel.

==== RPL path ====
Team 1	Agg.	Team 2	1st leg	2nd leg
Spartak Moscow	1–2	Zenit Saint Petersburg	1–2	0–0
Baltika Kaliningrad	0–3	CSKA Moscow	0–1	0–2

3 April 2024 RPL SF	Spartak Moscow	1–2	Zenit Saint Petersburg	Moscow
20:30	Ugalde 12' (yellow card) 41'; Umyarov (yellow card) 57'; Babić (yellow card) 59'	Report	Alip (yellow card) 41'; Pedro 55', 65' (yellow card) 67'; Sergeyev (yellow card) 90+6'	Stadium: Lukoil Arena; Attendance: 23,849; Referee: Sergei Karasev (Moscow)

17 April 2024 RPL SF	Zenit Saint Petersburg	0–0	Spartak Moscow	Saint Petersburg
19:30		Report	Ugalde (yellow card) 78'; Sobolev (yellow card) 90+1'	Stadium: Gazprom Arena; Attendance: 56,470; Referee: Aleksey Sukhoy (Lyubertsy)

3 April 2024 RPL SF	Baltika Kaliningrad	0–1	CSKA Moscow	Kaliningrad
18:15 (17:15 KALT)	Luna (yellow card) 45+1'; Andrade (yellow card) 59'	Report	Dávila 39'	Stadium: Rostec Arena; Attendance: 14,328; Referee: Sergey Ivanov (Rostov-on-Don)

16 April 2024 RPL SF	CSKA Moscow	2–0	Baltika Kaliningrad	Moscow
19:30	Chalov 34' (pen.); Fayzullaev 36'; Lukin (yellow card) 74'	Report		Stadium: VEB Arena; Attendance: 16,300; Referee: Yan Bobrovsky (St. Petersburg)

==== Regions path ====
The region path stage 1 draw was held on 4 April 2024.

The region path stage 2 draw and the draw to determine the host in the RPL final was held on 17 April 2024.

===== Stage 1 =====
17 April 2024 Regions SF 1	Orenburg (1)	2–4	Dynamo Moscow (1)	Orenburg
17:00 (19:00 YEKT)	Ghorbani 68'; Deogracia (yellow card) 71'; Florentín (yellow card) 90+1'; Thompson 90+2'	Report	Smolov 11'; Tyukavin 62'; Makarov 74'; Carrascal 82'	Stadium: Gazovik Stadium; Attendance: 5,422; Referee: Pavel Kukuyan (Sochi)

17 April 2024 Regions SF 1	Ural Yekaterinburg (1)	1–3	Rostov (1)	Yekaterinburg
17:00 (19:00 YEKT)	Kiki (yellow card) 6'; Schettine 10'; Begić (yellow card) 69'	Report	Langovich (yellow card) 21'; Semenchuk (yellow card) 37'; Komarov 60'; Terentyev 72'; El Askalany (yellow card) 79'; Komlichenko 90+5'	Stadium: Yekaterinburg Arena; Attendance: 11,578; Referee: Vladislav Bezborodov (St. Petersburg)

===== Stage 2 =====
2 May 2024 Regions SF 2	Rostov (1)	0–1	Baltika Kaliningrad (1)	Rostov-on-Don
19:15	Aznaurov (yellow card) 27'	Report	Avanesyan 4'; Radmanovac (yellow card) 29'; Latyshonok (yellow card) 90+7'	Stadium: Rostov Arena; Attendance: 15,708; Referee: Kirill Levnikov (St. Petersburg)

1 May 2024 Regions SF 2	Dynamo Moscow (1)	0–2	Spartak Moscow (1)	Moscow
18:00	Smolov (yellow card) 56'; Carrascal (yellow card) 78'	Report	Sobolev 9'; Ignatov 39'; Prutsev (yellow card) 59'	Stadium: VTB Arena; Attendance: 25,512; Referee: Aleksey Sukhoy (Lyubertsy)

=== Path finals ===
==== RPL path ====
Team 1	Agg.	Team 2	1st leg	2nd leg
CSKA Moscow	1–1 (4–5 p)	Zenit Saint Petersburg	1–1	0–0

2 May 2024 RPL final	CSKA Moscow	1–1	Zenit Saint Petersburg	Moscow
19:15	Zabolotny 53'	Report	Yerokhin 84'	Stadium: VEB Arena; Attendance: 23,158; Referee: Sergei Karasev (Moscow)

15 May 2024 RPL final	Zenit Saint Petersburg	0–0 (5–4 p)	CSKA Moscow	Saint Petersburg
20:45	Vasilyev (yellow card) 12'; Claudinho (yellow card) 87'	Report	Diveyev (yellow card) 83'	Stadium: Gazprom Arena; Attendance: 50,115; Referee: Pavel Kukuyan (Sochi)
	Penalties
	Cassierra (penalty scored); Isidor (penalty scored); Mostovoy (penalty scored); Alip (penalty scored); Claudinho (penalty scored)		(penalty scored) Dávila; (penalty scored) Oblyakov; (penalty missed) Zabolotny; (penalty scored) Diveyev; (penalty scored) Musayev

==== Regions path ====
The host was determined by a draw on 2 May 2024.

14 May 2024 Regions final	Baltika Kaliningrad (1)	1–0	Spartak Moscow (1)	Kaliningrad
20:45 (19:45 KALT)	Andrade 4'; Kaplenko (yellow card) 18'; Fernandes (yellow card) 90+6'	Report	Litvinov (yellow card) 15'	Stadium: Rostec Arena; Attendance: 26,717; Referee: Vladislav Bezborodov (St. Petersburg)

=== Final ===
The formal host was determined by a draw on 15 May 2024. The host club chooses the dressing room, the reserves bench, the uniform color and the times for warm-up and pre-game press conference.

2 June 2024
18:00 MSK (UTC+3)

Baltika Kaliningrad (1)	1–2	Zenit Saint Petersburg (1)
Fernandes 41'	Report	Nino 81'; Alip 90+5'

Luzhniki Stadium, Moscow
Attendance: 41,776
Referee: Sergei Karasev
