= Kanishchev =

Kanishchev (Russian: Канищев) is a Russian masculine surname, its feminine counterpart is Kanishcheva. It may refer to

- Alexander Kanishchev (born 1960), Soviet football player
- Aleksandr Kanishchev (footballer, born 1998), Russian football player
- Anatoli Kanishchev (born 1971), Russian association football player
- Pavel Kanishchev (1986 - 2025), Russian extremist, chairman of Eurasian Youth Union
