= Nikita Sergeyev =

Nikita Sergeyev may refer to:

- Nikita Sergeyev (footballer, born 1992), Russian football defender
- Nikita Sergeyev (footballer, born 1999), Russian football forward
