= Timur Nikolayev =

Russian footballer

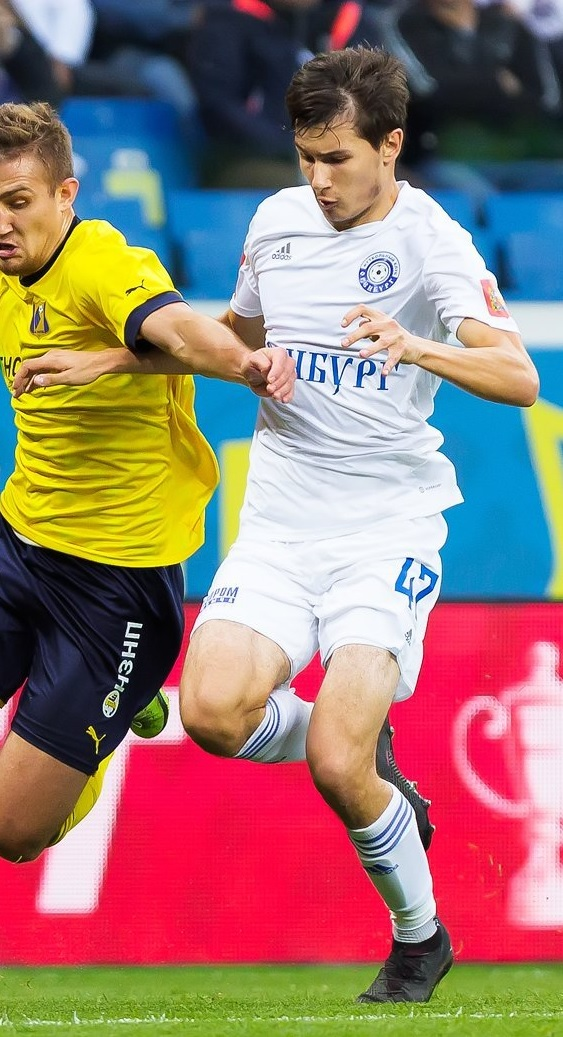
- Nikolayev with Orenburg in 2022

Personal information
- Full name: Timur Sergeyevich Nikolayev
- Date of birth: 31 January 2001 (age 25)
- Place of birth: Kazan, Russia
- Height: 1.83 m (6 ft 0 in)
- Position: Centre-back

Team information
- Current team: Dynamo Vladivostok
- Number: 47

Senior career*
Years	Team	Apps	(Gls)
2020–2022	Orenburg-2	66	(2)
2022–2023	Orenburg	0	(0)
2023	→ Forte Taganrog (loan)	11	(0)
2023–2025	Forte Taganrog	56	(4)
2025–	Dynamo Vladivostok	48	(3)
- * Club domestic league appearances and goals as of 15 November 2026

Timur Sergeyevich Nikolayev (Russian: Тимур Сергеевич Николаев; born 31 January 2001) is a Russian football player who plays as a centre-back for Dynamo Vladivostok.

== Club career ==
He made his debut for Orenburg on 31 August 2022 in a Russian Cup game against Akhmat Grozny.

== Career statistics ==
As of 27 November 2022

Club	Season	League			Cup		Continental		Total	
Club	Season	Division	Apps	Goals	Apps	Goals	Apps	Goals	Apps	Goals
Orenburg-2	2020–21	Second League	25	1	–		–		25	1
Orenburg-2	2021–22	Second League	24	1	–		–		24	1
Orenburg-2	2022–23	Second League	17	0	–		–		17	0
Orenburg-2	Total		66	2	0	0	0	0	66	2
Orenburg	2021–22	First League	0	0	0	0	–		0	0
Orenburg	2022–23	RPL	0	0	2	0	–		2	0
Orenburg	Total		0	0	2	0	0	0	2	0
Career total			66	2	2	0	0	0	68	2
