= Daur Kvekveskiri =

Russian footballer

Personal information
- Full name: Daur Lerikovich Kvekveskiri
- Date of birth: 7 February 1998 (age 28)
- Place of birth: Gali, Abkhazia, Georgia
- Height: 1.72 m (5 ft 8 in)
- Positions: Midfielder; forward

Team information
- Current team: Dynamo Vladivostok
- Number: 11

Youth career
- –2016: Krasnodar

Senior career*
| Years | Team | Apps | (Gls) |
| 2015–2016 | Krasnodar-2 | 20 | (0) |
| 2017 | Napredak Kruševac | 2 | (0) |
| 2018 | Biolog-Novokubansk | 5 | (0) |
| 2018 | Znamya Truda Orekhovo-Zuyevo | 8 | (0) |
| 2019 | Luch Vladivostok | 23 | (3) |
| 2020 | Yenisey Krasnoyarsk | 1 | (0) |
| 2020–2021 | Akron Tolyatti | 22 | (2) |
| 2021–2022 | Amkar Perm | 27 | (2) |
| 2022–2024 | Chayka Peschanokopskoye | 58 | (5) |
| 2024 | Forte Taganrog | 8 | (1) |
| 2025–2026 | Tekstilshchik Ivanovo | 31 | (2) |
| 2026 | Sibir Novosibirsk | 18 | (3) |
| 2026– | Dynamo Vladivostok | 14 | (0) |

International career^{‡}
| 2017– | Abkhazia | 4 | (0) |
- * Club domestic league appearances and goals as of 15 November 2026 ‡ National team caps and goals as of 31 July 2017

Daur Larikovich Kvekveskiri (Abkhaz: Даур Ларик-иҧа Қәақәасқьыр; Russian: Даур Лерикович Квеквескири; born 7 February 1998) is a Russian football midfielder who plays for Dynamo Vladivostok and the Abkhazia national team.

== Club career ==
Kvekveskiri was born in Gali, in Abkhazia, Georgia. He represented the Abkhazia national team at the 2017 ConIFA European Football Cup and he played all four games (Abkhazia finished fourth).

He made his debut in the Russian Professional Football League for Krasnodar-2 on 9 April 2015 in a game against FC Astrakhan.

In February 2017, after trials, Kvekveskiri signed with Serbian side Napredak Kruševac. Kvekveskiri made his debut in the 2016–17 Serbian SuperLiga when entering as substitute on 28th-round game played on April 1, against Novi Pazar.

He made his Russian Football National League debut for Luch Vladivostok on 7 July 2019 in a game against FC Khimki.
