= Abdula Bagamayev =

Russian footballer (born 2004)

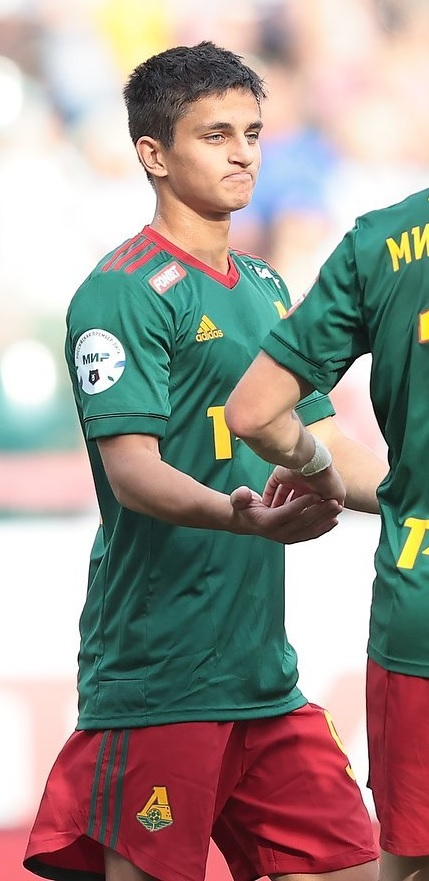
- Bagamayev with Lokomotiv Moscow in 2022

Personal information
- Full name: Abdula Musayevich Bagamayev
- Date of birth: 18 October 2004 (age 22)
- Place of birth: Nyagan, Russia
- Height: 1.75 m (5 ft 9 in)
- Position: Attacking midfielder

Team information
- Current team: Fakel Voronezh
- Number: 8

Youth career
- –2021: FC Tyumen
- 2021–2023: Lokomotiv Moscow

Senior career*
Years	Team	Apps	(Gls)
2022–2023	Lokomotiv Moscow	1	(0)
2023–	Fakel Voronezh	50	(2)
2025	→ Dynamo Vladivostok (loan)	15	(3)
- * Club domestic league appearances and goals as of 21 November 2026

Abdula Musayevich Bagamayev (Russian: Абдула Мусаевич Багамаев; born 18 October 2004) is a Russian footballer who plays as an attacking midfielder for Fakel Voronezh.

== Club career ==
Bagamayev made his debut in the Russian Premier League for Lokomotiv Moscow on 28 August 2022 in a game against Orenburg.

On 30 June 2023, Bagamayev joined Fakel Voronezh for free with a buy-back clause. On 17 February 2025, Bagamayev was loaned to Dynamo Vladivostok.

== Career statistics ==
As of match played 21 November 2026

Appearances and goals by club, season and competition
Club	Season	League			Cup		Total	
Club	Season	Division	Apps	Goals	Apps	Goals	Apps	Goals
Lokomotiv Moscow	2022–23	Russian Premier League	1	0	0	0	1	0
Fakel Voronezh	2023–24	Russian Premier League	7	0	4	0	11	0
Fakel Voronezh	2024–25	Russian Premier League	3	0	5	0	8	0
Fakel Voronezh	2025–26	Russian First League	27	2	1	0	28	2
Fakel Voronezh	2026–27	Russian Premier League	13	0	5	1	18	1
Fakel Voronezh	Total		50	2	15	1	65	3
Dynamo Vladivostok (loan)	2024–25	Russian Second League A	15	3	—		15	3
Career total			66	5	15	1	81	6
