= Anton Betyuzhnov =

Russian football player

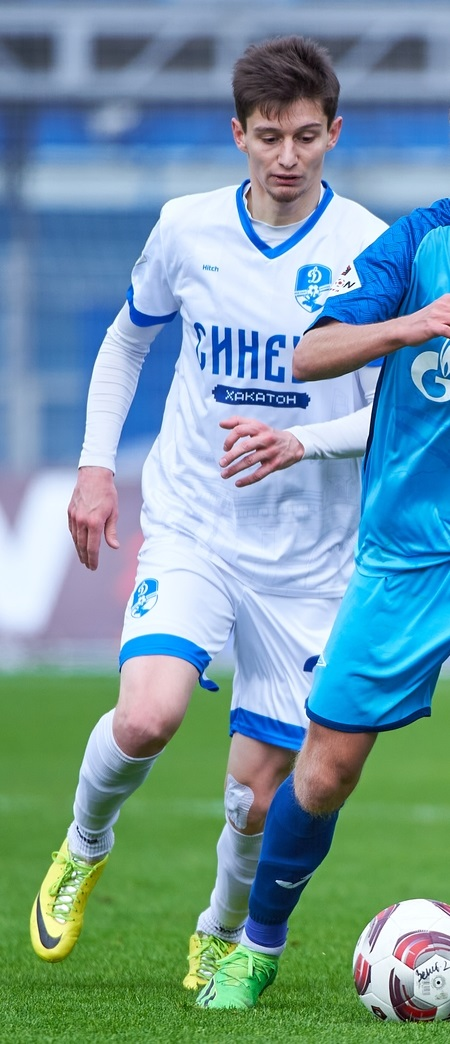
- Betyuzhnov with Dynamo Vologda in 2024

Personal information
- Full name: Anton Andreyevich Betyuzhnov
- Date of birth: 8 May 1997 (age 29)
- Place of birth: Semibratovo, Yaroslavl Oblast, Russia
- Height: 1.80 m (5 ft 11 in)
- Positions: Forward; midfielder

Team information
- Current team: FC Dynamo Vologda
- Number: 27

Youth career
- –2015: FC Shinnik Yaroslavl

Senior career*
| Years | Team | Apps | (Gls) |
| 2016–2022 | FC Shinnik Yaroslavl | 35 | (1) |
| 2017–2018 | → FC Murom (loan) | 24 | (4) |
| 2018–2019 | → FC Znamya Truda Orekhovo-Zuyevo (loan) | 21 | (2) |
| 2022–2023 | FC Znamya Truda Orekhovo-Zuyevo | 27 | (7) |
| 2023– | FC Dynamo Vologda | 91 | (19) |
- * Club domestic league appearances and goals as of 1 November 2026

Anton Andreyevich Betyuzhnov (Russian: Антон Андреевич Бетюжнов; born 8 May 1997) is a Russian football player. He plays for FC Dynamo Vologda.

== Club career ==
He made his debut in the Russian Football National League for FC Shinnik Yaroslavl on 15 May 2016 in a game against FC Sibir Novosibirsk.
