= Artyom Voropayev =

Russian footballer

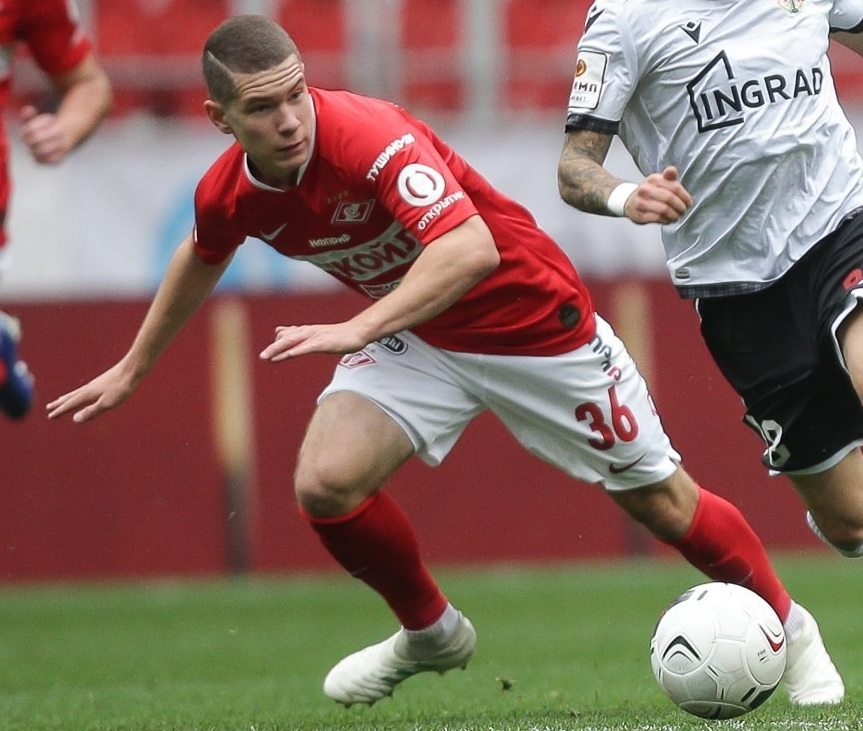
- Voropayev with Spartak-2 in 2019

Personal information
- Full name: Artyom Arkadyevich Voropayev
- Date of birth: 30 October 1999 (age 27)
- Place of birth: Samara, Russia
- Height: 1.73 m (5 ft 8 in)
- Position: Defender

Team information
- Current team: Dynamo Vladivostok
- Number: 36

Youth career
- Konoplyov football academy

Senior career*
Years	Team	Apps	(Gls)
2016–2019	Lada-Tolyatti	31	(0)
2018–2019	→ Spartak-2 Moscow (loan)	35	(0)
2019–2022	Spartak-2 Moscow	101	(5)
2022–2024	Rodina Moscow	42	(1)
2023–2024	→ Chernomorets Novorossiysk (loan)	11	(1)
2024–2025	Tyumen	13	(1)
2025–2026	Sibir Novosibirsk	7	(0)
2026–	Dynamo Vladivostok	34	(1)
- * Club domestic league appearances and goals as of 15 November 2026

Artyom Arkadyevich Voropayev (Russian: Артём Аркадьевич Воропаев; born 30 October 1999) is a Russian football player who plays for Dynamo Vladivostok.

== Club career ==
He made his debut in the Russian Professional Football League for Lada-Tolyatti on 14 April 2016 in a game against Chelyabinsk.

He made his Russian Football National League debut for Spartak-2 Moscow on 17 July 2018 in a game against Sochi.
