= Yevgeni Steshin =

Russian footballer

Personal information
- Full name: Yevgeni Aleksandrovich Steshin
- Date of birth: 14 April 1992 (age 34)
- Place of birth: Yaroslavl, Russia
- Height: 1.75 m (5 ft 9 in)
- Position: Defender

Team information
- Current team: FC Dynamo Vladivostok
- Number: 4

Senior career*
Years	Team	Apps	(Gls)
2012–2015	FC Shinnik Yaroslavl	54	(1)
2015–2017	FC Volgar Astrakhan	32	(0)
2017–2018	FC Luch-Energiya Vladivostok	7	(0)
2018–2023	FC Shinnik Yaroslavl	77	(1)
2023–2026	FC Tekstilshchik Ivanovo	60	(3)
2026–	FC Dynamo Vladivostok	1	(0)
- * Club domestic league appearances and goals as of 15 November 2026

Yevgeni Aleksandrovich Steshin (Russian: Евгений Александрович Стешин; born 14 April 1992) is a Russian professional football player who plays for FC Dynamo Vladivostok.

== Club career ==
He made his Russian Football National League debut for FC Shinnik Yaroslavl on 4 April 2012 in a game against FC Mordovia Saransk.
