= Konstantin Dzutsev =

Russian footballer

Personal information
- Full name: Konstantin Khazbiyevich Dzutsev
- Date of birth: 22 October 1970 (age 56)
- Place of birth: Kemerovo, Russian SFSR, USSR
- Height: 1.84 m (6 ft 1/2 in)
- Positions: Defender; midfielder

Team information
- Current team: FC Dynamo Vladivostok (manager)

Senior career*
Years	Team	Apps	(Gls)
1992	FC Dynamo Kemerovo	19	(0)
1993–1994	FC Kuzbass Kemerovo	48	(7)
1995–1997	FC Zarya Leninsk-Kuznetsky	67	(3)
1998	FC SKA Khabarovsk	28	(3)
1999	FC Sibiryak Bratsk	28	(4)
2000–2001	FC Chkalovets-Olimpik Novosibirsk	38	(5)
2002–2003	FC Chkalovets-1936 Novosibirsk	47	(0)
2004–2005	FC Dynamo Barnaul	26	(2)
2006	FC Kuzbass-Dynamo Kemerovo	34	(0)

Managerial career
- 2008–2009: FC KUZBASS Kemerovo
- 2011–2013: FC Metallurg-Kuzbass Novokuznetsk (assistant)
- 2014–2015: FC Metallurg Novokuznetsk
- 2015–2016: FC Baikal Irkutsk
- 2016–2018: FC Chita
- 2018–2022: FC Kaluga
- 2022: FC Forte Taganrog
- 2023–2025: FC Irkutsk
- 2026–: FC Dynamo Vladivostok
- * Club domestic league appearances and goals

Konstantin Khazbiyevich Dzutsev (Russian: Константин Хазбиевич Дзуцев; born 22 October 1970) is a Russian professional football coach and a former player. He is the manager of FC Dynamo Vladivostok.

== Club career ==
As a player, he made his debut in the Russian Second Division in 1992 for FC Dynamo Kemerovo. He played 4 seasons in the Russian Football National League.

== Honours ==
- Russian Professional Football League Zone East best coach: 2016–17.
