= Yegor Dorokhov =

Russian footballer

Personal information
- Full name: Yegor Alekseyevich Dorokhov
- Date of birth: 24 May 2000 (age 26)
- Place of birth: Zlatoust, Chelyabinsk Oblast, Russia
- Height: 1.85 m (6 ft 1 in)
- Position: Forward

Youth career
- 2013–2017: Academy Football Chelyabinsk
- 2017: FC Chelyabinsk

Senior career*
Years	Team	Apps	(Gls)
2018–2021	FC Chelyabinsk	61	(23)
2022–2023	FC Torpedo Moscow	1	(0)
2022	→ FC Veles Moscow (loan)	5	(0)
2022–2023	→ FC Chelyabinsk (loan)	17	(2)
2023–2024	FC Dynamo Vladivostok	38	(9)
2025	FC KDV Tomsk	21	(5)
- * Club domestic league appearances and goals as of 19 October 2025

Yegor Alekseyevich Dorokhov (Russian: Егор Алексеевич Дорохов; born 24 May 2000) is a Russian football player.

== Club career ==
He made his debut in the Russian Professional Football League for FC Chelyabinsk on 10 April 2018 in a game against FC Neftekhimik Nizhnekamsk.

He made his Russian Football National League debut for FC Torpedo Moscow on 7 May 2022 in a game against FC Veles Moscow.

On 14 July 2022, Dorokhov was loaned to FC Veles Moscow.

== Honours ==
Torpedo Moscow

- Russian Football National League : 2021-22
