= Nikita Sergeyev (footballer, born 1992) =

Russian footballer, born 1992

Personal information
- Full name: Nikita Nikolayevich Sergeyev
- Date of birth: 14 February 1992 (age 34)
- Place of birth: Tver, Russia
- Height: 1.87 m (6 ft 2 in)
- Position: Defender

Team information
- Current team: FC Dynamo Vladivostok
- Number: 5

Youth career
- 1999–2005: Y. M. Mikhailov SDYuSShOR
- 2006–2013: FC Dynamo Moscow

Senior career*
Years	Team	Apps	(Gls)
2014	FC Kaluga	12	(0)
2015	FC Volga Tver	28	(1)
2016	PFC Slavia Sofia	3	(0)
2017	FC Domodedovo	7	(0)
2017–2019	FC Torpedo Moscow	39	(1)
2019–2020	FC Novosibirsk	9	(0)
2020–2021	FC Kuban-Holding Pavlovskaya	25	(3)
2021–2022	FC Murom	28	(3)
2022–	FC Dynamo Vladivostok	122	(8)
- * Club domestic league appearances and goals as of 15 November 2026

Nikita Nikolayevich Sergeyev (Russian: Никита Николаевич Сергеев; born 14 February 1992) is a Russian footballer who plays as a defender for FC Dynamo Vladivostok.

== Club career ==
He made his Russian Professional Football League debut for FC Kaluga on 12 July 2014 in a game against FC Zenit Penza.

He made his debut in the First Professional Football League (Bulgaria) for PFC Slavia Sofia on 17 April 2016 in a game against OFC Pirin Blagoevgrad.
