= Ruslan Imayev =

Russian footballer

Personal information
- Full name: Ruslan Ravilyevich Imayev
- Date of birth: 1 February 1994 (age 32)
- Place of birth: Moscow, Russia
- Height: 1.83 m (6 ft 0 in)
- Position: Centre back

Youth career
- FC Lokomotiv Moscow

Senior career*
Years	Team	Apps	(Gls)
2013	FC Kaluga	7	(0)
2014–2015	FC Podolye Podolsky district	26	(1)
2016	FC Neftekhimik Nizhnekamsk	1	(0)
2017	FC Znamya Truda Orekhovo-Zuyevo	9	(1)
2017	FC Dacia Chișinău	7	(0)
2018	FC Rubin Yalta		
2018	FC Krymteplytsia Molodizhne		
2019–2020	FC Zorkiy Krasnogorsk	23	(1)
2020	FC Lobnya-Alla (amateur)		
2021–2022	FC Zorkiy Krasnogorsk (amateur)		
2022–2023	FC Zorkiy Krasnogorsk	29	(4)
2023	FC Amkal Moscow (amateur)		
2023	FC Zorkiy Krasnogorsk	5	(0)
- * Club domestic league appearances and goals

Ruslan Ravilyevich Imayev (Russian: Руслан Равильевич Имаев; born 1 February 1994) is a Russian former football defender.

== Club career ==
He made his debut in the Russian Second Division for FC Kaluga on 22 July 2013 in a game against FC Dynamo Bryansk.

He made his Russian Football National League debut for FC Neftekhimik Nizhnekamsk on 11 July 2016 in a game against FC Yenisey Krasnoyarsk.
