= Andrey Ivlev =

Russian footballer (born 2006)

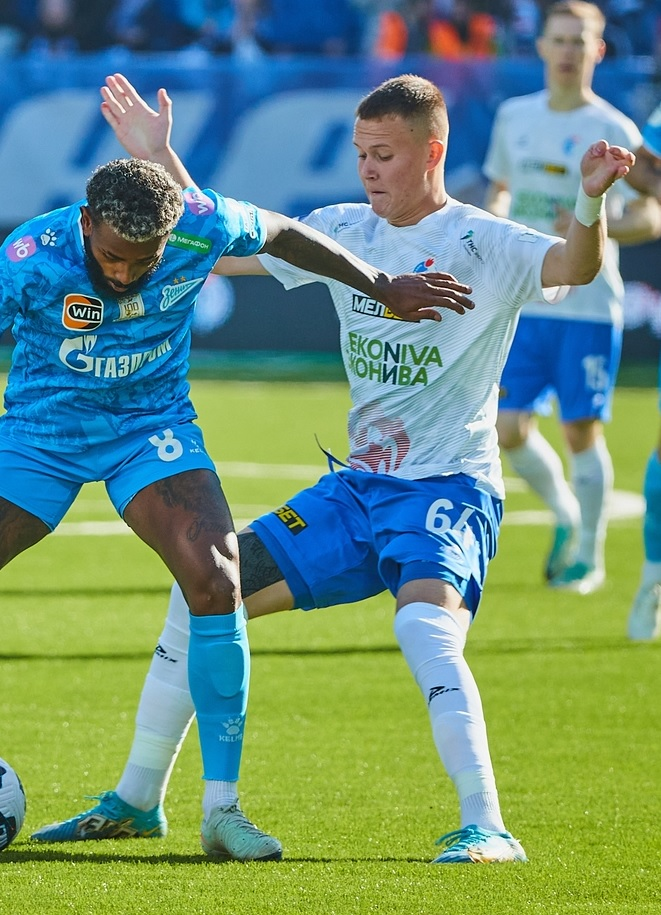
- Ivlev with Fakel in 2025

Personal information
- Full name: Andrey Igorevich Ivlev
- Date of birth: 21 November 2006 (age 19)
- Place of birth: Moscow, Russia
- Height: 1.80 m (5 ft 11 in)
- Position: Right winger

Team information
- Current team: Pari Nizhny Novgorod
- Number: 77

Youth career
- –2021: Dynamo Moscow
- 2021–2022: Spartak Moscow
- 2023: Fakel Voronezh

Senior career*
Years	Team	Apps	(Gls)
2023–2025	Fakel Voronezh	21	(0)
2025–	Pari Nizhny Novgorod	25	(0)

International career^{‡}
2022	Russia U-16	2	(2)
2022–2023	Russia U-17	8	(1)
2023	Russia U-18	3	(0)
2024–	Russia U-19	4	(3)
- * Club domestic league appearances and goals as of 11 May 2026 ‡ National team caps and goals as of 17 November 2024

Andrey Igorevich Ivlev (Russian: Андрей Игоревич Ивлев; born 21 November 2006) is a Russian football player who plays as a right winger for Pari Nizhny Novgorod.

== Career ==
Ivlev made his debut for Fakel Voronezh on 9 August 2023 in a Russian Cup game against CSKA Moscow. He made his Russian Premier League debut for Fakel on 11 August 2024 against Krylia Sovetov Samara.

On 19 June 2025, Ivlev signed a three-year contract with Pari Nizhny Novgorod.

== Career statistics ==
As of 11 May 2026

Club	Season	League			Cup		Total	
Club	Season	Division	Apps	Goals	Apps	Goals	Apps	Goals
Fakel Voronezh	2023–24	Russian Premier League	0	0	5	0	5	0
Fakel Voronezh	2024–25	Russian Premier League	21	0	6	0	27	0
Fakel Voronezh	Total		21	0	11	0	32	0
Pari Nizhny Novgorod	2025–26	Russian Premier League	25	0	5	0	30	0
Career total			46	0	16	0	62	0
