= Mikhail Lyamzin =

Russian footballer

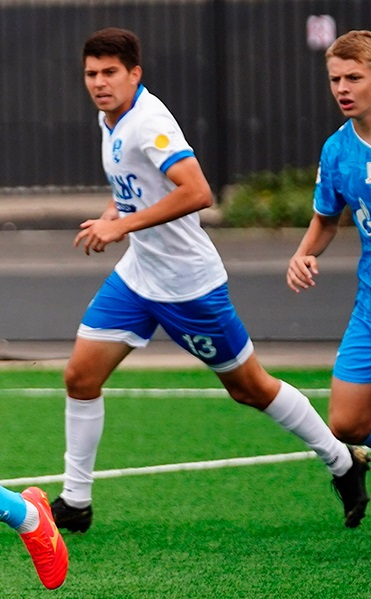
- Lyamzin with Dynamo Vologda in 2024

Personal information
- Full name: Mikhail Sergeyevich Lyamzin
- Date of birth: 8 December 2002 (age 23)
- Place of birth: Moscow, Russia
- Height: 1.76 m (5 ft 9 in)
- Position: Midfielder

Team information
- Current team: FC Dynamo Vologda
- Number: 13

Youth career
- –2020: FC Chertanovo Moscow

Senior career*
Years	Team	Apps	(Gls)
2021–2023	FC Chertanovo Moscow	44	(1)
2023	FC Tekstilshchik Ivanovo	10	(0)
2024–	FC Dynamo Vologda	59	(1)
- * Club domestic league appearances and goals as of 1 November 2026

Mikhail Sergeyevich Lyamzin (Russian: Михаил Сергеевич Лямзин; born 8 December 2002) is a Russian football player who plays for FC Dynamo Vologda.

== Club career ==
He made his debut in the Russian Football National League for FC Chertanovo Moscow on 14 March 2021 in a game against FC Fakel Voronezh.
