= Georgi Margiyev =

Russian footballer (born 2000)

Personal information
- Full name: Georgi Tamazovich Margiyev
- Date of birth: 8 July 2000 (age 26)
- Height: 1.76 m (5 ft 9 in)
- Position: Midfielder

Senior career*
Years	Team	Apps	(Gls)
2018–2022	FC Tyumen	29	(1)
2022–2023	FC Nosta Novotroitsk	23	(0)
2023	FC Zenit Penza	10	(0)
- * Club domestic league appearances and goals as of 12 November 2023

Georgi Tamazovich Margiyev (Russian: Георгий Тамазович Маргиев; born 8 July 2000) is a Russian football player.

== Club career ==
He made his debut in the Russian Football National League for FC Tyumen on 28 April 2019 in a game against FC Fakel Voronezh.
