= Gevork Sarkisyan =

Russian footballer

Personal information
- Full name: Gevork Grigoryevich Sarkisyan
- Date of birth: 5 November 1999 (age 27)
- Place of birth: Moscow, Russia
- Height: 1.79 m (5 ft 10 in)
- Position: Forward

Team information
- Current team: FC Saturn Ramenskoye

Youth career
- –2019: FC Lokomotiv Moscow

Senior career*
Years	Team	Apps	(Gls)
2018–2019	FC Kazanka Moscow	3	(0)
2020–2021	FC Znamya Truda Orekhovo-Zuyevo	12	(2)
2022–2025	FC Veles Moscow	98	(22)
2026–	FC Saturn Ramenskoye		
- * Club domestic league appearances and goals as of 7 February 2026

Gevork Grigoryevich Sarkisyan (Russian: Геворк Григорьевич Саркисян; born 5 November 1999) is a Russian football player of Armenian descent.

== Club career ==
He made his debut in the Russian Football National League for FC Veles Moscow on 6 March 2022 in a game against FC Akron Tolyatti.
