= Yevgeni Pesikov =

Russian footballer

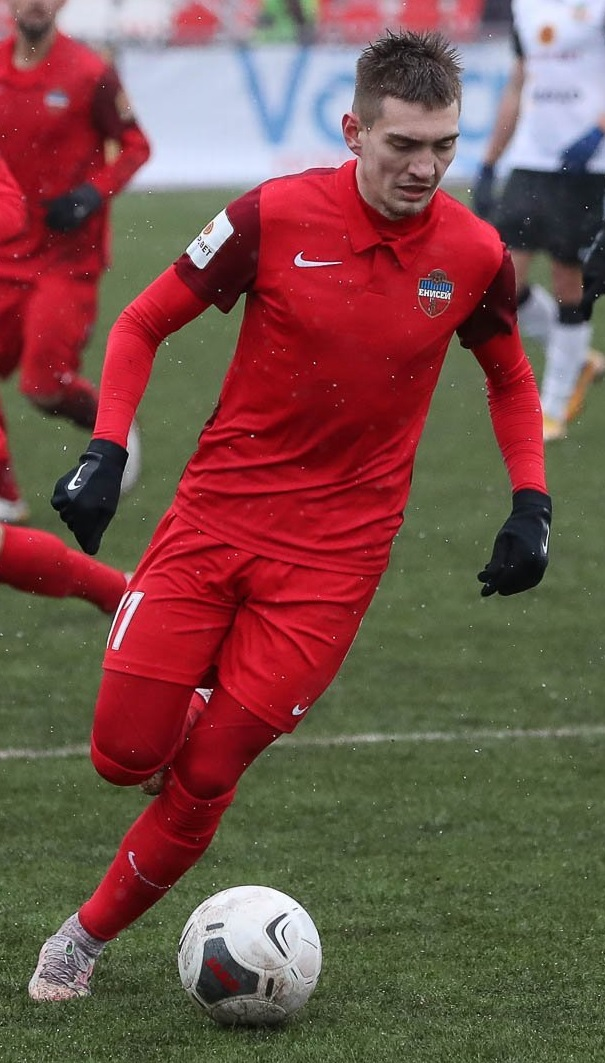
- Pesikov with Yenisey in 2021

Personal information
- Full name: Yevgeni Aleksandrovich Pesikov
- Date of birth: 6 April 1999 (age 27)
- Place of birth: Krasnoyarsk, Russia
- Height: 1.75 m (5 ft 9 in)
- Position: Midfielder

Team information
- Current team: FC Dynamo Vladivostok
- Number: 9

Youth career
- FC Yenisey Krasnoyarsk

Senior career*
Years	Team	Apps	(Gls)
2016	FC Lesstroyinvest Pirovsky District		
2016	FC Achinsk		
2017–2023	FC Yenisey Krasnoyarsk	61	(4)
2021–2023	FC Yenisey-2 Krasnoyarsk	29	(14)
2023–2025	FC Veles Moscow	66	(8)
2025–2026	FC Alay	12	(0)
2026	FC Dynamo Kirov	18	(2)
2026–	FC Dynamo Vladivostok	16	(4)
- * Club domestic league appearances and goals as of 15 November 2026

Yevgeni Aleksandrovich Pesikov (Russian: Евгений Александрович Песиков; born 6 April 1999) is a Russian football player who plays for FC Dynamo Vladivostok.

== Club career ==
He made his debut in the Russian Football National League for FC Yenisey Krasnoyarsk on 14 August 2019 in a game against FC Shinnik Yaroslavl, as a starter.
