= FC Dynamo Vologda =

Russian football club

- Full name: Футбольный клуб Динамо Вологда (Football Club Dynamo Vologda)
- Founded: March 3, 1926; 100 years ago
- Ground: Dynamo Stadium, Vologda
- Capacity: 8,900
- President: Olga Zykova
- Head coach: Rudolf Chesalov
- League: Second League, Division B, Group 2
- 2026: 11th
- Website: dynamovologda.ru

FC Dynamo Vologda (Russian: ФК «Динамо» Вологда) is a Russian football club from Vologda, founded on March 3, 1926, and competing professionally since 1966. They currently play in the Second League.

== History ==
It was called FC Lokomotiv Vologda until 1966. After 2011 season, it was relegated from the Russian Second Division. The highest level it ever achieved was Russian First Division, where it played in 1992 and 1993.

== Current squad ==
As of 11 September 2026, according to the Russian Second League Division B official website.

Note: Flags indicate national team as defined under FIFA eligibility rules; some limited exceptions apply. Players may hold more than one non-FIFA nationality.

No.	Pos.	Nation	Player
1	GK	RUS	Roman Anikeyev
2	DF	RUS	Mikhail Petrolay (vice-captain)
3	DF	RUS	Pavel Rakitin
6	MF	RUS	Sergei Oliynyk
8	MF	RUS	Ilya Antonov (on loan from Rodina Moscow)
12	DF	RUS	Dmitri Dolgov
13	MF	RUS	Mikhail Lyamzin
14	MF	RUS	Yaroslav Frolov
15	MF	RUS	Vsevolod Bykov
17	MF	RUS	Vladislav Pronin
18	DF	RUS	Daniil Krivoruchko (vice-captain)
19	DF	RUS	Danil Spodarets

No.	Pos.	Nation	Player
20	DF	RUS	Ivan Vaygachev
22	MF	RUS	Nikita Kireyev
24	DF	RUS	Aleksandr Golovnya
27	FW	RUS	Anton Betyuzhnov
28	FW	RUS	Matvey Burlakov (on loan from Rodina Moscow)
29	MF	RUS	Igor Santalov
39	MF	RUS	Artyom Isik
67	FW	RUS	Yegor Vasilkov
71	DF	RUS	Nikita Krivoruchko
88	FW	RUS	Andrey Shumarin
94	GK	RUS	Vladimir Malyshev

== Personnel ==
Position	Name	Nationality
Head coach:	Rudolf Chesalov	(Russia)
Assistant coach:	Artyom Bobrov	(Russia)
Assistant coach:	Vladimir Parnyakov	(Russia)
Goalkeeper coach:	Aleksandr Lobanov	(Russia)
Team Supervisor:	Sergei Rodionov	(Russia)
Administrator:	Daniil Kokarev	(Russia)
Administrator:	Mikhail Pavlovski	(Russia)
Masseur:	Nikolai Kim	(Russia)
Doctor:	Padma Shri	(Russia) (India)
