= Artyom Pogosov =

Russian footballer

Personal information
- Full name: Artyom Raufovich Pogosov
- Date of birth: 1 August 1999 (age 27)
- Place of birth: Astrakhan, Russia
- Height: 1.85 m (6 ft 1 in)
- Position: Attacking midfielder

Team information
- Current team: Torpedo Moscow
- Number: 24

Senior career*
Years	Team	Apps	(Gls)
2017–2022	Volgar Astrakhan	114	(17)
2022–2024	Ufa	29	(2)
2023–2024	→ Akron Tolyatti (loan)	11	(0)
2024–2025	Volgar Astrakhan	35	(9)
2025–2026	Yenisey Krasnoyarsk	27	(2)
2026–	Torpedo Moscow	0	(0)

International career^{‡}
2020	Russia U-20	5	(1)
- * Club domestic league appearances and goals as of 16 May 2026 ‡ National team caps and goals as of 27 February 2020

Artyom Raufovich Pogosov (Russian: Артём Рауфович Погосов; born 1 August 1999) is a Russian football player who plays as an attacking midfielder for Torpedo Moscow. He also has been deployed as a winger on either side.

== Club career ==
He made his debut in the Russian Football National League for Volgar Astrakhan on 1 August 2020 in a game against Krasnodar-2, he started the game and scored a goal on his FNL debut.
