= Albek Gongapshev =

Russian footballer

Personal information
- Full name: Albek Musayevich Gongapshev
- Date of birth: 19 April 2000 (age 26)
- Place of birth: Nalchik, Russia
- Height: 1.80 m (5 ft 11 in)
- Position: Forward

Team information
- Current team: Shinnik Yaroslavl
- Number: 10

Senior career*
Years	Team	Apps	(Gls)
2019	Spartak Nalchik	9	(1)
2019–2022	Shinnik Yaroslavl	79	(11)
2023–2025	SKA-Khabarovsk	68	(5)
2025–	Shinnik Yaroslavl	34	(4)
- * Club domestic league appearances and goals as of 16 May 2026

Albek Musayevich Gongapshev (Russian: Альбек Мусаевич Гонгапшев; born 19 April 2000) is a Russian football player who plays for Shinnik Yaroslavl.

== Club career ==
He made his debut in the Russian Professional Football League for Spartak Nalchik on 23 March 2019 in a game against Krasnodar-3.

He made his Russian Football National League debut for Shinnik Yaroslavl on 28 July 2019 in a game against Luch Vladivostok.
