= Belokamenka, Murmansk Oblast =

Belokamenka Белокаменка
- Selo
- Interactive map of Belokamenka
- Location of Belokamenka Belokamenka (Murmansk Oblast)
- Coordinates: 69°05′N 33°12′E
- Country: Russia
- Federal subject: Murmansk Oblast
- Elevation: 5 m (16 ft)

Population (2010 Census)
  - Total: 84
  - Estimate (2021): 95 (+13.1%)

Administrative status
  - Subordinated to: Closed Administrative-Territorial Formation of Alexandrovsk

Municipal status
  - Urban okrug: Alexandrovsk Urban Okrug
- Time zone: UTC+3 (MSK)
- Postal code: 184664
- Dialing code: +7 81551
- OKTMO ID: 47605402107

Belokamenka (Russian: Белокаменка) is a rural locality (a selo) in administrative jurisdiction of the closed administrative-territorial formation of Alexandrovsk in Murmansk Oblast, Russia, located beyond the Arctic Circle at a height of 1 meter (3 ft 3 in) above sea level. As of the 2010 Census, it had a population of 84.
