= Aleksandr Kanishchev (footballer, born 1998) =

Russian footballer

Personal information
- Full name: Aleksandr Ruslanovich Kanishchev
- Date of birth: 16 January 1998 (age 28)
- Place of birth: Belgorod, Russia
- Height: 1.78 m (5 ft 10 in)
- Position: Midfielder

Team information
- Current team: FC Salyut Belgorod
- Number: 7

Youth career
- Chertanovo Education Center

Senior career*
Years	Team	Apps	(Gls)
2015–2021	FC Chertanovo Moscow	56	(6)
2018–2019	→ FC Chertanovo-2 Moscow	1	(0)
2021–2023	FC Salyut Belgorod	61	(14)
2023–2024	FC Dynamo Bryansk	15	(0)
2024–	FC Salyut Belgorod	69	(8)

International career
2013	Russia U-16	1	(0)
- * Club domestic league appearances and goals as of 31 October 2026

Aleksandr Ruslanovich Kanishchev (Russian: Александр Русланович Канищев; born 16 January 1998) is a Russian football player who plays for FC Salyut Belgorod.

== Club career ==
He made his debut in the Russian Professional Football League for FC Chertanovo Moscow on 21 September 2015 in a game against FC Vityaz Podolsk. He made his Russian Football National League debut for Chertanovo on 10 November 2018 in a game against FC Armavir.
