= FC Dynamo Vladivostok =

Russian football team based in Vladivostok

- Full name: Football Club Dynamo Vladivostok
- Founded: 1944; 82 years ago
- Ground: Dynamo Stadium
- Capacity: 10,200
- Chairman: Aleksandra Kinyak
- Manager: Konstantin Dzutsev
- League: Russian Second League, Division A, Gold Group
- 2025–26: Second stage: Silver Group, 4th
- Website: fcdynamo25.ru

FC Dynamo Vladivostok (Russian: ФК «Динамо» Владивосток) is a Russian football team from Vladivostok. They play their home games at the 10,200-capacity Dynamo Stadium.

== Club history ==
Dynamo played on the amateur level for most of its history, with the exception of second-tier 1957 Soviet Class B participation. The club was also dissolved and recreated several times.

In 2021, it was recreated once more and was licensed for the third-tier Russian FNL 2 for the 2021–22 season.

FC Luch Vladivostok represented the city in the Russian Premier League previously, before going bankrupt in 2020.

== Current squad ==
As of 11 September 2026, according to the Second League website.

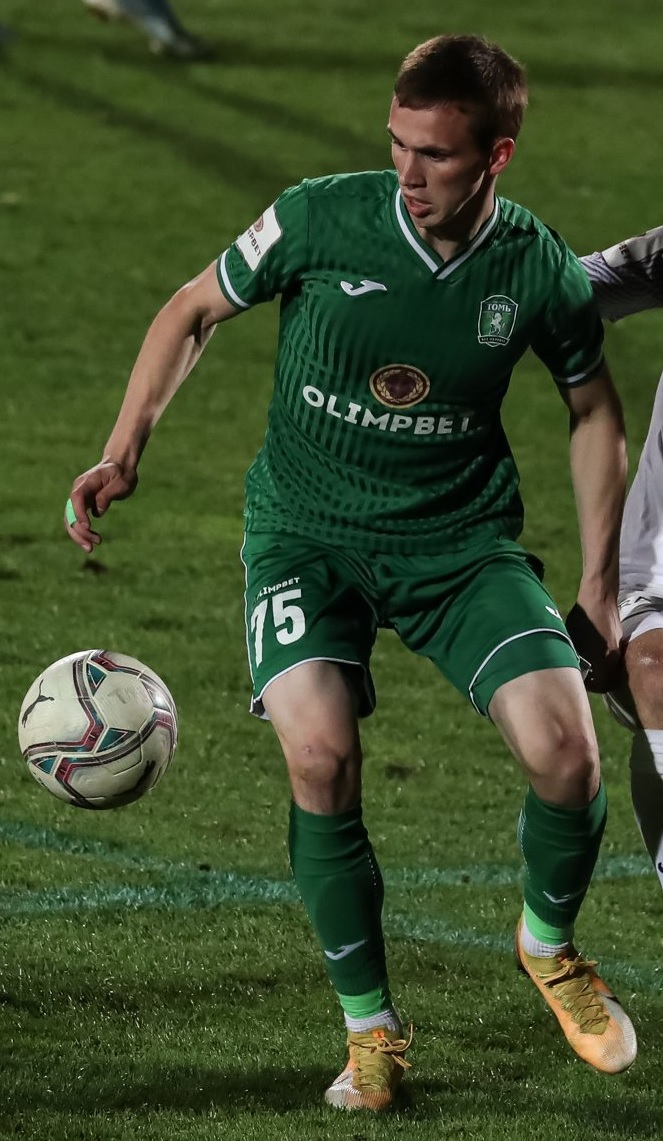
Oleg Leonov joined Dynamo Vladivostok in 2024

Note: Flags indicate national team as defined under FIFA eligibility rules; some limited exceptions apply. Players may hold more than one non-FIFA nationality.

No.	Pos.	Nation	Player
4	DF	RUS	Yevgeni Steshin
5	DF	RUS	Nikita Sergeyev
6	MF	RUS	Aleksey Amelin
7	MF	RUS	Dmitry Rashchupkin
8	FW	RUS	Nikolay Sukhanov
9	FW	RUS	Yevgeni Pesikov
10	MF	RUS	Nikita Kasatkin
11	FW	RUS	Daur Kvekveskiri
12	GK	RUS	Yevgeny Gryaznov
13	MF	RUS	Valeri Pochivalin
16	GK	RUS	Andrey Kulagin
17	MF	RUS	David Bolatayev
19	MF	RUS	Maksim Mashnyov
23	GK	RUS	Maksim Pechenkin

No.	Pos.	Nation	Player
24	DF	RUS	Timofey Koshkarov
27	DF	RUS	Sergey Alekseyev
28	DF	RUS	Andrei Semyonov
36	DF	RUS	Artyom Voropayev
40	DF	RUS	Dmitry Burkin
44	DF	RUS	Artyom Yapryntsev
45	MF	RUS	Artyom Brovkin
47	DF	RUS	Timur Nikolayev
71	MF	RUS	Yegor Gurenko (on loan from Nizhny Novgorod)
77	FW	RUS	Eduard Boyarashnikov
79	DF	RUS	Daniil Antsiperov (on loan from Orenburg)
91	FW	RUS	Sergei Gribov
98	MF	RUS	Ignat Polishchuk
99	FW	RUS	Nikita Rozhkov
