= 2025–26 Russian Cup =

2025–26 Fonbet Russian Cup

Tournament details
- Country: Russia
- Teams: 104

Final positions
- Champions: Spartak Moscow
- Runners-up: Krasnodar

The 2025–26 Russian Cup was the 34th season of the Russian football knockout tournament since the dissolution of the Soviet Union. The competition started on 29 July 2025 and concluded on 24 May 2026.

The winner of the cup would normally gain entry into the 2026–27 UEFA Europa League; however, on 28 February 2022, Russian football clubs were suspended from FIFA & UEFA international competitions until further notice due to the Russian invasion of Ukraine.

== Representation of clubs by league ==
- Russian Premier League (1): 16 clubs
- Russian First League (2): 18 clubs
- Division A of Russian Second League (3): 16 clubs (without 2 farm teams)
- Division B of Russian Second League (4): 39 clubs (without 17 farm teams and 2 Crimean teams)
- Amateur leagues:
  - Third division (5): 12 clubs
  - Fourth division (regional leagues) (6): 0 clubs
  - Media amateur clubs (7): 3 clubs
- Total: 104 clubs.

== Distribution ==
The teams of Premier League and the other teams will qualify to knockout phase in two different paths. Premier league teams will play in the RPL path group stage with a double round-robin tournament, divided into 4 groups with 4 teams in each group, while the other teams will play in the regions path qualification, starting with 1/256 round until 1/8 round with 1 match in each stage.

== Schedule ==
The schedule of the competition is as follows:

Phase	Round			Match date
Qualifying rounds (regions path)	Round 1			5–7 August 2025
Qualifying rounds (regions path)	Round 2			19–21 August 2025
Qualifying rounds (regions path)	Round 3			9–11 September 2025
Qualifying rounds (regions path)	Round 4			23–25 September 2025
Qualifying rounds (regions path)	Round 5			14–16 October 2025
Qualifying rounds (regions path)	Round 6			28–30 October 2025
Group stage (RPL path)	Matchday 1			29–31 July 2025
Group stage (RPL path)	Matchday 2			12–14 August 2025
Group stage (RPL path)	Matchday 3			26–28 August 2025
Group stage (RPL path)	Matchday 4			16–18 September 2025
Group stage (RPL path)	Matchday 5			30 September – 2 October 2025
Group stage (RPL path)	Matchday 6			21–23 October 2025
Knockout stage	Quarter-finals	RPL path	Match 1	4–6 November 2025
Knockout stage	Quarter-finals	RPL path	Match 2	25–27 November 2025
Knockout stage	Quarter-finals	Regions path	Stage 1	25–27 November 2025
Knockout stage	Quarter-finals	Regions path	Stage 2	3–5 March 2026
Knockout stage	Semi-finals	RPL path	Match 1	3–5 March 2026
Knockout stage	Semi-finals	RPL path	Match 2	17–19 March 2026
Knockout stage	Semi-finals	Regions path	Stage 1	17–19 March 2026
Knockout stage	Semi-finals	Regions path	Stage 2	7–9 April 2026
Knockout stage	Path finals	RPL path	Match 1	8 April 2026
Knockout stage	Path finals	RPL path	Match 2	7 May 2026
Knockout stage	Path finals	Regions path		6 May 2026
Knockout stage	Final			24 May 2026

== Qualifying round (regions path) ==
The draw for all rounds in regions path was held on 29 June 2025.

=== Round 1 ===
Entered clubs:

- 15 clubs from Amateur leagues
- 13 lowest clubs from Russian Second League Division B

Date of matches was determined on 5–7 August 2025.

Times are MSK (UTC+3), as listed by RFU (local times, if different, are in parentheses).

5 August 2025	RWChallenge Saint Petersburg (5)	0–3 (awd.) (Note: Zvezda defeated RWChallenge 1–4. However, in 13 March 2026, the RFS Control and Disciplinary Committee was declared about fixed the match. The game was awarded 0–3 to Zvezda.)	Zvezda Saint Petersburg (4)	Saint-Petersburg
16:00	Sholokh 90+1'	Report	Rulyov 13'; Smirnov 38', 81'; Kopitets 45+1'	Stadium: Nova Arena Stadium; Attendance: 190; Referee: Roman Marnavskiy

5 August 2025	Amkal Moscow (7)	3–1	Kvant Obninsk (4)	Krasnogorsk
18:00	Paradeev 7'; Alekseev 19'; Prokopjev 90+5'	Report	Demidov 39'	Stadium: Zorky Stadium; Attendance: 1,545; Referee: Daniil Logvinov

5 August 2025	Shumbrat Saransk (5)	1–3	Kristall-MEZT Borisoglebsk (5)	Saransk
20:15	Karpov 51'	Report	Sapelnikov 26'; Altukhov 57'; Bednozhey 68'	Stadium: Mordovia Arena; Attendance: 17,338; Referee: Pavel Klipikov

6 August 2025	Krasnoye Znamya Noginsk (5)	3–0	Kolomna (4)	Noginsk
16:00	Kashperskiy 42'; Barinov 74' (o.g.); Lebedev 83'	Report	Rendakov (red card) 66'	Stadium: Znamya Stadium; Attendance: 300; Referee: Dmitriy Matveev

6 August 2025	Ilpar Perm Krai (5)	3–2	Nosta Novotroitsk (4)	Perm
16:00 (18:00 YEKT)	Chebykin 10'; Zaytsev 27'; Paramonov (penalty missed) 85' (red card) 89'	Report	Vainer 29', 37'; Nelyubov (red card) 89'	Stadium: Zvezda Stadium; Attendance: 526; Referee: Vladislav Demyanchuk

6 August 2025	PSK Dinskaya (5)	1–1 (10–9 p)	Druzhba Maykop (4)	Dinskaya
17:00	Nechaev 45'	Report	Ragulkin 27'	Stadium: Kuban Central Stadium; Attendance: 1,007; Referee: Oleg Gusakov
	Penalties
	Pshenichnikov (penalty missed); Mikhailov (penalty scored); Kolobov (penalty scored); Zhokhov (penalty scored); Fedoseev (penalty scored); Kozenov (penalty missed); Punegov (penalty scored); Vorotnikov (penalty scored); Zhirnov (penalty scored); Taranda (penalty scored); Panev (penalty scored); Pshenichnikov (penalty scored)		(penalty scored) Malkanduyev; (penalty scored) Abdullayev; (penalty scored) Yushko; (penalty missed) Ragulkin; (penalty scored) Tsanava; (penalty missed) Magomedbekov; (penalty scored) Cherdzhiyev; (penalty scored) Gadzhimagomedov; (penalty scored) Trefilov; (penalty scored) Khakhov; (penalty scored) Vertiyev; (penalty missed) Malkanduyev

6 August 2025	SSH-Leningradets Leningrad Oblast (5)	0–3	Cherepovets (4)	Roshchino
18:00	Ryasskiy (yellow card) 35' (yellow-red card) 46'	Report	Balashov 48', 58'; Antsiferov 89'	Stadium: Roshchino Arena Stadium; Attendance: 231; Referee: Evgeniy Sedov

6 August 2025	Broke Boys Moscow (7)	3–2	Oryol (4)	Orekhovo-Zuyevo
18:00	Mayrovich 29'; Anisimov 74'; Mazurov 83'	Report	Luksha 55' (yellow card) 77' (yellow-red card) 90+4'; Gogrichiani 70'	Stadium: Znamya Truda Stadium; Attendance: 1,750; Referee: Ivan Gerasimov

6 August 2025	2DROTS Moscow (7)	1–0	Torpedo Vladimir (4)	Moscow
20:15	Fartuna 90+4'	Report		Stadium: Moskvich Stadium; Attendance: 3,071; Referee: Stanislav Brashchin

7 August 2025	Anri Vladivostok (5)	0–4	KDV Tomsk (4)	Vladivostok
12:30 (19:30 VLAT)		Report	Stepanenko 40'; Simdyankin 49'; Kondrakov 59'; Starodub 73'	Stadium: Dynamo Stadium; Attendance: 897; Referee: Maksim Skorochkin

7 August 2025	Buryatia Ulan-Ude (5)	0–8	Irkutsk (4)	Ulan-Ude
13:30 (18:30 IRKT)		Report	Yakovlev 3', 33', 76'; Putilov 7', 55'; Perevoznikov 20', 35'; Lutashev 68'	Stadium: Zabaikalets Stadium; Attendance: 750; Referee: Vitali Evdokimov

7 August 2025	Temp Barnaul (5)	2–2 (3–1 p)	Uralets-TS Nizhny Tagil (4)	Barnaul
15:00 (19:00 KRAT)	Zavyalov 44'; Vorona 90+2'	Report	Burykin 41'; Lauk 42'	Stadium: Dynamo Stadium; Attendance: 3,001; Referee: Artem Petrenko
	Penalties
	Vorona (penalty scored); Khugaev (penalty scored); Shibaev (penalty scored)		(penalty missed) Chuvilov; (penalty missed) Krotov; (penalty scored) Antipov; (penalty missed) Smolnikov

7 August 2025	SSHOR 1-Kristall Saint Petersburg (5)	1–3	Luki-Energiya Velikiye Luki (4)	Saint-Petersburg
17:15	Kombarov 87'	Report	Korenblyum 45+1'; Butakov 52'; Strebtsov 90+3'	Stadium: Nova Arena Stadium; Attendance: 440; Referee: Nikita Morozov

Fankom Kirov (5)	Cancelled	Sokol Kazan (4) (Note: Sokol's sports director Ilyas Minnevaliyev stated that due to financial problems, the team will play its last match in the Second League Division B on July 6 against Krylia Sovetov-2, after which the club will be dissolved. On 15 July, the club was confirmed that it was withdraw from cup competition.)

=== Round 2 ===
Entered clubs:

- 14 winners of Round 1
- 26 highest clubs from Russian Second League Division B
- 16 clubs from Russian Second League Division A

Date of matches was determined on 19–21 August 2025.

Times are MSK (UTC+3), as listed by RFU (local times, if different, are in parentheses).

19 August 2025	Irtysh Omsk (3)	0–0 (2–4 p)	Temp Barnaul (5)	Omsk
15:00 (18:00 OMST)		Report		Stadium: Red Star Stadium; Attendance: 1,939; Referee: Artem Smolin
	Penalties
	Yanushkovsky (penalty scored); Yanchenko (penalty missed); Shokhin (penalty scored); Sadykov (penalty missed)		(penalty scored) Vorona; (penalty scored) Khugaev; (penalty scored) Shibaev; (penalty scored) Vernigor

19 August 2025	Salyut Belgorod (4)	3–0	Ryazan (4)	Stary Oskol
16:00	Shilov 38'; Vinnikov 56'; Ponomaryov 64'	Report		Stadium: Spartak Stadium; Attendance: 345; Referee: Viktor Latsviev

19 August 2025	Kaluga (3)	0–1	Amkal Moscow (7)	Kaluga
17:00		Report	Papikyan 41'	Stadium: Sputnik Stadium; Attendance: 698; Referee: Sergey Fedotov

19 August 2025	Kuban-Holding Pavlovskaya (4)	0–0 (4–3 p)	Nart Cherkessk (4)	Pavlovskaya
17:00		Report	Lelyukayev (red card) 56'	Stadium: Urozhay Stadium; Attendance: 430; Referee: Davud Magomedov
	Penalties
	Garayev (penalty scored); Popov (penalty scored); Sapozhnikov (penalty scored); Fadeyev (penalty scored)		(penalty scored) Panayev; (penalty scored) Kuskov; (penalty scored) Kurbanov; (penalty missed) Davlitgereyev; (penalty missed) Olenev

19 August 2025	Kuban Krasnodar (3)	1–2	PSK Dinskaya (5)	Krasnodar
18:30	Molteninov 83'	Report	Pshenichnikov 13'; Fedoseev 40'	Stadium: Kuban Stadium; Attendance: 1,612; Referee: Danil Naboka

19 August 2025	Dynamo Stavropol (4)	1–1 (3–1 p)	Angusht Nazran (4)	Stavropol
19:15	Makoyev 90+5'	Report	Ulbashev 81'	Stadium: Dynamo Stadium; Attendance: 870; Referee: Vladislav Shipkov
	Penalties
	Akhyadov (penalty scored); Yagyayev (penalty scored); Kashtan (penalty scored)		(penalty missed) Chaadayev; (penalty missed) Ulbashev; (penalty scored) Girzishev; (penalty missed) Yusupov

19 August 2025	Spartak Tambov (4)	2–1	Metallurg Lipetsk (4)	Tambov
19:15	Bzikadze 19'; Maloletov 67'	Report	Chernyakov 74'	Stadium: Spartak Stadium; Attendance: 1,505; Referee: Aleksey Koltunov

20 August 2025	KDV Tomsk (4)	3–0	Dynamo Vladivostok (3)	Tomsk
13:00 (17:00 KRAT)	Paliyenko 59'; Stepanenko 62'; Kondrakov 83'	Report	Korotkikh (yellow card) 38' (yellow-red card) 58'	Stadium: Temp Stadium; Attendance: 2,000; Referee: Yuriy Matveev

20 August 2025	Legion Makhachkala (4)	2–2 (4–3 p)	Alania Vladikavkaz (3)	Makhachkala
16:00	Kurbanaliyev 5', 74'	Report	Dzestelov 60'; Chertkoyev 90'	Stadium: Yelena Isinbayeva Stadium; Attendance: 350; Referee: Andrey Zubov
	Penalties
	Gasanov (penalty missed); Ibragimov (penalty scored); Tokayev (penalty scored); Krasnov (penalty scored); Kotov (penalty missed); Yeryomin (penalty scored)		(penalty missed) Dibirov; (penalty missed) Stanisavljevic; (penalty scored) Chertkoyev; (penalty scored) Khidiyev; (penalty scored) Ibragimov; (penalty missed) Karkuzayev

20 August 2025	Zenit Penza (4)	1–0	Strogino Moscow (4)	Penza
16:00	Kashitsyn 16'	Report		Stadium: Zenit Stadium; Attendance: 217; Referee: Dmitriy Prokopov

20 August 2025	Astrakhan (4)	1–0	Pobeda Khasavyurt (4)	Astrakhan
16:00 (17:00 SAMT)	Zlobin 90+4'	Report	Abulashov (red card) 62'	Stadium: Aleksandr Kolosov Stadium; Attendance: 565; Referee: Georgiy Musienko

20 August 2025	Torpedo Miass (3)	0–0 (3–5 p)	Volna Nizhny Novgorod Oblast (4)	Miass
16:00 (18:00 YEKT)		Report		Stadium: Trud Stadium; Attendance: 350; Referee: Vage Chichilyan
	Penalties
	Kuzmin (penalty missed); Borisenko (penalty scored); Rubanov (penalty scored); Fedosyuk (penalty scored)		(penalty scored) O. Volkov; (penalty scored) Voronov; (penalty scored) A. Volkov; (penalty scored) Pozdnyakov; (penalty scored) Zabotkin

20 August 2025	Kosmos Dolgoprudny (4)	1–0	2DROTS Moscow (7)	Dolgoprudny
17:00	Matvevnin 61'; Gavrilov (yellow card) 88' (yellow-red card) 90'	Report	Fartuna (red card) 39'	Stadium: Salyut Stadium; Attendance: 1,984; Referee: Egor Kurakin

20 August 2025	Cherepovets (4)	2–1	Zvezda Saint Petersburg (4)	Cherepovets
17:00	Antsiferov 7'; Andreyev 32' (pen.)	Report	Mikhaylovsky 65'	Stadium: Metallurg Stadium; Attendance: 500; Referee: Sergey Osipov

20 August 2025	Khimik Dzerzhinsk (4)	1–1 (5–3 p)	Amkar Perm (4)	Dzerzhinsk
17:00	Doronin 89'	Report	Korolkov 83'	Stadium: Khimik Stadium; Attendance: 1,450; Referee: Vladislav Kharitonov
	Penalties
	Savinov (penalty scored); Veber (penalty scored); Trofimov (penalty scored); Plotnikov (penalty scored); Gruznov (penalty scored)		(penalty scored) Zuyev; (penalty scored) Kotik; (penalty scored) Kalayda; (penalty missed) Myrzakov

20 August 2025	Luki-Energiya Velikiye Luki (4)	2–0	Leningradets Leningrad Oblast (3)	Velikiye Luki
17:00	Polyakov 23' (pen.); Korenblyum 45+2'	Report	Mikushin (yellow card) 5' (yellow-red card) 27'	Stadium: Ekspress Stadium; Attendance: 725; Referee: Dmitriy Kraynov

20 August 2025	Mashuk-KMV Pyatigorsk (3)	0–0 (4–2 p)	Spartak Nalchik (4)	Pyatigorsk
17:00		Report		Stadium: Central Stadium; Attendance: 780; Referee: Oleg Gusakov
	Penalties
	Torosyan (penalty scored); Abakarov (penalty scored); Selemenev (penalty scored); Saygushev (penalty missed); Abazov (penalty scored)		(penalty scored) Kenzhev; (penalty missed) Kadykoyev; (penalty missed) Goguzokov; (penalty scored) Pekov

20 August 2025	Veles Moscow (3)	2–0	Krasnoye Znamya Noginsk (5)	Podolsk
18:00	Kistenyov 75' (pen.); Rybalko 82'	Report		Stadium: Trud Stadium; Attendance: 187; Referee: Danila Tsurkov

20 August 2025	Dynamo Bryansk (4)	0–0 (2–3 p)	Saturn Ramenskoye (4)	Bryansk
18:00		Report		Stadium: Dynamo Stadium; Attendance: 2,440; Referee: Andrey Meshkov
	Penalties
	Pikatov (penalty missed); Solovyov (penalty missed); Medvedev (penalty missed); Drogunov (penalty scored); Alyokhin (penalty scored)		(penalty scored) Sosranov; (penalty missed) Voytsekhovskiy; (penalty missed) Kratkov; (penalty scored) Dunay; (penalty scored) Biryukov

20 August 2025	Dynamo Kirov (3)	1–1 (12–13 p)	Fankom Kirov (5)	Kirov
18:30	Usov 32'	Report	Sichkar 35'	Stadium: VyatSShOR Stadium; Attendance: 1,450; Referee: Vladimir Sivkov
	Penalties
	Usov (penalty scored); Nagovitsin (penalty scored); Kamayev (penalty scored); Malykh (penalty scored); Bochko (penalty scored); Zakharov (penalty scored); Filippov (penalty scored); Teplyakov (penalty scored); Pasko (penalty scored); Omarov (penalty scored); Yeremeyev (penalty scored); Usov (penalty scored); Nagovitsin (penalty missed)		(penalty scored) Pirmamedov; (penalty scored) Spirin; (penalty scored) Pleshko; (penalty scored) Dudkin; (penalty scored) Matviychuk; (penalty scored) Fedchuk; (penalty scored) Andrianov; (penalty scored) Shabalin; (penalty scored) Vasiljev; (penalty scored) Drozdov; (penalty scored) Frolkin; (penalty scored) Pirmamedov; (penalty scored) Spirin

20 August 2025	Znamya Truda Orekhovo-Zuyevo (4)	2–1	Dynamo Barnaul (4)	Orekhovo-Zuyevo
18:30	Agalakov 9'; Morozov 85'	Report	Mikhailin 57'	Stadium: Znamya Truda Stadium; Attendance: 839; Referee: Mikhail Yakovlev

20 August 2025	Kristall-MEZT Borisoglebsk (5)	3–2	Murom (3)	Voronezh
19:00	Pospelov 17'; Sapelnikov 43'; Kolpakov 65'	Report	Ivakhnov 1', 33'	Stadium: Fakel Stadium; Attendance: 3,251; Referee: Pavel Shishkin

20 August 2025	Volgar Astrakhan (3)	2–1	Chertanovo Moscow (4)	Astrakhan
19:15 (20:15 SAMT)	Lesnikov 38'; Zuyev 66'	Report	Khomyakov 3'	Stadium: Central Stadium; Attendance: 6,183; Referee: Efim Rubtsov

20 August 2025	Dynamo Vologda (4)	1–0	Dynamo Saint Petersburg (4)	Vologda
19:15	Spodarets 14'	Report		Stadium: Dynamo Stadium; Attendance: 1,927; Referee: Maksim Sukhanov

21 August 2025	Irkutsk (4)	2–0	Sibir Novosibirsk (3)	Cheremkhovo
12:30 (17:30 IRKT)	Putilov 36', 78'	Report		Stadium: Shakhter Stadium (Note: Irkutsk played their Russian Cup home match at the Shakhter Stadium, in Cheremkhovo, instead of their regular venue, the Trud Stadium, in Irkutsk.); Attendance: 442; Referee: Maksim Skorochkin

21 August 2025	Avangard Kursk (3)	1–2	Broke Boys Moscow (7)	Oryol
17:00	Ignatenko 7'	Report	Smolov 46'; Levkin 73'	Stadium: Central Stadium (Note: Avangard played their Russian Cup home match at the Central Stadium, in Oryol, instead of their regular venue, the Trudovye Rezervy Stadium, in Kursk, due to different problems, related to Russian invasion of Ukraine.); Attendance: 2,870; Referee: Evgeniy Timofeev

21 August 2025	Tyumen (3)	4–1	Ilpar Perm Krai (5)	Tyumen
17:00 (19:00 YEKT)	Bem 48', 90+1'; Bykovsky 57'; Abakumov 75'	Report	Melekhov 88'	Stadium: Geolog Stadium; Attendance: 1,842; Referee: Aleksandr Mayun

21 August 2025	Tekstilshchik Ivanovo (3)	0–0 (5–4 p)	Tver (4)	Ivanovo
19:15		Report		Stadium: Tekstilshchik Stadium; Attendance: 4,993; Referee: Pavel Lysenko
	Penalties
	Bammatgereyev (penalty scored); Polyakov (penalty scored); Azarov (penalty scored); Noskov (penalty scored); Klementyev (penalty scored)		(penalty scored) Ionov; (penalty scored) Korneyev; (penalty scored) Pankov; (penalty missed) Abdulkin; (penalty scored) Shevtsov

=== Round 3 ===
Entered clubs:

- 28 winners of Round 2

Date of matches was determined on 9–11 September 2025.

Times are MSK (UTC+3), as listed by RFU (local times, if different, are in parentheses).

9 September 2025	Astrakhan (4)	5–2	Legion Makhachkala (4)	Astrakhan
15:30 (16:30 SAMT)	Patcho 10' (pen.), 90+1'; Zolotorenko 15'; Levchenkov 19'; Karpov 21'	Report	Krasnov 30'; Alim 40'	Stadium: Aleksandr Kolosov Stadium; Attendance: 586; Referee: Daniil Logvinov

10 September 2025	Temp Barnaul (5)	0–1	Znamya Truda Orekhovo-Zuyevo (4)	Barnaul
13:00 (17:00 KRAT)		Report	Morozov 90+2' (pen.)	Stadium: Alexei Smertin SSH Stadium; Attendance: 900; Referee: Nikita Chetkin

10 September 2025	Kosmos Dolgoprudny (4)	1–4	Veles Moscow (3)	Dolgoprudny
14:30	Logachyov 65'	Report	Lapinsky 5', 82'; Popov 22', 45'	Stadium: Salyut Stadium; Attendance: 285; Referee: Oleg Gusakov

10 September 2025	Zenit Penza (4)	0–1	Volgar Astrakhan (3)	Penza
16:00		Report	Dmitriyev 82'	Stadium: Zenit Stadium; Attendance: 300; Referee: Yuriy Matveev

10 September 2025	Volna Nizhny Novgorod Oblast (4)	1–1 (4–3 p)	Tyumen (3)	Zavolzhye
16:00	Mukhin 38'	Report	Shitov 36'	Stadium: Zavolzhsky PCHC Stadium; Attendance: 413; Referee: Danila Tsurkov
	Penalties
	Pozdnyakov (penalty scored); Chechyotkin (penalty scored); Volkov (penalty scored); Mutaliyev (penalty missed); Zabotkin (penalty scored)		(penalty missed) Bolov; (penalty missed) Mokayev; (penalty scored) Pyatkin; (penalty scored) Lavrenkov; (penalty scored) Talikin

10 September 2025	PSK Dinskaya (5)	2–1	Dynamo Stavropol (4)	Dinskaya
16:00	Fedoseev 12'; Nechaev 74'	Report	Suanov 27' (pen.)	Stadium: Kuban Central Stadium; Attendance: 910; Referee: Davud Magomedov

10 September 2025	Luki-Energiya Velikiye Luki (4)	2–4	Cherepovets (4)	Velikiye Luki
17:00	Butakov 23'; Lunyov 78'	Report	Antsiferov 44'; Yamlikhanov 55'; Kopylov 66'; Andreyev 84'	Stadium: Ekspress Stadium; Attendance: 782; Referee: Roman Marnavskiy

10 September 2025	Tekstilshchik Ivanovo (3)	1–1 (2–0 p)	Dynamo Vologda (4)	Ivanovo
17:00	Noskov 68'	Report	Dolgov 55'	Stadium: Tekstilshchik Stadium; Attendance: 1,560; Referee: Evgeniy Timofeev
	Penalties
	Tatarinov (penalty scored); Polyakov (penalty scored); Kvekveskiri (penalty missed)		(penalty missed) Kireyev; (penalty missed) Petrolay; (penalty missed) Sarsenov; (penalty missed) Gioyev

10 September 2025	Mashuk-KMV Pyatigorsk (3)	0–3	Kuban-Holding Pavlovskaya (4)	Pyatigorsk
17:00	Saidov (red card) 41'	Report	Khagur 14' (o.g.); Zakharov 21'; Kartashov 65'	Stadium: Central Stadium; Attendance: 270; Referee: Pavel Lysenko

10 September 2025	Fankom Kirov (5)	0–0 (4–3 p)	Khimik Dzerzhinsk (4)	Kirov
18:00		Report		Stadium: VyatSShOR Stadium; Attendance: 723; Referee: Aleksandr Anufriev
	Penalties
	Rodionov (penalty missed); Malaniya (penalty scored); Sichkar (penalty scored); Gaidukov (penalty scored); Ivashchov (penalty scored)		(penalty scored) Merenchukov; (penalty scored) Veber; (penalty scored) Gordeyev; (penalty missed) Plotnikov; (penalty missed) Savinov

10 September 2025	Kristall-MEZT Borisoglebsk (5)	1–0	Spartak Tambov (4)	Voronezh
19:30	Nartov 70'	Report		Stadium: Fakel Stadium; Attendance: 6,735; Referee: Georgiy Musienko

11 September 2025	Irkutsk (4)	3–0	KDV Tomsk (4)	Cheremkhovo
12:00 (17:00 IRKT)	Yakovlev 63'; Belyayev 73'; Mashnyov 84'	Report		Stadium: Shakhter Stadium; Attendance: 2,013; Referee: Ivan Pozhidaev

11 September 2025	Amkal Moscow (7)	2–1	Salyut Belgorod (4)	Krasnogorsk
17:00	Papikyan 43'; Sabua 75'	Report	Boyarkin 31'; Krikunenko (yellow card) 36' (yellow-red card) 85'	Stadium: Zorky Stadium; Attendance: 530; Referee: Pavel Klipikov

11 September 2025	Saturn Ramenskoye (4)	0–2	Broke Boys Moscow (7)	Ramenskoye
19:30		Report	Smolov 64'; Ari 90+6'	Stadium: Leon Arena Stadium; Attendance: 4,200; Referee: Sergey Osipov

=== Round 4 ===
Entered clubs:

- 14 winners of Round 3
- 18 clubs from Russian First League

The draw was consisted of 2 phases. On the first phase, 2 random balls with First League team from pot 2 was relocated to pot 1, then on the second phase usual draw procedure started.

Pot 1	Pot 2
Amkal Moscow (7); Astrakhan (4); Broke Boys Moscow (7); Cherepovets (4); Fankom Kirov (5); Irkutsk (4); KAMAZ Naberezhnye Chelny (2); Kristall-MEZT Borisoglebsk (5); Kuban-Holding Pavlovskaya (4); PSK Dinskaya (5); SKA-Khabarovsk (2); Tekstilshchik Ivanovo (3); Veles Moscow (3); Volgar Astrakhan (3); Volna Nizhny Novgorod Oblast (4); Znamya Truda Orekhovo-Zuyevo (4)	Arsenal Tula (2); Chayka Peschanokopskoye (2); Chelyabinsk (2); Chernomorets Novorossiysk (2); Fakel Voronezh (2); KAMAZ Naberezhnye Chelny (2) → Pot 1; Neftekhimik Nizhnekamsk (2); Rodina Moscow (2); Rotor Volgograd (2); Shinnik Yaroslavl (2); SKA-Khabarovsk (2) → Pot 1; Sokol Saratov (2); Spartak Kostroma (2); Torpedo Moscow (2); Ufa (2); Ural Yekaterinburg (2); Volga Ulyanovsk (2); Yenisey Krasnoyarsk (2)

The team from pot 2 that was relocated to pot 1 is written in italics. The team was unknown until it will be drawn from pot 1.

Times are MSK (UTC+3), as listed by RFU (local times, if different, are in parentheses).

23 September 2025	PSK Dinskaya (5)	1–2	Ural Yekaterinburg (2)	Dinskaya
15:00	Kozenov 39'	Report	Morozov 30'; Bondarev 35'	Stadium: Kuban Central Stadium; Attendance: 1,008; Referee: Oleg Gusakov

23 September 2025	Broke Boys Moscow (7)	0–2	Sokol Saratov (2)	Krasnogorsk
19:30	Korobov (red card) 68'	Report	Dolya 17'; Gloydman 50'	Stadium: Zorky Stadium; Attendance: 717; Referee: Maksim Skorochkin

24 September 2025	SKA-Khabarovsk (2)	0–3	Rodina Moscow (2)	Khabarovsk
12:00 (19:00 VLAT)		Report	Koryan 2'; Knyazev 11'; Markitesov 42'	Stadium: Lenin Stadium; Attendance: 1,017; Referee: Anton Anopa

24 September 2025	Astrakhan (4)	0–2	Chernomorets Novorossiysk (2)	Astrakhan
14:00 (15:00 SAMT)		Report	Lozhkin 12'; Sutugin 64'	Stadium: Aleksandr Kolosov Stadium; Attendance: 242; Referee: Yuriy Matveev

24 September 2025	Veles Moscow (3)	2–1	Rotor Volgograd (2)	Podolsk
14:30	Kovalkov 19'; Geloyan 73'	Report	Lavrishchev 22'	Stadium: Trud Stadium; Attendance: 421; Referee: Andrey Prokopov

24 September 2025	Kuban-Holding Pavlovskaya (4)	2–2 (8–7 p)	Volga Ulyanovsk (2)	Pavlovskaya
15:00	Popov 10'; Mikhaylov 56'	Report	Yakovlev 48'; Kamenshchikov 50'	Stadium: Urozhay Stadium; Attendance: 740; Referee: Matvey Zaika
	Penalties
	Garayev (penalty missed); Fadeyev (penalty scored); Solovyov (penalty scored); Kartashov (penalty scored); Orazayev (penalty scored); Vitulin (penalty scored); Dashayev (penalty scored); Zakharov (penalty scored); Babayan (penalty scored)		(penalty scored) Kamenshchikov; (penalty scored) Kasyanov; (penalty missed) Murza; (penalty scored) Gershun; (penalty scored) Yakovlev; (penalty scored) Rakhmanov; (penalty scored) Larionov; (penalty scored) Kozlov; (penalty missed) Kovalyov

24 September 2025	Cherepovets (4)	1–4	Shinnik Yaroslavl (2)	Cherepovets
16:00	Balashov 52'	Report	Porokhov 39'; Stefanovich 73', 84'; Shipunov 90+1'	Stadium: Metallurg Stadium; Attendance: 528; Referee: Artem Kharin

24 September 2025	Volgar Astrakhan (3)	1–1 (2–4 p)	Neftekhimik Nizhnekamsk (2)	Astrakhan
17:00 (18:00 SAMT)	Lesnikov 34'	Report	Mashukov 38'	Stadium: Central Stadium; Attendance: 7,103; Referee: Mikhail Plisko
	Penalties
	Nasibov (penalty scored); Pavlishin (penalty scored); Adayev (penalty missed); Petrovsky (penalty missed)		(penalty scored) Mashukov; (penalty missed) Shiltsov; (penalty scored) Shadrintsev; (penalty scored) Bobyor; (penalty scored) Sukhomlinov

24 September 2025	Fankom Kirov (5)	0–3 (awd.) (Note: Fankom defeated Ufa in a penalty shootout following a 1–1 draw, however the game was awarded to Ufa after the fact as Fankom fielded Artyom Fedchuk who is banned from official RFU competitions)	Ufa (2)	Kirov
18:00	Shabalin 59'; Sichkar (red card) 73'	Report	Karpuk 71' (pen.)	Stadium: VyatSShOR Stadium; Attendance: 910; Referee: Sergey Fedotov
	Penalties
	Malaniya (penalty scored); Gaidukov (penalty scored); Pleshko (penalty scored); Chezhiya (penalty scored); Rodionov (penalty scored)		(penalty scored) Matskharashvili; (penalty scored) Tenyayev; (penalty scored) Garayev; (penalty missed) Minatulayev

24 September 2025	Znamya Truda Orekhovo-Zuyevo (4)	0–1	Chayka Peschanokopskoye (2)	Orekhovo-Zuyevo
18:30		Report	Sokolov 12' (pen.)	Stadium: Znamya Truda Stadium; Attendance: 1,008; Referee: Artur Sagdiyev

24 September 2025	Kristall-MEZT Borisoglebsk (5)	1–3	Torpedo Moscow (2)	Voronezh
19:00	Nikitin 78'	Report	Shitov 15', 16'; Galoyan 90+1'	Stadium: Fakel Stadium; Attendance: 4,528; Referee: Yefim Rubtsov

24 September 2025	Tekstilshchik Ivanovo (3)	1–1 (1–3 p)	Fakel Voronezh (2)	Ivanovo
19:30	Azarov 13'	Report	Chikhradze 47'	Stadium: Tekstilshchik Stadium; Attendance: 2,730; Referee: Igor Zakharov
	Penalties
	Polyakov (penalty missed); Noskov (penalty scored); Kozlovsky (penalty missed); Anosov (penalty missed)		(penalty missed) Gaponov; (penalty scored) Alshin; (penalty scored) Turishchev; (penalty scored) Abdokov

25 September 2025	Irkutsk (4)	2–3	Chelyabinsk (2)	Irkutsk
14:00 (19:00 IRKT)	Lutashev 2'; Yakovlev 27' (pen.)	Report	Nosov 4' (pen.); Urvantsev 56'; Chemasov 90+2'	Stadium: Trud Stadium; Attendance: 2,532; Referee: Aleksey Lapatukhin

25 September 2025	Amkal Moscow (7)	1–2	Yenisey Krasnoyarsk (2)	Krasnogorsk
17:00	Sabua (yellow card) 61' (yellow-red card) 90'; Samylin 78'	Report	Pogosov 52'; Khashkulov 88'	Stadium: Zorky Stadium; Attendance: 450; Referee: Danil Naboka

25 September 2025	KAMAZ Naberezhnye Chelny (2)	0–0 (5–4 p)	Spartak Kostroma (2)	Naberezhnye Chelny
19:30		Report	Chikanchi (red card) 90'	Stadium: KAMAZ Stadium; Attendance: 5,281; Referee: Igor Kaplenkov
	Penalties
	Motorin (penalty scored); Deryugin (penalty scored); Burko (penalty scored); Solodukhin (penalty scored); Abdullahi (penalty scored)		(penalty scored) Saplinov; (penalty missed) Kudryashov; (penalty scored) Bugriyev; (penalty scored) Nemchenko; (penalty scored) Ignatyev

25 September 2025	Volna Nizhny Novgorod Oblast (4)	0–3	Arsenal Tula (2)	Nizhny Novgorod
20:00		Report	Troshechkin 30'; Avanesyan 34'; Bogdanets 84'	Stadium: Lokomotiv Stadium; Attendance: 623; Referee: Vladimir Sivkov

=== Round 5 ===
Entered clubs:

- 16 winners of Round 4

15 October 2025	Yenisey Krasnoyarsk (2)	1–1 (3–5 p)	Ufa (2)	Krasnoyarsk
14:30 (18:30 KRAT)	Okladnikov 7'	Report	Minatulayev 15'	Stadium: Arena Yenisey; Attendance: 2,387; Referee: Maksim Skorochkin
	Penalties
	Chukanov (penalty scored); Krotov (penalty scored); Ratković (penalty scored); Mazurin (penalty missed)		(penalty scored) Akhatov; (penalty scored) Yusupov; (penalty scored) Baranovsky; (penalty scored) Gystarov; (penalty scored) Ortiz

15 October 2025	Rodina Moscow (2)	0–0 (4–5 p)	Chelyabinsk (2)	Khimki
17:00		Report		Stadium: Arena Khimki; Attendance: 623; Referee: Stanislav Matveyev
	Penalties
	Sokol (penalty scored); Gordyushenko (penalty scored); Koryan (penalty scored); Goglichidze (penalty scored); Musayev (penalty missed); Timoshenko (penalty missed)		(penalty scored) Gadzhimuradov; (penalty missed) Yemelyanov; (penalty scored) Zhamaletdinov; (penalty scored) Gapechkin; (penalty scored) Kochiyev; (penalty scored) Zhirov

15 October 2025	Chayka Peschanokopskoye (2)	1–3	KAMAZ Naberezhnye Chelny (2)	Peschanokopskoye
18:00	Ishchenko 59'; Kombarov (manager) (yellow card) 81' (yellow-red card) 82'	Report	Semyonov 3', 40'; Motorin 90+4'	Stadium: Ivan Chayka Central Stadium; Attendance: 785; Referee: Yaroslav Khromey

16 October 2025	Fakel Voronezh (2)	1–0	Ural Yekaterinburg (2)	Voronezh
	Nuri Abdokov 51'	Report		Stadium: Fakel Stadium; Attendance: 6,753; Referee: Nikita Novikov

15 October 2025	Arsenal Tula (2)	1–0	Sokol Saratov (2)	Tula
	Maksimov 36'	Report		Stadium: Arsenal Stadium; Attendance: 1,506; Referee: Andrey Prokopov

16 October 2025	Chernomorets Novorossiysk (2)	1–2	Kuban-Holding Pavlovskaya (4)	Novorossiysk
	Pomeshkin 72'	Report	Popov 5'; Grechkin 89'	Stadium: Central Stadium; Attendance: 9,633; Referee: Danil Naboka

16 October 2025	Torpedo Moscow (2)	3–0	Veles Moscow (3)	Khimki
	Galoyan 7' (pen.); Bakić 45+2'; Yushin 67'	Report		Stadium: Arena Khimki; Attendance: 763; Referee: Yefim Rubtsov

15 October 2025	Shinnik Yaroslavl (2)	1–1 (3–5 p)	Neftekhimik Nizhnekamsk (2)	Yaroslavl
	Stefanovich 12'	Report	Nikitin 85'	Stadium: Shinnik Stadium; Attendance: 1,456; Referee: Vladimir Shamara
	Penalties
	Gongapshev (penalty scored); Stefanovich (penalty scored); Artyom Malakhov (penalty scored); Golubev (penalty missed)		(penalty scored) Mashukov; (penalty scored) Nikitin; (penalty scored) Kuchugura; (penalty scored) Bobyor; (penalty scored) Sukhomlinov

=== Round 6 ===
Entered clubs:

- 8 winners of Round 5

28 October 2025	Chelyabinsk (2)	0–0 (3–4 p)	KAMAZ Naberezhnye Chelny (2)	Chelyabinsk
		Report		Stadium: Central Stadium; Attendance: 3,875; Referee: Andrey Prokopov
	Penalties
	Gadzhimuradov (penalty scored); Nosov (penalty scored); Zhamaletdinov (penalty scored); Levin (penalty missed); Kochiyev (penalty missed)		(penalty scored) Khubayev; (penalty scored) Deryugin; (penalty missed) Burko; (penalty scored) Karaev; (penalty scored) Yudintsev

29 October 2025	Torpedo Moscow (2)	1–1 (3–1 p)	Kuban-Holding Pavlovskaya (4)	Khimki
	Shitov 21'	Report	Dmitriyev 75' (pen.)	Stadium: Arena Khimki; Attendance: 683; Referee: Oleg Gusakov
	Penalties
	Danilin (penalty missed); Galoyan (penalty scored); Ćurić (penalty scored); Chupayov (penalty scored)		(penalty missed) Garayev; (penalty missed) Tagiyev; (penalty scored) Sapozhnikov; (penalty missed) Mikhaylov

30 October 2025	Ufa (2)	1–1 (1–3 p)	Neftekhimik Nizhnekamsk (2)	Ufa
	Ageyan 23'	Report	Sukhomlinov 80'	Stadium: Neftyanik Stadium; Attendance: 867; Referee: Matvey Zaika
	Penalties
	Matskharashvili (penalty missed); Akhatov (penalty missed); Khabalov (penalty missed); Isayev (penalty scored)		(penalty scored) Mashukov; (penalty missed) Nikitin; (penalty scored) Kokoyev; (penalty scored) Bobyor

30 October 2025	Fakel Voronezh (2)	2–3	Arsenal Tula (2)	Voronezh
	Abdokov 42'; Giorgobiani 80'	Report	Zhuravlyov 32' (o.g.); Gorbunov 58'; Lipovoy 90'	Stadium: Fakel Stadium; Attendance: 8,457; Referee: Anton Anopa

== Group stage (RPL path) ==
The draw for group stage was held on 29 June 2025.

16 teams of the Russian Premier League (RPL) will start the tournament from the group stage (4 teams in each group). The teams will play 6 matches in the group stage:

- 1st day — 29–31 July;
- 2nd day — 12–14 August;
- 3rd day — 26–28 August;
- 4th day — 16–18 September;
- 5th day — 30 September – 2 October;
- 6th day — 21–23 October.

Pot 1	Pot 2	Pot 3	Pot 4
Krasnodar; Zenit Saint Petersburg; CSKA Moscow; Spartak Moscow	Dynamo Moscow; Lokomotiv Moscow; Rubin Kazan; Rostov	Akron Tolyatti; Krylia Sovetov Samara; Dynamo Makhachkala; Akhmat Grozny	Baltika Kaliningrad; Orenburg (Note: Torpedo Moscow was replaced by Orenburg); Sochi; Pari Nizhny Novgorod

Composition of the pots is based on results of the 2024–25 Russian Premier League and 2024–25 Russian First League. In the same group there can't be more than 2 teams from Moscow, also FC Krasnodar and FC Rostov can't be in the same group due to logistics restrictions in this cities.

On 10 July 2025, as a result of the decisions made at the meeting of the Russian Football Union's Control and Disciplinary Committee, Torpedo Moscow was excluded from the 2025-26 season, and was replaced by Orenburg.

Times are MSK (UTC+3), as listed by RFU (local times, if different, are in parentheses).

=== Group A ===
Pos	Team	Pld	W	PW	PL	L	GF	GA	GD	Pts	Qualification	ZEN	ORE	RUB	AKH
1	Zenit Saint Petersburg	6	6	0	0	0	19	5	+14	18	Qualification to the Knockout phase (RPL path)	—	6–0	3–0	2–1
2	Orenburg	6	2	1	0	3	6	14	−8	8	Qualification to the Knockout phase (RPL path)	3–5	—	0–0 (Note: Orenburg won 4–2 on penalties.)	2–1
3	Rubin Kazan	6	1	1	1	3	5	9	−4	6	Qualification to the Knockout phase (regions path)	0–1	2–0	—	3–3 (Note: Rubin won 4–3 on penalties.)
4	Akhmat Grozny	6	1	0	1	4	8	10	−2	4		1–2	0–1	2–0	—

Source: Russian Football Union (in Russian)
Rules for classification: 1) Points; 2) Head-to-head points; 3) Head-to-head matches won; 4) Head-to-head goal difference; 5) Head-to-head goals scored; 6) Matches won; 7) Goal difference; 8) Goals scored; 9) Penalty shoot-out goal difference; 10) Draw.
Notes:

30 July 2025 Matchday 1	Akhmat Grozny	1–2	Zenit Saint Petersburg	Grozny
20:45	Ghandri (yellow card) 53'; Konaté 83' (pen.)	Report	Adamov 3'; Gondou 8'; Vega (yellow card) 90+5'	Stadium: Akhmat-Arena; Attendance: 6,872; Referee: Mikhail Cheremnykh

31 July 2025 Matchday 1	Rubin Kazan	2–0	Orenburg	Kazan
19:30	Daku 30' (pen.); Ivanov 90'	Report	Poroykov (yellow card) 33'; Bubanja (yellow card) 48'; Gürlük (yellow card) 81'	Stadium: Ak Bars Arena; Attendance: 13,048; Referee: Yuriy Karpov

12 August 2025 Matchday 2	Zenit Saint Petersburg	3–0	Rubin Kazan	Saint-Petersburg
18:30	Cassiera 70', 79' (pen.); Shilov 84'	Report	Jukić (yellow card) 48'; Jočić (yellow card) 57'	Stadium: Gazprom Arena; Attendance: 35,161; Referee: Sergey Cheban

13 August 2025 Matchday 2	Orenburg	2–1	Akhmat Grozny	Orenburg
16:15 (18:15 YEKT)	Baranovsky (yellow card) 5'; Poroykov 56'; Kamilov (yellow card) 23' (goal) 90+5'	Report	Zare (yellow card) 19'; Silva (yellow card) 26'; Ghandri (yellow card) 82'; Cacintura (yellow card) 85'; Sadulayev (yellow card) 86'; Keliano 90+1'	Stadium: Gazovik Stadium; Attendance: 3,029; Referee: Vasiliy Kazartsev

26 August 2025 Matchday 3	Orenburg	3–5	Zenit Saint Petersburg	Orenburg
18:30 (20:30 YEKT)	Bubanja 24'; Tatayev 33'; Poroykov (yellow card) 42'; Revazov (yellow card) 55' (goal) 67'	Report	Glushenkov 2', 56'; Yerokhin 12'; Douglas 22'; Cassierra 43' (pen.)	Stadium: Gazovik Stadium; Attendance: 7,072; Referee: Sergey Tsyganok

26 August 2025 Matchday 3	Akhmat Grozny	2–0	Rubin Kazan	Grozny
20:45	Sadulayev 5'; Melkadze 27'; Silva (yellow card) 84'; Ndong (yellow card) 90+3'	Report	Zotov (yellow card) 13'; Iwu (yellow card) 62'; Kabutov (yellow card) 70'	Stadium: Akhmat-Arena; Attendance: 5,673; Referee: Evgeniy Kukulyak

16 September 2025 Matchday 4	Orenburg	0–0 (4–2 p)	Rubin Kazan	Orenburg
16:30 (18:30 YEKT)	Tatayev (yellow card) 35'; Koserik (yellow card) 89'	Report	Čumić (yellow card) 14' (yellow-red card) 24'	Stadium: Gazovik Stadium; Attendance: 2,834; Referee: Pavel Shadykhanov
	Penalties
	Du Queiroz (penalty scored); Thompson (penalty scored); Gürlük (penalty scored); Koserik (penalty missed); Savelyev (penalty scored)		(penalty missed) Shvets; (penalty missed) Hodža; (penalty scored) Siwe; (penalty scored) Nizhegorodov

17 September 2025 Matchday 4	Zenit Saint Petersburg	2–1	Akhmat Grozny	Saint-Petersburg
20:30	Mikhaylov (yellow card) 9'; Sobolev 43', 59'; Adamov (yellow card) 83'	Report	Mansilla (yellow card) 23'; Samorodov (yellow card) 51'; Ghandri 73' (yellow card) 90+5'	Stadium: Gazprom Arena; Attendance: 25,464; Referee: Rafael Shafeev

30 September 2025 Matchday 5	Rubin Kazan	0–1	Zenit Saint Petersburg	Kazan
18:00	Daku (yellow card) 67'; Siwe (yellow card) 90+1'	Report	Gondou 3'; Mikhaylov (yellow card) 37'; Eraković (yellow card) 43'; Gorshkov (yellow card) 51'; Vega (yellow card) 84'	Stadium: Ak Bars Arena; Attendance: 17,575; Referee: Vladislav Tselovalnikov

30 September 2025 Matchday 5	Akhmat Grozny	0–1	Orenburg	Grozny
20:30		Report	Poroykov 70'	Stadium: Akhmat-Arena; Attendance: 4,218; Referee: Mikhail Cheremnykh

22 October 2025 Matchday 6	Rubin Kazan	3–3 (4–3 p)	Akhmat Grozny	Kazan
18:00	Teslenko 41'; Rozhkov (yellow card) 45'; Bezrukov 50'; Shabanhaxhaj (yellow card) 15' (goal) 53'; Ivanov (yellow card) 66'	Report	Zhemaletdinov 22'; Melkadze 36'; Sadulayev (yellow card) 56'; Ndong 67'	Stadium: Ak Bars Arena; Attendance: 5,704; Referee: Sergey Cheban
	Penalties
	Nizhegorodov (penalty missed); Bezrukov (penalty scored); Daku (penalty scored); Arroyo (penalty scored); Hodža (penalty scored)		(penalty scored) Melkadze; (penalty missed) Ghandri; (penalty scored) Ndong; (penalty scored) Keliano; (penalty missed) Zhemaletdinov

22 October 2025 Matchday 6	Zenit Saint Petersburg	6–0	Orenburg	Saint Petersburg
20:30	Gorshkov 27'; Gerson 33'; Shilov 45+1'; Yerokhin 64', 79'; Mantuan 68'	Report	Revazov (red card) 7'; Kamilov (yellow card) 50'; Gorelov (yellow card) 63'	Stadium: Gazprom Arena; Attendance: 24,655; Referee: Yury Karpov

=== Group B ===
Pos	Team	Pld	W	PW	PL	L	GF	GA	GD	Pts	Qualification	KRA	DMO	KRY	SOC
1	Krasnodar	6	4	1	0	1	14	5	+9	14	Qualification to the Knockout phase (RPL path)	—	0–0 (Note: Krasnodar won 4–2 on penalties.)	1–2	3–0
2	Dynamo Moscow	6	3	0	2	1	11	6	+5	11	Qualification to the Knockout phase (RPL path)	0–4	—	4–0	3–2
3	Krylia Sovetov Samara	6	1	2	1	2	7	11	−4	8	Qualification to the Knockout phase (regions path)	1–2	0–0 (Note: Krylia Sovetov Samara won 5–4 on penalties.)	—	3–3 (Note: Krylia Sovetov Samara won 5–4 on penalties.)
4	Sochi	6	0	1	1	4	8	18	−10	3		2–4	0–4	1–1 (Note: Sochi won 5–3 on penalties.)	—

Source: Russian Football Union (in Russian)
Rules for classification: 1) Points; 2) Head-to-head points; 3) Head-to-head matches won; 4) Head-to-head goal difference; 5) Head-to-head goals scored; 6) Matches won; 7) Goal difference; 8) Goals scored; 9) Penalty shoot-out goal difference; 10) Draw.
Notes:

29 July 2025 Matchday 1	Dynamo Moscow	3–2	Sochi	Moscow
18:30	Sergeev 9', 57'; Okishor (yellow card) 24'; Aleksandrov (yellow card) 44'; Smelov (yellow card) 89'; Karpin (manager) (yellow card) 90+3'; Fomin 90+5'	Report	Vasilyev 34' (yellow card) 59'; Fyodorov 35' (yellow card) 35'	Stadium: VTB Arena; Attendance: 16,151; Referee: Ivan Saraev

29 July 2025 Matchday 1	Krasnodar	1–2	Krylia Sovetov Samara	Krasnodar
20:45	Kozlov 12'; Musayev (manager) (yellow card) 28'; Douglas (yellow card) 37'; Khmarin (yellow card) 45+4'; Cobnan (yellow card) 79'	Report	Marín 10'; Soldatenkov (yellow card) 14'; Rahmanović 28' (yellow card) 86'; Babkin (yellow card) 80'	Stadium: Ozon Arena; Attendance: 15,737; Referee: Sergey Tsyganok

13 August 2025 Matchday 2	Sochi	1–1 (5–3 p)	Krylia Sovetov Samara	Sochi
18:30	Chirkov 62'; Alves (yellow card) 90'	Report	Babkin (yellow card) 80'; Lepsky 88'	Stadium: Fisht Stadium; Attendance: 5,219; Referee: Maksim Perezva
	Penalties
	Fyodorov (penalty scored); Alves (penalty scored); Saavedra (penalty scored); Litvinov (penalty scored); Kramarič (penalty scored)		(penalty scored) Lepsky; (penalty scored) Babkin; (penalty scored) Akhmetov; (penalty missed) Vityugov

13 August 2025 Matchday 2	Dynamo Moscow	0–4	Krasnodar	Moscow
20:45		Report	Mukailov 19', 44'; Furtado 35'; Spertsyan 88'; Krivtsov (yellow card) 88'; Jubal (yellow card) 90'	Stadium: VTB Arena; Attendance: 21,978; Referee: Anton Frolov

27 August 2025 Matchday 3	Krylia Sovetov Samara	0–0 (5–4 p)	Dynamo Moscow	Samara
16:15 (17:15 SAMT)		Report		Stadium: Solidarnost Samara Arena; Attendance: 8,166; Referee: Pavel Shadykhanov
	Penalties
	Soldatenkov (penalty scored); Sutormin (penalty scored); Akhmetov (penalty scored); Marín (penalty scored); Pyachenin (penalty scored)		(penalty scored) Skopintsev; (penalty scored) Fomin; (penalty scored) Sergeyev; (penalty missed) Marichal; (penalty scored) Bitello

27 August 2025 Matchday 3	Sochi	2–4	Krasnodar	Sochi
18:30	Chirkov 78'; Saavedra (yellow card) 88' (goal) 90+1'	Report	Kozlov 19'; Pina 20'; Krivtsov 50'; Perrin 85'	Stadium: Fisht Stadium; Attendance: 8,626; Referee: Mikhail Cheremnykh

17 September 2025 Matchday 4	Krylia Sovetov Samara	1–2	Krasnodar	Samara
18:10 (19:00 SAMT)	Bozhin 83' (yellow card) 86'	Report	Kozlov 14'; Stezhko (yellow card) 43'; Krivtsov (yellow card) 45+2'; Córdoba (yellow card) 55'; Douglas 62'; Agkatsev (yellow card) 90+2'	Stadium: Solidarnost Samara Arena; Attendance: 8,466; Referee: Evgeniy Kukulyak

17 September 2025 Matchday 4	Sochi	0–4	Dynamo Moscow	Sochi
20:30	Agbalaka (yellow card) 17'; Osipov (yellow card) 77'; Saavedra (yellow card) 84'	Report	Maouhoub 10'; Skopintsev 22'; Marichal 36'; Tyukavin 50'; Makarov (yellow card) 66'; Okishor (yellow card) 79'	Stadium: Fisht Stadium; Attendance: 4,853; Referee: Ivan Saraev

30 September 2025 Matchday 5	Krasnodar	0–0 (4–2 p)	Dynamo Moscow	Krasnodar
20:30	Stezhko (yellow card) 4'; Pina (yellow card) 52'; Costa (yellow card) 90'	Report		Stadium: Ozon Arena; Attendance: 22,017; Referee: Anton Frolov
	Penalties
	Olaza (penalty scored); Córdoba (penalty scored); Kozlov (penalty scored); Pina (penalty scored)		(penalty scored) Sergeyev; (penalty missed) Gladyshev; (penalty scored) Maouhoub; (penalty missed) Miranchuk

1 October 2025 Matchday 5	Krylia Sovetov Samara	3–3 (5–4 p)	Sochi	Samara
18:00 (19:00 SAMT)	Yevgenyev 40'; Aberdin 45' (o.g.); Kokarev (yellow card) 70'; Chernov (yellow card) 9' (goal) 82'	Report	Ignatov 35'; Kramarič 70' (pen.) (yellow card) 70'; Zinkovsky 87'	Stadium: Solidarnost Samara Arena; Attendance: 6,495; Referee: Sergey Cheban
	Penalties
	Lepsky (penalty scored); Sutormin (penalty scored); Oleynikov (penalty scored); Costanza (penalty scored); Pyachenin (penalty scored)		(penalty scored) Makarchuk; (penalty missed) Kramarič; (penalty scored) Zinkovsky; (penalty scored) Kravtsov; (penalty scored) Osipov

22 October 2025 Matchday 6	Dynamo Moscow	4–0	Krylia Sovetov Samara	Moscow
18:00	Babayev 23', 72', 78' (yellow card) 86'; Rubens (yellow card) 35'; Fomin 60'	Report	Sutormin (yellow card) 76'	Stadium: VTB Arena; Attendance: 11,997; Referee: Vladislav Tselovalnikov

23 October 2025 Matchday 6	Krasnodar	3–0	Sochi	Krasnodar
18:30	Kozlov 21'; Córdoba 85'; Batxi 90+4'	Report		Stadium: Ozon Arena; Attendance: 13,257; Referee: Stanislav Matveyev

=== Group C ===
Pos	Team	Pld	W	PW	PL	L	GF	GA	GD	Pts	Qualification	SPA	DMA	ROS	PNN
1	Spartak Moscow	6	4	0	1	1	13	5	+8	13	Qualification to the Knockout phase (RPL path)	—	1–1 (Note: Dynamo Makhachkala won 4–3 on penalties.)	1–2	4–0
2	Dynamo Makhachkala	6	3	2	0	1	9	7	+2	13	Qualification to the Knockout phase (RPL path)	1–3	—	1–1 (Note: Dynamo Makhachkala won 4–2 on penalties.)	1–0
3	Rostov	6	2	0	1	3	8	9	−1	7	Qualification to the Knockout phase (regions path)	0–2	1–3	—	4–1
4	Pari Nizhny Novgorod	6	1	0	0	5	4	13	−9	3		1–2	1–2	1–0	—

Source: Russian Football Union (in Russian)
Rules for classification: 1) Points; 2) Head-to-head points; 3) Head-to-head matches won; 4) Head-to-head goal difference; 5) Head-to-head goals scored; 6) Matches won; 7) Goal difference; 8) Goals scored; 9) Penalty shoot-out goal difference; 10) Draw.
Notes:

30 July 2025 Matchday 1	Dynamo Makhachkala	1–0	Pari Nizhny Novgorod	Kaspiysk
18:30	Sundukov (yellow card) 78'; Agalarov 80'	Report	Shnaptsev (yellow card) 7'; Ivlev (yellow card) 90+2'	Stadium: Anzhi Arena; Attendance: 5,476; Referee: Anton Frolov

30 July 2025 Matchday 1	Rostov	0–2	Spartak Moscow	Rostov-on-Don
20:45	Shamonin (yellow card) 15'; Semenchuk (yellow card) 17'; Mohebi (yellow card) 20'; Tarasov (yellow card) 45+2'; Shchetinin (yellow card) 60'; Mironov (yellow card) 90+4'	Report	Duarte (yellow card) 23'; Khlusevich 28'; Solari 45+3' (pen.)	Stadium: Rostov Arena; Attendance: 20,922; Referee: Evgeniy Bulanov

12 August 2025 Matchday 2	Spartak Moscow	1–1 (3–4 p)	Dynamo Makhachkala	Moscow
20:45	Dmitriyev (yellow card) 31'; Denisov (yellow card) 55'; Solari (yellow card) 85'; Guziyev (yellow card) 89'; Litvinov 90+5'	Report	Zinovich (yellow card) 78'; Agalarov 87' (pen.); Azzi (yellow card) 90+4'	Stadium: Lukoil Arena; Attendance: 16,930; Referee: Vladislav Tselovalnikov
	Penalties
	Solari (penalty scored); Umyarov (penalty scored); Zorin (penalty missed); Litvinov (penalty scored); Zobnin (penalty missed)		(penalty missed) Agalarov; (penalty scored) Magomedov; (penalty scored) El Moubarik; (penalty scored) Mrezigue; (penalty scored) Paltsev

14 August 2025 Matchday 2	Pari Nizhny Novgorod	1–0	Rostov	Saransk
19:30	Shpilevsky (manager) (yellow card) 65'; Boselli 74'; Shnaptsev (yellow card) 88'	Report	Mohebi (yellow card) 69' (yellow-red card) 85'; Tarasov (red card) 73'	Stadium: Mordovia Arena (Note: Pari NN played their Russian Cup home match at the Mordovia Arena, in Saransk, instead of their regular venue, the Nizhny Novgorod Stadium, in Nizhny Novgorod, in accordance with the decision of the RFU Executive Committee Bureau (paragraph 7.9) of the competition regulations, and also taking into account the request of Pari NN and the consent of the club from Rostov-on-Don); Attendance: 12,137; Referee: Vera Opeykina

26 August 2025 Matchday 3	Spartak Moscow	4–0	Pari Nizhny Novgorod	Moscow
20:45	Zobnin 12'; Samoshnikov (yellow card) 10' (goal) 36'; Dmitriyev (yellow card) 47'; Pigas 69' (o.g.); Zorin (yellow card) 45' (goal) 88'; Prutsev (yellow card) 90+4'	Report	Yermakov (yellow card) 45+2'; Krashevsky (yellow card) 49'; Castillo (yellow card) 90+3'	Stadium: Lukoil Arena; Attendance: 18,932; Referee: Ranel Ziyakov

27 August 2025 Matchday 3	Rostov	1–3	Dynamo Makhachkala	Rostov-on-Don
20:45	Mironov 61'; Suleymanov (yellow card) 76'	Report	Kagermazov (yellow card) 33'; Shumakhov (yellow card) 47'; Sundukov (yellow card) 55'; Mastouri 82'; Paltsev 84'; Magomedov 88'	Stadium: Rostov Arena; Attendance: 14,716; Referee: Ivan Saraev

16 September 2025 Matchday 4	Pari Nizhny Novgorod	1–2	Dynamo Makhachkala	Saransk
20:45	Castillo 45+1' (yellow card) 61'; Grulyov (yellow card) 46'	Report	Mrezigue (yellow card) 39'; Dzhabrailov (yellow card) 65'; Kagermazov (yellow card) 66' (yellow-red card) 69'; Agalarov 76' (pen.); Azzi 79'	Stadium: Mordovia Arena (Note: Pari NN played their Russian Cup home match at the Mordovia Arena, in Saransk, instead of their regular venue, the Nizhny Novgorod Stadium, in Nizhny Novgorod.); Attendance: 2,381; Referee: Yuriy Karpov

18 September 2025 Matchday 4	Spartak Moscow	1–2	Rostov	Moscow
20:45	Ugalde 7'; Djiku (yellow card) 76'	Report	Sako (yellow card) 40'; Shantaly 54'; Suleymanov (yellow card) 70'; Prokhin (yellow card) 86'; Vakhaniya 88'	Stadium: Lukoil Arena; Attendance: 18,074; Referee: Anton Frolov

1 October 2025 Matchday 5	Pari Nizhny Novgorod	1–2	Spartak Moscow	Nizhny Novgorod
18:00	Boselli 28'; Ivlev (yellow card) 59'; Karič (yellow card) 71' (yellow-red card) 83'	Report	García 17' (pen.); Martins (yellow card) 39'; Wooh (yellow card) 45'; Zorin (yellow card) 57'; Fernandes 90+3'	Stadium: Nizhny Novgorod Stadium; Attendance: 14,120; Referee: Pavel Kukuyan

2 October 2025 Matchday 5	Dynamo Makhachkala	1–1 (4–2 p)	Rostov	Kaspiysk
19:30	Alarcón (yellow card) 13'; Shikhaliyev (yellow card) 43'; Mrezigue (yellow card) 60'; Sundukov 64'; Akhmedov (yellow card) 82'	Report	Shantaly 33'; Mohebi (yellow card) 68'; Melyokhin (yellow card) 90+3'	Stadium: Anzhi Arena; Attendance: 3,900; Referee: Ranel Ziyakov
	Penalties
	Budunov (penalty scored); Akhmedov (penalty missed); Mrezigue (penalty scored); Miro (penalty scored); I. Azzi (penalty scored)		(penalty scored) Mironov; (penalty missed) Ronaldo; (penalty scored) Ignatov; (penalty missed) Melyokhin

21 October 2025 Matchday 6	Dynamo Makhachkala	1–3	Spartak Moscow	Kaspiysk
18:00	Mastouri (yellow card) 12' (goal) 25'; M. Azzi (yellow card) 36'; I. Azzi (yellow card) 76'; Andrés Alarcón (yellow card) 84'	Report	Zabolotny (yellow card) 17'; Marquinhos 34'; Massalyga 59'; Dmitriyev 67'	Stadium: Anzhi Arena; Attendance: 4,900; Referee: Inal Tanashev

22 October 2025 Matchday 6	Rostov	4–1	Pari Nizhny Novgorod	Rostov-on-Don
20:30	Komarov (yellow card) 20'; Ignatov 21'; Shantaly 44'; Bayramyan 49'; Golenkov 90+3'	Report	Boselli 45+5' (pen.); Yury Koledin (yellow card) 90'	Stadium: Rostov Arena; Attendance: 14,892; Referee: Maksim Perezva

=== Group D ===
Pos	Team	Pld	W	PW	PL	L	GF	GA	GD	Pts	Qualification	CSK	LOK	BAL	AKR
1	CSKA Moscow	6	3	1	2	0	9	5	+4	13	Qualification to the Knockout phase (RPL path)	—	2–1	1–1 (Note: Baltika Kaliningrad won 10–9 on penalties.)	3–2
2	Lokomotiv Moscow	6	4	0	1	1	10	4	+6	13	Qualification to the Knockout phase (RPL path)	0–0 (Note: CSKA Moscow won 4–2 on penalties.)	—	2–0	2–0
3	Baltika Kaliningrad	6	1	1	0	4	6	9	−3	5	Qualification to the Knockout phase (regions path)	0–2	1–2	—	3–0
4	Akron Tolyatti	6	1	1	0	4	6	13	−7	5		1–1 (Note: Akron Tolyatti won 5–4 on penalties.)	1–3	2–1	—

Source: Russian Football Union (in Russian)
Rules for classification: 1) Points; 2) Head-to-head points; 3) Head-to-head matches won; 4) Head-to-head goal difference; 5) Head-to-head goals scored; 6) Matches won; 7) Goal difference; 8) Goals scored; 9) Penalty shoot-out goal difference; 10) Draw.
Notes:

29 July 2025 Matchday 1	Akron Tolyatti	2–1	Baltika Kaliningrad	Samara
18:30 (19:30 SAMT)	Benchimol 7' (pen.), 90+7'; Bokoyev (yellow card) 90+3'	Report	Filin (yellow card) 6'; Yenne 14' (yellow card) 58'; Talalayev (manager) (yellow card) 82'	Stadium: Solidarnost Samara Arena; Attendance: 3,635; Referee: Maksim Perezva

30 July 2025 Matchday 1	CSKA Moscow	2–1	Lokomotiv Moscow	Moscow
18:30	Gajić 31'; Glebov 79'	Report	Godyayev (yellow card) 14'; Nyamsi (yellow card) 45+1'; Batrakov 68' (pen.); Silyanov (yellow card) 87'	Stadium: VEB Arena; Attendance: 24,256; Referee: Rafael Shafeev

12 August 2025 Matchday 2	Akron Tolyatti	1–1 (5–4 p)	CSKA Moscow	Samara
16:15 (17:15 SAMT)	Bakayev 53'; Escoval (yellow card) 86'; Savichev (yellow card) 90+3'	Report	Musayev 70'	Stadium: Solidarnost Samara Arena; Attendance: 4,852; Referee: Pavel Shadykhanov
	Penalties
	Savichev (penalty scored); Đakovac (penalty scored); Bokoyev (penalty scored); Boldyrev (penalty missed); Dmitriyev (penalty scored); Bakayev (penalty scored)		(penalty scored) Oblyakov; (penalty scored) Musayev; (penalty scored) Alves; (penalty scored) Moisés; (penalty missed) Krugovoy; (penalty missed) Glebov

13 August 2025 Matchday 2	Lokomotiv Moscow	2–0	Baltika Kaliningrad	Moscow
18:30	Batrakov 23' (pen.) (yellow card) 90+1'; Pogostnov (yellow card) 64'; Rudenko (yellow card) 90+2'; Vorobyov 90+8'	Report	Utkin (yellow card) 52'; Belikov (yellow card) 90+2'; Beveyev (yellow card) 90+4'	Stadium: RZD Arena; Attendance: 11,045; Referee: Ivan Saraev

27 August 2025 Matchday 3	Baltika Kaliningrad	0–2	CSKA Moscow	Kaliningrad
20:45 (19:45 KALT)	Luna (yellow card) 6'; Kovač (yellow card) 30'; Mourid (yellow card) 63'; Andrade (yellow card) 74'	Report	Abdulkadyrov (yellow card) 66'; Oblyakov (yellow card) 69' (goal) 78' (pen.), 90' (pen.)	Stadium: Rostec Arena; Attendance: 23,386; Referee: Inal Tanashev

28 August 2025 Matchday 3	Lokomotiv Moscow	2–0	Akron Tolyatti	Moscow
19:30	Komlichenko 12'; Vorobyov 71' (pen.); Batrakov (yellow card) 77'	Report	Maradishvili (yellow card) 47' (yellow-red card) 64'; Escoval (yellow card) 60'	Stadium: RZD Arena; Attendance: 10,653; Referee: Yuriy Karpov

16 September 2025 Matchday 4	Akron Tolyatti	1–3	Lokomotiv Moscow	Samara
18:45 (19:45 SAMT)	Popenkov (yellow card) 44'; Pestryakov 88' (pen.); Khosonov (yellow card) 90+3'; Lončar (yellow card) 90+3'	Report	Komlichenko 48', 49'; Vorobyov (yellow card) 90+3'; Popenkov 90+4' (o.g.)	Stadium: Solidarnost Samara Arena; Attendance: 2,078; Referee: Mikhail Cheremnykh

18 September 2025 Matchday 4	CSKA Moscow	1–1 (9–10 p)	Baltika Kaliningrad	Moscow
18:30	Alves (yellow card) 29'; Musayev 38'	Report	Offor (yellow card) 59'; Luna (yellow card) 71'; Talalayev (manager) (yellow card) 79'; Manelov (yellow card) 90+1'; Stepanov 90+3'	Stadium: VEB Arena; Attendance: 23,965; Referee: Vladislav Tselovalnikov
	Penalties
	Oblyakov (penalty scored); Alerrandro (penalty missed); Krugovoy (penalty scored); Carmo (penalty scored); Musayev (penalty scored); Popović (penalty scored); Gajić (penalty scored); Lukin (penalty scored); Bandikyan (penalty scored); Abdulkadyrov (penalty scored); Torop (penalty missed)		(penalty scored) Filin; (penalty scored) Manelov; (penalty scored) Titkov; (penalty scored) Stepanov; (penalty missed) Pryakhin; (penalty scored) Offor; (penalty scored) Belokov; (penalty scored) Luna; (penalty scored) Obonin; (penalty scored) Mokhammad; (penalty scored) Kukushkin

1 October 2025 Matchday 5	Baltika Kaliningrad	3–0	Akron Tolyatti	Kaliningrad
20:30	Offor 33'; Gassama 54'; Kavalyow (yellow card) 89'; Yenne 90+4'	Report	Agapov (yellow card) 56'; Popenkov (yellow card) 58' (yellow-red card) 69'; Maradishvili (yellow card) 71'	Stadium: Rostec Arena; Attendance: 10,138; Referee: Maksim Perezva

1 October 2025 Matchday 5	Lokomotiv Moscow	0–0 (2–4 p)	CSKA Moscow	Moscow
20:30	Nenakhov (yellow card) 88'	Report		Stadium: RZD Arena; Attendance: 20,011; Referee: Ivan Abrosimov
	Penalties
	Vorobyov (penalty scored); Batrakov (penalty missed); Timofeyev (penalty missed); Nyamsi (penalty scored)		(penalty scored) Oblyakov; (penalty scored) Alerrandro; (penalty scored) Krugovoy; (penalty scored) Carmo

21 October 2025 Matchday 6	CSKA Moscow	3–2	Akron Tolyatti	Moscow
20:30	Shumansky (yellow card) 34' (goal) 45'; Moisés (yellow card) 70'; Kislyak 78'; Alerrandro 82'	Report	Benchimol 65' (pen.), 90+5' (pen.); Agapov (yellow card) 90'	Stadium: VEB Arena; Attendance: 11,282; Referee: Sergey Tsyganok

23 October 2025 Matchday 6	Baltika Kaliningrad	1–2	Lokomotiv Moscow	Kaliningrad
21:00	Kavalyow (yellow card) 5'; Andrade (yellow card) 15'; Stepanov 90+1'	Report	Morozov (yellow card) 12'; Nenakhov (yellow card) 25'; Prutsev (yellow card) 27'; Sarveli 45+1'; Filin 49' (o.g.); Godyayev (yellow card) 75'; Timofeyev (yellow card) 82'; Saltykov (yellow card) 90'	Stadium: Rostec Arena; Attendance: 14,168; Referee: Pavel Shadykhanov

== Quarter-finals ==
=== RPL Path ===
Team 1	Agg.	Team 2	1st leg	2nd leg
Orenburg	1–7	Krasnodar	1–3	0–4
Dynamo Makhachkala	2–2 (4–5 p)	CSKA Moscow	1–0	1–2
Zenit Saint Petersburg	2–3	Dynamo Moscow	1–3	1–0
Spartak Moscow	6–3	Lokomotiv Moscow	3–1	3–2

5 November 2025	Orenburg	1–3	Krasnodar	Orenburg
18:00	Savelyev 9'; Poroykov (yellow card) 18'; Kamilov (yellow card) 38'; Savelyev (yellow card) 52'; Bubanja (yellow card) 76'; Koserik (yellow card) 86'; Bolotov (yellow card) 90+3'	Report	Kozlov 12'; Perrin (yellow card) 45+1'; Córdoba 88', 90+5'; Krivtsov (yellow card) 90+4'	Stadium: Gazovik Stadium; Attendance: 2,175; Referee: Vasily Kazartsev

26 November 2025	Krasnodar	4–0	Orenburg	Krasnodar
18:00	Krivtsov 4' (yellow card) 5'; Mukailov (yellow card) 36'; Córdoba 57'; Batxi 71'; Jubal 85'	Report	Du Queiroz (yellow card) 10'; Kvekveskiri (yellow card) 62'	Stadium: Ozon Arena; Attendance: 13,343; Referee: Ranel Ziyakov

5 November 2025	Dynamo Makhachkala	1–0	CSKA Moscow	Kaspiysk
18:15	Sundukov (yellow card) 27'; Magomedov 45+6' (pen.); Mastouri (yellow card) 74'; Dzhabrailov (yellow card) 88'	Report	Musayev (yellow card) 39'; Abdulkadyrov (yellow card) 43'; Shumansky (yellow card) 82'; Villagra (yellow card) 83'	Stadium: Anzhi Arena; Attendance: 5,140; Referee: Ivan Sarayev

26 November 2025	CSKA Moscow	2–1 (5–4 p)	Dynamo Makhachkala	Moscow
18:00	Kislyak (yellow card) 53'; Alarcón 68' (o.g.); Moisés (yellow card) 73'; Oblyakov (yellow card) 90'; Popović 90'	Report	Alarcón 8'	Stadium: VEB Arena; Attendance: 11,552; Referee: Artyom Chistyakov
	Penalties
	Oblyakov (penalty scored); Moisés (penalty scored); Popović (penalty scored); Kislyak (penalty scored); Gajić (penalty scored)		(penalty missed) Dzhabrailov; (penalty scored) El Moubarik; (penalty scored) Miro; (penalty scored) Javad; (penalty scored) Shumakhov

5 November 2025	Zenit Saint Petersburg	1–3	Dynamo Moscow	Saint Petersburg
20:30	Sobolev (yellow card) 45+4'; Pedrinho 77'	Report	Sergeyev 54'; Marichal (yellow card) 56'; Fomin (yellow card) 59'; Zaydenzal (yellow card) 79'; Babayev 85'; Tyukavin 90+4'	Stadium: Gazprom Arena; Attendance: 27,186; Referee: Yegor Yegorov

27 November 2025	Dynamo Moscow	0–1	Zenit Saint Petersburg	Moscow
20:30	Fomin (yellow card) 63'; Okishor (yellow card) 78'	Report	Mostovoy 29' (pen.); Alip (yellow card) 88'	Stadium: VTB Arena; Attendance: 22,058; Referee: Anton Frolov

6 November 2025	Spartak Moscow	3–1	Lokomotiv Moscow	Moscow
19:30	García 4'; Fasson 49' (o.g.); Marquinhos 55'; Solari (yellow card) 60'	Report	Timofeyev (yellow card) 13'; Barinov (yellow card) 26'; Bakayev (yellow card) 45'; Batrakov 67'; Rudenko (yellow card) 88'	Stadium: Lukoil Arena; Attendance: 31,019; Referee: Pavel Kukuyan

26 November 2025	Lokomotiv Moscow	2–3	Spartak Moscow	Moscow
20:30	Batrakov 24'; Bakayev (yellow card) 40'; Nyamsi (yellow card) 63'; Prutsev (yellow card) 84'; Komlichenko 90+7' (pen.); Montes (yellow card) 90+9'	Report	Umyarov (yellow card) 35'; Ugalde 41'; Marquinhos 53'; Solari (yellow card) 30' (goal) 57'	Stadium: RZD Arena; Attendance: 20,170; Referee: Aleksey Sukhoy

=== Regions Path ===
==== Stage 1 ====
25 November 2025	Torpedo Moscow (2)	0–2	Baltika Kaliningrad	Khimki
18:00	Baytukov (yellow card) 25'	Report	Mendel 19'; Offor 71'	Stadium: Arena Khimki; Attendance: 852; Referee: Andrey Prokopov

25 November 2025	Arsenal Tula (2)	0–0 (3–2 p)	Rubin Kazan	Tula
20:30	Avanesyan (yellow card) 77'	Report	Kuzyayev (yellow card) 32'	Stadium: Arsenal Stadium; Attendance: 6,717; Referee: Vasily Kazartsev
	Penalties
	Bolshakov (penalty missed); Kalmykov (penalty scored); Brnović (penalty missed); Penchikov (penalty scored); Mirzov (penalty scored)		(penalty scored) Bezrukov; (penalty scored) Vujačić; (penalty missed) Vasilyev; (penalty missed) Arroyo; (penalty missed) Kuzyayev

26 November 2025	Neftekhimik Nizhnekamsk (2)	1–3	Rostov	Nizhnekamsk
20:30	Mashukov 46'; Shiryayev (yellow card) 51'	Report	Komarov 18', 36'; Chistyakov 49'; Sako (yellow card) 65'	Stadium: Neftekhimik Stadium; Attendance: 1,713; Referee: Yevgeny Kukulyak

27 November 2025	KAMAZ Naberezhnye Chelny (2)	1–1 (2–4 p)	Krylia Sovetov Samara	Naberezhnye Chelny
18:00	Golybin (yellow card) 29'; Shamkin 33'; Burko (yellow card) 61'; Ayukin (yellow card) 66'	Report	Banjac 56'; Chernov (yellow card) 78'; Rahmanović (yellow card) 90+4'	Stadium: KAMAZ Stadium; Attendance: 4,489; Referee: Stanislav Matveyev
	Penalties
	Karaev (penalty missed); Khubayev (penalty missed); Deryugin (penalty scored); Motorin (penalty scored)		(penalty scored) Lepsky; (penalty scored) Rahmanović; (penalty scored) Akhmetov; (penalty scored) Khubulov

==== Stage 2 ====
3 March 2026	Baltika Kaliningrad	0–1	Zenit Saint Petersburg	Kaliningrad
20:00	Stepanov (yellow card) 45'; Ryadno (yellow card) 46'; Pospelov (yellow card) 69'	Report	Pedro (yellow card) 33'; Sobolev 79'; Kondakov (yellow card) 80'	Stadium: Kaliningrad Stadium; Attendance: 21,997; Referee: Inal Tanashev

4 March 2026	Krylia Sovetov Samara	2–0	Orenburg	Samara
18:30	Galdames (yellow card) 38'; Fernández 52'; Babkin 74'	Report	Kvekveskiri (yellow card) 6' (yellow-red card) 90+3'; Bolotov (red card) 50'; Guzina (yellow card) 75'; Tatayev (yellow card) 86'	Stadium: Solidarnost Samara Arena; Attendance: 7,014; Referee: Sergey Cheban

4 March 2026	Rostov	0–2	Dynamo Makhachkala	Rostov-on-Don
18:30	Langovich (red card) 28'; Bayramyan (yellow card) 53'; Melyokhin (yellow card) 83'; Chistyakov (yellow card) 90+2'	Report	Mrezigue 39'; El Moubarik 45+3'; Serderov (yellow card) 54'; Tabidze (yellow card) 72'	Stadium: Rostov Arena; Attendance: 7,670; Referee: Vladimir Moskalyov

5 March 2026	Arsenal Tula (2)	1–2	Lokomotiv Moscow	Khimki
18:30	Botaka (yellow card) 27'; Bolshakov 45'; Putsko (yellow card) 50'	Report	Morozov 32'; Karpukas 35' (yellow card) 49'	Stadium: Arena Khimki; Attendance: 2,464; Referee: Kirill Levnikov

== Semi-finals ==
=== RPL Path ===
Team 1	Agg.	Team 2	1st leg	2nd leg
Dynamo Moscow	5–3	Spartak Moscow	5–2	0–1
CSKA Moscow	3–5	Krasnodar	3–1	0–4

5 March 2026	Dynamo Moscow	5–2	Spartak Moscow	Moscow
20:45	Ngamaleu 6', 67'; Gusev (yellow card) 17'; Skopintsev (yellow card) 18'; Tyukavin (yellow card) 22' (goal) 73'; Rubens (yellow card) 45'; Miranchuk (yellow card) 45+2'; David Ricardo 70'; Osipenko 83'	Report	Umyarov (yellow card) 23'; Ugalde 30'; Saus (yellow card) 47'; Martins 90+2'	Stadium: VTB Arena; Attendance: 23,385; Referee: Ivan Abrosimov

18 March 2026	Spartak Moscow	1–0	Dynamo Moscow	Moscow
20:45	Ugalde (yellow card) 34'; Wooh 58'; Marquinhos (yellow card) 72'	Report	Glebov (yellow card) 70'; Ngamaleu (yellow card) 80'; Fomin (yellow card) 90+4'	Stadium: Lukoil Arena; Attendance: 34,463; Referee: Kirill Levnikov

4 March 2026	CSKA Moscow	3–1	Krasnodar	Moscow
20:45	Reis (yellow card) 36'; Gondou (yellow card) 45+4'; Glebov 54'; Krugovoy 68'; Gajić (yellow card) 70'; Alves 90+3'	Report	Cobnan 22'; Pina (yellow card) 24'; González (yellow card) 68' (yellow-red card) 72'; Douglas Augusto (yellow card) 72'; Jubal (yellow card) 73'; Chernikov (yellow card) 77'	Stadium: VEB Arena; Attendance: 18,203; Referee: Aleksey Sukhoy

17 March 2026	Krasnodar	4–0	CSKA Moscow	Krasnodar
20:45	Batxi (yellow card) 2' (goal) 51', 67'; Douglas Augusto 20' (yellow card) 55'; Córdoba 58'; Krivtsov (yellow card) 39'; Pina (yellow card) 69'	Report	João Victor (yellow card) 42'; Reis (red card) 45+1'; Moisés (yellow card) 63' (yellow-red card) 63'; Barinov (yellow card) 82'	Stadium: Ozon Arena; Attendance: 31,596; Referee: Inal Tanashev

=== Regions Path ===
==== Stage 1 ====
18 March 2026	Zenit Saint Petersburg	1–0	Dynamo Makhachkala	Saint Petersburg
18:15	Durán 45+8' (pen.); Barrios (yellow card) 46'	Report	Kagermazov (yellow card) 37'; Zinovich (yellow card) 51'	Stadium: Gazprom Arena; Attendance: 22,477; Referee: Pavel Kukuyan

19 March 2026	Krylia Sovetov Samara	2–2 (5–4 p)	Lokomotiv Moscow	Samara
18:30	Pyachenin (yellow card) 37'; Oleynikov 40'; Akhmetov 45'; Chinedu (yellow card) 56'; Costanza (yellow card) 85'; Khubulov (yellow card) 90+4'	Report	Batrakov (yellow card) 20'; Komlichenko 38' (pen.); Silyanov 58'	Stadium: Solidarnost Samara Arena; Attendance: 14,720; Referee: Vladimir Moskalyov
	Penalties
	Banjac (penalty scored); Galdames (penalty scored); Oleynikov (penalty scored); Costanza (penalty scored); Pyachenin (penalty scored)		(penalty scored) Komlichenko; (penalty missed) Vorobyov; (penalty scored) Batrakov; (penalty scored) Sarveli; (penalty scored) Morozov

==== Stage 2 ====
7 April 2026	Krylia Sovetov Samara	2–5	CSKA Moscow	Samara
18:00	Oleynikov 53'; Lepsky 84'	Report	Gondou 4', 35', 51'; Oblyakov 64'; Kislyak 67'	Stadium: Solidarnost Samara Arena; Attendance: 24,902; Referee: Sergey Ivanov

8 April 2026	Zenit Saint Petersburg	0–0 (6–7 p)	Spartak Moscow	Saint Petersburg
20:45	Luiz Henrique (yellow card) 42'	Report	Solari (yellow card) 31'; Denisov (yellow card) 34'; Djiku (yellow card) 72'	Stadium: Gazprom Arena; Attendance: 52,120; Referee: Artyom Chistyakov
	Penalties
	Glushenkov (penalty scored); Sobolev (penalty scored); Mostovoy (penalty missed); Jhon Jhon (penalty scored); Diveyev (penalty scored); Alip (penalty scored); Santos (penalty scored); Kondakov (penalty missed)		(penalty scored) Djiku; (penalty scored) Umyarov; (penalty scored) Fernandes; (penalty missed) Ugalde; (penalty scored) Marquinhos; (penalty scored) Martins; (penalty scored) Dmitriyev; (penalty scored) Wooh

== Finals ==
=== RPL Path ===
Team 1	Agg.	Team 2	1st leg	2nd leg
Dynamo Moscow	0–0 (5–6 p)	Krasnodar	0–0	0–0

8 April 2026	Dynamo Moscow	0–0	Krasnodar	Moscow
18:15	Cáceres (yellow card) 24'; Ngamaleu (yellow card) 52'; Miranchuk (yellow card) 71'	Report	Olaza (yellow card) 17'; Musayev (yellow card) 19'; Chernikov (yellow card) 28' (red card) 90'; Paltsev (yellow card) 42'	Stadium: VTB Arena; Attendance: 22,694; Referee: Ivan Abrosimov

7 May 2026	Krasnodar	0–0 (6–5 p)	Dynamo Moscow	Krasnodar
20:30	González (yellow card) 27'; Pina (yellow card) 75'	Report	Skopintsev (yellow card) 26'	Stadium: Ozon Arena; Attendance: 33,000; Referee: Artyom Chistyakov
	Penalties
	Spertsyan (penalty scored); Olaza (penalty scored); Córdoba (penalty scored); Jubal (penalty scored); Douglas Augusto (penalty missed); Krivtsov (penalty scored); Pina (penalty scored)		(penalty scored) Skopintsev; (penalty scored) Sergeyev; (penalty scored) Chávez; (penalty scored) Gomes; (penalty missed) Tyukavin; (penalty scored) David Ricardo; (penalty missed) Cáceres

=== Regions Path ===
6 May 2026	Spartak Moscow	1–0	CSKA Moscow	Moscow
20:00	Litvinov 10' (yellow card) 40'	Report	Danilov (yellow card) 22'; Barinov (yellow card) 61'; Oblyakov (yellow card) 65'; João Victor (yellow card) 69'	Stadium: Lukoil Arena; Attendance: 38,911; Referee: Kirill Levnikov

== Superfinal ==
24 May 2026	Spartak Moscow	1–1 (4–3 p)	Krasnodar	Moscow
18:00 MSK (UTC+3)	Solari 37'; Martins (yellow card) 45'; Umyarov (yellow card) 59'; Denisov (yellow card) 90+2'	Report	Tormena (yellow card) 45+2'; Olaza (yellow card) 45+3'; Costa (yellow card) 52'; Batxi (yellow card) 52'; Augusto 57'; Douglas Augusto (yellow card) 66'; Spertsyan (yellow card) 80'	Stadium: Luzhniki Stadium; Attendance: 72,978; Referee: Inal Tanashev
	Penalties
	Dmitriyev (penalty scored); Umyarov (penalty scored); Wooh (penalty scored); Barco (penalty scored)		(penalty scored) Spertsyan; (penalty scored) Olaza; (penalty scored) Krivtsov; (penalty missed) Boselli; (penalty missed) Pina

== Notes ==
Akron: Akron Tolyatti played their Russian Cup home matches at the Solidarnost Samara Arena, in Samara, instead of their regular venue, the Kristall Stadium, in Zhigulevsk.

Kristall-MEZT: Kristall-MEZT played their Russian Cup home match at the Fakel Stadium, in Voronezh, instead of their regular venue, the SK Borisoglebskiy Stadium, in Borisoglebsk.

Salyut: Salyut played their Russian Cup home matches at the Spartak Stadium, in Stary Oskol, instead of their regular venue, the Salyut Stadium, in Belgorod, due to different problems, related to Russian invasion of Ukraine.
