= Bobyor =

Bobyor (Russian: Бобёр) is a Russian surname literally meaning "beaver". Notable people with this surname include:

- Anton Bobyor (born 1982), Russian football player
- Ivan Bobyor (born 2006), Russian football player
