= Ivan Belikov =

Ivan Belikov may refer to:

- Ivan Belikov (footballer, born 1996), Russian footballer who plays as a midfielder
- Ivan Belikov (footballer, born 2004), Russian footballer who plays as a defender
