= Andrés Alarcón =

Andrés Alarcón may refer to:

- Andrés Alarcón (tennis)
- Andrés Alarcón (footballer)
