= Maksim Savelyev =

Russian footballer

Personal information
- Full name: Maksim Dmitriyevich Savelyev
- Date of birth: 22 January 2002 (age 24)
- Place of birth: Nizhny Novgorod, Russia
- Height: 1.88 m (6 ft 2 in)
- Position: Forward

Team information
- Current team: Orenburg
- Number: 9

Youth career
- –2015: Sokol Saratov
- 2015–2016: Dynamo Moscow
- 2016–2017: Rubin Kazan
- 2017–2018: Chertanovo Moscow

Senior career*
Years	Team	Apps	(Gls)
2018–2023	Chertanovo Moscow	71	(19)
2018–2019	→ Chertanovo-2 Moscow	13	(1)
2023–2025	Yenisey Krasnoyarsk	53	(9)
2025–	Orenburg	36	(3)

International career
2017	Russia U-15	5	(1)
2017–2018	Russia U-16	10	(3)
- * Club domestic league appearances and goals as of 21 November 2026

Maksim Dmitriyevich Savelyev (Russian: Максим Дмитриевич Савельев; born 22 January 2002) is a Russian football player who plays for Orenburg.

== Club career ==
He made his debut in the Russian Football National League for Chertanovo Moscow on 8 August 2020 in a game against Tom Tomsk, he substituted Ilya Molteninov in the 64th minute.

On 18 February 2025, Savelyev signed with Orenburg of the Russian Premier League. He made his RPL debut for Orenburg on 2 March 2025 against Spartak Moscow.

== Career statistics ==
As of 21 November 2026

Club	Season	League			Cup		Other		Total	
Club	Season	Division	Apps	Goals	Apps	Goals	Apps	Goals	Apps	Goals
Chertanovo-2 Moscow	2018–19	Russian Second League	13	1	–		–		13	1
Chertanovo Moscow	2019–20	Russian First League	0	0	–		1 (Note: Appearance in the FNL Cup)	0	1	0
Chertanovo Moscow	2020–21	Russian First League	17	1	2	0	–		19	1
Chertanovo Moscow	2021–22	Russian Second League	24	7	1	0	–		25	7
Chertanovo Moscow	2022–23	Russian Second League	30	11	2	0	–		32	11
Chertanovo Moscow	Total		71	19	5	0	1	0	77	19
Yenisey Krasnoyarsk	2023–24	Russian First League	33	5	1	0	–		34	5
Yenisey Krasnoyarsk	2024–25	Russian First League	20	4	0	0	–		20	4
Yenisey Krasnoyarsk	Total		53	9	1	0	0	0	54	9
Orenburg	2024–25	Russian Premier League	12	0	–		–		12	0
Orenburg	2025–26	Russian Premier League	22	3	5	1	–		27	4
Orenburg	2026–27	Russian Premier League	2	0	1	0	–		3	0
Orenburg	Total		36	3	6	1	0	0	42	4
Career total			173	32	12	1	1	0	186	33
