= Kazbek Mukailov =

Russian footballer (born 2007)

Personal information
- Full name: Kazbek Arslanbekovich Mukailov
- Date of birth: 1 June 2007 (age 19)
- Place of birth: Makhachkala, Russia
- Height: 1.90 m (6 ft 3 in)
- Position: Centre-forward

Team information
- Current team: Krylia Sovetov Samara (on loan from Krasnodar)
- Number: 67

Youth career
- –2019: RDYuSSh Makhachkala
- 2019–2026: Krasnodar

Senior career*
| Years | Team | Apps | (Gls) |
| 2025– | Krasnodar | 2 | (0) |
| 2026– | → Krylia Sovetov Samara (loan) | 8 | (1) |

International career^{‡}
| 2023 | Russia U17 | 2 | (0) |
| 2024–2025 | Russia U18 | 5 | (4) |
| 2025 | Russia U19 | 3 | (0) |
| 2025– | Russia U21 | 3 | (1) |
- * Club domestic league appearances and goals as of 20 November 2026 ‡ National team caps and goals as of 18 November 2025

Kazbek Arslanbekovich Mukailov (Russian: Казбек Арсланбекович Мукаилов; born 1 June 2007) is a Russian football player who plays as a centre-forward for Krylia Sovetov Samara on loan from Krasnodar.

== Career ==
Mukailov made his senior debut for Krasnodar on 13 August 2025 in a Russian Cup game against Dynamo Moscow and scored twice in a 4–0 away victory.

He made his Russian Premier League debut for Krasnodar on 13 September 2025 in a game against Akron Tolyatti.

On 20 August 2026, Mukailov was loaned to Krylia Sovetov Samara for the rest of the 2026–27 season.

== Career statistics ==
As of 20 November 2026

| Club | Season | League | | | Cup | | Total | |
| Club | Season | Division | Apps | Goals | Apps | Goals | Apps | Goals |
|---|---|---|---|---|---|---|---|---|
| Krasnodar | 2025–26 | Russian Premier League | 2 | 0 | 6 | 2 | 8 | 2 |
| Krasnodar | 2026–27 | Russian Premier League | 0 | 0 | 2 | 1 | 2 | 1 |
| Krasnodar | Total | | 2 | 0 | 8 | 3 | 10 | 3 |
| Krylia Sovetov Samara (loan) | 2026–27 | Russian Premier League | 8 | 1 | 3 | 0 | 11 | 1 |
| Career total | | | 10 | 1 | 11 | 3 | 21 | 4 |
