= Viktor Okishor =

Moldovan-born Russian footballer (born 2006)

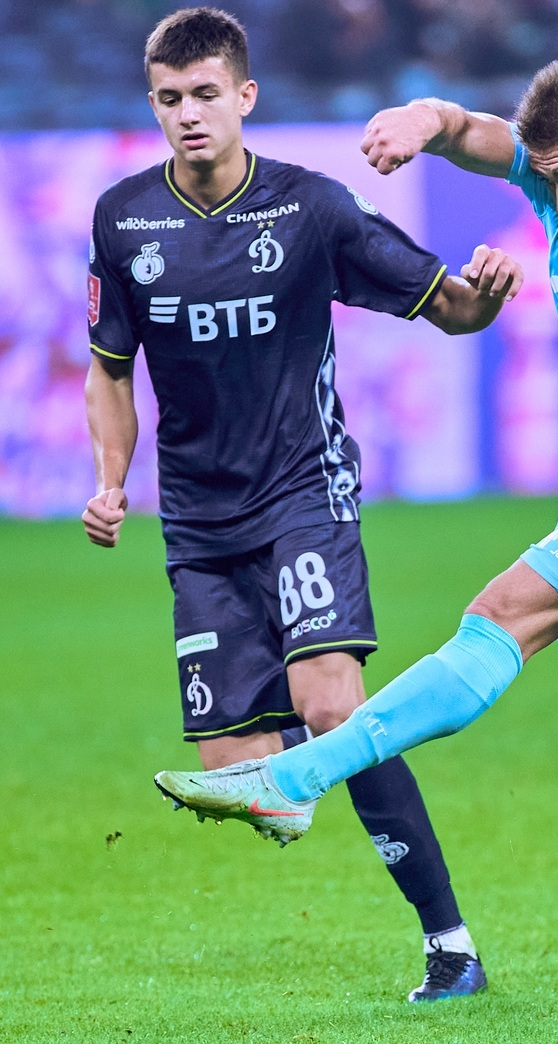
- Okishor with Dynamo Moscow in 2025

Personal information
- Full name: Viktor Ionovich Okishor
- Date of birth: 30 December 2006 (age 19)
- Place of birth: Șuri, Moldova
- Height: 1.85 m (6 ft 1 in)
- Position: Attacking midfielder

Team information
- Current team: Dynamo Moscow
- Number: 88

Youth career
- Dynamo Moscow

Senior career*
Years	Team	Apps	(Gls)
2022–	Dynamo-2 Moscow	54	(10)
2024–	Dynamo Moscow	23	(4)

International career^{‡}
2022–2023	Russia U17	5	(3)
2023	Russia U18	3	(0)
2024	Russia U19	4	(0)
2025–	Russia U21	7	(1)
- * Club domestic league appearances and goals as of 24 October 2026 ‡ National team caps and goals as of 30 March 2026

Viktor Ionovich Okishor (Russian: Виктор Ионович Окишор; born 30 December 2006) is a Russian football player who plays as an attacking midfielder for Dynamo Moscow.

== Club career ==
Okishor made his debut in the Russian Premier League for Dynamo Moscow on 20 July 2024 in a game against Fakel Voronezh.

On 28 August 2024, Okishor scored twice and assisted on another goal in a Russian Cup 5–1 Dynamo victory over Krylia Sovetov Samara. He scored his first Russian Premier League goal on 29 March 2025 against Orenburg.

In September 2026, Okishor scored for Dynamo in two consecutive games for the first time, both times coming off the bench, a winning goal in the 8th minute of added time of the 1–0 win against Orenburg and then a goal against Rostov.

On 16 October 2026, Okishor extended his Dynamo contract to June 2030.

== Career statistics ==
As of match played 27 October 2026

Appearances and goals by club, season and competition
Club	Season	League			Cup		Total	
Club	Season	Division	Apps	Goals	Apps	Goals	Apps	Goals
Dynamo-2 Moscow	2022–23	Russian Second League	10	0	—		10	0
Dynamo-2 Moscow	2023	Russian Second League B	10	2	—		10	2
Dynamo-2 Moscow	2024	Russian Second League B	20	4	—		20	4
Dynamo-2 Moscow	2024–25	Russian Second League A	5	1	—		5	1
Dynamo-2 Moscow	2025–26	Russian Second League A	9	3	—		9	3
Dynamo-2 Moscow	Total		54	10	—		54	10
Dynamo Moscow	2024–25	Russian Premier League	8	1	4	2	12	3
Dynamo Moscow	2025–26	Russian Premier League	7	0	5	0	12	0
Dynamo Moscow	2026–27	Russian Premier League	8	3	5	1	13	4
Dynamo Moscow	Total		23	4	14	3	37	7
Career total			77	14	14	3	91	17
