= Dmitry Pestryakov =

Russian footballer (born 2006)

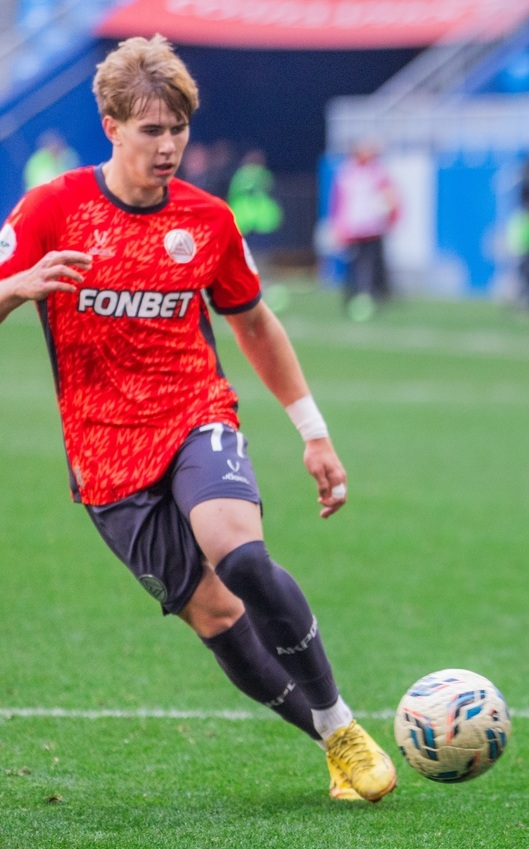
- Pestryakov with Akron in 2025

Personal information
- Full name: Dmitry Aleksandrovich Pestryakov
- Date of birth: 8 December 2006 (age 19)
- Place of birth: Kamenka, Kamensky District, Penza Oblast, Russia
- Height: 1.76 m (5 ft 9 in)
- Position: Forward

Team information
- Current team: Akron Tolyatti
- Number: 71

Youth career
- –2019: DYuSSh №1 Kamenka
- 2019–2023: Akron — Konoplyov football academy

Senior career*
Years	Team	Apps	(Gls)
2023–	Akron Tolyatti	53	(7)
2023–2024	→ Akron-2 Tolyatti	17	(1)

International career^{‡}
2024	Russia U-19	2	(1)
2025–	Russia U-21	6	(2)
- * Club domestic league appearances and goals as of 21 November 2026 ‡ National team caps and goals as of 30 March 2026

Dmitry Aleksandrovich Pestryakov (Russian: Дмитрий Александрович Пестряков; born 8 December 2006) is a Russian footballer who plays as a forward for Akron Tolyatti.

== Club career ==
On 5 September 2019, he transferred to Akron - Yuri Konoplev Football Academy (formerly the Yuri Konoplev Football Academy).

He made his debut in the Russian Second League for Akron-2 Tolyatti on 19 July 2023 in a game against Nosta Novotroitsk.

He made his debut in the Russian First League for Akron Tolyatti on 18 March 2024 in a game against Sokol Saratov.

On 21 April 2024, he extended his contract with the club.

Following the 2023–24 season, the club won bronze in the championship and, having won the play-off matches, entered the Russian Premier League.

He made his debut in the Russian Premier League for Akron Tolyatti on 15 September 2024 in a game against Khimki.

== Career statistics ==
As of 21 November 2026

Club	Season	League			Cup		Other		Total	
Club	Season	Division	Apps	Goals	Apps	Goals	Apps	Goals	Apps	Goals
Akron Tolyatti	2023–24	Russian First League	2	0	0	0	0	0	2	0
Akron Tolyatti	2024–25	Russian Premier League	17	2	6	0	–		23	2
Akron Tolyatti	2025–26	Russian Premier League	29	5	1	1	2 (Note: Appearance in relegation play-offs)	0	32	6
Akron Tolyatti	2026–27	Russian Premier League	5	0	2	0	–		7	0
Akron Tolyatti	Total		53	7	9	1	2	0	64	8
Akron-2 Tolyatti	2023	Russian Second League B	16	1	–		–		16	1
Akron-2 Tolyatti	2024	Russian Second League B	1	0	–		–		1	0
Akron-2 Tolyatti	Total		17	1	0	0	0	0	17	1
Career total			70	8	9	1	2	0	81	9
