= Aleksandr Deryugin =

Russian footballer (born 2004)

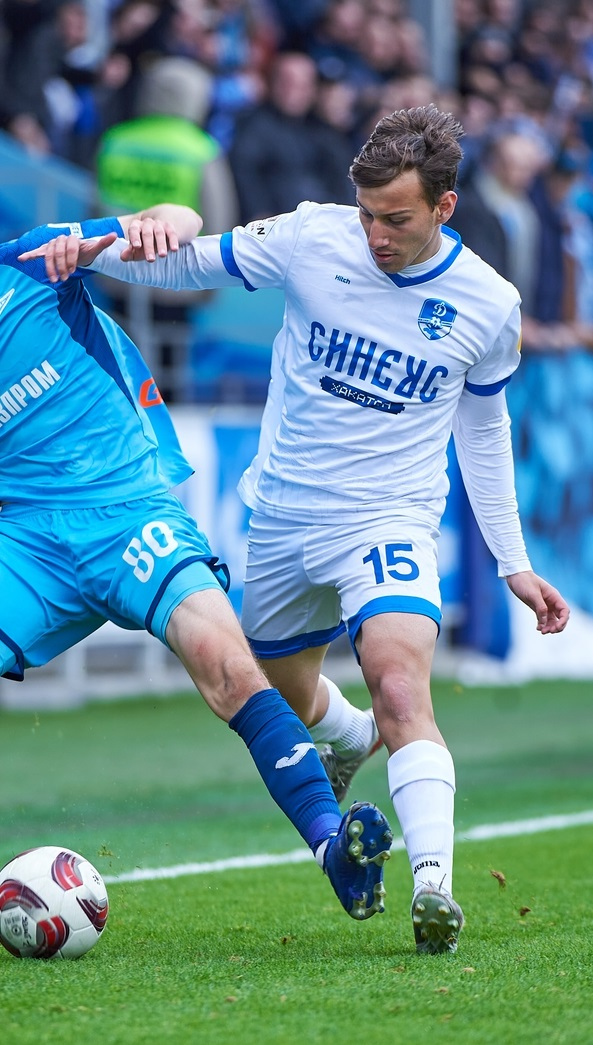
- Deryugin with Dynamo Vologda in 2024

Personal information
- Full name: Aleksandr Ivanovich Deryugin
- Date of birth: 22 March 2004 (age 22)
- Place of birth: Pavlovskaya, Krasnodar Krai, Russia
- Height: 1.79 m (5 ft 10 in)
- Position: Attacking midfielder

Team information
- Current team: Sibir Novosibirsk
- Number: 53

Youth career
- –2021: Football academy Krasnodar
- 2022–2023: Sochi

Senior career*
Years	Team	Apps	(Gls)
2023–2024	Sochi	0	(0)
2024	→ Dynamo Vologda (loan)	15	(1)
2024–2026	KAMAZ Naberezhnye Chelny	49	(2)
2026–	Sibir Novosibirsk	10	(0)
- * Club domestic league appearances and goals as of 15 November 2026

Aleksandr Ivanovich Deryugin (Russian: Александр Иванович Дерюгин; born 22 March 2004) is a Russian footballer who plays for Sibir Novosibirsk.

== Career ==
Deryugin made his debut for Sochi on 9 August 2023 in a Russian Cup game against Orenburg.

He made his debut for Dynamo Vologda on 7 April 2024 in a Russian Second League game against Rodina-M Moscow.

He made his debut for KAMAZ Naberezhnye Chelny on 4 August 2024 in a Russian First League game against Rodina Moscow.
