= Daniil Shabalin =

Russian footballer

Personal information
- Full name: Daniil Vladimirovich Shabalin
- Date of birth: 1 January 1998 (age 28)
- Place of birth: Kaliningrad, Russian SFSR
- Height: 1.81 m (5 ft 11 in)
- Positions: Left midfielder; right midfielder

Youth career
- –2017: Baltika Kaliningrad

Senior career*
Years	Team	Apps	(Gls)
2018–2020	Baltika Kaliningrad	6	(0)
2019–2020	→ Murom (loan)	14	(1)
2020–2022	Murom	58	(4)
2022–2023	Spartak Kostroma	14	(2)
2023–2024	Luki-Energiya Velikiye Luki	42	(7)
- * Club domestic league appearances and goals as of 3 November 2024

Daniil Vladimirovich Shabalin (Russian: Даниил Владимирович Шабалин; born 3 January 1998) is a Russian professional football player who plays as a left midfielder or right midfielder.

== Club career ==
He made his Russian Football National League debut for FC Baltika Kaliningrad on 4 August 2018 in a game against FC Luch Vladivostok.
