= Maksim Gaidukov =

Russian footballer

Personal information
- Full name: Maksim Andreyevich Gaidukov
- Date of birth: 6 March 1995 (age 31)
- Place of birth: Volgograd, Russia
- Height: 1.76 m (5 ft 9 in)
- Position: Midfielder

Senior career*
Years	Team	Apps	(Gls)
2014	FC Dolgoprudny-2 Dolgoprudny		
2014–2015	FC Rotor Volgograd	5	(0)
2015–2016	FC Sakhalin Yuzhno-Sakhalinsk	13	(1)
2016	FC Volgar Astrakhan	0	(0)
2017	FC Nosta Novotroitsk	8	(0)
2017–2018	FC Zenit Penza	17	(1)
2018–2019	FC Znamya Truda Orekhovo-Zuyevo	23	(8)
2019–2020	FC Tekstilshchik Ivanovo	22	(2)
2020	FC Zenit Irkutsk	12	(1)
2021	FC Forte Taganrog	26	(1)
2022	FC Avangard Kursk	12	(2)
2022–2023	FC Metallurg Lipetsk	32	(5)
2023–2024	FC Dynamo Bryansk	15	(0)
- * Club domestic league appearances and goals

Maksim Andreyevich Gaidukov (Russian: Максим Андреевич Гайдуков; born 6 March 1995) is a Russian former football player.

== Club career ==
He made his professional debut in the Russian Professional Football League for FC Rotor Volgograd on 19 September 2014 in a game against FC Terek-2 Grozny.

He made his Russian Football National League debut for FC Tekstilshchik Ivanovo on 7 July 2019 in a game against FC Yenisey Krasnoyarsk.
