= Fakel Stadium =

Football stadium in Voronezh, Russia

- Interactive map of Fakel Stadium
- Location: Marshak Street, 1A, Voronezh, Russia
- Coordinates: 51°39′04″N 39°08′50″E
- Operator: The Association Football Club Fakel
- Capacity: 10,052
- Surface: Grass

Construction
- Opened: 1986; 2024

Tenants
- Fakel Voronezh; Fakel Voronezh U19

The Fakel Stadium (Russian: Стадион «Факел») is a soccer stadium in Voronezh, Russia. It was built on the site of the Fakel football stadium, which opened in 1986 and was for a long time owned by the Design Bureau of Chemical Automation. The stadium’s stands were constructed in 1989.

From 2024 it was used as an arena for football Russian Premier League matches by Fakel Voronezh. The stadium holds 10,052 people.

== History ==
In 2003, the stadium hosted international matches. Voronezh was the venue for the group stage of the 2003–04 UEFA Women's Cup, where FC Energy Voronezh competed against Foroni Verona, ZNK Osijek, and Femina Budapest.

=== Reconstruction ===
On 19 June 2024, BelinzhiniringstroyInvest announced the completion of the facility after reconstruction, and on the same day, it was registered in the cadastre.

On 23 July 2024, the stadium was granted a license by The Stadium Certification Commission of the Russian Football Union to host matches and was awarded the first category. This allowed the football club Fakel to host matches of the Russian Premier League and the Russian Cup for the 2024/25 season at this stadium.

On 27 July 2024, the stadium officially opened with a match of the Russian Premier League between Fakel (Voronezh) and Akron Tolyatti (0:2).

== Design ==
The stadium has four stands.

The pitch of the new stadium (2024) has an artificial surface.
