= Román Vega =

Argentine footballer

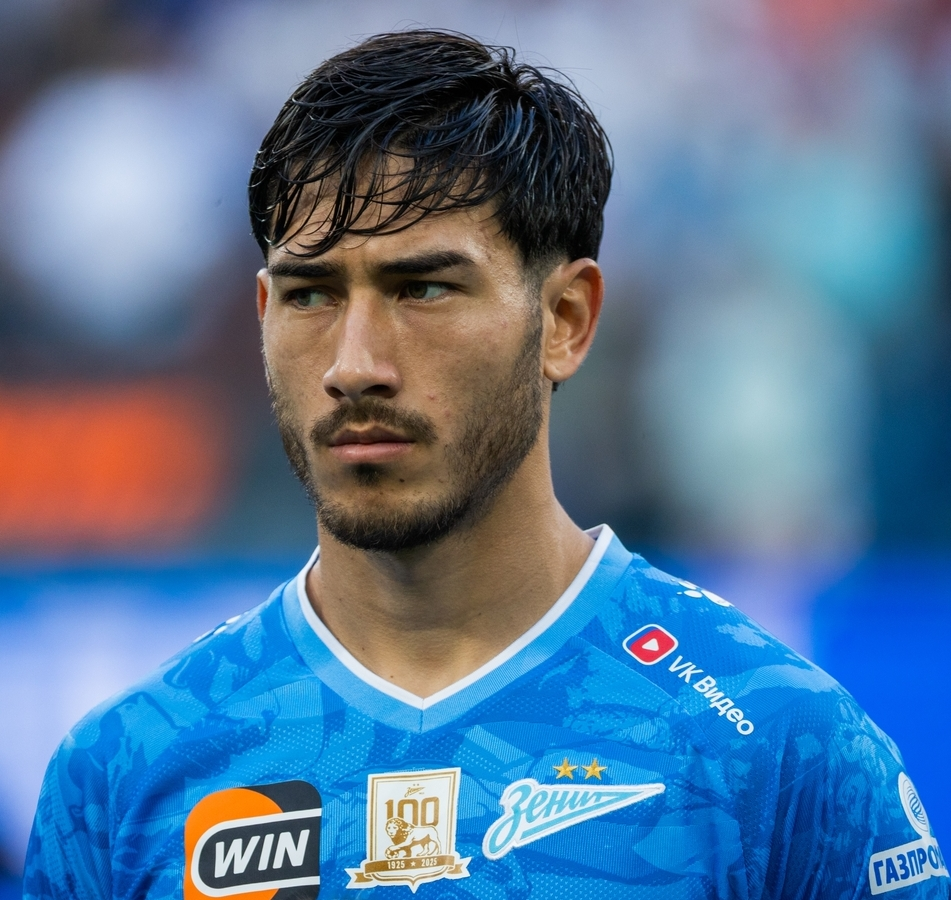
- Vega with Zenit Saint Petersburg in 2025

Personal information
- Full name: Román Gabriel Vega
- Date of birth: 1 January 2004 (age 22)
- Place of birth: Buenos Aires, Argentina
- Height: 1.77 m (5 ft 10 in)
- Position: Left-back

Team information
- Current team: Zenit Saint Petersburg
- Number: 66

Senior career*
Years	Team	Apps	(Gls)
2021–2025	Argentinos Juniors	36	(1)
2022–2023	→ Barcelona B (loan)	17	(0)
2025–	Zenit Saint Petersburg	26	(0)

International career^{‡}
2022–2023	Argentina U20	5	(1)
2024	Argentina U23	2	(0)
2026–	Argentina	3	(0)
- * Club domestic league appearances and goals as of 21 November 2026 ‡ National team caps and goals as of 17 November 2026

Román Gabriel Vega (born 1 January 2004) is an Argentine professional footballer who plays as a left-back for Russian Premier League club Zenit Saint Petersburg and the Argentina national team.

== Club career ==
Vega started his career with Argentine top flight side Argentinos Juniors. In 2022, he was sent on loan to Barcelona Atlètic in the Spanish third tier.

On 3 July 2025, Vega signed a five-year contract with Zenit Saint Petersburg in Russia.

== International career ==
On 30 September 2026, Vega made his debut with the Argentina national team in a 4–0 friendly win against Bolivia.

== Career statistics ==
=== Club ===
As of match played 21 November 2026

Appearances and goals by club, season and competition
Club	Season	League			National cup (Note: Includes Copa Argentina, Russian Cup)		Continental		Other		Total	
Club	Season	Division	Apps	Goals	Apps	Goals	Apps	Goals	Apps	Goals	Apps	Goals
Argentinos Juniors	2021	Argentine Primera División	1	0	—		—		1 (Note: Appearances in Copa de la Liga Profesional)	0	2	0
Argentinos Juniors	2022	Argentine Primera División	1	0	—		—		—		1	0
Argentinos Juniors	2023	Argentine Primera División	0	0	—		—		5	0	5	0
Argentinos Juniors	2024	Argentine Primera División	22	0	2	0	3 (Note: Appearances in Copa Sudamericana)	0	13 (Note: Eleven appearances in Copa de la Liga Profesional, two appearances in Copa de la Liga Profesional play-offs)	0	40	0
Argentinos Juniors	2025	Argentine Primera División	12	1	1	0	—		2 (Note: Appearances in Torneo Apertura play-offs)	0	15	1
Argentinos Juniors	Total		36	1	3	0	3	0	21	0	65	1
Barcelona B (loan)	2022–23	Primera Federación	17	0	—		—		—		17	0
Zenit Saint Petersburg	2025–26	Russian Premier League	14	0	9	0	—		—		23	0
Zenit Saint Petersburg	2026–27	Russian Premier League	12	0	4	0	—		1 (Note: Appearance in Russian Super Cup)	0	17	0
Zenit Saint Petersburg	Total		26	0	13	0	0	0	1	0	40	0
Career total			79	1	16	0	3	0	22	0	120	1

== Honours ==
Zenit Saint Petersburg

- Russian Premier League: 2025–26
- Russian Super Cup: 2026
