= Kirill Stepanov =

Russian footballer (born 2006)

Personal information
- Full name: Kirill Yuryevich Stepanov
- Date of birth: 4 August 2006 (age 20)
- Place of birth: Kaliningrad, Russia
- Height: 1.78 m (5 ft 10 in)
- Position: Centre-forward

Team information
- Current team: Sibir Novosibirsk (on loan from Baltika Kaliningrad)
- Number: 39

Youth career
- 2010–2017: SShOR-5 Kaliningrad
- 2017–2021: Strogino Moscow
- 2021–2022: SShOR-5 Kaliningrad
- 2023–2025: Baltika Kaliningrad

Senior career*
| Years | Team | Apps | (Gls) |
| 2023– | Baltika-2 Kaliningrad | 58 | (11) |
| 2025– | Baltika Kaliningrad | 3 | (0) |
| 2026 | → Volga Ulyanovsk (loan) | 3 | (0) |
| 2026– | → Sibir Novosibirsk (loan) | 6 | (4) |
- * Club domestic league appearances and goals as of 15 November 2026

Kirill Yuryevich Stepanov (Russian: Кирилл Юрьевич Степанов; born 4 August 2006) is a Russian football player who plays as a centre-forward for Sibir Novosibirsk on loan from Baltika Kaliningrad.

== Career ==
Stepanov made his first appearance for the senior squad of Baltika Kaliningrad on 18 September 2025 in a Russian Cup game against CSKA Moscow and scored an added-time equalizer in a 1–1 draw, he also converted his penalty kick in a subsequent shoot-out that Baltika won. He again scored on his next cup appearance against Lokomotiv Moscow.

Stepanov made his Russian Premier League debut for Baltika on 21 September 2025 in a game against Rostov.

On 11 January 2026, Stepanov extended his contract with Baltika to June 2030.

On 1 July 2026, Stepanov joined Volga Ulyanovsk on loan for the 2026–27 season. On 21 August 2026, he was recalled from the Volga loan and sent on a new loan to Sibir Novosibirsk instead.

== Career statistics ==
As of 3 March 2026

| Club | Season | League | | | Cup | | Total | |
| Club | Season | Division | Apps | Goals | Apps | Goals | Apps | Goals |
|---|---|---|---|---|---|---|---|---|
| Baltika-2 Kaliningrad | 2022–23 | Russian Second League | 9 | 0 | – | | 9 | 0 |
| Baltika-2 Kaliningrad | 2023 | Russian Second League B | 14 | 1 | – | | 14 | 1 |
| Baltika-2 Kaliningrad | 2024 | Russian Second League B | 15 | 3 | – | | 15 | 3 |
| Baltika-2 Kaliningrad | 2025 | Russian Second League B | 12 | 3 | – | | 12 | 3 |
| Baltika-2 Kaliningrad | Total | | 50 | 7 | 0 | 0 | 50 | 7 |
| Baltika Kaliningrad | 2025–26 | Russian Premier League | 3 | 0 | 4 | 2 | 7 | 2 |
| Career total | | | 53 | 7 | 4 | 2 | 57 | 9 |
