= Danila Chechyotkin =

Russian footballer (born 2000)

Personal information
- Full name: Danila Olegovich Chechyotkin
- Date of birth: 22 August 2000 (age 26)
- Place of birth: Nizhny Novgorod, Russia
- Height: 1.85 m (6 ft 1 in)
- Position: Centre back

Youth career
- –2018: FC Nizhny Novgorod

Senior career*
Years	Team	Apps	(Gls)
2018–2019	FC Nizhny Novgorod	1	(0)
2020–2021	FC Saturn Ramenskoye	24	(2)
2021–2022	FC Tekstilshchik Ivanovo	0	(0)
2021–2022	→ FC Khimik Dzerzhinsk (loan)	17	(0)
2022	FC Khimik Dzerzhinsk	13	(0)
2023	FC Khimik-Avgust Vurnary	25	(0)
2024–2025	FC Volna Nizhny Novgorod Oblast	22	(0)
- * Club domestic league appearances and goals as of 19 October 2025

Danila Olegovich Chechyotkin (Russian: Данила Олегович Чечёткин; born 22 August 2000) is a Russian football player who plays as centre-back.

== Club career ==
He made his debut in the Russian Football National League for FC Nizhny Novgorod on 11 May 2019 in a game against FC Krasnodar-2.
