= Diyego Malaniya =

Russian footballer

Personal information
- Full name: Diyego Tengizovich Malaniya
- Date of birth: 11 February 1991 (age 35)
- Place of birth: Orekhovo-Zuyevo, Russian SFSR
- Height: 1.85 m (6 ft 1 in)
- Positions: Defender; midfielder

Youth career
- FC Spartak Moscow

Senior career*
Years	Team	Apps	(Gls)
2009–2013	FC Znamya Truda Orekhovo-Zuyevo	97	(10)
2013–2016	FSK Dolgoprudny	84	(14)
2016–2017	FC Khimki	59	(1)
2018	FSK Dolgoprudny	22	(4)
2019–2021	FC Veles Moscow	55	(12)
2021	FC Volgar Astrakhan	16	(0)
2022	FC Tekstilshchik Ivanovo	12	(1)
2023	FC Znamya Truda Orekhovo-Zuyevo	27	(2)
- * Club domestic league appearances and goals

Diyego Tengizovich Malaniya (Russian: Диего Тенгизович Малания; born 11 February 1991) is a Russian former professional association football player.

== Club career ==
He made his Russian Football National League debut for FC Khimki on 11 July 2016 in a game against FC Tosno.
