= Vadim Shilov =

Russian footballer (born 2008

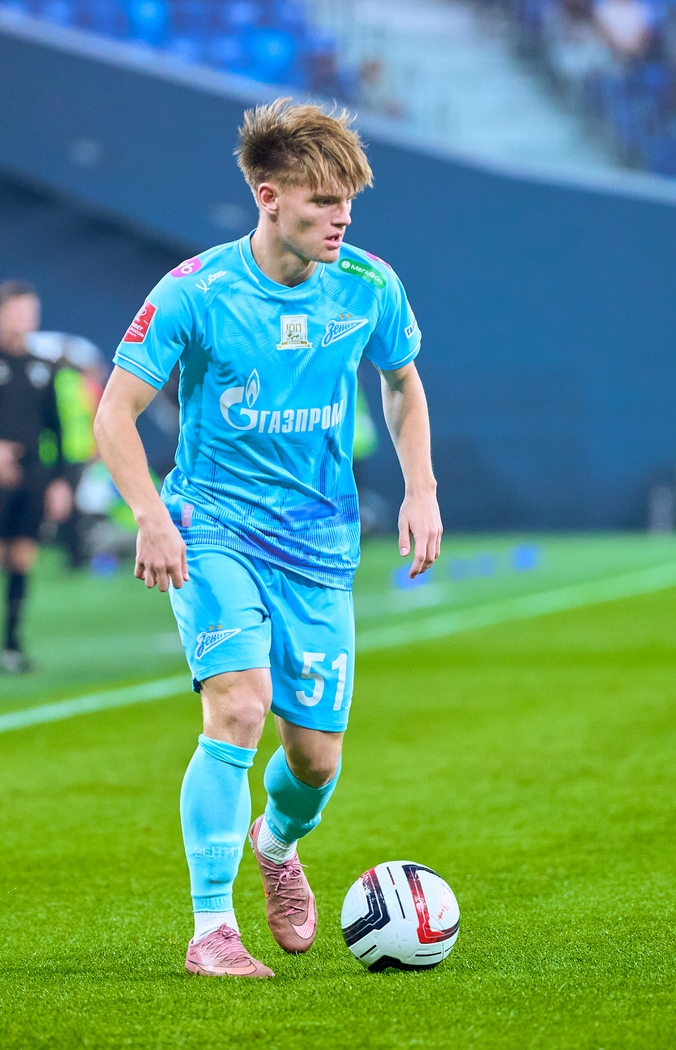
- Shilov with Zenit in 2025

Personal information
- Full name: Vadim Aleksandrovich Shilov
- Date of birth: 15 March 2008 (age 18)
- Place of birth: Belgorod, Russia
- Height: 1.74 m (5 ft 9 in)
- Position: Right winger

Team information
- Current team: Zenit St. Petersburg
- Number: 51

Youth career
- –2020: Salyut Belgorod
- 2020–: Zenit St. Petersburg

Senior career*
Years	Team	Apps	(Gls)
2025–	Zenit-2 St. Petersburg	9	(1)
2025–	Zenit St. Petersburg	3	(0)

International career^{‡}
2023	Russia U15	6	(9)
2023–2024	Russia U16	7	(3)
2024–2025	Russia U17	7	(6)
- * Club domestic league appearances and goals as of 17 October 2026 ‡ National team caps and goals as of 21 March 2025

Vadim Aleksandrovich Shilov (Russian: Вадим Александрович Шилов; born 15 March 2008) is a Russian football player who plays as a right winger for Zenit St. Petersburg.

== Career ==
Vadim Shilov was born in Belgorod, Russia. He began his youth football career with FC Salyut Belgorod, before joining Zenit St. Petersburg. With FC Zenit, Shilov became a winner of the 2024 Youth Football League-2 and a medalist of the 2022/23 Youth Football League-3. Following the 2024 Youth Football League-2 season, he was named the league’s best player and top scorer, recording 42 goals and 27 assists in 33 matches. In the 2025 Youth Football League season, Shilov made 14 appearances for Zenit, scoring 15 goals.

Shilov made his debut for the main squad of Zenit St. Petersburg on 12 August 2025 in a Russian Cup game against Rubin Kazan. He came on as a substitute in the 66th minute, 9 minutes later Zenit was awarded a penalty kick for a foul against Shilov, and in the 83rd minute Shilov scored his first goal for Zenit.

Shilov made his Russian Premier League debut for Zenit on 23 August 2025 in a game against Dynamo Makhachkala. In November 2025, he suffered an ACL injury and was not able to play for the rest of the 2025–26 season.

== Career statistics ==
As of 17 October 2026

Club	Season	League			Cup		Total	
Club	Season	Division	Apps	Goals	Apps	Goals	Apps	Goals
Zenit-2 St. Petersburg	2025	Russian Second League B	6	1	–		6	1
Zenit-2 St. Petersburg	2026	Russian Second League B	3	0	–		3	0
Zenit-2 St. Petersburg	Total		9	1	0	0	9	1
Zenit St. Petersburg	2025–26	Russian Premier League	3	0	5	2	8	2
Zenit St. Petersburg	2026–27	Russian Premier League	0	0	2	0	2	0
Zenit St. Petersburg	Total		3	0	7	2	10	2
Career total			12	1	7	2	19	3

== Honours ==
Zenit Saint Petersburg

- Russian Premier League: 2025–26

Zenit-2 Saint Petersburg

- Russian Second League Division B: 2025
- Russian Second League Division A Silver Group: 2026
