= Yevgeni Butakov =

Russian professional football player

Personal information
- Full name: Yevgeni Aleksandrovich Butakov
- Date of birth: 24 July 1998 (age 28)
- Place of birth: Usolye-Sibirskoye, Irkutsk Oblast, Russia
- Height: 1.77 m (5 ft 10 in)
- Position: Midfielder

Youth career
- 2012–2014: Baltika Kaliningrad

Senior career*
Years	Team	Apps	(Gls)
2014–2017	Baltika Kaliningrad	9	(0)
2017–2018	Sokol Saratov	24	(2)
2018	Saturn Ramenskoye	8	(0)
2020–2022	Baltika Kaliningrad	1	(0)
2020–2021	→ Belshina Bobruisk (loan)	8	(0)
2021–2022	→ Baltika-BFU Kaliningrad	26	(3)
2022–2023	Murom	42	(5)
2024–2025	Luki-Energiya Velikiye Luki	37	(3)
- * Club domestic league appearances and goals as of 2 November 2025

Yevgeni Aleksandrovich Butakov (Russian: Евгений Александрович Бутаков; born 24 July 1998) is a Russian professional football player who plays for Luki-Energiya.

== Club career ==
He made his professional debut for Baltika Kaliningrad on 2 November 2014 in a Russian Football National League match against Sibir Novosibirsk.

On 26 September 2020, he joined Belshina Bobruisk on loan. On 6 April 2021, he re-joined Belshina on a new loan until the end of 2021.
