= Maksim Polyakov =

Russian footballer

Personal information
- Full name: Maksim Eduardovich Polyakov
- Date of birth: 18 May 1999 (age 27)
- Place of birth: Yaroslavl, Russia
- Height: 1.80 m (5 ft 11 in)
- Position: Midfielder

Team information
- Current team: Tyumen
- Number: 3

Youth career
- 2016–2017: Shinnik Yaroslavl

Senior career*
Years	Team	Apps	(Gls)
2017–2021	Shinnik Yaroslavl	13	(0)
2019–2020	→ Znamya Truda (loan)	14	(0)
2021–2023	Torpedo Vladimir	44	(1)
2023	Zenit-2 St. Petersburg	17	(2)
2024	Shinnik Yaroslavl	13	(1)
2024–2026	Tekstilshchik Ivanovo	64	(2)
2026–	Tyumen	7	(0)
- * Club domestic league appearances and goals as of 17 October 2026

Maksim Eduardovich Polyakov (Russian: Максим Эдуардович Поляков; born 18 May 1999) is a Russian football player who plays for Tyumen.

== Club career ==
He made his debut in the Russian Football National League for FC Shinnik Yaroslavl on 11 April 2018 in a game against FC Sibir Novosibirsk.
