= Nikolay Koserik =

Russian footballer (born 2007)

Personal information
- Full name: Nikolay Ilyich Koserik
- Date of birth: 28 May 2007 (age 19)
- Place of birth: Saint Petersburg, Russia
- Height: 1.83 m (6 ft 0 in)
- Position: Defender

Team information
- Current team: Orenburg-2
- Number: 54

Youth career
- –2017: Zenit-84 Saint Petersburg
- 2017–2023: Zenit St. Petesburg
- 2024: Orenburg

Senior career*
Years	Team	Apps	(Gls)
2025–2026	Orenburg	2	(0)
2025–	→ Orenburg-2	24	(1)
2026	→ Mashuk-KMV Pyatigorsk (loan)	9	(0)
- * Club domestic league appearances and goals as of 1 November 2026

Nikolay Ilyich Koserik (Russian: Николай Ильич Косерик; born 28 May 2007) is a Russian football player who plays as a defensive midfielder for Orenburg-2.

== Career ==
Koserik made his debut in the Russian Premier League for Orenburg on 3 August 2025 in a game against Baltika Kaliningrad.

On 5 February 2026, Koserik moved on loan to Mashuk-KMV Pyatigorsk.

== Career statistics ==
As of 1 November 2026

Club	Season	League			Cup		Total	
Club	Season	Division	Apps	Goals	Apps	Goals	Apps	Goals
Orenburg-2	2025	Russian Second League B	9	0	—		9	0
Orenburg-2	2026	Russian Second League B	15	1	—		15	1
Orenburg-2	Total		24	1	0	0	24	1
Orenburg	2025–26	Russian Premier League	2	0	7	0	9	0
Mashuk-KMV Pyatigorsk (loan)	2025–26	Russian Second League A	9	0	—		9	0
Career total			35	1	7	0	42	1
