= Vladislav Tselovalnikov =

Russian footballer

Personal information
- Full name: Vladislav Olegovich Tselovalnikov
- Date of birth: 21 September 1991 (age 35)
- Place of birth: Astrakhan, Russian SFSR
- Height: 1.87 m (6 ft 2 in)
- Position: Goalkeeper

Senior career*
Years	Team	Apps	(Gls)
2009–2010	FC Volgar-Gazprom Astrakhan	0	(0)
2012–2013	FC Volgar Astrakhan	14	(0)
2013	FC Druzhba Maykop	5	(0)
2014–2015	FC Astrakhan	37	(0)
2016	FC MITOS Novocherkassk	8	(0)
2016	FC SKA Rostov-on-Don	4	(0)
2017	FC Smena Komsomolsk-na-Amure	3	(0)
2017–2018	Speranța Nisporeni	3	(0)
2018–2019	FC Volgar Astrakhan	2	(0)
Refereeing career
Domestic
Years	League	Role
2022–2024	Russian Second League	Referee
2024–	Russian First League	Referee
2025–	Russian Premier League	Referee
- * Club domestic league appearances and goals

Vladislav Olegovich Tselovalnikov (Russian: Владислав Олегович Целовальников; born 21 September 1991) is a Russian football referee and a former goalkeeper.

== Club career ==
He made his debut in the Russian Second Division for FC Volgar-Astrakhan Astrakhan on 31 July 2012 in a game against FC Dagdizel Kaspiysk.

== Personal ==
His father Oleg Tselovalnikov played in the Soviet Top League for FC Rotor Volgograd.
