= Nikita Gloydman =

Russian footballer

Personal information
- Full name: Nikita Igorevich Gloydman
- Date of birth: 10 January 2002 (age 24)
- Place of birth: Moscow, Russia
- Height: 1.89 m (6 ft 2 in)
- Position: Defender

Team information
- Current team: Sokol Saratov
- Number: 33

Youth career
- 2012–2015: Dynamo Moscow
- 2016–2019: Spartak Moscow
- 2020: Arsenal Tula

Senior career*
Years	Team	Apps	(Gls)
2021–2022	Arsenal Tula	0	(0)
2021	→ Khimik-Arsenal	2	(0)
2021–2022	→ Arsenal-2 Tula	24	(2)
2022–2023	Torpedo Moscow	0	(0)
2022–2023	→ Torpedo-2	37	(0)
2024	Mashuk-KMV Pyatigorsk	15	(2)
2024	Torpedo Vladimir	14	(0)
2025	Cherepovets	14	(0)
2025–	Sokol Saratov	35	(1)
- * Club domestic league appearances and goals as of 15 November 2026

Nikita Igorevich Gloydman (Russian: Никита Игоревич Глойдман; born 10 January 2002) is a Russian footballer who plays as a defender for Sokol Saratov.

== Club career ==
He made his Russian Professional Football League debut for Khimik-Arsenal on 25 May 2021 in a game against Kvant Obninsk.

He made his debut in the Russian First League for Sokol Saratov on 20 July 2025 in a game against Neftekhimik Nizhnekamsk.
