= Zorky Stadium =

Sports venue in Krasnogorsk, Russia

Coordinates: 55.82778°N 37.32611°E

- Interactive map of Zorky Stadium
- Location: Krasnogorsk, Russia
- Capacity: 8,000

Construction
- Opened: 1948

Tenant
- Zorky

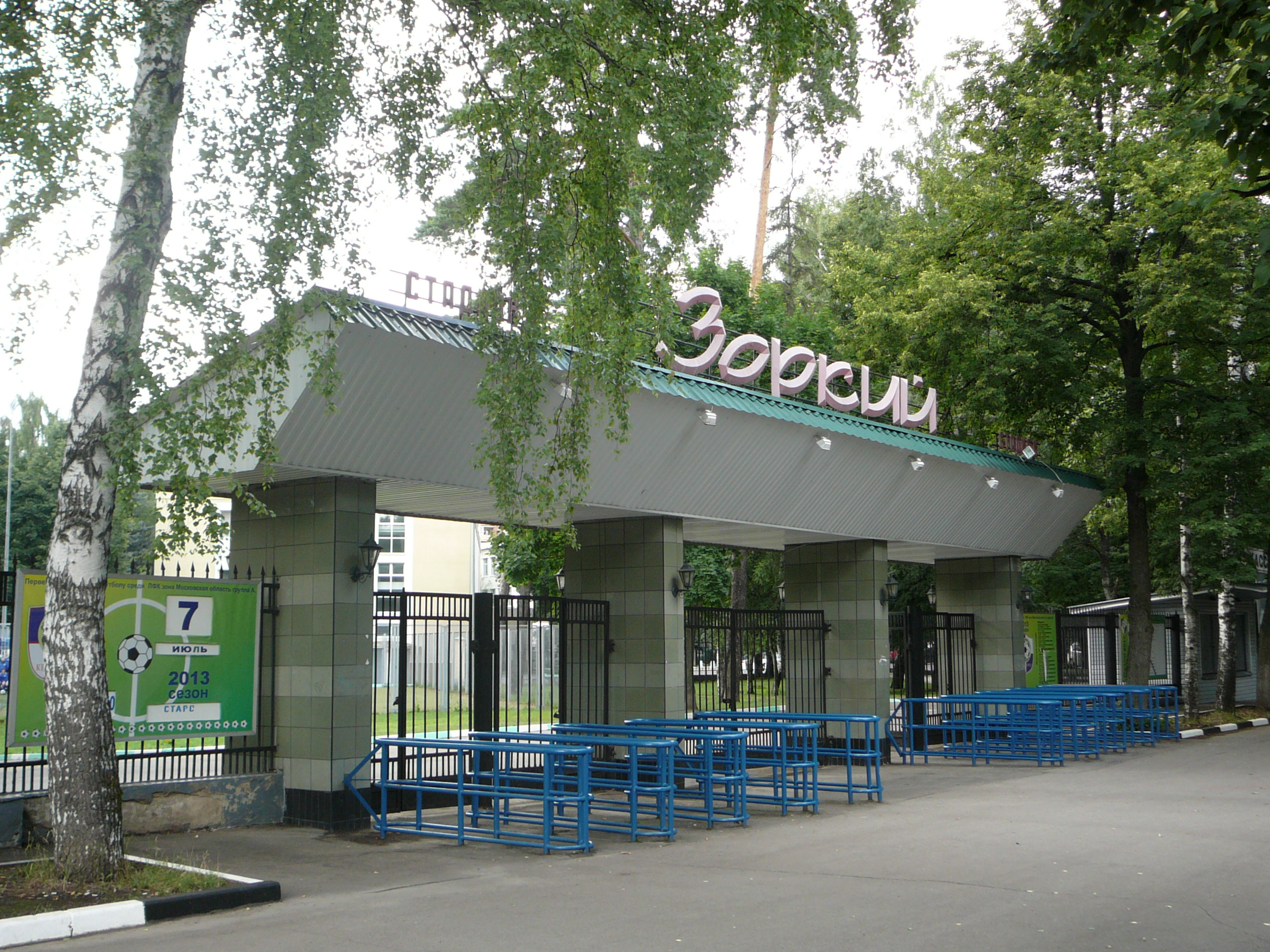
Krasnogorsk-2013 - panoramio (635).jpg

Zorky Stadium is a sports venue in Krasnogorsk, Moscow Oblast, Russia. It is the home of Zorky.
