= Rustam Sosranov =

Russian footballer

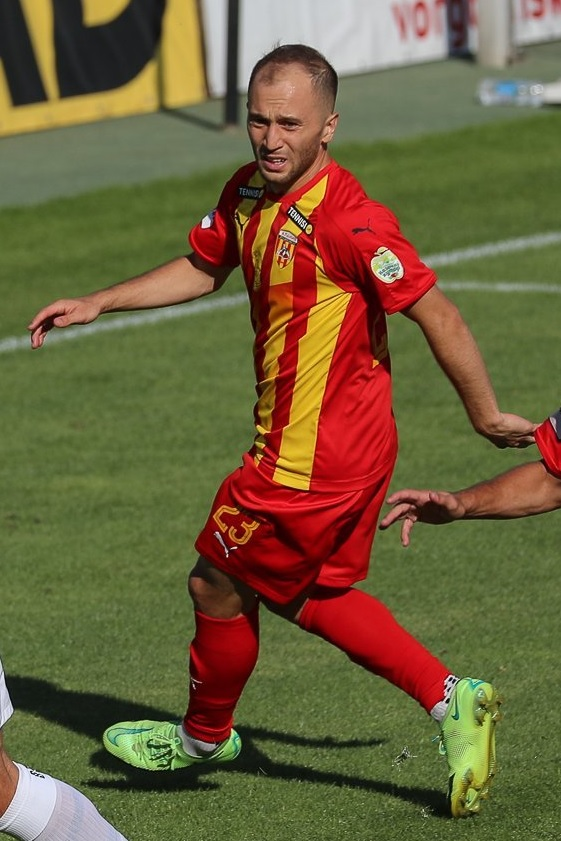
- Sosranov with Alania in 2021

Personal information
- Full name: Rustam Ruslanovich Sosranov
- Date of birth: 23 July 1994 (age 32)
- Place of birth: Vladikavkaz, Russia
- Height: 1.76 m (5 ft 9 in)
- Position: Left-back

Senior career*
Years	Team	Apps	(Gls)
2012–2013	Gubkin	21	(0)
2013–2014	Minsk	0	(0)
2015	Jelgava	21	(0)
2016	Baltika Kaliningrad	7	(1)
2016–2017	Spartak Vladikavkaz	11	(0)
2017	SKA Rostov-on-Don	15	(2)
2018	Mashuk-KMV Pyatigorsk	9	(1)
2018–2019	Olimp Khimki (amateur)		
2019–2020	Olimp Khimki	14	(2)
2020–2021	Olimp-Dolgoprudny	25	(2)
2021–2022	Alania Vladikavkaz	19	(0)
2022–2023	SKA-Khabarovsk	13	(0)
2024–2025	Veles Moscow	19	(0)
2025	Saturn Ramenskoye	14	(0)
- * Club domestic league appearances and goals as of 2 November 2025

Rustam Ruslanovich Sosranov (Russian: Рустам Русланович Сосранов; born 23 July 1994) is a Russian football player.

== Club career ==
He made his debut in the Russian Second Division for Gubkin on 29 April 2012 in a game against Podolye Podolsky district.

He made his Russian Football National League debut for Baltika Kaliningrad on 12 March 2016 in a game against Sokol Saratov.
