= Kirill Bolshakov =

Russian footballer

Personal information
- Full name: Kirill Andreyevich Bolshakov
- Date of birth: 31 March 2000 (age 26)
- Place of birth: Alchevsk, Ukraine
- Height: 1.91 m (6 ft 3 in)
- Position: Centre-back

Team information
- Current team: FC Arsenal Tula
- Number: 31

Youth career
- Stal Alchevsk

Senior career*
Years	Team	Apps	(Gls)
2019	SSh #75 Moscow		
2019–2020	FC Tambov	0	(0)
2020–2021	FC SKA-Khabarovsk	29	(2)
2021–2023	FC Khimki	0	(0)
2021	→ FC Olimp-Dolgoprudny (loan)	22	(5)
2022	→ FC Kuban Krasnodar (loan)	13	(3)
2022–2023	→ FC Arsenal Tula (loan)	20	(1)
2023–	FC Arsenal Tula	76	(6)
- * Club domestic league appearances and goals as of 16 May 2026

Kirill Andreyevich Bolshakov (Russian: Кирилл Андреевич Большаков; born 31 March 2000) is a Russian football player who plays as a centre-back for FC Arsenal Tula.

== Club career ==
He made his debut in the Russian Football National League for FC SKA-Khabarovsk on 1 August 2020 in a game against Alania Vladikavkaz, as a starter.

On 22 June 2021, he signed with Russian Premier League club FC Khimki. On 13 July 2022, Bolshakov was loaned to FC Arsenal Tula.
