= Andrés Alarcón (footballer) =

Colombian footballer (born 2001)

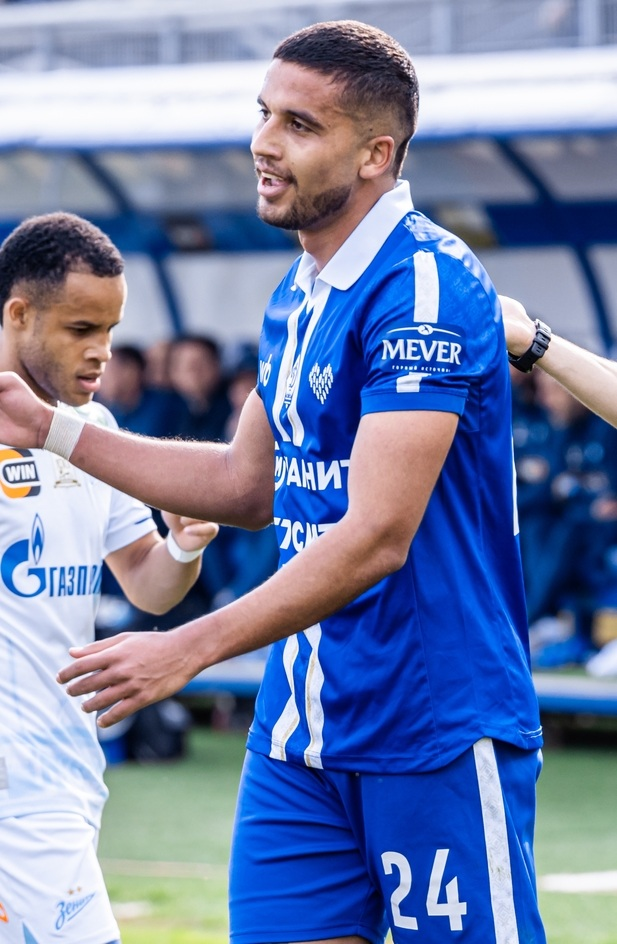
- Alarcón with Dynamo Makhachkala in 2026

Personal information
- Full name: Andrés Mauricio Alarcón Mendoza
- Date of birth: 19 May 2001 (age 25)
- Place of birth: Barranquilla, Colombia
- Height: 1.91 m (6 ft 3 in)
- Position: Defender

Team information
- Current team: Dynamo Makhachkala
- Number: 24

Youth career
- –2022: Argentinos Juniors
- 2023: Patriotas

Senior career*
Years	Team	Apps	(Gls)
2023–2026	Patriotas	54	(6)
2025	→ Deportivo Pasto (loan)	25	(4)
2025–2026	→ Dynamo Makhachkala (loan)	14	(0)
2026–	Dynamo Makhachkala	15	(1)

International career^{‡}
2024	Colombia U23	1	(0)
- * Club domestic league appearances and goals as of 22 November 2026 ‡ National team caps and goals as of 2 February 2024

Andrés Mauricio Alarcón Mendoza (born 19 May 2001) is a Colombian professional footballer who plays as a defender for Russian Premier League club Dynamo Makhachkala.

== Early life ==
Alarcón was born on 19 May 2001. Born in Barranquilla, Colombia, he grew up in Ibagué, Colombia.

== Career ==
As a youth player, Alarcón joined the youth academy of Argentine side Argentinos Juniors. Following his stint there, he joined the youth academy of Colombian side Patriotas in 2023 and was promoted to the club's senior team the same year, helping them achieve promotion from the second tier to the top flight.

Ahead of the 2025 season, he was sent on loan to Colombian side Deportivo Pasto, where he made twenty-five league appearances and scored four goals. During the summer of 2025, he was sent on loan to Russian side Dynamo Makhachkala. On 9 July 2026, Dynamo made the transfer permanent and signed a three-year contract with Alarcón.

== Style of play ==
Alarcón plays as a defender and is right-footed. Colombian news website Revista La Liga wrote in 2023 "due to his height, he's often been deployed as a center back, and the position doesn't bother him, but he prefers to be more advanced".

== Career statistics ==
As of 22 November 2026

Club	Season	League			Cup		Other		Total	
Club	Season	Division	Apps	Goals	Apps	Goals	Apps	Goals	Apps	Goals
Patriotas	2023	Categoría Primera B	23	3	1	0	—		24	3
Patriotas	2024	Liga DIMAYOR	31	3	0	0	—		31	3
Patriotas	Total		54	6	1	0	0	0	55	6
Deportivo Pasto (loan)	2025	Liga DIMAYOR	25	4	2	1	—		27	5
Dynamo Makhachkala (loan)	2025–26	Russian Premier League	14	0	5	1	2 (Note: Appearances in relegation play-offs)	0	21	1
Dynamo Makhachkala	2026–27	Russian Premier League	15	1	3	0	—		18	1
Dynamo Makhachkala	Club total		29	1	8	1	2	0	39	2
Career total			108	11	11	2	2	0	121	13
