= Ivan Belikov (footballer, born 2004) =

Russian footballer (born 2004)

Personal information
- Full name: Ivan Aleksandrovich Belikov
- Date of birth: 25 July 2004 (age 22)
- Place of birth: Luhansk, Ukraine
- Height: 1.95 m (6 ft 5 in)
- Position: Defender

Team information
- Current team: Baltika Kaliningrad/ Baltika-2 Kaliningrad
- Number: 26

Youth career
- –2020: LVUFC Luhansk

Senior career*
Years	Team	Apps	(Gls)
2020	Dalevets Luhansk (LFS)		
2021–2023	Stroitel Kamensk-Shakhtinsky (amateur)		
2024	Stroitel Kamensk-Shakhtinsky	26	(0)
2025	Tver	12	(1)
2025–	Baltika Kaliningrad	34	(1)
2025–	Baltika-2 Kaliningrad	2	(0)
- * Club domestic league appearances and goals as of 21 November 2026

Ivan Aleksandrovich Belikov (Russian: Иван Александрович Беликов; born 25 July 2004) is a Russian and Ukrainian football player who plays as a defensive midfielder for Baltika Kaliningrad and Baltika-2 Kaliningrad.

== Career ==
Belikov was born in Ukraine and started his career in the Luhansk People's Republic amateur competitions (not recognized by FIFA) before moving to lower levels of the Russian football pyramid.

On 28 July 2025, Belikov signed a four-year contract with Russian Premier League club Baltika Kaliningrad. He made his debut in the RPL for Baltika on 3 August 2025 in a game against Orenburg.

== Career statistics ==
As of 21 November 2026

Club	Season	League			Cup		Total	
Club	Season	Division	Apps	Goals	Apps	Goals	Apps	Goals
Stroitel Kamensk-Shakhtinsky	2024	Russian Second League B	26	0	1	0	27	0
Tver	2024	Russian Second League B	12	1	0	0	12	1
Baltika Kaliningrad	2025–26	Russian Premier League	19	0	6	0	25	0
Baltika Kaliningrad	2026–27	Russian Premier League	15	1	4	0	19	1
Baltika Kaliningrad	Total		34	1	10	0	44	1
Baltika-2 Kaliningrad	2025	Russian Second League B	2	0	—		2	0
Career total			74	2	11	0	85	2
