= Ivan Bobyor =

Russian footballer (born 2006)

Personal information
- Full name: Ivan Antonovich Bobyor
- Date of birth: 7 January 2006 (age 20)
- Place of birth: Samara, Russia
- Height: 1.79 m (5 ft 10 in)
- Position: Midfielder

Team information
- Current team: Nizhny Novgorod
- Number: 7

Youth career
- –2020: Krylia Sovetov Samara
- 2020–2022: Chertanovo

Senior career*
| Years | Team | Apps | (Gls) |
| 2023–2026 | Krylia Sovetov Samara | 2 | (0) |
| 2024–2025 | → Krylia Sovetov-2 Samara | 26 | (7) |
| 2025–2026 | → Neftekhimik Nizhnekamsk (loan) | 21 | (3) |
| 2026– | Nizhny Novgorod | 0 | (0) |

International career^{‡}
| 2021 | Russia U-15 | 6 | (4) |
| 2021 | Russia U-16 | 2 | (2) |
| 2022–2023 | Russia U-17 | 4 | (1) |
| 2023 | Russia U-18 | 2 | (0) |
| 2024 | Russia U-19 | 2 | (3) |
| 2026– | Russia U-21 | 4 | (1) |
- * Club domestic league appearances and goals as of 16 May 2026 ‡ National team caps and goals as of 9 June 2026

Ivan Antonovich Bobyor (Russian: Иван Антонович Бобёр; born 7 January 2006) is a Russian football player who plays as a midfielder for Nizhny Novgorod.

== Career ==
Bobyor made his debut for Krylia Sovetov Samara on 26 July 2023 in a Russian Cup game against Baltika Kaliningrad. He made his Russian Premier League debut for Krylia Sovetov on 12 May 2025 against Pari Nizhny Novgorod.

On 11 September 2025, Bobyor was loaned to Neftekhimik Nizhnekamsk of the Russian First League.

On 23 July 2026, Bobyor moved to Nizhny Novgorod on a three-year contract.

== Personal life ==
Ivan's father is a former Russian international Anton Bobyor.

== Career statistics ==
As of match played 19 July 2025

Appearances and goals by club, season and competition
| Club | Season | League | | | Cup | | Europe | | Other | | Total | |
| Club | Season | Division | Apps | Goals | Apps | Goals | Apps | Goals | Apps | Goals | Apps | Goals |
|---|---|---|---|---|---|---|---|---|---|---|---|---|
| Krylia Sovetov Samara | 2022–23 | Russian Premier League | 0 | 0 | 0 | 0 | — | | — | | 0 | 0 |
| Krylia Sovetov Samara | 2023–24 | Russian Premier League | 0 | 0 | 3 | 0 | — | | 0 | 0 | 3 | 0 |
| Krylia Sovetov Samara | 2024–25 | Russian Premier League | 1 | 0 | 1 | 0 | — | | — | | 2 | 0 |
| Krylia Sovetov Samara | 2025–26 | Russian Premier League | 1 | 0 | 0 | 0 | — | | — | | 1 | 0 |
| Krylia Sovetov Samara | Total | | 2 | 0 | 4 | 0 | — | | 0 | 0 | 6 | 0 |
| Krylia Sovetov-2 Samara | 2024 | Russian Second League B | 16 | 3 | — | | — | | — | | 16 | 3 |
| Krylia Sovetov-2 Samara | 2025 | Russian Second League B | 7 | 3 | — | | — | | — | | 7 | 3 |
| Krylia Sovetov-2 Samara | Total | | 23 | 6 | 0 | 0 | 0 | 0 | 0 | 0 | 23 | 6 |
| Career total | | | 25 | 6 | 4 | 0 | 0 | 0 | 0 | 0 | 29 | 6 |
