= 2024–25 FC Dynamo Makhachkala season =

FC Dynamo Makhachkala
2024–25 season
- Chairman: Gadzhi Gadzhiyev
- Manager: Khasanbi Bidzhiyev
- Stadium: Anzhi Arena
- Premier League: 11th
- Russian Cup: Regions path Quarter-finals Stage 2
- Top goalscorer: League: Gamid Agalarov (7); All: Gamid Agalarov (11)
- Highest home attendance: 13,781 vs Dynamo Moscow (18 September 2024)
- Lowest home attendance: 2,258 vs Lokomotiv Moscow (28 February 2025)
- Average home league attendance: 7,035 (24 May 2025)
Home colours	Away colours

The 2024–25 season was the 97th year in the history of FC Dynamo Makhachkala, and the club's 1st season in the Russian Premier League. In addition to the domestic league, Dynamo Makhachkala participated in the Russian Cup.

== Season events ==
On 13 June, Dynamo Makhachkala announced the signing of Valentin Paltsev from KAMAZ Naberezhnye Chelny.

On 14 June, Dynamo Makhachkala announced the loan signing of Ilya Kirsh from Zenit St. Petersburg.

On 27 June, Dynamo Makhachkala announced the loan signing of Victorien Angban from Sochi.

On 16 July, Dynamo Makhachkala announced the loan signing of Nikita Kotin from Rostov.

On 24 July, Dynamo Makhachkala announced the signing of Jan Đapo from Domžale.

On 30 July, Dynamo Makhachkala announced the signing of Jemal Tabidze on a free-transfer after he'd previously played for Panetolikos. The following day, 31 July, Dynamo Makhachkala announced the signing of Houssem Eddine Mrezigue from CR Belouizdad to a long-term contract.

On 9 August, Dynamo Makhachkala announced the signing of Mohammad Javad Hosseinnejad from Sepahan.

On 20 August, Dynamo Makhachkala announced the loan signing of Nikita Goylo from Zenit St. Petersburg.

On 21 August, Dynamo Makhachkala announced the signing of Gamid Agalarov from Akhmat Grozny.

On 6 January, Anton Krachkovsky joined Azerbaijan Premier League club Turan Tovuz on loan until the end of the 2024–25 season.

On 11 January, Dynamo announced the signing of Kirill Pomeshkin from Kosmos Dolgoprudny to a long-term contract. The following day, Nikita Goylo returned to Zenit St.Petersburg after his loan was ended early.

On 16 January, Vladimir Kovačević left Dynamo to sign for Sokol Saratov.

On 13 February, Dynamo announced the signing of Mohamed Azzi from CR Belouizdad to a long-term contract.

== Squad ==
As of match played 24 May 2025

No.	Name	Nationality	Position	Date of birth (age)	Signed from	Signed in	Contract ends	Apps.	Goals
Goalkeepers
27	David Volk	(Russia)	GK	11 April 2001 (aged 24)	Baltika Kaliningrad	2023		45	0
39	Timur Magomedov	(Russia)	GK	20 December 2001 (aged 23)	Anzhi Makhachkala	2022		28	0
Defenders
4	Idar Shumakhov	(Russia)	DF	5 June 1999 (aged 25)	Spartak Nalchik	2022		101	4
5	Jemal Tabidze	(Georgia (country))	DF	18 March 1996 (aged 29)	Unattached	2024		20	0
13	Soslan Kagermazov	(Russia)	DF	20 August 1996 (aged 28)	Noah Jurmala	2021		126	6
22	Mohamed Azzi	(Algeria)	DF	11 May 2002 (aged 23)	CR Belouizdad	2025		11	2
54	Ilya Kirsh	(Russia)	DF	21 September 2004 (aged 20)	on loan from Zenit St.Petersburg	2024	2024	7	0
70	Valentin Paltsev	(Russia)	DF	12 July 2001 (aged 23)	KAMAZ Naberezhnye Chelny	2024		34	0
71	Jan Đapo	(Slovenia)	DF	17 September 2002 (aged 22)	Domžale	2024		23	2
72	Aleksandr Sandrachuk	(Russia)	DF	2 January 2002 (aged 23)	Ufa	2023		44	0
99	Mutalip Alibekov	(Russia)	DF	18 June 1997 (aged 27)	Baltika Kaliningrad	2021		110	3
Midfielders
8	Victorien Angban	(Ivory Coast)	MF	29 September 1996 (aged 28)	on loan from Sochi	2024	2024	9	0
9	Razhab Magomedov	(Russia)	MF	3 October 2000 (aged 24)	Anzhi Makhachkala	2022		68	14
10	Mohammad Javad Hosseinnejad	(Iran)	MF	26 June 2003 (aged 21)	Sepahan	2024		29	3
16	Houssem Eddine Mrezigue	(Algeria)	MF	23 March 2000 (aged 25)	CR Belouizdad	2024		26	2
19	Kirill Zinovich	(Belarus)	MF	5 March 2003 (aged 22)	Vitória de Guimarães B	2024		44	1
20	Alimkhan Zaynivov	(Russia)	MF	4 January 2005 (aged 20)	Academy	2023		15	0
21	Abdulpasha Dzhabrailov	(Russia)	MF	24 November 2004 (aged 20)	Academy	2024		12	0
47	Nikita Glushkov	(Russia)	MF	19 March 1999 (aged 26)	Chayka Peschanokopskoye	2021		124	9
53	Shamil Gadzhiyev	(Russia)	MF	26 July 2005 (aged 19)	Unattached	2023		3	1
77	Temirkan Sundukov	(Russia)	MF	17 September 2001 (aged 23)	Spartak Nalchik	2022		76	2
Forwards
7	Abakar Gadzhiyev	(Russia)	FW	31 December 2003 (aged 21)	Makhachkala	2021		114	26
11	Egas Cacintura	(Angola)	FW	29 October 1997 (aged 27)	Ufa	2023		65	9
25	Gamid Agalarov	(Russia)	FW	16 July 2000 (aged 24)	Akhmat Grozny	2024		31	11
28	Serder Serderov	(Russia)	FW	10 March 1994 (aged 31)	Sogdiana Jizzakh	2023		56	11
96	Kirill Pomeshkin	(Russia)	FW	21 March 2004 (aged 21)	Kosmos Dolgoprudny	2025		1	0
Away on loan
17	Anton Krachkovsky	(Russia)	MF	22 June 2002 (aged 22)	Kairat	2024		21	0
34	Maksim Khramtsov	(Russia)	DF	4 February 2002 (aged 23)	Baltika Kaliningrad	2023		32	0
Players that left Dynamo Makhachkala during the season
1	Nikita Goylo	(Russia)	GK	10 August 1998 (aged 26)	on loan from Zenit St.Petersburg	2024	2025	0	0
22	Zalimkhan Yusupov	(Russia)	MF	27 January 1998 (aged 27)	Makhachkala	2021		115	11
55	Vladimir Kovačević	(Serbia)	DF	11 November 1992 (aged 32)	Mladost Novi Sad	2023		47	2
82	Nikita Kotin	(Russia)	DF	1 September 2002 (aged 22)	on loan from Rostov	2024	2024	5	0
	Francisco Campo	(Colombia)	DF	23 August 2000 (aged 24)	Shakhter Karagandy	2024		0	0

== Transfers ==
=== In ===
Date	Position	Nationality	Name	From	Fee	Ref.
13 June 2024	DF	(Russia)	Valentin Paltsev	KAMAZ Naberezhnye Chelny	Undisclosed	
24 July 2024	DF	(Slovenia)	Jan Đapo	Domžale	Undisclosed	
30 July 2024	DF	(Georgia (country))	Jemal Tabidze	Unattached	Free	
31 July 2024	MF	(Algeria)	Houssem Eddine Mrezigue	CR Belouizdad	Undisclosed	
9 August 2024	MF	(Iran)	Mohammad Javad Hosseinnejad	Sepahan	Undisclosed	
21 August 2024	FW	(Russia)	Gamid Agalarov	Akhmat Grozny	Undisclosed	
11 January 2025	FW	(Russia)	Kirill Pomeshkin	Kosmos Dolgoprudny	Undisclosed	
13 February 2025	DF	(Algeria)	Mohamed Azzi	CR Belouizdad	Undisclosed	

=== Loans in ===
Date from	Position	Nationality	Name	From	Date to	Ref.
14 June 2024	DF	(Russia)	Ilya Kirsh	Zenit St. Petersburg	End of season	
27 June 2024	MF	(Ivory Coast)	Victorien Angban	Sochi	End of season	
16 July 2024	DF	(Russia)	Nikita Kotin	Rostov	12 February 2025	
20 August 2024	GK	(Russia)	Nikita Goylo	Zenit St. Petersburg	12 January 2025	

=== Out ===
Date	Position	Nationality	Name	To	Fee	Ref.
20 June 2024	FW	(Russia)	Ramazan Abduragimov	Mashuk-KMV Pyatigorsk	Undisclosed	
3 July 2024	DF	(Russia)	Kamil Ibragimov	Chayka Peschanokopskoye	Undisclosed	
16 January 2025	DF	(Serbia)	Vladimir Kovačević	Sokol Saratov	Undisclosed	
16 February 2025	MF	(Russia)	Zalimkhan Yusupov	Chernomorets Novorossiysk	Undisclosed	

=== Loans out ===
Date from	Position	Nationality	Name	To	Date to	Ref.
12 August 2024	DF	(Colombia)	Francisco Campo	Shakhter Karagandy	31 December 2024	
22 August 2024	DF	(Russia)	Maksim Khramtsov	Tyumen	30 June 2025	
6 January 2025	MF	(Russia)	Anton Krachkovsky	Turan Tovuz	30 June 2025	

=== Released ===
Date	Position	Nationality	Name	Joined	Date	Ref.
20 June 2024	DF	(Russia)	Yevgeni Goshev	Tyumen	18 July 2024	
15 February 2025	DF	(Colombia)	Francisco Campo	Minsk	29 March 2025	

== Friendlies ==
9 September 2024	Akhmat Grozny	2 – 2	Dynamo Makhachkala	Grozny
17:00 MSK (UTC+3)	Diale 39'; Divanović 72' (pen.)	Report	A.Gadzhiyev 3'; Serderov 66'	Stadium: Akhmat-Arena

23 March 2025	Akhmat Grozny	1–2	Dynamo Makhachkala	Grozny
MSK (UTC+3)	Ruiz Díaz 59'	Report	Agalarov 44'; Serderov 79'	Stadium: Akhmat-Arena

== Competitions ==
=== Overall record ===
Competition	First match	Last match	Starting round	Final position	Record							
Competition	First match	Last match	Starting round	Final position	Pld	W	D	L	GF	GA	GD	Win %
Premier League	21 July 2024	24 May 2025	Matchday 1	11th	30	6	11	13	27	35	−8	20.00
Russian Cup	1 August 2024	11 March 2025	Group stage	Regions path Quarter-finals Stage 2	8	2	3	3	10	11	−1	25.00
Total					38	8	14	16	37	46	−9	21.05

Last updated: 24 May 2025
Source: Soccerway

=== Premier League ===
==== League table ====
Pos	Team	Pld	W	D	L	GF	GA	GD	Pts	Qualification or relegation
9	Akron Tolyatti	30	10	5	15	39	55	−16	35	
10	Krylia Sovetov Samara	30	8	7	15	36	51	−15	31	
11	Dynamo Makhachkala	30	6	11	13	27	35	−8	29 (Note: Dynamo Makhachkala 4–1 Khimki, Khimki 1–1 Dynamo Makhachkala)	
12	Khimki (D, R)	30	6	11	13	35	56	−21	29	Administratively relegated, then dissolved. (Note: Khimki were not issued the 2025–26 RPL license and were administratively relegated. They were replaced by Pari Nizhny Novgorod. Khimki were then dissolved.)
13	Pari Nizhny Novgorod (X)	30	7	6	17	27	54	−27	27	Qualification to relegation play-offs

Source: Premier Liga
Rules for classification: 1) Points; 2) Head-to-head points; 3) Head-to-head matches won; 4) Head-to-head goal difference; 5) Head-to-head goals scored; 6) Matches won; 7) Goal difference; 8) Goals scored; 9) 2023–24 position (not applicable to final standings); 10) Play-off. Note: if teams tied on points did not play an equal number of head-to-head games, head-to-head results are not considered for the standings.
(D) Disqualified; (R) Relegated; (X) Lost in the play-offs, reprieved from relegation after Khimki was administratively relegated.

==== Results summary ====
Overall								Home						Away					
Pld	W	D	L	GF	GA	GD	Pts	W	D	L	GF	GA	GD	W	D	L	GF	GA	GD
30	6	11	13	27	35	−8	29	4	5	6	19	16	+3	2	6	7	8	19	−11

Last updated: 24 May 2025.

==== Results by round ====
Round	1	2	3	4	5	6	7	8	9	10	11	12	13	14	15	16	17	18	19	20	21	22	23	24	25	26	27	28	29	30
Ground	A	A	H	A	H	A	A	H	A	H	A	H	H	A	H	A	H	H	H	A	H	A	H	A	A	H	A	H	A	H
Result	D	D	L	L	W	L	W	D	D	L	D	L	D	L	W	D	D	L	D	L	W	L	W	W	L	L	L	L	D	D
Position	9	12	13	15	11	13	9	9	9	12	11	10	11	11	11	11	11	11	13	13	10	12	10	10	10	11	11	11	12	11

Updated to match(es) played on 24 May 2025. Source:
A = Away; H = Home; W = Win; D = Draw; L = Loss
Notes:
- ^{1}

==== Matches ====
The match schedule was released on 20 June 2024.

21 July 2024 1	Khimki	1–1	Dynamo Makhachkala	Khimki
20:00 MSK (UTC+3)	Rudenko (penalty missed) 23'; Khosonov (penalty missed) 39'; Anđelković (yellow card) 45+'; Zabolotny 52'	Report	Shumakhov 33'	Stadium: Arena Khimki; Attendance: 1,923; Referee: Egor Egorov

28 July 2024 2	Krasnodar	0–0	Dynamo Makhachkala	Krasnodar
20:00 MSK (UTC+3)	Costa (yellow card) 50'; Sá (yellow card) 72'	Report	Sundukov (yellow card) 66'; Angban (yellow card) 83'; Volk (yellow card) 90+'	Stadium: Krasnodar Stadium; Attendance: 17,385; Referee: Pavel Shadykhanov

4 August 2024 3	Dynamo Makhachkala	0–1	Pari NN	Kaspiysk
20:30 MSK (UTC+3)	Alibekov (yellow card) 36' (yellow-red card) 60'; Cacintura (yellow card) 42'; Krachkovsky (yellow card) 53'; Paltsev (yellow card) 90+10'; Glushkov (red card) 90+10'	Report	Ožegović (yellow card) 36'; Zé Turbo (yellow card) 55'; Kalinsky 82' (pen.); Tikhy (yellow card) 90+6'; Stamatov (yellow card) 90+10'	Stadium: Anzhi Arena; Attendance: 6,984; Referee: Yan Bobrovsky

10 August 2024 4	Lokomotiv Moscow	2–0	Dynamo Makhachkala	Moscow
15:00 MSK (UTC+3)	Samoshnikov 11'; Morozov 64' (yellow card) 89'	Report	Sundukov (yellow card) 53'	Stadium: RZD Arena; Attendance: 8,587; Referee: Evgeny Kukulyak

19 August 2024 5	Dynamo Makhachkala	1–0	Akhmat Grozny	Kaspiysk
20:00 MSK (UTC+3)	Hosseinnejad (yellow card) 75' (goal) 87'; Zinovich (yellow card) 90+'	Report	Felippe (yellow card) 38'; Shvets (yellow card) 85'	Stadium: Anzhi Arena; Attendance: 8,967; Referee: Pavel Shadykhanov

23 August 2024 6	Rubin Kazan	2–0	Dynamo Makhachkala	Kazan
20:00 MSK (UTC+3)	Daku 45'; Čumić 63'; Teslenko (yellow card) 79'; Staver (yellow card) 87'; Ivanov (yellow card) 90+3'	Report	Yusupov (yellow card) 45+1'; Alibekov (red card) 68'; Zinovich (yellow card) 90+2'; Gadzhiyev (yellow card) 90+3'	Stadium: Ak Bars Arena; Attendance: 7,555; Referee: Kirill Levnikov

1 September 2024 7	Krylia Sovetov	0–1	Dynamo Makhachkala	Samara
17:30 MSK (UTC+3)	Soldatenkov (yellow card) 72'; Dmitriyev (yellow card) 90+4'	Report	Paltsev (yellow card) 37'; Gadzhiyev 44'; Glushkov (yellow card) 47'; Sandrachuk (yellow card) 82'	Stadium: Solidarnost Samara Arena; Attendance: 9,257; Referee: Sergey Cheban

15 September 2024 8	Dynamo Makhachkala	1–1	Spartak Moscow	Kaspiysk
19:00 MSK (UTC+3)	Litvinov 36' (o.g.); Sundukov (yellow card) 50'; Mrezigue (red card) 90+'; Kagermazov (yellow card) 90+3'	Report	Ugalde 20'; Bongonda (yellow card) 69'; Babić (yellow card) 75'	Stadium: Anzhi Arena; Attendance: 11,839; Referee: Pavel Kukuyan

22 September 2024 9	Rostov	0–0	Dynamo Makhachkala	Rostov
16:30 MSK (UTC+3)		Report	Yusupov (yellow card) 1'; Gadzhiyev (yellow card) 67'; Tabidze (yellow card) 71'	Stadium: Rostov Arena; Attendance: 13,025; Referee: Sergei Karasev

29 September 2024 10	Dynamo Makhachkala	0–1	Dynamo Moscow	Kaspiysk
19:00 MSK (UTC+3)	Cacintura (yellow card) 35'; Tabidze (yellow card) 73'	Report	Ngamaleu 20'; Gomes (yellow card) 26'; Fomin (yellow card) 30'	Stadium: Anzhi Arena; Attendance: 10,297; Referee: Sergey Cheban

6 October 2024 11	Fakel Voronezh	1–1	Dynamo Makhachkala	Voronezh
14:00 MSK (UTC+3)	Ilyin (yellow card) 25'; Markov (yellow card) 49'; Alshin 51' (yellow card) 73'; Dziov (yellow card) 54'; Kalinin (yellow card) 61'; Brahimi (yellow card) 65'	Report	Agalarov 19' (yellow card) 45+'; Sundukov (yellow card) 41'; Paltsev (yellow card) 51'; Gadzhiyev (yellow card) 55'; Glushkov (yellow card) 90+'	Stadium: Fakel Stadium; Attendance: 8,501; Referee: Vasily Kazartsev

19 October 2024 12	Dynamo Makhachkala	0–1	CSKA Moscow	Kaspiysk
19:00 MSK (UTC+3)	Cacintura (yellow card) 75'	Report	Musayev 56'; Willyan (yellow card) 90+'	Stadium: Anzhi Arena; Attendance: 10,215; Referee: Sergey Ivanov

26 October 2024 13	Dynamo Makhachkala	1–1	Akron Tolyatti	Kaspiysk
14:00 MSK (UTC+3)	Agalarov (yellow card) 40' (goal) 68'; Yusupov (yellow card) 90+1'; Kagermazov (yellow card) 90+4'	Report	Danilin (yellow card) 9'; Lončar (yellow card) 41'; Bakayev (yellow card) 90+2'; Khubulov 90+3'	Stadium: Anzhi Arena; Attendance: 4,554; Referee: Artem Chistyakov

2 November 2024 14	Zenit St.Petersburg	2–1	Dynamo Makhachkala	Saint Petersburg
18:00 MSK (UTC+3)	Nino 12'; Gondou 15' (yellow card) 36'; Mantuan (yellow card) 90+'	Report	Kirsh (yellow card) 4'; Glushkov (yellow card) 45+'; Kagermazov 61'	Stadium: Krestovsky Stadium; Attendance: 20,952; Referee: Vitali Meshkov

9 November 2024 15	Dynamo Makhachkala	2–1	Orenburg	Kaspiysk
16:30 MSK (UTC+3)	Magomedov (yellow card) 8'; Paltsev (yellow card) 63'; Cacintura 78'; Agalarov 90+'	Report	Mansilla (yellow card) 11'; Saharkhizan 13' (yellow card) 76'; Mikhaylov (yellow card) 24'; Prokhin (yellow card) 80' (red card) FT; Sysuyev (yellow card) 88'; Kovalenko (yellow card) 90'	Stadium: Anzhi Arena; Attendance: 4,689; Referee: Kirill Levnikov

24 November 2024 16	Pari NN	0–0	Dynamo Makhachkala	Nizhny Novgorod
19:00 MSK (UTC+3)	Mukhin (yellow card) 38'; Bozhenov (yellow card) 59'	Report	Alibekov (yellow card) 90+'	Stadium: Nizhny Novgorod Stadium; Attendance: 5,742; Referee: Vasily Kazartsev

1 December 2024 17	Dynamo Makhachkala	0–0	Fakel Voronezh	Kaspiysk
19:00 MSK (UTC+3)	Kagermazov (yellow card) 86'; Mrezigue (yellow card) 89'	Report	Kashtanov (yellow card) 66'	Stadium: Anzhi Arena; Attendance: 4,877; Referee: Sergei Karasev

7 December 2024 18	Dynamo Makhachkala	2–3	Rubin Kazan	Kaspiysk
19:00 MSK (UTC+3)	Đapo 17' (yellow card) 62'; Mrezigue 39'; Serderov (yellow card) 45+'	Report	Jočić 43'; Teslenko 56'; Shabanhaxhaj 69'; Vujačić (yellow card) 75'; Bezrukov (yellow card) 86'; Çuni (yellow card) 90+'; Staver (yellow card) 90+'	Stadium: Anzhi Arena; Attendance: 4,130; Referee: Aleksey Sukhoi

28 February 2025 19	Dynamo Makhachkala	1–1	Lokomotiv Moscow	Kaspiysk
19:00 MSK (UTC+3)	Cacintura 9' (yellow card) 69'; Glushkov (yellow card) 81'; Serderov (yellow card) 83'	Report	Vorobyov 85'	Stadium: Anzhi Arena; Attendance: 2,258; Referee: Aleksey Sukhoi

8 March 2025 20	Dynamo Moscow	4–0	Dynamo Makhachkala	Moscow
19:30 MSK (UTC+3)	Maouhoub 7'; Gladyshev 46'; Fomin 65'; Balbuena 84'	Report	Đapo (yellow card) 45+'; Azzi (yellow card) 87'	Stadium: VTB Arena; Attendance: 9,130; Referee: Pavel Shadykhanov

15 March 2025 21	Dynamo Makhachkala	4–0	Krylia Sovetov	Kaspiysk
17:00 MSK (UTC+3)	Agalarov 29', 75' (pen.); Azzi 38'; Shumakhov (yellow card) HT; Glushkov (yellow card) HT; Gadzhiyev 89'	Report	Gaponov (yellow card) 25' (red card) 53'; Rahmanović (yellow card) HT; Bijl (yellow card) HT	Stadium: Anzhi Arena; Attendance: 3,561; Referee: Artem Chistyakov

29 March 2025 22	CSKA Moscow	2–0	Dynamo Makhachkala	Moscow
19:30 MSK (UTC+3)	Moisés 32' (yellow card) 32'; Oblyakov (yellow card) 43'; Guarirapa (yellow card) 58'; Zhemaletdinov 80'	Report	Cacintura (yellow card) 69'; Gadzhiyev (yellow card) 81'	Stadium: VEB Arena; Attendance: 9,406; Referee: Aleksey Sukhoi

6 April 2025 23	Dynamo Makhachkala	4–1	Khimki	Kaspiysk
14:00 MSK (UTC+3)	Cacintura 26'; Hosseinnejad 30'; Agalarov 45' (pen.), 77'; Shumakhov (yellow card) 49'; Sundukov (yellow card) 62'	Report	Zabolotny 57'	Stadium: Anzhi Arena; Attendance: 5,664; Referee: Sergey Cheban

11 April 2025 24	Spartak Moscow	1–2	Dynamo Makhachkala	Moscow
19:30 MSK (UTC+3)	Denisov (yellow card) 45+'; Bongonda 68'; Solari (yellow card) 81'; Medina (penalty missed) 87'	Report	Glushkov (yellow card) 2'; Kagermazov (yellow card) 3'; Denisov 10' (o.g.); Mrezigue 16'	Stadium: Lukoil Arena; Attendance: 18,731; Referee: Vitali Meshkov

19 April 2025 25	Orenburg	2–1	Dynamo Makhachkala	Orenburg
12:00 MSK (UTC+3)	Mansilla (yellow card) 11'; Gürlük 60'; Malykh (yellow card) 32'; Revazov 81'; Marín (yellow card) 86'	Report	Sundukov 28' (yellow card) 86'; Tabidze (yellow card) 31'; Hosseinnejad (yellow card) 32'; Glushkov (yellow card) 47'; Gadzhiyev (yellow card) 90+'; Alibekov (yellow card) 90+' (red card) 90+'	Stadium: Gazovik Stadium; Attendance: 3,321; Referee: Ranel Ziyakov

25 April 2025 26	Dynamo Makhachkala	2–3	Krasnodar	Kaspiysk
19:30 MSK (UTC+3)	Hosseinnejad 25'; Glushkov (yellow card) 62'; Zinovich 86'; Tabidze (yellow card) 88'; Agalarov (penalty missed) 90+'	Report	Cobnan 6'; Petrov (yellow card) 13'; Costa (yellow card) 34' (yellow-red card) 79'; Córdoba (yellow card) 39'; Batxi 45'; Spertsyan 65' (penalty missed) 79'; Agkatsev (yellow card) 79'	Stadium: Anzhi Arena; Attendance: 9,548; Referee: Artem Chistyakov

2 May 2025 27	Akron Tolyatti	1–0	Dynamo Makhachkala	Samara
18:00 MSK (UTC+3)	Dzyuba 74'; Savichev (yellow card) 79'; Benchimol (yellow card) 85'	Report	Sundukov (yellow card) 72'; Alibekov (yellow card) 84'	Stadium: Solidarnost Samara Arena; Attendance: 2,942; Referee: Vitali Meshkov

10 May 2025 28	Dynamo Makhachkala	0–1	Zenit St.Petersburg	Kaspiysk
17:00 MSK (UTC+3)		Report	Nino 37'; Sobolev (yellow card) 81'; Latyshonok (yellow card) 90+'	Stadium: Anzhi Arena; Attendance: 10,882; Referee: Artem Chistyakov

18 May 2025 29	Akhmat Grozny	1–1	Dynamo Makhachkala	Grozny
14:00 MSK (UTC+3)	Ismael (yellow card) 14'; Samorodov 48'	Report	Mrezigue (yellow card) 30'; Serderov 36' (pen.); Tabidze (yellow card) 45+'; Shumakhov (yellow card) 55'; Hosseinnejad (yellow card) 72'	Stadium: Akhmat-Arena; Attendance: 5,276; Referee: Yan Bobrovsky

24 May 2025 30	Dynamo Makhachkala	1–1	Rostov	Kaspiysk
16:30 MSK (UTC+3)	Glushkov (yellow card) 41'; Cacintura 45' (red card) 62'	Report	Sako (yellow card) 35' (yellow-red card) 86'; Komarov 73'	Stadium: Anzhi Arena; Attendance: 7,063; Referee: Pavel Kukuyan

=== Russian Cup ===
==== Group stage ====
Pos	Team	Pld	W	PW	PL	L	GF	GA	GD	Pts	Qualification
1	Spartak Moscow	6	5	0	0	1	14	4	+10	15	Qualification to the Knockout phase (RPL path)
2	Dynamo Moscow	6	3	1	0	2	17	13	+4	11	Qualification to the Knockout phase (RPL path)
3	Dynamo Makhachkala	6	2	0	2	2	8	8	0	8	Qualification to the Knockout phase (regions path)
4	Krylia Sovetov Samara	6	0	1	0	5	8	22	−14	2	

Source: Russian Football Union (in Russian), Soccerway
Rules for classification: 1) Points; 2) Head-to-head points; 3) Head-to-head matches won; 4) Head-to-head goal difference; 5) Head-to-head goals scored; 6) Matches won; 7) Goal difference; 8) Goals scored; 9) Penalty shoot-out goal difference; 10) Draw.

1 August 2024 1	Dynamo Makhachkala	1–0	Krylia Sovetov	Kaspiysk
19:30 MSK (UTC+3)	Gadzhiyev 83' (yellow card) 90+5'	Report	Vladimir Pisarsky (Sychevoy) (yellow card) 40'	Stadium: Anzhi Arena; Attendance: 10,027; Referee: Sergey Tsyganok

14 August 2024 2	Dynamo Moscow	2–1	Dynamo Makhachkala	Moscow
19:30 MSK (UTC+3)	Makarov (yellow card) 42'; Carrascal 54' (pen.) (yellow card) 62'; Gladyshev 75'	Report	Gadzhiyev 44'	Stadium: VTB Arena; Attendance: 12,105; Referee: Yegor Yegorov

27 August 2024 3	Spartak Moscow	0–1	Dynamo Makhachkala	Moscow
19:30 MSK (UTC+3)	Zobnin (yellow card) 16'; Ugalde (yellow card) 90'; Abena (yellow card) 90+4'	Report	Agalarov 14'; Mrezigue (yellow card) 30'; Gadzhiyev (yellow card) 44'; Sundukov (yellow card) 61'; Paltsev (yellow card) 90'; Volk (yellow card) 90+2'	Stadium: Lukoil Arena; Attendance: 19,419; Referee: Alexander Mashlyakevich

18 September 2024 4	Dynamo Makhachkala	2–2 (3–5 p)	Dynamo Moscow	Kaspiysk
21:15 MSK (UTC+3)	Serderov 40'; Agalarov 67'	Report	Fomin 34'; Gomes 37'; Skopintsev (yellow card) 61'; Fernández (yellow card) 77'; Aleksandrov (yellow card) 90'	Stadium: Anzhi Arena; Attendance: 13,781; Referee: Ivan Abrosimov
	Penalties
	Agalarov (penalty scored); R.Magomedov (penalty scored); Glushkov (penalty missed); Yusupov (penalty scored)		(penalty scored) Fomin; (penalty scored) Gladyshev; (penalty scored) Maouhoub; (penalty scored) Carrascal; (penalty scored) Bitello

2 October 2024 5	Krylia Sovetov	3–3 (5–3 p)	Dynamo Makhachkala	Samara
19:00 MSK (UTC+3)	Babayev 1', 30'; Tsypchenko 11'	Report	Paltsev (yellow card) 49'; Agalarov 57', 66'; Gadzhiyev (yellow card) 85' (goal) 90+2'	Stadium: Solidarnost Samara Arena; Attendance: 5,092; Referee: Mikhail Cheremnykh
	Penalties
	Sergeyev (penalty scored); Garré (penalty scored); Oleynikov (penalty scored); Méndez (penalty scored); Dmitriyev (penalty scored)		(penalty scored) Agalarov; (penalty missed) Gadzhiyev; (penalty scored) Yusupov; (penalty scored) Paltsev

22 October 2024 6	Dynamo Makhachkala	0–1	Spartak Moscow	Kaspiysk
18:30 MSK (UTC+3)	Kirsh (red card) 37'; Kagermazov (yellow card) 89'	Report	Zorin 48' (yellow card) 53' (yellow-red card) 85'; Mangas (yellow card) 75'	Stadium: Anzhi Arena; Attendance: 10,032; Referee: Pavel Shadykhanov

==== Knockout phase ====
27 November 2024 Regions path Quarter-finals Stage 1	Sochi	1–1 (3–4 p)	Dynamo Makhachkala	Sochi
18:15 MSK (UTC+3)	Shushenachev 45'; Suslov (red card) 87'	Report	Đapo 70'	Stadium: Fisht Olympic Stadium; Attendance: 2,456; Referee: Ivan Abrosimov
	Penalties
	Kramarič (penalty scored); Kravtsov (penalty missed); Saavedra (penalty scored); Nikitin (penalty missed); Pisarsky (penalty scored)		(penalty scored) Agalarov; (penalty scored) Magomedov; (penalty missed) Mrezigue; (penalty scored) Paltsev; (penalty scored) Cacintura

11 March 2025 Regions path Quarter-finals Stage 2	Dynamo Makhachkala	1–2	Lokomotiv Moscow	Kaspiysk
18:00 MSK (UTC+3)	Glushkov (yellow card) 20'; Azzi 22'; Paltsev (yellow card) 45'; Kagermazov (red card) 46'; Agalarov (yellow card) 90+3'; Shumakhov (yellow card) 90+5'	Report	Nenakhov 13'; Timofeyev (yellow card) 45'; Pinyayev 54'; Godyayev (yellow card) 63'; Sarveli (yellow card) 90+5'; Suleymanov (yellow card) 90+5'	Stadium: Anzhi Arena; Attendance: 4,923; Referee: Vasily Kazartsev

== Squad statistics ==
As of match played 24 May 2025

=== Appearances and goals ===
No.	Pos	Nat	Player	Total		Premier League		Russian Cup	
No.	Pos	Nat	Player	Apps	Goals	Apps	Goals	Apps	Goals
4	DF	(Russia) RUS	Idar Shumakhov	34	1	28+1	1	5	0
5	DF	(Georgia (country)) GEO	Jemal Tabidze	20	0	18+1	0	1	0
7	FW	(Russia) RUS	Abakar Gadzhiyev	35	4	9+19	1	5+2	3
8	MF	(Ivory Coast) CIV	Victorien Angban	9	0	2+3	0	3+1	0
9	MF	(Russia) RUS	Razhab Magomedov	33	0	11+14	0	4+4	0
10	MF	(Iran) IRI	Mohammad Javad Hosseinnejad	29	3	12+12	3	4+1	0
11	FW	(Angola) ANG	Egas Cacintura	32	4	24+2	4	3+3	0
13	DF	(Russia) RUS	Soslan Kagermazov	30	1	19+5	1	2+4	0
16	MF	(Algeria) ALG	Houssem Eddine Mrezigue	25	2	19+2	2	1+3	0
19	MF	(Belarus) BLR	Kirill Zinovich	33	1	4+22	1	4+3	0
21	MF	(Russia) RUS	Abdulpasha Dzhabrailov	11	0	1+9	0	1	0
22	DF	(Algeria) ALG	Mohamed Azzi	12	2	10+1	1	1	1
25	FW	(Russia) RUS	Gamid Agalarov	31	11	23+2	7	1+5	4
27	GK	(Russia) RUS	David Volk	23	0	20	0	3	0
28	FW	(Russia) RUS	Serder Serderov	26	2	8+13	1	4+1	1
39	GK	(Russia) RUS	Timur Magomedov	15	0	10	0	5	0
47	MF	(Russia) RUS	Nikita Glushkov	33	0	27	0	4+2	0
53	MF	(Russia) RUS	Shamil Gadzhiyev	2	0	0+2	0	0	0
54	DF	(Russia) RUS	Ilya Kirsh	7	0	2+1	0	3+1	0
70	DF	(Russia) RUS	Valentin Paltsev	33	0	27	0	5+1	0
71	DF	(Slovenia) SLO	Jan Đapo	23	2	9+7	1	6+1	1
72	DF	(Russia) RUS	Aleksandr Sandrachuk	14	0	4+6	0	3+1	0
77	DF	(Russia) RUS	Temirkan Sundukov	35	1	23+4	1	5+3	0
96	FW	(Russia) RUS	Kirill Pomeshkin	1	0	0+1	0	0	0
99	DF	(Russia) RUS	Mutalip Alibekov	19	0	12+3	0	4	0
Players away from the club on loan:
17	MF	(Russia) RUS	Anton Krachkovsky	7	0	4	0	1+2	0
21	MF	(Russia) RUS	Abdulpasha Dzhabrailov	1	0	0	0	0+1	0
34	DF	(Russia) RUS	Maksim Khramtsov	2	0	0+2	0	0	0
Players who appeared for Dynamo Makhachkala but left during the season:
22	MF	(Russia) RUS	Zalimkhan Yusupov	18	0	4+8	0	4+2	0
55	DF	(Serbia) SRB	Vladimir Kovačević	3	0	0+1	0	2	0
82	DF	(Russia) RUS	Nikita Kotin	5	0	0+1	0	4	0

=== Goal scorers ===
Place	Position	Nation	Number	Name	Premier League	Russian Cup	Total
1	FW	(Russia)	25	Gamid Agalarov	7	4	11
2	FW	(Angola)	11	Egas Cacintura	4	0	4
2	FW	(Russia)	7	Abakar Gadzhiyev	1	3	4
4	MF	(Iran)	10	Mohammad Javad Hosseinnejad	3	0	3
5	MF	(Algeria)	16	Houssem Eddine Mrezigue	2	0	2
5	DF	(Slovenia)	71	Jan Đapo	1	1	2
5	DF	(Algeria)	22	Mohamed Azzi	1	1	2
5	FW	(Russia)	28	Serder Serderov	1	1	2
5				Own goal	2	0	2
10	DF	(Russia)	4	Idar Shumakhov	1	0	1
10	MF	(Russia)	13	Soslan Kagermazov	1	0	1
10	MF	(Russia)	53	Shamil Gadzhiyev	1	0	1
10	MF	(Russia)	77	Temirkan Sundukov	1	0	1
10	MF	(Belarus)	19	Kirill Zinovich	1	0	1
Total					27	10	37

=== Clean sheets ===
Place	Position	Nation	Number	Name	Premier League	Russian Cup	Total
1	GK	(Russia)	27	David Volk	6	2	8
2	GK	(Russia)	39	Timur Magomedov	1	0	1
Total					7	2	9

=== Disciplinary record ===
Number	Nation	Position	Name	Premier League		Russian Cup		Total	
Number	Nation	Position	Name	Yellow card	Red card	Yellow card	Red card	Yellow card	Red card
4	(Russia)	DF	Idar Shumakhov	3	0	1	0	4	0
5	(Georgia (country))	DF	Jemal Tabidze	5	0	0	0	5	0
7	(Russia)	FW	Abakar Gadzhiyev	5	0	3	0	8	0
8	(Ivory Coast)	MF	Victorien Angban	1	0	0	0	1	0
9	(Russia)	MF	Razhab Magomedov	1	0	0	0	1	0
10	(Iran)	MF	Mohammad Javad Hosseinnejad	3	0	0	0	3	0
11	(Angola)	MF	Egas Cacintura	5	1	0	0	5	1
13	(Russia)	DF	Soslan Kagermazov	4	0	1	1	5	1
16	(Algeria)	MF	Houssem Eddine Mrezigue	3	1	0	0	3	1
19	(Russia)	MF	Kirill Zinovich	2	0	0	0	2	0
22	(Algeria)	DF	Mohamed Azzi	1	0	0	0	1	0
25	(Russia)	FW	Gamid Agalarov	2	0	1	0	3	0
27	(Russia)	GK	David Volk	1	0	1	0	2	0
28	(Russia)	FW	Serder Serderov	2	0	0	0	2	0
47	(Russia)	MF	Nikita Glushkov	9	1	1	0	10	1
54	(Russia)	DF	Ilya Kirsh	1	0	0	1	1	1
70	(Russia)	DF	Valentin Paltsev	4	0	3	0	8	0
71	(Slovenia)	DF	Jan Đapo	2	0	0	0	2	0
72	(Russia)	DF	Aleksandr Sandrachuk	1	0	0	0	1	0
77	(Russia)	DF	Temirkan Sundukov	7	0	1	0	8	0
99	(Russia)	DF	Mutalip Alibekov	5	3	0	0	5	3
Players away on loan:
17	(Russia)	MF	Anton Krachkovsky	1	0	0	0	1	0
Players who left Dynamo Makhachkala during the season:
22	(Russia)	MF	Zalimkhan Yusupov	3	0	0	0	3	0
Total				70	6	13	2	83	8
