= Glushkov =

Glushkov, Gloushkov, and Glouchkov; feminine: Glushkova (Russian: Глушков; feminine: Russian: Глушкова) is a Russian surname. Notable people with the name include:

- Aleksei Glushkov (Russian: Алексей Юрьевич Глушков; born 1975), Russian Olympic bronze medalist wrestler
- Anastasia Gloushkov (born 1985), Israeli Olympic synchronized swimmer
- Irina Glushkova (Russian: Ирина Петровна Глушкова; born 1952), Soviet and Russian indologist and philologist
- Georgi Glouchkov (Bulgarian: Георги Николов Глушков; born 1960), Bulgarian basketball player
- Nikita Glushkov:
  - Nikita Glushkov (Russian: Никита Андреевич Глушков; born 1994), Russian football player
  - Nikita Glushkov (Russian: Никита Вячеславович Глушков; born 1992), Russian football player
  - Nikita Glushkov (Russian: Никита Сергеевич Глушков; born 1999), Russian football player
- Nikolai Glushkov (Russian: Николай Алексеевич Глушков; 1949–2018), Russian businessman, Deputy Director-General of Aeroflot
- Victor Glushkov (Russian: Ви́ктор Миха́йлович Глушко́в, IPA: ['vʲiktər mʲi'xajləvʲɪt͡ɕ ɡlʊʂ'kof]; Ukrainian: Ві́ктор Миха́йлович Глушко́в; 1923–1982), Soviet founding father of information technology and a founder of cybernetics
- Yekaterina Glushkova (born 1981), Kazakhstani water polo player

== See also ==
- Glushko
