= Kirill Pomeshkin =

Russian footballer

Personal information
- Full name: Kirill Konstantinovich Pomeshkin
- Date of birth: 21 March 2004 (age 22)
- Place of birth: Berdsk, Novosibirsk Oblast, Russia
- Height: 1.82 m (5 ft 11 1/2 in)
- Position: Midfielder

Team information
- Current team: Mashuk-KMV Pyatigorsk (on loan from Dynamo Makhachkala)
- Number: 96

Youth career
- –2015: Sibir Novosibirsk
- 2015–2018: DYuSSh Berdsk
- 2018–2021: SShOR No.63 Smena Moscow
- 2021–2022: Chertanovo Moscow
- 2022: Kosmos Dolgoprudny

Senior career*
Years	Team	Apps	(Gls)
2023–2024	Kosmos Dolgoprudny	49	(16)
2025–	Dynamo Makhachkala	3	(0)
2025–	→ Dynamo-2 Makhachkala	5	(1)
2025–2026	→ Chernomorets Novorossiysk (loan)	12	(0)
2026–	→ Mashuk-KMV Pyatigorsk (loan)	11	(1)
- * Club domestic league appearances and goals as of 15 November 2026

Kirill Konstantinovich Pomeshkin (Russian: Кирилл Константинович Помешкин; born 21 March 2004) is a Russian footballer who plays as a midfielder for Mashuk-KMV Pyatigorsk on loan from Dynamo Makhachkala.

== Club career ==
Pomeshkin made his debut in the Russian Second League for Kosmos Dolgoprudny on 8 April 2023 in a game against Rodina-2 Moscow.

He made his Russian Premier League debut for Dynamo Makhachkala on 2 May 2025 in a game against Akron Tolyatti.

On 5 September 2025, Pomeshkin was loaned by Chernomorets Novorossiysk. On 18 July 2026, he moved on a new loan to Mashuk-KMV Pyatigorsk.

== Career statistics ==
As of 27 August 2025

Club	Season	League			Cup		Continental		Other		Total	
Club	Season	Division	Apps	Goals	Apps	Goals	Apps	Goals	Apps	Goals	Apps	Goals
Kosmos Dolgoprudny	2022–23	Russian Second League	6	0	–		–		–		6	0
Kosmos Dolgoprudny	2023	Russian Second League B	16	4	1	0	–		–		17	4
Kosmos Dolgoprudny	2024	Russian Second League B	27	12	2	1	–		–		29	13
Kosmos Dolgoprudny	Total		49	16	3	1	0	0	0	0	52	17
Dynamo-2 Makhachkala	2025	Russian Second League B	5	1	–		–		–		5	1
Dynamo Makhachkala	2024–25	Russian Premier League	1	0	0	0	–		–		1	0
Dynamo Makhachkala	2025–26	Russian Premier League	2	0	2	0	–		–		4	0
Dynamo Makhachkala	Total		3	0	2	0	0	0	0	0	5	0
Career total			57	17	5	1	0	0	0	0	62	18
