= Abakar Gadzhiyev =

Russian footballer

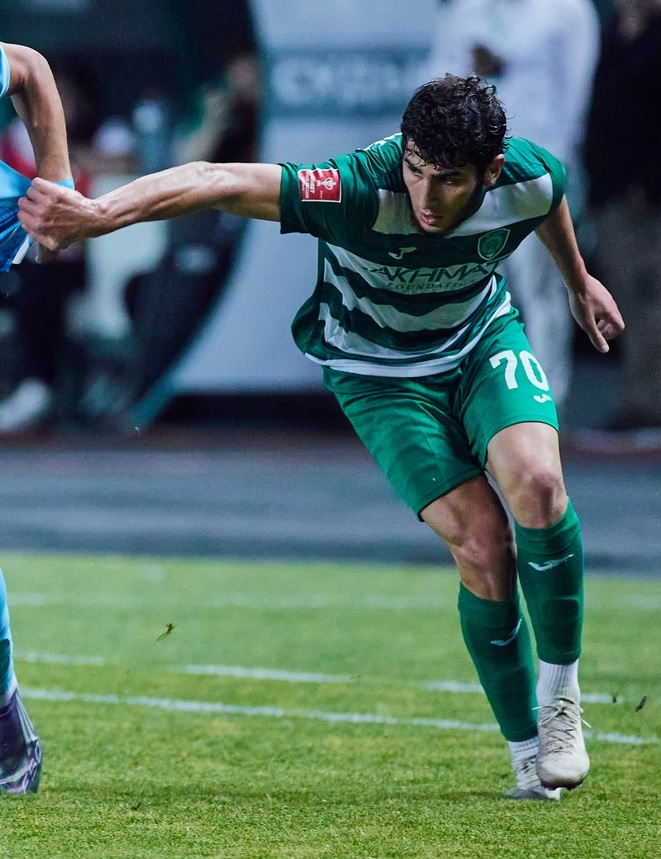
- Gadzhiyev with Akhmat in 2025

Personal information
- Full name: Abakar Gadzhiyavovich Gadzhiyev
- Date of birth: 31 December 2003 (age 22)
- Place of birth: Makhachkala, Russia
- Height: 1.80 m (5 ft 11 in)
- Positions: Left winger; attacking midfielder

Team information
- Current team: Akhmat Grozny
- Number: 70

Youth career
- 2011–2014: RDYuSSh Makhachkala
- 2014–2019: Anzhi Makhachkala
- 2020: Dynamo-Moscow Makhachkala

Senior career*
Years	Team	Apps	(Gls)
2021	Makhachkala	16	(7)
2021–2025	Dynamo Makhachkala	93	(18)
2023–2024	→ Dynamo-2 Makhachkala	2	(1)
2025–	Akhmat Grozny	6	(0)
- * Club domestic league appearances and goals as of 2 November 2025

Abakar Gadzhiyavovich Gadzhiyev (Russian: Абакар Гаджиявович Гаджиев; born 31 December 2003) is a Russian football player who plays as a left winger or attacking midfielder for Akhmat Grozny. He has been deployed in other attacking positions throughout his career.

== Career ==
Gadzhiyev made his Russian Premier League debut for Dynamo Makhachkala on 21 July 2024 in a game against Khimki.

On 20 June 2025, Gadzhiyev signed a four-year contract with Akhmat Grozny.

== Career statistics ==
As of 2 November 2025

Club	Season	League			Cup		Total	
Club	Season	Division	Apps	Goals	Apps	Goals	Apps	Goals
Makhachkala	2020–21	Russian Second League	16	7	–		16	7
Dynamo Makhachkala	2021–22	Russian Second League	31	16	1	0	32	16
Dynamo Makhachkala	2022–23	Russian First League	27	1	3	0	30	1
Dynamo Makhachkala	2023–24	Russian First League	7	0	0	0	7	0
Dynamo Makhachkala	2024–25	Russian Premier League	28	1	7	3	35	4
Dynamo Makhachkala	Total		93	18	11	3	104	21
Dynamo-2 Makhachkala	2023	Russian Second League B	1	0	–		1	0
Dynamo-2 Makhachkala	2024	Russian Second League B	1	1	–		1	1
Dynamo-2 Makhachkala	Total		2	1	0	0	2	1
Akhmat Grozny	2025–26	Russian Premier League	6	0	4	0	10	0
Career total			117	26	15	3	132	29
