= Abdulpasha Dzhabrailov =

Russian footballer

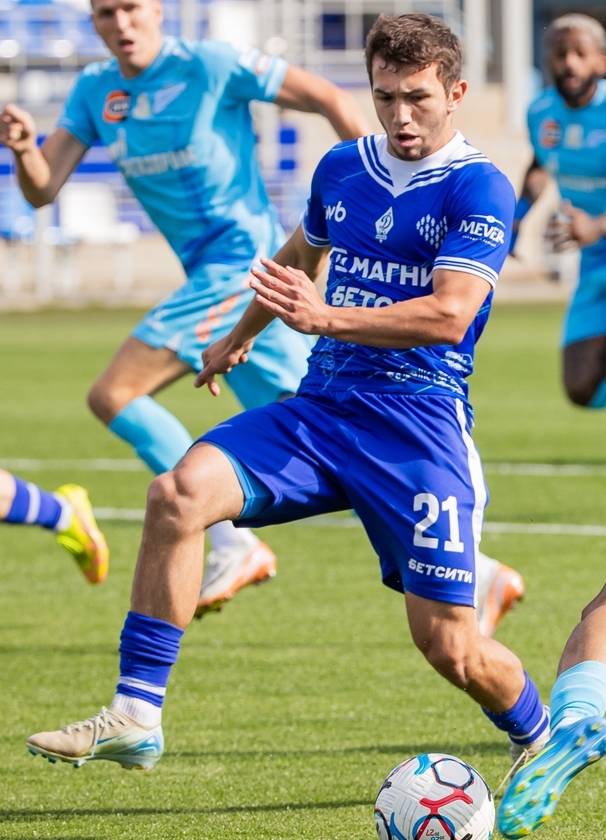

Personal information
- Full name: Abdulpasha Apasovich Dzhabrailov
- Date of birth: 24 November 2004 (age 21)
- Place of birth: Makhachkala, Russia
- Height: 1.77 m (5 ft 9 1/2 in)
- Position: Midfielder

Team information
- Current team: Dynamo Makhachkala
- Number: 21

Youth career
- –2019: Anzhi Makhachkala
- 2020–2021: Dynamo-Moscow Makhachkala
- 2022–2023: Dynamo Makhachkala

Senior career*
| Years | Team | Apps | (Gls) |
| 2023– | Dynamo Makhachkala | 39 | (0) |
| 2023–2024 | → Dynamo-2 Makhachkala | 21 | (2) |
| 2024 | → Mashuk-KMV Pyatigorsk (loan) | 14 | (0) |
- * Club domestic league appearances and goals as of 22 November 2026

Abdulpasha Apasovich Dzhabrailov (Russian: Абдулпаша Апасович Джабраилов; born 24 November 2004) is a Russian footballer who plays as a midfielder for Dynamo Makhachkala.

== Club career ==
Dzhabrailov made his debut in the Russian Second League for Dynamo-2 Makhachkala on 23 July 2023 in a game against Pobeda Khasavyurt.

He made his Russian Premier League debut for Dynamo Makhachkala on 8 March 2025 in a game against Dynamo Moscow.

== Career statistics ==
As of 22 November 2026

| Club | Season | League | | | Cup | | Other | | Total | |
| Club | Season | Division | Apps | Goals | Apps | Goals | Apps | Goals | Apps | Goals |
|---|---|---|---|---|---|---|---|---|---|---|
| Dynamo-2 Makhachkala | 2023 | Russian Second League B | 16 | 2 | — | | — | | 16 | 2 |
| Dynamo-2 Makhachkala | 2024 | Russian Second League B | 5 | 0 | — | | — | | 5 | 0 |
| Dynamo-2 Makhachkala | Total | | 21 | 2 | 0 | 0 | 0 | 0 | 21 | 2 |
| Dynamo Makhachkala | 2023–24 | Russian First League | 3 | 0 | 1 | 0 | — | | 4 | 0 |
| Dynamo Makhachkala | 2024–25 | Russian Premier League | 10 | 0 | 2 | 0 | — | | 12 | 0 |
| Dynamo Makhachkala | 2025–26 | Russian Premier League | 17 | 0 | 8 | 0 | 1 (Note: Appearances in relegation play-offs) | 0 | 26 | 0 |
| Dynamo Makhachkala | 2026–27 | Russian Premier League | 8 | 0 | 6 | 0 | — | | 14 | 0 |
| Dynamo Makhachkala | Total | | 38 | 0 | 17 | 0 | 1 | 0 | 56 | 0 |
| Mashuk-KMV (loan) | 2024–25 | Russian Second League A | 14 | 0 | 3 | 0 | — | | 17 | 0 |
| Career total | | | 72 | 2 | 20 | 0 | 1 | 0 | 93 | 2 |
