= Shamil Gadzhiyev =

Russian footballer

Personal information
- Full name: Shamil Gadzhiyevich Gadzhiyev
- Date of birth: 26 July 2005 (age 21)
- Place of birth: Moscow, Russia
- Height: 1.85 m (6 ft 1 in)
- Position: Attacking midfielder

Team information
- Current team: Pobeda Khasavyurt (on loan from Dynamo Makhachkala)
- Number: 53

Youth career
- –2018: SShOR No.63 Smena Moscow
- 2020–2022: Krasnodar
- 2022–2023: Dynamo Makhachkala

Senior career*
Years	Team	Apps	(Gls)
2023–	Dynamo Makhachkala	8	(1)
2023–	→ Dynamo-2 Makhachkala	38	(9)
2026	→ Naftan Novopolotsk (loan)	12	(0)
2026–	→ Pobeda Khasavyurt (loan)	4	(0)
- * Club domestic league appearances and goals as of 31 October 2026

Shamil Gadzhiyevich Gadzhiyev (Russian: Шамиль Гаджиевич Гаджиев; born 26 July 2005) is a Russian football player who plays as an attacking midfielder for Pobeda Khasavyurt on loan from Dynamo Makhachkala.

== Career ==
Gadzhiyev made his debut in the Russian Premier League for Dynamo Makhachkala on 15 March 2025 in a game against Krylia Sovetov Samara. He came on as a substitute in the 88th minute, and scored one minute later to establish the final score of 4–0 for Dynamo.

On 18 February 2026, Gadzhiyev was loaned to Belarusian club Naftan Novopolotsk until 10 December 2026. On 15 August 2026, Gadzhiyev left Naftan Novopolotsk.

== Personal life ==
He is the son of coach Gadzhi Gadzhiyev.

== Career statistics ==
As of 6 July 2026

Club	Season	League			Cup		Continental		Other		Total	
Club	Season	Division	Apps	Goals	Apps	Goals	Apps	Goals	Apps	Goals	Apps	Goals
Dynamo-2 Makhachkala	2023	Russian Second League B	19	6	–		–		–		19	6
Dynamo-2 Makhachkala	2024	Russian Second League B	12	3	–		–		–		12	3
Dynamo-2 Makhachkala	2025	Russian Second League B	7	0	–		–		–		7	0
Dynamo-2 Makhachkala	Total		38	9	0	0	0	0	0	0	38	9
Dynamo Makhachkala	2024–25	Russian Premier League	2	1	0	0	–		–		2	1
Dynamo Makhachkala	2025–26	Russian Premier League	6	0	8	0	–		–		14	0
Dynamo Makhachkala	Total		8	1	8	0	0	0	0	0	16	1
FC Naftan Novopolotsk (loan)	2026	Belarusian Premier League	12	0	0	0	–		–		12	0
Career total			58	10	8	0	0	0	0	0	66	10
