= Timur Magomedov =

Russian footballer

Personal information
- Full name: Timur Arsenovich Magomedov
- Date of birth: 20 December 2001 (age 24)
- Place of birth: Astrakhan, Russia
- Height: 1.96 m (6 ft 5 in)
- Position: Goalkeeper

Team information
- Current team: Dynamo Makhachkala
- Number: 39

Youth career
- –2010: Volgar Astrakhan
- 2010–2011: Olimpiya Astrakhan
- 2011–2014: Volgar Astrakhan
- 2014–2019: Anzhi Makhachkala

Senior career*
Years	Team	Apps	(Gls)
2019–2022	Anzhi Makhachkala	71	(0)
2022–	Dynamo Makhachkala	47	(0)
2023	→ Dynamo-2 Makhachkala	10	(0)
- * Club domestic league appearances and goals as of 22 November 2026

Timur Arsenovich Magomedov (Russian: Тимур Арсенович Магомедов; born 20 December 2001) is a Russian football player who plays as a goalkeeper for Dynamo Makhachkala.

== Career ==
Magomedov made his debut in the Russian Premier League for Dynamo Makhachkala on 15 March 2025 in a game against Krylia Sovetov Samara.

== Career statistics ==
As of 22 November 2026

Club	Season	League			Cup		Total	
Club	Season	Division	Apps	Goals	Apps	Goals	Apps	Goals
Anzhi Makhachkala	2019–20	Russian Second League	9	0	1	0	10	0
Anzhi Makhachkala	2020–21	Russian Second League	31	0	2	0	33	0
Anzhi Makhachkala	2021–22	Russian Second League	31	0	1	0	32	0
Anzhi Makhachkala	Total		71	0	4	0	75	0
Dynamo Makhachkala	2022–23	Russian First League	1	0	0	0	1	0
Dynamo Makhachkala	2023–24	Russian First League	12	0	0	0	12	0
Dynamo Makhachkala	2024–25	Russian Premier League	10	0	5	0	15	0
Dynamo Makhachkala	2025–26	Russian Premier League	13	0	3	0	16	0
Dynamo Makhachkala	2026–27	Russian Premier League	11	0	1	0	12	0
Dynamo Makhachkala	Total		47	0	9	0	56	0
Dynamo-2 Makhachkala	2023	Russian Second League B	10	0	—		10	0
Career total			128	0	13	0	141	0
