= Yevgeni Goshev =

Russian footballer (born 1997)

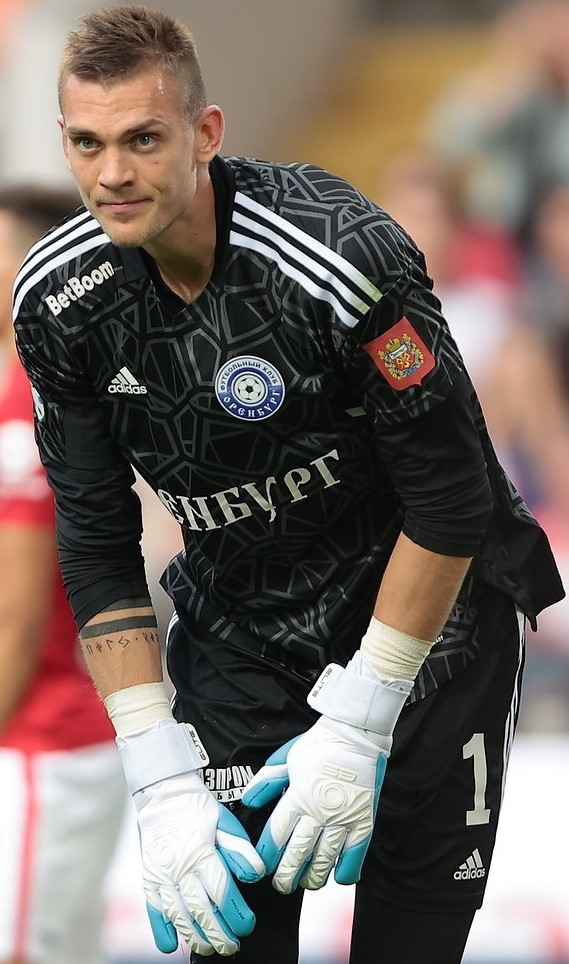
- Goshev with Orenburg in 2022

Personal information
- Full name: Yevgeni Nikolayevich Goshev
- Date of birth: 17 June 1997 (age 29)
- Place of birth: Voronezh, Russia
- Height: 1.97 m (6 ft 6 in)
- Position: Goalkeeper

Team information
- Current team: Turan
- Number: 1

Youth career
- 2010–2014: FCSh-73 Voronezh

Senior career*
Years	Team	Apps	(Gls)
2015–2018	Rostov	0	(0)
2018–2020	Shinnik Yaroslavl	6	(0)
2020–2023	Orenburg	26	(0)
2020	Orenburg-2	4	(0)
2023–2024	Dynamo Makhachkala	0	(0)
2024	→ Dynamo-2 Makhachkala	1	(0)
2024–2025	Tyumen	12	(0)
2025–	Turan	10	(0)

International career^{‡}
2015–2016	Russia U-19	4	(0)
2017	Russia U-21	1	(0)
- * Club domestic league appearances and goals as of 2 November 2025 ‡ National team caps and goals as of 28 March 2017

Yevgeni Nikolayevich Goshev (Russian: Евгений Николаевич Гошев; born 17 June 1997) is a Russian football player who plays as a goalkeeper for Kazakh club Turan.

== Club career ==
He played his first game for the main squad of Rostov on 24 September 2015 in a Russian Cup game against Tosno.

He made his Russian Football National League debut for Shinnik Yaroslavl on 1 September 2018 in a game against Nizhny Novgorod.

Goshev made his Russian Premier League debut for Orenburg on 16 July 2022 against Krylia Sovetov Samara.

Goshev's contract with Orenburg was terminated by mutual consent on 4 August 2023.

On 20 June 2024, Goshev left Dynamo Makhachkala by mutual consent.

== International career ==
=== Youth ===
Goshev made his debut for Russia U-19 on 10 October 2015 in a friendly match against Greece U-19.

== Career statistics ==
As of 25 May 2024

Club	Season	League			Cup		Continental		Other		Total	
Club	Season	Division	Apps	Goals	Apps	Goals	Apps	Goals	Apps	Goals	Apps	Goals
Rostov	2014–15	Russian Premier League	0	0	–		–		0	0	0	0
Rostov	2015–16	Russian Premier League	0	0	1	0	–		–		1	0
Rostov	2016–17	Russian Premier League	0	0	0	0	0	0	–		0	0
Rostov	2017–18	Russian Premier League	0	0	0	0	–		–		0	0
Rostov	Total		0	0	1	0	0	0	0	0	1	0
Shinnik Yaroslavl	2018–19	Russian First League	6	0	0	0	–		2 (Note: Appearances in the FNL Cup)	0	8	0
Shinnik Yaroslavl	2019–20	Russian First League	0	0	0	0	–		1	0	1	0
Shinnik Yaroslavl	2020–21	Russian First League	0	0	0	0	–		–		0	0
Shinnik Yaroslavl	Total		6	0	0	0	0	0	3	0	9	0
Orenburg	2020–21	Russian First League	1	0	1	0	–		–		2	0
Orenburg	2021–22	Russian First League	16	0	1	0	–		2 (Note: Appearances in the promotion play-offs)	0	19	0
Orenburg	2022–23	Russian Premier League	9	0	3	0	–		–		12	0
Orenburg	2023–24	Russian Premier League	0	0	1	0	–		–		1	0
Orenburg	Total		26	0	6	0	0	0	2	0	34	0
Orenburg-2	2020–21	Russian Second League	4	0	–		–		–		4	0
Dynamo Makhachkala	2023–24	Russian First League	0	0	1	0	–		–		1	0
Dynamo-2 Makhachkala	2024	Russian Second League B	1	0	–		–		–		1	0
Career total			37	0	8	0	0	0	5	0	50	0
