= Glushko =

Glushko (Russian: Глушко) is a surname of Ukrainian descent, that may refer to:

== People ==
- Julia Glushko (born 1990), an Israeli tennis player
- Lina Glushko (born 2000), an Israeli tennis player
- Robert J. Glushko (born 1953), a professor at the University of California, Berkeley
- Valentin Glushko (Valentyn Hlushko, 1908-1989), a Ukrainian Soviet engineer

== Crater ==
- Glushko (crater), a young impact crater on the Moon

== See also ==
- 6357 Glushko, a Main-belt Asteroid
- Hlushko
- Halushko
