= Ilya Kirsh =

Russian footballer (born 2004)

Personal information
- Full name: Ilya Yevgenyevich Kirsh
- Date of birth: 21 September 2004 (age 22)
- Place of birth: Vladivostok, Russia
- Height: 1.91 m (6 ft 3 in)
- Position: Centre-back

Team information
- Current team: Baltika Kaliningrad
- Number: 3

Youth career
- Zenit St. Petersburg

Senior career*
Years	Team	Apps	(Gls)
2021–2026	Zenit St. Petersburg	0	(0)
2021–2023	→ Zenit-2 St. Petersburg	29	(1)
2023	→ Rostov (loan)	0	(0)
2024	→ Rostov-2 (loan)	8	(0)
2024–2025	→ Dynamo Makhachkala (loan)	3	(0)
2025	→ Chernomorets Novorossiysk (loan)	16	(0)
2026	→ Pari Nizhny Novgorod (loan)	10	(0)
2026–	Baltika Kaliningrad	1	(0)

International career^{‡}
2018	Russia U15	5	(0)
2019–2020	Russia U16	3	(0)
2021	Russia U18	4	(0)
2023	Russia U19	1	(0)
2023–	Russia U21	9	(1)
- * Club domestic league appearances and goals as of 8 November 2026 ‡ National team caps and goals as of 18 November 2025

Ilya Yevgenyevich Kirsh (Russian: Илья Евгеньевич Кирш; born 21 September 2004) is a Russian football player who plays as a centre-back for Baltika Kaliningrad.

== Club career ==
Kirsh joined Russian Premier League club Rostov on loan on 13 September 2023. He made his debut for Rostov on 20 September 2023 in a Russian Cup game against Rubin Kazan.

On 14 June 2024, Kirsh moved on a new loan to Dynamo Makhachkala. He made his Russian Premier League debut against his main club Zenit St. Petersburg on 2 November 2024.

On 2 July 2025, Kirsh was loaned by Chernomorets Novorossiysk. On 19 February 2026, he moved on a new loan to Pari Nizhny Novgorod, with an option to buy.

On 9 July 2026, Kirsh signed a four-year contract with Baltika Kaliningrad.

== Career statistics ==
As of match played 8 November 2026

Appearances and goals by club, season and competition
Club	Season	League			Russian Cup		Total	
Club	Season	Division	Apps	Goals	Apps	Goals	Apps	Goals
Zenit-2 Saint Petersburg	2021–22	Russian Second League	4	1	—		4	1
Zenit-2 Saint Petersburg	2022–23	Russian Second League	19	0	—		19	0
Zenit-2 Saint Petersburg	2023–24	Russian Second League	6	0	—		6	0
Zenit-2 Saint Petersburg	Total		29	1	—		29	1
Zenit St. Petersburg	2022–23	Russian Premier League	0	0	0	0	0	0
Rostov (loan)	2023–24	Russian Premier League	0	0	3	0	3	0
Rostov-2 (loan)	2024	Russian Second League B	9	0	—		9	0
Dynamo Makhachkala (loan)	2024–25	Russian Premier League	3	0	4	0	7	0
Chernomorets Novorossiysk (loan)	2025–26	Russian First League	16	0	1	0	17	0
Pari Nizhny Novgorod (loan)	2025–26	Russian Premier League	10	0	—		10	0
Baltika Kaliningrad	2026–27	Russian Premier League	1	0	5	2	6	2
Career total			68	1	13	2	81	3
