= Temirkan Sundukov =

Russian football player

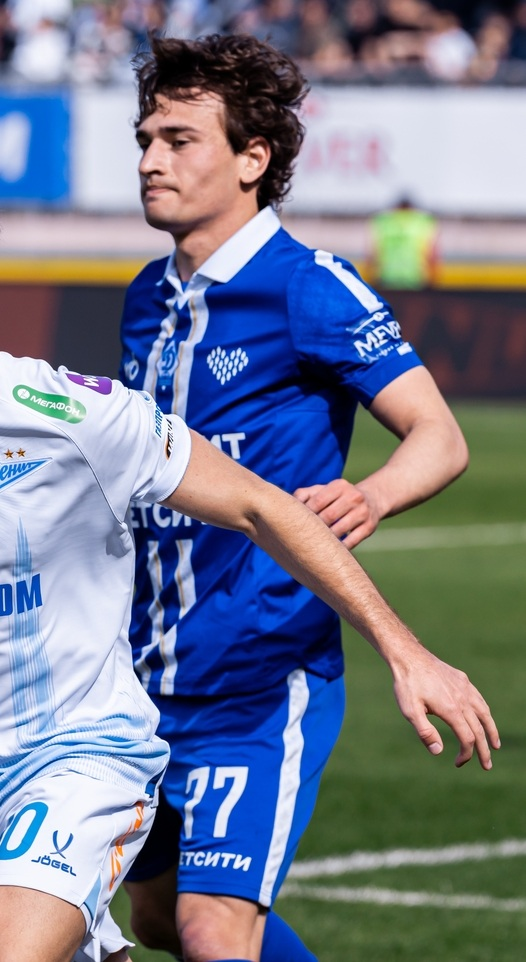
- Sundukov with Dynamo Makhachkala in 2026

Personal information
- Full name: Temirkan Romanovich Sundukov
- Date of birth: 17 September 2001 (age 25)
- Place of birth: Nalchik, Russia
- Height: 1.77 m (5 ft 9 1/2 in)
- Positions: Left back; left-back

Team information
- Current team: Dynamo Makhachkala
- Number: 77

Youth career
- –2018: Spartak Nalchik
- 2018: Lokomotiv Moscow

Senior career*
Years	Team	Apps	(Gls)
2019–2020	Spartak Nalchik	16	(0)
2020	Torpedo Moscow	1	(0)
2021–2022	Spartak Nalchik	38	(1)
2022–	Dynamo Makhachkala	109	(3)
2023	→ Dynamo-2 Makhachkala	2	(0)
- * Club domestic league appearances and goals as of 22 November 2026

Temirkan Romanovich Sundukov (Russian: Темиркан Романович Сундуков; born 17 September 2001) is a Russian football player who plays for Dynamo Makhachkala. He is mostly deployed as a left defender or a left-back, but also can play on the right.

== Club career ==
Sundukov made his debut in the Russian Professional Football League for Spartak Nalchik on 16 July 2019 in a game against Anzhi Makhachkala. He made his Russian Football National League debut for Torpedo Moscow on 17 October 2020 in a game against Neftekhimik Nizhnekamsk.

He made his Russian Premier League debut for Dynamo Makhachkala on 21 July 2024 in a game against Khimki.

== Career statistics ==
As of match played 22 November 2026

Appearances and goals by club, season and competition
Club	Season	League			Cup		Other		Total	
Club	Season	Division	Apps	Goals	Apps	Goals	Apps	Goals	Apps	Goals
Spartak Nalchik	2018–19	Russian Second League	0	0	—		—		0	0
Spartak Nalchik	2019–20	Russian Second League	16	0	2	0	—		18	0
Spartak Nalchik	Total		16	0	2	0	0	0	18	0
Torpedo Moscow	2020–21	Russian First League	1	0	0	0	—		1	0
Spartak Nalchik	2020–21	Russian Second League	11	0	—		—		11	0
Spartak Nalchik	2021–22	Russian Second League	27	1	2	0	—		29	1
Spartak Nalchik	Total		38	1	2	0	0	0	40	1
Dynamo Makhachkala	2022–23	Russian First League	14	0	1	0	—		15	0
Dynamo Makhachkala	2023–24	Russian First League	26	1	1	0	—		27	1
Dynamo Makhachkala	2024–25	Russian Premier League	26	1	8	0	—		34	1
Dynamo Makhachkala	2025–26	Russian Premier League	29	0	8	1	2 (Note: Appearances in relegation play-offs)	0	39	1
Dynamo Makhachkala	2026–27	Russian Premier League	14	1	4	0	—		18	1
Dynamo Makhachkala	Total		109	3	22	1	2	0	133	4
Dynamo-2 Makhachkala	2023	Russian Second League B	2	0	—		—		2	0
Career total			166	4	26	1	2	0	194	5
