= Ilyas Akhmedov =

Russian footballer (born 2007)

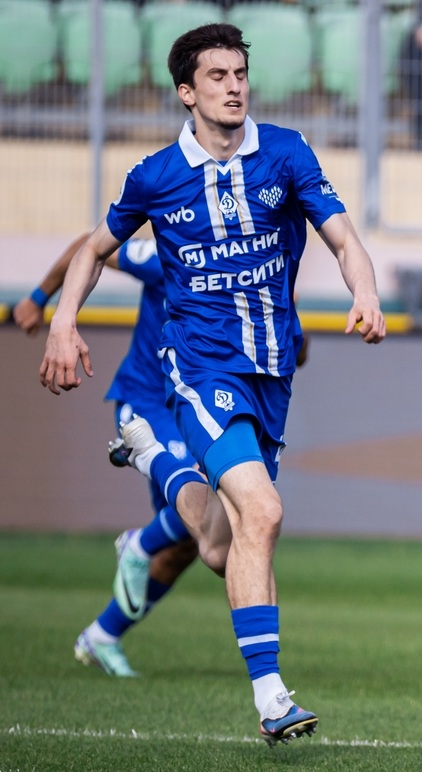
- Akhmedov with Dynamo Makhachkala in 2026

Personal information
- Full name: Ilyas Sultanovich Akhmedov
- Date of birth: 2 April 2007 (age 19)
- Height: 1.89 m (6 ft 2 in)
- Position: Centre-back

Team information
- Current team: Dynamo Makhachkala
- Number: 43

Youth career
- Dynamo Makhachkala

Senior career*
Years	Team	Apps	(Gls)
2025–	Dynamo-2 Makhachkala	11	(0)
2025–	Dynamo Makhachkala	14	(0)
- * Club domestic league appearances and goals as of 1 November 2026

Ilyas Sultanovich Akhmedov (Russian: Ильяс Султанович Ахмедов; born 2 April 2007) is a Russian football player who plays as a centre-back for Dynamo Makhachkala.

== Career ==
Akmedov was raised in the academy of Dynamo Makhachkala. He made his senior team debut for Dynamo on 30 July 2025 in a Russian Cup game against Pari Nizhny Novgorod. He debuted in the Russian Premier League for Dynamo on 13 March 2026 in a game against Orenburg.

== Career statistics ==
As of 1 November 2026

Club	Season	League			Cup		Other		Total	
Club	Season	Division	Apps	Goals	Apps	Goals	Apps	Goals	Apps	Goals
Dynamo-2 Makhachkala	2024	Russian Second League B	9	0	—		—		9	0
Dynamo-2 Makhachkala	2025	Russian Second League B	2	0	—		—		2	0
Dynamo-2 Makhachkala	Total		11	0	0	0	0	0	11	0
Dynamo Makhachkala	2024–25	Russian Premier League	0	0	0	0	—		0	0
Dynamo Makhachkala	2025–26	Russian Premier League	7	0	7	0	2 (Note: Appearances in relegation play-offs)	0	16	0
Dynamo Makhachkala	2026–27	Russian Premier League	7	0	4	0	—		11	0
Dynamo Makhachkala	Total		14	0	11	0	2	0	27	0
Career total			25	0	11	0	2	0	38	0
