= Zalimkhan Yusupov =

Zalimkhan Yusupov may refer to:

- Zalimkhan Yusupov (footballer) (born 1998), Russian footballer
- Zalimkhan Yusupov (freestyle wrestler) (born 1984), Russian and Tajikistani freestyle wrestler
