= FC Sakhalinets Moscow =

Russian football team based in Moscow

Sakhalinets Moscow
- Full name: Football Club Sakhalinets Moscow
- Founded: 2020
- Manager: Vacant
- League: N/A
- 2023: Russian Second League, Division B, Group 3, 2nd
- Website: https://fc-sakhalinec.com/

FC Sakhalinets Moscow (Russian: ФК «Сахалинец» Москва) is an amateur, turned professional, Russian football team based in Moscow.

== History ==
The club was founded in 2020 by Mikhail Litvin. Litvin was born in Sakhalin and named the club in reference to that ("Sakhalinets" means "a person from Sakhalin").

For the 2022–23 season, the club obtained a professional license for the Russian Second League. In January 2024, the club announced they will drop out of all competitions due to lack of sponsorship.
