= Jan Đapo =

Slovenian footballer (born 2002)

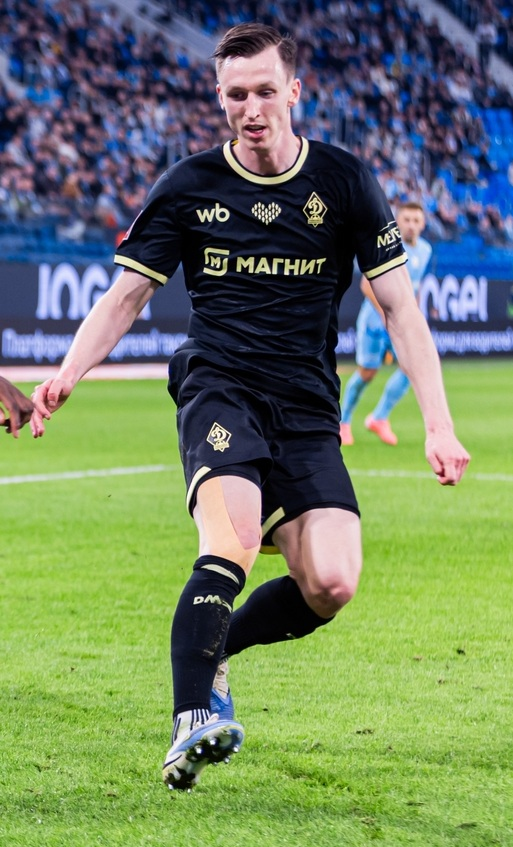
- Đapo with Dynamo Makhachkala in 2026

Personal information
- Date of birth: 17 September 2002 (age 24)
- Place of birth: Brežice, Slovenia
- Height: 1.85 m (6 ft 1 in)
- Position: Left-back

Youth career
- –2017: Brežice
- 2017–2018: Krško
- 2019: Brežice
- 2019–2021: Krka

Senior career*
| Years | Team | Apps | (Gls) |
| 2021–2022 | Krka | 17 | (1) |
| 2022–2023 | Mura | 0 | (0) |
| 2022 | → Krka (loan) | 8 | (0) |
| 2022–2023 | → Krka (loan) | 21 | (2) |
| 2023–2024 | Domžale | 31 | (3) |
| 2024–2026 | Dynamo Makhachkala | 23 | (1) |

International career
| 2023–2025 | Slovenia U21 | 5 | (0) |
- * Club domestic league appearances and goals as of 2 May 2026

Jan Đapo (born 17 September 2002) is a Slovenian footballer who plays as a left-back.

== Club career ==
On 24 July 2024, Đapo left Domžale and signed a long-term contract with Russian Premier League newcomers Dynamo Makhachkala for a reported transfer fee of €300,000. He made his league debut for Dynamo Makhachkala on 10 August 2024 in a game against Lokomotiv Moscow. His contract was mutually terminated on 18 August 2026.
