= Aleksandr Sandrachuk =

Russian footballer

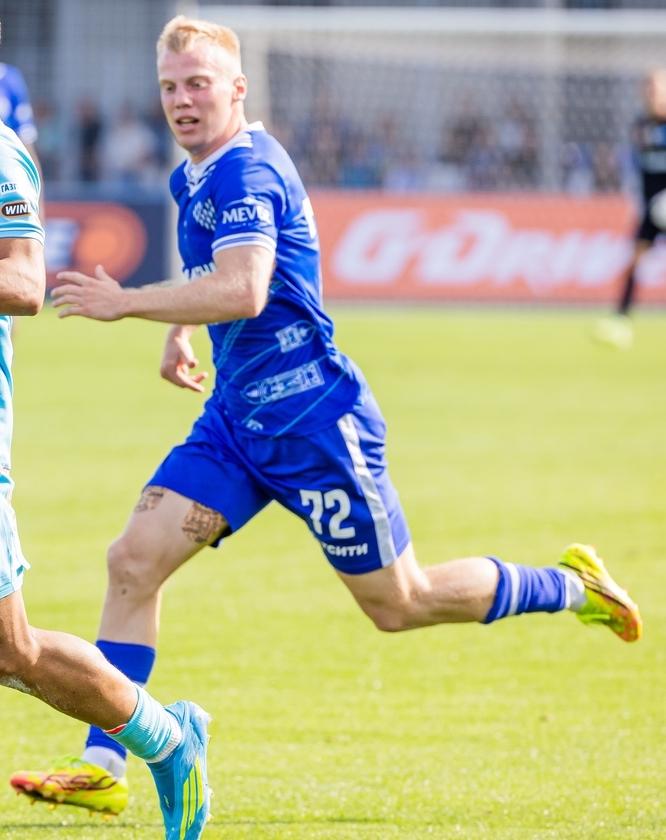

Personal information
- Full name: Aleksandr Sergeyevich Sandrachuk
- Date of birth: 2 January 2002 (age 24)
- Place of birth: Sestroretsk, Leningrad Oblast Russia
- Height: 1.76 m (5 ft 9 in)
- Positions: Midfielder; full-back

Team information
- Current team: Dynamo Makhachkala
- Number: 72

Youth career
- 2080–2011: SDYuSShOR im. V. Korenkova Sesrtoretsk
- 2012–2020: Zenit St. Petersburg

Senior career*
Years	Team	Apps	(Gls)
2020–2022	Zenit-2 St. Petersburg	27	(2)
2022–2023	Ufa	12	(1)
2023–	Dynamo Makhachkala	52	(1)
2023–	→ Dynamo-2 Makhachkala	3	(0)

International career^{‡}
2019	Russia U-17	1	(0)
2019	Russia U-19	4	(0)
- * Club domestic league appearances and goals as of 8 November 2026 ‡ National team caps and goals as of 12 October 2019

Aleksandr Sergeyevich Sandrachuk (Russian: Александр Сергеевич Сандрачук; born 2 January 2002) is a Russian football player who plays as a left midfielder for Dynamo Makhachkala. He is also deployed as a right midfielder, or a full-back on either side.

== Career ==
Sandrachuk made his Russian Premier League debut for Dynamo Makhachkala on 21 July 2024 in a game against Khimki.

== Career statistics ==
As of match played 8 November 2026

Appearances and goals by club, season and competition
Club	Season	League			Cup		Other		Total	
Club	Season	Division	Apps	Goals	Apps	Goals	Apps	Goals	Apps	Goals
Zenit-2 Saint Petersburg	2020–21	Russian Second League	3	0	—		—		3	0
Zenit-2 Saint Petersburg	2021–22	Russian Second League	24	2	—		—		24	2
Zenit-2 Saint Petersburg	Total		27	2	0	0	0	0	27	2
Ufa	2022–23	Russian First League	12	1	0	0	—		12	1
Dynamo Makhachkala	2023–24	Russian First League	29	0	1	0	—		30	0
Dynamo Makhachkala	2024–25	Russian Premier League	10	0	4	0	—		14	0
Dynamo Makhachkala	2025–26	Russian Premier League	3	0	0	0	2 (Note: Appearances in relegation play-offs)	0	5	0
Dynamo Makhachkala	2026–27	Russian Premier League	10	1	4	0	—		14	1
Dynamo Makhachkala	Total		52	1	9	0	2	0	63	1
Dynamo-2 Makhachkala	2023	Russian Second League B	2	0	—		—		2	0
Dynamo-2 Makhachkala	2026	Russian Second League B	1	0	—		—		1	0
Dynamo-2 Makhachkala	Total		3	0	0	0	0	0	3	0
Career total			94	4	9	0	2	0	105	4
