= Nikita Glushkov =

Nikita Glushkov may refer to:

- Nikita Glushkov (footballer, born 1992), Russian football player
- Nikita Glushkov (footballer, born 1994), Russian football player
- Nikita Glushkov (footballer, born 1999), Russian football player
