= Razhab Magomedov =

Russian footballer

Personal information
- Full name: Razhab Mutaalimovich Magomedov
- Date of birth: 3 October 2000 (age 26)
- Place of birth: Oktyabrskoye, Khasavyurtovsky District, Republic of Dagestan, Russia
- Height: 1.80 m (5 ft 11 in)
- Position: Attacking midfielder

Team information
- Current team: Dynamo Makhachkala
- Number: 9

Youth career
- 2008–2012: RDYuSSh Makhachkala
- 2012–2019: Anzhi Makhachkala

Senior career*
Years	Team	Apps	(Gls)
2019–2022	Anzhi Makhachkala	60	(18)
2022–	Dynamo Makhachkala	102	(12)
- * Club domestic league appearances and goals as of 22 November 2026

Razhab Mutaalimovich Magomedov (Russian: Ража́б Мутаали́мович Магоме́дов; born 3 October 2000) is a Russian football player who plays as an attacking midfielder or centre-forward for Dynamo Makhachkala.

== Career ==
Magomedov made his Russian Premier League debut for Dynamo Makhachkala on 21 July 2024 in a game against Khimki.

== Career statistics ==
As of match played 22 November 2026

Appearances and goals by club, season and competition
Club	Season	League			Cup		Other		Total	
Club	Season	Division	Apps	Goals	Apps	Goals	Apps	Goals	Apps	Goals
Anzhi Makhachkala	2019–20	Russian Second League	15	1	0	0	—		15	1
Anzhi Makhachkala	2020–21	Russian Second League	13	3	1	0	—		14	3
Anzhi Makhachkala	2021–22	Russian Second League	32	14	2	0	—		34	14
Anzhi Makhachkala	Total		60	18	3	0	0	0	63	18
Dynamo Makhachkala	2022–23	Russian First League	31	5	3	2	—		34	7
Dynamo Makhachkala	2023–24	Russian First League	30	7	1	0	—		31	7
Dynamo Makhachkala	2024–25	Russian Premier League	25	0	8	0	—		33	0
Dynamo Makhachkala	2025–26	Russian Premier League	14	0	7	2	1 (Note: Appearance in relegation play-offs)	0	22	2
Dynamo Makhachkala	2026–27	Russian Premier League	2	0	4	0	—		6	0
Dynamo Makhachkala	Total		102	12	23	4	1	0	126	16
Career total			162	30	26	4	1	0	189	34
