= Kirill Zinovich =

Belarusian footballer (born 2003)

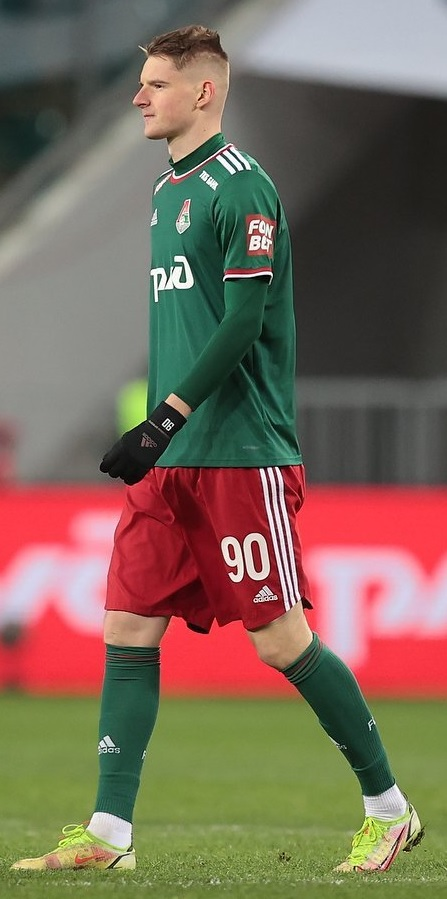
- Zinovich with Lokomotiv Moscow in 2021

Personal information
- Full name: Kirill Aleksandrovich Zinovich
- Date of birth: 5 March 2003 (age 23)
- Place of birth: Minsk, Belarus
- Height: 1.94 m (6 ft 4 in)
- Position: Attacking midfielder

Team information
- Current team: Dynamo Makhachkala
- Number: 19

Youth career
- 2014–2020: Minsk

Senior career*
Years	Team	Apps	(Gls)
2020–2021	Minsk	20	(4)
2021–2022	Lokomotiv Moscow	3	(0)
2021–2022	→ Kazanka Moscow	13	(0)
2022–2024	Vitória de Guimarães B	25	(0)
2024–	Dynamo Makhachkala	56	(2)

International career^{‡}
2019	Belarus U17	3	(1)
2021	Belarus U19	3	(1)
2021–2023	Belarus U21	21	(2)
2025–	Belarus	1	(0)
- * Club domestic league appearances and goals as of 22 November 2026 ‡ National team caps and goals as of 20 March 2025

Kirill Aleksandrovich Zinovich (Belarusian: Кірыл Аляксандравіч Зіновіч; Russian: Кирилл Александрович Зинович; born 5 March 2003) is a Belarusian footballer who plays as an attacking midfielder for Russian club Dynamo Makhachkala and the Belarus national team.

== Club career ==
On 2 July 2021, he signed a 5-year contract with Russian Premier League club Lokomotiv Moscow. He made his European debut for Lokomotiv on 25 November 2021 in an Europa League game against Lazio. He made his RPL debut on 29 November 2021 in a game against Arsenal Tula.

On 1 September 2022, Zinovich signed a three-year contract with Vitória de Guimarães in Portugal.

== Personal life ==
His brother Dzmitry Zinovich is also a professional footballer.

== Career statistics ==
As of match played 22 November 2026

Appearances and goals by club, season and competition
Club	Season	League			Cup		Europe		Other		Total	
Club	Season	Division	Apps	Goals	Apps	Goals	Apps	Goals	Apps	Goals	Apps	Goals
Minsk	2020	Belarusian Premier League	9	1	1	0	—		—		10	1
Minsk	2021	Belarusian Premier League	11	3	2	0	—		—		13	3
Minsk	Total		20	4	3	0	0	0	0	0	23	4
Kazanka Moscow	2021–22	Russian Second League	13	0	—		—		—		13	0
Lokomotiv Moscow	2021–22	Russian Premier League	3	0	1	0	1 (Note: Appearance in the UEFA Europa League)	0	—		5	0
Vitória de Guimarães B	2022–23	Liga 3	20	0	—		—		—		20	0
Vitória de Guimarães B	2023–24	Campeonato de Portugal	5	0	—		—		—		5	0
Vitória de Guimarães B	Total		25	0	0	0	0	0	0	0	25	0
Dynamo Makhachkala	2023–24	Russian First League	11	0	—		—		—		11	0
Dynamo Makhachkala	2024–25	Russian Premier League	26	1	7	0	—		—		33	1
Dynamo Makhachkala	2025–26	Russian Premier League	11	0	3	0	—		1 (Note: Appearance in relegation play-offs)	0	15	0
Dynamo Makhachkala	2026–27	Russian Premier League	8	1	4	0	—		—		12	1
Dynamo Makhachkala	Total		56	2	14	0	0	0	1	0	71	2
Career total			117	6	18	0	1	0	1	0	137	6

=== International ===
As of match played 20 March 2025

Appearances and goals by national team and year
National team	Year	Apps	Goals
Belarus	2025	1	0
Total		1	0
