= Halushko =

Halushko Galushko Golushko (Ukrainian: Галушко), from Ukrainian: галушка, meaning halushka, traditional dumpling-like food, is a gender-neutral Ukrainian surname. Notable people with the surname include:

- Illya Halushko, acoustic guitar musician member of Ukrainian band Esthetic Education
- Ivan Galushko, musician from Belarusian rock band Lyapis Trubetskoy
- Mykola Halushko, Ukrainian politician
- Nikolai Golushko, Soviet and later Russian KGB officer
- Natalya Galushko, Belarusian long-distance runner

== See also ==
- Halushka
- Hlushko (Ukrainian: Глушко)
- Galushko
