= Mutalip Alibekov =

Russian football player

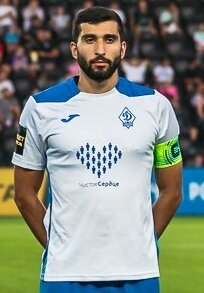
- Alibekov with Dynamo Makhachkala in 2022

Personal information
- Full name: Mutalip Omarovich Alibekov
- Date of birth: 18 June 1997 (age 29)
- Place of birth: Makhachkala, Russia
- Height: 1.80 m (5 ft 11 in)
- Position: Centre back

Team information
- Current team: Dynamo Makhachkala
- Number: 99

Youth career
- CSKA Moscow

Senior career*
Years	Team	Apps	(Gls)
2016–2017	CSKA Moscow	0	(0)
2017–2019	Khimki	9	(0)
2018	→ Khimki-M	2	(0)
2019	→ Baltika Kaliningrad (loan)	8	(0)
2019–2021	Baltika Kaliningrad	6	(0)
2020	→ Smolevichi (loan)	24	(0)
2021	→ Legion Dynamo (loan)	13	(0)
2021–	Dynamo Makhachkala	134	(3)

International career
2015	Russia U18	10	(0)
2015–2016	Russia U19	7	(0)
- * Club domestic league appearances and goals as of 22 November 2026

Mutalip Omarovich Alibekov (Russian: Муталип Омарович Алибеков; born 18 June 1997) is a Russian football player who plays as a centre-back for Dynamo Makhachkala.

== Club career ==
Alibekov made his debut for the main squad of CSKA Moscow in the Russian Cup game against Yenisey Krasnoyarsk on 21 September 2016.

He made his Russian Football National League debut for Khimki on 16 September 2017 in a game against Tambov.

He made his Russian Premier League debut for Dynamo Makhachkala on 21 July 2024 in a game against Khimki.

== Career statistics ==
As of match played 22 November 2026

Appearances and goals by club, season and competition
Club	Season	League			Cup		Europe		Other		Total	
Club	Season	Division	Apps	Goals	Apps	Goals	Apps	Goals	Apps	Goals	Apps	Goals
CSKA Moscow	2016–17	Russian Premier League	0	0	1	0	0	0	—		1	0
Khimki	2017–18	Russian First League	9	0	—		—		—		9	0
Khimki	2018–19	Russian First League	0	0	0	0	—		—		0	0
Khimki	Total		9	0	0	0	0	0	0	0	9	0
Khimki-M	2018–19	Russian Second League	2	0	—		—		—		2	0
Baltika Kaliningrad (loan)	2018–19	Russian First League	8	0	—		—		—		8	0
Baltika Kaliningrad	2019–20	Russian First League	6	0	0	0	—		—		6	0
Baltika Kaliningrad	2021–22	Russian First League	0	0	—		—		—		0	0
Baltika Kaliningrad	Total		6	0	0	0	0	0	0	0	6	0
Smolevichi (loan)	2020	Belarusian Premier League	24	0	1	0	—		—		25	0
Legion Dynamo (loan)	2020–21	Russian Second League	13	0	—		—		—		13	0
Dynamo Makhachkala	2021–22	Russian Second League	27	1	—		—		—		27	1
Dynamo Makhachkala	2022–23	Russian First League	31	0	3	0	—		—		34	0
Dynamo Makhachkala	2023–24	Russian First League	30	2	0	0	—		—		30	2
Dynamo Makhachkala	2024–25	Russian Premier League	15	0	4	0	—		—		19	0
Dynamo Makhachkala	2025–26	Russian Premier League	17	0	6	0	—		2 (Note: Appearances in relegation play-offs)	0	25	0
Dynamo Makhachkala	2026–27	Russian Premier League	14	0	1	0	—		—		15	0
Dynamo Makhachkala	Total		134	3	14	0	0	0	2	0	150	3
Career total			196	3	16	0	0	0	2	0	212	3
