= Valentin Paltsev =

Russian footballer

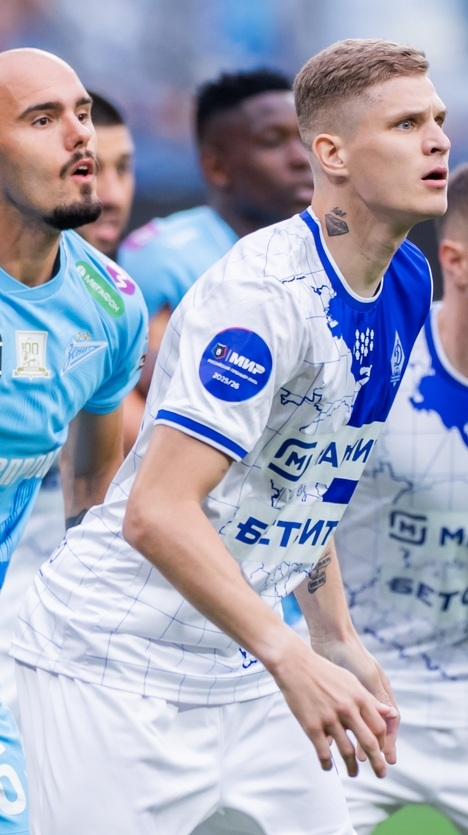
- Paltsev with Dynamo Makhachkala in 2025

Personal information
- Full name: Valentin Dmitriyevich Paltsev
- Date of birth: 12 July 2001 (age 25)
- Place of birth: Nizhny Novgorod, Russia
- Height: 1.81 m (5 ft 11 in)
- Positions: Right-back; centre-back

Team information
- Current team: Krasnodar
- Number: 17

Youth career
- 2010–2017: DYuSSh Nizhniy Novgorod
- 2018: Nizhny Novgorod

Senior career*
Years	Team	Apps	(Gls)
2019–2020	Spartak Bogorodsk (amateur)		
2020–2022	Volna Nizhny Novgorod Oblast	37	(5)
2022	KAMAZ Naberezhnye Chelny	12	(0)
2022–2023	Khimki	0	(0)
2022–2023	→ KAMAZ Naberezhnye Chelny (loan)	27	(3)
2023–2024	KAMAZ Naberezhnye Chelny	31	(2)
2024–2026	Dynamo Makhachkala	35	(0)
2025–2026	→ Krasnodar (loan)	7	(0)
2026–	Krasnodar	20	(0)

International career^{‡}
2024–	Russia	3	(0)
- * Club domestic league appearances and goals as of 22 November 2026 ‡ National team caps and goals as of 27 March 2026

Valentin Dmitriyevich Paltsev (Russian: Валентин Дмитриевич Пальцев; born 12 July 2001) is a Russian football player who plays as a centre-back for Russian Premier League club Krasnodar and the Russia national team.

== Club career ==
=== Dynamo Makhachkala ===
On 13 June 2024, Paltsev signed with Dynamo Makhachkala, recently promoted to the Russian Premier League for the first time in club's history.

He made his debut in the RPL for Dynamo Makhachkala on 21 July 2024 in a game against Khimki.

=== Krasnodar ===
On 4 September 2025, fellow Russian Premier League club Krasnodar announced the loan signing of Paltsev, with the obligation to buy set to be triggered on 23 January 2026.

== International career ==
Paltsev was first called up to the Russia national team for 2024 LPBank Cup in September 2024. He made his debut on 5 September 2024 in a game against Vietnam.

== Career statistics ==
=== Club ===
As of match played 22 November 2026

Appearances and goals by club, season and competition
Club	Season	League			Cup		Total	
Club	Season	Division	Apps	Goals	Apps	Goals	Apps	Goals
Volna Kovernino	2020–21	Russian Second League	18	0	0	0	18	0
Volna Kovernino	2021–22	Russian Second League	19	5	2	0	21	5
Volna Kovernino	Total		37	5	2	0	39	5
KAMAZ	2021–22	Russian Second League	12	0	1	0	13	0
KAMAZ (loan)	2022–23	Russian First League	27	3	3	0	30	3
KAMAZ	2023–24	Russian First League	31	2	1	1	32	3
KAMAZ	Club total		70	5	5	1	75	6
Dynamo Makhachkala	2024–25	Russian Premier League	28	0	6	0	34	0
Dynamo Makhachkala	2025–26	Russian Premier League	7	0	3	1	10	1
Dynamo Makhachkala	Total		35	0	9	1	44	1
Krasnodar (loan)	2025–26	Russian Premier League	7	0	5	0	12	0
Krasnodar	2025–26	Russian Premier League	10	0	5	0	15	0
Krasnodar	2026–27	Russian Premier League	10	0	5	0	15	0
Krasnodar	Total		20	0	10	0	30	0
Krasnodar	Club total		27	0	15	0	42	0
Career total			169	10	31	2	200	12

=== International ===
As of match played 27 March 2026

Appearances and goals by national team and year
National team	Year	Apps	Goals
Russia	2024	2	0
Russia	2026	1	0
Total		3	0
