= Houssem Mrezigue =

Algerian footballer (born 2000)

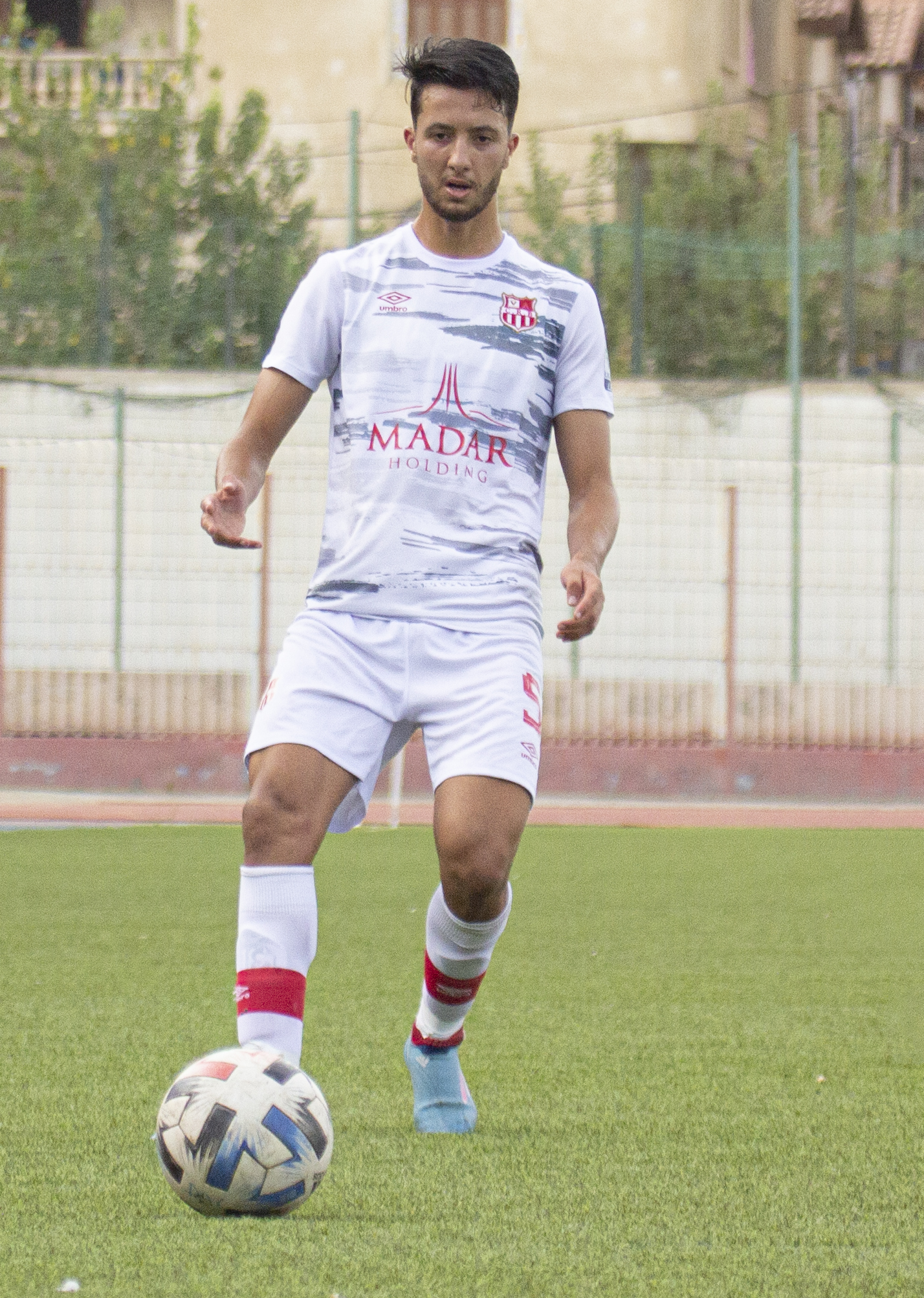
- Mrezigue with CR Belouizdad in 2022

Personal information
- Full name: Houssem Eddine Mrezigue
- Date of birth: 23 March 2000 (age 26)
- Place of birth: Aïn Arnat, Algeria
- Height: 1.85 m (6 ft 1 in)
- Position: Defensive midfielder

Team information
- Current team: Dynamo Makhachkala
- Number: 16

Youth career
- –2019: ES Sétif
- 2019–2020: MC Alger

Senior career*
Years	Team	Apps	(Gls)
2020–2024	CR Belouizdad	81	(3)
2023	→ Vizela (loan)	0	(0)
2024–	Dynamo Makhachkala	63	(4)

International career^{‡}
2019	Algeria U23		
2021–	Algeria	12	(0)
Medal record
Men's football
Representing Algeria
FIFA Arab Cup
Winner	2021 Qatar
- * Club domestic league appearances and goals as of 1 November 2026 ‡ National team caps and goals as of 12 December 2025

Houssem Eddine Mrezigue (Arabic: حسام الدين مرزيق; born 23 March 2000) is an Algerian professional footballer who plays as a defensive midfielder for Russian club Dynamo Makhachkala and the Algeria national team.

== Career ==
In July 2020, he signed a four-year contract with CR Belouizdad. On 29 August 2023, CR Belouizdad sent Mrezigue on loan to Primeira Liga side Vizela, with a future option to make the move permanent. On 5 February 2024, he returned to CR Belouizdad after an unsuccessful experience with Vizela.

On 31 July 2024, Mrezigue signed with Russian Premier League newcomer Dynamo Makhachkala. On 11 September 2026, his Dynamo contract was extended until June 2028.

== International career ==
He made his debut for the Algeria national football team on 1 December 2021 in a 2021 FIFA Arab Cup game against Sudan.

Mrezigue was part of the Algeria squad that finished runners-up in the 2022 African Nations Championship (which took place in 2023 due to the COVID-19 pandemic in Africa), and was elected Player of the Tournament.

== Career statistics ==
=== Club ===
As of match played 1 November 2026

Appearances and goals by club, season and competition
Club	Season	League			National Cup		Continental		Other		Total	
Club	Season	Division	Apps	Goals	Apps	Goals	Apps	Goals	Apps	Goals	Apps	Goals
CR Belouizdad	2020–21	Algerian Ligue 1	34	1	0	0	9 (Note: Appearances in CAF Champions League)	0	—		43	1
CR Belouizdad	2021–22	Algerian Ligue 1	22	1	0	0	11	1	—		33	2
CR Belouizdad	2022–23	Algerian Ligue 1	14	1	0	0	10	0	—		24	1
CR Belouizdad	2023–24	Algerian Ligue 1	11	0	1	0	—		—		12	0
CR Belouizdad	Total		81	3	1	0	30	1	0	0	112	4
Dynamo Makhachkala	2024–25	Russian Premier League	22	2	4	0	—		—		26	2
Dynamo Makhachkala	2025–26	Russian Premier League	28	1	7	1	—		2 (Note: Appearances in relegation play-offs)	1	37	3
Dynamo Makhachkala	2026–27	Russian Premier League	13	1	1	0	—		—		14	1
Dynamo Makhachkala	Total		63	4	12	1	0	0	2	1	77	6
Career total			144	7	13	1	30	1	2	1	189	10

=== International ===
As of match played 4 February 2023

Appearances and goals by national team and year
National team	Year	Apps	Goals
Algeria	2021	4	0
Algeria	2023	6	0
Total		10	0

== Honours ==
CR Belouizdad

- Algerian Ligue Professionnelle 1: 2020–21, 2021–22, 2022–23
- Algerian Cup: 2023–24
- Algerian Super Cup: 2019

Algeria

- FIFA Arab Cup: 2021
