= David Volk =

Russian footballer

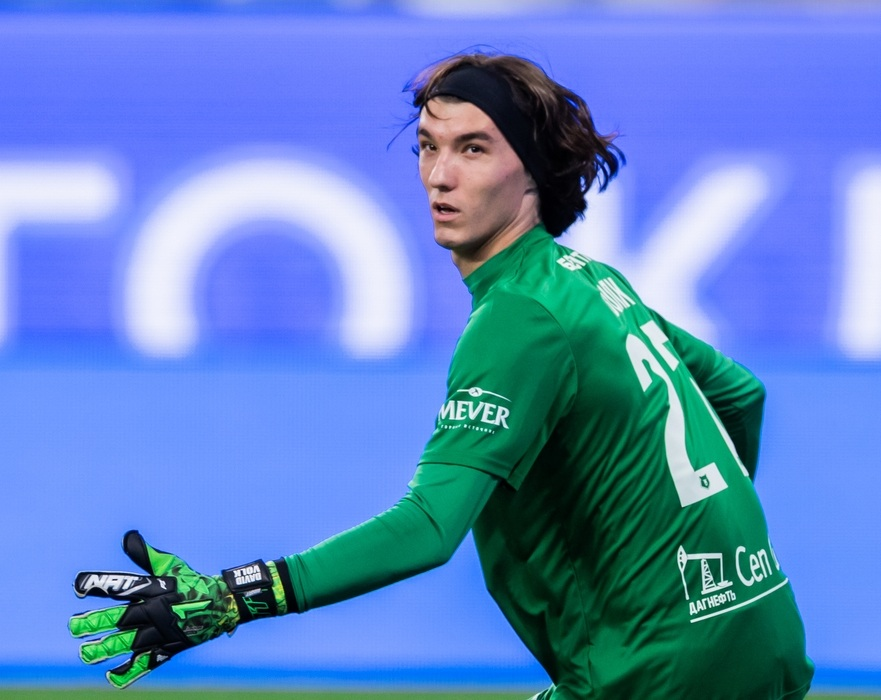
- Volk with Dynamo Makhachkala in 2025

Personal information
- Full name: David Vitalyevich Volk
- Date of birth: 11 April 2001 (age 25)
- Place of birth: Kazan, Russia
- Height: 1.92 m (6 ft 4 in)
- Position: Goalkeeper

Team information
- Current team: Dynamo Makhachkala
- Number: 1

Youth career
- –2017: Rubin Kazan
- 2017–2018: Neftekhimik Nizhnekamsk
- 2019: Rubin Kazan

Senior career*
Years	Team	Apps	(Gls)
2020–2022	Baltika Kaliningrad	2	(0)
2021–2022	→ Baltika-BFU Kaliningrad	11	(0)
2023–	Dynamo Makhachkala	58	(0)

International career^{‡}
2016	Russia U-16	2	(0)
- * Club domestic league appearances and goals as of 13 September 2026 ‡ National team caps and goals as of 20 August 2016

David Vitalyevich Volk (Russian: Дави́д Вита́льевич Во́лк; born 11 April 2001) is a Russian football player who plays as a goalkeeper for Dynamo Makhachkala.

== Club career ==
Volk made his debut in the Russian Football National League for Baltika Kaliningrad on 7 November 2020 in a game against Alania Vladikavkaz.

He made his Russian Premier League debut for Dynamo Makhachkala on 21 July 2024 in a game against Khimki.

== Career statistics ==
As of match played 13 September 2026

Club	Season	League			Cup		Total	
Club	Season	Division	Apps	Goals	Apps	Goals	Apps	Goals
Rubin Kazan	2019–20	Russian Premier League	0	0	0	0	0	0
Baltika Kaliningrad	2020–21	Russian First League	2	0	—		2	0
Baltika Kaliningrad	2021–22	Russian First League	0	0	0	0	0	0
Baltika Kaliningrad	2022–23	Russian First League	0	0	0	0	0	0
Baltika Kaliningrad	Total		2	0	0	0	2	0
Baltika-BFU Kaliningrad	2021–22	Russian Second League	11	0	—		11	0
Baltika-BFU Kaliningrad	2022–23	Russian Second League	0	0	—		0	0
Baltika-BFU Kaliningrad	Total		11	0	0	0	11	0
Dynamo Makhachkala	2022–23	Russian First League	0	0	—		0	0
Dynamo Makhachkala	2023–24	Russian First League	22	0	0	0	22	0
Dynamo Makhachkala	2024–25	Russian Premier League	20	0	3	0	23	0
Dynamo Makhachkala	2025–26	Russian Premier League	15	0	6	0	21	0
Dynamo Makhachkala	2026–27	Russian Premier League	1	0	3	0	4	0
Dynamo Makhachkala	Total		58	0	12	0	70	0
Career total			71	0	12	0	83	0
