= Hlushko =

Hlushko (Ukrainian: Глушко) is a Ukrainian surname, that may refer to:

== People ==
- Todd Hlushko (born 1970), a Canadian former professional ice hockey player
- Valentyn Hlushko (1908-1989), a Ukrainian Soviet engineer
- Yurii Hlushko-Mova (1882-1942), a Ukrainian public and political figure

== See also ==
- Halushko (Ukrainian: Галушко)
