= Soslan Kagermazov =

Russian footballer

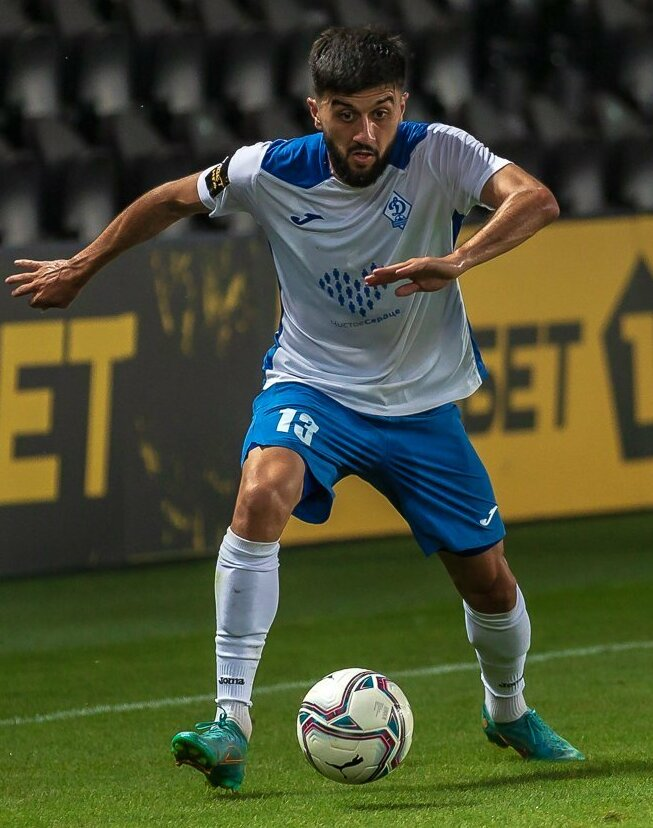
- Kagermazov with Dynamo Makhachkala in 2022

Personal information
- Full name: Soslan Ruslanovich Kagermazov
- Date of birth: 20 August 1996 (age 30)
- Place of birth: Kamennomost, Karachay-Cherkessia, Russia
- Height: 1.87 m (6 ft 2 in)
- Positions: Right midfielder; right-back

Team information
- Current team: Dynamo Makhachkala
- Number: 13

Youth career
- 2014: Progress Timashyovsk
- 2014–2016: Kuban Krasnodar

Senior career*
Years	Team	Apps	(Gls)
2016	Sochi	11	(0)
2017	Afips Afipsky	14	(1)
2017–2018	Shinnik Yaroslavl	15	(0)
2018–2019	Fakel Voronezh	23	(0)
2019–2020	Noah	24	(0)
2021	Noah Jūrmala/Lokomotiv Daugavpils	0	(0)
2021–	Dynamo Makhachkala	140	(6)
- * Club domestic league appearances and goals as of 17 October 2026

Soslan Ruslanovich Kagermazov (Russian: Сослан Русланович Кагермазов; born 20 August 1996) is a Russian football player who plays as a right midfielder and also right-back for Dynamo Makhachkala.

== Club career ==
Kagermazov made his debut in the Russian Professional Football League for Sochi on 29 July 2016 in a game against Krasnodar-2.

He made his Russian Football National League debut for Shinnik Yaroslavl on 26 July 2017 in a game against Kuban Krasnodar.

Kagermazov made his Russian Premier League debut for Dynamo Makhachkala on 21 July 2024 in a game against Khimki.

== Career statistics ==
As of match played 29 October 2026

Appearances and goals by club, season and competition
Club	Season	League			Cup		Europe		Other		Total	
Club	Season	Division	Apps	Goals	Apps	Goals	Apps	Goals	Apps	Goals	Apps	Goals
Sochi	2016–17	Russian Second League	11	0	1	0	—		—		12	0
Afips Afipsky	2016–17	Russian Second League	14	1	—		—		—		14	1
Shinnik Yaroslavl	2017–18	Russian First League	15	0	3	1	—		4 (Note: Appearances in the FNL Cup)	0	22	1
Fakel Voronezh	2018–19	Russian First League	23	0	1	0	—		4	0	28	0
Noah	2019–20	Armenian Premier League	22	0	4	0	—		—		26	0
Noah	2020–21	Armenian Premier League	2	0	—		1 (Note: Appearance in the UEFA Europa League)	0	0	0	3	0
Noah	Total		24	0	4	0	1	0	0	0	29	0
Noah Jūrmala	2021	Latvian Higher League	—		—		—		—		0	0
Dynamo Makhachkala	2021–22	Russian Second League	30	1	1	0	—		—		31	1
Dynamo Makhachkala	2022–23	Russian First League	29	1	2	0	—		—		31	1
Dynamo Makhachkala	2023–24	Russian First League	34	3	0	0	—		—		34	3
Dynamo Makhachkala	2024–25	Russian Premier League	24	1	6	0	—		—		30	1
Dynamo Makhachkala	2025–26	Russian Premier League	18	0	7	0	—		—		25	0
Dynamo Makhachkala	2026–27	Russian Premier League	5	0	5	0	—		—		10	0
Dynamo Makhachkala	Total		140	6	21	0	0	0	0	0	161	6
Career total			227	7	30	1	1	0	8	0	266	8

== Honours ==
Noah

- Armenian Cup: 2019–20
