= Zalimkhan Yusupov (footballer) =

Russian footballer

Personal information
- Full name: Zalimkhan Rashidovich Yusupov
- Date of birth: 27 January 1998 (age 28)
- Place of birth: Kayakent, Dagestan, Russia
- Height: 1.74 m (5 ft 9 in)
- Position: Midfielder

Team information
- Current team: Ufa
- Number: 22

Youth career
- 2009–2012: Olimpia Volgograd
- 2012–2017: Anzhi Makhachkala

Senior career*
Years	Team	Apps	(Gls)
2018	Anzhi-2 Makhachkala	12	(0)
2018	Legion-Dynamo Makhachkala	2	(0)
2019	Legion-Dynamo Makhachkala	22	(0)
2020–2021	Makhachkala	29	(3)
2021–2024	Dynamo Makhachkala	106	(11)
2025	Chernomorets Novorossiysk	10	(1)
2025–	Ufa	28	(4)
- * Club domestic league appearances and goals as of 16 May 2026

Zalimkhan Rashidovich Yusupov (Russian: Залимхан Рашидович Юсупов; born 27 January 1998) is a Russian football player who plays as a midfielder for Ufa.

== Club career ==
Yusupov made his debut in the Russian First League for Dynamo Makhachkala on 18 July 2022 in a game against Alania Vladikavkaz.

He made his Russian Premier League debut for Dynamo Makhachkala on 28 July 2024 in a game against Krasnodar.

== Career statistics ==
As of match played 7 December 2024

Appearances and goals by club, season and competition
Club	Season	League			Cup		Europe		Other		Total	
Club	Season	Division	Apps	Goals	Apps	Goals	Apps	Goals	Apps	Goals	Apps	Goals
Anzhi-2 Makhachkala	2017–18	Russian Second League	12	0	—		—		—		12	0
Legion-Dynamo Makhachkala	2018–19	Russian Second League	12	0	0	0	—		—		12	0
Legion-Dynamo Makhachkala	2019–20	Russian Second League	12	0	2	0	—		—		14	0
Legion-Dynamo Makhachkala	Total		24	0	2	0	—		—		26	0
Makhachkala	2019–20	Russian Second League	1	0	—		—		—		1	0
Makhachkala	2020–21	Russian Second League	28	3	1	0	—		—		29	3
Makhachkala	Total		29	3	1	0	—		—		30	3
Dynamo Makhachkala	2021–22	Russian Second League	31	5	1	0	—		—		32	5
Dynamo Makhachkala	2022–23	Russian First League	32	4	2	0	—		—		34	4
Dynamo Makhachkala	2023–24	Russian First League	31	2	0	0	—		—		31	2
Dynamo Makhachkala	2024–25	Russian Premier League	12	0	6	0	—		—		18	0
Dynamo Makhachkala	Total		106	11	9	0	—		—		115	11
Career total			171	14	12	0	0	0	0	0	183	14
