= FC Pobeda Khasavyurt =

Pobeda Khasavyurt
- Full name: Football Club Pobeda Khasavyurt
- Founded: 2022
- Ground: A.S. Murtazaliyev Stadium
- Capacity: 750
- Chairman: Absalutdin Agaragimov
- Manager: Levan Gvazava
- League: Russian Second League; Division B Group 1
- 2026: 4th
- Website: fc-pobeda.ru
Home colours	Away colours

FC Pobeda Khasavyurt (Russian: ФК «Победа» Хасавюрт) is a Russian football club based in Khasavyurt.

It started playing on the amateur level in 2022.

For the 2023–24 season, the club was admitted to the newly organized fourth-tier Russian Second League Division B.

== Current squad ==
As of 11 September 2026, according to the Second League website.

Note: Flags indicate national team as defined under FIFA eligibility rules; some limited exceptions apply. Players may hold more than one non-FIFA nationality.

No.	Pos.	Nation	Player
1	GK	RUS	Vladislav Kucheyko
3	DF	RUS	Akhmed Dzhabrailov
4	DF	RUS	Imamutdin Dzhamalavov
5	DF	RUS	Amin Sulebanov
6	DF	RUS	David Tsallagov
7	FW	RUS	Rashid Salimov
8	MF	RUS	Kurban Kurbanov
9	FW	RUS	Islam Vagabov
10	MF	RUS	Temirkhan Bitarov
11	MF	RUS	Labazan Labazanov
12	DF	RUS	Mukhammad Ibragimov
16	GK	RUS	Alimsultan Sultanaliyev
17	FW	RUS	Magomed Nasibov
19	MF	RUS	Samad Kurbanov

No.	Pos.	Nation	Player
20	MF	RUS	Sergey Kapanzhi
22	MF	RUS	Akhmed Ismailov
24	GK	RUS	Sultan Magomedov
25	MF	RUS	Maksim Azarenkov
29	FW	RUS	Artur Avagumyan
32	DF	RUS	Ilyas Gaibov
35	GK	RUS	Ulluby Murzayev
47	MF	RUS	Ibragim Umarov
53	FW	RUS	Shamil Gadzhiyev (on loan from Dynamo Makhachkala)
63	DF	RUS	Ruslan Salimov
74	FW	RUS	Rakhim Saytiyev
77	MF	RUS	Bolachi Gamzatov
93	DF	RUS	Mukhammad Televov
