= Idar Shumakhov =

Russian footballer

Personal information
- Full name: Idar Arturovich Shumakhov
- Date of birth: 5 June 1999 (age 27)
- Place of birth: Nalchik, Russia
- Height: 1.85 m (6 ft 1 in)
- Position: Centre-back

Team information
- Current team: Dynamo Makhachkala
- Number: 4

Youth career
- 2019: SDYuSShOR Nalchik

Senior career*
Years	Team	Apps	(Gls)
2019–2020	Inter Cherkessk	4	(0)
2020–2021	Mashuk-KMV Pyatigorsk	30	(0)
2021–2022	Spartak Nalchik	27	(1)
2022–	Dynamo Makhachkala	112	(3)
- * Club domestic league appearances and goals as of 13 March 2026

Idar Arturovich Shumakhov (Russian: Идар Артурович Шумахов; born 5 June 1999) is a Russian football player who plays as a centre-back for Dynamo Makhachkala.

== Career ==
Shumakhov made his debut in the Russian Premier League for Dynamo Makhachkala on 21 July 2024 in a game against Khimki, that was Dynamo's first ever game in the top tier. He scored on his debut, giving Dynamo their first-ever top tier points in a 1–1 draw.

== Career statistics ==
As of match played 13 March 2026

Appearances and goals by club, season and competition
Club	Season	League			Cup		Total	
Club	Season	Division	Apps	Goals	Apps	Goals	Apps	Goals
Inter Cherkessk	2019–20	Russian Second League	4	0	—		4	0
Mashuk-KMV Pyatigorsk	2020–21	Russian Second League	30	0	4	1	34	1
Spartak Nalchik	2021–22	Russian Second League	27	1	2	0	29	1
Dynamo Makhachkala	2022–23	Russian First League	33	2	3	1	36	3
Dynamo Makhachkala	2023–24	Russian First League	31	0	0	0	31	0
Dynamo Makhachkala	2024–25	Russian Premier League	29	1	5	0	34	1
Dynamo Makhachkala	2025–26	Russian Premier League	19	0	6	0	25	0
Dynamo Makhachkala	Total		112	3	14	1	126	4
Career total			173	4	20	2	193	6
