= FC Kosmos Dolgoprudny =

Association football club in Russia

- Founded: 2022; 4 years ago
- Ground: Salyut Stadium
- Capacity: 6,000
- Chairman: Vladimir Kalbeko
- Manager: Emin Ağayev
- League: Russian Second League, Division B, Group 2
- 2026: 6th
- Website: cosmosfc.ru

FC Kosmos Dolgoprudny (Russian: ФК «Космос» Долгопрудный) is a Russian professional association football club based in Dolgoprudny. It made its debut in the third-highest Russian Second League in the 2022–23 season.

== History ==
A club with the same name played professionally from 1991 to 1998 before moving to a different city. After Kosmos moved, a new club was organized in Dolgoprudny called FSC Dolgoprudny. That club eventually was promoted to the second-tier Russian Football National League as FC Olimp-Dolgoprudny for the 2021–22 season, and a farm club called FC Olimp-Dolgoprudny-2 was registered for the third tier. Following the season, Olimp-Dolgoprudny was not licensed due to financial issues, and a resurrected Kosmos, created on the base of FC Olimp-Dolgoprudny-2, was licensed for the Russian Second League.

== Current squad ==
As of 11 September 2026, according to the Second League website.

Note: Flags indicate national team as defined under FIFA eligibility rules; some limited exceptions apply. Players may hold more than one non-FIFA nationality.

No.	Pos.	Nation	Player
1	GK	RUS	Roman Mikheyev
4	DF	RUS	Vanik Sukiasyan
5	MF	RUS	Aleksandr Kormushin
7	FW	RUS	Mikhail Naumov
8	MF	RUS	Konstantin Kurzakov
9	FW	RUS	Artyom Arutyunov
10	FW	RUS	Kirill Babayev
13	DF	RUS	Maksim Abramov
14	FW	RUS	Vladislav Martynovchenko
18	MF	RUS	Albert Kayumov (on loan from Ufa)
20	MF	RUS	Yaroslav Bish
24	FW	RUS	Arseny Mitryukov
25	DF	RUS	Stepan Kulikov
37	MF	RUS	Anton Volkov
41	MF	RUS	Yegor Kucherov

No.	Pos.	Nation	Player
44	FW	RUS	Zakhar Gvozdev
51	GK	RUS	Gleb Gusev
59	DF	RUS	Zhan Naibov
61	MF	RUS	Danila Matvevnin
63	DF	RUS	Nikita Sharkov
69	DF	RUS	Roman Syrykov
70	MF	RUS	Valery Aslanov
71	DF	RUS	Vladimir Shishnin
72	GK	RUS	Dmitry Pivunchikov
76	DF	RUS	Daniil Yakunchikov
77	DF	RUS	Nikita Gavrilin
85	DF	RUS	Elvin Allakhverdiyev
88	MF	RUS	Abdulkadir Kurbanaliyev
98	FW	RUS	Oleg Trofimov
99	GK	RUS	Nikhad Gasanov

== See also ==
FC Saturn-2 Moscow Region
