= Nikita Glushkov (footballer, born 1999) =

Russian footballer

Personal information
- Full name: Nikita Sergeyevich Glushkov
- Date of birth: 19 March 1999 (age 27)
- Height: 1.75 m (5 ft 9 in)
- Positions: Attacking midfielder; central midfielder

Team information
- Current team: Dynamo Makhachkala
- Number: 47

Youth career
- 2010: DYuSSh Vsevlolzhsk
- 2010–2017: SShOR Zenit St. Petersburg
- 2018: Lokomotiv Moscow

Senior career*
Years	Team	Apps	(Gls)
2018–2019	Kazanka Moscow	21	(2)
2019–2021	Chayka Peschanokopskoye	33	(1)
2021–	Dynamo Makhachkala	162	(11)

International career^{‡}
2017	Russia U-18	5	(1)
2018	Russia U-20	5	(1)
- * Club domestic league appearances and goals as of 22 November 2026 ‡ National team caps and goals as of 8 August 2018

Nikita Sergeyevich Glushkov (Russian: Ники́та Серге́евич Глушко́в; born 19 March 1999) is a Russian football player who plays as an attacking midfielder or a central midfielder for Dynamo Makhachkala. He has also played as a winger.

== Club career ==
Glushkov made his debut in the Russian Professional Football League for Kazanka Moscow on 18 July 2018 in a game against Leningradets Leningrad Oblast.

He made his Russian Football National League debut for Chayka Peschanokopskoye on 13 July 2019 in a game against Fakel Voronezh.

Glushkov made his Russian Premier League debut for Dynamo Makhachkala on 21 July 2024 in a game against Khimki.

== Career statistics ==
As of match played 22 November 2026

Appearances and goals by club, season and competition
Club	Season	League			Cup		Other		Total	
Club	Season	Division	Apps	Goals	Apps	Goals	Apps	Goals	Apps	Goals
Kazanka Moscow	2018–19	Russian Second League	21	2	–		–		21	2
Chayka	2019–20	Russian First League	9	0	0	0	–		9	0
Chayka	2020–21	Russian First League	24	1	1	0	–		25	1
Chayka	2021–22	Russian Second League	0	0	0	0	–		0	0
Chayka	Total		33	1	1	0	0	0	34	1
Dynamo Makhachkala	2021–22	Russian Second League	24	4	–		–		24	4
Dynamo Makhachkala	2022–23	Russian First League	32	2	2	0	–		34	2
Dynamo Makhachkala	2023–24	Russian First League	34	3	0	0	–		34	3
Dynamo Makhachkala	2024–25	Russian Premier League	27	0	5	0	–		32	0
Dynamo Makhachkala	2025–26	Russian Premier League	30	0	8	0	2 (Note: Appearances in relegation play-offs)	0	40	0
Dynamo Makhachkala	2026–27	Russian Premier League	15	2	2	0	–		17	2
Dynamo Makhachkala	Total		162	11	17	0	2	0	181	11
Career total			216	14	18	0	2	0	236	14
