= FC Dynamo-2 Makhachkala =

Dynamo-2 Makhachkala
- Full name: Football Club Dynamo-2 Makhachkala
- Founded: 2023; 3 years ago
- Ground: Trud Stadium; Makhachkala; Rusia
- Capacity: 15,200
- Chairman: Gadzhi Gadzhiyev
- Manager: Nika Potskhverashvili
- League: Russian Second League; Division B Group 1
- 2026: 15th
- Website: dinamo-mx.ru

FC Dynamo-2 Makhachkala (Russian: ФК Динамо-2 Махачкала) is a Russian football club based in Makhachkala. It is the farm club for FC Dynamo Makhachkala.

For the 2023–24 season, the club was admitted to the newly organized fourth-tier Russian Second League Division B.

== Current squad ==
As of 11 September 2026, according to the Second League website.

Note: Flags indicate national team as defined under FIFA eligibility rules; some limited exceptions apply. Players may hold more than one non-FIFA nationality.

No.	Pos.	Nation	Player
1	GK	RUS	Umakhan Gamzalayev
3	DF	RUS	Islam Shamkhalov
4	DF	RUS	Vagab Budaykhanov
5	DF	RUS	Niyaz Gyulmagomedov
6	MF	RUS	Magomed-Said Khidirov
7	DF	RUS	Akhmed Suleymanov
8	MF	RUS	Nikita Voronin
11	FW	RUS	Ramazan Magomedov
12	DF	RUS	Islam Mikhteyev
14	DF	RUS	Idar Shumakhov
17	FW	RUS	Khabib Agalarov
18	MF	RUS	Andrey Lyashov
20	MF	RUS	Muslim Abakarov
21	MF	RUS	Abdulpasha Dzhabrailov
23	FW	RUS	Gamid Shamkhalov
26	DF	RUS	Elifkhan Agabekov
28	MF	RUS	Amin Gokgozov
33	GK	RUS	Nikita Karabashev

No.	Pos.	Nation	Player
35	GK	RUS	Gadzhi Ibragimov
36	GK	RUS	Zaynudin Zaynudinov
43	DF	RUS	Ilyas Akhmedov
44	DF	RUS	Rizvan Ilyasov
55	DF	RUS	Timur Datsiyev
66	DF	RUS	Ali Gulin
70	MF	RUS	Abdulla Ashurov
71	MF	RUS	Musa Manuchev
72	DF	RUS	Aleksandr Sandrachuk
74	MF	RUS	Umar Magomedov
75	DF	RUS	Arsen Shikhaliyev
79	MF	RUS	Khanmurza Khanmurzayev
80	MF	RUS	Khizri Khidiyev
88	GK	RUS	Bogatyr Razhbudinov
91	FW	RUS	Ramazan Aliyev
93	DF	RUS	Said Sedredinov
95	DF	RUS	Islam Sultanov
97	MF	RUS	Kamil Tashtemirov
