= 2023 Russian Second League Division B =

Russian Second League Division B
- Season: 2023
- Dates: 16 July 2023 – 25 November 2023
- Promoted: Mashuk-KMV Pyatigorsk; Khimik Dzerzhinsk; Kaluga; Torpedo Miass
- Relegated: SKA Rostov-on-Don; Zorkiy Krasnogorsk; Torpedo-2; Krasnoye Znamya Noginsk; Peresvet Domodedovo; Khimik-Avgust Vurnary

The 2023 Russian Second League Division B was the first season of Russia's fourth-tier football league. The season began on 16 July 2023 and ended on 25 November 2023.

== Overview ==
Before the season, the Russian Second League was reorganized and split into two tiers - third-tier Russian Second League Division A and fourth-tier Russian Second League Division B. Division B also switched to the spring-to-autumn, March-to-November schedule. 2023 was a transitional half-year season. The teams that finished in 6th place or below in their groups in the 2022–23 Russian Second League were included into Division B.

The fourth tier of Russian football was semi-professional before from 1994 to 1997 as Russian Third League, and since then the fourth tier was taken by the Russian Amateur Football League until 2023.

Division B was split into 4 groups, mostly based on geographical location. At the end of the year, four winners of their groups were promoted into the Division A Second Stage Silver Group. Four bottom teams from the Division A First Stage Silver Group were relegated to 2024 Division B.

81 clubs were originally licensed for Division B. FC Zenit-Izhevsk dropped out of the division after receiving the license. FC Balashikha and FC Yadro Saint Petersburg did not receive the license, FC Yessentuki was excluded from the league during the 2022–23 season. FC Kuban-Holding Pavlovskaya, which was eligible for Division A, decided to enter Division B; FC Metallurg Lipetsk took their Division A spot.

New clubs entering the league were FC Akron-2 Tolyatti, FC Rubin-2 Kazan, FC Dynamo-2 Makhachkala (reserve teams of Russian Premier League and Russian First League clubs), SC Astrakhan, FC Dynamo Kirov, FC Irkutsk, FC Kompozit Pavlovsky Posad, FC Pobeda Khasavyurt, FC Uralets-TS Nizhny Tagil (promoted from the Russian Amateur Football League), FC Rubin Yalta and FC Sevastopol (from the Crimean Premier League).

== Group 1 ==
Group 1 was initially split into two subgroups 1.1 and 1.2 of 7 teams each; each team in subgroup played each other twice from 16 July to 14 October. New subgroups were organized then, 1A (which includes top 3 teams from 1.1 and 1.2) and 1B (which includes the remaining 8 teams). Only results between the teams that qualified for a particular second-stage subgroup counted for the second-stage standings (i.e., only results of the 6 games played between top 3 teams of subgroup 1.1 were included in the standings of subgroup 1A and so on). Then, from October to November, the teams in these new subgroups played the teams that were in a different subgroup in the first stage, twice (for 6 additional games in 1A and 8 additional games in 1B for each team). The winner of subgroup 1A was promoted to Division A Silver Group. The bottom two teams of subgroup 1B were relegated from Division B.

=== First stage ===
==== Subgroup 1.1 ====
Pos	Team	Pld	W	D	L	GF	GA	GD	Pts	Qualification
1	Kuban-Holding Pavlovskaya	12	8	0	4	20	8	+12	24	Qualification for the Second Stage Subgroup 1A
2	Druzhba Maykop	12	7	2	3	8	9	−1	23	Qualification for the Second Stage Subgroup 1A
3	Rubin Yalta	12	6	3	3	19	12	+7	21	Qualification for the Second Stage Subgroup 1A
4	Sevastopol	12	6	2	4	11	13	−2	20	Qualification for the Second Stage Subgroup 1B
5	Biolog-Novokubansk	12	4	3	5	14	12	+2	15	Qualification for the Second Stage Subgroup 1B
6	SKA Rostov-on-Don	12	4	1	7	10	14	−4	13	Qualification for the Second Stage Subgroup 1B
7	Dynamo Stavropol	12	1	1	10	3	17	−14	4	Qualification for the Second Stage Subgroup 1B

Source: Second League Division B (in Russian), Soccerway

==== Subgroup 1.2 ====
Pos	Team	Pld	W	D	L	GF	GA	GD	Pts	Qualification or relegation
1	Mashuk-KMV Pyatigorsk	12	9	1	2	21	9	+12	28	Qualification for the Second Stage Subgroup 1A
2	Legion Makhachkala	12	6	5	1	20	11	+9	23	Qualification for the Second Stage Subgroup 1A
3	Astrakhan	12	5	3	4	21	15	+6	18	Qualification for the Second Stage Subgroup 1A
4	Spartak Nalchik	12	5	2	5	16	16	0	17	Qualification for the Second Stage Subgroup 1B
5	Dynamo-2 Makhachkala	12	2	5	5	10	13	−3	11	Qualification for the Second Stage Subgroup 1B
6	Alania-2 Vladikavkaz	12	3	2	7	17	31	−14	11	Qualification for the Second Stage Subgroup 1B
7	Pobeda Khasavyurt	12	2	2	8	13	23	−10	8	Qualification for the Second Stage Subgroup 1B

Source: Second League Division B (in Russian), Soccerway

=== Second stage ===
==== Subgroup 1A ====
Pos	Team	Pld	W	D	L	GF	GA	GD	Pts	Qualification
1	Mashuk-KMV Pyatigorsk	10	6	3	1	15	6	+9	21	Promotion to the Division A Second Stage Silver Group
2	Rubin Yalta	10	4	3	3	9	7	+2	15	
3	Kuban-Holding Pavlovskaya	10	4	3	3	11	6	+5	15	
4	Druzhba Maykop	10	4	2	4	8	14	−6	14	
5	Astrakhan	10	1	5	4	10	14	−4	8	
6	Legion Makhachkala	10	1	4	5	8	14	−6	7	

Source: Second League Division B (in Russian), Soccerway

===== Top goalscorers =====
Rank	Player	Club	Goals
1	Gadzhimurad Abdullayev	Legion Makhachkala	8
2	Aleksandr Butenko	Mashuk-KMV Pyatigorsk	7
2	Mikhail Bersnev	Astrakhan	7
2	Ruslan Suanov	Mashuk-KMV Pyatigorsk	7
2	Patcho	Astrakhan	7

==== Subgroup 1B ====
Pos	Team	Pld	W	D	L	GF	GA	GD	Pts	Qualification
1	Sevastopol	14	9	4	1	21	6	+15	31	
2	SKA Rostov-on-Don (Note: On 25 January 2024, the owner of SKA Rostov-on-Don announced the club's move to the Media Football League)	14	9	1	4	21	15	+6	28	Moved to the Media Football League
3	Spartak Nalchik	14	8	2	4	22	15	+7	26	
4	Biolog-Novokubansk	14	5	3	6	16	18	−2	18	
5	Dynamo-2 Makhachkala	14	3	6	5	17	18	−1	15	
6	Alania-2 Vladikavkaz	14	4	3	7	20	25	−5	15	
7	Pobeda Khasavyurt (Note: On 19 February 2024, Pobeda Khasavyurt was licensed for the 2024 season of the Second League Division B.)	14	3	4	7	17	27	−10	13	
8	Dynamo Stavropol (Note: On 16 February 2024, Dynamo Stavropol was licensed for the 2024 season of the Second League Division B.)	14	2	3	9	9	19	−10	9	

Source: Second League Division B (in Russian), Soccerway

===== Top goalscorers =====
Rank	Player	Club	Goals
1	Zalimkhan Maysultanov	Pobeda Khasavyurt	9
2	Pavel Solomatin	SKA Rostov-on-Don	8
2	Alan Khachirov	Spartak Nalchik	8
4	Grigory Minosyan	Biolog-Novokubansk	7

== Group 2 ==
Group 2 included 18 teams that played each other once, from 22 July to 12 November, with the host team in each pair determined by the league. The group winner was promoted to the Division A Second Stage Silver Group, the bottom two teams were relegated from Division B.

Pos	Team	Pld	W	D	L	GF	GA	GD	Pts	Promotion or relegation
1	Khimik Dzerzhinsk	17	14	2	1	33	15	+18	44	Promotion to the Division A Second Stage Silver Group
2	Zenit-2 Saint Petersburg	17	11	4	2	34	11	+23	37	
3	Irkutsk	17	11	4	2	23	9	+14	37	
4	Dynamo-2 Moscow	17	9	3	5	30	23	+7	30	
5	Dynamo Kirov	17	9	2	6	27	19	+8	29	
6	Rodina-M Moscow	17	8	3	6	22	21	+1	27	
7	Zorkiy Krasnogorsk (Note: Zorkiy Krasnogorsk was voluntarily relegated for the 2024 season)	17	7	4	6	16	17	−1	25	Relegation to the Russian Amateur Football League
8	Baltika-BFU Kaliningrad	17	7	4	6	23	21	+2	25	
9	Dynamo Saint Petersburg	17	7	2	8	19	18	+1	23	
10	Dynamo Vologda	17	6	4	7	17	17	0	22	
11	Luki-Energiya Velikiye Luki	17	5	5	7	18	21	−3	20	
12	Zvezda Saint Petersburg	17	6	2	9	41	31	+10	20	
13	Znamya Truda Orekhovo-Zuyevo	17	5	5	7	20	25	−5	20	
14	Torpedo Vladimir	17	4	3	10	21	32	−11	15	
15	Yenisey-2 Krasnoyarsk	17	3	6	8	21	37	−16	15	
16	Tver	17	4	3	10	16	23	−7	15	
17	Elektron Veliky Novgorod (Note: On 29 February 2024, Elektron was licensed for the 2024 season of the Second League Division B.)	17	4	1	12	11	38	−27	13	
18	Torpedo-2	17	2	5	10	11	25	−14	11	Relegation to the Russian Amateur Football League

Source: Second League Division B (in Russian), Soccerway

=== Top goalscorers ===
Rank	Player	Club	Goals
1	Ilya Yurchenko	Dynamo Kirov	16
2	Igor Bugayenko	Zenit-2 St. Petersburg	11
3	Arsen Dzhioyev	Znamya Truda Orekhovo-Zuyevo	10
4	Aleksandr Chupayov	Dynamo-2 Moscow	9
4	Nikita Tankov	Dynamo St. Petersburg	9

== Group 3 ==
Group 3 included 18 teams that played each other once, from 21 July to 12 November, with the host team in each pair determined by the league. The group winner was promoted to the Division A Second Stage Silver Group, the bottom two teams were relegated from Division B.

Pos	Team	Pld	W	D	L	GF	GA	GD	Pts	Promotion or relegation
1	Kaluga	17	12	3	2	50	6	+44	39	Promotion to the Division A Second Stage Silver Group
2	Sakhalinets Moscow (Note: Sakhalinets Moscow dropped out of all competitions due to lack of sponsorship in January 2024.)	17	11	3	3	38	21	+17	36	Dissolved after the season
3	Spartak Tambov	17	10	3	4	26	22	+4	33	
4	Dynamo Vladivostok	17	10	0	7	30	21	+9	30	
5	Arsenal-2 Tula	17	8	6	3	24	16	+8	30	
6	Kompozit Pavlovsky Posad	17	8	5	4	28	20	+8	29	
7	Leon Saturn Ramenskoye	17	9	2	6	30	18	+12	29	
8	SKA-Khabarovsk-2	17	8	1	8	30	29	+1	25	
9	Zenit Penza	17	7	4	6	22	26	−4	25	
10	Kosmos Dolgoprudny	17	6	5	6	24	28	−4	23	
11	Sakhalin Yuzhno-Sakhalinsk	17	7	2	8	16	19	−3	23	
12	Kvant Obninsk	17	6	5	6	19	27	−8	23	
13	Krasnoye Znamya Noginsk (Note: Krasnoye Znamya Noginsk failed to pass licensing for the 2024 season of the Second League Division B.)	17	6	4	7	18	26	−8	22	Relegation to the Russian Amateur Football League
14	Khimki-M	17	6	1	10	20	28	−8	19	
15	Ryazan	17	4	3	10	24	27	−3	15	
16	Strogino Moscow	17	3	5	9	28	36	−8	14	
17	Kolomna (Note: On 26 February 2024, Kolomna was licensed for the 2024 season of Second League Division B.)	17	1	5	11	17	41	−24	8	
18	Peresvet Domodedovo	17	2	1	14	21	54	−33	7	Relegation to the Russian Amateur Football League

Source: Second League Division B (in Russian), Soccerway

=== Top goalscorers ===
Rank	Player	Club	Goals
1	Dmitri Kamenshchikov	Kaluga	16
2	Nikolay Sukhanov	Kaluga	11
3	Renat Gaynullin	Sakhalinets Moscow	10
4	Timur Melekestsev	Leon Saturn Ramenskoye	8
4	Denis Beskorovayny	Krasnoye Znamya Noginsk	8
4	Nikita Nikiforov	Strogino Moscow	8

== Group 4 ==
Group 4 included 9 teams that played each other twice, home and away, from 16 July to 12 November. The group winner was promoted to the Division A Second Stage Silver Group, the bottom two teams were relegated from Division B.

Pos	Team	Pld	W	D	L	GF	GA	GD	Pts	Promotion or relegation
1	Torpedo Miass	16	11	3	2	33	12	+21	36	Promotion to the Division A Second Stage Silver Group
2	Khimik-Avgust Vurnary (Note: On 22 December 2023, Khimik-Avgust announced that the professional team will be abandoned, and only children's football academy will remain under the name.)	16	8	7	1	19	6	+13	31	Dissolved after the season
3	Rubin-2 Kazan	16	7	5	4	15	14	+1	26	
4	Nosta Novotroitsk	16	6	7	3	19	14	+5	25	
5	Ural-2 Yekaterinburg	16	5	6	5	20	20	0	21	
6	Uralets-TS Nizhny Tagil	16	4	6	6	8	12	−4	18	
7	Dynamo Barnaul	16	4	5	7	28	29	−1	17	
8	Orenburg-2 (Note: On 20 February 2024, Orenburg-2 was licensed for the 2024 season of the Second League Division B.)	16	3	6	7	14	24	−10	15	
9	Akron-2 Tolyatti (Note: On 16 February 2024, Akron-2 Tolyatti was licensed for the 2024 season of the Second League Division B.)	16	0	3	13	9	34	−25	3	

Source: Second League Division B (in Russian), Soccerway

=== Top goalscorers ===
Rank	Player	Club	Goals
1	Oleg Leonov	Nosta Novotroitsk	7
1	Vladimir Zavyalov	Dynamo Barnaul	7
3	Mark Akvazba	Torpedo Miass	6
4	Vladislav Shpitalny	Torpedo Miass	5
4	Mekhron Madaminov	Torpedo Miass	5
