= FC Dynamo Makhachkala =

Dynamo Makhachkala
- Full name: Football Club Dynamo Makhachkala
- Founded: 1927; 99 years ago
- Ground: Stadium Trud, Makhachkala; Anzhi Arena, Kaspiysk
- Capacity: 5,600; 26,500
- Chairman: Gadzhi Gadzhiyev
- Manager: Vadim Yevseyev
- League: Russian Premier League
- 2025–26: 14th of 16 (relegation play-offs)
- Website: https://dinamo-mx.ru
Home colours	Away colours

FC Dynamo Makhachkala (Russian: ФК Динамо Махачкала) is a Russian professional football club based in Makhachkala that plays in the Russian Premier League.

== History ==
In the 2006 season, Dynamo finished 16th in the Russian First Division. However, the club was denied the professional license and thus relegated to amateur level.

Colours are all white (home) or white shirt with broad blue stripe, blue shorts (away).

The club was founded in 1927 and debuted in the North Caucasus zone of the Soviet Group 3, finishing seventh of eight teams. Following this, Dynamo would not play in the Soviet League until 1958, when they entered Class B. In 1958–1960, the team was known as Temp. In 1967, Dynamo became the winners of Class B and were promoted to Class A, Group 2. After the reorganization of the league in 1971, Dynamo Makhachkala played in the Second League. They stayed at that level until 1990, when they were moved to Second League B. The best Dynamo's achievement in the league was the top finish in their zone and sixth position in the league finals in 1975.

Dynamo Makhachkala entered the Russian Second League in 1993, and after 1994 season they moved to the Third League. In 1996–1997, the team was known as Dynamo-Imamat. In 1998, following the reform of the league, Dynamo entered the Second Division and stayed there until winning in the South zone in 2003. Dynamo played in the First Division from 2004 to 2006.

Before the 2021–22 season, the team that previously played as FC Makhachkala was renamed to FC Dynamo Makhachkala. On 30 May 2022, Dynamo secured promotion to Russian First League.

On 20 May 2024, Dynamo secured promotion to the Russian Premier League for the first time in its history.

In the 2025–26 season, Dynamo qualified for relegation play-offs, they defeated Ural Yekaterinburg 3–0 on aggregate and remained in the Premier League.

Hazem Mastouri was selected to represent Tunisia at the 2026 FIFA World Cup.

== Current squad ==
As of 25 September 2026, according to the Russian Premier League website. Note: Flags indicate national team as defined under FIFA eligibility rules; some limited exceptions apply. Players may hold more than one non-FIFA nationality.

No.	Pos.	Nation	Player
1	GK	RUS	David Volk
4	DF	RUS	Idar Shumakhov
6	MF	RUS	Marat Apshatsev (on loan from Rubin Kazan)
8	MF	RUS	Vladimir Khubulov
9	FW	RUS	Razhab Magomedov
10	MF	IRI	Mohammad Javad Hosseinnejad
11	FW	ANG	Miro
13	DF	RUS	Soslan Kagermazov
14	MF	RUS	Daler Kuzyayev
16	MF	ALG	Houssem Mrezigue
19	MF	BLR	Kirill Zinovich
21	MF	RUS	Abdulpasha Dzhabrailov
23	DF	UZB	Makhmud Makhamadzhonov

No.	Pos.	Nation	Player
24	DF	COL	Andrés Alarcón
25	FW	RUS	Gamid Agalarov
28	FW	RUS	Serder Serderov
30	MF	RUS	Dmitri Aleksandrov (on loan from Dynamo Moscown)
33	GK	RUS	Nikita Karabashev
39	GK	RUS	Timur Magomedov
43	DF	RUS	Ilyas Akhmedov
47	MF	RUS	Nikita Glushkov
52	MF	RUS	Yegor Smelov
72	DF	RUS	Aleksandr Sandrachuk
77	MF	RUS	Temirkan Sundukov
88	MF	RUS	Daniil Lesovoy (on loan from Nizhny Novgorod)
99	DF	RUS	Mutalip Alibekov

=== Out on loan ===
Note: Flags indicate national team as defined under FIFA eligibility rules; some limited exceptions apply. Players may hold more than one non-FIFA nationality.

No.	Pos.	Nation	Player
—	MF	RUS	Shamil Gadzhiyev (at Pobeda Khasavyurt until 31 December 2026)
—	FW	RUS	Gadzhi Budunov (at Mashuk-KMV Pyatigorsk until 30 June 2027)

No.	Pos.	Nation	Player
—	FW	ALG	Diaa Eddine Mechid (at ES Ben Aknoun until 30 June 2027)
—	FW	RUS	Kirill Pomeshkin (at Mashuk-KMV Pyatigorsk until 31 December 2026)

== Notable players ==
Had international caps for their respective countries. Players whose name is listed in bold represented their countries while playing for Dynamo.

- (Algeria) Mohamed Azzi
- (Algeria) Houssem Eddine Mrezigue
- (Azerbaijan) Ibragim Gasanbekov
- (Azerbaijan) Narvik Sırxayev
- (Belarus) **Kirill Zinovich**
- (Estonia) Mark Švets
- (Georgia (country)) Jemal Tabidze
- (Iran) **Mohammad Javad Hosseinnejad**
- (Ivory Coast) Victorien Angban
- (Russia) Daler Kuzyayev
- (Russia) **Valentin Paltsev**
- (Serbia) Vladimir Kovačević
- (Uzbekistan) Ruslan Agalarov
- (Uzbekistan) **Makhmud Makhamadzhonov**
