= List of Russian football transfers summer 2025 =

This is a list of Russian football transfers in the 2025 summer transfer window by club. Only clubs of the 2025–26 Russian Premier League are included.

== Russian Premier League 2025–26 ==
=== Akhmat Grozny ===
In: Note: Flags indicate national team as defined under FIFA eligibility rules; some limited exceptions apply. Players may hold more than one non-FIFA nationality.

No.	Pos.	Nation	Player
9	FW	ARG	Braian Mansilla (from Orenburg)
10	MF	RUS	Rifat Zhemaletdinov (from CSKA Moscow)
13	FW	BFA	Mohamed Konaté (from (Saudi Arabia) Al-Riyadh)
17	MF	ANG	Egas Cacintura (from Dynamo Makhachkala)
22	DF	IRI	Mohammadmehdi Zare (from (Iran) Gol Gohar Sirjan)
37	MF	SEN	Papa Amady Gadio (from (Morocco) Union Touarga)
42	MF	ANG	Manuel Keliano (from (Portugal) Estrela da Amadora)
70	MF	RUS	Abakar Gadzhiyev (from Dynamo Makhachkala)
81	DF	RUS	Maksim Sidorov (from Orenburg)
90	DF	SEN	Ousmane Ndong (from (Iran) Gol Gohar Sirjan)
99	FW	MAR	Anas El Mahraoui (from (Morocco) COD Meknès)

Out: Note: Flags indicate national team as defined under FIFA eligibility rules; some limited exceptions apply. Players may hold more than one non-FIFA nationality.

No.	Pos.	Nation	Player
2	DF	RUS	Aleksandr Zhirov (to Chelyabinsk)
3	DF	RUS	Leo Goglichidze (to Rodina Moscow)
7	MF	KOS	Bernard Berisha (to (Albania) Dinamo City)
9	FW	PAR	Rodrigo Ruiz Díaz (to (Paraguay) 2 de Mayo)
13	MF	RUS	Minkail Matsuyev (to Saturn Ramenskoye)
18	MF	RUS	Vladislav Kamilov (to Orenburg)
19	FW	ARG	Mauro Luna Diale (to (Argentina) Platense)
23	MF	RUS	Anton Shvets (to Rubin Kazan)
24	MF	MNE	Zaim Divanović (to (Montenegro) Petrovac)
28	MF	RUS	Daniil Zorin (end of loan from Spartak Moscow)
47	MF	RUS	Daniil Utkin (end of loan from Rostov)
59	MF	RUS	Yevgeni Kharin (to Ural Yekaterinburg)
74	MF	RUS	Daniil Turishchev (to Baltika-2 Kaliningrad)
95	DF	RUS	Arsen Adamov (end of loan from Zenit St. Petersburg)
—	GK	RUS	Rizvan Tashayev (to Avangard Kursk, previously on loan to Amkar Perm)
—	DF	BIH	Jasmin Čeliković (to (Slovenia) Koper, previously on loan to (Greece) Panetolikos)
—	FW	BUL	Svetoslav Kovachev (to (Bulgaria) Arda Kardzhali, previously on loan)

=== Akron Tolyatti ===
In: Note: Flags indicate national team as defined under FIFA eligibility rules; some limited exceptions apply. Players may hold more than one non-FIFA nationality.

No.	Pos.	Nation	Player
2	DF	BOL	Yomar Rocha (from (Bolivia) Bolívar)
7	MF	ARM	Edgar Sevikyan (on loan from (Hungary) Ferencváros)
8	MF	RUS	Konstantin Maradishvili (from Lokomotiv Moscow)
21	DF	BOL	Roberto Fernández (from (Bolivia) Bolívar, previously on loan)
23	MF	CRO	Kristijan Bistrović (from CSKA Moscow)
80	MF	RUS	Khetag Khosonov (from Torpedo Moscow)
81	MF	RUS	Nikita Bazilevsky (from Zenit-2 St. Petersburg)
86	DF	RUS	Ilya Agapov (on loan from CSKA Moscow)
88	GK	RUS	Vitali Gudiyev (from Fakel Voronezh)
96	GK	RUS	Vladislav Postrigan (from own academy)

Out: Note: Flags indicate national team as defined under FIFA eligibility rules; some limited exceptions apply. Players may hold more than one non-FIFA nationality.

No.	Pos.	Nation	Player
1	GK	RUS	Sergey Volkov (on loan to Rodina Moscow)
4	DF	BRA	Paulo Vitor (on loan to (Portugal) AVS, previously on loan to (Portugal) Vitória de Guimarães)
7	FW	RUS	Kirill Danilin (on loan to Torpedo Moscow)
14	FW	RUS	Vladimir Khubulov (end of loan from Krylia Sovetov Samara)
20	MF	RUS	Artur Galoyan (to Torpedo Moscow)
25	MF	UZB	Sherzod Esanov
37	DF	RUS	Vladislav Konovalov (to Kaluga)
65	MF	RUS	Vladimir Moskvichyov (end of loan from Torpedo Moscow)
80	DF	RUS	Vyacheslav Bardybakhin (on loan to Rotor Volgograd)
97	FW	RUS	Sergei Gribov (on loan to Sokol Saratov)
—	DF	MKD	Bojan Dimoski (to (Serbia) TSC, previously on loan to (Serbia) Partizan)
—	FW	CGO	Mavis Tchibota (to (Romania) Sepsi OSK, previously on loan to (Israel) Bnei Sakhnin)

=== Baltika Kaliningrad ===
In: Note: Flags indicate national team as defined under FIFA eligibility rules; some limited exceptions apply. Players may hold more than one non-FIFA nationality.

No.	Pos.	Nation	Player
5	MF	MAR	Aymane Mourid (from (Morocco) Union de Touarga)
14	MF	BIH	Stefan Kovač (from (Serbia) Partizan)
15	FW	NGR	Tenton Yenne (from Ararat-Armenia)
22	MF	RUS	Nikolai Titkov (from Lokomotiv Moscow, previously on loan)
23	DF	RUS	Mingiyan Beveyev (from Ural Yekaterinburg)
25	DF	RUS	Aleksandr Filin (from Khimki)
26	DF	RUS	Ivan Belikov (from Tver)
46	DF	RUS	Kirill Obonin (on loan from Zenit-2 St. Petersburg)
47	MF	RUS	Daniil Utkin (on loan from Rostov)
69	MF	RUS	Irakli Manelov (from Torpedo Moscow)
77	DF	BIH	Eldar Ćivić (from (Hungary) Ferencváros)
90	FW	NGR	Chinonso Offor (from (Bulgaria) Arda Kardzhali)

Out: Note: Flags indicate national team as defined under FIFA eligibility rules; some limited exceptions apply. Players may hold more than one non-FIFA nationality.

No.	Pos.	Nation	Player
5	MF	RUS	Aleksandr Osipov (to Sochi)
9	FW	RUS	Ilya Stefanovich (to Shinnik Yaroslavl)
13	DF	RUS	Denis Terentyev (to Zenit-2 St. Petersburg)
14	FW	RUS	Khyzyr Appayev (to Nart Cherkessk)
18	FW	RUS	Kirill Nikishin (on loan to Rotor Volgograd)
23	DF	RUS	Yevgeni Chernov (end of loan from Rostov)
25	DF	RUS	Nikita Bozov (on loan to Shinnik Yaroslavl)
70	FW	RUS	Abu-Said Eldarushev (on loan to (Belarus) Maxline Vitebsk)
88	DF	RUS	Timofey Shchelkunov (on loan to Shinnik Yaroslavl)
95	DF	RUS	Dmitry Begun (on loan to Tyumen, previously on loan to Sokol Saratov)
99	FW	BLR	Vitaly Lisakovich (to (Slovenia) Celje)
—	GK	RUS	Ilya Svinov (to Rodina Moscow, previously on loan to Ufa)
—	MF	RUS	Yaroslav Arbuzov (on loan to Rotor Volgograd, previously on loan to Chayka Peschanokopskoye)
—	MF	POR	João Lameira (to (Romania) Oțelul Galați, previously on loan)
—	MF	RUS	Vladislav Lazarev (to Sokol Saratov, previously on loan to Chayka Peschanokopskoye)
—	FW	RUS	Nikita Glushkov (to (Belarus) Maxline Vitebsk, previously on loan)

=== CSKA Moscow ===
In: Note: Flags indicate national team as defined under FIFA eligibility rules; some limited exceptions apply. Players may hold more than one non-FIFA nationality.

No.	Pos.	Nation	Player
4	DF	BRA	João Victor (from (Brazil) Vasco da Gama)
7	MF	BRA	Matheus Alves (from (Brazil) São Paulo)
18	MF	ARG	Lionel Verde (on loan from (Argentina) Unión Santa Fe)
19	FW	COL	Daniel Ruiz (on loan from (Colombia) Millonarios)
20	FW	SRB	Matija Popović (from (Italy) Napoli)
24	DF	ARG	Ramiro Di Luciano (from (Argentina) Banfield)
30	MF	RUS	Gleb Popolitov (from Chayka Peschanokopskoye)
37	FW	BRA	Henrique Carmo (from (Brazil) São Paulo)

Out: Note: Flags indicate national team as defined under FIFA eligibility rules; some limited exceptions apply. Players may hold more than one non-FIFA nationality.

No.	Pos.	Nation	Player
4	DF	BRA	Willyan Rocha (to (United Arab Emirates) Al Jazira)
6	MF	RUS	Maksim Mukhin (on loan to Sochi)
9	FW	VEN	Saúl Guarirapa (end of loan from Sochi)
13	DF	BRA	Khellven (to (Brazil) Palmeiras)
15	MF	BIH	Miralem Pjanić
19	MF	RUS	Rifat Zhemaletdinov (to Akhmat Grozny)
20	FW	MLI	Sékou Koïta (on loan to (Turkey) Gençlerbirliği)
21	MF	UZB	Abbosbek Fayzullaev (to (Turkey) İstanbul Başakşehir)
25	MF	CRO	Kristijan Bistrović (to Akron Tolyatti)
45	GK	RUS	Danila Bokov (to (Armenia) Van)
76	FW	RUS	Nikita Savin (on loan to Yenisey Krasnoyarsk)
—	GK	RUS	Vladimir Shaykhutdinov (to Volga Ulyanovsk, previously on loan)
—	DF	RUS	Ilya Agapov (on loan to Akron Tolyatti, previously on loan to Pari Nizhny Novgorod)
—	DF	RUS	Yegor Noskov (to SKA-Khabarovsk, previously on loan)
—	MF	RUS	Andrey Savinov (to Khimik Dzerzhinsk, previously on loan to Tyumen)
—	FW	ARG	Adolfo Gaich (on loan to Krylia Sovetov Samara, previously on loan to (Turkey) Antalyaspor)
—	FW	RUS	Vladislav Yakovlev (to Volga Ulyanovsk, previously on loan to (Armenia) Urartu)

=== Dynamo Makhachkala ===
In: Note: Flags indicate national team as defined under FIFA eligibility rules; some limited exceptions apply. Players may hold more than one non-FIFA nationality.

No.	Pos.	Nation	Player
3	DF	ALG	Imadeddine Azzi (from (Kuwait) Kazma)
6	MF	MAR	El Mehdi El Moubarik (on loan from (United Arab Emirates) Al Ain)
7	FW	TUN	Hazem Mastouri (from (Tunisia) US Monastir)
11	FW	ANG	Miro (from (Portugal) Tondela)
24	DF	COL	Andrés Alarcón (on loan from (Colombia) Patriotas)

Out: Note: Flags indicate national team as defined under FIFA eligibility rules; some limited exceptions apply. Players may hold more than one non-FIFA nationality.

No.	Pos.	Nation	Player
7	MF	RUS	Abakar Gadzhiyev (to Akhmat Grozny)
11	MF	ANG	Egas Cacintura (to Akhmat Grozny)
70	DF	RUS	Valentin Paltsev (on loan to Krasnodar)
96	FW	RUS	Kirill Pomeshkin (on loan to Chernomorets Novorossiysk)
—	DF	RUS	Maksim Khramtsov (to Rotor Volgograd, previously on loan to Tyumen)
—	MF	RUS	Anton Krachkovsky (on loan to Chernomorets Novorossiysk, previously on loan to (Azerbaijan) Turan Tovuz)

=== Dynamo Moscow ===
In: Note: Flags indicate national team as defined under FIFA eligibility rules; some limited exceptions apply. Players may hold more than one non-FIFA nationality.

No.	Pos.	Nation	Player
19	DF	KAZ	Bakhtiyar Zaynutdinov (from (Turkey) Beşiktaş)
21	MF	RUS	Anton Miranchuk (from (Switzerland) Sion)
33	FW	RUS	Ivan Sergeyev (from Krylia Sovetov Samara)
44	MF	BRA	Rubens (from (Brazil) Atlético Mineiro)
55	DF	RUS	Maksim Osipenko (from Rostov)

Out: Note: Flags indicate national team as defined under FIFA eligibility rules; some limited exceptions apply. Players may hold more than one non-FIFA nationality.

No.	Pos.	Nation	Player
2	DF	ISR	Eli Dasa
3	DF	PAR	Fabián Balbuena (to (Brazil) Grêmio)
8	MF	COL	Jorge Carrascal (to (Brazil) Flamengo)
34	MF	GEO	Luka Gagnidze (on loan to (Spain) Granada, previously on loan to Krylia Sovetov Samara)
52	MF	RUS	Yegor Smelov (on loan to Pari Nizhny Novgorod)
69	FW	RUS	Denis Bokov (on loan to Spartak Kostroma)
93	MF	URU	Diego Laxalt
—	GK	RUS	Ilya Kuptsov (to Veles Moscow, previously on loan to KAMAZ)
—	DF	RUS	Stanislav Bessmertny (on loan to Rodina Moscow, previously on loan to Ural Yekaterinburg)
—	DF	RUS	Ivan Lepsky (on loan to Krylia Sovetov Samara, previously on loan to Sokol Saratov)
—	MF	RUS	Daniil Lesovoy (to Pari Nizhny Novgorod, previously on loan to (Cyprus) AEL Limassol)
—	MF	RUS	Ivan Zazvonkin (to Yenisey Krasnoyarsk, previously on loan)

=== Krasnodar ===
In: Note: Flags indicate national team as defined under FIFA eligibility rules; some limited exceptions apply. Players may hold more than one non-FIFA nationality.

No.	Pos.	Nation	Player
2	DF	RUS	Vitali Stezhko (from Chernomorets Novorossiysk)
5	DF	BRA	Jubal (from (France) Auxerre)
14	FW	BRA	Gustavo Furtado (from (Greece) Lamia)
16	GK	RUS	Aleksandr Koryakin (from Rodina Moscow)
17	DF	RUS	Valentin Paltsev (on loan from Dynamo Makhachkala)
23	MF	FRA	Gaëtan Perrin (from (France) Auxerre)
66	MF	BRA	Douglas Augusto (from (France) Nantes)

Out: Note: Flags indicate national team as defined under FIFA eligibility rules; some limited exceptions apply. Players may hold more than one non-FIFA nationality.

No.	Pos.	Nation	Player
13	GK	RUS	Yury Dyupin (to Sochi)
18	MF	RUS	Yury Gazinsky (retired)
19	FW	RUS	Fyodor Smolov
31	DF	BRA	Kaio (to (Brazil) Botafogo)
40	DF	NGR	Olakunle Olusegun (on loan to Pari Nizhny Novgorod)
58	GK	RUS	Danil Ladokha (to Rodina-2 Moscow)
84	DF	RUS	Kirill Dvornikov (to Baltika-2 Kaliningrad)
94	MF	RUS	Dmitry Kuchugura (on loan to Neftekhimik Nizhnekamsk, previously on loan to Ural Yekaterinburg)
—	GK	RUS	Roman Safronov (on loan to Khimik Dzerzhinsk, previously on loan to Forte Taganrog)
—	GK	RUS	Mikhail Shtepa (to Chernomorets Novorossiysk, previously on loan to Chayka)
—	DF	RUS	Ruslan Chobanov (on loan to (Belarus) Dinamo Minsk, previously on loan to Veles Moscow)
—	DF	RUS	Danila Gayvoronsky (to Kuban Krasnodar, previously on loan to Forte Taganrog)
—	DF	RUS	Stanislav Puzanov (to Chernomorets Novorossiysk, previously on loan to Volgar Astrakhan)
—	DF	RUS	Mikhail Sukhoruchenko (to Amkar Perm, previously on loan)
—	DF	RUS	Grigory Zhilkin (to Chernomorets Novorossiysk, previously on loan)
—	MF	SRB	Mihajlo Banjac (to Krylia Sovetov Samara, previously on loan at (Serbia) TSC)
—	MF	RUS	David Kokoyev (to Neftekhimik Nizhnekamsk, previously on loan to Alania Vladikavkaz)
—	FW	RUS	Konstantin Dorofeyev (on loan to (Kazakhstan) Atyrau, previously on loan to (Kazakhstan) Turan)
—	FW	RUS	Yevgeny Kovalevsky (to Kuban Krasnodar, previously on loan to Spartak Kostroma)
—	FW	RUS	Aleksandr Yegurnev (on loan to Zenit-2 St. Petersburg, previously on loan to Murom)

=== Krylia Sovetov Samara ===
In: Note: Flags indicate national team as defined under FIFA eligibility rules; some limited exceptions apply. Players may hold more than one non-FIFA nationality.

No.	Pos.	Nation	Player
7	FW	RUS	Vadim Rakov (on loan from Lokomotiv Moscow)
9	MF	RUS	Aleksei Sutormin (from Zenit St. Petersburg)
14	MF	SRB	Mihajlo Banjac (from Krasnodar)
18	DF	RUS	Ivan Lepsky (on loan from Dynamo Moscow)
23	DF	RUS	Nikita Chernov (on loan from Spartak Moscow)
26	FW	CRC	Jimmy Marín (from Orenburg)
29	FW	BLR	Yegor Karpitsky (end of loan to Sokol Saratov)
38	FW	ARG	Adolfo Gaich (on loan from CSKA Moscow)
47	DF	RUS	Sergei Bozhin (from Fakel Voronezh)
77	MF	RUS	Ilzat Akhmetov (on loan from Zenit St. Petersburg)
80	GK	RUS	Nikita Kokarev (from Khimki)

Out: Note: Flags indicate national team as defined under FIFA eligibility rules; some limited exceptions apply. Players may hold more than one non-FIFA nationality.

No.	Pos.	Nation	Player
1	GK	RUS	Ivan Lomayev (to Sochi)
4	DF	RUS	Aleksandr Soldatenkov (to Sochi)
7	FW	RUS	Dmitri Tsypchenko (to SKA-Khabarovsk)
11	FW	RUS	Roman Yezhov (to Sochi)
13	FW	RUS	Ivan Sergeyev (to Dynamo Moscow)
17	MF	RUS	Ivan Bobyor (on loan to Neftekhimik Nizhnekamsk)
18	MF	RUS	Denis Yakuba (to Chayka Peschanokopskoye)
23	DF	NED	Glenn Bijl (to (Belgium) Antwerp)
53	DF	RUS	Yaroslav Demchenko (to Arsenal-2 Tula)
73	FW	RUS	Vladislav Shitov (on loan to Torpedo Moscow)
81	GK	RUS	Bogdan Ovsyannikov (to Orenburg)
92	FW	RUS	Pavel Popov (on loan to Veles Moscow)
95	DF	RUS	Ilya Gaponov (to Fakel Voronezh)
—	MF	RUS	Nikita Pershin (on loan to Chelyabinsk, previously on loan to SKA-Khabarovsk)
—	FW	RUS	Leonid Gerchikov (to SKA Rostov-on-Don, previously on loan to Murom)
—	FW	RUS	Vladimir Pisarsky (released, previously off on loan to Sochi)

=== Lokomotiv Moscow ===
In: Note: Flags indicate national team as defined under FIFA eligibility rules; some limited exceptions apply. Players may hold more than one non-FIFA nationality.

No.	Pos.	Nation	Player
2	DF	ECU	Cristian Ramírez (from (Hungary) Ferencváros)
7	MF	RUS	Zelimkhan Bakayev (from Zenit Saint Petersburg)
18	DF	UKR	Mark Mampassi (end of loan to (Belgium) Kortrijk)
19	FW	RUS	Aleksandr Rudenko (from Khimki)
25	MF	RUS	Danil Prutsev (on loan from Spartak Moscow)
27	FW	RUS	Nikolay Komlichenko (from Rostov)

Out: Note: Flags indicate national team as defined under FIFA eligibility rules; some limited exceptions apply. Players may hold more than one non-FIFA nationality.

No.	Pos.	Nation	Player
7	FW	ARM	Edgar Sevikyan (end of loan from (Hungary) Ferencváros)
11	FW	RUS	Vadim Rakov (on loan to Krylia Sovetov Samara)
38	MF	RUS	Stanislav Topinka (to Sochi)
71	MF	ARM	Nair Tiknizyan (to (Serbia) Red Star Belgrade)
77	DF	RUS	Ilya Samoshnikov (to Spartak Moscow)
82	DF	RUS	Daniil Lazarev (to Torpedo Vladimir)
87	MF	RUS	Artyom Korneyev (on loan to Sochi)
90	FW	RUS	Aleksandr Morozov (to Akron-2 Tolyatti)
95	MF	RUS	Arseny Gerdt (on loan to Chayka Peschanokopskoye)
99	FW	RUS	Timur Suleymanov (to Rostov)
—	GK	RUS	Timofey Mitrov (to Shinnik Yaroslavl, previously on loan)
—	DF	BLR	Arseniy Ageev (on loan to (Belarus) BATE Borisov, previously on loan to (Belarus) Torpedo-BelAZ Zhodino)
—	MF	RUS	Konstantin Maradishvili (to Akron Tolyatti, previously on loan to Pari Nizhny Novgorod)
—	MF	RUS	Mikhail Shchetinin (to (Belarus) Arsenal Dzerzhinsk, previously on loan to Fakel Voronezh)
—	MF	RUS	Nikolai Titkov (to Baltika Kaliningrad, previously on loan)
—	FW	BLR	Aleksandr Frantsuzov (on loan to (Belarus) Arsenal Dzerzhinsk, previously from Arsenal Dzerzhinsk)
—	FW	RUS	Andrey Nikitin (to Neftekhimik Nizhnekamsk, previously on loan)
—	FW	BRA	Pedrinho (released, previously on loan to (Brazil) Cuiabá)
—	FW	MNE	Marko Rakonjac (to (Greece) OFI, previously on loan to (Hungary) Diósgyőr)

=== Orenburg ===
In: Note: Flags indicate national team as defined under FIFA eligibility rules; some limited exceptions apply. Players may hold more than one non-FIFA nationality.

No.	Pos.	Nation	Player
1	GK	RUS	Bogdan Ovsyannikov (from Krylia Sovetov Samara)
2	DF	RUS	Stanislav Poroykov (from Khimki)
3	DF	RUS	Danila Vedernikov (from Astrakhan)
8	MF	RUS	Vladislav Kamilov (from Akhmat Grozny)
18	DF	MAR	Fahd Moufi (from (Morocco) Wydad)
19	FW	BRA	Alexandre Jesus (from (Brazil) Botafogo-SP)
22	MF	ARM	Pavel Gorelov (from Chernomorets Novorossiysk)
26	DF	BUL	Emil Tsenov (from (Bulgaria) CSKA 1948)
29	MF	MNE	Vladan Bubanja (from (Bosnia and Herzegovina) Sarajevo)
30	FW	BIH	Gedeon Guzina (from Chernomorets Novorossiysk)
33	MF	GEO	Irakli Kvekveskiri (from Fakel Voronezh)
37	MF	BRA	Du Queiroz (on loan from Zenit St. Petersburg)
44	DF	GEO	Anri Chichinadze (from Chernomorets Novorossiysk)
57	MF	RUS	Yevgeni Bolotov (from Rotor Volgograd)
85	FW	RUS	Ivan Ignatyev (from (Algeria) JS Kabylie)

Out: Note: Flags indicate national team as defined under FIFA eligibility rules; some limited exceptions apply. Players may hold more than one non-FIFA nationality.

No.	Pos.	Nation	Player
1	GK	RUS	Bogdan Moskvichyov (end of loan from Zenit St. Petersburg)
8	MF	BIH	Ivan Bašić (to (Kazakhstan) Astana)
9	FW	ARG	Braian Mansilla (to Akhmat Grozny)
10	FW	IRI	Saeid Saharkhizan (to (Iran) Esteghlal)
12	DF	RUS	Andrei Malykh (to Dynamo Kirov)
17	MF	RUS	Aleksandr Lomakin (to Torpedo Moscow, previously from Yenisey Krasnoyarsk)
18	MF	RUS	Aleksandr Kovalenko (to Sochi)
21	MF	ARG	Gabriel Florentín (to (Argentina) Argentinos Juniors)
47	FW	BLR	Timofey Martynov (on loan to (Belarus) Dynamo Brest)
59	DF	RUS	Maksim Syshchenko (on loan to Chernomorets Novorossiysk)
78	FW	RUS	Ivan Gulko (on loan to (Belarus) Slavia Mozyr, previously from Tyumen)
80	FW	CRC	Jimmy Marín (to Krylia Sovetov Samara)
81	DF	RUS	Maksim Sidorov (to Akhmat Grozny)
96	FW	RUS	Aleksey Baranovsky (on loan to Ufa)
—	FW	RUS	Batraz Gurtsiyev (to SKA-Khabarovsk, previously on loan to Sokol Saratov)

=== Pari Nizhny Novgorod ===
In: Note: Flags indicate national team as defined under FIFA eligibility rules; some limited exceptions apply. Players may hold more than one non-FIFA nationality.

No.	Pos.	Nation	Player
3	DF	RUS	Yury Koledin (from Spartak Moscow)
6	MF	GHA	Alex Opoku Sarfo (on loan from (Cyprus) Aris Limassol)
11	FW	GEO	Vakho Bedoshvili (from (Georgia (country)) Orbi Tbilisi)
17	MF	RUS	Yegor Smelov (on loan from Dynamo Moscow)
21	MF	JAM	Renaldo Cephas (from (Turkey) Ankaragücü)
24	DF	PAN	Edgardo Fariña (from Khimki)
32	DF	BLR	Vadim Pigas (from (Belarus) Dinamo Minsk)
40	FW	NGR	Olakunle Olusegun (on loan from Krasnodar)
77	MF	RUS	Andrey Ivlev (from Fakel Voronezh)
88	MF	RUS	Daniil Lesovoy (from Dynamo Moscow)

Out: Note: Flags indicate national team as defined under FIFA eligibility rules; some limited exceptions apply. Players may hold more than one non-FIFA nationality.

No.	Pos.	Nation	Player
7	MF	RUS	Vladislav Karapuzov (on loan to Ural Yekaterinburg)
10	MF	RUS	Aleksandr Troshechkin (on loan to Arsenal Tula)
17	FW	RUS	Stanislav Lapinsky (on loan to Veles Moscow)
24	DF	RUS	Kirill Gotsuk (to (Turkey) Serik Belediyespor)
86	DF	RUS	Ilya Agapov (end of loan from CSKA Moscow)
99	MF	RUS	Stanislav Magkeyev (to Fakel Voronezh)
—	DF	ARM	Artyom Gyurdzhan (to Yenisey Krasnoyarsk, previously on loan to KAMAZ Naberezhnye Chelny)
—	MF	RUS	Kirill Bozhenov (released, previously on loan to Chelyabinsk)
—	MF	RUS	Anton Mukhin (on loan to Sokol Saratov, previously on loan to Dynamo Vladivostok)
—	MF	RUS	Ivan Sutugin (on loan to Chernomorets Novorossiysk, previously on loan to Spartak Kostroma, previously on loan to Rotor Volgograd)
—	FW	RUS	Ilya Kukharchuk (to Chernomorets Novorossiysk, previously on loan to Rotor Volgograd)
—	FW	GEO	Nikoloz Kutateladze (on loan to (Georgia (country)) Kolkheti-1913 Poti, previously on loan to (Georgia (country)) Dinamo Tbilisi)
—	FW	SRB	Ognjen Ožegović (to (Greece) Atromitos, previously on loan to (Turkey) Sakaryaspor)

=== Rostov ===
In: Note: Flags indicate national team as defined under FIFA eligibility rules; some limited exceptions apply. Players may hold more than one non-FIFA nationality.

No.	Pos.	Nation	Player
6	DF	RUS	Aleksandr Tarasov (from Zenit St. Petersburg)
17	FW	NGR	Ibraheem Mahfus Ajasa (from (Egypt) Modern Sport)
28	DF	RUS	Yevgeni Chernov (end of loan to Baltika Kaliningrad)
78	DF	RUS	Dmitri Chistyakov (from Zenit St. Petersburg)
99	FW	RUS	Timur Suleymanov (from Lokomotiv Moscow)

Out: Note: Flags indicate national team as defined under FIFA eligibility rules; some limited exceptions apply. Players may hold more than one non-FIFA nationality.

No.	Pos.	Nation	Player
27	FW	RUS	Nikolay Komlichenko (to Lokomotiv Moscow)
55	DF	RUS	Maksim Osipenko (to Dynamo Moscow)
64	DF	RUS	Aleksandr Mukhin (on loan to SKA-Khabarovsk)
73	FW	RUS	Imran Aznaurov (on loan to Rotor Volgograd)
89	MF	URU	Rodrigo Saravia (to (Argentina) Belgrano)
—	DF	BIH	Dennis Hadžikadunić (on loan to (Italy) Sampdoria, previously on loan to (Germany) Hamburger SV)
—	DF	RUS	Nikita Kotin (to Shinnik Yaroslavl, previously on loan)
—	MF	RUS	Danila Sukhomlinov (to Neftekhimik Nizhnekamsk, previously on loan to Shinnik Yaroslavl)
—	MF	RUS	Daniil Utkin (on loan to Baltika Kaliningrad, previously on loan to Akhmat Grozny)
—	FW	GAM	Ali Sowe (to (Turkey) Çaykur Rizespor, previously on loan)
—	FW	RUS	Maksim Turishchev (on loan to Fakel Voronezh, previously on loan to Rotor Volgograd)

=== Rubin Kazan ===
In: Note: Flags indicate national team as defined under FIFA eligibility rules; some limited exceptions apply. Players may hold more than one non-FIFA nationality.

No.	Pos.	Nation	Player
3	DF	HON	Denil Maldonado (from (Romania) Universitatea Craiova)
12	DF	COL	Anderson Arroyo (from (Spain) Burgos)
14	MF	RUS	Daler Kuzyayev (from (France) Le Havre)
30	MF	RUS	Anton Shvets (from Akhmat Grozny)
43	FW	FRA	Jacques Siwe (from (France) Guingamp)
98	DF	RUS	Nikita Lobov (from Zenit St. Petersburg)

Out: Note: Flags indicate national team as defined under FIFA eligibility rules; some limited exceptions apply. Players may hold more than one non-FIFA nationality.

No.	Pos.	Nation	Player
5	DF	UZB	Rustam Ashurmatov (to (Iran) Esteghlal)
30	MF	ARG	Valentín Vada (to (Saudi Arabia) Damac)
86	GK	RUS	Nikita Korets (on loan to Spartak Kostroma)
90	FW	ALB	Marvin Çuni (on loan to (Italy) Sampdoria)
—	GK	RUS	Artyom Ismagilov (on loan to Shinnik Yaroslavl, previously on loan to Kaluga)
—	GK	RUS	Nikita Yanovich (to Tyumen, previously on loan to Neftekhimik Nizhnekamsk)

=== Sochi ===
In: Note: Flags indicate national team as defined under FIFA eligibility rules; some limited exceptions apply. Players may hold more than one non-FIFA nationality.

No.	Pos.	Nation	Player
3	DF	RUS	Aleksandr Soldatenkov (from Krylia Sovetov Samara)
7	MF	RUS	Anton Zinkovsky (on loan from Spartak Moscow)
8	MF	RUS	Mikhail Ignatov (from Spartak Moscow)
16	MF	RUS	Maksim Mukhin (on loan from CSKA Moscow)
18	MF	RUS	Artyom Korneyev (on loan from Lokomotiv Moscow)
19	MF	RUS	Aleksandr Kovalenko (from Orenburg)
20	MF	RUS	Dmitri Vasilyev (on loan from Zenit St. Petersburg)
25	DF	MAR	Yahya Attiyat Allah (end of loan to (Egypt) Al Ahly)
29	FW	RUS	Roman Yezhov (from Krylia Sovetov Samara)
34	MF	RUS	Aleksandr Osipov (from Baltika Kaliningrad)
44	DF	SRB	Nemanja Stojić (from (Israel) Maccabi Tel Aviv)
45	FW	GUI	François Kamano (from (Saudi Arabia) Damac)
82	DF	RUS	Sergei Volkov (on loan from Zenit St. Petersburg)
88	GK	RUS	Ivan Lomayev (from Krylia Sovetov Samara)
98	FW	RUS	Vladimir Ilyin (from Fakel Voronezh)
99	GK	RUS	Yury Dyupin (from Krasnodar)

Out: Note: Flags indicate national team as defined under FIFA eligibility rules; some limited exceptions apply. Players may hold more than one non-FIFA nationality.

No.	Pos.	Nation	Player
12	GK	RUS	Nikolai Zabolotny
13	DF	RUS	Sergey Terekhov
13	MF	RUS	Maksim Kaynov (on loan to Rotor Volgograd, previously from Arsenal Tula, previously on loan from Arsenal)
15	DF	RUS	Kirill Suslov (to (Tajikistan) Istiklol)
18	MF	RUS	Nikita Burmistrov (retired)
20	MF	RUS	Daniil Martovoy (to Shinnik Yaroslavl)
22	DF	RUS	Oleg Kozhemyakin (on loan to Torpedo Moscow)
23	FW	VEN	Saúl Guarirapa (on loan to (United Arab Emirates) Sharjah, previously on loan to CSKA Moscow)
29	FW	RUS	Kirill Nikitin
37	DF	RUS	Makar Chirkov (on loan to SKA-Khabarovsk)
55	DF	SRB	Lazar Stojsavljević
72	MF	RUS	Ruslan Shagiakhmetov (to Volga Ulyanovsk)
88	MF	BLR	Anatol Makaraw (to Rotor Volgograd)
98	MF	BLR	Roman Pasevich (on loan to (Slovenia) Mura)
—	GK	RUS	Nikita Karabashev (to Dynamo-2 Makhachkala, previously on loan to Sokol Saratov)
—	MF	CIV	Victorien Angban (released, previously on loan to Dynamo Makhachkala)
—	MF	RUS	Danil Anosov (to Tekstilshchik Ivanovo)
—	MF	RUS	Amir Batyrev (to Yenisey Krasnoyarsk, previously on loan)
—	MF	ARM	Hovhannes Harutyunyan (to Noah, previously on loan to Ararat-Armenia)
—	MF	RUS	Stanislav Topinka (on loan to Chayka Peschanokopskoye, previously from Lokomotiv Moscow)

=== Spartak Moscow ===
In: Note: Flags indicate national team as defined under FIFA eligibility rules; some limited exceptions apply. Players may hold more than one non-FIFA nationality.

No.	Pos.	Nation	Player
3	DF	CMR	Christopher Wooh (from (France) Rennes)
4	DF	GHA	Alexander Djiku (from (Turkey) Fenerbahçe)
14	DF	RUS	Ilya Samoshnikov (from Lokomotiv Moscow)
28	MF	RUS	Daniil Zorin (end of loan to Akhmat Grozny)
83	MF	POR	Gedson Fernandes (from (Turkey) Beşiktaş)
91	FW	RUS	Anton Zabolotny (from Khimki)

Out: Note: Flags indicate national team as defined under FIFA eligibility rules; some limited exceptions apply. Players may hold more than one non-FIFA nationality.

No.	Pos.	Nation	Player
4	DF	PAR	Alexis Duarte (to (Brazil) Santos)
14	DF	SUR	Myenty Abena (to (Turkey) Gaziantep)
19	MF	PAR	Jesús Medina (to (Saudi Arabia) Damac)
22	MF	RUS	Mikhail Ignatov (to Sochi)
23	DF	RUS	Nikita Chernov (on loan to Krylia Sovetov Samara)
25	MF	RUS	Danil Prutsev (on loan to Lokomotiv Moscow)
29	DF	POR	Ricardo Mangas (to (Portugal) Sporting)
43	MF	RUS	Ruslan Voytsekhovsky (to Saturn Ramenskoye)
55	MF	RUS	Nikita Posmashny (to Saturn Ramenskoye)
—	DF	RUS	Yury Koledin (to Pari Nizhny Novgorod, previously on loan to Saturn Ramenskoye)
—	DF	RUS	Pavel Maslov (to Chayka Peschanokopskoye, previously on loan to Sochi)
—	MF	RUS	Ivan Pyatkin (to Tyumen, previously on loan)
—	FW	RUS	Vitali Shitov (to Tyumen, previously on loan)
—	FW	RUS	Anton Zinkovsky (on loan to Sochi, previously on loan to Krylia Sovetov Samara)

=== Zenit Saint Petersburg ===
In: Note: Flags indicate national team as defined under FIFA eligibility rules; some limited exceptions apply. Players may hold more than one non-FIFA nationality.

No.	Pos.	Nation	Player
9	MF	BRA	Gerson (from (Brazil) Flamengo)
57	GK	RUS	Bogdan Moskvichyov (end of loan to Orenburg)
66	DF	ARG	Román Vega (from (Argentina) Argentinos Juniors)

Out: Note: Flags indicate national team as defined under FIFA eligibility rules; some limited exceptions apply. Players may hold more than one non-FIFA nationality.

No.	Pos.	Nation	Player
2	DF	RUS	Dmitri Chistyakov (to Rostov)
7	MF	RUS	Ilzat Akhmetov (on loan to Krylia Sovetov Samara)
14	MF	SRB	Saša Zdjelar (released)
43	DF	RUS	Aleksandr Tarasov (to Rostov)
53	DF	RUS	Matvey Bardachyov (on loan to Ural Yekaterinburg)
57	DF	RUS	Nikita Lobov (to Rubin Kazan)
79	MF	RUS	Dmitri Vasilyev (on loan to Sochi)
82	DF	RUS	Sergei Volkov (on loan to Sochi)
—	DF	RUS	Ilya Kirsh (on loan to Chernomorets Novorossiysk, previously on loan to Dynamo Makhachkala)
—	DF	BRA	Robert Renan (on loan to (Brazil) Vasco da Gama, previously on loan to (Saudi Arabia) Al Shabab)
—	MF	RUS	Zelimkhan Bakayev (to Lokomotiv Moscow, previously on loan to Khimki)
—	MF	BRA	Du Queiroz (on loan to Orenburg, previously on loan to (Brazil) Sport Recife)
—	MF	RUS	Aleksei Sutormin (to Krylia Sovetov Samara, previously on loan to Rostov)
