= Matvey Urvantsev =

Russian footballer (born 2004)

Personal information
- Full name: Matvey Stanislavovich Urvantsev
- Date of birth: 29 November 2004 (age 21)
- Place of birth: Chelyabinsk, Russia
- Height: 1.85 m (6 ft 1 in)
- Positions: Centre-forward; right winger

Team information
- Current team: Chelyabinsk (on loan from Nizhny Novgorod)
- Number: 29

Youth career
- –2019: SDYuShOR-3 Chelyabinsk
- 2019–2021: Konoplyov football academy
- 2021–2022: Spartak Moscow
- 2022–2023: UOR #5 Yegoryevsk
- 2023: Chertanovo Moscow

Senior career*
Years	Team	Apps	(Gls)
2024–2025	Chertanovo Moscow	42	(13)
2025–2026	Chelyabinsk	19	(2)
2025	Chelyabinsk-2	1	(0)
2026–	Nizhny Novgorod	10	(0)
2026–	→ Chelyabinsk (loan)	0	(0)
- * Club domestic league appearances and goals as of 11 May 2026

Matvey Stanislavovich Urvantsev (Russian: Матвей Станиславович Урванцев; born 29 November 2004) is a Russian football player who plays as a centre-forward or right winger for Chelyabinsk on loan from Nizhny Novgorod.

== Career ==
On 2 February 2026, Urvantsev signed with Russian Premier League club Pari Nizhny Novgorod. He made his RPL debut for Pari NN on 7 March 2026 in a game against Sochi.

== Career statistics ==
As of 11 May 2026

Club	Season	League			Cup		Total	
Club	Season	Division	Apps	Goals	Apps	Goals	Apps	Goals
Chertanovo Moscow	2024	Russian Second League B	28	8	2	0	30	0
Chertanovo Moscow	2025	Russian Second League B	14	5	—		14	5
Chertanovo Moscow	Total		42	13	2	0	44	13
Chelyabinsk	2025–26	Russian First League	19	2	3	1	22	3
Chelyabinsk-2	2025	Russian Second League B	1	0	—		1	0
Pari Nizhny Novgorod	2025–26	Russian Premier League	10	0	—		10	0
Career total			72	15	5	1	77	16
