= Denis Popenkov =

Russian footballer (born 2006)

Personal information
- Full name: Denis Yuryevich Popenkov
- Date of birth: 3 October 2006 (age 20)
- Height: 1.78 m (5 ft 10 in)
- Position: Left-back

Team information
- Current team: Akron Tolyatti
- Number: 89

Youth career
- –2023: SSh-2 Zvezda St. Petersburg
- 2024: Zenit St. Petersburg
- 2024: SSh-2 Zvezda St. Petersburg

Senior career*
Years	Team	Apps	(Gls)
2024–	Akron-2 Tolyatti	29	(2)
2025–	Akron Tolyatti	7	(0)
- * Club domestic league appearances and goals as of 21 November 2026

Denis Yuryevich Popenkov (Russian: Денис Юрьевич Попенков; born 3 October 2006) is a Russian football player who plays as a left-back for Akron Tolyatti.

== Career ==
Popenkov made his debut for the senior squad of Akron Tolyatti on 12 August 2025 in a Russian Cup game against CSKA Moscow. He made his Russian Premier League debut for Akron on 4 April 2026, also in a game against CSKA Moscow. He started the game and played the full match.

== Career statistics ==
As of 21 November 2026

Club	Season	League			Cup		Other		Total	
Club	Season	Division	Apps	Goals	Apps	Goals	Apps	Goals	Apps	Goals
Akron-2 Tolyatti	2024	Russian Second League B	9	1	—		—		9	1
Akron-2 Tolyatti	2025	Russian Second League B	16	1	—		—		16	1
Akron-2 Tolyatti	2026	Russian Second League B	4	0	—		—		4	0
Akron-2 Tolyatti	Total		29	2	0	0	0	0	29	2
Akron Tolyatti	2025–26	Russian Premier League	2	0	4	0	1 (Note: Appearance in relegation play-offs)	0	7	0
Akron Tolyatti	2026–27	Russian Premier League	5	0	5	0	—		10	0
Akron Tolyatti	Total		7	0	9	0	1	0	17	0
Career total			36	2	9	0	1	0	46	2
