= Nikita Bazilevsky =

Russian footballer (born 2006)

Personal information
- Full name: Nikita Igorevich Bazilevsky
- Date of birth: 5 June 2006 (age 20)
- Place of birth: Nizhnevartovsk, Russia
- Height: 1.83 m (6 ft 0 in)
- Position: Attacking midfielder

Team information
- Current team: Akron Tolyatti; Akron-2 Tolyatti
- Number: 81

Youth career
- –2019: Tyumen
- 2020–2022: Rubin Kazan
- 2022–2024: Zenit St. Petersburg

Senior career*
| Years | Team | Apps | (Gls) |
| 2024–2025 | Zenit-2 St. Petersburg | 8 | (1) |
| 2025– | Akron Tolyatti | 12 | (1) |
| 2025– | → Akron-2 Tolyatti | 4 | (1) |

International career^{‡}
| 2022 | Russia U-17 | 2 | (0) |
| 2023 | Russia U-18 | 3 | (0) |
- * Club domestic league appearances and goals as of 1 November 2026 ‡ National team caps and goals as of 28 October 2023

Nikita Igorevich Bazilevsky (Russian: Никита Игоревич Базилевский; born 5 June 2006) is a Russian football player who plays as an attacking midfielder for Akron Tolyatti and Akron-2 Tolyatti.

== Career ==
On 24 July 2025, Bazilevsky signed with Russian Premier League club Akron Tolyatti. He made his RPL debut for Akron on 24 August 2025 in a game against CSKA Moscow.

== Career statistics ==
As of 1 November 2026

| Club | Season | League | | | Cup | | Total | |
| Club | Season | Division | Apps | Goals | Apps | Goals | Apps | Goals |
|---|---|---|---|---|---|---|---|---|
| Zenit-2 St. Petersburg | 2024 | Russian Second League B | 2 | 0 | – | | 2 | 0 |
| Zenit-2 St. Petersburg | 2025 | Russian Second League B | 6 | 1 | – | | 6 | 1 |
| Zenit-2 St. Petersburg | Total | | 8 | 1 | 0 | 0 | 8 | 1 |
| Akron Tolyatti | 2025–26 | Russian Premier League | 7 | 1 | 5 | 0 | 12 | 1 |
| Akron Tolyatti | 2026–27 | Russian Premier League | 5 | 0 | 4 | 0 | 9 | 0 |
| Akron Tolyatti | Total | | 12 | 1 | 9 | 0 | 21 | 1 |
| Akron-2 Tolyatti | 2025 | Russian Second League B | 2 | 1 | – | | 2 | 1 |
| Akron-2 Tolyatti | 2026 | Russian Second League B | 2 | 0 | – | | 2 | 0 |
| Akron-2 Tolyatti | Total | | 4 | 1 | 0 | 0 | 4 | 1 |
| Career total | | | 24 | 3 | 9 | 0 | 33 | 3 |
