= Aleksandr Metsiyev =

Russian footballer (born 2006)

Personal information
- Full name: Aleksandr Taymurazovich Metsiyev
- Date of birth: 6 April 2006 (age 20)
- Height: 1.84 m (6 ft 0 in)
- Position: Central midfielder

Team information
- Current team: Sochi
- Number: 66

Youth career
- –2022: Krasnodar
- 2022–2023: Zenit Saint Petersburg
- 2023–2024: Sochi

Senior career*
Years	Team	Apps	(Gls)
2025	Sochi-2	30	(1)
2025–	Sochi	1	(0)

International career^{‡}
2021	Russia U15	2	(1)
2021	Russia U16	2	(0)
- * Club domestic league appearances and goals as of 21 March 2026 ‡ National team caps and goals as of 23 September 2021

Aleksandr Taymurazovich Metsiyev (Russian: Александр Таймуразович Мециев; born 6 April 2006) is a Russian football player who plays as a central midfielder for Sochi.

== Club career ==
Metsiyev made his debut in the Russian Premier League for Sochi on 21 March 2026 in a game against Baltika Kaliningrad.

== International career ==
In September 2021, Metsiyev represented Russia under-16 national team in two friendlies against Spain U16, which featured future Euro champion Lamine Yamal.

== Career statistics ==
As of 21 March 2026

Club	Season	League			Cup		Other		Total	
Club	Season	Division	Apps	Goals	Apps	Goals	Apps	Goals	Apps	Goals
Sochi-2	2025	Russian Second League B	30	1	—		—		30	1
Sochi	2024–25	Russian First League	0	0	—		0	0	0	0
Sochi	2025–26	Russian Premier League	1	0	—		—		1	0
Sochi	Total		1	0	0	0	0	0	1	0
Career total			31	1	0	0	0	0	31	1
