= Nikita Lobov =

Russian footballer (born 2005)

Personal information
- Full name: Nikita Konstantinovich Lobov
- Date of birth: 21 July 2005 (age 21)
- Place of birth: Saint Petersburg, Russia
- Height: 1.86 m (6 ft 1 in)
- Position: Centre-back

Team information
- Current team: Rubin Kazan
- Number: 98

Youth career
- Zenit St. Petersburg

Senior career*
Years	Team	Apps	(Gls)
2024–2025	Zenit-2 St. Petersburg	39	(2)
2025	Zenit St. Petersburg	0	(0)
2025–	Rubin Kazan	24	(1)

International career^{‡}
2019	Russia U15	2	(0)
2021	Russia U16	3	(0)
2021–2022	Russia U17	8	(1)
2022	Russia U18	2	(0)
2023–	Russia U21	12	(0)
- * Club domestic league appearances and goals as of 21 November 2026 ‡ National team caps and goals as of 18 November 2025

Nikita Konstantinovich Lobov (Russian: Никита Константинович Лобов; born 21 July 2005) is a Russian football player who plays as a centre-back for Rubin Kazan.

== Career ==
Lobov was raised in the youth system of Zenit St. Petersburg and received his first call-up to the club's senior squad in early 2025. He made his debut for Zenit on 30 July 2025 in a Russian Cup game against Akhmat Grozny.

On 29 August 2025, Lobov signed a four-year contract with Rubin Kazan.

He made his Russian Premier League for Rubin on 20 September 2025 in a game against Akron Tolyatti.

== Career statistics ==
As of 21 November 2026

Club	Season	League			Cup		Total	
Club	Season	Division	Apps	Goals	Apps	Goals	Apps	Goals
Zenit-2 St. Petersburg	2024	Russian Second League B	27	1	–		27	1
Zenit-2 St. Petersburg	2025	Russian Second League B	12	1	–		12	1
Zenit-2 St. Petersburg	Total		39	2	0	0	39	2
Zenit St. Petersburg	2025–26	Russian Premier League	0	0	2	0	2	0
Rubin Kazan	2025–26	Russian Premier League	12	1	3	0	15	1
Rubin Kazan	2026–27	Russian Premier League	12	0	4	0	16	0
Rubin Kazan	Total		24	1	7	0	31	1
Career total			63	3	9	0	72	3

== Personal life ==
His father Konstantin Lobov also played football professionally.
