= Aleksandr Morozov (footballer) =

Russian footballer (born 2006)

Personal information
- Full name: Aleksandr Maksimovich Morozov
- Date of birth: 18 April 2006 (age 20)
- Height: 1.93 m (6 ft 4 in)
- Position: Centre-forward

Team information
- Current team: Akron Tolyatti/ Akron-2 Tolyatti
- Number: 90

Youth career
- –2025: Lokomotiv Moscow

Senior career*
Years	Team	Apps	(Gls)
2025–	Akron-2 Tolyatti	28	(11)
2025–	Akron Tolyatti	1	(0)
- * Club domestic league appearances and goals as of 1 November 2026

Aleksandr Maksimovich Morozov (Russian: Александр Максимович Морозов; born 18 April 2006) is a Russian football player who plays as a centre-forward for Akron Tolyatti and Akron-2 Tolyatti.

== Career ==
Morozov made his senior debut for Akron Tolyatti on 28 August 2025 in a Russian Cup game against Lokomotiv Moscow.

He made his Russian Premier League debut for Akron on 3 May 2026 in a game against Krasnodar.

== Career statistics ==
As of 1 November 2026 (Note: Sportbox and some other statistics websites list Aleksandr Morozov in the squad of Lokomotiv for a Russian Cup game against Dynamo Moscow on 28 November 2024. However, all official sources, such as Russian Football Union and Lokomotiv list Yevgeny Morozov in Lokomotiv's squad.)

Club	Season	League			Cup		Total	
Club	Season	Division	Apps	Goals	Apps	Goals	Apps	Goals
Akron-2 Tolyatti	2025	Russian Second League B	7	2	—		7	2
Akron-2 Tolyatti	2026	Russian Second League B	21	9	—		21	9
Akron-2 Tolyatti	Total		28	11	0	0	28	11
Akron Tolyatti	2025–26	Russian Premier League	1	0	2	0	3	0
Career total			29	11	2	0	31	11
