= Maksim Gerasin =

Russian footballer and coach

Personal information
- Full name: Maksim Yuryevich Gerasin
- Date of birth: 12 March 1974 (age 52)
- Place of birth: Chegdomyn, Khabarovsk Krai, Russian SFSR
- Height: 1.74 m (5 ft 8 1/2 in)
- Position: Goalkeeper

Team information
- Current team: FC Chelyabinsk-2 (assistant manager)

Senior career*
Years	Team	Apps	(Gls)
1991–1993	FC Zenit Chelyabinsk	51	(0)
1995–2001	FC Nosta Novotroitsk	144	(0)
2002–2007	FC Sodovik Sterlitamak	110	(0)
2008	FC Lada Togliatti	1	(0)
2008	FC Olimpia Volgograd	17	(0)
2009	FC Chelyabinsk	8	(0)
2010–2012	FC Torpedo Miass		

Managerial career
- 2014–2023: FC Nosta Novotroitsk (assistant)
- 2023–2025: FC Nosta Novotroitsk
- 2025: FC Chelyabinsk-2
- 2026–: FC Chelyabinsk-2 (assistant)
- * Club domestic league appearances and goals

Maksim Yuryevich Gerasin (Russian: Максим Юрьевич Герасин; born 12 March 1974) is a Russian professional football coach and a former player who is the assistant manager of FC Chelyabinsk-2.

== Club career ==
He played 5 seasons in the Russian Football National League for FC Zenit Chelyabinsk, FC Nosta Novotroitsk and FC Sodovik Sterlitamak.

== Honours ==
- Russian Second Division Zone Ural/Povolzhye best goalkeeper: 2005.
