= Anton Mukhin =

Russian footballer

Personal information
- Full name: Anton Vitalyevich Mukhin
- Date of birth: 27 April 2005 (age 21)
- Height: 1.83 m (6 ft 0 in)
- Position: Defensive midfielder

Team information
- Current team: Sokol Saratov
- Number: 10

Youth career
- –2022: Strogino Moscow
- 2022–: Pari Nizhny Novgorod

Senior career*
Years	Team	Apps	(Gls)
2023–2026	Pari Nizhny Novgorod	10	(0)
2024	→ Pari NN-2 Nizhny Novgorod	11	(0)
2025	→ Dynamo Vladivostok (loan)	6	(0)
2025–2026	→ Sokol Saratov (loan)	31	(1)
2026–	Sokol Saratov	18	(2)
- * Club domestic league appearances and goals as of 15 November 2026

Anton Vitalyevich Mukhin (Russian: Антон Витальевич Мухин; born 27 April 2005) is a Russian football player who plays as a defensive midfielder for Sokol Saratov.

== Career ==
Mukhin made his debut for Pari Nizhny Novgorod on 29 August 2023 in a Russian Cup game against Krasnodar. He made his Russian Premier League debut for Pari NN on 22 July 2024 against Rubin Kazan.

On 19 June 2025, Mukhin moved on loan to Sokol Saratov.

== Career statistics ==
As of match played 7 December 2024

Appearances and goals by club, season and competition
Club	Sason	League			Cup		Europe		Other		Total	
Club	Sason	Division	Apps	Goals	Apps	Goals	Apps	Goals	Apps	Goals	Apps	Goals
Pari Nizhny Novgorod	2023–24	Russian Premier League	0	0	3	0	—		0	0	3	0
Pari Nizhny Novgorod	2024–25	Russian Premier League	10	0	5	0	—		—		15	0
Pari Nizhny Novgorod	Total		10	0	8	0	—		—		18	0
Pari NN-2 Nizhny Novgorod	2024	Russian Second League B	11	0	—		—		—		11	0
Career total			21	0	8	0	0	0	0	0	29	0
