= FC Chayka-M Peschanokopskoye =

Russian football club

- Full name: Football Club Chayka-M Peschanokopskoye
- Founded: 2016
- Ground: Chayka Central Stadium
- Capacity: 3,394
- Manager: Vladimir Usin
- League: Russian Second League, Division B, Group 1
- 2026: 14th
- Website: fc-chayka.ru

FC Chayka-M Peschanokopskoye (Russian: ФК «Чайка-М» Песчанокопское) is a Russian football team from Peschanokopskoye. It is the reserve team for FC Chayka Peschanokopskoye.

== Club history ==
The side was established in 2016 and played in lower amateur levels. For 2026 season, the team was licensed for the Russian fourth-tier Russian Second League Division B. It was assigned to Group 1.

The parent club was relegated from the second tier at the end of the 2025–26 season. Subsequently, they failed to receive a license for the third-tier Second League Division A for financial reasons. As Second League Division B seasons are conducted on a spring-to-fall cycle instead of a fall-to-spring cycle used in the top three tiers, that led to an unusual situation when a reserve team was competing in a national league in the second half of 2026, while the parent club was not.

== Current squad ==
As of 11 September 2026, according to the Second League website.

Note: Flags indicate national team as defined under FIFA eligibility rules; some limited exceptions apply. Players may hold more than one non-FIFA nationality.

No.	Pos.	Nation	Player
9	MF	RUS	Oleg Kozachenko
10	MF	RUS	Musa Mudarov
14	MF	RUS	Aleksandr Syomka
17	DF	RUS	Amin Khachayev
23	FW	RUS	Radislav Veselovsky
24	DF	RUS	Andrey Terekhov
26	FW	RUS	Arseny Vasilenko
27	MF	RUS	Yevgeny Kuzmin
29	DF	RUS	Svyatoslav Briksa
32	FW	RUS	Ilya Kuzmin

No.	Pos.	Nation	Player
33	GK	RUS	Ilya Zavaleyev
47	MF	RUS	Nikita Posmashny
74	DF	RUS	Igor Melikov
77	MF	RUS	Dmitry Penzenko
87	DF	RUS	Ilya Bugayev
91	MF	RUS	Daniil Teryoshkin
96	GK	RUS	Nikita Semyonov
97	MF	RUS	Matvey Torop
99	DF	RUS	Kirill Perelyotov
