= Nikolai Boyarkin =

Russian footballer

Personal information
- Full name: Nikolai Aleksandrovich Boyarkin
- Date of birth: 20 December 2001 (age 24)
- Place of birth: Saransk, Russia
- Height: 1.95 m (6 ft 5 in)
- Position: Midfielder

Team information
- Current team: Salyut Belgorod
- Number: 8

Senior career*
Years	Team	Apps	(Gls)
2019–2020	Mordovia Saransk	11	(0)
2020–2022	Ryazan	44	(6)
2022–2024	Salyut Belgorod	60	(23)
2025	Sibir Novosibirsk	13	(1)
2025–	Salyut Belgorod	40	(5)
- * Club domestic league appearances and goals as of 31 October 2026

Nikolai Aleksandrovich Boyarkin (Russian: Николай Александрович Бояркин; born 20 December 2001) is a Russian football player who plays for Salyut Belgorod.

== Club career ==
He made his debut in the Russian Football National League for Mordovia Saransk on 7 September 2019 in a game against Luch Vladivostok, substituting Yevgeni Strelov in the 82nd minute.
