= Stanislav Ruban =

Ukrainian-born Russian footballer (born 2005)

Personal information
- Full name: Stanislav Borisovich Ruban
- Date of birth: 25 October 1996 (age 30)
- Place of birth: Luhansk, Ukraine
- Height: 1.85 m (6 ft 1 in)
- Position: Forward

Team information
- Current team: Sevastopol
- Number: 9

Youth career
- –2009: LOVUFC Luhansk
- 2010–2013: Zorya Luhansk

Senior career*
Years	Team	Apps	(Gls)
2018–2020	Shakhtar Sverdlovsk (LFS)		
2021–2023	Stroitel Kamensk-Shakhtinsky (amateur)		
2024	Stroitel Kamensk-Shakhtinsky	15	(10)
2024	→ Torpedo-BelAZ Zhodino (loan)	4	(0)
2024	→ Torpedo-BelAZ-2 Zhodino (loan)	9	(1)
2025–	Sevastopol	51	(10)
- * Club domestic league appearances and goals as of 31 October 2026

Stanislav Borisovich Ruban (Russian: Станислав Борисович Рубан; Ukrainian: Станіслав Борисович Рубан; born 25 October 1996) is a Russian and Ukrainian professional footballer who plays for Sevastopol.

== Club career ==
He made his debut in the Russian Second League for Stroitel Kamensk-Shakhtinsky on 31 March 2024 in a game against Rubin Yalta.

He made his debut in the Belarusian Premier League for Torpedo-BelAZ Zhodino on 11 August 2024 in a game against Slutsk.
