= Andrei Ishutin =

Russian footballer

Personal information
- Full name: Andrei Sergeyevich Ishutin
- Date of birth: 20 January 2004 (age 22)
- Place of birth: Novorossiysk, Krasnodar Krai, Russia
- Height: 1.72 m (5 ft 8 in)
- Position: Midfielder

Team information
- Current team: Salyut Belgorod
- Number: 6

Youth career
- 2010–2016: Chernomorets Novorossiysk
- 2016–2023: Spartak Moscow

Senior career*
Years	Team	Apps	(Gls)
2024	Spartak Moscow	0	(0)
2024	→ Rostov-2 (loan)	24	(0)
2025	Arsenal Dzerzhinsk	27	(0)
2026–	Salyut Belgorod	28	(1)

International career^{‡}
2020	Russia U-16	2	(0)
2021	Russia U-18	2	(0)
- * Club domestic league appearances and goals as of 31 October 2026 ‡ National team caps and goals as of 6 September 2021

Andrei Sergeyevich Ishutin (Russian: Андрей Сергеевич Ишутин; born 20 January 2004) is a Russian footballer who plays as a midfielder for Salyut Belgorod.

== Career ==
He made his debut in the Russian Second League for Rostov-2 on 14 April 2024, in a game against Alania-2 Vladikavkaz.

He made his debut in the Belarusian Premier League for Arsenal Dzerzhinsk on 16 March 2025 in a game against Dynamo Brest.
