= Stanislav Topinka =

Russian footballer (born 2006)

Personal information
- Full name: Stanislav Olegovich Topinka
- Date of birth: 18 January 2006 (age 20)
- Place of birth: Khabarovsk, Russia
- Height: 1.83 m (6 ft 0 in)
- Position: Defensive midfielder

Team information
- Current team: Dynamo Bryansk (on loan from Sochi)
- Number: 23

Youth career
- –2017: SKA-Khabarovsk
- 2017–2023: Chertanovo
- 2023–2025: Lokomotiv Moscow

Senior career*
Years	Team	Apps	(Gls)
2025	Lokomotiv Moscow	1	(0)
2025–	Sochi	0	(0)
2025–2026	→ Chayka Peschanokopskoye (loan)	8	(0)
2026–	→ Dynamo Bryansk (loan)	12	(0)

International career^{‡}
2021	Russia U15	4	(2)
2021–2022	Russia U16	8	(0)
2022–2023	Russia U17	8	(1)
2023	Russia U18	3	(1)
2024	Russia U19	4	(1)
2025	Russia U20	2	(0)
2025	Russia U21	1	(0)
- * Club domestic league appearances and goals as of 15 November 2026 ‡ National team caps and goals as of 13 October 2025

Stanislav Olegovich Topinka (Russian: Станислав Олегович Топинка; born 18 January 2006) is a Russian football player who plays as a defensive midfielder for Dynamo Bryansk on loan from Sochi.

== Career ==
Topinka made his debut in the Russian Premier League for Lokomotiv Moscow on 24 May 2025 in a game against Akron Tolyatti.

On 2 August 2025, Topinka signed a four-year contract with Sochi. Six days later, he was loaned to Chayka Peschanokopskoye of the Russian First League for the 2025–26 season.

== Career statistics ==
As of 24 May 2025

Club	Season	League			Cup		Continental		Other		Total	
Club	Season	Division	Apps	Goals	Apps	Goals	Apps	Goals	Apps	Goals	Apps	Goals
Lokomotiv Moscow	2024–25	Russian Premier League	1	0	0	0	–		–		1	0
Career total			1	0	0	0	0	0	0	0	1	0
