= 2025 Russian Second League Division B =

Russian Second League Division B
- Season: 2025
- Dates: 22 March 2025 – 22 November 2025
- Promoted: Dynamo Stavropol; Zenit-2 St. Petersburg; Dynamo Bryansk; Amkar Perm
- Relegated: Kuban-Holding Pavlovskaya; Sochi-2; Kolomna; Znamya Truda Orekhovo-Zuyevo; Uralets-TS Nizhny Tagil; Sokol Kazan

The 2025 Russian Second League Division B is the third season of Russia's fourth-tier football league. The season began on 22 March 2025 and ended on 22 November 2025.

== Overview ==
In the summer of 2023, the Russian Second League was reorganized and split into two tiers - third-tier Russian Second League Division A and fourth-tier Russian Second League Division B. Division B also switched to the spring-to-autumn, March-to-November schedule. 2023 was a transitional half-year season. 2024 season was the first full-length season.

Division B is split into 4 groups, mostly based on geographical location. At the end of the year, four winners of their groups will be promoted into the Division B Second Stage Silver Group. Four bottom teams from the Division A First Stage Silver Group will be relegated to 2026 Division B.

== Team movement ==
At the end of the 2024 season, Forte Taganrog, Dynamo-2 Moscow, Dynamo Vladivostok and Dynamo Kirov were promoted to Division A as winners of their Division B groups. Irtysh Omsk, Khimik Dzerzhinsk, Metallurg Lipetsk and Krasnodar-2 were relegated to Division B from Division A. Following relegation, Krasnodar-2 was suspended indefinitely by their parent club and did not apply for Division B license.

Alania-2 Vladikavkaz was relegated from Division B. Biolog-Novokubansk, Sakhalin Yuzhno-Sakhalinsk, Lada-Tolyatti and Pari NN-2 Nizhny Novgorod were dissolved.

Leon Saturn Ramenskoye was renamed to Saturn Ramenskoye, Baltika-BFU Kaliningrad was renamed to Baltika-2 Kaliningrad. Stroitel Kamensk-Shakhtinsky was moved to Tomsk and re-branded as KDV Tomsk. Kompozit Pavlovsky Posad merged into Znamya Truda Orekhovo-Zuyevo.

Dynamo-2 Makhachkala, Yenisey-2 Krasnoyarsk, Zvezda Saint Petersburg, Kolomna, Kvant Obninsk and Akron-2 Tolyatti, which finished the 2024 season in relegation spots, were kept in the league because of the other teams dropping out or moving zones. That was the second consecutive occasion that happened for Kolomna and Akron-2.

New teams were Cherepovets (promoted from the Russian Amateur Football League), Sochi-2, Rotor-2 Volgograd (farm-clubs of Russian First League clubs) and Chelyabinsk-2 (farm-club of a Second League Division A club).

== Group 1 ==
Group 1 includes 14 teams.

In the first stage, 14 teams played each other twice, home and away, from 22 March 2025 to 14 September 2025. At the end of the first stage, top 6 teams qualified for the second stage subgroup 1A, and the remaining 8 qualified for the second stage subgroup 1B.

The results of the games played in the first stage were included in the second stage standings.

Subgroup 1A teams played each other twice more, home and away, from 20 September 2025 to 22 November 2025. Subgroup 1B teams played each other once, from 20 September 2025 to 1 November 2025.

Subgroup 1A winner will be promoted to the Division A Second Stage Silver Group, the bottom two teams of subgroup 1B will be relegated from Division B.

=== First stage ===
Pos	Team	Pld	W	D	L	GF	GA	GD	Pts	Qualification
1	Dynamo Stavropol	26	15	7	4	38	23	+15	52	Qualification for the Second Stage Subgroup 1A
2	Kuban-Holding Pavlovskaya	26	14	9	3	48	23	+25	51	Qualification for the Second Stage Subgroup 1A
3	Sevastopol	26	13	9	4	41	30	+11	48	Qualification for the Second Stage Subgroup 1A
4	Pobeda Khasavyurt	26	15	3	8	32	25	+7	48	Qualification for the Second Stage Subgroup 1A
5	Rostov-2	26	13	5	8	37	22	+15	44	Qualification for the Second Stage Subgroup 1A
6	Nart Cherkessk	26	12	6	8	37	22	+15	42	Qualification for the Second Stage Subgroup 1A
7	Sochi-2	26	11	7	8	40	29	+11	40	Qualification for the Second Stage Subgroup 1B
8	Druzhba Maykop	26	10	7	9	37	27	+10	37	Qualification for the Second Stage Subgroup 1B
9	Astrakhan	26	9	10	7	33	24	+9	37	Qualification for the Second Stage Subgroup 1B
10	Rubin Yalta	26	9	6	11	26	32	−6	33	Qualification for the Second Stage Subgroup 1B
11	Legion Makhachkala	26	7	8	11	26	42	−16	29	Qualification for the Second Stage Subgroup 1B
12	Angusht Nazran	26	5	8	13	21	31	−10	23	Qualification for the Second Stage Subgroup 1B
13	Spartak Nalchik	26	3	5	18	18	48	−30	14	Qualification for the Second Stage Subgroup 1B
14	Dynamo-2 Makhachkala	26	0	2	24	15	71	−56	2	Qualification for the Second Stage Subgroup 1B

Source: Soccerway

=== Second stage ===
==== Subgroup 1A ====
Pos	Team	Pld	W	D	L	GF	GA	GD	Pts	Qualification
1	Dynamo Stavropol (C, P)	36	21	10	5	55	32	+23	73	Promotion to the Division A Second Stage Silver Group
2	Sevastopol	36	20	12	4	57	36	+21	72	
3	Kuban-Holding Pavlovskaya (Note: On 16 January 2026, the management of Kuban-Holding announced their voluntary relegation from the Russian Second League.) (R)	36	16	14	6	56	29	+27	62	Relegation to the Russian Amateur Football League
4	Nart Cherkessk	36	17	8	11	47	29	+18	59	
5	Pobeda Khasavyurt	36	16	4	16	40	47	−7	52	
6	Rostov-2	36	14	7	15	43	37	+6	49	

Source: Russian Second League
(C) Champions; (P) Promoted; (R) Relegated

===== Top goalscorers =====
Rank	Player	Club	Goals
1	Maksim Dmitriyev	Kuban-Holding Pavlovskaya	17
2	Redvan Osmanov	Sevastopol	15
3	Makhach Abdulkhamidov	Dynamo Stavropol	10
3	Artyom Stepanovich	Dynamo Stavropol	10
5	Aleksandr Olenev	Nart Cherkessk	9
5	Bekkhan Aliyev	Sevastopol	9
5	Ratmir Mashezov	Nart Cherkessk	9

==== Subgroup 1B ====
Pos	Team	Pld	W	D	L	GF	GA	GD	Pts	Qualification
1	Druzhba Maykop	33	15	8	10	50	30	+20	53	
2	Astrakhan	33	14	10	9	42	29	+13	52	
3	Sochi-2 (Note: Sochi-2 was voluntarily relegated.) (R)	33	12	10	11	44	36	+8	46	Relegation to the Russian Amateur Football League
4	Rubin Yalta	33	12	7	14	39	42	−3	43	
5	Legion Makhachkala (Note: Legion was moved to a different city as FC Pobeda Nizhny Novgorod and also moved to Zone 4.)	33	9	9	15	33	58	−25	36	
6	Angusht Nazran	33	7	10	16	27	37	−10	31	
7	Spartak Nalchik (Note: Spartak Nalchik remained in the league for 2026 season despite finishing in relegation zone.)	33	6	8	19	25	50	−25	26	
8	Dynamo-2 Makhachkala (Note: Dynamo-2 remained in the league for 2026 season despite finishing in relegation zone.)	33	0	5	28	21	87	−66	5	

Source: Russian Second League
(R) Relegated

===== Top goalscorers =====
Rank	Player	Club	Goals
1	Gadzhimurad Abdullayev	Druzhba Maykop	15
2	Patcho	Astrakhan	13
3	Ramazan Aliyev	Dynamo-2 Makhachkala	12
4	Asker Delok	Druzhba Maykop	9
5	Amur Balkizov	Sochi-2	8

== Group 2 ==
Group 2 includes 15 teams that played each other twice, home and away, from 30 March 2025 to 2 November 2025. The group winner will be promoted to the Division A Second Stage Silver Group, the bottom two teams will be relegated from Division B.

Pos	Team	Pld	W	D	L	GF	GA	GD	Pts	
1	Zenit-2 Saint Petersburg (C, P)	28	23	4	1	60	20	+40	73	Promotion to the Division A Second Stage Silver Group
2	Dynamo Vologda	28	18	5	5	51	28	+23	59	
3	Irkutsk	28	12	8	8	41	34	+7	44	
4	Spartak-2 Moscow	28	13	5	10	42	32	+10	44	
5	Baltika-2 Kaliningrad	28	10	10	8	46	37	+9	40	
6	Tver	28	9	9	10	36	40	−4	36	
7	Torpedo Vladimir	28	8	12	8	27	29	−2	36	
8	Saturn Ramenskoye	28	9	8	11	38	45	−7	35	
9	Cherepovets	28	9	6	13	35	43	−8	33	
10	Chertanovo Moscow	28	8	8	12	43	45	−2	32	
11	Zvezda Saint Petersburg	28	7	10	11	41	45	−4	31	
12	Luki-Energiya Velikiye Luki	28	7	9	12	26	31	−5	30	
13	Kosmos Dolgoprudny	28	7	8	13	32	37	−5	29	
14	Yenisey-2 Krasnoyarsk (Note: Yenisey-2 was kept in the league for 2026 despite finishing in relegation zone.)	28	6	7	15	28	58	−30	25	
15	Kolomna (R)	28	4	11	13	23	45	−22	23	Relegation to the Russian Amateur Football League

Source: Soccerway
(C) Champions; (P) Promoted; (R) Relegated

=== Top goalscorers ===
Rank	Player	Club	Goals
1	Timur Ivanov	Zenit-2 St. Petersburg	12
1	Maksim Andreyev	Cherepovets	12
1	Roni Mikhaylovsky	Zvezda St. Petersburg	12
4	Ivan Yakovlev	Irkutsk	11
4	Aleksandr Pomalyuk	Chertanovo Moscow	11

== Group 3 ==
Group 3 included 15 teams that played each other twice, home and away, from 28 March 2025 to 1 November 2025. The group winner will be promoted to the Division A Second Stage Silver Group, the bottom team will be relegated from Division B.

FC Khimki-M, the reserve team of FC Khimki, was dissolved on 30 May 2025 after playing 9 games and gaining 7 points and removed from the league on the same day, also reducing the relegation zone from two worst teams to one. According to the league regulations, all the results of Khimki-M games played up to that point were discarded as it played less than half of their scheduled games.

Pos	Team	Pld	W	D	L	GF	GA	GD	Pts	Promotion or relegation
1	Dynamo Bryansk (C, P)	28	19	4	5	49	18	+31	61	Promotion to the Division A Second Stage Silver Group
2	Salyut Belgorod	28	19	3	6	53	24	+29	60	
3	Dynamo St. Petersburg	28	17	8	3	57	20	+37	59	
4	Spartak Tambov	28	16	5	7	47	25	+22	53	
5	Znamya Truda Orekhovo-Zuyevo (Note: Znamya Truda did not enter the 2026 Second League due to financial difficulties.) (R)	28	16	4	8	57	29	+28	52	Relegation to the Russian Amateur Football League
6	Ryazan	28	13	8	7	36	29	+7	47	
7	Metallurg Lipetsk	28	13	5	10	36	25	+11	44	
8	Oryol	28	10	8	10	36	37	−1	38	
9	Arsenal-2 Tula	28	9	6	13	39	39	0	33	
10	Rodina-M Moscow	28	8	8	12	39	46	−7	32	
11	Zenit Penza	28	8	4	16	26	40	−14	28	
12	SKA-Khabarovsk-2	28	8	3	17	39	64	−25	27	
13	Rotor-2 Volgograd	28	5	8	15	26	44	−18	23	
14	Strogino Moscow	28	6	3	19	31	73	−42	21	
15	Kvant Obninsk (Note: Kvant remained in the league for 2026 despite finishing in the relegation zone)	28	1	7	20	17	75	−58	10	

Source: Soccerway
(C) Champions; (P) Promoted; (R) Relegated

=== Top goalscorers ===
Rank	Player	Club	Goals
1	Gocha Gogrichiani	Oryol	15
2	Vladislav Morozov	Znamya Truda Orekhovo-Zuyevo	13
3	Timur Zhamaletdinov	Znamya Truda Orekhovo-Zuyevo	12
3	Daniil Konoplyov	Dynamo Bryansk	12
5	Stepan Glotov	SKA-Khabarovsk-2	11
5	Nikita Pogrebnev	Ryazan	11

== Group 4 ==
Group 4 included 14 teams that played each other twice, home and away, from 12 April 2025 to 19 October 2025. The group winner will be promoted to the Division A Second Stage Silver Group, the bottom two teams will be relegated from Division B.

Pos	Team	Pld	W	D	L	GF	GA	GD	Pts	Promotion or relegation
1	Amkar Perm (C, P)	26	20	3	3	60	19	+41	63	Promotion to the Division A Second Stage Silver Group
2	Khimik Dzerzhinsk	26	19	5	2	56	20	+36	62	
3	KDV Tomsk	26	13	7	6	41	25	+16	46	
4	Orenburg-2	26	12	10	4	41	24	+17	46	
5	Uralets-TS Nizhny Tagil (Note: In November 2025, Uralets-TS announced that the club will voluntarily drop out of the Second League for the 2026 season.) (R)	26	12	6	8	37	28	+9	42	Relegation to the Russian Amateur Football League
6	Dynamo Barnaul	26	12	5	9	30	40	−10	41	
7	Volna Nizhny Novgorod Oblast	26	12	4	10	33	35	−2	40	
8	Rubin-2 Kazan	26	11	6	9	40	30	+10	39	
9	Krylia Sovetov-2 Samara	26	7	8	11	29	39	−10	29	
10	Akron-2 Tolyatti	26	8	3	15	41	52	−11	27	
11	Chelyabinsk-2	26	7	6	13	18	40	−22	27	
12	Ural-2 Yekaterinburg	26	5	6	15	22	53	−31	21	
13	Nosta Novotroitsk (Note: Nosta remained in the league for 2026 season despite finishing in the relegation zone)	26	5	4	17	24	52	−28	19	
14	Sokol Kazan (Note: On 15 July 2025, Sokol announced the club will drop out of the Second League competition due to financial issues. As they played half of their scheduled games at that point, all their remaining games will be awarded to the opponents, without adjustments to the goal difference. The results of the games they did play will remain in place.) (R)	26	2	1	23	8	23	−15	7	Relegation to the Russian Amateur Football League

Source: Soccerway
(C) Champions; (P) Promoted; (R) Relegated

=== Top goalscorers ===
Rank	Player	Club	Goals
1	Ilya Yurchenko	Khimik Dzerzhinsk	20
2	Daniil Zuyev	Amkar Perm	13
2	Artyom Kotik	Amkar Perm	13
4	Aleksandr Podbeltsev	Uralets-TS Nizhny Tagil	11
5	Artyom Yarkin	Dynamo Barnaul	10
