= Sergei Vakhteyev =

Russian footballer

Personal information
- Full name: Sergei Nikolayevich Vakhteyev
- Date of birth: 11 February 1987 (age 39)
- Place of birth: Tolyatti, Russian SFSR
- Height: 1.92 m (6 ft 3 1/2 in)
- Position: Forward

Team information
- Current team: FC Akron-2 Tolyatti (manager)

Senior career*
Years	Team	Apps	(Gls)
2004	FC Yunost Tolyatti		
2005	SKP Tolyatti		
2005–2006	FC Progress Rostov-on-Don		
2006	FC Energetik Uren	7	(0)
2007	FC Energetik Uren (amateur)		
2008	FC Zenit Penza	23	(2)
2009	FC Zenit Penza (amateur)		
2010–2011	FC Zenit Penza	38	(6)
2010	→ FC Gazovik Orenburg (loan)	9	(0)
2012	FC Neftekhimik Nizhnekamsk	4	(0)
2012–2013	FC Syzran-2003	15	(1)
2013–2014	FC Znamya Truda Orekhovo-Zuyevo	29	(2)
2014–2018	FC Lada Tolyatti		
2018	FC Akron Tolyatti (amateur)		
2019–2020	FC Akron Tolyatti	24	(2)

Managerial career
- 2023–2025: Akademiya Konopleva U19
- 2025–: FC Akron-2 Tolyatti
- * Club domestic league appearances and goals

Sergei Nikolayevich Vakhteyev (Russian: Сергей Николаевич Вахтеев; born 11 February 1987) is a Russian football coach and a former player who is the manager of FC Akron-2 Tolyatti.

== Club career ==
He made his debut in the Russian Football National League for FC Akron Tolyatti on 1 August 2020 in a game against FC Fakel Voronezh, he substituted Daur Kvekveskiri in the 57th minute.

== Managerial career ==
In July 2023, he was appointed a manager of the Russian Youth League team Akademiia Konopleva U19.
