= Konstantin Lobov =

Russian footballer

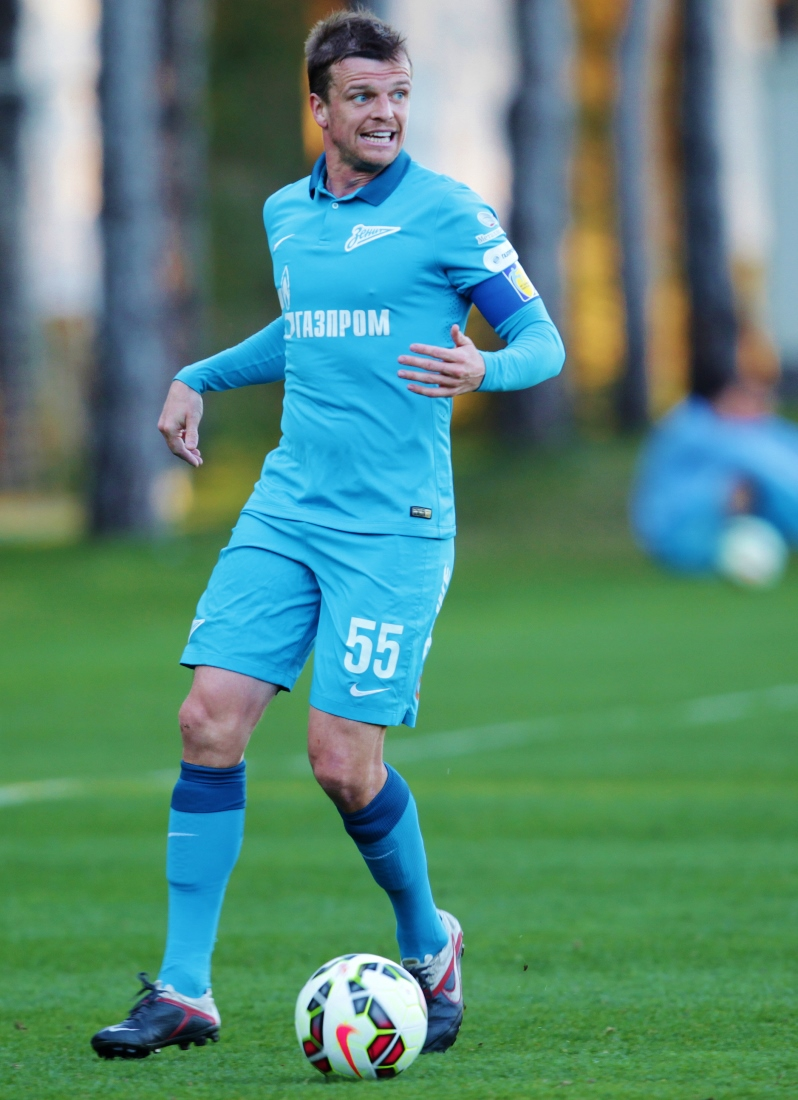
- Lobov with Zenit Saint Petersburg in 2015

Personal information
- Full name: Konstantin Yuryevich Lobov
- Date of birth: 2 May 1981 (age 45)
- Place of birth: Kolpino, Saint Petersburg, Russian SFSR
- Height: 1.81 m (5 ft 11 1/2 in)
- Position: Defender

Youth career
- Smena Saint Petersburg

Senior career*
Years	Team	Apps	(Gls)
1998–2000	Zenit-2 Saint Petersburg	63	(6)
2001	→ Lokomotiv-Zenit-2 Saint Petersburg (loan)	36	(2)
2002–2004	Zenit Saint Petersburg	15	(0)
2004–2007	Luch-Energiya Vladivostok	63	(2)
2008–2009	Vityaz Podolsk	59	(2)
2010	Dynamo Saint Petersburg	24	(0)
2011	Piter Saint Petersburg (amateur)		
2012–2013	Rus Saint Petersburg	28	(0)
2014–2017	Zenit Saint Petersburg	0	(0)
2014–2017	→ Zenit-2 Saint Petersburg	69	(3)

Managerial career
- 2017–2018: Zenit-2 Saint Petersburg (assistant)
- 2018–2022: Zenit Saint Petersburg (U-19 assistant)
- 2022–2023: Chernomorets Novorossiysk (assistant)
- 2024: Leningradets Leningrad Oblast (assistant)
- * Club domestic league appearances and goals

Konstantin Yuryevich Lobov (Russian: Константин Юрьевич Лобов; born 2 May 1981) is a Russian professional football coach and a former player.

== Club career ==
He made his debut in the Russian Premier League in 2003 for Zenit Saint Petersburg.

== Personal life ==
His son Nikita Lobov is also a professional footballer.

== Honours ==
- Russian Premier League runner-up: 2003
