= Yegor Smelov =

Russian footballer

Personal information
- Full name: Yegor Aleksandrovich Smelov
- Date of birth: 11 March 2005 (age 21)
- Place of birth: Saint Petersburg, Russia
- Height: 1.77 m (5 ft 10 in)
- Position: Attacking midfielder

Team information
- Current team: Dynamo Makhachkala
- Number: 52

Youth career
- –2021: SShOR Zenit St. Petersburg
- 2021–2022: Dynamo Moscow

Senior career*
Years	Team	Apps	(Gls)
2022–2026	Dynamo Moscow	4	(0)
2022–2025	→ Dynamo-2 Moscow	45	(4)
2025–2026	→ Pari Nizhny Novgorod (loan)	14	(0)
2026–	Dynamo Makhachkala	9	(0)

International career^{‡}
2019	Russia U-15	3	(1)
2021	Russia U-16	3	(3)
2022	Russia U-17	2	(0)
2023–	Russia U-21	5	(0)
- * Club domestic league appearances and goals as of 22 November 2026 ‡ National team caps and goals as of 24 March 2025

Yegor Aleksandrovich Smelov (Russian: Егор Александрович Смелов; born 11 March 2005) is a Russian football player who plays as an attacking midfielder or right winger for Dynamo Makhachkala.

== Career ==
Smelov made his debut for Dynamo Moscow on 31 July 2024 in a Russian Cup game against Spartak Moscow. He made his Russian Premier League debut for Dynamo on 8 March 2025 against FC Dynamo Makhachkala.

On 8 September 2025, Smelov was loaned to Pari Nizhny Novgorod, with an option to buy.

On 31 July 2026, Smelov signed a four-year contract with Dynamo Makhachkala.

== Career statistics ==
As of match played 22 November 2026

Appearances and goals by club, season and competition
Club	Season	League			Cup		Total	
Club	Season	Division	Apps	Goals	Apps	Goals	Apps	Goals
Dynamo-2 Moscow	2022–23	Russian Second League	14	2	—		14	2
Dynamo-2 Moscow	2023	Russian Second League B	12	1	—		12	1
Dynamo-2 Moscow	2024	Russian Second League B	14	0	—		14	0
Dynamo-2 Moscow	2024–25	Russian Second League A	3	1	—		3	1
Dynamo-2 Moscow	2025–26	Russian Second League A	2	0	—		2	0
Dynamo-2 Moscow	Total		45	4	—		45	4
Dynamo Moscow	2024–25	Russian Premier League	2	0	2	0	4	0
Dynamo Moscow	2025–26	Russian Premier League	2	0	3	0	5	0
Dynamo Moscow	Total		4	0	5	0	9	0
Pari Nizhny Novgorod (loan)	2025–26	Russian Premier League	14	0	3	0	17	0
Dynamo Makhachkala	2026–27	Russian Premier League	9	0	4	0	13	0
Career total			72	4	12	0	84	4
