= Russia national under-21 football team =

National association football team

Russia Under-21
- Nickname(s): Молодежка / Molodezhka (Junior); Молодежная Сборная / Molodezhnaya Sbornaya (Junior Team)
- Association: Russian Football Union
- Confederation: UEFA (Europe)
- Head coach: Ivan Shabarov
- FIFA code: RUS
First colours	Second colours

First international
- Denmark 2–2 Russia (Copenhagen, Denmark; 25 August 1992)

Biggest win
- Luxembourg 0–10 Russia (Pétange, Luxembourg; 6 June 2001)

Biggest defeat
- Chile 5–0 Russia (Toulon, France; 21 May 2010)

European U-21 Championship
- Appearances: 7 (first in 1980, as Soviet Union)
- Best result: Winners (1980, 1990)

The Russia national under-21 football team is overseen by the Russian Football Union. The team competed in the UEFA European Under-21 Championship, held every two years, and international friendly matches. The team also participated in the qualification for the Olympic Games.

On 28 February 2022, in accordance with a recommendation by the International Olympic Committee (IOC), FIFA and UEFA suspended the participation of Russia, including in the Qatar 2022 World Cup. The Russian Football Union unsuccessfully appealed the FIFA and UEFA bans to the Court of Arbitration for Sport, which upheld the bans.

== History ==
=== UEFA U-21 Championship Record ===
- FIFA considers Russia the direct successor to the Soviet Union, and therefore the inheritor to all its records.

Champions Runners-up Third Place Fourth Place

Year	Round	GP	W	D*	L	GS	GA
part of Soviet Union
(Europe) 1978	Did not qualify	4	2	1	1	5	1
(Europe) 1980	Champions	10	7	3	0	16	3
(Europe) 1982	Semi-finals	8	2	4	2	8	11
(Europe) 1984	Did not qualify	6	2	3	1	8	6
(Europe) 1986	Did not qualify	6	3	0	3	8	8
(Europe) 1988	Did not qualify	6	3	0	3	7	9
(Europe) 1990	Champions	12	8	3	1	25	11
Total	2 title	52	27	14	11	77	49
as Russia
(Europe) 1992	Did not qualify	6	2	3	1	6	4
(France) 1994	Quarter-Finals	10	6	2	2	25	7
(Spain) 1996	Did not qualify	8	4	1	3	17	6
(Romania) 1998	Quarter-Finals	9	6	1	2	27	8
(Slovakia) 2000	Did not qualify	8	6	0	2	17	5
(Switzerland) 2002	Did not qualify	8	4	3	1	23	9
(Germany) 2004	Did not qualify	8	5	0	3	14	8
(Portugal) 2006	Did not qualify	12	6	1	5	25	10
(Netherlands) 2007	Did not qualify	4	3	0	1	12	6
(Sweden) 2009	Did not qualify	8	5	0	3	14	6
(Denmark) 2011	Did not qualify	10	7	1	2	22	6
(Israel) 2013	Group Stage	13	6	3	4	23	17
(Czech Republic) 2015	Did not qualify	10	7	1	2	22	12
(Poland) 2017	Did not qualify	10	2	3	5	15	19
(Italy) (San Marino) 2019	Did not qualify	10	6	1	3	25	13
(Hungary) (Slovenia) 2021	Group Stage	13	8	2	3	26	10
(Romania) (Georgia (country)) 2023	Disqualified						
(Slovakia) 2025	Suspended						
(Albania) (Serbia) 2027	Suspended						
Total	Quarter-Finals	199	110	36	53	390	195

*Draws include knockout matches decided by penalty shootout.

=== Olympic Games ===
Summer Olympic record
Year	Round	Position	GP	W	D*	L	GS	GA	Squad
(Spain) 1992	Did not qualify								
(United States) 1996	Did not qualify								
(Australia) 2000	Did not qualify								
(Greece) 2004	Did not qualify								
(China) 2008	Did not qualify								
(United Kingdom) 2012	Did not qualify								
(Brazil) 2016	Did not qualify								
(Japan) 2020	Did not qualify								
(France) 2024	Disqualified								
(United States) 2028	Suspended								
Total	-	-	-	-	-	-	-	-	-

== Results and fixtures ==
The following is a list of match results in the last 12 months, as well as any future matches that have been scheduled.

Legend

Win Draw Lose Fixture

== Honours ==
- UEFA European Under-21 Championship
  - Winners: 1980, 1990
- CIS Cup
  - Champions: 2012, 2013, 2016
- Toulon Tournament
  - Champions: 1979

== Coaches ==
1992–1993	Boris Ignatyev
1994–1998	Mikhail Gershkovich
1998–1999	Leonid Pakhomov
2000–2001	Valeri Gladilin
2001–2002	Valery Gazzaev
2002–2005	Andrei Chernyshov
2006	Aleksandr Borodyuk, Viktor Losev
2007–2008	Boris Stukalov
2008–2010	Igor Kolyvanov
2010–2015	Nikolai Pisarev
2015	Dmitri Khomukha
2016–2017	Nikolai Pisarev
2017–2018	Yevgeni Bushmanov
2018–2023	Mikhail Galaktionov
2023–	Ivan Shabarov

== Current squad ==
The following players have been called up for friendlies on 5 June 2025 and 8 June 2025, both against the Uzbekistan national under-21 football team.

The caps and goals are correct after the match against Uzbekistan U21 on 8 June 2025.

No.	Pos.	Player	Date of birth (age)	Caps	Goals	Club
	GK	Mikhail Tsulaya	8 February 2005 (age 21)	3	0	(Russian Football Union) Arsenal Tula
	GK	Daniil Veselov	30 January 2005 (age 21)	1	0	(Russian Football Union) Lokomotiv Moscow
	DF	Mikhail Ryadno	18 September 2005 (age 21)	12	1	(Russian Football Union) Rodina Moscow
	DF	Nikita Lobov	21 July 2005 (age 21)	8	0	(Russian Football Union) Zenit Saint Petersburg
	DF	Ilya Rozhkov	29 March 2005 (age 21)	8	0	(Russian Football Union) Rubin Kazan
	DF	Vadim Churilov	19 July 2005 (age 21)	5	0	(Russian Football Union) Torpedo Moscow
	DF	Ivan Lepsky	19 January 2005 (age 21)	3	1	(Russian Football Union) Sokol Saratov
	DF	German Ignatov	11 August 2005 (age 21)	3	0	(Russian Football Union) Rostov
	DF	Ivan Shilyonok	29 January 2005 (age 21)	3	0	(Russian Football Union) Zenit-2 Saint Petersburg
	DF	Nikita Bozov	28 January 2005 (age 21)	3	0	(Russian Football Union) Baltika Kaliningrad
	MF	Aleksey Koltakov	14 November 2005 (age 20)	8	2	(Russian Football Union) Rostov
	MF	Ilya Ishkov	25 May 2005 (age 21)	7	3	(Russian Football Union) Ural Yekaterinburg
	MF	Denis Bokov	6 October 2005 (age 21)	6	2	(Russian Football Union) Dynamo Moscow
	MF	Danila Kozlov	19 January 2005 (age 21)	5	1	(Russian Football Union) Krasnodar
	MF	Mikhail Shchetinin	8 July 2005 (age 21)	5	0	(Russian Football Union) Lokomotiv Moscow
	MF	Yegor Smelov	11 March 2005 (age 21)	5	0	(Russian Football Union) Dynamo Moscow
	MF	Vadim Rakov	9 January 2005 (age 21)	4	1	(Russian Football Union) Lokomotiv Moscow
	MF	Kirill Glebov	10 November 2005 (age 21)	3	1	(Russian Football Union) CSKA Moscow
	MF	Viktor Okishor	30 December 2006 (age 19)	2	1	(Russian Football Union) Dynamo Moscow
	MF	Dmitry Pestryakov	8 December 2006 (age 19)	2	1	(Russian Football Union) Akron Tolyatti
	MF	Dmitri Aleksandrov	31 July 2006 (age 20)	2	0	(Russian Football Union) Dynamo Moscow
	FW	Anton Shamonin	28 March 2005 (age 21)	4	3	(Russian Football Union) Rostov
	FW	Konstantin Dorofeyev	17 August 2005 (age 21)	4	2	(Kazakhstan Football Federation) Atyrau

=== Recent call-ups ===
The following players have been called up for the team within the last 12 months and are still eligible for selection.

Pos.	Player	Date of birth (age)	Caps	Goals	Club	Latest call-up

== See also ==
- Soviet Union national under-21 football team
- Russia national football team
- Russia national under-19 football team
- Russia national under-17 football team
- European Under-21 Football Championship
