= Mikhail Shchetinin (footballer) =

Russian footballer (born 2005)

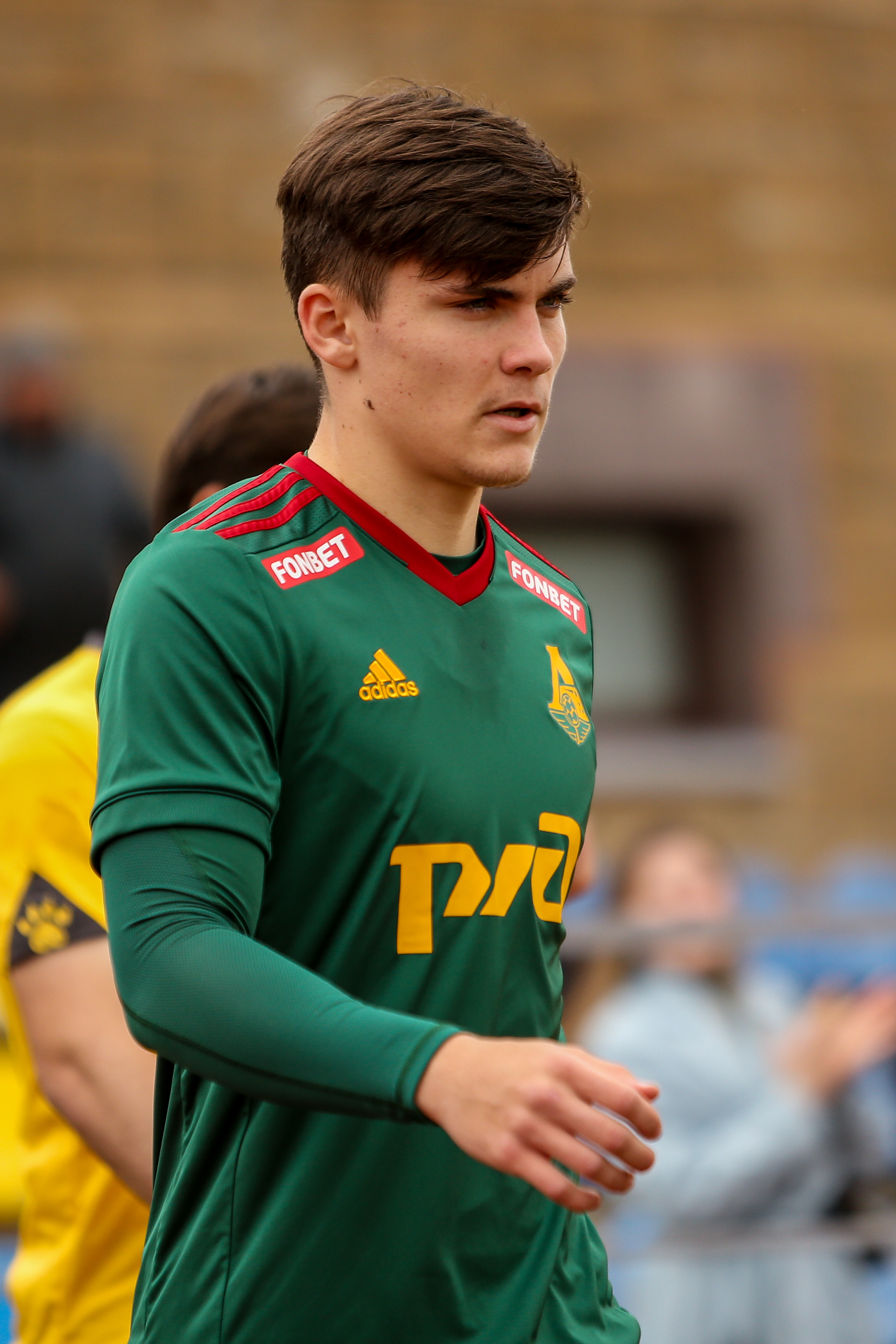
- Youth Football League 2023

Personal information
- Full name: Mikhail Vadimovich Shchetinin
- Date of birth: 8 July 2005 (age 21)
- Place of birth: Kursk, Russia
- Height: 1.83 m (6 ft 0 in)
- Position: Midfielder

Team information
- Current team: Lokomotiv Moscow
- Number: 88

Youth career
- Lokomotiv Moscow

Senior career*
| Years | Team | Apps | (Gls) |
| 2022–2025 | Lokomotiv Moscow | 3 | (0) |
| 2024–2025 | → Fakel Voronezh (loan) | 14 | (0) |
| 2025 | Arsenal Dzerzhinsk | 13 | (0) |
| 2026– | Lokomotiv Moscow | 4 | (0) |

International career^{‡}
| 2020 | Russia U15 | 1 | (0) |
| 2021 | Russia U16 | 3 | (0) |
| 2021–2022 | Russia U17 | 8 | (0) |
| 2022 | Russia U18 | 4 | (0) |
| 2023–2025 | Russia U21 | 5 | (0) |
- * Club domestic league appearances and goals as of 22 November 2026 ‡ National team caps and goals as of 16 June 2026

Mikhail Vadimovich Shchetinin (Russian: Михаил Вадимович Щетинин; born 8 July 2005) is a Russian footballer who plays as a midfielder for Lokomotiv Moscow.

== Club career ==
Shchetinin made his debut for Lokomotiv Moscow on 27 November 2022 in a Russian Cup game against Pari NN. He made his Russian Premier League debut for Lokomotiv on 18 March 2023 against Krasnodar.

On 27 July 2023, Shchetinin extended his contract with Lokomotiv to June 2026.

On 13 June 2024, Shchetinin joined Fakel Voronezh on a season-long loan.

On 14 July 2025, Shchetinin moved to Arsenal Dzerzhinsk in Belarus, with Lokomotiv holding a buy-back option.

== Personal life ==
His older brother Kirill Shchetinin is also a footballer.

== Career statistics ==
As of match played 22 November 2026

Appearances and goals by club, season and competition
| Club | Season | League | | | Cup | | Total | |
| Club | Season | Division | Apps | Goals | Apps | Goals | Apps | Goals |
|---|---|---|---|---|---|---|---|---|
| Lokomotiv Moscow | 2022–23 | Russian Premier League | 3 | 0 | 2 | 0 | 5 | 0 |
| Lokomotiv Moscow | 2023–24 | Russian Premier League | 0 | 0 | 3 | 0 | 3 | 0 |
| Lokomotiv Moscow | Total | | 3 | 0 | 5 | 0 | 8 | 0 |
| Fakel Voronezh (loan) | 2024–25 | Russian Premier League | 14 | 0 | 4 | 0 | 18 | 0 |
| Arsenal Dzerzhinsk | 2025 | Belarusian Premier League | 13 | 0 | 1 | 0 | 14 | 0 |
| Lokomotiv Moscow | 2025–26 | Russian Premier League | 0 | 0 | 0 | 0 | 0 | 0 |
| Lokomotiv Moscow | 2026–27 | Russian Premier League | 4 | 0 | 4 | 0 | 8 | 0 |
| Lokomotiv Moscow | Total | | 4 | 0 | 4 | 0 | 8 | 0 |
| Lokomotiv Moscow | Club total | | 7 | 0 | 9 | 0 | 16 | 0 |
| Career total | | | 34 | 0 | 14 | 0 | 48 | 0 |
