= Yevgeni Strelov =

Russian footballer

Personal information
- Full name: Yevgeni Vladimirovich Strelov
- Date of birth: 5 June 1999 (age 27)
- Place of birth: Nizhny Novgorod, Russia
- Height: 1.85 m (6 ft 1 in)
- Position: Defender

Youth career
- 2005–2011: Krasnoye Sormovo Nizhny Novgorod
- 2011–2014: FC Saturn Ramenskoye

Senior career*
| Years | Team | Apps | (Gls) |
| 2014–2017 | FC Mordovia-2 Saransk | | |
| 2017–2020 | FC Mordovia Saransk | 18 | (0) |
| 2020–2021 | FC Shinnik Yaroslavl | 8 | (0) |
| 2021 | FC Volna Nizhny Novgorod Oblast | 12 | (1) |
| 2022 | FC Khimik Dzerzhinsk | 5 | (1) |
- * Club domestic league appearances and goals as of 5 June 2022

Yevgeni Vladimirovich Strelov (Russian: Евгений Владимирович Стрелов; born 5 June 1999) is a Russian football player.

== Club career ==
He made his debut in the Russian Professional Football League for FC Mordovia Saransk on 27 May 2018 in a game against FC Ural-2 Yekaterinburg. He made his Russian Football National League debut for Mordovia on 7 April 2019 in a game against FC Avangard Kursk.
