= FC Pobeda Nizhny Novgorod =

Pobeda Nizhny Novgorod
- Full name: Football Club Pobeda Nizhny Novgorod
- Founded: 2026
- Ground: Meshchersky Stadium
- Capacity: 500
- Manager: Hennadiy Zubov
- League: Russian Second League; Division B Group 4
- 2026: 4th
- Website: vk.com/club231834301

FC Pobeda Nizhny Novgorod (Russian: ФК «Победа» Нижний Новгород) is a Russian football club based in Nizhny Novgorod.

== Club history ==
In late 2025, Russian Second League club FC Legion Makhachkala was bought by a new owner Vadim Galitsky, relocated to Nizhny Novgorod and renamed to Pobeda.

== Current squad ==
As of 13 September 2026, according to the Second League website.

Note: Flags indicate national team as defined under FIFA eligibility rules; some limited exceptions apply. Players may hold more than one non-FIFA nationality.

No.	Pos.	Nation	Player
1	GK	RUS	Yegor Koshkin
2	DF	RUS	Ramis Gaynutdinov
3	DF	RUS	Igor Semyonov
4	DF	RUS	Aleksandr Dyomin
5	DF	RUS	Arseny Yefremov
7	FW	RUS	Rustam Telyakavov
8	MF	RUS	Ivan Shovitov
9	FW	RUS	Yegor Grushin
10	MF	RUS	Vitaly Dunay (on loan from Tekstilshchik Ivanovo)
11	MF	RUS	Yegor Burdenev
13	DF	RUS	Dzhamal Bakyr
15	MF	RUS	Timofey Fadeyev
17	MF	RUS	Anton Gurylyov
18	FW	RUS	Arseny Zuykov

No.	Pos.	Nation	Player
19	FW	RUS	Nazar Vakulenko
20	MF	RUS	Aleksandr Arzhanov
21	MF	RUS	Ivan Kabayev
23	DF	RUS	Roman Artyomenko
25	DF	RUS	Pavel Bochugov
27	FW	RUS	Roman Kozlov
32	FW	RUS	Magomed Magomedov
33	GK	RUS	Konstantin Melentyev (on loan from Nizhny Novgorod)
37	MF	RUS	Yegor Maksimov
42	MF	RUS	Arseny Kondoyanidi
51	DF	RUS	Matvey Masterkov
73	MF	RUS	Rinat Abzalilov
77	DF	RUS	David Gigolayev
99	FW	RUS	Abdurakhman Kurbanaliyev
