= Nikita Karabashev =

Russian footballer (born 2002)

Personal information
- Full name: Nikita Aleksandrovich Karabashev
- Date of birth: 30 June 2002 (age 24)
- Place of birth: Sibay, Russia
- Height: 1.93 m (6 ft 4 in)
- Position: Goalkeeper

Team information
- Current team: Dynamo Makhachkala
- Number: 33

Youth career
- 2009–2019: SSHoR-5 Yunost Kaliningrad
- 2019–2020: Zenit St. Petersburg

Senior career*
Years	Team	Apps	(Gls)
2020–2024	Leningradets	29	(0)
2024–2025	Sochi	7	(0)
2025	→ Sokol Saratov (loan)	6	(0)
2025–	Dynamo Makhachkala	6	(0)
- * Club domestic league appearances and goals as of 1 November 2026

Nikita Aleksandrovich Karabashev (Russian: Никита Александрович Карабашев; born 30 June 2002) is a Russian football player who plays as a goalkeeper for Dynamo Makhachkala.

== Career ==
Karabashev made his debut in the Russian Premier League for Dynamo Makhachkala on 10 May 2026 in a game against Akhmat Grozny.

== Career statistics ==
As of 1 November 2026

Club	Season	League			Cup		Other		Total	
Club	Season	Division	Apps	Goals	Apps	Goals	Apps	Goals	Apps	Goals
Leningradets	2020–21	Russian Second League	0	0	0	0	—		0	0
Leningradets	2021–22	Russian Second League	0	0	0	0	—		0	0
Leningradets	2022–23	Russian Second League	2	0	0	0	—		2	0
Leningradets	2023–24	Russian First League	27	0	0	0	—		27	0
Leningradets	Total		29	0	0	0	0	0	29	0
Sochi	2024–25	Russian First League	7	0	0	0	—		7	0
Sochi	2025–26	Russian Premier League	0	0	0	0	—		0	0
Sochi	Total		7	0	0	0	0	0	7	0
Sokol Saratov (loan)	2024–25	Russian First League	6	0	0	0	—		6	0
Dynamo Makhachkala	2025–26	Russian Premier League	2	0	1	0	2 (Note: Appearances in relegation play-offs)	0	5	0
Dynamo Makhachkala	2026–27	Russian Premier League	4	0	1	0	—		5	0
Dynamo Makhachkala	Total		6	0	2	0	2	0	10	0
Career total			48	0	2	0	2	0	52	0
