= Denis Bokov =

Russian footballer (born 2005)

Personal information
- Full name: Denis Igorevich Bokov
- Date of birth: 6 October 2005 (age 21)
- Place of birth: Moscow, Russia
- Height: 1.82 m (6 ft 0 in)
- Position: Centre-forward

Team information
- Current team: Ural Yekaterinburg (on loan from Dynamo Moscow)
- Number: 11

Youth career
- 2014–2021: Dynamo Moscow

Senior career*
Years	Team	Apps	(Gls)
2022–	Dynamo Moscow	2	(0)
2022–2025	→ Dynamo-2 Moscow	60	(20)
2025–2026	→ Spartak Kostroma (loan)	13	(0)
2026–	→ Ural Yekaterinburg (loan)	0	(0)

International career^{‡}
2022	Russia U-17	2	(0)
2022	Russia U-18	2	(1)
2023	Russia U-19	1	(0)
2024–	Russia U-21	8	(2)
- * Club domestic league appearances and goals as of 16 May 2026 ‡ National team caps and goals as of 8 September 2025

Denis Igorevich Bokov (Russian: Денис Игоревич Боков; born 6 October 2005) is a Russian football player who plays as a centre-forward for Ural Yekaterinburg on loan from Dynamo Moscow.

== Club career ==
Bokov made his debut in the Russian Premier League for Dynamo Moscow on 25 August 2024 in a game against Krasnodar.

Bokov made his first start and scored his first goal for Dynamo on 28 August 2024 in a Russian Cup 5–1 victory over Krylia Sovetov Samara.

On 18 June 2026, Bokov was loaned to Ural Yekaterinburg for the 2026–27 season.

== Career statistics ==
As of match played 13 August 2025

Appearances and goals by club, season and competition
Club	Season	League			Cup		Other		Total	
Club	Season	Division	Apps	Goals	Apps	Goals	Apps	Goals	Apps	Goals
Dynamo-2 Moscow	2021–22	Russian Second League	6	1	—		—		6	1
Dynamo-2 Moscow	2022–23	Russian Second League	13	3	—		—		13	3
Dynamo-2 Moscow	2023	Russian Second League B	11	2	—		—		11	2
Dynamo-2 Moscow	2024	Russian Second League B	22	12	—		—		22	12
Dynamo-2 Moscow	2024–25	Russian Second League A	6	2	—		—		6	2
Dynamo-2 Moscow	2025–26	Russian Second League A	1	0	—		—		1	0
Dynamo-2 Moscow	Total		59	20	—		—		59	20
Dynamo Moscow	2022–23	Russian Premier League	0	0	0	0	0	0	0	0
Dynamo Moscow	2024–25	Russian Premier League	2	0	1	1	—		3	1
Dynamo Moscow	2025–26	Russian Premier League	0	0	1	0	—		1	0
Dynamo Moscow	Total		2	0	2	1	0	0	4	1
Career total			61	20	2	1	0	0	63	21
