= 2026 Russian Second League Division B =

Russian Second League Division B
- Season: 2026
- Dates: 28 March 2026 – 8 November 2026
- Champions: Spartak Tambov
- Promoted: Sevastopol; Murom; Spartak Tambov; Khimik Dzerzhinsk
- Relegated: Dynamo-2 Makhachkala; Iskra Smolensk; Irkutsk; Arsenal-2 Tula; Kvant Obninsk; Ural-2 Yekaterinburg; Chelyabinsk-2

The 2026 Russian Second League Division B was the fourth season of Russia's fourth-tier football league. The season began on 28 March 2026 and ended on 8 November 2026.

== Overview ==
In the summer of 2023, the Russian Second League was reorganized and split into two tiers - third-tier Russian Second League Division A and fourth-tier Russian Second League Division B. Division B also switched to the spring-to-autumn, March-to-November schedule. 2023 was a transitional half-year season. 2024 season was the first full-length season.

Division B is split into 4 groups, mostly based on geographical location. At the end of the season, four winners of their groups were promoted into the Division B Second Stage Silver Group. Two bottom teams from the Division A First Stage Silver Group were relegated to 2027 Division B.

== Team movement ==
At the end of the 2025 season, Dynamo Stavropol, Zenit-2 St. Petersburg, Dynamo Bryansk and Amkar Perm were promoted to Division A as winners of their Division B groups. Avangard Kursk and Murom were relegated to Division B from Division A.

Kuban-Holding Pavlovskaya, Sochi-2, Kolomna, Znamya Truda Orekhovo-Zuyevo, Uralets-TS Nizhny Tagil and Sokol Kazan were relegated or voluntarily dropped out.

Legion Makhachkala was relocated and renamed to Pobeda Nizhny Novgorod, also moving from Zone 1 to Zone 4. Rodina-M Moscow was renamed to Rodina-3 Moscow. Dynamo St. Petersburg moved from Group 3 to Group 2, Saturn Ramenskoye moved from Group 2 to Group 3, Volna Nizhny Novgorod Oblast moved from Group 4 to Group 3.

Spartak Nalchik, Dynamo-2 Makhachkala, Yenisey-2 Krasnoyarsk, Kvant Obninsk and Nosta Novotroitsk, which finished the 2025 season in relegation spots, were kept in the league because of the other teams dropping out or moving zones. That was the second consecutive occasion that happened for Dynamo-2, Yenisey-2 and Kvant.

New teams were Zarya Lugansk, Kyzyltash Bakhchisaray, Neftyanik Izberbash, PSK Dinskaya, Shakhtyor, Iskra Smolensk, Shumbrat Saransk, Izhevsk (all promoted from lower-level amateur leagues) and Chayka-M Peschanokopskoye (reserve team of a Russian First League club).

== Group 1 ==
Group 1 included 15 teams that played each other twice, home and away, from 28 March 2026 to 30 October 2026. The group winner was promoted to the Division A Second Stage Silver Group, the bottom team was relegated from Division B.

FC PSK Dinskaya dropped out of the league on 17 June 2026 for financial reasons. As they played less than half of their scheduled games, all their results have been discarded.

Pos	Team	Pld	W	D	L	GF	GA	GD	Pts	Qualification
1	Sevastopol (C, P)	28	21	3	4	56	23	+33	66	Promotion to the Division A Second Stage Silver Group
2	Shakhtyor Donetsk	28	18	5	5	52	25	+27	59	
3	Rostov-2	28	17	6	5	54	25	+29	57	
4	Pobeda Khasavyurt	28	15	3	10	51	39	+12	48	
5	Rubin Yalta	28	13	7	8	41	31	+10	46	
6	Druzhba Maykop	28	13	7	8	36	32	+4	46	
7	Kyzyltash Bakhchisaray	28	13	5	10	48	38	+10	44	
8	Nart Cherkessk	28	13	4	11	39	28	+11	43	
9	Spartak Nalchik	28	10	8	10	38	33	+5	38	
10	Zarya Lugansk	28	8	6	14	37	40	−3	30	
11	Neftyanik Izberbash	28	8	3	17	26	66	−40	27	
12	Astrakhan	28	6	7	15	29	44	−15	25	
13	Angusht Nazran	28	6	5	17	16	35	−19	23	
14	Chayka-M Peschanokopskoye	28	6	2	20	30	66	−36	20	
15	Dynamo-2 Makhachkala (R)	28	4	7	17	23	51	−28	19	Relegation to the Russian Amateur Football League

Updated to match(es) played on completed. Source: Soccerway
(C) Champions; (P) Promoted; (R) Relegated

===== Top goalscorers =====
Rank	Player	Club	Goals
1	Dmitry Ivanov	Sevastopol	14
2	Mikhail Zakharov	Zarya	11
2	Magomed Ibragimov	Spartak Nalchik	11
2	Kirill Cheburakov	Rostov-2	11
5	Ratmir Mashezov	Nart	10

== Group 2 ==
Group 2 included 15 teams that played each other twice, home and away, from 28 March 2026 to 1 November 2026. The group winner was promoted to the Division A Second Stage Silver Group, the bottom two teams were relegated from Division B.

Pos	Team	Pld	W	D	L	GF	GA	GD	Pts	
1	Murom (C, P)	28	19	4	5	50	21	+29	61	Promotion to the Division A Second Stage Silver Group
2	Dynamo St. Petersburg	28	17	8	3	45	15	+30	59	
3	Chertanovo Moscow	28	16	7	5	48	23	+25	55	
4	Luki-Energiya Velikiye Luki	28	14	8	6	39	26	+13	50	
5	Baltika-2 Kaliningrad	28	14	4	10	46	37	+9	46	
6	Kosmos Dolgoprudny	28	14	4	10	37	37	0	46	
7	Tver	28	12	5	11	45	39	+6	41	
8	Torpedo Vladimir	28	10	7	11	24	33	−9	37	
9	Cherepovets	28	11	4	13	32	42	−10	37	
10	Spartak-2 Moscow	28	8	7	13	33	40	−7	31	
11	Dynamo Vologda	28	8	6	14	32	36	−4	30	
12	Zvezda Saint Petersburg	28	7	9	12	34	49	−15	30	
13	Yenisey-2 Krasnoyarsk	28	8	4	16	32	56	−24	28	
14	Iskra Smolensk	28	6	7	15	28	57	−29	25	Relegation to the Russian Amateur Football League
15	Irkutsk (Note: FC Irkutsk dropped out of the competition on 22 July 2026. As they played half of their games by that time, the results of those games will remain in the table, and all of their remaining games will be awarded to their opponents without changing their goal difference. De-facto, they played only 13 games as they did not arrive to their 7th game away against Murom, but that game was awarded to Murom before Irkutsk fully dropped out of the league and thus counted as "played" for the regulations purposes.)	28	3	2	23	11	25	−14	11	Relegation to the Russian Amateur Football League

Source: Soccerway
(C) Champions; (P) Promoted

===== Top goalscorers =====
Rank	Player	Club	Goals
1	Danila Yezhkov	Dynamo St. Petersburg	13
2	Ruslan Bolov	Murom	12
3	Ilya Antsiferov	Cherepovets	11
4	Gadzhimurad Abdullayev	Murom	10
5	Vladislav Sokolov	Iskra	9
5	Oleg Trofimov	Kosmos	9

== Group 3 ==
Group 3 included 16 teams that played each other twice, home and away, from 28 March 2026 to 31 October 2026. The group winner was promoted to the Division A Second Stage Silver Group, the bottom two teams were relegated from Division B.

Pos	Team	Pld	W	D	L	GF	GA	GD	Pts	Promotion or relegation
1	Spartak Tambov (C, P)	30	22	5	3	52	15	+37	71	Promotion to the Division A Second Stage Silver Group
2	Volna Nizhny Novgorod Oblast	30	21	5	4	55	21	+34	68	
3	Salyut Belgorod	30	19	4	7	64	27	+37	61	
4	Ryazan	30	16	10	4	52	21	+31	58	
5	Metallurg Lipetsk	30	16	6	8	54	32	+22	54	
6	Saturn Ramenskoye	30	15	6	9	55	44	+11	51	
7	Rodina-3 Moscow	30	14	5	11	53	45	+8	47	
8	Shumbrat Saransk	30	13	7	10	48	39	+9	46	
9	Oryol	30	9	7	14	31	46	−15	34	
10	Avangard Kursk	30	8	10	12	33	46	−13	34	
11	Strogino Moscow	30	9	5	16	38	54	−16	32	
12	SKA-Khabarovsk-2	30	9	4	17	43	56	−13	31	
13	Zenit Penza	30	7	6	17	28	58	−30	27	
14	Rotor-2 Volgograd	30	6	5	19	20	42	−22	23	
15	Arsenal-2 Tula (R)	30	3	11	16	22	52	−30	20	Relegation to the Russian Amateur Football League
16	Kvant Obninsk (R)	30	2	6	22	30	80	−50	12	Relegation to the Russian Amateur Football League

Source: Soccerway
(C) Champions; (P) Promoted; (R) Relegated

===== Top goalscorers =====
Rank	Player	Club	Goals
1	Gocha Gogrichiani	Volna	14
1	Dmitry Kuptsov	Spartak	14
3	Yevgeny Yevgenyev	Ryazan	12
3	Ilya Vinnikov	Salyut	12
5	Nikita Chelyshev	Strogino	11
5	Stepan Burdakov	SKA-Khabarovsk-2	11

== Group 4 ==
Group 4 included 12 teams.

In the first stage, 12 teams played each other twice, home and away, from 5 April 2026 to 23 August 2026. At the end of the first stage, top 6 teams qualified for the second stage subgroup 4A, and the remaining 6 qualified for the second stage subgroup 4B. All the first stage results were included in the initial subgroup 4A and 4B standings. The teams in subgroups 4A and 4B played each other team in their respective subgroups home and away, for 10 additional games.

The winner of subgroup 4A was promoted to the Division A Second Stage Silver Group, the bottom two teams of subgroup 4B were relegated from Division B.

=== First stage ===
Pos	Team	Pld	W	D	L	GF	GA	GD	Pts	Promotion or relegation
1	Khimik Dzerzhinsk	22	18	2	2	57	16	+41	56	Qualification for the Second Stage Subgroup 4A
2	KDV Tomsk	22	17	2	3	40	20	+20	53	Qualification for the Second Stage Subgroup 4A
3	Pobeda Nizhny Novgorod	22	13	4	5	51	33	+18	43	Qualification for the Second Stage Subgroup 4A
4	Akron-2 Tolyatti	22	10	2	10	46	34	+12	32	Qualification for the Second Stage Subgroup 4A
5	Krylia Sovetov-2 Samara	22	6	9	7	25	26	−1	27	Qualification for the Second Stage Subgroup 4A
6	Dynamo Barnaul	22	7	5	10	31	50	−19	26	Qualification for the Second Stage Subgroup 4A
7	Orenburg-2	22	6	8	8	31	35	−4	26	Qualification for the Second Stage Subgroup 4B
8	Izhevsk	22	5	8	9	30	32	−2	23	Qualification for the Second Stage Subgroup 4B
9	Ural-2 Yekaterinburg	22	5	7	10	34	44	−10	22	Qualification for the Second Stage Subgroup 4B
10	Rubin-2 Kazan	22	4	8	10	25	35	−10	20	Qualification for the Second Stage Subgroup 4B
11	Nosta Novotroitsk	22	4	6	12	20	48	−28	18	Qualification for the Second Stage Subgroup 4B
12	Chelyabinsk-2	22	4	5	13	19	36	−17	17	Qualification for the Second Stage Subgroup 4B

Source: Soccerway

=== Second stage ===
==== Subgroup 4A ====
Pos	Team	Pld	W	D	L	GF	GA	GD	Pts	Promotion or relegation
1	Khimik Dzerzhinsk (C, P)	32	26	2	4	80	25	+55	80	Promotion to the Division A Second Stage Silver Group
2	KDV Tomsk	32	22	2	8	53	36	+17	68	
3	Akron-2 Tolyatti	32	16	3	13	71	48	+23	51	
4	Pobeda Nizhny Novgorod	32	15	5	12	62	60	+2	50	
5	Dynamo Barnaul	32	11	7	14	43	64	−21	40	
6	Krylia Sovetov-2 Samara	32	9	9	14	37	42	−5	36	

Source: Soccerway
(C) Champions; (P) Promoted

===== Top goalscorers =====
Rank	Player	Club	Goals
1	Artur Maksimchuk	Pobeda	27
2	Ilya Gruznov	Khimik	20
3	Ilya Kozhukhar	Pobeda	17
4	Maksim Kholodov	Akron-2	16
5	Roni Mikhaylovsky	Pobeda	10
5	Danylo Kondrakov	KDV	10

==== Subgroup 4B ====
Pos	Team	Pld	W	D	L	GF	GA	GD	Pts	Promotion or relegation
7	Orenburg-2	32	11	11	10	51	48	+3	44	
8	Izhevsk	32	10	9	13	44	45	−1	39	
9	Rubin-2 Kazan	32	9	10	13	44	47	−3	37	
10	Nosta Novotroitsk	32	10	7	15	34	60	−26	37	
11	Ural-2 Yekaterinburg	32	7	9	16	44	63	−19	30	Relegation to the Russian Amateur Football League
12	Chelyabinsk-2	32	6	6	20	25	50	−25	24	Relegation to the Russian Amateur Football League

Source: Soccerway

===== Top goalscorers =====
Rank	Player	Club	Goals
1	Yegor Totsky	Izhevsk	22
2	Emil Galimullin	Rubin-2	13
3	Pavel Satuchin	Ural-2	8
3	Dmitry Cherkasov	Orenburg-2	8
5	Nikita Khrisanfov	Ural-2	7
5	Stanislav Bondarenko	Ural-2	7
5	Adel Gaynulin	Rubin-2	7
5	Yaroslav Frolov	Orenburg-2	7
5	Maksim Yurin	Rubin-2	7
5	Arseny Vayner	Nosta	7

== Final Four ==
On 27 October 2026, the league announced they will hold a Final Four tournament in Moscow, with four group winners participating. The semifinals were played on 6 November and the final and the 3rd-place game were played on 8 November, with semifinal pairs determined by a draw.

The final winner was crowned the Winner of Division B and awarded a special trophy. The Final Four tournament did not have effect on promotion, which will happen as per existing regulations.

=== Semifinals ===
6 November 2026

Spartak Tambov	1–0	Murom
Sergeyev 87'	Report

Cosmos-Arena, Moscow
Attendance: 87
Referee: Aleksandr Perepelkov
6 November 2026

Sevastopol	3–2	Khimik Dzerzhinsk
Maksim Suprun 39'; Artyom Stepanovich 71'; Amet Dugu 84'	Report	Kirill Myrzakov 45'; Ruslan Gavrilov 82'

Cosmos-Arena, Moscow
Attendance: 257
Referee: Pavel Klipikov

=== Third-place game ===
8 November 2026

Murom	0–2	Khimik Dzerzhinsk
	Report	Dmitry Veber 45+1'; Roman Izotov 76'

Cosmos-Arena, Moscow
Attendance: 123
Referee: Vladislav Shipkov

=== Final ===
8 November 2026

Spartak Tambov	1–0	Sevastopol
Daniil Gurchenko 21'	Report

Cosmos-Arena, Moscow
Attendance: 392
Referee: Pavel Polyanichko
