= FC Stroitel Kamensk-Shakhtinsky =

Russian football club

Stroitel Kamensk-Shakhtinsky
- Full name: Football Club Stroitel Kamensk-Shakhtinsky
- Founded: 1978; 48 years ago
- Dissolved: 2025; 1 year ago
- Ground: Novocolor Arena
- Capacity: 550
- Chairman: Yevgeny Mikhaylusov
- Manager: Oleksiy Korobchenko
- 2024: Russian Second League, Division B, Group 1, 7th
- Website: fk-stroitel.ru

FC Stroitel Kamensk-Shakhtinsky (Russian: «Строитель» (Каменск-Шахтинский)) was a Russian football team from Kamensk-Shakhtinsky.

The club was reestablished in 2016. On 16 February 2024, the club was licensed for the Russian Second League Division B. It was assigned to Group 1. In February 2025, the club was purchased by a new owner Denis Shtengelov (the founder of a food company KDV-Group), rebranded and relocated to Tomsk as FC KDV Tomsk. The town was previously represented in national competitions by FC Progress Kamensk-Shakhtinsky.
