= 2024 Russian Second League Division B =

Russian Second League Division B
- Season: 2024
- Dates: 30 March 2024 – 16 November 2024

The 2024 Russian Second League Division B was the second season of Russia's fourth-tier football league. The season began on 30 March 2024 and ended on 16 November 2024. There was a three-week break in July after half of the games had been played.

== Overview ==
In the summer of 2023, the Russian Second League was reorganized and split into two tiers - third-tier Russian Second League Division A and fourth-tier Russian Second League Division B. Division B also switched to the spring-to-autumn, March-to-November schedule. 2023 was a transitional half-year season. 2024 season was the first full-length season.

Division B is split into 4 groups, mostly based on geographical location. At the end of the year, four winners of their groups were promoted into the Division A Second Stage Silver Group. Four bottom teams from the Division A First Stage Silver Group were relegated to 2025 Division B.

== Team movement ==
At the end of the 2023 season, Mashuk-KMV Pyatigorsk, Khimik Dzerzhinsk, Kaluga and Torpedo Miass were promoted to Division A as winners of their Division B groups. Forte Taganrog, Amkar Perm, Chertanovo Moscow and Salyut Belgorod were relegated to Division B from Division A.

Torpedo-2 and Peresvet Domodedovo were relegated from Division B. SKA Rostov-on-Don and Zorkiy Krasnogorsk voluntarily dropped out. Sakhalinets Moscow and Khimik-Avgust Vurnary dissolved their professional squads. Krasnoye Znamya Noginsk failed licensing for the season.

Elektron Veliky Novgorod moved to Nizhny Novgorod and was renamed to Volna Nizhny Novgorod Oblast.

Pobeda Khasavyurt, Dynamo Stavropol, Kolomna, Orenburg-2 and Akron-2 Tolyatti, which finished the 2023 season in relegation spots, were kept in the league because of the other teams dropping out.

New teams were Angusht Nazran, Lada-Tolyatti, Nart Cherkessk, Oryol, Sokol Kazan and Stroitel Kamensk-Shakhtinsky (promoted from the Russian Amateur Football League), Krylia Sovetov-2 Samara, Pari NN-2 Nizhny Novgorod, Rostov-2 and Spartak-2 Moscow (farm clubs of the Russian Premier League teams).

== Group 1 ==
Group 1 included 17 teams that played each other twice, home and away, from 30 March 2024 to 16 November 2024. The opening games that were initially scheduled for 23 March 2024 were postponed due to the Crocus City Hall attack. The group winner were promoted to the Division A Second Stage Silver Group, the bottom two teams were qualified to be relegated from Division B.

Pos	Team	Pld	W	D	L	GF	GA	GD	Pts	Qualification
1	Forte Taganrog	32	22	5	5	68	30	+38	71	Promotion to the Division A Second Stage Silver Group
2	Rubin Yalta	32	20	4	8	48	26	+22	64	
3	Dynamo Stavropol	32	18	9	5	54	31	+23	63	
4	Legion Makhachkala	32	18	6	8	57	26	+31	60	
5	Rostov-2	32	19	3	10	57	33	+24	60	
6	Sevastopol	32	17	7	8	47	30	+17	58	
7	Stroitel Kamensk-Shakhtinsky (Note: Stroitel was purchased by a new owner in February 2025 and relocated to Tomsk as FC KDV Tomsk.)	32	13	9	10	44	34	+10	48	
8	Astrakhan	32	14	5	13	40	42	−2	47	
9	Nart Cherkessk	32	13	5	14	43	47	−4	44	
10	Druzhba Maykop	32	13	3	16	41	42	−1	42	
11	Angusht Nazran	32	8	14	10	22	27	−5	38	
12	Kuban-Holding Pavlovskaya	32	9	10	13	29	37	−8	37	
13	Spartak Nalchik	32	10	7	15	47	50	−3	37	
14	Biolog-Novokubansk (Note: Biolog-Novokubansk was dissolved in early 2025.)	32	8	6	18	41	56	−15	30	Dissolved after the season
15	Pobeda Khasavyurt	32	7	9	16	36	49	−13	30	
16	Alania-2 Vladikavkaz	32	4	5	23	24	87	−63	17	Relegation to the Russian Amateur Football League
17	Dynamo-2 Makhachkala (Note: Dynamo-2 was not relegated and was included in the 2025 Second League Division B.)	32	3	5	24	19	70	−51	14	

Source: Second League Division B (in Russian), Soccerway

=== Top goalscorers ===
Rank	Player	Club	Goals
1	Magomed Abakarov	Forte Taganrog	17
1	Vadim Zubavlenko	Rubin Yalta	17
3	Aleksandr Olenev	Legion Makhachkala	14
3	Alan Khachirov	Spartak Nalchik	14
5	Makhach Abdulkhamidov	Dynamo Stavropol	12
6	Islam Tlupov	Spartak Nalchik	11
6	Bekkhan Aliyev	Angusht Nazran	11
8	Anar Panayev	Legion Makhachkala	10
8	Gadzhimurad Abdullayev	Druzhba Maykop	10
8	Stanislav Ruban	Stroitel Kamensk-Shakhtinsky	10

== Group 2 ==
Group 2 included 16 teams that played each other twice, home and away, from 6 April 2024 to 3 November 2024. The group winner were promoted to the Division A Second Stage Silver Group, the bottom two teams were relegated from Division B.

Pos	Team	Pld	W	D	L	GF	GA	GD	Pts	Promotion or relegation
1	Dynamo-2 Moscow	30	22	4	4	66	28	+38	70	Promotion to the Division A Second Stage Silver Group
2	Spartak-2 Moscow	30	19	5	6	67	33	+34	62	
3	Leon Saturn Ramenskoye (Note: Leon Saturn was renamed back to Saturn at the end of 2024.)	30	17	7	6	68	43	+25	58	
4	Irkutsk	30	17	6	7	43	35	+8	57	
5	Chertanovo Moscow	30	17	4	9	54	38	+16	55	
6	Zenit-2 Saint Petersburg	30	14	9	7	45	30	+15	51	
7	Dynamo Vologda	30	15	6	9	45	31	+14	51	
8	Baltika-BFU Kaliningrad (Note: The team was renamed to Baltika-2 in January 2025.)	30	14	8	8	50	45	+5	50	
9	Dynamo Saint Petersburg	30	11	6	13	54	50	+4	39	
10	Torpedo Vladimir	30	11	6	13	43	40	+3	39	
11	Rodina-M Moscow	30	9	7	14	51	48	+3	34	
12	Znamya Truda Orekhovo-Zuyevo	30	9	4	17	27	52	−25	31	
13	Luki-Energiya Velikiye Luki	30	7	7	16	24	41	−17	28	
14	Tver	30	6	7	17	30	57	−27	25	
15	Yenisey-2 Krasnoyarsk (Note: Yenisey-2 was not relegated and was included in the 2025 Second League Division B.)	30	3	5	22	26	66	−40	14	
16	Zvezda Saint Petersburg (Note: Zvezda was not relegated and was included in the 2025 Second League Division B.)	30	1	5	24	24	80	−56	8	

Source: Second League Division B (in Russian), Soccerway

=== Top goalscorers ===
Rank	Player	Club	Goals
1	Vitaly Karpenko	Spartak-2 Moscow	18
2	Anton Betyuzhnov	Dynamo Vologda	12
2	Denis Bokov	Dynamo-2 Moscow	12
2	Artyom Bykovsky	Spartak-2 Moscow	12
5	Stanislav Basyrov	Leon Saturn Ramenskoye	11

== Group 3 ==
Group 3 included 15 teams that played each other twice, home and away, from 7 April 2024 to 3 November 2024. The group winner were promoted to the Division A Second Stage Silver Group, the bottom two teams were relegated from Division B.

Pos	Team	Pld	W	D	L	GF	GA	GD	Pts	Promotion or relegation
1	Dynamo Vladivostok	28	20	3	5	42	17	+25	63	Promotion to the Division A Second Stage Silver Group
2	Kosmos Dolgoprudny	28	16	6	6	45	23	+22	54	
3	Kompozit Pavlovsky Posad (Note: Kompozit has been merged into FC Znamya Truda Orekhovo-Zuyevo in 2025.)	28	16	6	6	59	40	+19	54	
4	Salyut Belgorod	28	13	9	6	49	34	+15	48	
5	Spartak Tambov	28	12	8	8	37	28	+9	44	
6	Khimki-M	28	13	5	10	37	34	+3	44	
7	Sakhalin Yuzhno-Sakhalinsk (Note: Sakhalin was dissolved at the end of the year.)	28	12	6	10	29	24	+5	42	Dissolved after the season
8	Zenit Penza	28	10	7	11	34	35	−1	37	
9	Ryazan	28	9	8	11	33	31	+2	35	
10	Oryol	28	10	5	13	34	32	+2	35	
11	Strogino Moscow	28	9	4	15	24	38	−14	31	
12	Arsenal-2 Tula	28	9	4	15	31	40	−9	31	
13	SKA-Khabarovsk-2	28	7	6	15	38	50	−12	27	
14	Kolomna (Note: FC Kolomna was not relegated and was included in the 2025 Second League Division B.)	28	5	6	17	22	56	−34	21	
15	Kvant Obninsk (Note: FC Kvant Obnisnk was not relegated and was included in the 2025 Second League Division B.)	28	4	7	17	19	51	−32	19	

Source: Second League Division B (in Russian), Soccerway

=== Top goalscorers ===
Rank	Player	Club	Goals
1	Andrei Chasovskikh	Spartak Tambov	12
1	Nikolai Boyarkin	Salyut Belgorod	12
1	Kirill Pomeshkin	Kosmos Dolgoprudny	12
1	Oleg Trofimov	Khimki-M	12
5	Astemir Khashkulov	SKA-Khabarovsk-2	11

== Group 4 ==
Group 4 included 14 teams that played each other twice, home and away, from 13 April 2024 to 19 October 2024. The group winner were promoted to the Division A Second Stage Silver Group, the bottom two teams were relegated from Division B.

Pos	Team	Pld	W	D	L	GF	GA	GD	Pts	Promotion or relegation
1	Dynamo Kirov	26	17	6	3	52	19	+33	57	Promotion to the Division A Second Stage Silver Group
2	Amkar Perm	26	16	7	3	35	15	+20	55	
3	Rubin-2 Kazan	26	12	10	4	38	18	+20	46	
4	Sokol Kazan	26	13	6	7	49	35	+14	45	
5	Volna Nizhny Novgorod Oblast	26	13	4	9	41	31	+10	43	
6	Krylia Sovetov-2 Samara	26	10	10	6	34	28	+6	40	
7	Ural-2 Yekaterinburg	26	9	8	9	31	24	+7	35	
8	Uralets-TS Nizhny Tagil	26	9	5	12	29	36	−7	32	
9	Lada-Tolyatti (Note: Lada-Tolyatti dropped out of professional football for financial reasons.)	26	8	5	13	30	36	−6	29	Relegation to the Russian Amateur Football League
10	Dynamo Barnaul	26	7	6	13	29	43	−14	27	
11	Nosta Novotroitsk	26	6	7	13	27	39	−12	25	
12	Orenburg-2	26	6	7	13	26	44	−18	25	
13	Akron-2 Tolyatti (Note: Akron-2 was not relegated and was included in the 2025 Second League Division B.)	26	6	4	16	21	41	−20	22	
14	Pari NN-2 Nizhny Novgorod (Note: Pari NN-2 was dissolved by the parent club at the conclusion of the season.)	26	4	7	15	20	53	−33	19	Dissolved after the season

Source: Second League Division B (in Russian), Soccerway

=== Top goalscorers ===
Rank	Player	Club	Goals
1	Ilya Yurchenko	Amkar Perm	13
1	Daniil Motorin	Rubin-2 Kazan	13
3	Ilya Kozhukhar	Dynamo Kirov	12
4	Daniil Nagovitsin	Dynamo Kirov	11
5	Dmitry Usov	Orenburg-2	9
