= FC Salyut Belgorod =

Russian football club

Salyut
- Full name: Football Club; Salyut Belgorod
- Founded: 1960; 66 years ago
- Ground: Spartak Stadium, Stary Oskol; Salyut temporarily plays outside of Belgorod due to the Russo-Ukrainian war
- Capacity: 300
- Chairman: Aleksandr Kokorev
- Manager: Andrey Reprintsev
- League: Russian Second League, Division B, Group 3
- 2026: 3rd
- Website: fcsalyut.ru
Home colours	Away colours

FC Salyut Belgorod is a Russian association football club based in Belgorod. They play in the fourth-tier Russian Second League Division B.

== History ==
=== Naming history ===
The club was founded in 1960 and has been known as:

- Tsementnik (Cement Worker) (1960–63)
- Spartak (1964–69)
- Salyut (Salute) (1970–91, 1993–95, 2010–14, 2018–)
- Energomash (Power Machine Building) (1991–92)
- Salyut-YUKOS (1996–99)
- Salyut-Energiya (2000–09)

=== Overview ===
Tsementnik played in the Class B in 1960 and 1961. After the team became the part of Spartak sports society, they re-entered the competition in 1964. In 1968 Spartak finished third in the finals of Class B and were promoted to the Class A, Group 2. After the reorganization of the leagues in 1971 Salyut played in the Soviet Second League until 1989. In 1990 and 1991 the team played in the Soviet Second League B.

In 1992 Energomash entered the newly formed Russian First League and were relegated. In 1993, the team finished first in Zone 2 of the Russian Second League but were not promoted. In 1995 Salyut were relegated from the Second League, but returned immediately after topping their zone in the Third League. Salyut-YUKOS were relegated again after another three years in the Second Division (1997–1999), this time to the amateur league (KFK). In 2000, they won the promotion back to the professional football. In 2001–2005 Salyut-Energia were among the leaders of the Second Division, finishing no lower than fifth in their zone. In 2005, the team finished first and were promoted to the First Division. The team finished 17th in 2010 and relegated to Second Division.

During winter break 2013–2014, Salyut experienced huge financial difficulties. Almost all contracts with first-team players were terminated by mutual consent. As a result, on 14 February 2014 club officially withdrew from competition in Russian National Football League.

Belgorod was represented professionally by FC Energomash Belgorod from 2015 to 2018.

Before the 2018–19 season, Salyut was revived and entered the third-tier Russian Professional Football League.

== Current squad ==
As of 13 September 2026, according to the Second League website.

Note: Flags indicate national team as defined under FIFA eligibility rules; some limited exceptions apply. Players may hold more than one non-FIFA nationality.

No.	Pos.	Nation	Player
1	GK	RUS	Artyom Tsygulev
6	MF	RUS	Andrei Ishutin
7	MF	RUS	Aleksandr Kanishchev
8	MF	RUS	Nikolai Boyarkin
9	MF	RUS	Vladislav Panin
10	FW	RUS	Daniil Borisov (on loan from Mashuk-KMV)
11	FW	RUS	Aleksandr Kolesnikov
13	DF	RUS	Vladislav Sergeyev
17	MF	RUS	Stanislav Bukatov
18	MF	RUS	Ilya Vinnikov
19	MF	RUS	Dmitri Shilov
21	MF	RUS	Sergey Gayduk
22	DF	RUS	Andrey Ivanteyev

No.	Pos.	Nation	Player
23	MF	RUS	Dmitry Matyushchenko
28	FW	RUS	Vladislav Faskhutdinov
31	GK	RUS	Denis Gnedoy
37	MF	RUS	Dmitry Malykhin
45	DF	RUS	Vladislav Shchekin
51	GK	RUS	Vladislav Zernayev
67	DF	RUS	Nikita Ponomaryov
69	DF	RUS	Yevgeny Khrapuchenko
77	MF	RUS	Muslim Nabiyev
90	FW	RUS	Maksim Kutovoy
95	DF	RUS	Aleksandr Krikunenko
96	DF	RUS	Andrey Tsorn
99	MF	RUS	David Gagua (on loan from Tekstilshchik Ivanovo)
