= FC Sochi-2 =

Russian football club

- Full name: Football Club Sochi-2
- Founded: 2025
- League: N/A
- 2025: Russian Second League, Division B, Group 1, 9th
- Website: https://pfcsochi.ru/

FC Sochi-2 (Russian: ФК «Сочи-2») is a Russian football team from Sochi. It is the reserve team for PFC Sochi.

The club was established in 2025 and was entered into the Russian fourth-tier Russian Second League Division B. On 27 December 2025, the parent club announced that the team will not play on professional level in 2026.
