= FC Pari NN-2 Nizhny Novgorod =

Russian football club

- Full name: Football Club Pari NN-2 Nizhny Novgorod
- Founded: 2024
- Dissolved: 2024
- Chairman: David Melik-Guseynov
- 2024: Russian Second League, Division B, Group 4, 14th
- Website: https://www.fcnn.ru/

FC Pari NN-2 Nizhny Novgorod (Russian: ФК «Пари НН-2» (Нижний Новгород)) was a Russian football team from Nizhny Novgorod. It was the farm club for FC Pari Nizhny Novgorod.

The club was established in January 2024.

On 20 February 2024, the club was licensed for the Russian Second League Division B. It was assigned to Group 4. The club was dissolved at the end of the season.
