= FC Chelyabinsk-2 =

Russian football club

- Full name: Football Club Chelyabinsk-2
- Founded: 2025
- Ground: Tsentralny Stadium
- Capacity: 15,000
- Manager: Vitaly Korkin
- League: Russian Second League, Division B, Group 4
- 2026: 12th
- Website: fc-chel.ru

FC Chelyabinsk-2 (Russian: ФК «Челябинск-2») is a Russian football team from Chelyabinsk. It is the reserve team for FC Chelyabinsk.

== Club history ==
The club was established in 2025 and was entered into the Russian fourth-tier Russian Second League Division B.

== Current squad ==
As of 14 September 2026, according to the Second League website.

Note: Flags indicate national team as defined under FIFA eligibility rules; some limited exceptions apply. Players may hold more than one non-FIFA nationality.

No.	Pos.	Nation	Player
5	DF	RUS	Bulat Gatin
9	MF	RUS	Nikita Zyryanov
12	MF	RUS	Aleksandr Novosad
13	DF	RUS	Artyom Tushin
16	GK	RUS	Aleksandr Melezhechkin
23	DF	RUS	Bogdan Rogochy
27	DF	RUS	Ilya Gribakin
31	GK	RUS	Mark Pereverzev
33	MF	RUS	Denis Pokotylo
39	DF	RUS	Andrey Bolshakov
44	DF	RUS	Igor Rusyayev
47	MF	RUS	Vladimir Orlikov
51	DF	RUS	Konstantin Arestov
52	FW	RUS	Nikita Plotnikov
53	FW	RUS	Tikhon Orlov
55	MF	RUS	Georgy Borisov
56	MF	RUS	Daniil Bukreyev
57	GK	RUS	Timofey Shlyakhtichenko
65	DF	RUS	Aleksandr Konyushenko

No.	Pos.	Nation	Player
67	FW	RUS	Aleksandr Pashkov
68	MF	RUS	Mark Kaptinar
71	FW	RUS	Vsevolod Buradzhiyev
74	MF	RUS	Yefim Stanislavchuk
76	MF	RUS	Nikolay Kozlov
78	FW	RUS	Artyom Kirichenko
79	MF	RUS	Ilya Vershinin
80	DF	RUS	Artyom Permyakov
81	GK	RUS	Aleksandr Suvorov
82	DF	RUS	Artyom Ignatyev
83	DF	RUS	Yegor Videneyev
84	DF	RUS	Denis Firsov
85	MF	RUS	Danil Shageyev
89	MF	RUS	Ilya Yurin
90	DF	RUS	Daniil Bakhvalov
92	MF	RUS	Dmitry Yudin
95	MF	RUS	Denis Bratchikov
97	FW	RUS	Aleksandr Chemasov
98	DF	RUS	Nikita Shepelev
