= FC Akron-2 Tolyatti =

Akron-2 Tolyatti
- Full name: Football Club Akron-2 Tolyatti
- Founded: 2023
- Ground: Kristall Stadium, Zhigulevsk
- Capacity: 3,010
- Chairman: Aleksey Vlasov
- Manager: Sergei Vakhteyev
- League: Russian Second League; Division B Group 4
- 2026: 3rd
- Website: fcakron.ru

FC Akron-2 Tolyatti (Russian: ФК Акрон-2 Тольятти) is a Russian football club based in Tolyatti. It is the farm club for FC Akron Tolyatti.

For the 2023–24 season, the club was admitted to the newly organized fourth-tier Russian Second League Division B.

Most of the squad is taken from the senior ages of the Konoplyov football academy which is affiliated with Akron.

They finished the 2023 Russian Second League Division B season in the last place of their group with no wins and just 3 draws in their 16 games. Nevertheless, they were licensed for the 2024 season.

== Current squad ==
As of 13 September 2026, according to the Second League website.

Note: Flags indicate national team as defined under FIFA eligibility rules; some limited exceptions apply. Players may hold more than one non-FIFA nationality.

No.	Pos.	Nation	Player
16	GK	RUS	Matvey Bezrogov
18	MF	RUS	Nikita Bazilevsky
26	MF	RUS	Nikolay Kobylin
33	FW	RUS	Maksim Kholodov
39	FW	RUS	Nazar Makeyev
43	DF	RUS	Kirill Goryachev
45	MF	RUS	Ramazan Sovmiz
46	FW	RUS	Daniil Smetanchuk
47	DF	RUS	Yegor Vedernikov
48	MF	RUS	Pavel Gustinovich
51	FW	RUS	Ruslan Metkalov
52	MF	RUS	Danila Lebedev
53	DF	RUS	Ivan Kozhokin
54	MF	RUS	Kirill Omelchenko
55	DF	RUS	Aleksandr Popov
56	DF	BLR	Stanislav Kazmerchuk
57	DF	RUS	Sevastyan Kachura
58	FW	RUS	Dmitry Alekseyev
61	GK	RUS	Dmitry Vranitsyn
62	MF	RUS	Batyrby Chermit
63	DF	RUS	Tamerlan Kuzmenko
64	FW	RUS	Ivan Sarayev

No.	Pos.	Nation	Player
65	FW	RUS	Semyon Zelenov
66	DF	BLR	Konstantin Tarnolitsky
67	MF	RUS	Nikita Platon
68	DF	RUS	Eduard Martirosyan
69	FW	RUS	Arseni Dmitriyev
70	FW	RUS	Sergey Novikov
72	DF	RUS	Marat Khametov
73	DF	RUS	Ralif Latypov
74	FW	RUS	Yakov Yeshkin
75	MF	RUS	Vyacheslav Vinnikov
76	FW	RUS	Timofey Blokhin
79	DF	RUS	Maksim Mamashev
80	MF	RUS	Fyodor Fenin
81	MF	RUS	Kirill Bazhukhin
85	DF	RUS	Maksim Kondakov
88	GK	RUS	Vitali Gudiyev
89	MF	RUS	Denis Popenkov
90	FW	RUS	Aleksandr Morozov
94	MF	RUS	Vyacheslav Dobrorodov
95	GK	RUS	Artyom Grigoryev
96	GK	RUS	Vladislav Postrigan
98	GK	RUS	Roman Volochay
