= 2022–23 Russian Cup =

2022–23 Fonbet Russian Cup

Tournament details
- Country: Russia
- Teams: 103

Final positions
- Champions: CSKA Moscow (7th title)
- Runners-up: Krasnodar

Tournament statistics
- Matches played: 160
- Goals scored: 412 (2.58 per match)
- Attendance: 902,160 (5,639 per match)
- Top goal scorer(s): Jhon Córdoba (7 goals)
- All statistics correct as of 11 June 2023.

The 2022–23 Russian Cup is the 31st season of the Russian football knockout tournament since the dissolution of the Soviet Union. The competition started on 16 August 2022 and concluded on 11 June 2023.

The winner of the cup would normally gain entry into the 2023–24 UEFA Europa League; however, on 28 February 2022, Russian football clubs were suspended from FIFA & UEFA international competitions until further notice due to the Russo-Ukrainian War.

== Representation of clubs by league ==
- Russian Premier League (1): 16 clubs
- Russian First League (2): 17 clubs (without 1 farm team)
- Russian Second League (3): 59 clubs (without 13 farm teams)
- Amateur leagues:
  - Third division (4): 5
  - Fourth division (regional leagues) (5): 4
  - Media amateur clubs (6): 2
- Total: 103 clubs.

== Distribution ==
The teams of Premier League and the other teams will qualify to knockout phase in two different paths. Premier league teams will play in the RPL path group stage with a double round-robin tournament, divided into 4 groups with 4 teams in each group, while the other teams will play in the regions path qualification, starting with 1/256 round until 1/8 round with 1 match in each stage.

== Round dates ==
The schedule of the competition is as follows:

Phase	Round			Match date
Qualifying rounds (Match 2)	Round 1			16–18 August 2022
Qualifying rounds (Match 2)	Round 2			30 August – 1 September 2022
Qualifying rounds (Match 2)	Round 3			13–15 September 2022
Qualifying rounds (Match 2)	Round 4			4–5 October 2022
Qualifying rounds (Match 2)	Round 5			1–2 November 2022
Qualifying rounds (Match 2)	Round 6			15–16 November 2022
Group stage (Match 1)	Matchday 1			30–31 August 2022
Group stage (Match 1)	Matchday 2			13–15 September 2022
Group stage (Match 1)	Matchday 3			28–30 September 2022
Group stage (Match 1)	Matchday 4			18–20 October 2022
Group stage (Match 1)	Matchday 5			16, 22–23 November 2022
Group stage (Match 1)	Matchday 6			26–27 November 2022
Knockout stage	Quarter-finals	RPL path	Match 1	22–23 February 2023
Knockout stage	Quarter-finals	RPL path	Match 2	27 February – 1 March 2023
Knockout stage	Quarter-finals	Regions path	Stage 1	25–27 February 2023
Knockout stage	Quarter-finals	Regions path	Stage 2	14–16 March 2023
Knockout stage	Semi-finals	RPL path	Match 1	14–15 March 2023
Knockout stage	Semi-finals	RPL path	Match 2	4–5 April 2023
Knockout stage	Semi-finals	Regions path	Stage 1	4, 6 April 2023
Knockout stage	Semi-finals	Regions path	Stage 2	19 April 2023
Knockout stage	Path finals	RPL path	Match 1	19 April 2023
Knockout stage	Path finals	RPL path	Match 2	3 May 2023
Knockout stage	Path finals	Regions path	Stage 1	3 May 2023
Knockout stage	Path finals	Regions path	Stage 2	17 May 2023
Knockout stage	Final			11 June 2023

== Qualifying round (regions path) ==
=== Round 1 ===
The draw for rounds 1, 2 and 3 was held on 11 August 2022, 18:00.
Entered clubs:

- 10 clubs from Amateur leagues
- 14 lowest clubs from Russian Second League

Times are MSK (UTC+3), as listed by RFU (local times, if different, are in parentheses).

16 August 2022	Amkal Moscow (6)	1–1 (8–7 p)	Zorkiy Krasnogorsk (3)	Moscow
19:00	Gasilin 58'	Report	Popovitskiy 23'	Stadium: Luzhniki Sportivny Gorodok; Attendance: 1,300; Referee: Daniil Shemetov
	Penalties
	Popkov (penalty scored); Gasilin (penalty missed); Karpov (penalty scored); Kuzkin (penalty scored); Levshuk (penalty scored); Prokopyev (penalty scored); Tovmasyan (penalty scored); Shurygin (penalty scored); Drazhzhuk (penalty scored)		(penalty scored) Sladkov; (penalty scored) Popovitskiy; (penalty scored) Ferapontov; (penalty scored) Demetradze; (penalty missed) Beskorovaynyi; (penalty scored) Kerimov; (penalty scored) Imaev; (penalty scored) Shaulukhov; (penalty missed) Bobkov

17 August 2022	Temp Barnaul (4)	2–1	Dynamo Barnaul (3)	Barnaul
14:30 (18:30 KRAT)	Vorona 31' (pen.); Sychyov 85'	Report	Zhitnikov 90+3'	Stadium: Dynamo Stadium; Attendance: 2,896; Referee: Aleksandr Mayun

17 August 2022	Kolomna (3)	1–0	Saturn Ramenskoye (3)	Kolomna
15:00	Ivanchenko 36'	Report		Stadium: Trud Stadium; Referee: Vladimir Falov

17 August 2022	Yessentuki (3)	0–3	StavropolAgroSoyuz Nevinnomyssk (5)	Yessentuki
17:00		Report	Saverskiy 62'; Kablakhov 86' (pen.); Rymar 90+4'	Stadium: Yessentuki Arena; Attendance: 200; Referee: Vitaliy Doroshenko

17 August 2022	Dynamo Stavropol (3)	3–0	Armavir (5)	Stavropol
18:00	Suanov 41' (pen.), 53' (pen.); Puchkov 73'	Report		Stadium: Dynamo Stadium; Attendance: 500; Referee: Inal Tanashev

17 August 2022	2DROTS Moscow (6)	3–0	Chertanovo Moscow (3)	Khimki
18:30	Kutuzov 50'; Sklyar 58'; A.R. Stepanov 81'	Report		Stadium: Arena Khimki; Attendance: 3,150; Referee: Igor Vertkov

17 August 2022	Elektron Veliky Novgorod (3)	2–0	SSh7-Karelia Petrozavodsk (4)	Veliky Novgorod
19:00	Zhabkin 10'; Mosunov 67'	Report		Stadium: Elektron Stadium; Attendance: 800; Referee: Aleksandr Anufriev

17 August 2022	Nefis Kazan (5)	0–1	Khimik-Avgust Vurnary (3)	Kazan
19:00		Report	Chamzhaev 90'	Stadium: Central Stadium; Attendance: 2,300; Referee: Pavel Lysenko

17 August 2022	Sakhalinets Moscow (3)	1–0	Balashikha (3)	Moscow
19:30	Rubtsov 87'	Report		Stadium: Spartak Academy Stadium; Attendance: 1,500; Referee: Ilya Bugrov

18 August 2022	Okean Nakhodka (4)	0–2	Dynamo Vladivostok (3)	Nakhodka
10:00 (17:00 VLAT)		Report	Gigolayev 12' (pen.); Chufyrov 44'	Stadium: Vodnik Stadium; Attendance: 1,000; Referee: Ivan Pozhidaev

18 August 2022	FShM Moscow (4)	2–3	Khimik Dzerzhinsk (3)	Moscow
16:00	Kukushkin 45+2'; Morgunov 90+5'	Report	Khramov 19'; Abramushkin 45+1'; Druzhinin 89'	Stadium: Luzhniki Olympic Complex; Attendance: 103; Referee: Marina Krupskaya

18 August 2022	Peresvet-Tryokhgorka Domodedovo (4)	1–1 (3–4 p)	Kosmos Dolgoprudny (3)	Domodedovo
18:00	Kataev 88'	Report	Alshanskiy 42'	Stadium: Avangard Stadium; Attendance: 177; Referee: Igor Kaplenkov
	Penalties
	Lushnikov (penalty missed); Bushuev (penalty scored); Koryukov (penalty scored); Maslennikov (penalty missed); Maslenyi (penalty scored)		(penalty missed) Zaerko; (penalty scored) Nemchenko; (penalty scored) Popovich; (penalty scored) Kuzin; (penalty scored) Pakhomov

=== Round 2 ===
The draw for round 2 defining home and away team was held on 19 August 2022. Date of matches was determined on 24 August 2022.
Entered clubs:

- 12 winners of round 1
- 1 club from Amateur leagues
- 43 remaining clubs from Russian Second League (except Rotor Volgograd and Metallurg Lipetsk)

Times are (UTC+3), as listed by RFU (local times, if different, are in parentheses).

30 August 2022	Tekstilshchik Ivanovo (3)	1–1 (5–3 p)	2DROTS Moscow (6)	Ivanovo
16:00	Karpuk 57'	Report	Salnikov 26'	Stadium: Tekstilshchik Stadium; Attendance: 5,000; Referee: Rafael Shafeev
	Penalties
	Tenyayev (penalty scored); Matskharashvili (penalty scored); Klimov (penalty scored); Lyakh (penalty scored); Karpuk (penalty scored)		(penalty scored) Korotayev; (penalty scored) Oslonovsky; (penalty scored) Stepanov; (penalty missed) Talabko

30 August 2022	Spartak Nalchik (3)	1–0	Mashuk-KMV Pyatigorsk (3)	Nalchik
17:00	Kumykov 33'	Report		Stadium: Spartak Stadium; Attendance: 160; Referee: Vladimir Shamara

31 August 2022	Tver (3)	0–1	Amkal Moscow (6)	Krasnogorsk
13:00		Report	Kuzkin 14'	Stadium: Zorky Stadium; Attendance: 1,100; Referee: Artur Fyodorov

31 August 2022	Strogino Moscow (3)	3–2	Kaluga (3)	Moscow
13:00	Chernyshev 55', 83'; Kirakosyan 76'	Report	Samsonov 23' (pen.); Mukhin 79'	Stadium: Yantar Stadium; Attendance: 85; Referee: Vage Chichilyan

31 August 2022	Dynamo Vladivostok (3)	1–1 (5–3 p)	Novosibirsk (3)	Vladivostok
13:00 (20:00 VLAT)	Bayev 52'	Report	Radchenko 19'	Stadium: Dynamo Stadium; Attendance: 2,069; Referee: Ilya Bugrov
	Penalties
	Gigolayev (penalty scored); Mashnyov (penalty scored); Kramarenko (penalty scored); Podprugin (penalty scored); Tarek (penalty scored)		(penalty missed) Zhitnev; (penalty scored) Sharov; (penalty scored) Makurin; (penalty scored) Radchenko

31 August 2022	Zvezda Saint Petersburg (3)	2–1	Yadro Saint Petersburg (3)	Saint Petersburg
14:00	Grechikov 37'; Evsyutin 90+4'	Report	Matyash 55'	Stadium: Nova Arena; Attendance: 88; Referee: Sergey Osipov

31 August 2022	Leningradets Leningrad Oblast (3)	3–0	Elektron Veliky Novgorod (3)	Roshchino
14:00	I. Vorobyov 21'; Martyanov 52'; R. Vorobyov 76'	Report		Stadium: Roshchino Arena; Attendance: 103; Referee: Stanislav Isaev

31 August 2022	Zhasmin Mikhailovsk (5)	0–4	Chelyabinsk (3)	Sysert
14:00 (16:00 YEKT)		Report	Rudnev 16'; Saraev 27'; Azyavin 48'; Sergeev 74'	Stadium: Bazhoviya Stadium; Attendance: 150; Referee: Danil Kashirin

31 August 2022	Khimik-Avgust Vurnary (3)	2–0	Torpedo Miass (3)	Vurnary
15:00	Yaroslavkin 13'; Sokolov 47'	Report		Stadium: Khimik Stadium; Attendance: 412; Referee: Yan Marushko

31 August 2022	Biolog-Novokubansk (3)	2–3	Dynamo Stavropol (3)	Progress
16:00	Stepanovich 39'; Pereverzev 77'	Report	Suanov 11', 73'; Isik 26'	Stadium: Biolog Stadium; Attendance: 150; Referee: Bogdan Golovko

31 August 2022	Zenit Penza (3)	2–2 (3–2 p)	Sokol Saratov (3)	Penza
16:00	Ocheredin 36'; Kuptsov 56'	Report	Faskhutdinov 83'; Solovyov 88'	Stadium: Zenit Stadium; Attendance: 210; Referee: Artyom Kataykin

31 August 2022	Irtysh Omsk (3)	4–0	Temp Barnaul (4)	Omsk
16:00 (19:00 OMST)	Shleermakher 2' (pen.); Yusupov 9'; Makeev 21'; Trofimov 83'	Report		Stadium: SSh Krasnaya Zvezda Indoor Arena; Attendance: 1,800; Referee: Anton Sidorin

31 August 2022	Amkar Perm (3)	0–1	Zenit-Izhevsk (3)	Perm
16:30 (18:30 YEKT)		Report	Novitskiy 25'	Stadium: Zvezda Stadium; Attendance: 2,800; Referee: Igor Vertkov

31 August 2022	StavropolAgroSoyuz Nevinnomyssk (5)	4–3	Legion Makhachkala (3)	Stavropol
17:00	Zarochentsev 22'; Kablakhov 51' (pen.); Mutyev 67'; Fyodorov 75'	Report	Yakhyaev 34'; Vagabov 64'; Bitarov 86'	Stadium: Dynamo Stadium; Attendance: 250; Referee: Emir Privalov

31 August 2022	Forte Taganrog (3)	1–2	SKA Rostov-on-Don (3)	Taganrog
17:00	Malysh 45'	Report	Vorotnikov 8'; Kotelnikov 12'	Stadium: Forte Arena; Attendance: 745; Referee: Victor Latsviev

31 August 2022	Khimik Dzerzhinsk (3)	1–2	Murom (3)	Dzerzhinsk
17:00	Kabutov 18'	Report	Zinovich 69' (pen.); Madelkhan 86' (pen.)	Stadium: Khimik Stadium; Attendance: 355; Referee: Igor Zakharov

31 August 2022	Kosmos Dolgoprudny (3)	3–0	Sakhalin Yuzhno-Sakhalinsk (3)	Dolgoprudny
17:00	Smirnov 21'; Rogov 68'; Popovich 75'	Report		Stadium: Salyut Stadium; Attendance: 200; Referee: Vladimir Falov

31 August 2022	Kvant Obninsk (3)	0–3	Dynamo Bryansk (3)	Obninsk
17:00		Report	Olenev 55'; Medvedev 57'; Molchanov 68'	Stadium: Trud Stadium; Attendance: 286; Referee: Andrey Prokopov

31 August 2022	Tyumen (3)	3–1	Nosta Novotroitsk (3)	Tyumen
17:00 (19:00 YEKT)	Porokhov 30' (pen.); Pavlov 58'; Korotaev 85'	Report	Abramov 63'	Stadium: Geolog Stadium; Attendance: 2,000; Referee: Maksim Sutormin

31 August 2022	Luki-Energiya Velikiye Luki (3)	1–1 (2–4 p)	Dynamo Saint Petersburg (3)	Velikiye Luki
17:30	Spodarets 45'	Report	Fetisov 31' (o.g.)	Stadium: Ekspress Stadium; Attendance: 318; Referee: Aleksandr Anufriev
	Penalties
	Spodarets (penalty scored); Polyakov (penalty missed); Alenichev (penalty scored); Fetisov (penalty missed)		(penalty scored) Bugaenko; (penalty scored) Brovchuk; (penalty scored) Kuzmichyov; (penalty scored) Shikov

31 August 2022	Torpedo Vladimir (3)	2–0	Znamya Truda Orekhovo-Zuyevo (3)	Vladimir
18:00	Khokhlov 54'; Sass 75'	Report		Stadium: Torpedo Stadium; Attendance: 929; Referee: Yuriy Matveev

31 August 2022	Spartak Tambov (3)	3–1	Salyut Belgorod (3)	Tambov
18:00	Arkhipov 3'; Maslennikov 34'; Skrypnikov 35'	Report	Degtyaryov 33'	Stadium: Spartak Stadium; Attendance: 2,160; Referee: Vladislav Shipkov

31 August 2022	Chernomorets Novorossiysk (3)	2–0	Druzhba Maykop (3)	Novorossiysk
18:30	Grechkin 31'; Antonov 76'	Report		Stadium: Tsentralnyi Stadium; Attendance: 2,000; Referee: Aleksey Koltunov

31 August 2022	Chayka Peschanokopskoye (3)	1–1 (1–3 p)	Kuban-Holding Pavlovskaya (3)	Peschanokopskoye
18:30	Kolomiytsev 74'	Report	Lavrishchev 29'	Stadium: Tsentralnyi Stadium; Attendance: 800; Referee: Dmitriy Prokopov
	Penalties
	Kvekveskiri (penalty missed); Khokhlachyov (penalty missed); Zarypbekov (penalty scored); Uzhgin (penalty missed)		(penalty scored) Kozlov; (penalty scored) Dyshekov; (penalty scored) Matyushenko

31 August 2022	Spartak Kostroma (3)	3–1	Dynamo Vologda (3)	Kostroma
18:30	Ukomskiy 26', 67'; Merenchukov 33'	Report	Finashin 87'	Stadium: Urozhay Stadium; Attendance: 1,657; Referee: Dmitriy Matveev

31 August 2022	Ryazan (3)	4–0	Kolomna (3)	Ryazan
18:30	Purak 5', 40', 66'; Aksyonov 61'	Report		Stadium: Spartak Stadium; Attendance: 700; Referee: Danila Tsurkov

31 August 2022	Avangard Kursk (3)	2–0	Sakhalinets Moscow (3)	Kursk
18:30	Gershun 7'; Zemskov 23'	Report		Stadium: Trudovye Rezervy Stadium; Attendance: 3,577; Referee: Yegor Yegorov

1 September 2022	Znamya Noginsk (3)	1–2	Peresvet Domodedovo (3)	Orekhovo-Zuyevo
18:00	Gryaznov 88'	Report	Melnichenko 52'; Nasedkin 73'	Stadium: Znamya Truda Stadium; Attendance: 81; Referee: Maksim Chembulatov

=== Round 3 ===
The draw for round 3 defining home and away team was held on 2 September 2022. Date of matches was determined on 24 August 2022.
Entered clubs:

- 28 winners of round 2
- 2 highest clubs from Russian Second League (Rotor Volgograd and Metallurg Lipetsk)

Times are MSK (UTC+3), as listed by RFU (local times, if different, are in parentheses).

13 September 2022	Kosmos Dolgoprudny (3)	2–0	Zenit Penza (3)	Dolgoprudny
16:00	Alshanskiy 44'; Osinov 58'	Report		Stadium: Salyut Stadium; Attendance: 60; Referee: Artyom Kharin

14 September 2022	Dynamo Vladivostok (3)	2–1	Irtysh Omsk (3)	Vladivostok
12:00 (19:00 VLAT)	Baev 19'; Dudkin 44'	Report	Kiprin 66'	Stadium: Dynamo Stadium; Attendance: 1,234; Referee: Artyom Petrenko

14 September 2022	Amkal Moscow (6)	2–2 (2–4 p)	Zvezda Saint Petersburg (3)	Saint Petersburg
13:00	Kiryakov 15'; Blatov 88'	Report	N. Pershin 23'; Velikorodny 45'	Stadium: Smena Stadium; Attendance: 2,515; Referee: Artur Fyodorov
	Penalties
	Kashaev (penalty scored); Levin (penalty missed); Tovmasyan (penalty scored); Blatov (penalty missed)		(penalty scored) Ivanov; (penalty scored) Ignatovich; (penalty scored) Evsyutin; (penalty scored) Vartanyan

14 September 2022	Chelyabinsk (3)	0–1	Tyumen (3)	Chelyabinsk
14:30 (16:30 YEKT)		Report	Tyurin 38'	Stadium: Tsentralnyi Stadium; Attendance: 710; Referee: Aleksandr Sedinkin

14 September 2022	Zenit-Izhevsk (3)	5–1	Khimik-Avgust Vurnary (3)	Izhevsk
15:00 (16:00 SAMT)	Kravchenko 5'; Nagovitsyn 13', 42'; Novitskiy 35'; Simanov 49'	Report	Shalin 25' (pen.)	Stadium: Kupol Stadium; Attendance: 170; Referee: Daniil Shemetov

14 September 2022	SKA Rostov-on-Don (3)	0–3	Kuban-Holding Pavlovskaya (3)	Rostov-on-Don
16:00		Report	Shapovalov 33' (pen.); Matyushenko 58'; Yerokhin 75' (o.g.)	Stadium: Trud Stadium; Attendance: 234; Referee: Aleksey Lapatukhin

14 September 2022	Peresvet Domodedovo (3)	2–1	Ryazan (3)	Domodedovo
16:00	Kudryashov 10' (pen.); Pogonin 90+3'	Report	Bammatgereev 85'	Stadium: Avangard Stadium; Attendance: 112; Referee: Mikhail Plisko

14 September 2022	Dynamo Stavropol (3)	1–2	Chernomorets Novorossiysk (3)	Stavropol
18:00	Kurachinov 68'	Report	Magomedov 36'; Antonov 90'	Stadium: Dynamo Stadium; Attendance: 450; Referee: Artyom Kataykin

14 September 2022	Metallurg Lipetsk (3)	1–2	Rotor Volgograd (3)	Lipetsk
18:00	Yeleyev 38'	Report	Maksimenko 55'; Obivalin 90+3'	Stadium: Metallurg Stadium; Attendance: 1,155; Referee: Aleksey Koltunov

14 September 2022	Murom (3)	0–0 (1–3 p)	Torpedo Vladimir (3)	Murom
18:00		Report		Stadium: Victor Losev Stadium; Attendance: 1,400; Referee: Maksim Chembulatov
	Penalties
	Sysuyev (penalty missed); Zinovich (penalty missed); Madelkhan (penalty missed); Golub (penalty scored)		(penalty scored) Chuvilov; (penalty scored) Bulychev; (penalty missed) Labzin; (penalty scored) Daliyev

14 September 2022	Dynamo Bryansk (3)	3–1	Strogino Moscow (3)	Bryansk
18:00	Lopatin 1', 56'; Olenev 86'	Report	Agalakov 33'	Stadium: Dynamo Stadium; Attendance: 970; Referee: Roman Marnavskiy

14 September 2022	Spartak Kostroma (3)	1–4	Tekstilshchik Ivanovo (3)	Kostroma
18:30	Daniil Sokolov 88'	Report	Selemenev 40'; Vazitdinov 66', 70', 90'	Stadium: Urozhay Stadium; Attendance: 1,857; Referee: Igor Kaplenkov

14 September 2022	Avangard Kursk (3)	3–2	Spartak Tambov (3)	Kursk
18:30	Tarasov 14'; Loshkov 18'; Nabatov 89' (pen.)	Report	Myzgin 31', 85'	Stadium: Trudovye Rezervy Stadium; Attendance: 517; Referee: Dmitriy Prokopov

14 September 2022	Dynamo Saint Petersburg (3)	0–0 (5–4 p)	Leningradets Leningrad Oblast (3)	Saint Petersburg
19:00		Report		Stadium: Petrovsky Stadium; Attendance: 505; Referee: Yegor Yegorov
	Penalties
	Bugayenko (penalty scored); Yashchuk (penalty scored); Kuzmichyov (penalty scored); Shikov (penalty scored); Brovchuk (penalty scored)		(penalty scored) Sokolov; (penalty scored) Dmitriyev; (penalty missed) I. Vorobyov; (penalty scored) Shepelev; (penalty scored) Nesgovorov

15 September 2022	Spartak Nalchik (3)	1–1 (10–11 p)	StavropolAgroSoyuz Nevinnomyssk (5)	Nalchik
16:00	Khachirov 77'	Report	Zarochentsev 57'	Stadium: Spartak Stadium; Attendance: 160; Referee: Igor Kholin
	Penalties
	Ashuyev (penalty scored); Tulupov (penalty scored); Khachirov (penalty scored); Maslennikov (penalty scored); Daliyev (penalty scored); Belousov (penalty scored); Lelyukayev (penalty scored); Zhangurazov (penalty scored); Khutov (penalty scored); Siukayev (penalty missed); Ashuyev (penalty scored); Tulupov (penalty missed)		(penalty scored) Chernyshov; (penalty scored) Shevchenko; (penalty scored) Mutyev; (penalty scored) Fyodorov; (penalty scored) Kablakhov; (penalty scored) Nazgaidze; (penalty scored) Tabishev; (penalty scored) Urbitskiy; (penalty scored) Makhno; (penalty missed) Chikildin; (penalty scored) Chernyshov; (penalty scored) Kablakhov

=== Round 4 ===
The draw was held on 18 September 2022 at 13:00 MSK live on TV-channel «Match! Premier». Date of matches was determined on 27 September 2022.

Entered clubs:

- 15 winners of round 3
- 17 clubs from Russian First League

On 16 September draw procedure was released, that consisted of 2 phases. On the first phase 1 random ball with First League team from pot 2 was relocated to pot 1, then on the second phase usual draw procedure started. The teams from pot 1 played their matches in round 4 at home.

Pot 1	Pot 2
Avangard Kursk (3); Chernomorets Novorossiysk (3); Dynamo Bryansk (3); Dynamo Saint Petersburg (3); Dynamo Vladivostok (3); Kosmos Dolgoprudny (3); Kuban-Holding Pavlovskaya (3); Peresvet Domodedovo (3); Rotor Volgograd (3); StavropolAgroSoyuz Nevinnomyssk (5); Tekstilshchik Ivanovo (3); Torpedo Vladimir (3); Tyumen (3); Zenit-Izhevsk (3); Zvezda Saint Petersburg (3); Volga Ulyanovsk (2)	Akron Tolyatti (2); Alania Vladikavkaz (2); Arsenal Tula (2); Baltika Kaliningrad (2); Dynamo Makhachkala (2); KAMAZ Naberezhnye Chelny (2); Kuban Krasnodar (2); Neftekhimik Nizhnekamsk (2); Rodina Moscow (2); Rubin Kazan (2); Shinnik Yaroslavl (2); SKA-Khabarovsk (2); Ufa (2); Veles Moscow (2); Volga Ulyanovsk (2) → Pot 1; Volgar Astrakhan (2); Yenisey Krasnoyarsk (2)

The team from pot 2 that was replocated to pot 1 is written in italics. The team was unknown until it will be drawn from pot 1.

Times are MSK (UTC+3), as listed by RFU (local times, if different, are in parentheses).

4 October 2022	StavropolAgroSoyuz Nevinnomyssk (5)	0–3	Neftekhimik Nizhnekamsk (2)	Stavropol
17:00		Report	Dvoretskov 35'; Kotik 64'; Barsov 77'	Stadium: Dynamo Stadium; Attendance: 1,650; Referee: Victor Latsviyev

5 October 2022	Dynamo Vladivostok (3)	1–0	SKA-Khabarovsk (2)	Vladivostok
12:30 (19:30 VLAT)	Sergeyev 74'	Report		Stadium: Dynamo Stadium; Attendance: 1,679; Referee: Anton Anopa

5 October 2022	Zenit-Izhevsk (3)	0–1	KAMAZ Naberezhnye Chelny (2)	Izhevsk
13:00 (14:00 SAMT)		Report	Talikin 90+2'	Stadium: Kupol Stadium; Attendance: 1,000; Referee: Yevgeniy Galimov

5 October 2022	Kosmos Dolgoprudny (3)	1–1 (4–5 p)	Rodina Moscow (2)	Dolgoprudny
14:00	Sarkisov 19'	Report	Timoshenko 78'	Stadium: Salyut Stadium; Attendance: 150; Referee: Vladislav Shipkov
	Penalties
	Nemchenko (penalty scored); Smirnov (penalty scored); Kuzin (penalty missed); Ivakin (penalty scored); Shmarov (penalty scored)		(penalty scored) Timoshenko; (penalty scored) Kul; (penalty scored) Morozov; (penalty scored) Petukhov; (penalty scored) Kalmykov

5 October 2022	Kuban-Holding Pavlovskaya (3)	0–1	Ufa (2)	Pavlovskaya
15:00		Report	Nikitin 20'	Stadium: Urozhay Stadium; Attendance: 2,350; Referee: Vladimir Shamara

5 October 2022	Volga Ulyanovsk (2)	2–1	Rubin Kazan (2)	Ulyanovsk
15:00	Morozov 22'; Sapeta 66'	Report	Kosarev 1'	Stadium: Trud Stadium; Attendance: 2,600; Referee: Mikhail Cheremnykh

5 October 2022	Tyumen (3)	0–3	Volgar Astrakhan (2)	Tyumen
17:00 (19:00 YEKT)		Report	Pechyonkin 41'; Lesnikov 52'; Stefanovich 72'	Stadium: Geolog Stadium; Attendance: 2,000; Referee: Aleksandr Mayun

5 October 2022	Torpedo Vladimir (3)	0–1	Akron Tolyatti (2)	Vladimir
18:00		Report	Bazelyuk 68'	Stadium: Torpedo Stadium; Attendance: 724; Referee: Pavel Shishkin

5 October 2022	Dynamo Bryansk (3)	0–0 (5–4 p)	Arsenal Tula (2)	Bryansk
18:00		Report		Stadium: Dynamo Stadium; Attendance: 2,300; Referee: Yaroslav Khromey
	Penalties
	Lopatin (penalty scored); Drogunov (penalty scored); Sobolev (penalty scored); Medvedev (penalty scored); Marayev (penalty scored)		(penalty scored) Yakovlev; (penalty scored) Bolshakov; (penalty scored) Despotović; (penalty missed) Pomerko; (penalty scored) Stepanov

5 October 2022	Peresvet Domodedovo (3)	0–0 (5–4 p)	Baltika Kaliningrad (2)	Domodedovo
18:00		Report		Stadium: Avangard Stadium; Attendance: 312; Referee: Artyom Kharin
	Penalties
	Borisov (penalty scored); Yegizaryan (penalty scored); Sabusov (penalty scored); Yakovlev (penalty scored); Pogonin (penalty scored)		(penalty scored) Klyonkin; (penalty scored) Avanesyan; (penalty scored) Osipov; (penalty scored) Borisenko; (penalty missed) Putsko

5 October 2022	Avangard Kursk (3)	0–2	Dynamo Makhachkala (2)	Kursk
18:00		Report	Shumakhov 79'; Abduragimov 84'	Stadium: Trudovye Rezervy Stadium; Attendance: 1,076; Referee: Yan Marushko

5 October 2022	Chernomorets Novorossiysk (3)	0–1	Yenisey Krasnoyarsk (2)	Novorossiysk
18:30		Report	Gritsak 57'	Stadium: Trud Stadium; Attendance: 4,000; Referee: Nikolay Voloshin

5 October 2022	Tekstilshchik Ivanovo (3)	0–0 (2–4 p)	Kuban Krasnodar (2)	Ivanovo
18:30		Report		Stadium: Tekstilshchik Stadium; Attendance: 2,009; Referee: Stanislav Matveyev
	Penalties
	Tenyayev (penalty missed); Chesnokov (penalty scored); Vazitdinov (penalty scored); Lyakh (penalty missed)		(penalty scored) Chukanov; (penalty scored) Khomukha; (penalty scored) Takazov; (penalty missed) Tsallagov; (penalty scored) Moseychuk

5 October 2022	Rotor Volgograd (3)	1–1 (4–5 p)	Shinnik Yaroslavl (2)	Volgograd
19:00	Obivalin 70'	Report	Savinov 57'	Stadium: Volgograd Arena; Attendance: 7,190; Referee: Konstantin Yudanov
	Penalties
	Rodionov (penalty scored); Zuykov (penalty scored); Maksimenko (penalty scored); Martusevich (penalty scored); Akhmedkhanov (penalty missed)		(penalty scored) Yemelyanov; (penalty scored) Steshin; (penalty scored) Savinov; (penalty scored) Sokolov; (penalty scored) Razborov

5 October 2022	Dynamo Saint Petersburg (3)	2–3	Alania Vladikavkaz (2)	Saint Petersburg
19:00	Shikov 26'; Kuzmichyov 55'	Report	Eldarushev 7'; Khugayev 76'; Giorgobiani 80'	Stadium: Minor Sport Arena Petrovsky; Attendance: 593; Referee: German Kovalenko

5 October 2022	Zvezda Saint Petersburg (3)	2–0	Veles Moscow (2)	Saint Petersburg
19:00	N. Pershin 14' (pen.); Sukonkin 53'	Report		Stadium: Kirovets Stadium; Attendance: 231; Referee: Igor Zakharov

=== Round 5 ===
The draw was held on 7 October 2022 at 20:00 MSK live on TV-channel «Match! Premier». Date of matches was determined on 24 October 2022.
Times are MSK (UTC+3), as listed by RFU (local times, if different, are in parentheses).

1 November 2022	KAMAZ Naberezhnye Chelny (2)	2–0	Yenisey Krasnoyarsk (2)	Naberezhnye Chelny
18:00	Tarasenko 45+1'; Sikoyev 58'	Report		Stadium: KAMAZ Stadium; Attendance: 1,571; Referee: Ivan Abrosimov

2 November 2022	Ufa (2)	1–0	Dynamo Bryansk (3)	Ufa
12:00 (14:00 YEKT)	Cacintura 9'	Report		Stadium: Neftyanik Stadium; Attendance: 1,217; Referee: Ranel Ziyakov

2 November 2022	Rodina Moscow (2)	3–4	Zvezda Saint Petersburg (3)	Moscow
14:00	Andreyev 27'; Gabarayev 41'; Gordyushenko 82' (pen.)	Report	M. Pershin 29', 57'; Sukonkin 63'; Kudryashov 71'	Stadium: Spartak Academy Stadium; Attendance: 108; Referee: Yevgeniy Galimov

2 November 2022	Akron Tolyatti (2)	5–0	Peresvet Domodedovo (3)	Zhigulyovsk
16:00 (17:00 SAMT)	Bazelyuk 34', 41'; Azarov 53'; Sagutkin 70'; Kozhedub 82'	Report		Stadium: Kristall Stadium; Attendance: 110; Referee: Nikolay Voloshin

2 November 2022	Alania Vladikavkaz (2)	3–0	Volgar Astrakhan (2)	Grozny
17:00	Kaplenko 19' (o.g.); Tashayev 46'; Gagloyev 90+2'	Report		Stadium: Sultan Bilimkhanov Stadium; Attendance: 260; Referee: Vladimir Seldyakov

2 November 2022	Neftekhimik Nizhnekamsk (2)	1–2	Volga Ulyanovsk (2)	Nizhnekamsk
18:00	Kotov 24'	Report	Yefremov 16', 40'	Stadium: Neftekhimik Stadium; Attendance: 475; Referee: Konstantin Yudanov

2 November 2022	Dynamo Makhachkala (2)	0–0 (5–3 p)	Dynamo Vladivostok (3)	Makhachkala
18:30		Report		Stadium: Anzhi Arena; Attendance: 3,400; Referee: Mikhail Cheremnykh
	Penalties
	Vagidov (penalty scored); Magomedov (penalty scored); Kagermazov (penalty scored); Yusupov (penalty scored); Alibekov (penalty scored)		(penalty scored) Gigolayev; (penalty missed) Mashnev; (penalty scored) Pervushin; (penalty scored) Tarek

2 November 2022	Shinnik Yaroslavl (2)	0–0 (4–5 p)	Kuban Krasnodar (2)	Yaroslavl
19:00		Report		Stadium: Shinnik Stadium; Attendance: 1,050; Referee: Aleksey Lapatukhin
	Penalties
	Razborov (penalty scored); Steshin (penalty scored); Batyunin (penalty missed); Semyonov (penalty scored); Gruznov (penalty scored)		(penalty scored) Khomukha; (penalty scored) Bezdenezhnykh; (penalty scored) Takazov; (penalty scored) Yugaldin; (penalty scored) Moseychuk

=== Round 6 ===
The draw was held on 2 November 2022 at 21:00 MSK live on TV-channel «Match! Premier». Date of matches was determined on 8 November 2022.

Times are MSK (UTC+3), as listed by RFU (local times, if different, are in parentheses).

15 November 2022	Ufa (2)	2–2 (4–3 p)	Dynamo Makhachkala (2)	Ufa
15:00 (17:00 YEKT)	Minayev 49'; Ortiz 59' (pen.)	Report	Magomedov 42', 78'	Stadium: Neftyanik Stadium; Attendance: 1,117; Referee: Roman Galimov
	Penalties
	Ortiz (penalty scored); Cacintura (penalty scored); Pliyev (penalty missed); Yemelyanov (penalty scored); Minayev (penalty scored)		(penalty scored) Vagidov; (penalty scored) Magomedov; (penalty scored) Gadzhiyev; (penalty missed) Kagermazov; (penalty missed) Alibekov

16 November 2022	KAMAZ Naberezhnye Chelny (2)	1–2	Zvezda Saint Petersburg (3)	Nizhnekamsk
14:00	Kirsanov 90+4'	Report	Utkin 7'; Sukonkin 71'	Stadium: Neftekhimik Stadium; Attendance: 214; Referee: Vladimir Seldyakov

16 November 2022	Akron Tolyatti (2)	1–0	Alania Vladikavkaz (2)	Zhigulyovsk
15:00 (16:00 SAMT)	Sasin 55'	Report		Stadium: Kristall Stadium; Attendance: 455; Referee: Andrey Fisenko

16 November 2022	Kuban Krasnodar (2)	1–2	Volga Ulyanovsk (2)	Krasnodar
18:00	Abdokov 71'	Report	Rakhmanov 18'; Arsentyev 28'	Stadium: Kuban Stadium; Attendance: 859; Referee: Oleg Sokolov

== Group stage (RPL path) ==
The draw for group stage was held on 17 August 2022 in 20:30 MSK (UTC+3) live on TV-channel «Match TV».

16 teams of the Russian Premier League (RPL) will start the tournament from the group stage (4 teams in each group). The teams will play 6 matches in the group stage:

- 1st day – 30–31 August;
- 2nd day – 13–14 September;
- 3rd day – 28–29 September;
- 4th day – 18–20 October;
- 5th day – 16, 22–23 November;
- 6th day – 26–27 November.

On 12 August released composition of the pots. It is based on results of the 2021–22 Russian Premier League and 2021–22 Russian Football National League. In the same group there can't be more than 2 teams from Moscow and Moscow oblast, also FC Krasnodar, FC Rostov and Fakel Voronezh can't be in the same group due to logistics restrictions in this cities.

Pot 1	Pot 2	Pot 3	Pot 4
Zenit Saint Petersburg; Sochi; Dynamo Moscow; Krasnodar	CSKA Moscow; Lokomotiv Moscow; Akhmat Grozny; Krylia Sovetov Samara	Rostov; Spartak Moscow; Pari Nizhny Novgorod; Ural Yekaterinburg	Khimki; Torpedo Moscow; Fakel Voronezh; Orenburg

Times are MSK (UTC+3), as listed by RFU (local times, if different, are in parentheses).

=== Group A ===
Pos	Team	Pld	W	PW	PL	L	GF	GA	GD	Pts	Qualification	KRA	LOK	PNN	KHI
1	Krasnodar	6	4	0	1	1	11	4	+7	13	Qualification to the Knockout phase (RPL path)	—	1–0	2–0	4–1
2	Lokomotiv Moscow	6	3	1	0	2	11	6	+5	11	Qualification to the Knockout phase (RPL path)	2–2 (3–1 p)	—	3–1	1–0
3	Pari Nizhny Novgorod	6	2	2	0	2	6	7	−1	10	Qualification to the Knockout phase (regions path)	1–0	2–0	—	1–1 (5–3 p)
4	Khimki	6	0	0	2	4	3	14	−11	2		0–2	0–5	1–1 (1–3 p)	—

Source: Russian Football Union (in Russian), Soccerway
Rules for classification: 1) Points; 2) Head-to-head points; 3) Head-to-head matches won; 4) Head-to-head goal difference; 5) Head-to-head goals scored; 6) Matches won; 7) Goal difference; 8) Goals scored; 9) Penalty shoot-out goal difference; 10) Draw.

31 August 2022 Matchday 1	Khimki	0–2	Krasnodar	Khimki
16:30		Report	Litvinov 27'; Akhmetov 41'	Stadium: Arena Khimki; Attendance: 837; Referee: Anton Frolov

31 August 2022 Matchday 1	Pari Nizhny Novgorod	2–0	Lokomotiv Moscow	Nizhny Novgorod
18:30	Aleksandrov 11', 61'	Report		Stadium: Nizhny Novgorod Stadium; Attendance: 7,017; Referee: Pavel Kukuyan

13 September 2022 Matchday 2	Pari Nizhny Novgorod	1–1 (5–3 p)	Khimki	Nizhny Novgorod
15:00	Suleymanov 82'	Report	Glushakov 84'	Stadium: Nizhny Novgorod Stadium; Attendance: 4,717; Referee: Ivan Sidenkov
	Penalties
	Suleymanov (penalty scored); Zhigulyov (penalty scored); Kakkoyev (penalty scored); Nabiullin (penalty scored); Sevikyan (penalty scored)		(penalty scored) Glushakov; (penalty scored) Malykhin; (penalty missed) Lomovitsky; (penalty scored) Filin

14 September 2022 Matchday 2	Lokomotiv Moscow	2–2 (3–1 p)	Krasnodar	Moscow
15:00	Kamano 6'; Kerk 58'	Report	Litvinov 12'; Córdoba 20'	Stadium: RZD Arena; Attendance: 4,512; Referee: Artyom Lyubimov
	Penalties
	Isidor (penalty scored); Pedrinho (penalty scored); Ignatyev (penalty scored)		(penalty scored) Ramírez; (penalty missed) Sorokin; (penalty missed) Krivtsov; (penalty missed) Akhmetov

28 September 2022 Matchday 3	Khimki	0–5	Lokomotiv Moscow	Khimki
17:30		Report	Pedrinho 20', 36', 50', 59'; Isidor 57'	Stadium: Arena Khimki; Attendance: 1,057; Referee: Artyom Chistyakov

28 September 2022 Matchday 3	Krasnodar	2–0	Pari Nizhny Novgorod	Krasnodar
20:00	Córdoba 85'; Olusegun 87'	Report		Stadium: Krasnodar Stadium; Attendance: 15,096; Referee: Roman Safyan

18 October 2022 Matchday 4	Lokomotiv Moscow	1–0	Khimki	Moscow
18:00	Miranchik 54' (pen.)	Report		Stadium: RZD Arena; Attendance: 2,672; Referee: Aleksey Amelin

19 October 2022 Matchday 4	Pari Nizhny Novgorod	1–0	Krasnodar	Nizhny Novgorod
18:00	Shiltsov 49'	Report		Stadium: Nizhny Novgorod Stadium; Attendance: 6,150; Referee: Vladimir Moskalyov

22 November 2022 Matchday 5	Khimki	1–1 (1–3 p)	Pari Nizhny Novgorod	Khimki
17:30	Rudenko 40'	Report	Aleksandrov 65'	Stadium: Arena Khimki; Attendance: 835; Referee: Sergey Cheban
	Penalties
	Magomedov (penalty scored); Kazantsev (penalty missed); Nikitin (penalty missed); Dolgov (penalty missed)		(penalty scored) Shiltsov; (penalty scored) Kalinsky; (penalty scored) Aleksandrov

23 November 2022 Matchday 5	Krasnodar	1–0	Lokomotiv Moscow	Krasnodar
20:00	Akhmetov 1'	Report		Stadium: Krasnodar Stadium; Attendance: 23,237; Referee: Sergey Karasyov

27 November 2022 Matchday 6	Lokomotiv Moscow	3–1	Pari Nizhny Novgorod	Moscow
19:00	Tiknizyan 30'; Kamano 33'; Isidor 81'	Report	Suleymanov 90+2' (pen.)	Stadium: RZD Arena; Attendance: 4,120; Referee: Sergey Ivanov

27 November 2022 Matchday 6	Krasnodar	4–1	Khimki	Krasnodar
19:00	Spertsyan 13'; Córdoba 32', 56'; Koksharov 89'	Report	Magomedov 30'	Stadium: Krasnodar Stadium; Attendance: 20,278; Referee: Rafael Shafeyev

=== Group B ===
Pos	Team	Pld	W	PW	PL	L	GF	GA	GD	Pts	Qualification	SPA	KRY	ZEN	FAK
1	Spartak Moscow	6	4	0	1	1	10	3	+7	13	Qualification to the Knockout phase (RPL path)	—	1–0	3–0	3–0
2	Krylya Sovetov Samara	6	4	0	0	2	7	4	+3	12	Qualification to the Knockout phase (RPL path)	2–1	—	2–0	1–0
3	Zenit Saint Petersburg	6	3	1	0	2	6	6	0	11	Qualification to the Knockout phase (regions path)	0–0 (4–2 p)	2–1	—	2–0
4	Fakel Voronezh	6	0	0	0	6	1	11	−10	0		1–2	0–1	0–2	—

Source: Russian Football Union (in Russian), Soccerway
Rules for classification: 1) Points; 2) Head-to-head points; 3) Head-to-head matches won; 4) Head-to-head goal difference; 5) Head-to-head goals scored; 6) Matches won; 7) Goal difference; 8) Goals scored; 9) Penalty shoot-out goal difference; 10) Draw.

30 August 2022 Matchday 1	Spartak Moscow	1–0	Krylya Sovetov Samara	Moscow
19:00	Melyoshin 46'	Report		Stadium: Otkritie Bank Arena; Attendance: 7,573; Referee: Sergey Ivanov

31 August 2022 Matchday 1	Zenit Saint Petersburg	2–0	Fakel Voronezh	Saint Petersburg
19:00	Cassierra 23', 33'	Report		Stadium: Gazprom Arena; Attendance: 15,156; Referee: Aleksey Amelin

14 September 2022 Matchday 2	Krylya Sovetov Samara	2–0	Zenit Saint Petersburg	Samara
17:30 (18:30 SAMT)	Tsypchenko 83'; Glushenkov 90+2'	Report		Stadium: Solidarnost Samara Arena; Attendance: 8,496; Referee: Evgeny Kukulyak

15 September 2022 Matchday 2	Spartak Moscow	3–0	Fakel Voronezh	Moscow
17:30	Melyoshin 4'; Promes 34'; Sobolev 76'	Report		Stadium: Otkritie Bank Arena; Attendance: 4,936; Referee: Evgeny Turbin

29 September 2022 Matchday 3	Fakel Voronezh	0–1	Krylya Sovetov Samara	Voronezh
17:30		Report	Chirkovich 6'	Stadium: Tsentralnyi Profsoyuz Stadion; Attendance: 9,576; Referee: Anton Frolov

29 September 2022 Matchday 3	Spartak Moscow	3–0	Zenit Saint Petersburg	Moscow
20:30	Promes 79', 90+5'; Sobolev 86'	Report		Stadium: Otkritie Bank Arena; Attendance: 7,360; Referee: Vitali Meshkov

19 October 2022 Matchday 4	Fakel Voronezh	1–2	Spartak Moscow	Voronezh
18:00	Maksimov 77'	Report	Rasskazov 45+3'; Nicholson 51'	Stadium: Tsentralnyi Profsoyuz Stadion; Attendance: 13,854; Referee: Aleksey Sukhoy

20 October 2022 Matchday 4	Zenit Saint Petersburg	2–1	Krylya Sovetov Samara	Saint Petersburg
20:30	Sergeyev 17', 46'	Report	Ćirković 79'	Stadium: Gazprom Arena; Attendance: 16,080; Referee: Sergey Ivanov

16 November 2022 Matchday 5	Fakel Voronezh	0–2	Zenit Saint Petersburg	Voronezh
18:00		Report	Malcom 46', 82'	Stadium: Tsentralnyi Profsoyuz Stadion; Attendance: 12,067; Referee: Pavel Shadykhanov

23 November 2022 Matchday 5	Krylya Sovetov Samara	2–1	Spartak Moscow	Samara
18:00 (19:00 SAMT)	Kovalenko 73'; Pinyayev 74'	Report	Chernov 56'	Stadium: Solidarnost Samara Arena; Attendance: 6,412; Referee: Pavel Kukuyan

27 November 2022 Matchday 6	Krylya Sovetov Samara	1–0	Fakel Voronezh	Samara
16:00 (17:00 SAMT)	Tsypchenko 66'	Report		Stadium: Solidarnost Samara Arena; Attendance: 5,243; Referee: Ivan Sidenkov

27 November 2022 Matchday 6	Zenit Saint Petersburg	0–0 (4–2 p)	Spartak Moscow	Saint Petersburg
16:00		Report		Stadium: Gazprom Arena; Attendance: 51,813; Referee: Vladimir Moskalyov
	Penalties
	Kuzyayev (penalty scored); Mantuan (penalty scored); Mostovoy (penalty scored); Santos (penalty missed); Bakayev (penalty scored)		(penalty scored) Khlusevich; (penalty missed) Zinkovsky; (penalty scored) Litvinov; (penalty missed) Denisov

=== Group C ===
Pos	Team	Pld	W	PW	PL	L	GF	GA	GD	Pts	Qualification	DYN	ROS	AKH	ORE
1	Dynamo Moscow	6	3	0	1	2	9	8	+1	10	Qualification to the Knockout phase (RPL path)	—	3–1	2–1	1–0
2	Rostov	6	3	0	0	3	12	11	+1	9 (Note: Head-to-head goal difference: Rostov +1, Akhmat -1.)	Qualification to the Knockout phase (RPL path)	2–0	—	3–0	3–1
3	Akhmat Grozny	6	3	0	0	3	11	12	−1	9	Qualification to the Knockout phase (regions path)	2–1	3–1	—	3–1
4	Orenburg	6	2	1	0	3	12	13	−1	8		2–2 (4–3 p)	4–2	4–2	—

Source: Russian Football Union (in Russian), Soccerway
Rules for classification: 1) Points; 2) Head-to-head points; 3) Head-to-head matches won; 4) Head-to-head goal difference; 5) Head-to-head goals scored; 6) Matches won; 7) Goal difference; 8) Goals scored; 9) Penalty shoot-out goal difference; 10) Draw.
Notes:

31 August 2022 Matchday 1	Akhmat Grozny	3–1	Orenburg	Grozny
20:30	Folmer 26'; Sadulayev 32'; Ilyin 51'	Report	Sychevoy (Pisarsky) 77'	Stadium: Akhmat-Arena; Attendance: 7,340; Referee: Sergey Cheban

31 August 2022 Matchday 1	Rostov	2–0	Dynamo Moscow	Rostov-on-Don
21:00	Golenkov 23' (pen.), 43'	Report		Stadium: Rostov Arena; Attendance: 28,913; Referee: Vladimir Moskalyov

13 September 2022 Matchday 2	Dynamo Moscow	2–1	Akhmat Grozny	Moscow
17:30	Smolov 11'; Gladyshev 31'	Report	Oleynikov 18'	Stadium: VTB Arena; Attendance: 6,175; Referee: Vasily Kazartsev

14 September 2022 Matchday 2	Rostov	3–1	Orenburg	Rostov-on-Don
17:30	Golenkov 52', 85'; Shchetinin 90+5'	Report	Sivakow 88'	Stadium: Rostov Arena; Attendance: 22,115; Referee: Anton Frolov

28 September 2022 Matchday 3	Orenburg	2–2 (4–3 p)	Dynamo Moscow	Orenburg
17:30 (19:30 YEKT)	Pavlovets 82'; Sychevoy (Pisarsky) 89' (pen.)	Report	Zakharyan 42'; Grulyov 59'	Stadium: Gazovik Stadium; Attendance: 2,474; Referee: Ivan Sidenkov
	Penalties
	Ayupov (penalty scored); Gojković (penalty scored); Sychevoy (Pisarsky) (penalty scored); Oganesyan (penalty missed); Pavlovets (penalty scored)		Tyukavin (penalty scored); Fomin (penalty scored); Zakharyan (penalty scored); Gladyshev (penalty missed); Lesovoy (penalty missed)

29 September 2022 Matchday 3	Akhmat Grozny	3–1	Rostov	Grozny
15:00	Oleynikov 73' (pen.), 79'; Konaté 88'	Report	Tugarev 59'	Stadium: Akhmat-Arena; Attendance: 7,008; Referee: Aleksey Amelin

18 October 2022 Matchday 4	Dynamo Moscow	3–1	Rostov	Moscow
20:30	Makarov 44'; Grulyov 79'; Smolov 87'	Report	Poloz 55' (pen.)	Stadium: VTB Arena; Attendance: 7,134; Referee: Artyom Lyubimov

19 October 2022 Matchday 4	Orenburg	4–2	Akhmat Grozny	Orenburg
15:30 (17:30 YEKT)	Vorobyov 20' (pen.); Oganesyan 31'; Poluyakhtov 45+1'; Pavlovets 71'	Report	Agalarov 11'; Ilyin 39' (pen.)	Stadium: Gazovik Stadium; Attendance: 2,032; Referee: Vitali Meshkov

23 November 2022 Matchday 5	Orenburg	4–2	Rostov	Orenburg
14:00 (16:00 YEKT)	Melyokhin 2' (o.g.); Mansilla 5'; Florentín 37'; Sychevoy (Pisarsky) 66' (pen.)	Report	Bayramyan 55'; Melnikov 81'	Stadium: Gazovik Stadium; Attendance: 1,802; Referee: Aleksey Sukhoy

23 November 2022 Matchday 5	Akhmat Grozny	2–1	Dynamo Moscow	Grozny
16:00	Konaté 17'; Sadulayev 42' (pen.)	Report	Kutitsky 57'	Stadium: Akhmat-Arena; Attendance: 7,140; Referee: Kirill Levnikov

27 November 2022 Matchday 6	Rostov	3–0	Akhmat Grozny	Rostov-on-Don
14:00	Langovich 17'; Komlichenko 42'; Golenkov 86'	Report		Stadium: Rostov Arena; Attendance: 10,650; Referee: Roman Safyan

27 November 2022 Matchday 6	Dynamo Moscow	1–0	Orenburg	Moscow
14:00	Makarov 69'	Report		Stadium: VTB Arena; Attendance: 10,095; Referee: Pavel Kukuyan

=== Group D ===
Pos	Team	Pld	W	PW	PL	L	GF	GA	GD	Pts	Qualification	URA	CSK	TOR	SOC
1	Ural Yekaterinburg	6	4	1	0	1	9	5	+4	14	Qualification to the Knockout phase (RPL path)	—	0–0 (5–4 p)	1–0	2–0
2	CSKA Moscow	6	4	0	1	1	8	4	+4	13	Qualification to the Knockout phase (RPL path)	2–1	—	0–1	2–1
3	Torpedo Moscow	6	2	0	1	3	6	7	−1	7	Qualification to the Knockout phase (regions path)	1–2	0–2	—	1–1 (2–4 p)
4	Sochi	6	0	1	0	5	6	13	−7	2		2–3	1–2	1–3	—

Source: Russian Football Union (in Russian), Soccerway
Rules for classification: 1) Points; 2) Head-to-head points; 3) Head-to-head matches won; 4) Head-to-head goal difference; 5) Head-to-head goals scored; 6) Matches won; 7) Goal difference; 8) Goals scored; 9) Penalty shoot-out goal difference; 10) Draw.

31 August 2022 Matchday 1	Ural Yekaterinburg	2–0	Sochi	Yekaterinburg
15:00 (17:00 YEKT)	Yushin 8'; Yurganov 58' (o.g.)	Report		Stadium: Yekaterinburg Arena; Attendance: 5,122; Referee: Evgeny Turbin

31 August 2022 Matchday 1	Torpedo Moscow	0–2	CSKA Moscow	Moscow
17:00		Report	Ermakov 14'; Gaich 68'	Stadium: VTB Arena; Attendance: 3,449; Referee: Roman Galimov

14 September 2022 Matchday 2	Sochi	1–3	Torpedo Moscow	Sochi
15:00	Batyrev 21'	Report	Karayev 54'; Lebedenko 60'; Ryazantsev 75'	Stadium: Fisht Olympic Stadium; Attendance: 2,411; Referee: Vladimir Moskalyov

14 September 2022 Matchday 2	CSKA Moscow	2–1	Ural Yekaterinburg	Moscow
17:30	Willyan Rocha 77'; Gajić 90+3'	Report	Yushin 86'	Stadium: VEB Arena; Attendance: 2,501; Referee: Rafael Shafeev

28 September 2022 Matchday 3	Ural Yekaterinburg	1–0	Torpedo Moscow	Yekaterinburg
15:00 (17:00 YEKT)	Kashtanov 1'	Report		Stadium: Yekaterinburg Arena; Attendance: 2,288; Referee: Vasily Kazartsev

28 September 2022 Matchday 3	CSKA Moscow	2–1	Sochi	Moscow
20:00	Kuchayev 23'; Chalov 73'	Report	Sarveli 52'	Stadium: VEB Arena; Attendance: 2,440; Referee: Aleksey Sukhoy

19 October 2022 Matchday 4	CSKA Moscow	0–1	Torpedo Moscow	Moscow
20:30		Report	Ćurić 11' (pen.)	Stadium: VEB Arena; Attendance: 2,685; Referee: Anton Frolov

20 October 2022 Matchday 4	Sochi	2–3	Ural Yekaterinburg	Sochi
18:00	Yurganov 36'; Burmistrov 84'	Report	Gazinsky 27', 39'; Vloet 56'	Stadium: Fisht Olympic Stadium; Attendance: 2,739; Referee: Ivan Sidenkov

22 November 2022 Matchday 5	Ural Yekaterinburg	0–0 (5–4 p)	CSKA Moscow	Yekaterinburg
15:00 (17:00 YEKT)		Report		Stadium: Yekaterinburg Arena; Attendance: 15,247; Referee: Artyom Chistyakov
	Penalties
	Shatov (penalty scored); Gazinsky (penalty scored); Ranđelović (penalty scored); Goglichidze (penalty scored); Tatarinov (penalty missed); Begić (penalty scored)		(penalty missed) Moisés; (penalty scored) Gajić; (penalty scored) Yakovlev; (penalty scored) Méndez; (penalty scored) Chalov; (penalty missed) Yermakov

22 November 2022 Matchday 5	Torpedo Moscow	1–1 (2–4 p)	Sochi	Moscow
20:00	Karayev 56'	Report	Joãozinho 51'	Stadium: Luzhniki Stadium; Attendance: 1,170; Referee: Artur Fyodorov
	Penalties
	Samsonov (penalty missed); Smolnikov (penalty missed); Roganović (penalty scored); Kutepov (penalty scored)		(penalty scored) Makarchuk; (penalty missed) Sissako; (penalty scored) Drkušić; (penalty scored) Melkadze; (penalty scored) Terekhov

26 November 2022 Matchday 6	Sochi	1–2	CSKA Moscow	Sochi
16:00	Drkušić 45+2'	Report	Yermakov 4'; Yurganov 60' (o.g.)	Stadium: Fisht Olympic Stadium; Attendance: 3,997; Referee: Aleksey Amelin

26 November 2022 Matchday 6	Torpedo Moscow	1–2	Ural Yekaterinburg	Moscow
16:00	Laptev 78'	Report	Bicfalvi 54' (pen.), 73'	Stadium: Luzhniki Stadium; Attendance: 1,273; Referee: Yan Bobrovskiy

== Knockout phase ==
In the knockout phase, as in the qualification, the teams will be divided into 2 paths (brackets).

The teams in RPL path (upper bracket) will play against each other over two legs on a home-and-away basis. The teams that will lose after 2 legs in RPL path will have the second chance in the regions path.

The teams in the regions path (lower bracket) will play against each other in 1 match. Each round consists of 2 phases. In the quarter-finals first phase teams from the regions path qualification will play against the third placed team of RPL path group stage, then on the second stage they will play against RPL path quarter-finals loser. In the semi-finals and finals first phases the teams play with winners of the previous round of the regions path, the second phase is the same as in quarter-finals.

The winners of both paths will play in super final in June 2023 at Luzhniki stadium.

RPL path Quarter-finals	RPL path Semi-finals	RPL path Final	Final
Krylia Sovetov Samara	2	1	3
Dynamo Moscow	1	1	2
Krylia Sovetov Samara	2	0	2
CSKA Moscow	2	1	3
CSKA Moscow	3	0	3
Krasnodar	0	1	1
CSKA Moscow	1	2	3
Ural Yekaterinburg	1	1	2
Lokomotiv Moscow	0	2	2
Spartak Moscow	1	4	5
Spartak Moscow	1	1	2
Ural Yekaterinburg	1	2	3
Rostov	1	1	2
11 June 2023 – Luzhniki Stadium
Ural Yekaterinburg	1	2	3
Krasnodar	1 (5)
CSKA Moscow (p)	1 (6)
Regions path Quarter-finals; Stage 1	Regions path Quarter-finals; Stage 2	Regions path Semi-finals; Stage 1	Regions path Semi-finals; Stage 2	Regions path Final; Stage 1	Regions path Final; Stage 2
Akhmat Grozny	0
Krasnodar (p)	2 (3)
Ufa	1	Krasnodar	3
Krasnodar (p)	1 (5)	Krylia Sovetov Samara	2 (0)
Akhmat Grozny	2
Rostov	1 (3)	Krasnodar	2
Pari Nizhny Novgorod	0
Krasnodar (p)	0 (4)	Ural Yekaterinburg	1
Zvezda Saint Petersburg	0	Rostov	1
Akron Tolyatti	0 (2)
Pari Nizhny Novgorod	2
Zenit Saint Petersburg	1 (4)
Akron Tolyatti	2
Volga Ulyanovsk	0	Dynamo Moscow (p)	1 (5)
Dynamo Moscow	0 (1)	Spartak Moscow	1
Zenit Saint Petersburg	3
Akron Tolyatti (p)	0 (4)
Akron Tolyatti (p)	1 (7)
Akron Tolyatti	2	Lokomotiv Moscow	1 (6)
Torpedo Moscow	0

=== Quarter-finals ===
The draw was held on 3 December 2022 at 16:30 MSK live on TV-channel «Match TV».

In the quarter-final matches of RPL path teams from same group can't play with each other. Runners-up of group stage will play first matches at home. Winners of regions path round 6 will play stage 1 matches of regions path at home as well.

RPL path
Pot 1	Pot 2
Dynamo Moscow (1); Krasnodar (1); Spartak Moscow (1); Ural Yekaterinburg (1)	CSKA Moscow (1); Krylia Sovetov Samara (1); Lokomotiv Moscow (1); Rostov (1)

Regions path
Pot 1	Pot 2
Akron Tolyatti (2); Ufa (2); Volga Ulyanovsk (2); Zvezda Saint Petersburg (3)	Akhmat Grozny (1); Pari Nizhny Novgorod (1); Torpedo Moscow (1); Zenit Saint Petersburg (1)

Times are MSK (UTC+3), as listed by RFU (local times, if different, are in parentheses).

==== RPL path ====
Team 1	Agg.	Team 2	1st leg	2nd leg
Lokomotiv Moscow	2–5	Spartak Moscow	0–1	2–4
Krylia Sovetov Samara	3–2	Dynamo Moscow	2–1	1–1
Rostov	2–3	Ural Yekaterinburg	1–1	1–2
CSKA Moscow	3–1	Krasnodar	3–0	0–1

22 February 2023 RPL QF	Lokomotiv Moscow	0–1	Spartak Moscow	Moscow
20:00		Report	Purtsev 16'	Stadium: RZD Arena; Attendance: 11,060; Referee: Vladislav Bezborodov

27 February 2023 RPL QF	Spartak Moscow	4–2	Lokomotiv Moscow	Moscow
20:00	Ignatov 15'; Zobnin 56'; Martins 81'; Promes 90+9' (pen.)	Report	Miranchuk 17', 83'	Stadium: Otkritie Bank Arena; Attendance: 10,185; Referee: Sergey Ivanov

23 February 2023 RPL QF	Krylia Sovetov Samara	2–1	Dynamo Moscow	Samara
15:00 (16:00 SAMT)	Pisarsky 47'; Zuyev 88'	Report	Tyukavin 80'	Stadium: Solidarnost Samara Arena; Attendance: 7,364; Referee: Artyom Chistyakov

1 March 2023 RPL QF	Dynamo Moscow	1–1	Krylia Sovetov Samara	Moscow
20:00	Gladyshev 75'	Report	Pisarsky (Sychevoy) 29' (pen.)	Stadium: VTB Arena; Attendance: 6,588; Referee: Pavel Kukuyan

22 February 2023 RPL QF	Rostov	1–1	Ural Yekaterinburg	Rostov-on-Don
17:30	Komlichenko 67'	Report	Kashtanov 6' (pen.)	Stadium: Rostov Arena; Attendance: 5,877; Referee: Yevgeniy Kulyak

27 February 2023 RPL QF	Ural Yekaterinburg	2–1	Rostov	Yekaterinburg
17:00 (19:00 YEKT)	Yegorychev 27'; Vloet 88' (pen.)	Report	Osipenko 83' (pen.)	Stadium: Yekaterinburg Arena; Attendance: 9,568; Referee: Vladislav Bezborodov

23 February 2023 RPL QF	CSKA Moscow	3–0	Krasnodar	Moscow
17:30	Moisés 12'; Chalov 30'; Zabolotny 86'	Report		Stadium: VEB Arena; Attendance: 6,546; Referee: Pavel Kukuyan

28 February 2023 RPL QF	Krasnodar	1–0	CSKA Moscow	Krasnodar
19:30	Spertsyan 50'	Report		Stadium: Krasnodar Stadium; Attendance: 26,314; Referee: Sergei Karasev

==== Regions path ====
===== Stage 1 =====
25 February 2023 Regions QF 1	Volga Ulyanovsk (2)	0–3	Zenit Saint Petersburg (1)	Ulyanovsk
14:30 (15:30 SAMT)		Report	Bakayev 33'; Cassierra 78'; Sergeyev 90+1'	Stadium: Trud Stadium; Attendance: 7,900; Referee: Aleksey Sukhoy

26 February 2023 Regions QF 1	Akron Tolyatti (2)	2–0	Torpedo Moscow (1)	Zhigulyovsk
12:00 (13:00 SAMT)	Savichev 26' (pen.); Eldarushev 38'	Report		Stadium: Kristall Stadium; Attendance: 1,300; Referee: Artyom Lyubimov

26 February 2023 Regions QF 1	Ufa (2)	1–2	Akhmat Grozny (1)	Ufa
14:30 (16:30 YEKT)	Ortiz 67' (pen.)	Report	Agalarov 37'; Sadulayev 45'	Stadium: Neftyanik Stadium; Attendance: 3,825; Referee: Pavel Shadykhanov

27 February 2023 Regions QF 1	Zvezda Saint Petersburg (3)	0–2	Pari Nizhny Novgorod (1)	Saint Petersburg
14:30		Report	Kakkoyev 34'; Kornyushin 64'	Stadium: Kirovets Stadium; Attendance: 524; Referee: Anton Frolov

===== Stage 2 =====
The draw was held on 2 March 2023 at 14:25 MSK live on TV-channel «Match TV».

Pot 1	Pot 2
Akhmat Grozny (1); Akron Tolyatti (2); Pari Nizhny Novgorod (1); Zenit Saint Petersburg (1)	Dynamo Moscow (1); Krasnodar (1); Lokomotiv Moscow (1); Rostov (1)

14 March 2023 Regions QF 2	Akron Tolyatti (2)	1–1 (7–6 p)	Lokomotiv Moscow (1)	Zhigulyovsk
17:30 (18:30 SAMT)	Makarov 14'	Report	Kamano 75'	Stadium: Kristall Stadium; Attendance: 2,997; Referee: Artyom Chistyakov
	Penalties
	Savichev (penalty scored); Sasin (penalty scored); Eldarushev (penalty scored); Apekov (penalty missed); Chudin (penalty scored); Paliyenko (penalty scored); Makarov (penalty scored); Khodzhaniyazov (penalty scored)		(penalty missed) Zhemaletdinov; (penalty scored) Pinyayev; (penalty scored) Kamano; (penalty scored) Nenakhov; (penalty scored) Rakov; (penalty scored) Shchetinin; (penalty scored) Conti; (penalty missed) Kuzmichyov

15 March 2023 Regions QF 2	Akhmat Grozny (1)	0–3	Krasnodar (1)	Grozny
15:00		Report	Cobnan 27'; Krivtsov 60', 90+3'	Stadium: Akhmat Arena; Attendance: 6,700; Referee: Sergey Ivanov

15 March 2023 Regions QF 2	Zenit Saint Petersburg (1)	1–1 (4–5 p)	Dynamo Moscow (1)	Saint Petersburg
20:00	Bakayev 37'	Report	Ngamaleu 1'	Stadium: Gazprom Arena; Attendance: 31,087; Referee: Yevgeniy Kukulyak
	Penalties
	Adamov (penalty scored); Sutormin (penalty scored); Mostovoy (penalty scored); Kuzyayev (penalty missed); Claudinho (penalty scored); Douglas Santos (penalty missed)		(penalty scored) Fomin; (penalty missed) Grulyov; (penalty scored) Normann; (penalty scored) Lesovoy; (penalty scored) Gagnidze; (penalty scored) Dasa

16 March 2023 Regions QF 2	Pari Nizhny Novgorod (1)	0–1	Rostov (1)	Nizhny Novgorod
18:00		Report	Tugarev 82'	Stadium: Nizhny Novgorod Stadium; Attendance: 5,283; Referee: Pavel Shadykhanov

=== Semi-finals ===
==== RPL path ====
The draw was held on 2 March 2023 at 14:25 MSK live on TV-channel «Match TV».

Team 1	Agg.	Team 2	1st leg	2nd leg
Krylia Sovetov Samara	2–3	CSKA Moscow	2–2	0–1
Spartak Moscow	2–3	Ural Yekaterinburg	1–1	1–2

15 March 2023 RPL SF	Krylya Sovetov Samara	2–2	CSKA Moscow	Samara
17:30 (18:30 SAMT)	Pisarsky (Sychevoy) 49'; Tsypchenko 64'	Report	Medina 46'; Chalov 76' (pen.)	Stadium: Solidarnost Samara Arena; Attendance: 10,364; Referee: Aleksey Sukhoy

5 April 2023 RPL SF	CSKA Moscow	1–0	Krylya Sovetov Samara	Moscow
19:30	Bijl 90+2' (o.g.)	Report		Stadium: VEB Arena; Attendance: 7,849; Referee: Artyom Lyubimov

14 March 2023 RPL SF	Spartak Moscow	1–1	Ural Yekaterinburg	Moscow
20:00	Promes 21'	Report	Zheleznov 67'	Stadium: Otkritie Arena; Attendance: 9,595; Referee: Sergey Karasyov

4 April 2023 RPL SF	Ural Yekaterinburg	2–1	Spartak Moscow	Yekaterinburg
17:00 (19:00 YEKT)	Cissé 32'; Sungatulin 72'	Report	Baldé 49'	Stadium: Yekaterinburg Arena; Attendance: 24,778; Referee: Kirill Levnikov

==== Regions path ====
The draw was held on 17 March 2023 at 13:35 MSK live on TV-channel «Match TV».

===== Stage 1 =====
4 April 2023 Regions SF 1	Dynamo Moscow (1)	0–0 (1–4 p)	Akron Tolyatti (2)	Moscow
19:30		Report		Stadium: VTB Arena; Attendance: 11,364; Referee: Yevgeniy Turbin
	Penalties
	Fomin (penalty missed); Zakharyan (penalty scored); Lesovoy (penalty missed)		(penalty scored) Savichev; (penalty scored) Paliyenko; (penalty scored) Eldarushev; (penalty scored) Matsukatov

6 April 2023 Regions SF 1	Krasnodar (1)	1–1 (5–3 p)	Rostov (1)	Krasnodar
20:00	Spertsyan 24'	Report	Tugarev 54'	Stadium: Krasnodar Stadium; Attendance: 25,895; Referee: Vladislav Bezborodov
	Penalties
	Spertsyan (penalty scored); Ionov (penalty scored); Córdoba (penalty scored); Alonso (penalty scored); Krivtsov (penalty scored)		(penalty scored) Bayramyan; (penalty scored) Komlichenko; (penalty missed) Prokhin; (penalty scored) Tugarev

===== Stage 2 =====
The draw was held on 6 April 2023 at 22:40 MSK live on TV-channel «Match! Premier».

Pot 1	Pot 2
Akron Tolyatti (2); Krasnodar (1)	Krylia Sovetov Samara (1); Spartak Moscow (1)

19 April 2023 Regions SF 2	Akron Tolyatti (2)	2–1	Spartak Moscow (1)	Zhigulyovsk
16:30 (17:30 SAMT)	Ponce 41'; Saltykov 45+1'	Report	Tavres 78'	Stadium: Kristall Stadium; Attendance: 3,000; Referee: Aleksey Amelin

19 April 2023 Regions SF 2	Krasnodar (1)	2–2 (3–0 p)	Krylia Sovetov Samara (1)	Krasnodar
19:00	Sperstyan 32'; Córdoba 70'	Report	Tsypchenko 90+3'; Gaponov 90+5'	Stadium: Krasnodar Stadium; Attendance: 18,478; Referee: Pavel Shadykhanov
	Penalties
	Sperstyan (penalty scored); Banjac (penalty scored); Akhmetov (penalty scored)		Bijl (penalty missed); Pisarsky (penalty missed); Gorshkov (penalty missed)

=== Path finals ===
==== RPL path ====
The draw was held on 6 April 2023 at 22:40 MSK live on TV-channel «Match! Premier».

Team 1	Agg.	Team 2	1st leg	2nd leg
CSKA Moscow	3–2	Ural Yekaterinburg	1–1	2–1

19 April 2023 RPL final	CSKA Moscow	1–1	Ural Yekaterinburg	Moscow
19:00	Medina 89' (pen.)	Report	Bicfalvi 70'	Stadium: VEB Arena; Attendance: 6,725; Referee: Kirill Levnikov

3 May 2023 RPL final	Ural Yekaterinburg	1–2	CSKA Moscow	Yekaterinburg
17:00 (19:30 YEKT)	Vloet 51' (pen.)	Report	Medina 45+3'; Chalov 57'	Stadium: Yekaterinburg Arena; Attendance: 30,462; Referee: Sergey Ivanov

==== Regions path ====
===== Stage 1 =====
The draw that determines home team was held on 19 April 2023 at 21:00 MSK live on TV-channel «Match! Premier».

3 May 2023 Regions final 1	Krasnodar (1)	0–0 (4–2 p)	Akron Tolyatti (2)	Krasnodar
19:30		Report		Stadium: Krasnodar Stadium; Attendance: 27,125; Referee: Artyom Chistyakov
	Penalties
	Spertsyan (penalty scored); Córdoba (penalty scored); Akhmetov (penalty scored); Batxi (penalty scored)		(penalty scored) Savichev; (penalty missed) Pesegov; (penalty scored) Eldurashev; (penalty missed) Azarov

===== Stage 2 =====
17 May 2023 Regions final 2	Krasnodar (1)	2–1	Ural Yekaterinburg (1)	Krasnodar
19:30	Pantaleão 9'; Córdoba 59'	Report	Bicfalvi 22'	Stadium: Krasnodar Stadium; Attendance: 25,828; Referee: Sergei Karasev

=== Final ===
11 June 2023
17:00 MSK (UTC+3)

Krasnodar (1)	1–1	CSKA Moscow (1)
Córdoba 50'	Report	Chalov 32' (pen.)
Penalties
Spertsyan (penalty scored); Akhmetov (penalty scored); Córdoba (penalty scored); Batxi (penalty missed); Alonso (penalty scored); Ramírez (penalty scored); Olusegun (penalty missed)	5–6	(penalty scored) Chalov; (penalty scored) Diveyev; (penalty missed) Moisés; (penalty scored) Gajić; (penalty scored) Medina; (penalty scored) Carrascal; (penalty scored) Zabolotny

Luzhniki Stadium, Moscow
Attendance: 53,425
Referee: Vladislav Bezborodov
