= Daniil Kolesnikov =

Russian footballer

Personal information
- Full name: Daniil Sergeyevich Kolesnikov
- Date of birth: 23 May 2000 (age 26)
- Place of birth: Klintsy, Russia
- Height: 1.92 m (6 ft 3 1/2 in)
- Position: Goalkeeper

Senior career*
Years	Team	Apps	(Gls)
2015	FC Klintsy		
2018	SDYuSShOR Bronnitsy		
2020–2022	FC Akron Tolyatti	1	(0)
2022	FC Peresvet Domodedovo	11	(0)
2023	FC Khimik-Avgust Vurnary	8	(0)
- * Club domestic league appearances and goals as of 12 November 2023

Daniil Sergeyevich Kolesnikov (Russian: Даниил Сергеевич Колесников; born 23 May 2000) is a Russian football player.

== Club career ==
He made his debut in the Russian Football National League for FC Akron Tolyatti on 1 November 2020 in a game against FC Tekstilshchik Ivanovo.
