= Kuzmichyov =

Kuzmichyov is a surname. Notable people with the name include:

- Aleksandr Kuzmichyov (born 1971), Russian professional footballer
- Ilya Kuzmichyov (born 1988), Russian professional football player
- Ivan Kuzmichyov (born 2000), Russian football player
- Viktor Kuzmichyov (born 1992), Russian professional football player
- Vladimir Kuzmichyov (1979–2016), Russian footballer
