= Aleksandr Yeshkin =

Russian footballer and manager

Personal information
- Full name: Aleksandr Aleksandrovich Yeshkin
- Date of birth: 8 September 1982 (age 44)
- Height: 1.81 m (5 ft 11 1/2 in)
- Position: Midfielder

Senior career*
Years	Team	Apps	(Gls)
2001–2002	FC Torpedo-ZIL Moscow	0	(0)
2003	FC Torpedo-Metallurg Moscow	0	(0)
2003–2004	FC Metallurg-Kuzbass Novokuznetsk	63	(0)
2005–2006	FC Lada Tolyatti	60	(12)
2007	FC Dynamo Voronezh	14	(1)
2008	FC Dynamo Barnaul	18	(4)
2008	FC Nizhny Novgorod	8	(1)
2009	FC Tyumen	15	(2)
2009	FC Lada Tolyatti	15	(1)
2010	FC Dynamo Kirov	8	(0)
2010–2012	FC Tekstilshchik Ivanovo	45	(7)
2012–2013	FC Syzran-2003	15	(1)
2013	FC Znamya Truda Orekhovo-Zuyevo	13	(2)
2016	FC Lada Tolyatti	1	(0)

Managerial career
- 2017: FC Lada Tolyatti (assistant)
- 2018–2024: FC Khimik-Avgust Vurnary
- 2025: Nosta Novotroitsk
- * Club domestic league appearances and goals

Aleksandr Aleksandrovich Yeshkin (Russian: Александр Александрович Ешкин; born 8 September 1982) is a Russian professional football coach and a former player.

== Club career ==
He made his debut for FC Torpedo-ZIL Moscow on 14 September 2002 in a Russian Cup game against FC Lada Tolyatti. He played 4 seasons in the Russian Football National League for FC Metallurg-Kuzbass Novokuznetsk, FC Lada Tolyatti and FC Dynamo Barnaul.
