= FC StavropolAgroSoyuz Nevinnomyssk =

StavropolAgroSoyuz Nevinnomyssk
- Founded: 2017
- Ground: Nikolay Dontsov Stadium (Ivanovskoye)
- Manager: Kirill Eidelnant
- League: Stavropol Krai Championship

FC StavropolAgroSoyuz Nevinnomyssk (Russian: ФК «СтавропольАгроСоюз» Невинномысск) is an amateur, Russian football team based in Nevinnomyssk.

== History ==
The club was founded in 2017 by Aleksey Sagal. Sagal named the club after his company "StavropolAgroSoyuz".

In 2022–23 season the club became the best amateur team in Russian Cup, reaching round 4 of regions path qualification.

== Squad ==
Due to the amateur status of the club, the players work in other jobs in parallel. For example, Jaba Tigiyev is a taxi driver, Kantemir Nakhushev is a courier, Alexander Zarochentsev is a loader, the second goalkeeper Viktor Ishchenko is a traffic controller at the railway station.
