= Sergei Lapshin =

Russian footballer and coach

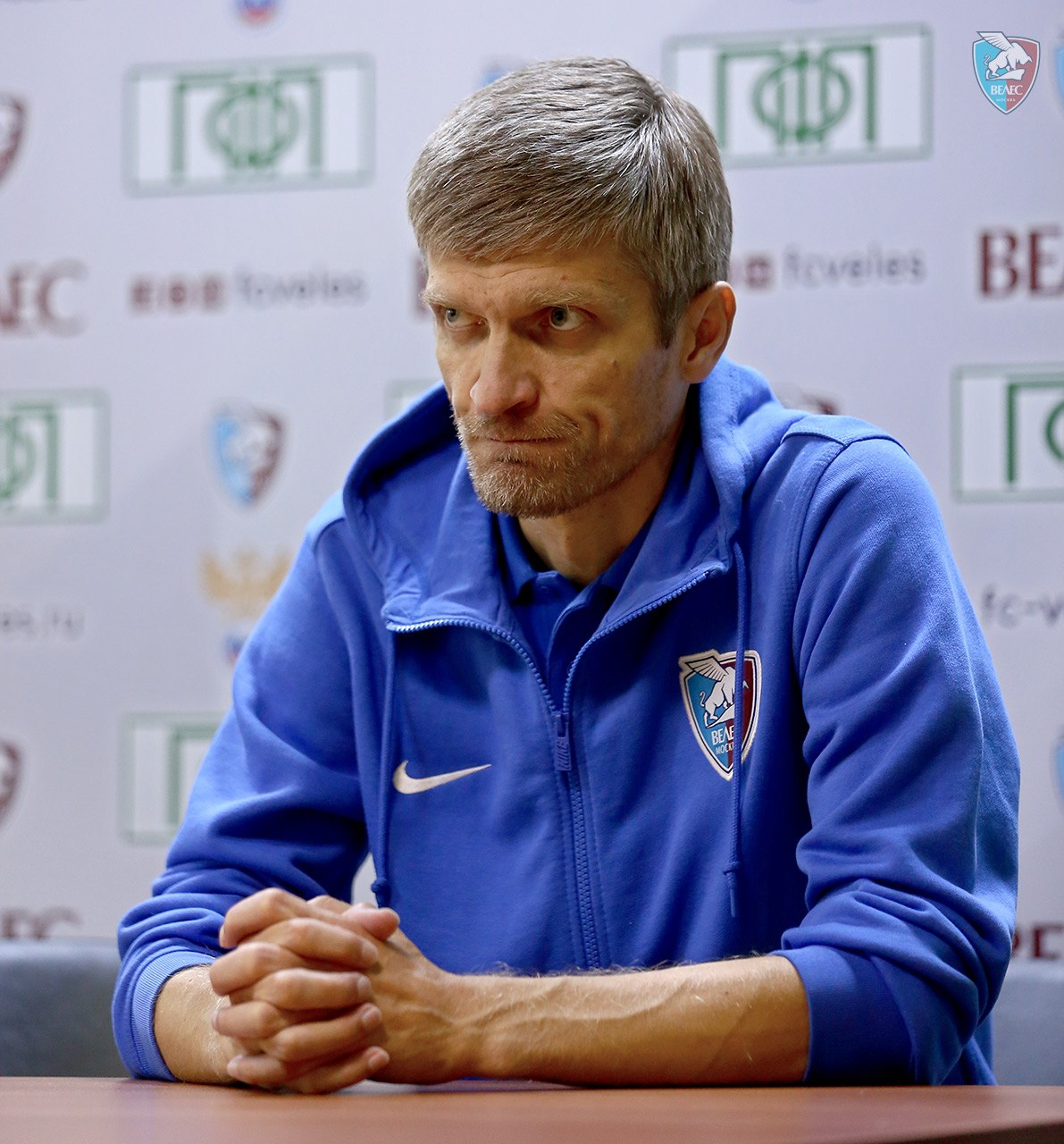
- Portrait of Sergei Lapshin

Personal information
- Full name: Sergei Ivanovich Lapshin
- Date of birth: 17 October 1974 (age 52)
- Height: 1.82 m (5 ft 11 1/2 in)
- Position: Midfielder

Team information
- Current team: FC Peresvet Domodedovo (manager)

Youth career
- SDYuSShOR-94 Krylatskoye Moscow
- FC Spartak Moscow

Senior career*
Years	Team	Apps	(Gls)
1992	FC Trion-Volga Tver	22	(1)
1993	FC Dynamo Moscow	0	(0)
1993	→ FC Dynamo-d Moscow (loan)	25	(0)
1995	FC Dynamo-2 Moscow	10	(4)
1996	FC Torgmash Lyubertsy	16	(2)
1997–1998	FC Khimki	49	(6)
1998	→ FC Krylia Sovetov Samara (loan)	11	(0)
1999	FC Moskabelmet Moscow (amateur)		
1999	FC Chernomorets Novorossiysk	4	(0)
2000–2001	FC Amkar Perm	28	(1)
2001	FC Khimki	11	(0)
2002	FC Kuzbass-Dynamo Kemerovo	17	(3)
2002	FC Metallurg-Zapsib Novokuznetsk	12	(2)
2003	FC Alla-L Lobnya (amateur)		
2003	FC Severstal Cherepovets	18	(5)
2004	FC Spartak Lukhovitsy	10	(1)
2004	FC Volga Ulyanovsk	12	(0)
2005	FC Fortuna Mytishchi (amateur)		
2006	FC Dmitrov (amateur)		
2007–2008	FC Fortuna Mytishchi (amateur)		

Managerial career
- 2013–2014: FC Strogino Moscow (assistant)
- 2017–2019: FC Veles Moscow
- 2023–: FC Peresvet Domodedovo
- * Club domestic league appearances and goals

Sergei Ivanovich Lapshin (Russian: Сергей Иванович Лапшин; born 17 October 1974) is a Russian football coach and a former player who is the manager of FC Peresvet Domodedovo.

== Career ==
A product of FC Spartak Moscow's youth football academy, Lapshin joined Russian Premier League side FC Krylia Sovetov Samara on loan after impressing for FC Khimki during 1998. He joined Premier League rivals FC Chernomorets Novorossiysk during the next season.

Lapshin played in the Russian First Division with FC Amkar Perm during the 2000 and 2001 seasons. He also played in the Russian Second Division with FC Khimki during the 1998 and 1999 seasons, with FC Kuzbass-Dynamo Kemerovo during the 2002 season, with FC Severstal Cherepovets during the 2003 season, and with FC Spartak Lukhovitsy during the 2004 season.

He was awarded the gold distinction to the All-Russian sports complex “Ready for Labor and Defense”.
