= Bakhadur Sokolov =

Russian footballer

Personal information
- Full name: Bakhadur Khurshedovich Sokolov
- Date of birth: 2 February 2000 (age 26)
- Place of birth: Samara, Russia
- Height: 1.73 m (5 ft 8 in)
- Position: Midfielder

Youth career
- PFC Krylia Sovetov Samara

Senior career*
Years	Team	Apps	(Gls)
2017–2018	FC Krylia Sovetov-2 Samara	11	(0)
2020–2021	PFC Krylia Sovetov Samara	2	(0)
2020–2021	→ FC Krylia Sovetov-2 Samara	20	(1)
2022	FC Lada-Tolyatti	8	(0)
2022–2023	FC Khimik-Avgust Vurnary	36	(1)
2024–2025	FC Volna Nizhny Novgorod Oblast	43	(10)
- * Club domestic league appearances and goals as of 19 October 2025

Bakhadur Khurshedovich Sokolov (Russian: Бахадур Хуршедович Соколов; born 2 February 2000) is a Russian football player.

== Club career ==
He made his debut in the Russian Football National League for PFC Krylia Sovetov Samara on 17 October 2020 in a game against FC Volgar Astrakhan.
