= Matvey Uzhgin =

Russian footballer

Personal information
- Full name: Matvey Alekseyevich Uzhgin
- Date of birth: 23 November 2000 (age 25)
- Place of birth: Krasnoyarsk, Russia
- Height: 1.75 m (5 ft 9 in)
- Position: Defender

Team information
- Current team: FC SKA-Khabarovsk
- Number: 61

Senior career*
Years	Team	Apps	(Gls)
2018–2020	FC Yenisey Krasnoyarsk	9	(0)
2020–2023	FC Chayka Peschanokopskoye	76	(2)
2023–2024	FC Yenisey Krasnoyarsk	1	(0)
2023–2024	FC Yenisey-2 Krasnoyarsk	3	(0)
2024–2026	FC Chayka Peschanokopskoye	14	(0)
2026	FC Tekstilshchik Ivanovo	14	(3)
2026–	FC SKA-Khabarovsk	0	(0)
- * Club domestic league appearances and goals as of 13 June 2026

Matvey Alekseyevich Uzhgin (Russian: Матвей Алексеевич Ужгин; born 23 November 2000) is a Russian football player who plays for FC SKA-Khabarovsk.

== Club career ==
He made his debut in the Russian Football National League for FC Yenisey Krasnoyarsk on 5 October 2019 in a game against FC Nizhny Novgorod.
