= Artyom Kotik =

Russian footballer

Personal information
- Full name: Artyom Denisovich Kotik
- Date of birth: 12 June 2001 (age 25)
- Height: 1.85 m (6 ft 1 in)
- Position: Forward

Team information
- Current team: Neftekhimik
- Number: 9

Youth career
- Neftekhimik

Senior career*
Years	Team	Apps	(Gls)
2020–	Neftekhimik	115	(11)
2024	→ Murom (loan)	17	(6)
2025	→ Amkar Perm (loan)	13	(10)
2025–2026	→ Amkar Perm (loan)	15	(7)
- * Club domestic league appearances and goals as of 14 June 2026

Artyom Denisovich Kotik (Russian: Артём Денисович Котик; born 12 June 2001) is a Russian football player who plays for Neftekhimik.

== Club career ==
He made his debut in the Russian Football National League for Neftekhimik on 15 March 2020 in a game against Khimki, he substituted Merabi Uridia in the 90th minute.
