= Nikolai Marayev =

Russian footballer

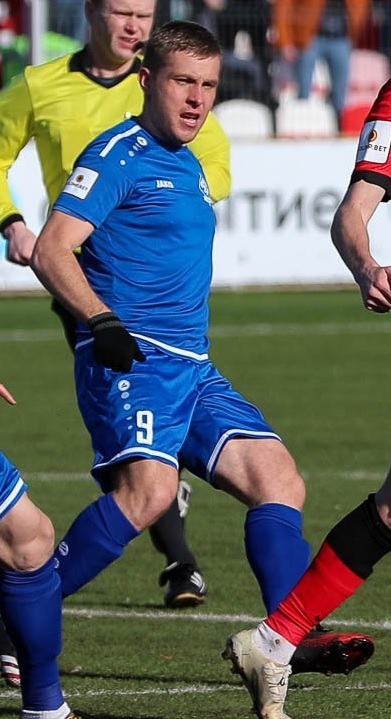
- Marayev with Dynamo Bryansk in 2021

Personal information
- Full name: Nikolai Vasilyevich Marayev
- Date of birth: 16 April 1995 (age 31)
- Place of birth: Mendyukino, Russia
- Height: 1.77 m (5 ft 10 in)
- Position: Midfielder

Youth career
- –2009: Luch Zaraysk
- 2009–2012: UOR Master-Saturn Yegoryevsk
- 2013: FC Strogino Moscow

Senior career*
Years	Team	Apps	(Gls)
2012–2014	FC Vityaz-M Podolsk		
2013	→ FC Strogino-M Moscow		
2014–2017	FSC Dolgoprudny	20	(0)
2017–2018	FC Spartak Kostroma	25	(5)
2018–2019	FC Znamya Truda Orekhovo-Zuyevo	22	(2)
2019–2023	FC Dynamo Bryansk	106	(7)
2023	FC Kolomna	15	(0)
- * Club domestic league appearances and goals

Nikolai Vasilyevich Marayev (Russian: Николай Васильевич Мараев; born 16 April 1995) is a Russian former football player.

== Club career ==
He made his debut in the Russian Football National League for FC Dynamo Bryansk on 1 August 2020 in a game against FC Orenburg, as a starter.
