= Nika Gigolayev =

Russian footballer

Personal information
- Full name: Nika Giyayevich Gigolayev
- Date of birth: 22 September 1994 (age 32)
- Place of birth: Tbilisi, Georgia
- Height: 1.69 m (5 ft 7 in)
- Position: Midfielder

Youth career
- –2014: FC Avtodor Vladikavkaz

Senior career*
Years	Team	Apps	(Gls)
2015–2016	FC Kubanskaya Korona Shevchenko		
2017	FC Feniks Bolshoy Beysug		
2018	PSK Pervorechenskoye		
2020–2021	FC Kuban-Holding Pavlovskaya	22	(10)
2021	FC Kuban Krasnodar	12	(0)
2022	FC Mashuk-KMV Pyatigorsk	11	(4)
2022–2023	FC Dynamo Vladivostok	25	(6)
- * Club domestic league appearances and goals

Nika Giyayevich Gigolayev (Russian: Ника Гияевич Гиголаев; born 22 September 1994) is a Russian former professional football player.

== Club career ==
He made his debut in the Russian Football National League for FC Kuban Krasnodar on 10 July 2021 in a game against FC Torpedo Moscow.
