= FC Elektron Veliky Novgorod =

Russian football team based in Moscow

- Full name: Football Club Elektron Veliky Novgorod
- Founded: 2022; 4 years ago
- Chairman: Nikita Bukiya
- Manager: Vasily Dorofeyev
- League: N/A
- 2023: Russian Second League, Division B, Group 2, 17th
- Website: http://www.fc-elektron.ru/
Home colours	Away colours

FC Elektron Veliky Novgorod (Russian: ФК «Электрон» (Великий Новгород)) was a Russian football team based in Veliky Novgorod. It was founded in 2022.

== Club history ==
The club predecessor, FC Elektron Novgorod, played in the Soviet Second League from 1969 to 1977.

The new club was formed in 2022, based on an existing football academy called Elektron, and received a professional license for the 2022–23 season of the Russian Second League.

Before the 2024 season, Elektron moved to Nizhny Novgorod and was re-registered as FC Volna Nizhny Novgorod Oblast.
