= Artyom Chistyakov =

Russian footballer

Personal information
- Full name: Artyom Aleksandrovich Chistyakov
- Date of birth: 15 April 2007 (age 19)
- Place of birth: Kstovo, Nizhniy Novgorod Oblast, Russia
- Height: 1.89 m (6 ft 2 in)
- Position: Defender

Team information
- Current team: Tver (on loan from Pari Nizhny Novgorod)
- Number: 52

Youth career
- –2017: Olimpiyets Nizhny Novgorod
- –2018: DYuSSh №1 Kstovo
- 2019–2021: Konoplyov football academy
- 2021: Krylia Sovetov Samara
- 2022–2024: CSKA Moscow

Senior career*
Years	Team	Apps	(Gls)
2024–	Pari Nizhny Novgorod	1	(0)
2024	→ Pari NN-2 Nizhny Novgorod	11	(0)
2026–	→ Tver (loan)	18	(1)

International career^{‡}
2022	Russia U-15	2	(0)
2022–2023	Russia U-16	8	(0)
2023	Russia U-17	3	(0)
- * Club domestic league appearances and goals as of 1 November 2026 ‡ National team caps and goals as of 17 November 2023

Artyom Aleksandrovich Chistyakov (Russian: Артём Александрович Чистяков; born 15 April 2007) is a Russian footballer who plays as a defender for Tver on loan from Pari Nizhny Novgorod.

== Club career ==
He made his debut in the Russian Second League for Pari NN-2 Nizhny Novgorod on 11 August 2024 in a game against Uralets Nizhniy Tagil.

He made his debut in the Russian Premier League for Pari Nizhny Novgorod on 7 December 2024 in a game against Spartak Moscow.

On 7 April 2026, Chistyakov was loaned by Tver of Russian Second League.

== Career statistics ==
As of 26 August 2025

Club	Season	League			Cup		Other		Total	
Club	Season	Division	Apps	Goals	Apps	Goals	Apps	Goals	Apps	Goals
Pari NN-2 Nizhny Novgorod	2024	Russian Second League B	11	0	–		–		11	0
Pari Nizhny Novgorod	2024–25	Russian Premier League	1	0	0	0	0	0	1	0
Pari Nizhny Novgorod	2025–26	Russian Premier League	0	0	0	0	–		0	0
Pari Nizhny Novgorod	Total		1	0	0	0	0	0	1	0
Career total			12	0	0	0	0	0	12	0
