= Dmitri Pereverzev =

Russian footballer

Personal information
- Full name: Dmitri Ravilevich Pereverzev (Karandash)
- Date of birth: 10 January 1998 (age 28)
- Place of birth: Oboyan, Russia
- Height: 1.72 m (5 ft 8 in)
- Position: Midfielder

Senior career*
Years	Team	Apps	(Gls)
2015	Legion Oboyan		
2017	Avangard-2 Kursk		
2018	Legion Oboyan		
2019	Salyut Belgorod	9	(2)
2019–2020	Armavir	16	(0)
2020–2021	Avangard Kursk	11	(1)
2021	Krasava Odintsovo	13	(2)
2022	Biolog-Novokubansk	32	(16)
2023	Spartak Kostroma	19	(3)
2024	Biolog-Novokubansk	28	(7)
2025	Avangard Kursk	11	(0)
2025–2026	Kuban-Holding Pavlovskaya	13	(1)
- * Club domestic league appearances and goals as of 22 November 2025

Dmitri Ravilevich Pereverzev (Russian: Дмитрий Равилевич Переверзев; born 10 January 1998) is a Russian football player.

== Club career ==
He made his debut in the Russian Professional Football League for FC Salyut Belgorod on 6 April 2019 in a game against FC Ryazan.

He made his Russian Football National League debut for FC Armavir on 9 July 2019 in a game against FC Krasnodar-2.
