= Dmitri Zinovich =

Russian footballer

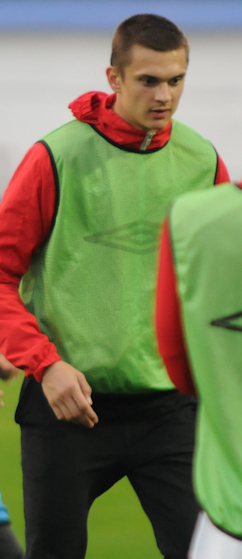
- Dmitri Zinovich in 2013

Personal information
- Full name: Dmitri Vasilyevich Zinovich
- Date of birth: 19 May 1989 (age 37)
- Place of birth: Murom, Vladimir Oblast, Soviet Union
- Height: 1.90 m (6 ft 3 in)
- Position: Midfielder

Youth career
- –2005: FC Shinnik Yaroslavl

Senior career*
Years	Team	Apps	(Gls)
2006–2008	FC Shinnik Yaroslavl	1	(0)
2007	→ FC Torpedo Vladimir (loan)	7	(0)
2009	FC Saturn-2 Moscow Oblast	20	(0)
2009–2010	FC Saturn Ramenskoye	1	(0)
2011–2012	FC Olimpia Gelendzhik	30	(3)
2012	FC Lokomotiv-2 Moscow	15	(2)
2013–2014	PFC Spartak Nalchik	12	(0)
2013	→ FC Zenit Penza (loan)	12	(1)
2014	FC Baltika Kaliningrad	21	(2)
2015	FC Khimik Dzerzhinsk	11	(1)
2015	FC Sokol Saratov	3	(0)
2015–2016	FC Zenit Penza	19	(3)
2016–2017	FC Torpedo Vladimir	19	(2)
2017–2018	FC Murom	15	(1)
2019–2021	FC Torpedo Vladimir	43	(0)
2021–2024	FC Murom	67	(2)
2024	FC Torpedo Vladimir	20	(0)

International career
2008	Russia U-19	3	(0)
- * Club domestic league appearances and goals

Dmitri Vasilyevich Zinovich (Russian: Дмитрий Васильевич Зинович, born on 19 May 1989) is a Russian former footballer who played as a midfielder.

== Career ==
Zinovich made his professional debut for FC Saturn Moscow Oblast on 14 July 2010 in the Russian Cup game against FC Sakhalin Yuzhno-Sakhalinsk.
