= FC Nefis Kazan =

FC Nefis
- Full name: Football Club Nefis Kazan
- Nickname(s): Kosmetologi, The Beauticians
- Founded: April 2021
- Ground: Elektron Stadium, 27 Karim Tinchurin Street, Kazan
- Capacity: 3,000
- Owner: Nefis Group
- General director: Konstantin Samarenkin
- League: Russian Football National League 2
Home colours

FC Nefis Kazan (Russian: «Нэфис» (Казань)` from Tatar: нәфис — adorable, exquisite) is a Russian football team based in Kazan. It played professionally in the Russian Football National League 2 from the 2022 season. The club plays their home games at the Elektron Stadium, which has a capacity of 3,000.

Nefis' home kit is all red. This kit has been used since their establishment in 2021. Unlike FC Rubin from the same area, the club is based on local players only.

== History ==
FC Nefis Kazan was established by senior executives at the Tatar cosmetics company Nefis, in April 2021.

Having won the Tatarstan Top League in their inaugural season without a single loss, the football club joined the Russian Football National League 2 in the 2022-23 season.

== League results ==
Season	League										Russian Cup
Season	Div.	Pos.	Pl.	W	D	L	GF	GA	GD	P	Russian Cup
2021	4th	1st	10	7	3	0	25	5	+5	24	Did not participate
2022–23	3rd										?

== Stadium ==
The main home ground for the club is the Elektron Stadium in Kazan, which has a capacity of 3,000. The arena was rebuilt for the 2018 World Cup, and new natural grass was planted. There is a training centre for youth clubs stationed nearby.

== Honours ==
- Tatarstan Football Championship

Champions: 2021
