= Kirill Sarayev =

Russian footballer (born 1997)

Personal information
- Full name: Kirill Viktorovich Sarayev
- Date of birth: 21 May 1997 (age 29)
- Place of birth: Syzran, Russia
- Height: 1.90 m (6 ft 3 in)
- Position: Centre back

Team information
- Current team: FC Amkar Perm
- Number: 15

Senior career*
Years	Team	Apps	(Gls)
2015	PFC CSKA Moscow	0	(0)
2016–2017	FC Dynamo Kirov	22	(0)
2017	FC Anzhi-Yunior Zelenodolsk	15	(1)
2018	FC Syzran-2003	6	(0)
2018–2019	FC Tekstilshchik Ivanovo	17	(1)
2020–2021	FC Ryazan	29	(0)
2021–2024	FC Chelyabinsk	64	(2)
2024–2026	FC Irtysh Omsk	80	(4)
2026–	FC Amkar Perm	11	(1)
- * Club domestic league appearances and goals as of 17 October 2026

Kirill Viktorovich Sarayev (Russian: Кирилл Викторович Сараев; born 21 May 1997) is a Russian football player who plays for FC Amkar Perm.

== Club career ==
He made his debut in the Russian Professional Football League for FC Dynamo Kirov on 20 April 2016 in a game against FC Chelyabinsk.

He made his Russian Football National League debut for FC Tekstilshchik Ivanovo on 7 July 2019 in a game against FC Yenisey Krasnoyarsk.
