= Ilya Kuzmichyov =

Russian footballer

Personal information
- Full name: Ilya Aleksandrovich Kuzmichyov
- Date of birth: 10 January 1988 (age 38)
- Place of birth: Leningrad, Russian SFSR
- Height: 1.78 m (5 ft 10 in)
- Position: Forward

Senior career*
Years	Team	Apps	(Gls)
2009–2010	FC Spartak Kostroma	66	(13)
2011–2013	FC Pskov-747	64	(18)
2013–2014	FC Tosno	24	(7)
2014–2015	FC Khimik Dzerzhinsk	18	(2)
2015–2017	FC Khimki	87	(20)
2018	FC Tom Tomsk	34	(4)
2019	FC Baltika Kaliningrad	13	(1)
2019–2020	FC SKA-Khabarovsk	23	(3)
2020	PFC Dynamo Stavropol	5	(1)
2021	FC Leningradets Leningrad Oblast	11	(1)
2021–2022	FC Saransk	30	(10)
2022–2023	FC Dynamo Saint Petersburg	18	(4)
- * Club domestic league appearances and goals

Ilya Aleksandrovich Kuzmichyov (Russian: Илья Александрович Кузьмичёв; born 10 January 1988) is a Russian former professional football player.

== Club career ==
He made his Russian Football National League debut for FC Khimik Dzerzhinsk on 6 July 2014 in a game against PFC Krylia Sovetov Samara.
