= FC Peresvet Domodedovo =

Russian football team based in Moscow

- Full name: Football Club Peresvet Domodedovo
- Founded: 2016; 9 years ago
- Ground: Avangard
- Capacity: 5503
- Manager: Sergei Lapshin
- League: Russian Amateur Football League
- 2023: Russian Second League, Division B, Group 3, 18th (relegated)
- Website: https://www.xn----dtbiabz0bjkmm.xn--p1ai/

FC Peresvet Domodedovo (Russian: ФК «Пересвет» Домодедово) is a Russian football team. It was originally licensed in the 2021–22 season as based in Podolsk, but played their home games in Domodedovo. It was licensed for the third-tier Russian Second League for the 2021–22 season. They finished in the last place in the 2023 Russian Second League Division B and were relegated to the Russian Amateur Football League.
