= FC Khimik-Avgust Vurnary =

Russian football team based in Vurnary

- Full name: Football Club Khimik-Avgust Vurnary
- Founded: 1994
- Dissolved: 2023
- League: N/A
- 2023: Russian Second League, Division B, Group 4, 2nd
- Website: http://fckhimikavgust.ru/

FC Khimik-Avgust Vurnary (Russian: ФК «Химик-Август») was a Russian football team based in Vurnary, Chuvashia.

== Club history ==
The team began to participate in amateur competitions in 1994. In the 2018–19 season, it first entered the Russian Cup.

For the 2022–23 season, Khimik-August received a professional license for the Russian Second League.

On 22 December 2023, the club announced that the professional team will be abandoned, and only children's football academy will remain under the name.
