= 2023–24 FC Rubin Kazan season =

Rubin Kazan
2023–24 season
- General director: Aleksandr Aybatov
- Head coach: Rashid Rakhimov
- Stadium: Ak Bars Arena
- Premier League: 8th
- Russian Cup: Group stage
- Top goalscorer: League: Mirlind Daku (10); All: Mirlind Daku (10)
- Highest home attendance: 17,806 (5 August 2023 vs Spartak Moscow)
- Lowest home attendance: 2,832 (27 October 2023 vs Balitka)
- Average home league attendance: 6,957 (25 May 2024)
- Biggest win: 2–0 (18 August 2023 vs Krylia Sovetov) (12 November 2023 vs Sochi); 3–1 (11 May 2024 vs Rostov)
- Biggest defeat: 1–4 (5 August 2023 vs Spartak Moscow); 0–3 (12 August 2023 vs Rostov); 0–3 (17 September 2023 vs Zenit)
Home colours	Away colours
- All statistics correct as of 25 May 2024.

The 2023–24 season is the 66th season in the existence of FC Rubin Kazan and marks the club's return to the Russian Premier League after earning promotion and winning the 2022–23 Russian First League. In addition, Rubin Kazan participated in this season's edition of the Russian Cup.

== Squad ==
As of 8 February 2023

No.	Name	Nationality	Position	Date of birth (age)	Signed from	Signed in	Contract ends	2023–24 Season	Goals
Goalkeepers
22	Yury Dyupin	(Russia)	GK	17 March 1988 (age 38)	Anzhi Makhachkala	2019	2023	0	0
50	Yegor Shamov	(Russia)	GK	2 June 1994 (age 32)	FC Arsenal Tula	2023	2025	0	0
66	Nikita Yanovich	(Russia)	GK	28 March 2003 (age 23)	Akademia Rubin	2022	2025	0	0
86	Nikita Korets	(Russia)	GK	25 March 2005 (age 21)	Akademia Rubin	2022	N/A	0	0
Defenders
2	Yegor Teslenko	(Russia)	DF	31 January 2001 (age 25)	KAMAZ Naberezhnye Chelny	2022	2026	0	0
4	Alyaksandr Martynovich	(Belarus)	DF	26 August 1987 (age 39)	Krasnodar	2022	2024	0	0
5	Rustam Ashurmatov	(Uzbekistan)	DF	7 July 1996 (age 30)	Krasnodar	2022	2024	0	0
12	Maksim Shiryayev	(Russia)	DF	13 July 1995 (age 31)	Neftekhimik Nizhnekamsk	2022	2024	0	0
15	Igor Vujačić	(Montenegro) (Serbia)	DF	8 August 1994 (age 32)	Partizan	2023	2025	0	0
26	Uroš Drezgić	(Serbia)	DF	4 October 2002 (age 24)	FK Čukarički	2023	2027	0	0
27	Aleksei Gritsayenko	(Russia)	DF	25 May 1995 (age 31)	Tambov	2021	2024	0	0
31	Maciej Rybus	(Poland)	DF	19 August 1989 (age 37)	Spartak Moscow	2023	2024	0	0
51	Ilya Rozhkov	(Russia)	DF	29 March 2005 (age 21)	Akademia Rubin	2023	2027	0	0
70	Dmitri Kabutov	(Russia)	DF	26 March 1992 (age 34)	Ufa	2022	2025	0	0
Midfielders
6	Ugochukwu Iwu	(Armenia) (Nigeria)	MF	28 October 1999 (age 27)	Urartu	2023	2026	0	0
9	Aleksandr Lomovitsky	(Russia)	MF	27 January 1998 (age 28)	Spartak Moscow	2020	2024	0	0
10	Darko Jevtić	(Switzerland)	MF	8 February 1993 (age 33)	Lech Poznań	2020	2024	0	0
18	Marat Apshatsev	(Russia)	MF	27 May 2001 (age 25)	Tom Tomsk	2021	2026	0	0
19	Oleg Ivanov	(Russia)	MF	4 August 1986 (age 40)	Ufa	2022	2023	0	0
21	Aleksandr Zotov	(Russia)	MF	27 August 1990 (age 36)	Yenisey Krasnoyarsk	222	2024	0	0
23	Ruslan Bezrukov	(Russia)	MF	27 August 1990 (age 36)	Neftekhimik Nizhnekamsk	2022	2026	0	0
24	Nikola Čumić	(Serbia)	MF	20 November 1998 (age 27)	FK Vojvodina	2023	2026	0	1
30	Valentín Vada	(Argentina) (Italy)	MF	6 March 1996 (age 30)	Real Zaragoza	2023	2025	0	0
33	Umarali Rakhmonaliev	(Uzbekistan)	MF	18 August 2003 (age 23)	Bunyodkor	2023	2026	0	0
38	Leon Musayev	(Russia)	MF	25 January 1999 (age 27)	Zenit St.Petersburg	2021	2025	0	0
Forwards
7	Lazar Ranđelović	(Serbia)	FW	5 August 1997 (age 29)	Olympiacos	2023	2026	0	0
11	Kasra Taheri	(Iran)	FW	6 August 2006 (age 20)	Sepahan S.C.	2024	2026	0	0
44	Mirlind Daku	(Kosovo) (Albania)	FW	1 January 1998 (age 28)	NK Osijek	2022	2026	0	0
91	Merabi Uridia	(Russia)	FW	7 April 1993 (age 33)	Neftekhimik Nizhnekamsk	2023	2024	0	1
99	Dardan Shabanhaxhaj	(Austria) (Kosovo)	FW	23 April 2001 (age 25)	Mura	2023	2028	0	0

== Transfers ==
=== In ===
Date	Position	Nationality	Name	From	Fee	Ref.
1 Jul 2023	DF	(Russia)	Ilya Rozhkov	(Russia) Akademia Rubin	Internal	
1 Jul 2023	DF	(Poland)	Maciej Rybus	(Russia) Spartak Moscow	Free transfer	
2 Jul 2023	DF	(Montenegro) (Serbia)	Igor Vujačić	Partizan	€1.00m	
9 Jul 2023	MF	(Russia)	Daniil Rodin	(Russia) Kuban	€10k	
11 Jul 2023	FW	(Kosovo) (Albania)	Mirlind Daku	(Croatia) Osijek	€1.00m	
16 Jul 2023	MF	(Armenia) (Nigeria)	Ugochukwu Iwu	(Armenia) Urartu	€600K	
13 Aug 2023	FW	(Croatia) (Germany)	Marko Cavara	(Slovenia) NK Aluminij	Free Transfer	
8 Sep 2023	DF	(Russia)	Yegor Sorokin	(Serbia) Krasnodar-2	Free Transfer	
14 Sep 2023	DF	(Serbia)	Uroš Drezgić	(Serbia) Čukarički	€1.50m	
14 Sep 2023	MF	(Argentina) (Italy)	Valentín Vada	(Spain) Real Zaragoza	Free Transfer	
14 Sep 2023	GK	(Russia)	Yegor Shamov	(Russia) Arsenal Tula	Free Transfer	
14 Sep 2023	FW	(Serbia)	Nikola Čumić	(Serbia) Vojvodina	€1.50m	
14 Sep 2023	FW	(Serbia)	Lazar Ranđelović	(Greece) Olympiacos	€1.00m	
25 Jan 2024	FW	(Austria) (Kosovo)	Dardan Shabanhaxhaj	(Slovenia) Mura	€1.20m	
19 Feb 2024	FW	(Iran)	Kasra Taheri	(Iran) Sepahan	€35K	

=== Loans in ===
Date from	Position	Nationality	Name	From	Date to	Ref.

=== Out ===
Date	Position	Nationality	Name	To	Fee	Ref.
1 Jul 2023	DF	(Russia)	Ilya Samoshnikov	Lokomotiv Moscow	Free transfer	
1 Jul 2023	MF	(Russia)	Igor Gorbunov	Torpedo Moscow	Free transfer	
1 Jul 2023	GK	(Russia)	Aleksandr Belenov	FC Fakel Voronezh	Free transfer	
4 Jul 2023	FW	(Russia)	Kamil Mullin	Krasnodar-2	Free transfer	
4 Jul 2023	DF	(Russia)	Artyom Popov	Arsenal Tula	Free transfer	
7 Jul 2023	DF	(Iraq)	Ali Adnan	(Iran) Mes Rafsanjan	Free transfer	
12 Jul 2023	MF	(Denmark)	Oliver Abildgaard	(Italy) Como	Free transfer	
26 Jan 2024	MF	(Russia)	Igor Konovalov	SKA-Khabarovsk	Free transfer	

=== Loans out ===
Date from	Position	Nationality	Name	To	Date to	Ref.
5 July 2023	DF	(Russia) (Ukraine)	Konstantin Nizhegorodov	Arsenal Tula	30 June 2024	
10 Jul 2023	MF	(Russia)	Daniil Rodin	KAMAZ	30 June 2024	
3 Aug 2023	FW	(Russia)	Lenar Fattakhov	Kuban Krasnodar	30 June 2024	
4 Aug 2023	DF	(Russia)	Ivan Savitskiy	Rodina Moscow	30 June 2024	
14 Aug 2023	FW	(Croatia) (Germany)	Marko Cavara	FC SKA-Khabarovsk	30 June 2024	
5 Sep 2023	FW	(Russia)	Mikhail Kostyukov	Dynamo Makhachkala	30 June 2024	
14 Sep 2023	FW	(Russia)	Soltmurad Bakayev	Rodina Moscow	30 June 2024	
7 Jan 2024	MF	(Russia)	Daniil Kuznetsov	Rodina Moscow	30 June 2024	
13 Jan 2024	FW	(Belarus)	Vitaly Lisakovich	Baltika Kaliningrad	30 June 2024	
24 Jan 2024	GK	(Russia)	Artyom Ismagilov	Amkar Perm	30 June 2024	
8 Feb 2024	FW	(Ghana)	Joel Fameyeh	Baltika Kaliningrad	30 June 2024	

=== Released ===
Date	Position	Nationality	Name	Joined	Ref.
1 Jul 2023	DF	(Russia)	Elmir Nabiullin	Without Club	
12 Jul 2023	MF	(Russia)	Alan Dzagoev	Without Club	
7 Feb 2024	DF	(Russia)	Yegor Sorokin	Without Club	

== Friendlies ==
=== Pre-season ===
3 July 2023	Rubin Kazan	5–1	KAMAZ	Kazan
	Shiryayev 34'; Zotov 55'; Lisakovich 57'; Lomovitsky 82'; Vujačić 84'	Report	Arustamyan 14'	Stadium: Rubin Stadium

8 July 2023	Torpedo Moscow	1–1	Rubin Kazan	Moscow
	11'	Report	Kabutov 69'	Stadium: Luzhniki Stadium

12 July 2023	Rubin Kazan	0–1	Krylia Sovetov
		Report	Khlusov 17'

12 July 2023	Rubin Kazan	2–1	Krylia Sovetov
	Fameyeh 45', 79'	Report	Garré 64'

=== Mid-season ===
22 January 2024	Rubin Kazan	5–2	(Slovakia) Napredak	Belek, Turkey
	Lomovitsky 27'; Taheri 53'; Daku 59'; Kabutov 65'; Jovanović 89' (o.g.)	Report	Stanojlović 16'; Zličić 32'	Stadium: Regnum Hotel Stadium

26 January 2024	Rubin Kazan	3–1	(Bulgaria) Slavia Sofia	Belek, Turkey
	Milenkovic 55' (o.g.); Ivanov 60'; Chumich 87'	Report	Minchev 77'	Stadium: Regnum Hotel Stadium

1 February 2024	Rubin Kazan	0–1	(Bulgaria) Botev Plovdiv	Antalya, Turkey
		Report	Kajzer 22'	Stadium: Hotel Calista Stadium

3 February 2024	Rubin Kazan	0–2	Volgar	Antalya, Turkey
		Report	Zhamaletdinov 31' (pen.); Lesnikov 41'	Stadium: Hotel Calista Stadium

6 February 2024	Rubin Kazan	1–2	(Bulgaria) Arda	Antalya, Turkey
	Gritasayenko 41'	Report	30'; 38' (pen.)	Stadium: Hotel Calista Stadium

9 February 2024	Rubin Kazan	1–2	St. Pölten	Antalya, Turkey
	Vada 9'	Report	Nitta 49', 60'	Stadium: Hotel Calista Stadium

15 February 2024	Rubin Kazan	2–0	(South Korea) Gangwon	Antalya, Turkey
	Lomovitsky 12'; Daku 56'	Report		Stadium: Hotel Calista Stadium

22 February 2024	Rubin Kazan	1–4	(South Korea) Gangwon	Antalya, Turkey
	Daku 34'	Report		Stadium: Hotel Calista Stadium

== Competitions ==
=== Overall record ===
Competition	First match	Last match	Starting round	Final position	Record							
Competition	First match	Last match	Starting round	Final position	Pld	W	D	L	GF	GA	GD	Win %
Premier League	22 July 2023	3 June 2024	Matchday 1		30	11	9	10	31	38	−7	36.67
Russian Cup	26 July 2023	1 November 2024	Fourth Round	Group Stage	6	1	1	4	3	9	−6	16.67
Total					36	12	10	14	34	47	−13	33.33

Last updated: 25 May 2024
Source: Soccerway

=== Premier League ===
==== League table ====
Pos	Team	Pld	W	D	L	GF	GA	GD	Pts
6	CSKA Moscow	30	12	12	6	56	40	+16	48
7	Rostov	30	12	7	11	43	46	−3	43
8	Rubin Kazan	30	11	9	10	31	38	−7	42
9	Krylia Sovetov Samara	30	11	8	11	46	44	+2	41
10	Akhmat Grozny	30	10	5	15	33	45	−12	35

Source: Premier Liga
Rules for classification: 1) Points; 2) Head-to-head points; 3) Head-to-head matches won; 4) Head-to-head goal difference; 5) Head-to-head goals scored; 6) Matches won; 7) Goal difference; 8) Goals scored; 9) 2022–23 position (not applicable to final standings); 10) Play-off. Note: if teams tied on points played an equal number of head-to-head games, head-to-head results are considered in aggregate, in a separate 'table'. If teams tied on points played a different number of head-to-head games, head-to-head criteria are considered in one-on-one pairs for each team against each other, then the teams are ordered by the number of one-on-one matchups they have advantage in.

==== Premier League Results summary ====
Overall								Home						Away					
Pld	W	D	L	GF	GA	GD	Pts	W	D	L	GF	GA	GD	W	D	L	GF	GA	GD
30	11	9	10	31	38	−7	42	5	6	4	16	19	−3	6	3	6	15	19	−4

As of 25 May 2024

Source: FBref

==== Premier League Results by round ====
Round	1	2	3	4	5	6	7	8	9	10	11	12	13	14	15	16	17	18	19	20	22	23	24	25	21	26	27	28	29	30
Ground	A	H	H	A	H	H	A	H	A	H	A	H	H	A	A	H	A	A	A	H	H	A	A	H	A	H	A	H	A	H
Result	D	D	L	L	W	D	L	L	W	L	W	D	W	W	W	W	L	W	D	L	W	L	L	D	W	D	D	W	L	D
Position	9	10	13	14	12	13	13	14	12	13	10	11	11	9	8	7	8	7	7	8	7	8	8	9	9	9	8	7	8	8

Updated to match(es) played on 25 May 2024. Source: Premier Liga
A = Away; H = Home; W = Win; D = Draw; L = Loss

==== Matches ====
22 July 2023 1	Lokomotiv Moscow	2–2	Rubin Kazan	Moscow
17:30 UTC+03:00	Dzyuba (yellow card) 21'; Tiknizyan 23' (Pinyayev); Isidor 87' (Samoshnikov)	Report	Daku 3' (Rozhkov); Fameyeh 58' (Daku); Gritsayenko (yellow card) 72'	Stadium: RZD Arena; Attendance: 6,721; Referee: Vladislav Bezborodov

29 July 2023 2	Rubin Kazan	1–1	Orenburg	Kazan
TBD UTC+03:00	Fameyeh 35' (Zotov); Iwu (yellow card) 72'	Report	Vera (yellow card) 45+1'; Pérez (yellow card) 56' (goal) 81' (Kaplenko); Goglichidze (yellow card) 90'	Stadium: Ak Bars Arena; Attendance: 4,822; Referee: Vitaly Meshkov

5 August 2023 3	Rubin Kazan	1–4	Spartak Moscow	Kazan
TBD UTC+03:00	Fameyeh (yellow card) 23'; Iwu 39'; Apshatsev (yellow card) 71'; Lisakovich (yellow card) 84'; Gritsayenko (yellow card) 90+1'	Report	Bongonda 19' (Sobolev); Khlusevich (yellow card) 35'; Medina 48' (Denisov); Ignatov 67' (Sobolev); Promes 73' (Martins)	Stadium: Ak Bars Arena; Attendance: 17,806; Referee: Evgeny Kukulyak

12 August 2023 4	Rostov	3–0	Rubin Kazan	Rostov
TBD UTC+03:00	Akbashev (yellow card) 21'; Komlichenko 52' (Vakhaniya); Langovich 78'; Golenkov 88'	Report	Rakhmonaliev (yellow card) 38'; Iwu (yellow card) 81'	Stadium: Rostov Arena; Attendance: 10,328; Referee: Aleksei Eskov

19 August 2023 5	Rubin Kazan	2–1	PFC Krylia Sovetov Samara	Kazan
19:30 UTC+03:00	Gritsayenko 11' (Kabutov); Martynovich 41'; Daku (yellow card) 78'	Report	Garré 15' (Soldatenkov); Saltykov (yellow card) 57'; Bijl (yellow card) 67' (yellow-red card) 89'	Stadium: Ak Bars Arena; Attendance: 5,575; Referee: Sergey Cyganok

26 August 2023 6	Rubin Kazan	2–2	FC Dynamo Moscow	Kazan
17:30 UTC+03:00	Daku 45' (pen.); Vujačić (yellow card) 90+1'; Fameyeh 90+5' (Lisakovich)	Report	Marichal (yellow card) 44' (yellow-red card) 56'; Laxalt (yellow card) 45+2'; Makarov 59' (yellow card) 63'; Skopintsev 73' (Laxalt)	Stadium: Ak Bars Arena; Attendance: 6,948; Referee: Sergey Karasev

2 September 2023 7	Pari NN	2–1	Rubin Kazan	Nizhny Novgorod
15:15 UTC+03:00	Kalinsky 16' (pen.); Aleksandrov (yellow card) 24'; Sevikyan 28' (Kalinsky) (yellow card) 65'	Report	Daku (yellow card) 24'; Gotsuk 50' (o.g.)	Stadium: Nizhny Novgorod Stadium; Attendance: 7,374; Referee: Roman Safjan

16 September 2023 8	Rubin Kazan	0–3	Zenit	Kazan
16:30 UTC+03:00	Kabutov (yellow card) 18'; Zotov (yellow card) 62'	Report	Isidor 8' (Mantuan); Cassierra; Claudinho; Wendel (yellow card) 67'; Sutormin (yellow card) 89'	Stadium: Ak Bars Arena; Attendance: 10,429; Referee: Rafael Shafeev

23 September 2023 9	Fakel	0–1	Rubin Kazan	Voronezh
TBD UTC+03:00	Kvekveskiri (yellow card) 46'; Yakimov (yellow card) 65'; Cele (yellow card) 90+3'; Appayev (yellow card) 90+7'	Report	Rakhmonaliev (yellow card) 41'; Daku (yellow card) 48'; Iwu (yellow card) 56'; Vada 85' (Kabutov); Martynovich (yellow card) 90+7'	Stadium: Tsentralnyi Profsoyuz Stadion; Attendance: 11,763; Referee: Kirill Levnikov

30 September 2023 10	Rubin Kazan	0–2	Krasnodar	Kazan
16:30 UTC+03:00	Gritsayenko (yellow card) 85'	Report	Córdoba 24' (Alonso); Batxi (yellow card) 71'; Olusegun 86' (Córdoba); Akhmetov (yellow card) 90+6'	Stadium: Ak Bars Arena; Attendance: 5,557; Referee: Sergey Cheban

7 October 2023 11	Akhmat Grozny	0–1	Rubin Kazan	Grozny
19:00 UTC+03:00	Konaté (yellow card) 59'; Bogosavac (yellow card) 87'; Camilo (yellow card) 90+7'	Report	Čumić 34' (yellow card) 51'; Vada (yellow card) 87'	Stadium: Akhmat Arena; Attendance: 5,104; Referee: Alexey Sukhoi

21 October 2023 12	Rubin Kazan	0–0	CSKA Moscow	Kazan
14:00 UTC+03:00	Gritsayneko (yellow card) 36'; Daku (yellow card) 46'; Vujačić (yellow card) 62'	Report	Rocha (yellow card) 45'; Chalov (yellow card) 59'; Zabolotny (yellow card) 62'; Mukhin (yellow card) 74'	Stadium: Ak Bars Arena; Attendance: 6,899; Referee: Pavel Kukuyan

27 October 2023 13	Rubin Kazan	1–0	Baltika	Kazan
19:00 UTC+03:00	Kabutov (yellow card) 44'; Vada 88'	Report	Gassama (yellow card) 9'; Radmanovac (yellow card) 54'; Soto (yellow card) 89'; Guzina (yellow card) 90+2'	Stadium: Ak Bars Arena; Attendance: 2,832; Referee: Yan Bobrovskiy

4 November 2023 14	Ural	0–1	Rubin Kazan	Yekaterinburg
16:30 UTC+03:00	Ayupov (yellow card) 81'	Report	Vada 60'; Vujačić (yellow card) 77'; Dyupin (yellow card) 90+7'	Stadium: Yekaterinburg Arena; Attendance: 4,829; Referee: Vasiliy Kazartsev

11 November 2023 15	Sochi	0–2	Rubin Kazan	Sochi
19:00 UTC+03:00	Kravtsov (yellow card) 6' (yellow-red card) 54'; Yusupov (yellow card) 90+5'	Report	Bezrukov 39' (Vada); Daku 66' (Gritsayenko)	Stadium: Fisht Olympic Stadium; Attendance: 2,992; Referee: Sergey Tsyganok

25 November 2023 16	Rubin Kazan	1–0	Fakel	Kazan
16:30 UTC+03:00	Bezrukov 37' (Gritsayenko) (yellow card) 46'; Vada (yellow card) 42'; Čumić (yellow card) 51'	Report	Motpan (yellow card) 78'	Stadium: Ak Bars Arena; Attendance: 3,725; Referee: Evgeny Kukulak

4 December 2023 17	Dynamo Moscow	1–0	Rubin Kazan	Moscow
19:30 UTC+03:00	Tyukavin 25' (Skopintsev)	Report	Martynovich (yellow card) 2'	Stadium: VTB Arena; Attendance: 5,138; Referee: Sergey Tsyganok

10 December 2023 18	Balitka	0–1	Rubin Kazan	Kaliningrad
16:45 UTC+03:00	Radmanovac (yellow card) 18'; Kuzmin (yellow card) 23'	Report	Daku 7' (Vujačić); Gritsayenko (yellow card) 37'	Stadium: Kaliningrad Stadium; Attendance: 6,099; Referee: Vladislav Bezborodov

2 March 2024 19	Krasnodar	1–1	Rubin Kazan	Krasnodar
16:30 UTC+03:00	Olusegun 36' (Alonso); Spertsyan (yellow card) 66'; Sá (yellow card) 85'; Alonso (yellow card) 90+6'	Report	Ashurmatov 90' (Vada)	Stadium: Krasnodar Stadium; Attendance: 27,019; Referee: Aleksey Sukhoy

9 March 2024 20	Rubin Kazan	0–1	Nizhny Novgorod	Kazan
16:30 UTC+03:00	Daku (yellow card) 70'	Report	Troshechkin 5' (Gotsuk); Kalinsky (yellow card) 35'; Nigmatullin (yellow card) 90+1'	Stadium: Ak Bars Arena; Attendance: 6,595; Referee: Sergey Tsyganok

30 March 2024 22	Rubin Kazan	2–1	Akhmat Grozny	Kazan
16:30 UTC+03:00	Ranđelović 12' (Daku); Daku 35' (yellow card) 66'; Ashurmatov (yellow card) 90+4'	Report	Timofeyev (yellow card) 25'; Lovat 90+3' (Shvets)	Stadium: Ak Bars Arena; Attendance: 5,024; Referee: Vitali Meshkov

8 April 2024 23	Orenburg	3–0	Rubin Kazan	Orenburg
16:00 UTC+03:00	Vorobyov 58' (Goglichidze) (yellow card) 65'; Florentín (yellow card) 82'; Khotulyov 87' (Bašić); Marín 89' (Mansilla) (yellow card) 89'	Report	Zotov (yellow card) 85'	Stadium: Gazovik Stadium; Attendance: 3,510; Referee: Vladislav Bezborodov

14 April 2024 24	Krylya Sovetov	2–0	Rubin Kazan	Samara
18:00 UTC+03:00	Gorshkov 9' (yellow card) 28'; Vityugov (yellow card) 34'; Fernando Costanza (yellow card) 76'Khubulov 90+6' (Yezhov)	Report	Iwu (yellow card) 8'; Vujačić (yellow card) 24'; Ranđelović (yellow card) 26'; Vada (yellow card) 34'; Kabutov (yellow card) 45'	Stadium: Solidarnost Arena; Attendance: 7,909; Referee: Roman Galimov

20 April 2024 25	Rubin Kazan	1–1	Lokomotiv Moscow	Kazan
16:30 UTC+03:00	Vada 21' (Daku); Gritsayenko (yellow card) 51'; Ashurmatov (red card) 76'	Report	Morozov (yellow card) 14'; Silyanov (yellow card) 26'; Barinov 43' (Glushenkov); Tiknizyan (yellow card) 45+1'	Stadium: Ak Bars Arena; Attendance: 9,272; Referee: Yevgeni Kukulyak

24 April 2024 21	Zenit	0–2	Rubin Kazan	Moscow
18:00 UTC+03:00	Eraković (yellow card) 69'; Mostovoy (yellow card) 86'	Report	Daku 50' (Zotov); Martynovich 67' (Daku); Dyupin (yellow card) 90+6'; Rybus (yellow card) 90+6'; Gritsayenko (yellow card) 90+8'	Stadium: Gazprom Arena; Attendance: 13,037; Referee: Artem Chistyakov

29 April 2024 26	Rubin Kazan	1–1	Ural Yekaterinburg	Kazan
14:15 UTC+03:00	Zotov (yellow card) 23'; Daku 43' (Rozhkov)Martynovich (yellow card) 83'	Report	Gazinsky (yellow card) 33'; Filipenko (yellow card) 51'; Miškić (yellow card) 67'; Begić (yellow card) 69' (goal) 86' (Yegorychev)	Stadium: Ak Bars Arena; Attendance: 5,804; Referee: Yevgeny Bulanov

6 May 2024 27	CSKA Moscow	2–2	Rubin Kazan	Moscow
19:30 UTC+03:00	Fayzullaev 45+1' (Khellven); Willyan Rocha (yellow card) 57'; Chalov 74'	Report	Rozhkov 42'; Zotov (yellow card) 60'; Rybus (yellow card) 65'; Daku 90+2' (Lomovitsky)	Stadium: VEB Arena; Attendance: 5,740; Referee: Vladislav Bezborodov

11 May 2024 28	Rubin Kazan	3–1	Rostov	Kazan
13:00 UTC+03:00	Rybus 30'; Martynovich 38' (Kabutov); Jočić	Report	El Askalany (yellow card) 63' (yellow-red card) 86'; Shchetinin 73' (Osipenko); Komarov (yellow card) 74' (yellow-red card) 75'; Osipenko (penalty missed) 81'	Stadium: Ak Bars Arena; Attendance: 5,666; Referee: Artem Lyubimov

19 May 2024 29	Spartak Moscow	3–1	Rubin Kazan	Moscow
13:15 UTC+03:00	Umyarov (yellow card) 5'; Bongonda 20' (Martins); Zobnin 28' (Khlusevich) (yellow card) 86'; Martins 63' (Prutsev); Khlusevich (yellow card) 78'; Chernov (yellow card) 80'	Report	Rozhkov (yellow card) 71'; Teslenko (yellow card) 73'; Daku 77' (Shabanhaxhaj)	Stadium: Lukoil Arena; Attendance: 17,881; Referee: Vladimir Moskalyov

25 May 2024 30	Rubin Kazan	1–1	Sochi	Kazan
15:30 UTC+03:00	Daku 22' (Vada); Kabutov (yellow card) 75'; Rozhkov (yellow card) 90'	Report	Zaika (yellow card) 42'; Drkušić (yellow card) 45+1'; Burmistrov (yellow card) 73'; Marcelo Alves (yellow card) 84'; Guarirapa 87'	Stadium: Ak Bars Arena; Attendance: 7,399; Referee: Yegor Yegorov

=== Russian Cup ===
Pos	Team	Pld	W	PW	PL	L	GF	GA	GD	Pts	Qualification
1	Lokomotiv Moscow	6	4	0	1	1	10	4	+6	13	Qualification to the Knockout phase (RPL path)
2	Rostov	6	3	1	0	2	7	7	0	11	Qualification to the Knockout phase (RPL path)
3	Ural Yekaterinburg	6	2	1	0	3	6	6	0	8	Qualification to the Knockout phase (regions path)
4	Rubin Kazan	6	1	0	1	4	3	9	−6	4	

Source: Russian Football Union (in Russian), Soccerway
Rules for classification: 1) Points; 2) Head-to-head points; 3) Head-to-head matches won; 4) Head-to-head goal difference; 5) Head-to-head goals scored; 6) Matches won; 7) Goal difference; 8) Goals scored; 9) Penalty shoot-out goal difference; 10) Draw.

26 July 2023 Group Stage	Rostov	1–0	Rubin Kazan	Rostov-on-Don
20:45 MSK	Shchetinin (yellow card) 28'; Mironov (yellow card) 50'; Komarov 59'; Melyokhin (yellow card) 90+4'	Report	Bezrukov (yellow card) 38'	Stadium: Rostov Arena; Attendance: 10,429; Referee: Yevgeniy Bulanov

8 August 2023 Group Stage	Rubin Kazan	0–1	Lokomotiv Moscow	Kazan
18:30 MSK	Lisakovich (yellow card) 29'; Vujačić (yellow card) 45+1'; Rakhmonaliev (yellow card) 48'; Teslenko (yellow card) 73'; Ashurmatov (yellow card) 85'	Report	Miranchuk (yellow card) 10'; Samoshnikov (yellow card) 17'; Barinov (yellow card) 54'; Sarveli 63'	Stadium: Ak Bars Arena; Attendance: 9,243; Referee: Vladimir Moskalyov

29 August 2023 Group Stage	Rubin Kazan	2–1	Ural Yekaterinburg	Kazan
15:00 MSK	Ashurmatov 10' (Konovalov) (yellow card) 85'; Teslenko 30' (yellow card) 51'; Lisakovich (yellow card) 41'; Shiryayev (yellow card) 90+2'	Report	Mamin (yellow card) 29'; Kashtanov 35' (Yegorychev); Beveyev (yellow card) 90+5'	Stadium: Ak Bars Arena; Attendance: 4,112; Referee: Jan Bobrovsky

20 September 2023 Group Stage	Rubin Kazan	1–1 (2–4 p)	Rostov	Kazan
17:15 MSK	Apshatsev 49' (Čumić); Drezgić (yellow card) 45'	Report	Ignatov 27'; Langovich (yellow card) 72'	Stadium: Ak Bars Arena; Referee: Sergei Cheban
	Penalties
	Rakhmonaliev (penalty missed); Vujačić (penalty scored); Konovalov (penalty scored); Drezgić (penalty missed)		(penalty scored) Tugarev; (penalty scored) Golenkov; (penalty scored) Shchetinin; (penalty scored) Ignatov

3 October 2023 Group Stage	Ural Yekaterinburg	1–0	Rubin Kazan	Yekaterinburg
15:00 MSK	Filipenko (yellow card) 25'; Yegorychev 40'; Bicfalvi 56'	Report	Fameyeh (yellow card) 45+1'; Apshatsev (yellow card) 70'	Stadium: Yekaterinburg Arena; Attendance: 7,371; Referee: Evgeny Turbin

1 Nov 2023 Group Stage	Lokomotiv Moscow	3–0	Rubin Kazan	Moscow
18:30 MSK	Tiknizyan 9'; Miranchuk 26' (yellow card) 45'; Sarveli 37' (yellow card) 61'; Khudyakov (yellow card) 40'	Report	Fameyeh (yellow card) 22'	Stadium: RZD Arena; Attendance: 8,166; Referee: Vera Opeikina

== Squad statistics ==
As of Complete

=== Appearances and goals ===
No.	Pos	Nat	Player	Total		Premier League		Russian Cup	
No.	Pos	Nat	Player	Apps	Goals	Apps	Goals	Apps	Goals
2	DF	(Russia) RUS	Yegor Teslenko	13	1	6+4	0	3	1
4	DF	(Belarus) BLR	Alyaksandr Martynovich	22	3	19+1	3	1+1	0
5	DF	(Uzbekistan) UZB	Rustam Ashurmatov	19	2	8+6	1	5	1
6	MF	(Armenia) ARM	Ugochukwu Iwu	28	1	24+2	1	0+2	0
7	FW	(Serbia) SRB	Lazar Ranđelović	23	1	15+6	1	1+1	0
8	MF	(Serbia) SRB	Bogdan Jočić	4	1	2+2	1	0	0
9	MF	(Russia) RUS	Aleksandr Lomovitsky	17	0	5+9	0	2+1	0
10	MF	(Switzerland) SUI	Darko Jevtić	2	0	0+2	0	0	0
11	MF	(Iran) IRI	Kasra Taheri	2	0	0+2	0	0	0
12	DF	(Russia) RUS	Maksim Shiryayev	3	0	0	0	3	0
15	DF	(Montenegro) MNE	Igor Vujačić	32	0	28	0	2+2	0
18	MF	(Russia) RUS	Marat Apshatsev	14	1	3+5	0	4+2	1
19	MF	(Russia) RUS	Oleg Ivanov	12	0	1+9	0	2	0
20	FW	(Ghana) GHA	Joel Fameyeh	20	3	8+7	3	3+2	0
21	MF	(Russia) RUS	Aleksandr Zotov	29	0	19+7	0	2+1	0
22	GK	(Russia) RUS	Yury Dyupin	29	0	29	0	0	0
23	MF	(Russia) RUS	Ruslan Bezrukov	24	2	15+4	2	4+1	0
24	FW	(Serbia) SRB	Nikola Čumić	14	1	9+2	1	1+2	0
25	MF	(Russia) RUS	Igor Konovalov	4	0	0+1	0	3	0
26	DF	(Serbia) SRB	Uroš Drezgić	2	0	0	0	2	0
27	DF	(Russia) RUS	Aleksei Gritsayenko	32	1	29	1	2+1	0
30	MF	(Argentina) ARG	Valentín Vada	21	4	17+3	4	0+1	0
31	DF	(Poland) POL	Maciej Rybus	8	1	3+4	1	1	0
33	MF	(Uzbekistan) UZB	Umarali Rakhmonaliev	17	0	7+4	0	4+2	0
44	FW	(Albania) ALB	Mirlind Daku	33	10	28	10	0+5	0
50	GK	(Russia) RUS	Yegor Shamov	3	0	1	0	2	0
51	DF	(Russia) RUS	Ilya Rozhkov	21	1	15+3	1	1+2	0
66	GK	(Russia) RUS	Nikita Yanovich	4	0	0	0	4	0
70	DF	(Russia) RUS	Dmitri Kabutov	30	0	28	0	1+1	0
80	DF	(Russia) RUS	Yegor Sorokin	2	0	0	0	2	0
91	FW	(Russia) RUS	Merabi Uridia	9	0	0+4	0	5	0
99	FW	(Austria) AUT	Dardan Shabanhaxhaj	10	0	5+5	0	0	0
Players away from the club on loan:
7	MF	(Russia) RUS	Soltmurad Bakayev	3	0	0+1	0	1+1	0
8	FW	(Russia) RUS	Vitaly Lisakovich	7	0	2+3	0	2	0
11	MF	(Russia) RUS	Daniil Kuznetsov	8	0	3	0	3+2	0
Players who left Rubin Kazan during the season:

=== Goal scorers ===
Place	Position	Nation	Number	Name	Premier League	Russian Cup	Total
1	FW	(Kosovo)	44	Mirlind Daku	10	0	10
2	MF	(Argentina) (Italy)	30	Valentín Vada	4	0	4
3	FW	(Ghana)	20	Joel Fameyeh	3	0	3
3	DF	(Belarus)	4	Alyaksandr Martynovich	3	0	3
5	MF	(Russia)	23	Ruslan Bezrukov	2	0	2
5	DF	(Uzbekistan)	5	Rustam Ashurmatov	1	1	2
7	MF	(Armenia) (Nigeria)	6	Ugochukwu Iwu	1	0	1
7	DF	(Russia)	27	Aleksei Gritsayenko	1	0	1
7	DF	(Russia)	2	Yegor Teslenko	0	1	1
7	MF	(Russia)	18	Marat Apshatsev	0	1	1
7	MF	(Serbia)	24	Nikola Čumić	1	0	1
7	FW	(Serbia)	7	Lazar Ranđelović	1	0	1
7	DF	(Russia)	51	Ilya Rozhkov	0	1	1
7	MF	(Serbia)	8	Bogdan Jočić	1	0	1
7	DF	(Poland)	31	Maciej Rybus	1	0	1
				Opponent Own goal	1	0	1
				TOTALS	30	3	33

=== Assists ===
Place	Position	Nation	Number	Name	Premier League	Russian Cup	Total
1	FW	(Kosovo) (Albania)	44	Mirlind Daku	4	0	4
2	DF	(Russia)	70	Dmitri Kabutov	3	0	3
2	MF	(Argentina)	30	Valentín Vada	3	0	3
4	DF	(Russia)	27	Aleksei Gritsayenko	2	0	2
4	MF	(Russia)	21	Aleksandr Zotov	2	0	2
4	DF	(Russia)	51	Ilya Rozhkov	2	0	2
7	FW	(Belarus)	8	Vitaly Lisakovich	1	0	1
7	MF	(Russia)	25	Igor Konovalov	0	1	1
7	FW	(Serbia)	24	Nikola Čumić	0	1	1
7	DF	(Montenegro) (Serbia)	15	Igor Vujačić	1	0	1
7	MF	(Russia)	9	Aleksandr Lomovitsky	0	1	1
7	FW	(Austria)	99	Dardan Shabanhaxhaj	1	0	1
				TOTALS	20	2	22

=== Clean sheets ===
Place	Position	Nation	Number	Name	Premier League	Russian Cup	Total
1	GK	(Russia)	22	Yury Dyupin	9	0	9
				TOTALS	9	0	9

=== Disciplinary record ===
Number	Position	Nation	Name	Premier League			Russian Cup			Total		
Number	Position	Nation	Name	Yellow card	(yellow card) (yellow-red card)	Red card	Yellow card	(yellow card) (yellow-red card)	Red card	Yellow card	(yellow card) (yellow-red card)	Red card
2	DF	(Russia)	Yegor Teslenko	1	0	0	2	0	0	3	0	0
4	DF	(Belarus)	Alyaksandr Martynovich	3	0	0	0	0	0	3	0	0
5	DF	(Uzbekistan)	Rustam Ashurmatov	1	0	1	2	0	0	3	0	1
6	MF	(Armenia)	Ugochukwu Iwu	4	0	0	0	0	0	4	0	0
7	MF	(Serbia)	Lazar Ranđelović	1	0	0	0	0	0	1	0	0
8	FW	(Belarus)	Vitaly Lisakovich	1	0	0	2	0	0	3	0	0
12	DF	(Russia)	Maksim Shiryayev	0	0	0	1	0	0	1	0	0
15	DF	(Montenegro) (Serbia)	Igor Vujačić	4	0	0	1	0	0	5	0	0
18	MF	(Russia)	Marat Apshatsev	1	0	0	0	1	0	2	0	0
20	FW	(Ghana)	Joel Fameyeh	1	0	0	3	0	0	4	0	0
21	MF	(Russia)	Aleksandr Zotov	4	0	0	0	0	0	4	0	0
22	GK	(Russia)	Yuri Dyupin	2	0	0	0	0	0	2	0	0
23	MF	(Russia)	Ruslan Bezrukov	1	0	0	1	0	0	2	0	0
24	MF	(Serbia)	Nikola Čumić	2	0	0	0	0	0	2	0	0
26	DF	(Serbia)	Uroš Drezgić	0	0	0	1	0	0	1	0	0
27	DF	(Russia)	Aleksei Gritsayenko	7	0	0	0	0	0	7	0	0
30	MF	(Argentina) (Italy)	Valentín Vada	3	0	0	0	0	0	3	0	0
31	DF	(Poland)	Maciej Rybus	2	0	0	0	0	0	2	0	0
33	MF	(Uzbekistan)	Umarali Rakhmonaliev	2	0	0	1	0	0	3	0	0
44	FW	(Kosovo) (Albania)	Mirlind Daku	6	0	0	0	0	0	6	0	0
51	DF	(Russia)	Ilya Rozhkov	2	0	0	0	0	0	2	0	0
70	DF	(Russia)	Dmitri Kabutov	4	0	0	0	0	0	4	0	0
Total				53	0	1	13	0	0	66	0	1

== Home attendance ==
As of match 25 May 2024

Competition	Total	Games	Average
Premier League	104,353	15	6,957
Russian Cup	13,355	2	6,678
Total	117,708	17	6,924
