= Enri Mukba =

Russian footballer (born 2005)

Personal information
- Full name: Enri Raulyevich Mukba
- Date of birth: 22 September 2005 (age 21)
- Place of birth: Gudauta, Abkhazia, Georgia
- Height: 1.89 m (6 ft 2 in)
- Positions: Right winger; right back

Team information
- Current team: Neftekhimik Nizhnekamsk (on loan from Rubin Kazan)
- Number: 12

Youth career
- –2020: Ritsa
- 2023: Rubin Kazan

Senior career*
Years	Team	Apps	(Gls)
2020–2022	Ritsa (CONIFA)		
2024–	Rubin Kazan	2	(0)
2024–	→ Rubin-2 Kazan	26	(3)
2026–	→ Neftekhimik Nizhnekamsk (loan)	0	(0)
- * Club domestic league appearances and goals as of 17 May 2026

Enri Raulyevich Mukba (Russian: Энри Раульевич Мукба; born 22 September 2005) is a Russian football player who plays as a right back or right winger for Neftekhimik Nizhnekamsk on loan from Rubin Kazan.

== Career ==
Mukba made his debut in the Russian Premier League for Rubin Kazan on 20 October 2024 in a game against Dynamo Moscow. Rubin's manager Rashid Rakhimov chose him to start the game as a right back due to several defenders being unavailable, even though Mukba never played in defense in an official game before in his career, and primarily plays as a right winger. He was substituted in the first half, after conceding a penalty kick for a handball.

On 2 July 2026, Mukba was loaned to Neftekhimik Nizhnekamsk for the 2026–27 season.

== Career statistics ==
As of 17 May 2026

Club	Season	League			Cup		Total	
Club	Season	Division	Apps	Goals	Apps	Goals	Apps	Goals
Rubin-2 Kazan	2024	Russian Second League B	15	3	–		15	3
Rubin-2 Kazan	2025	Russian Second League B	8	0	–		8	0
Rubin-2 Kazan	2025	Russian Second League B	3	0	–		3	0
Rubin-2 Kazan	Total		26	3	0	0	26	3
Rubin Kazan	2024–25	Russian Premier League	1	0	0	0	1	0
Rubin Kazan	2025–26	Russian Premier League	1	0	2	0	3	0
Rubin Kazan	Total		2	0	2	0	4	0
Career total			28	3	2	0	30	3
