= Nikita Vasilyev =

Nikita Vasilyev may refer to:

- Nikita Vasilyev (footballer, born 1992), Russian footballer
- Nikita Vasilyev (footballer, born 2006), Russian footballer
