= Nikita Vasilyev (footballer, born 2006) =

Russian footballer

Personal information
- Full name: Nikita Alekseyevich Vasilyev
- Date of birth: 14 December 2006 (age 19)
- Place of birth: Kazan, Russia
- Height: 1.75 m (5 ft 9 in)
- Position: Defensive midfielder

Team information
- Current team: Neftekhimik Nizhnekamsk (on loan from Rubin Kazan)
- Number: 96

Youth career
- 2012–2023: Rubin Kazan

Senior career*
Years	Team	Apps	(Gls)
2024–	Rubin Kazan	4	(0)
2024–	→ Rubin-2 Kazan	29	(6)
2026–	→ Neftekhimik Nizhnekamsk (loan)	0	(0)

International career^{‡}
2025	Russia U-20	2	(1)
- * Club domestic league appearances and goals as of 30 May 2026 ‡ National team caps and goals as of 7 June 2025

Nikita Alekseyevich Vasilyev (Russian: Никита Алексеевич Васильев; born 14 December 2006) is a Russian football player who plays as a defensive midfielder or attacking midfielder for Neftekhimik Nizhnekamsk on loan from Rubin Kazan.

== Career ==
Vasilyev made his debut for the main squad of Rubin Kazan on 30 July 2024 in a Russian Cup game against Akron Tolyatti.

He made his Russian Premier League debut for Rubin on 16 March 2025 against Pari Nizhny Novgorod.

On 10 June 2026, Vasilyev moved on loan to Neftekhimik Nizhnekamsk for the 2026–27 season.

== Career statistics ==
As of 30 May 2026

Club	Season	League			Cup		Total	
Club	Season	Division	Apps	Goals	Apps	Goals	Apps	Goals
Rubin-2 Kazan	2024	Russian Second League B	18	4	–		18	4
Rubin-2 Kazan	2025	Russian Second League B	5	1	–		5	1
Rubin-2 Kazan	2026	Russian Second League B	6	1	–		6	1
Rubin-2 Kazan	Total		29	6	0	0	29	6
Rubin Kazan	2024–25	Russian Premier League	3	0	3	0	6	0
Rubin Kazan	2025–26	Russian Premier League	1	0	2	0	3	0
Rubin Kazan	Total		4	0	5	0	9	0
Career total			33	6	5	0	38	6
