= Bogdan Jočić =

Serbian footballer

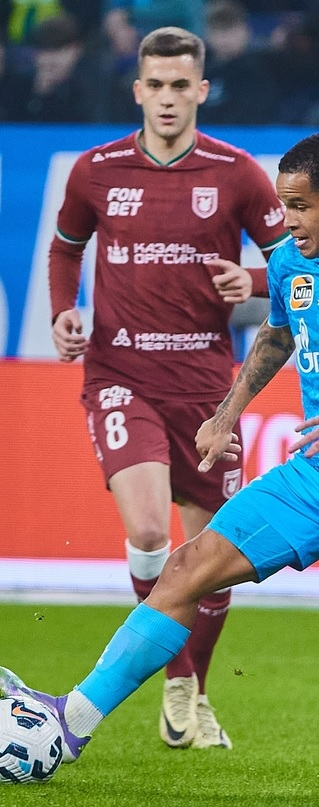
- Jočić with Rubin in 2025

Personal information
- Date of birth: 11 January 2001 (age 25)
- Place of birth: Belgrade, Serbia, FR Yugoslavia
- Height: 1.84 m (6 ft 0 in)
- Position: Attacking midfielder

Team information
- Current team: Rubin Kazan
- Number: 8

Youth career
- 2009–2019: Red Star Belgrade
- 2019–2021: Hellas Verona

Senior career*
Years	Team	Apps	(Gls)
2019	Red Star Belgrade	0	(0)
2019	→ Grafičar Beograd (loan)	3	(0)
2020–2022	Hellas Verona	0	(0)
2021	→ Metalac Gornji Milanovac (loan)	5	(0)
2022	→ Pro Vercelli (loan)	4	(0)
2022–2024	Voždovac	41	(4)
2024–	Rubin Kazan	50	(4)

International career^{‡}
2017–2018	Serbia U17	6	(1)
2019	Serbia U18	3	(1)
2019	Serbia U19	6	(0)
2021	Serbia U20	1	(0)
- * Club domestic league appearances and goals as of 21 November 2026 ‡ National team caps and goals as of 6 September 2021

Bogdan Jočić (Serbian Cyrillic: Богдан Јочић; born 11 January 2001) is a Serbian football player who plays as an attacking midfielder for Russian club Rubin Kazan.

== Club career ==
On 21 February 2024, Jočić signed a four-and-a-half-year contract with the Russian Premier League club Rubin Kazan.

He made his RPL debut for Rubin on 2 March 2024 in a game against Krasnodar. He scored his first league goal for Rubin on 11 May 2024 against Rostov.

== International career ==
Jočić represented Serbia at the 2018 UEFA European Under-17 Championship.

== Career statistics ==
=== Club ===
As of match played 21 November 2026

Appearances and goals by club, season and competition
Club	Season	League			Cup		Other		Total	
Club	Season	Division	Apps	Goals	Apps	Goals	Apps	Goals	Apps	Goals
Red Star Belgrade	2018–19	Serbian SuperLiga	0	0	0	0	—		0	0
Grafičar Beograd (loan)	2019–20	Serbian SuperLiga	3	0	—		—		3	0
Hellas Verona	2020–21	Serie A	0	0	0	0	—		0	0
Metalac Gornji Milanovac (loan)	2021–22	Serbian SuperLiga	5	0	1	0	—		6	0
Pro Vercelli	2021–22	Serie C	4	0	0	0	0	0	4	0
Voždovac	2022–23	Serbian SuperLiga	22	1	0	0	—		22	1
Voždovac	2023–24	Serbian SuperLiga	19	3	1	1	—		20	4
Voždovac	Total		41	4	1	1	—		42	5
Rubin Kazan	2023–24	Russian Premier League	6	1	—		—		6	1
Rubin Kazan	2024–25	Russian Premier League	15	2	5	0	—		20	2
Rubin Kazan	2025–26	Russian Premier League	20	0	3	0	—		23	0
Rubin Kazan	2026–27	Russian Premier League	9	1	2	0	—		11	1
Rubin Kazan	Total		50	4	10	0	—		60	4
Career total			103	8	12	1	0	0	115	9
