= Daniil Kuznetsov =

Russian footballer

Personal information
- Full name: Daniil Andreyevich Kuznetsov
- Date of birth: 23 April 2003 (age 23)
- Place of birth: Saint Petersburg, Russia
- Height: 1.82 m (6 ft 0 in)
- Position: Forward

Team information
- Current team: Rubin Kazan
- Number: 44

Youth career
- 2019–2021: Zenit St. Petersburg

Senior career*
Years	Team	Apps	(Gls)
2021–2022	Zenit-2 St. Petersburg	9	(3)
2021–2022	Zenit St. Petersburg	4	(0)
2022–	Rubin Kazan	29	(1)
2024	→ Rodina Moscow (loan)	12	(2)
2024–2025	→ Ural Yekaterinburg (loan)	5	(1)

International career^{‡}
2019	Russia U-16	2	(0)
2021	Russia U-18	4	(0)
2021	Russia U-19	2	(0)
- * Club domestic league appearances and goals as of 24 October 2026 ‡ National team caps and goals as of 4 September 2021

Daniil Andreyevich Kuznetsov (Russian: Дании́л Андре́евич Кузнецо́в; born 23 April 2003) is a Russian football player who plays as a winger (on left or right side) for Rubin Kazan.

== Club career ==
He made his debut in the Russian Premier League for Zenit St. Petersburg on 11 September 2021 in a game against Akhmat Grozny. He made his European debut on 2 November 2021 in a Champions League game against Juventus.

On 20 February 2022, Kuznetsov signed a five-year contract with Rubin Kazan.

On 7 January 2024, Kuznetsov moved to Rodina Moscow on loan. On 27 December 2024, Kuznetsov was loaned to Ural Yekaterinburg.

== International career ==
Kuznetsov was first called up to the Russia national football team for September 2023 camp.

== Honours ==
=== Club ===
Zenit Saint Petersburg

- Russian Premier League: 2021–22

== Career statistics ==
=== Club ===
As of match played 24 October 2026

Appearances and goals by club, season and competition
Club	Season	League			Cup		Europe		Total	
Club	Season	Division	Apps	Goals	Apps	Goals	Apps	Goals	Apps	Goals
Zenit-2 St. Petersburg	2020–21	Russian Second League	1	0	—		—		1	0
Zenit-2 St. Petersburg	2021–22	Russian Second League	8	3	—		—		8	3
Zenit-2 St. Petersburg	Total		9	3	0	0	0	0	9	3
Zenit St. Petersburg	2021–22	Russian Premier League	4	0	0	0	1 (Note: Appearance in the UEFA Champions League)	0	5	0
Rubin Kazan	2021–22	Russian Premier League	8	0	1	0	0	0	9	0
Rubin Kazan	2022–23	Russian First League	1	0	0	0	—		1	0
Rubin Kazan	2023–24	Russian Premier League	3	0	5	0	—		8	0
Rubin Kazan	2024–25	Russian Premier League	1	0	5	2	—		6	2
Rubin Kazan	2025–26	Russian Premier League	8	1	0	0	—		8	1
Rubin Kazan	2026–27	Russian Premier League	8	0	3	0	—		11	0
Rubin Kazan	Total		29	1	14	2	0	0	43	3
Rodina Moscow (loan)	2023–24	Russian First League	12	2	0	0	—		12	2
Ural Yekaterinburg (loan)	2024–25	Russian First League	5	1	1	0	—		6	1
Career total			59	7	15	2	1	0	75	9

== Honours ==
Zenit Saint Petersburg

- Russian Premier League: 2021–22
