= Dardan Shabanhaxhaj =

Kosovar footballer

Personal information
- Date of birth: 23 April 2001 (age 25)
- Place of birth: Graz, Austria
- Height: 1.83 m (6 ft 0 in)
- Position: Winger

Team information
- Current team: Rubin Kazan
- Number: 99

Youth career
- 2007–2009: Grazer AK
- 2009–2010: AKA HIB Liebenau
- 2010–2014: Grazer AK
- 2014–2019: Sturm Graz

Senior career*
Years	Team	Apps	(Gls)
2019–2021	Sturm Graz II	22	(4)
2020–2023	Sturm Graz	17	(0)
2021–2022	→ Kapfenberger SV (loan)	23	(6)
2022–2023	→ Mura (loan)	25	(1)
2023–2024	Mura	19	(7)
2024–	Rubin Kazan	57	(7)

International career^{‡}
2017	Kosovo U16	2	(0)
2021	Austria U21	2	(0)
2026–	Kosovo	1	(0)
- * Club domestic league appearances and goals as of 21 November 2026 ‡ National team caps and goals as of 20:00, 7 June 2026 (UTC)

Dardan Shabanhaxhaj (born 23 April 2001) is a professional footballer who plays as a winger for Russian Premier League club Rubin Kazan.

Shabanhaxhaj began his career with Grazer AK before joining the academy of Sturm Graz. He started his senior career with Sturm Graz II and later made appearances for the first team. During his time with Sturm Graz, he had loan spells at Kapfenberger SV and Slovenian club Mura. After a successful period in Slovenia, Mura signed him permanently in 2023. In 2024, he moved to Russian side Rubin Kazan.

A former Kosovo under-16 international, Shabanhaxhaj represented the Austria under-21 team in a pair of friendlies before switching back to represent the Kosovo national team.

== Club career ==
=== Early career and Sturm Graz II ===
Shabanhaxhaj began his senior career with Grazer AK, where he played until December 2009, when he joined AKA HIB Liebenau and after one season, he returned to Grazer AK. Ahead of the 2014–15 season, he joined the youth academy of Sturm Graz, where from the 2015–16 season, he also played for the academy teams, progressing through all age groups.

On 26 July 2019, Shabanhaxhaj made his debut for Sturm Graz's reserve team in a 3–1 away win against Gleisdorf 09 in the Austrian Regionalliga Central after coming on as a substitute in the 84th minute in place of Sebastian Zettl. Three weeks later, he scored his first goal for Sturm Graz's reserve team in his fourth appearance for the club in a 2–1 home win over Wolfsberger AC's reserve team in the Austrian Regionalliga Central.

=== Sturm Graz ===
On 16 February 2020, Shabanhaxhaj was named as a Sturm Graz substitute for the first time in an Austrian Bundesliga match against SV Mattersburg. On 7 May 2020, he signed a three-year contract with Sturm Graz and received squad number 33. His debut with Sturm Graz came on 28 June 2020 against Rapid Wien after coming on as a substitute at 84th minute in place of Jakob Jantscher.

==== Loan to Kapfenberger SV ====
On 16 August 2021, Sturm Graz announced the loan of Shabanhaxhaj to Austrian Second League club Kapfenberger SV. His debut with Kapfenberger SV came six days later against his former youth club Grazer AK after coming on as a substitute at 46th minute in place of Sanel Bajrektarević.

=== Mura ===
On 9 June 2022, Shabanhaxhaj joined Slovenian PrvaLiga side Mura, on a season-long loan. His debut with Mura came a month later in the 2022–23 UEFA Europa Conference League first qualifying round against Sfîntul Gheorghe after coming on as a substitute at 61st minute in place of Nikola Petković.

On 21 June 2023, the clubs agreed on a permanent transfer and Shabanhaxhaj signed a three-year contract with Mura.

=== Rubin Kazan ===
On 25 January 2024, Shabanhaxhaj signed a four-and-a-half-year contract with Russian Premier League club Rubin Kazan and received squad number 99. His debut with Rubin Kazan came five weeks later against Krasnodar after being named in the starting line-up.

== International career ==
=== Kosovo ===
On 2 January 2017, Shabanhaxhaj received a call-up from Kosovo U16 for a four-day training camp in Durrës, ahead of the start of the 2017 Mercedes-Benz Aegean Cup. His debut with Kosovo came fourteen days later in the 2017 Mercedes-Benz Aegean Cup match against Turkey after being named in the starting line-up.

=== Austria ===
On 17 March 2021, Shabanhaxhaj received a call-up from Austria U21 for the friendly matches against Saudi Arabia and Poland. His debut with Austria came ten days later in the friendly match against Saudi Arabia after coming on as a substitute in the 60th minute in place of Romano Schmid and providing an assist for his side's ninth goal in a 10–0 home win.

=== Proposed Albania switch and Kosovo return ===
In May 2025, after five years of absence from international football and following his move to Rubin Kazan, where he became a teammate of former Kosovo and later Albania international Mirlind Daku, there were reports that Shabanhaxhaj might switch his allegiance to Albania through Daku's mediation.

In March 2026, Shabanhaxhaj was planned to be called up from Kosovo for the 2026 FIFA World Cup qualification play-offs, but due to an injury, he was unable to join the national team.

== Career statistics ==
=== Club ===
As of 21 November 2026

Appearances and goals by club, season and competition
Club	Season	League			National cup		Continental		Total	
Club	Season	Division	Apps	Goals	Apps	Goals	Apps	Goals	Apps	Goals
Sturm Graz II	2019–20	Austrian Regionalliga Central	12	2	—		—		12	2
Sturm Graz II	2020–21	Austrian Regionalliga Central	7	2	—		—		7	2
Sturm Graz II	2021–22	Austrian Regionalliga Central	3	0	—		—		3	0
Sturm Graz II	Total		22	4	—		—		22	4
Sturm Graz	2019–20	Austrian Bundesliga	2	0	0	0	0	0	2	0
Sturm Graz	2020–21	Austrian Bundesliga	15	0	2	0	—		17	0
Sturm Graz	2021–22	Austrian Bundesliga	0	0	1	0	0	0	1	0
Sturm Graz	Total		17	0	3	0	0	0	20	0
Kapfenberger SV (loan)	2021–22	Austrian Second League	23	6	1	0	—		24	6
Mura (loan)	2022–23	Slovenian PrvaLiga	25	1	1	0	4 (Note: Appearances in UEFA Europa Conference League)	0	30	1
Mura	2023–24	Slovenian PrvaLiga	19	7	1	0	—		20	7
Mura	Total		67	14	3	0	4	0	74	14
Rubin Kazan	2023–24	Russian Premier League	10	0	—		—		10	0
Rubin Kazan	2024–25	Russian Premier League	23	5	8	2	—		31	7
Rubin Kazan	2025–26	Russian Premier League	22	2	5	1	—		27	3
Rubin Kazan	2026–27	Russian Premier League	2	0	1	0	—		3	0
Rubin Kazan	Total		57	7	14	3	—		71	10
Career total			163	25	20	3	4	0	187	28
