= Marvin Çuni =

Albanian footballer (born 2001)

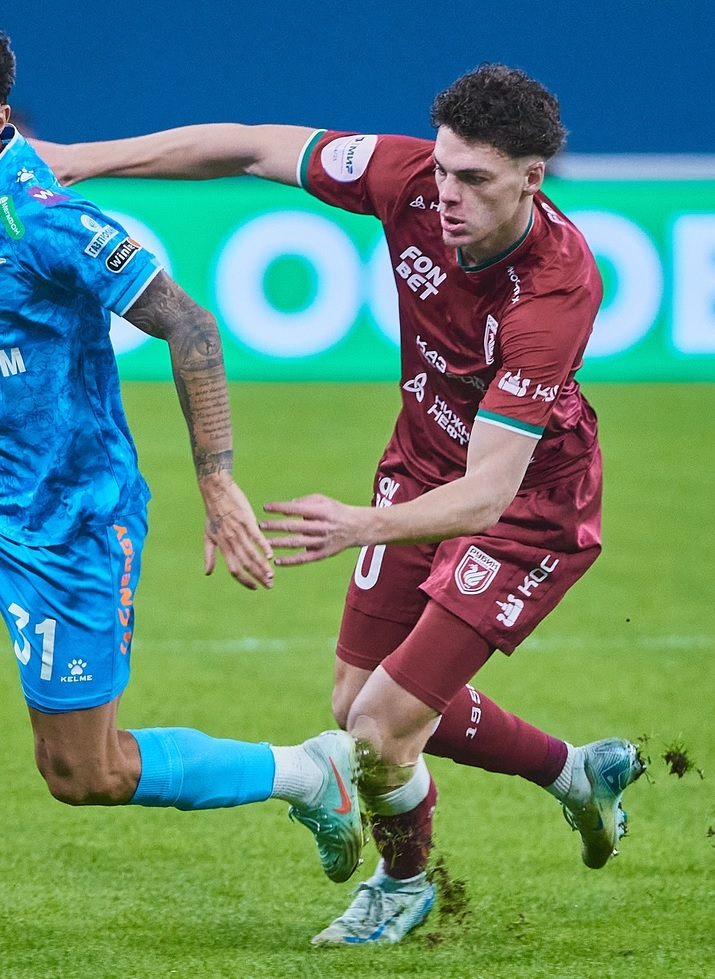
- Çuni with Rubin in 2025

Personal information
- Date of birth: 10 July 2001 (age 25)
- Place of birth: Freising, Germany
- Height: 1.88 m (6 ft 2 in)
- Position: Forward

Team information
- Current team: Olimpija Ljubljana (on loan from Rubin Kazan)
- Number: 17

Youth career
- –2012: Eintracht Freising
- 2012–2020: Bayern Munich

Senior career*
Years	Team	Apps	(Gls)
2020–2023	Bayern Munich II	0	(0)
2020–2021	→ Sonnenhof Großaspach (loan)	34	(19)
2021–2022	→ SC Paderborn (loan)	11	(0)
2021–2022	→ SC Paderborn II (loan)	3	(3)
2022–2023	→ 1. FC Saarbrücken (loan)	32	(9)
2023–2024	Frosinone	25	(2)
2024–	Rubin Kazan	10	(0)
2025–2026	→ Sampdoria (loan)	15	(1)
2026	→ Bari (loan)	15	(1)
2026–	→ Olimpija Ljubljana (loan)	0	(0)

International career^{‡}
2019	Albania U19	6	(2)
2023–	Albania	1	(0)
- * Club domestic league appearances and goals as of 12 May 2026 ‡ National team caps and goals as of 07:15, 4 December 2023 (UTC)

Marvin Çuni (born 10 July 2001) is a professional footballer who plays as a forward for Slovenian PrvaLiga club Olimpija Ljubljana, on loan from Russian Premier League club Rubin Kazan. Born in Germany, he plays for the Albania national team.

== Club career ==
=== Bayern Munich ===
After playing youth football for Eintracht Freising, Çuni joined Bayern Munich in 2012 and progressed through all the youth teams.

==== Loan to Sonnenhof Großaspach ====
In the summer of 2020, he joined Regionalliga Südwest club Sonnenhof Großaspach on a season-long loan. He made 34 appearances for the club, scoring 19 goals.

==== Loan to SC Paderborn ====
On 1 September 2021, Çuni extended his contract with Bayern until June 2024, and moved to 2. Bundesliga club SC Paderborn on loan until the end of the season.

==== Loan to 1. FC Saarbrücken ====
On 24 June 2022, Çuni joined 3. Liga club 1. FC Saarbrücken on loan for the rest of the season. He scored 13 goals in 35 appearances for the club.

=== Frosinone ===
On 6 July 2023, Çuni joined newly promoted Serie A side Frosinone on a permanent deal, signing a three-year contract with the club.

=== Rubin Kazan ===
On 11 September 2024, Çuni signed a four-year contract with Russian Premier League club Rubin Kazan.

==== Loan to Sampdoria ====
On 1 August 2025, Çuni returned to Italy and signed with Serie B club Sampdoria on loan for the 2025–26 season, with an option to buy. He also signed a contract with Sampdoria until June 2029 that would have been in place if the option was exercised.

==== Loan to Bari ====
On 26 January 2026, Çuni moved on a new loan to Bari, also in Serie B, with an option to buy.

==== Loan to Olimpija Ljubljana ====
On 19 June 2026, he was loaned to Olimpija Ljubljana in Slovenia for the 2026–27 season.

== International career ==
Çuni has played for the Albanian under-19 team. On 14 October 2023, he received a call-up from the Albania national team for a friendly match against Bulgaria.

== Personal life ==
Çuni was born in Germany into an Albanian family from Peja.

== Career statistics ==
As of match played 30 March 2025

Appearances and goals by club, season and competition
Club	Season	League			Cup		Total	
Club	Season	Division	Apps	Goals	Apps	Goals	Apps	Goals
Bayern Munich II	2020–21	3. Liga	0	0	–		0	0
SG Sonnenhof Großaspach (loan)	2020–21	Regionalliga Südwest	34	19	2	3	36	22
SC Paderborn (loan)	2021–22	2. Bundesliga	11	0	0	0	11	0
SC Paderborn II (loan)	2021–22	Oberliga Westfalen	3	3	0	0	3	3
1. FC Saarbrücken (loan)	2022–23	3. Liga	32	9	3	4	35	13
Frosinone	2023–24	Serie A	25	2	1	0	26	2
Rubin Kazan	2024–25	Russian Premier League	10	0	4	0	14	0
Career total			115	33	10	7	125	40
