= Ruslan Bezrukov =

Russian footballer

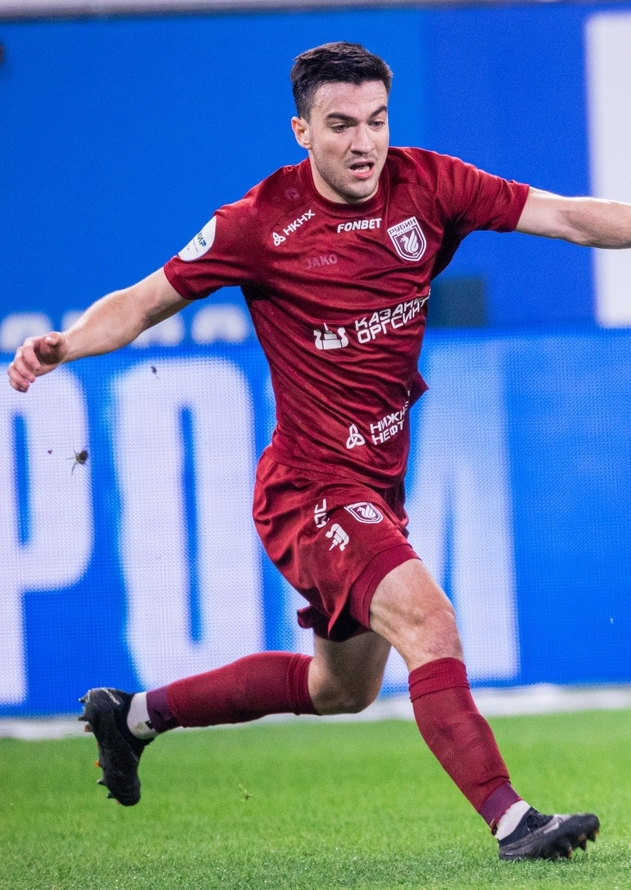
- Bezrukov with Rubin Kazan in 2024

Personal information
- Full name: Ruslan Kemilevich Bezrukov
- Date of birth: 21 March 2002 (age 24)
- Place of birth: Rostov-on-Don, Russia
- Height: 1.79 m (5 ft 10 in)
- Position: Midfielder

Team information
- Current team: Rubin Kazan
- Number: 23

Youth career
- 2009–2010: Yunost Rossii Rostov-on-Don
- 2010–2012: Zvezda Rostov-on-Don
- 2013–2021: Rostov

Senior career*
Years	Team	Apps	(Gls)
2021–2022	SKA Rostov-on-Don	26	(4)
2022	Neftekhimik Nizhnekamsk	7	(0)
2022–	Rubin Kazan	96	(8)
2023	→ Rubin-2 Kazan	1	(0)
- * Club domestic league appearances and goals as of 24 October 2026

Ruslan Kemilevich Bezrukov (Russian: Руслан Кэмилевич Безруков; born 21 March 2002) is a Russian football player who plays as a midfielder for Rubin Kazan. He plays as left, right or central midfielder.

== Career ==
Bezrukov started his senior career with Rostov and made one appearance for the main squad at the 2020 Match Premier Cup.

On 30 August 2022, Bezrukov signed a four-year contract with Rubin Kazan in the Russian First League. He contributed to Rubin returning to the Russian Premier League after one year in the second tier. He started most of the games under the management of Leonid Slutsky and Yuri Utkulbayev, but after Rashid Rakhimov was hired as Rubin manager in April 2023, Bezrukov mostly remained on the bench in league games, playing as a starter in the 2023–24 Russian Cup matchups.

He made his RPL debut for Rubin on 25 September 2023 in a game against Fakel Voronezh. Bezrukov re-established himself as a starter after, scoring his first RPL goal on 12 November 2023 against Sochi.

On 15 July 2025, his contract with Rubin was extended to 2029.

== Career statistics ==
As of match played 28 October 2026

Club	Season	League			Cup		Europe		Total	
Club	Season	Division	Apps	Goals	Apps	Goals	Apps	Goals	Apps	Goals
Rostov	2020–21	Russian Premier League	0	0	0	0	0	0	0	0
SKA Rostov-on-Don	2021–22	Russian Second League	26	4	—		—		26	4
Neftekhimik Nizhnekamsk	2022–23	Russian First League	7	0	—		—		7	0
Rubin Kazan	2022–23	Russian First League	17	1	0	0	—		17	1
Rubin Kazan	2023–24	Russian Premier League	19	2	5	0	—		24	2
Rubin Kazan	2024–25	Russian Premier League	24	3	9	0	—		33	3
Rubin Kazan	2025–26	Russian Premier League	25	2	6	1	—		31	3
Rubin Kazan	2026–27	Russian Premier League	11	0	5	0	—		16	0
Rubin Kazan	Total		96	8	25	1	0	0	121	9
Rubin-2 Kazan	2023	Russian Second League B	1	0	—		—		1	0
Career total			129	12	25	1	0	0	154	13
