= 2024–25 FC Rubin Kazan season =

Rubin Kazan
2024–25 season
- Chairman: Ilsur Metshin
- Head coach: Rashid Rakhimov
- Stadium: Ak Bars Arena
- Premier League: 7th
- Russian Cup: Regions path Quarter-finals Stage 2
- Top goalscorer: League: Mirlind Daku (15); All: Mirlind Daku (15)
- Highest home attendance: 17,449 vs Spartak Moscow (9 March 2025)
- Lowest home attendance: 2,447 vs Dynamo Moscow (20 October 2024)
- Average home league attendance: 9,530 (24 May 2025)
Home colours	Away colours	Third colours

The 2024–25 FC Rubin Kazan season was the 67th season in the history of FC Rubin Kazan, and the club's second consecutive season in Russian Premier League. In addition to the domestic league, they participated in the Russian Cup.

== Squad ==
As of match played 24 May 2025

No.	Name	Nationality	Position	Date of birth (age)	Signed from	Signed in	Contract ends	Apps.	Goals
Goalkeepers
25	Artur Nigmatullin	(Russia)	GK	17 May 1991 (aged 34)	Pari NN	2024		7	0
38	Yevgeni Staver	(Russia)	GK	16 February 1998 (aged 27)	Yenisey Krasnoyarsk	2024		32	0
86	Nikita Korets	(Russia)	GK	25 March 2005 (aged 20)	Academy	2024		0	0
Defenders
2	Yegor Teslenko	(Russia)	DF	31 January 2001 (aged 24)	KAMAZ	2022		81	7
5	Rustam Ashurmatov	(Uzbekistan)	DF	7 July 1996 (aged 28)	Navbahor	2023		45	3
15	Igor Vujačić	(Montenegro)	DF	8 August 1994 (aged 30)	Partizan	2023		67	0
27	Aleksei Gritsayenko	(Russia)	DF	25 May 1995 (aged 29)	Tambov	2021		91	2
51	Ilya Rozhkov	(Russia)	DF	29 March 2005 (aged 20)	Academy	2022		52	4
70	Dmitri Kabutov	(Russia)	DF	26 March 1992 (aged 33)	Ufa	2022		92	7
71	Konstantin Nizhegorodov	(Russia)	DF	21 June 2002 (aged 22)	Hansa Rostock	2021		24	1
Midfielders
6	Ugochukwu Iwu	(Armenia)	MF	28 November 1999 (aged 25)	Urartu	2023		61	2
7	Aleksandar Jukić	(Austria)	MF	26 July 2000 (aged 24)	Sochi	2024		6	2
8	Bogdan Jočić	(Serbia)	MF	11 January 2001 (aged 24)	Voždovac	2024		26	3
18	Marat Apshatsev	(Russia)	MF	27 May 2001 (aged 23)	Tom Tomsk	2021		57	3
19	Oleg Ivanov	(Russia)	MF	4 August 1986 (aged 38)	Ufa	2022		70	2
21	Aleksandr Zotov	(Russia)	MF	27 August 1990 (aged 34)	Yenisey Krasnoyarsk	2022		88	4
22	Veldin Hodža	(Croatia)	MF	15 October 2002 (aged 22)	Rijeka	2024		26	2
23	Ruslan Bezrukov	(Russia)	MF	21 March 2002 (aged 23)	Neftekhimik Nizhnekamsk	2022		74	4
24	Nikola Čumić	(Serbia)	MF	20 November 1998 (aged 26)	Vojvodina	2023		43	3
30	Valentín Vada	(Argentina)	MF	6 March 1996 (aged 29)	Real Zaragoza	2023		52	6
96	Nikita Vasilyev	(Russia)	MF	14 December 2006 (aged 18)	Academy	2024		6	0
Forwards
10	Mirlind Daku	(Albania)	FW	1 January 1998 (aged 27)	Osijek	2023		62	25
11	Kasra Taheri	(Iran)	FW	6 August 2006 (aged 18)	Sepahan	2024		6	0
56	Lenar Fattakhov	(Russia)	FW	12 May 2003 (aged 22)	Academy	2022		0	0
87	Enri Mukba	(Russia)	FW	22 September 2005 (aged 19)	Ritsa	2023		1	0
90	Marvin Çuni	(Albania)	FW	10 July 2001 (aged 23)	Frosinone	2024		14	0
99	Dardan Shabanhaxhaj	(Austria)	FW	23 April 2001 (aged 24)	Mura	2024		41	7
Away on loan
9	Aleksandr Lomovitsky	(Russia)	MF	27 January 1998 (aged 27)	Spartak Moscow	2022		41	1
33	Umarali Rakhmonaliev	(Uzbekistan)	MF	18 August 2003 (aged 21)	Bunyodkor	2023		27	0
77	Daniil Kuznetsov	(Russia)	FW	23 April 2003 (aged 22)	Zenit St.Petersburg	2022		24	0
Players that left Rubin Kazan during the season
20	Joel Fameyeh	(Ghana)	FW	14 May 1997 (aged 28)	Orenburg	2022		56	15

== Transfers ==
=== In ===
Date	Position	Nationality	Name	From	Fee	Ref.
15 June 2024	GK	(Russia)	Artur Nigmatullin	Pari NN	Undisclosed	
25 June 2024	GK	(Russia)	Yevgeni Staver	Yenisey Krasnoyarsk	Undisclosed	
29 June 2024	MF	(Austria)	Aleksandar Jukić	Sochi	Undisclosed	
11 September 2024	FW	(Albania)	Marvin Çuni	Frosinone	Undisclosed	
12 September 2024	MF	(Croatia)	Veldin Hodža	Rijeka	Undisclosed	

=== Out ===
Date	Position	Nationality	Name	To	Fee	Ref.
15 June 2024	GK	(Russia)	Yury Dyupin	Krasnodar	Undisclosed	
2 July 2024	FW	(Russia)	Soltmurad Bakayev	Akron Tolyatti	Undisclosed	
3 July 2024	MF	(Russia)	Leon Musayev	Rodina Moscow	Undisclosed	
4 July 2024	MF	(Russia)	Mikhail Kostyukov	SKA-Khabarovsk	Undisclosed	
12 September 2024	FW	(Belarus)	Vitaly Lisakovich	Baltika Kaliningrad	Undisclosed	
1 February 2025	FW	(Ghana)	Joel Fameyeh	Puskás Akadémia	Undisclosed	
4 February 2025	GK	(Russia)	Artyom Ismagilov	Kaluga	Undisclosed	

=== Loans out ===
Date from	Position	Nationality	Name	To	Date to	Ref.
21 June 2024	MF	(Russia)	Daniil Rodin	Neftekhimik Nizhnekamsk	End of season	
26 June 2024	GK	(Russia)	Nikita Yanovich	Neftekhimik Nizhnekamsk	End of season	
5 July 2024	DF	(Serbia)	Uroš Drezgić	Diósgyőr	End of season	
27 December 2024	FW	(Russia)	Daniil Kuznetsov	Ural Yekaterinburg	End of season	
23 January 2025	FW	(Russia)	Daniil Motorin	KAMAZ Naberezhnye Chelny	End of season	
27 January 2025	FW	(Russia)	Aleksandr Lomovitsky	Fakel Voronezh	End of season	
28 January 2025	MF	(Uzbekistan)	Umarali Rakhmonaliev	Sabah	End of season	

=== Released ===
Date	Position	Nationality	Name	Joined	Date	Ref.
31 May 2024	MF	(Switzerland)	Darko Jevtić	Jedinstvo Ub		
16 June 2024	DF	(Belarus)	Alyaksandr Martynovich	Kairat	18 June 2024	
20 June 2024	GK	(Russia)	Yegor Shamov	Yenisey Krasnoyarsk	4 July 2024	
1 July 2024	DF	(Poland)	Maciej Rybus			

== Friendlies ==
27 June 2024	Rubin Kazan	2–1	KAMAZ	Kazan
18:00 MSK (UTC+3)	Apshatsev 46'; Motorin 59'	Report	Yermolayev 24'	Stadium: Ak Bars Arena

4 July 2024	Rubin Kazan	2–2	Krylia Sovetov	Kazan
11:00 MSK (UTC+3)	Čumić 30'; Vada 59'	Report	Shitov (yellow card) 32'; Orozco (yellow card) 41'; Teslenko 47' (o.g.); Pisarsky 89'	Stadium: Central Stadium

7 July 2024	Rubin Kazan	3–1	Yenisey Krasnoyarsk	Kazan
18:30 MSK (UTC+3)	Jukić 36' (pen.), 57'; Teslenko (yellow card) 39'; Bezrukov 80'		Molteninov 90+2'	Stadium: Central Stadium

13 July 2024	Lokomotiv Moscow	3–4	Rubin Kazan	Moscow
17:30 MSK (UTC+3)		Report		Stadium: RZD Arena

== Competitions ==
=== Overall record ===
Competition	First match	Last match	Starting round	Final position	Record							
Competition	First match	Last match	Starting round	Final position	Pld	W	D	L	GF	GA	GD	Win %
Premier League	22 July 2024	24 May 2025	Matchday 1	7th	30	13	6	11	42	45	−3	43.33
Russian Cup	30 July 2024	12 March 2025	Group stage	Regions path Quarter-finals Stage 2	9	3	1	5	7	8	−1	33.33
Total					39	16	7	16	49	53	−4	41.03

Last updated: 24 May 2025
Source: Soccerway

=== Premier League ===
==== League table ====
Pos	Team	Pld	W	D	L	GF	GA	GD	Pts
5	Dynamo Moscow	30	16	8	6	61	35	+26	56
6	Lokomotiv Moscow	30	15	8	7	51	41	+10	53
7	Rubin Kazan	30	13	6	11	42	45	−3	45
8	Rostov	30	10	9	11	41	43	−2	39
9	Akron Tolyatti	30	10	5	15	39	55	−16	35

Source: Premier Liga
Rules for classification: 1) Points; 2) Head-to-head points; 3) Head-to-head matches won; 4) Head-to-head goal difference; 5) Head-to-head goals scored; 6) Matches won; 7) Goal difference; 8) Goals scored; 9) 2023–24 position (not applicable to final standings); 10) Play-off. Note: if teams tied on points did not play an equal number of head-to-head games, head-to-head results are not considered for the standings.

==== Results summary ====
Overall								Home						Away					
Pld	W	D	L	GF	GA	GD	Pts	W	D	L	GF	GA	GD	W	D	L	GF	GA	GD
30	13	6	11	42	45	−3	45	9	2	4	22	19	+3	4	4	7	20	26	−6

Last updated: 24 May 2025.

==== Results by round ====
Round	1	2	3	4	5	6	7	8	9	10	11	12	13	14	15	16	17	18	19	20	21	22	23	24	25	26	27	28	29	30
Ground	A	H	H	A	A	H	A	H	H	A	H	H	A	A	H	H	A	A	A	H	H	A	A	H	A	H	A	H	A	H
Result	W	L	L	D	W	W	L	L	D	D	W	L	W	L	D	W	D	W	L	W	W	L	D	W	L	W	L	W	L	W
Position	2	9	10	12	8	7	8	8	8	7	7	7	7	7	7	7	8	8	8	8	7	8	8	7	8	7	7	7	7	7

Updated to match(es) played on 24 May 2025. Source:
A = Away; H = Home; W = Win; D = Draw; L = Loss
Notes:
- ^{1}

==== Matches ====
22 July 2024 1	Pari NN	2–4	Rubin Kazan	Nizhny Novgorod
20:00 MSK (UTC+3)	Zé Turbo 3'; Stamatov (yellow card) 14'; Aleksandrov (yellow card) 20'; Kakkoyev (yellow card) 64'; Tsarukyan 71'; Boselli (yellow card) 89'	Report	Daku 4'; Teslenko (yellow card) 30'; Zotov 33' (yellow card) 54'; Vada 42'; Kabutov 90+'	Stadium: Nizhny Novgorod Stadium; Attendance: 7,962; Referee: Rafael Shafeev

27 July 2024 2	Rubin Kazan	0–4	Zenit St.Petersburg	Kazan
17:30 MSK (UTC+3)	Teslenko (yellow card) 48'; Daku (yellow card) 89'	Report	Glushenkov 36'; Cassierra 44' (pen.); Pedro 55'; Isidor 90+2'	Stadium: Ak Bars Arena; Attendance: 14,575; Referee: Artem Chistyakov

3 August 2024 3	Rubin Kazan	2–3	Khimki	Kazan
20:00 MSK (UTC+3)	Daku 45+' (pen.); Jukić 65'	Report	Mirzov (yellow card) 25'; Anđelković (yellow card) 33'; Khosonov 50'; Fariña 67' (yellow card) 70'; Vera 85' (pen.); Golubović (yellow card) 90+'	Stadium: Ak Bars Arena; Attendance: 5,738; Referee: Pavel Kukuyan

9 August 2024 4	Rostov	0–0	Rubin Kazan	Rostov
20:45 MSK (UTC+3)	Glebov 14'; Golenkov (yellow card) 29'; Langovich (yellow card) 52'	Report	Daku 62' (pen.); Iwu (yellow card) 78'; Jukić (yellow card) 85'	Stadium: Rostov Arena; Attendance: 13,000; Referee: Aleksey Sukhoi

19 August 2024 5	Akron Tolyatti	1–2	Rubin Kazan	Samara
17:30 MSK (UTC+3)	Paliyenko 9'	Report	Savichev 55' (o.g.); Vujačić (yellow card) 67'; Daku 90' (yellow card) 90'	Stadium: Solidarnost Samara Arena; Attendance: 3,567; Referee: Egor Egorov

23 August 2024 6	Rubin Kazan	2–0	Dynamo Makhachkala	Kazan
20:00 MSK (UTC+3)	Daku 45'; Čumić 63'; Teslenko (yellow card) 79'; Staver (yellow card) 87'; Ivanov (yellow card) 90+3'	Report	Yusupov (yellow card) 45+1'; Alibekov (red card) 68'; Zinovich (yellow card) 90+2'; Gadzhiyev (yellow card) 90+3'	Stadium: Ak Bars Arena; Attendance: 7,555; Referee: Kirill Levnikov

31 August 2024 7	Spartak Moscow	1–0	Rubin Kazan	Moscow
19:45 MSK (UTC+3)	Denisov (yellow card) 29'; Zobnin (yellow card) 45+' (yellow-red card) 62'; Barco 74' (pen.); Reabciuk (yellow card) 90+'	Report	Vujačić (yellow card) 26'; Rozhkov (yellow card) 39'; Daku (yellow card) 90+'	Stadium: Lukoil Arena; Attendance: 16,694; Referee: Sergei Karasev

13 September 2024 8	Rubin Kazan	0–2	Krylia Sovetov	Kazan
20:15 MSK (UTC+3)	Ashurmatov (yellow card) 35'	Report	Garré 37' (pen.); Oleynikov 42'; Pyachenin (yellow card) 52'; Fernando (yellow card) 67'; Dmitriyev (yellow card) 90+'	Stadium: Ak Bars Arena; Attendance: 8,188; Referee: Vladislav Bezborodov

21 September 2024 9	Rubin Kazan	1–1	CSKA Moscow	Kazan
19:00 MSK (UTC+3)	Gritsayenko (yellow card) 24'; Teslenko 55'	Report	Zhemaletdinov 15'; Diveyev (yellow card) 61'	Stadium: Ak Bars Arena; Attendance: 13,820; Referee: Kirill Levnikov

27 September 2024 10	Fakel Voronezh	0–0	Rubin Kazan	Voronezh
19:00 MSK (UTC+3)	Kvekveskiri (yellow card) 57'; Kalinin (yellow card) 58'	Report	Iwu (yellow card) 30'; Vujačić (yellow card) 33'	Stadium: Fakel Stadium; Attendance: 8,134; Referee: Vitali Meshkov

5 October 2024 11	Rubin Kazan	2–0	Akhmat Grozny	Kazan
19:00 MSK (UTC+3)	Rozhkov 45'; Daku (yellow card) 79' (goal) 90+'; Teslenko (yellow card) 90+'; Zotov (yellow card) 90+'	Report	Kovachev (yellow card) 22'; Ismael (yellow card) 51'; Diale (yellow card) 90+'; Todorović (penalty missed) 90+'	Stadium: Ak Bars Arena; Attendance: 5,871; Referee: Ivan Abrosimov

20 October 2024 12	Rubin Kazan	0–4	Dynamo Moscow	Kazan
19:00 MSK (UTC+3)	Zotov (yellow card) 39'; Čumić (yellow card) 42'; Kabutov (yellow card) 77'; Rozhkov (yellow card) 80'; Ivanov (yellow card) 85'	Report	Tyukavin 4' (pen.); Bitello (yellow card) 35'; Arthur 38' (pen.) (yellow card) 75'; Balbuena 62'; Gladyshev 88'	Stadium: Ak Bars Arena; Attendance: 2,447; Referee: Aleksey Sukhoi

27 October 2024 13	Orenburg	1–2	Rubin Kazan	Orenburg
12:00 MSK (UTC+3)	Saharkhizan 27'; Mansilla (yellow card) 75'; Bašić (yellow card) 90+'	Report	Kabutov (yellow card) 33'; Hodža 48', 87' (yellow card) 88'; Teslenko (yellow card) 64'	Stadium: Gazovik Stadium; Attendance: 3,686; Referee: Pavel Kukuyan

2 November 2024 14	Lokomotiv Moscow	1–0	Rubin Kazan	Moscow
18:00 MSK (UTC+3)	Suleymanov (yellow card) 80'; Timofeyev (yellow card) 85' (goal) 89'	Report	Ivanov (yellow card) 90+'	Stadium: RZD Arena; Attendance: 6,544; Referee: Sergey Ivanov

10 November 2024 15	Rubin Kazan	1–1	Krasnodar	Kazan
19:45 MSK (UTC+3)	Čumić 18'; Daku (penalty missed) 31'; Nizhegorodov (yellow card) 35'; Rozhkov (yellow card) 45+'; Vujačić (yellow card) 75'	Report	Tormena (yellow card) 30'; Chernikov (yellow card) 50' (goal) 53'; Spertsyan (yellow card) 90'	Stadium: Ak Bars Arena; Attendance: 7,923; Referee: Sergei Karasev

22 November 2024 16	Rubin Kazan	3–0	Akron Tolyatti	Kazan
18:00 MSK (UTC+3)	Kabutov (yellow card) 5'; Daku 10', 20'; Bezrukov (yellow card) 63'; Fameyeh 88' (pen.)	Report		Stadium: Ak Bars Arena; Attendance: 6,496; Referee: Yan Bobrovsky

30 November 2024 17	CSKA Moscow	2–2	Rubin Kazan	Moscow
16:30 MSK (UTC+3)	Lukin 63', 90+' (yellow card) 73'	Report	Jočić (yellow card) 22'; Iwu (yellow card) 35'; Kabutov (yellow card) 41' (yellow-red card) 65'; Daku 43'; Teslenko 52'; Bezrukov (yellow card) 88'	Stadium: VTB Arena; Attendance: 6,038; Referee: Vasily Kazartsev

7 December 2024 18	Dynamo Makhachkala	2–3	Rubin Kazan	Kaspiysk
19:00 MSK (UTC+3)	Đapo 17' (yellow card) 62'; Mrezigue 39'; Serderov (yellow card) 45+'	Report	Jočić 43'; Teslenko 56'; Shabanhaxhaj 69'; Vujačić (yellow card) 75'; Bezrukov (yellow card) 86'; Çuni (yellow card) 90+'; Staver (yellow card) 90+'	Stadium: Anzhi Arena; Attendance: 4,130; Referee: Aleksey Sukhoi

1 March 2025 19	Akhmat Grozny	2–1	Rubin Kazan	Grozny
19:00 MSK (UTC+3)	Ghandri 41' (pen.), 63'; Sadulayev (yellow card) 74'; Utkin (yellow card) 90+'	Report	Shabanhaxhaj 10'; Čumić (yellow card) 23'; Vujačić (yellow card) 33'; Teslenko (yellow card) 38'; Ashurmatov (yellow card) 49'; Hodža (yellow card) 90+'	Stadium: Akhmat-Arena; Attendance: 3,537; Referee: Artem Chistyakov

9 March 2025 20	Rubin Kazan	2–1	Spartak Moscow	Kazan
19:30 MSK (UTC+3)	Kabutov (yellow card) 5'; Daku 8', 28' (yellow card) 28' (yellow-red card) 75'; Iwu (yellow card) 59'	Report	Barco 42' (pen.); Duarte (yellow card) 63' (yellow-red card) 75'; Marquinhos (yellow card) 68'; Solari (yellow card) 87'	Stadium: Ak Bars Arena; Attendance: 17,449; Referee: Kirill Levnikov

16 March 2025 21	Rubin Kazan	1–0	Pari NN	Kazan
15:15 MSK (UTC+3)	Vujačić (yellow card) 45+'; Zotov 72'	Report	Vecino (yellow card) 84'	Stadium: Ak Bars Arena; Attendance: 8,320; Referee: Sergey Tsyganok

30 March 2025 22	Zenit St.Petersburg	4–0	Rubin Kazan	Saint Petersburg
19:30 MSK (UTC+3)	Mantuan (yellow card) 34' (goal) 59'; Gondou 51'; Cassierra 73'; Mostovoy 74'	Report	Gritsayenko (yellow card) 45' (yellow-red card) 54'; Zotov (yellow card) 88'	Stadium: Krestovsky Stadium; Attendance: 33,806; Referee: Pavel Kukuyan

5 April 2025 23	Krylia Sovetov	1–1	Rubin Kazan	Samara
13:00 MSK (UTC+3)	Sergeyev 16'; Bijl (yellow card) 57'	Report	Hodža (yellow card) 54'; Teslenko (yellow card) 65' (yellow-red card) 84'; Vada 88' (pen.)	Stadium: Solidarnost Samara Arena; Attendance: 12,072; Referee: Kirill Levnikov

12 April 2025 24	Rubin Kazan	1–0	Lokomotiv Moscow	Kazan
17:00 MSK (UTC+3)	Shabanhaxhaj 50'; Rozhkov (yellow card) 87'	Report	Godyayev (yellow card) 44'; Barinov (yellow card) 64'; Suleymanov (yellow card) 90+'	Stadium: Ak Bars Arena; Attendance: 15,005; Referee: Vladimir Moskalyov

20 April 2025 25	Dynamo Moscow	3–1	Rubin Kazan	Moscow
14:00 MSK (UTC+3)	Gladyshev 23', 61'; Bitello 90+'	Report	Teslenko (yellow card) 4'; Daku (yellow card) 10' (yellow-red card) 90+'; Iwu (yellow card) 33'; Vada (yellow card) 80'	Stadium: VTB Arena; Attendance: 12,494; Referee: Sergey Cheban

27 April 2025 26	Rubin Kazan	2–1	Fakel Voronezh	Kazan
19:00 MSK (UTC+3)		Report	Ilyin 22'; Kalinin (yellow card) 41'; Moțpan (red card) 45+'; Kvekveskiri (yellow card) 90+'	Stadium: Ak Bars Arena; Attendance: 8,190; Referee: Roman Safyan

3 May 2025 27	Krasnodar	2–1	Rubin Kazan	Krasnodar
19:30 MSK (UTC+3)	Spertsyan 5' (pen.); Chernikov (yellow card) 6'; Tormena (yellow card) 14' (goal) 40'; Pina (yellow card) 90+'; Córdoba (yellow card) 90+'	Report	Daku (yellow card) 7'; Rozhkov 83'	Stadium: Krasnodar Stadium; Attendance: 34,037; Referee: Kirill Levnikov

11 May 2025 28	Rubin Kazan	1–0	Rostov	Kazan
19:30 MSK (UTC+3)	Hodža (yellow card) 67'; Daku 90' (yellow card) 90+'	Report	Sako (yellow card) 35'; Shantaly (yellow card) 60'; Shamonin (yellow card) 86'	Stadium: Ak Bars Arena; Attendance: 10,634; Referee: Egor Egorov

17 May 2025 29	Khimki	3–2	Rubin Kazan	Khimki
16:30 MSK (UTC+3)	Zabolotny 9'; Fariña (yellow card) 62' (red card) 76'; Rudenko 67', 90+'; Filin (yellow card) 81'	Report	Daku 12', 58' (penalty missed) 43'	Stadium: Arena Khimki; Attendance: 1,818; Referee: Rafael Shafeev

24 May 2025 30	Rubin Kazan	4–2	Orenburg	Kazan
16:30 MSK (UTC+3)	Shabanhaxhaj 5', 25' (yellow card) 56'; Daku 7'; Hodža (yellow card) 62'; Jočić 88'	Report	Marín 11'; Mikhaylov (yellow card) 18'; Mansilla 22'; Prokhin (yellow card) 56'; Karataş (yellow card) 75'; Kasimov (yellow card) 87'; Saharkhizan (yellow card) 90'	Stadium: Ak Bars Arena; Attendance: 10,743; Referee: Evgeniy Kukulyak

=== Russian Cup ===
==== Group stage ====
Pos	Team	Pld	W	PW	PL	L	GF	GA	GD	Pts	Qualification
1	Zenit Saint Petersburg	6	5	0	1	0	13	2	+11	16	Qualification to the Knockout phase (RPL path)
2	Rubin Kazan	6	3	0	0	3	7	4	+3	9	Qualification to the Knockout phase (RPL path)
3	Akron Tolyatti	6	2	1	0	3	6	12	−6	8	Qualification to the Knockout phase (regions path)
4	Fakel Voronezh	6	1	0	0	5	2	10	−8	3	

Source: Russian Football Union (in Russian), Soccerway
Rules for classification: 1) Points; 2) Head-to-head points; 3) Head-to-head matches won; 4) Head-to-head goal difference; 5) Head-to-head goals scored; 6) Matches won; 7) Goal difference; 8) Goals scored; 9) Penalty shoot-out goal difference; 10) Draw.

30 July 2024 1	Rubin Kazan	4–0	Akron Tolyatti	Kazan
18:30 MSK (UTC+3)	Kuznetsov 8'; Ivanov (yellow card) 10'; Rozhkov 48'; Jukić 74'; Iwu 81'	Report	Baranok (yellow card) 26'; Moskvichyov (yellow card) 47'	Stadium: Ak Bars Arena; Attendance: 7,140; Referee: Roman Safyan

14 August 2024 2	Rubin Kazan	0–1	Zenit St.Petersburg	Kazan
17:15 MSK (UTC+3)	Ashurmatov (yellow card) 33'; Rakhmonaliyev (yellow card) 83'; Vujačić (yellow card) 90+3'; Zotov (yellow card) 90+7'; Ivanov (yellow card) 90+7'	Report	Vasiljev 59'	Stadium: Ak Bars Arena; Attendance: 14,112; Referee: Mikhail Cheremnykh

27 August 2024 3	Fakel Voronezh	0–2	Rubin Kazan	Voronezh
19:30 MSK (UTC+3)	Bryzgalov (yellow card) 47'; Moțpan (yellow card) 59'	Report	Kuznetsov 41'; Shabanhaxhaj 84'	Stadium: Fakel Stadium; Attendance: 7,090; Referee: Yuri Karpov

17 September 2024 4	Zenit St.Petersburg	2–0	Rubin Kazan	Saint Petersburg
20:00 MSK (UTC+3)	Sobolev (yellow card) 4'; Mantuan 26'; Chistyakov 59'; Artur (yellow card) 89'	Report	Apshatsev (yellow card) 44'	Stadium: Krestovsky Stadium; Attendance: 30,140; Referee: Evgeniy Kukulyak

1 October 2024 5	Rubin Kazan	0–1	Fakel Voronezh	Kazan
16:15 MSK (UTC+3)	Kuznetsov (yellow card) 36'; Čumić (yellow card) 78'	Report	Ilyin 19' (pen.); Bagateliya (yellow card) 30'; Senhadji (yellow card) 58'; Shchetinin (yellow card) 69'; Kvekveskiri (yellow card) 84'	Stadium: Ak Bars Arena; Attendance: 4,309; Referee: Yan Bobrovskiy

23 October 2024 6	Akron Tolyatti	0–1	Rubin Kazan	Samara
20:00 SAMT (UTC+4)	Pestryakov (yellow card) 27'; Khubulov (yellow card) 39'; Savichev (yellow card) 89'	Report	Shabanhaxhaj 8'; Rakhmonaliev (yellow card) 39'	Stadium: Solidarnost Samara Arena; Attendance: 1,050; Referee: Artem Lyubimov

==== Knockout phase ====
6 November 2024 RPL path Quarterfinals 1st leg	Rubin Kazan	0–0	CSKA Moscow	Kazan
18:30 MSK (UTC+3)	Çuni (yellow card) 10' (penalty missed) 89'; Vujačić (yellow card) 35'; Teslenko (yellow card) 53'	Report	Zdjelar (yellow card) 17'; Diveyev (yellow card) 33'; Krugovoy (yellow card) 42'; Khellven (yellow card) 90+1'	Stadium: Ak Bars Arena; Attendance: 14,070; Referee: Artem Chistyakov

26 November 2024 RPL path Quarterfinals 2nd leg	CSKA Moscow	3–0 (3–0 agg.)	Rubin Kazan	Moscow
20:30 MSK (UTC+3)	Khellven 20' (yellow card) 88'; Fayzullaev 30'; Musayev 38'; Willyan (yellow card) 88'	Report	Shabanhaxhaj (yellow card) 59'	Stadium: VEB Arena; Attendance: 11,325; Referee: Sergey Ivanov

12 March 2025 Regions path Quarter-finals Stage 2	Ural Yekaterinburg	1–0	Rubin Kazan	Yekaterinburg
16:00 MSK (UTC+3)	Ar. Mamin (yellow card) 44'; Ayupov 45+2'	Report	Çuni (yellow card) 37'	Stadium: Central Stadium; Attendance: 6,572; Referee: Ivan Abrosimov

== Squad statistics ==
As of match played 24 May 2025

=== Appearances and goals ===
No.	Pos	Nat	Player	Total		Premier League		Russian Cup	
No.	Pos	Nat	Player	Apps	Goals	Apps	Goals	Apps	Goals
2	DF	(Russia) RUS	Yegor Teslenko	33	3	27	3	5+1	0
5	DF	(Uzbekistan) UZB	Rustam Ashurmatov	21	0	7+7	0	7	0
6	MF	(Armenia) ARM	Ugochukwu Iwu	33	1	25+1	0	1+6	1
7	MF	(Austria) AUT	Aleksandar Jukić	6	2	3+1	1	0+2	1
8	MF	(Serbia) SRB	Bogdan Jočić	20	2	11+4	2	5	0
10	FW	(Albania) ALB	Mirlind Daku	29	15	26	15	0+3	0
11	FW	(Iran) IRI	Kasra Taheri	4	0	0+2	0	0+2	0
15	DF	(Montenegro) MNE	Igor Vujačić	35	0	27	0	4+4	0
18	MF	(Russia) RUS	Marat Apshatsev	13	0	1+6	0	6	0
19	MF	(Russia) RUS	Oleg Ivanov	35	0	2+26	0	2+5	0
21	DF	(Russia) RUS	Aleksandr Zotov	27	2	12+10	2	4+1	0
22	MF	(Croatia) CRO	Veldin Hodža	26	2	15+7	2	2+2	0
23	MF	(Russia) RUS	Ruslan Bezrukov	33	3	11+13	3	8+1	0
24	MF	(Serbia) SRB	Nikola Čumić	29	2	13+7	2	4+5	0
25	GK	(Russia) RUS	Artur Nigmatullin	7	0	2	0	5	0
27	DF	(Russia) RUS	Aleksei Gritsayenko	30	0	23+1	0	4+2	0
30	MF	(Argentina) ARG	Valentín Vada	30	2	15+9	2	4+2	0
38	GK	(Russia) RUS	Yevgeni Staver	32	0	28	0	4	0
51	DF	(Russia) RUS	Ilya Rozhkov	31	3	26+1	2	3+1	1
70	DF	(Russia) RUS	Dmitri Kabutov	30	1	28	1	0+2	0
71	DF	(Russia) RUS	Konstantin Nizhegorodov	16	0	2+8	0	6	0
87	FW	(Russia) RUS	Enri Mukba	1	0	1	0	0	0
90	FW	(Albania) ALB	Marvin Çuni	14	0	4+6	0	3+1	0
96	MF	(Russia) RUS	Nikita Vasilyev	6	0	2+1	0	2+1	0
99	FW	(Austria) AUT	Dardan Shabanhaxhaj	31	7	17+6	5	7+1	2
Players away from the club on loan:
9	MF	(Russia) RUS	Aleksandr Lomovitsky	3	0	0	0	2+1	0
33	MF	(Uzbekistan) UZB	Umarali Rakhmonaliev	7	0	1+1	0	5	0
77	FW	(Russia) RUS	Daniil Kuznetsov	6	2	0+1	0	5	2
Players who left Rubin Kazan during the season:
20	FW	(Ghana) GHA	Joel Fameyeh	6	1	1+2	1	1+2	0

=== Goal scorers ===
Place	Position	Nation	Number	Name	Premier League	Russian Cup	Total
1	FW	(Albania)	10	Mirlind Daku	15	0	15
2	FW	(Austria)	99	Dardan Shabanhaxhaj	5	2	7
3	DF	(Russia)	2	Yegor Teslenko	3	0	3
3	MF	(Russia)	23	Ruslan Bezrukov	3	0	3
3	DF	(Russia)	51	Ilya Rozhkov	2	1	3
6	MF	(Croatia)	22	Veldin Hodža	2	0	2
6	MF	(Serbia)	24	Nikola Čumić	2	0	2
6	MF	(Russia)	21	Aleksandr Zotov	2	0	2
6	MF	(Argentina)	30	Valentín Vada	2	0	2
6	MF	(Serbia)	8	Bogdan Jočić	2	0	2
6	MF	(Austria)	7	Aleksandar Jukić	1	1	2
6	FW	(Russia)	77	Daniil Kuznetsov	0	2	2
13	DF	(Russia)	70	Dmitri Kabutov	1	0	1
13	FW	(Ghana)	20	Joel Fameyeh	1	0	1
13	MF	(Armenia)	6	Ugochukwu Iwu	0	1	1
13				Own goal	1	0	1
				TOTALS	42	7	49

=== Clean sheets ===
Place	Position	Nation	Number	Name	Premier League	Russian Cup	Total
1	GK	(Russia)	38	Yevgeni Staver	7	3	10
2	GK	(Russia)	25	Artur Nigmatullin	0	1	1
				TOTALS	7	4	11

=== Disciplinary record ===
Number	Nation	Position	Name	Premier League		Russian Cup		Total	
Number	Nation	Position	Name	Yellow card	Red card	Yellow card	Red card	Yellow card	Red card
2	(Russia)	DF	Yegor Teslenko	9	1	1	0	10	1
5	(Uzbekistan)	DF	Rustam Ashurmatov	2	0	1	0	3	0
6	(Armenia)	MF	Ugochukwu Iwu	5	0	0	0	5	0
7	(Austria)	MF	Aleksandar Jukić	1	0	0	0	1	0
8	(Serbia)	MF	Bogdan Jočić	1	0	0	0	1	0
10	(Albania)	FW	Mirlind Daku	10	2	0	0	10	2
11	(Iran)	FW	Kasra Taheri	1	0	0	0	1	0
15	(Montenegro)	DF	Igor Vujačić	7	0	2	0	9	0
18	(Russia)	MF	Marat Apshatsev	0	0	1	0	1	0
19	(Russia)	MF	Oleg Ivanov	3	0	2	0	5	0
21	(Russia)	MF	Aleksandr Zotov	4	0	1	0	5	0
22	(Croatia)	MF	Veldin Hodža	5	0	0	0	5	0
23	(Russia)	MF	Ruslan Bezrukov	3	0	0	0	3	0
24	(Serbia)	MF	Nikola Čumić	2	0	1	0	3	0
27	(Russia)	DF	Aleksei Gritsayenko	3	1	0	0	3	1
30	(Argentina)	MF	Valentín Vada	1	0	0	0	1	0
38	(Russia)	GK	Yevgeni Staver	2	0	0	0	2	0
51	(Russia)	DF	Ilya Rozhkov	4	0	0	0	4	0
70	(Russia)	DF	Dmitri Kabutov	7	1	0	0	7	1
71	(Russia)	DF	Konstantin Nizhegorodov	1	0	0	0	1	0
90	(Albania)	FW	Marvin Çuni	1	0	2	0	3	0
99	(Austria)	FW	Dardan Shabanhaxhaj	2	0	1	0	3	0
Players away on loan:
33	(Uzbekistan)	MF	Umarali Rakhmonaliev	0	0	2	0	2	0
77	(Russia)	FW	Daniil Kuznetsov	0	0	1	0	1	0
Players who left Rubin Kazan during the season:
			TOTALS	74	5	15	0	89	5
