= Ilya Rozhkov =

Russian footballer (born 2005)

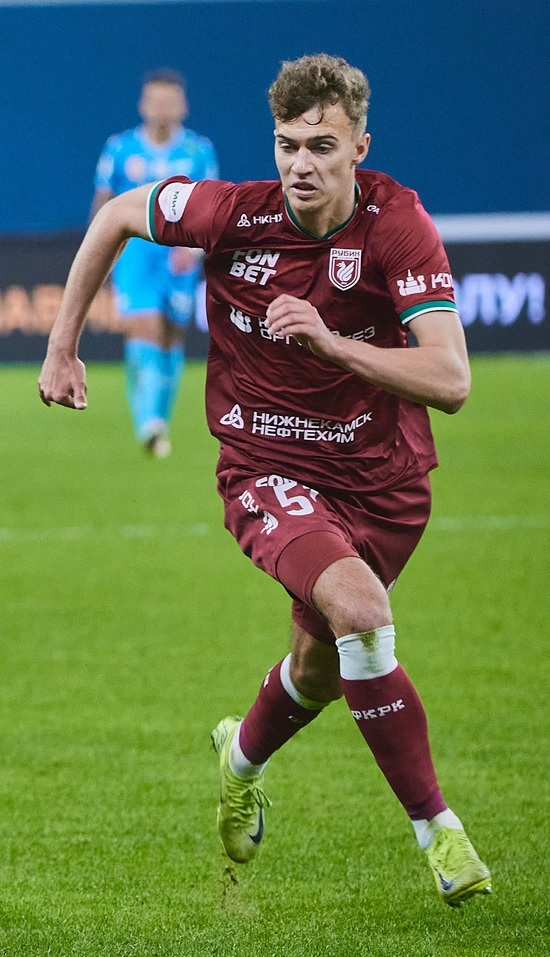
- Rozhkov with Rubin in 2025

Personal information
- Full name: Ilya Nikolayevich Rozhkov
- Date of birth: 29 March 2005 (age 21)
- Place of birth: Zelenodolsk, Russia
- Height: 1.80 m (5 ft 11 in)
- Positions: Left-back; centre-back

Team information
- Current team: Rubin Kazan
- Number: 51

Youth career
- Rubin Kazan

Senior career*
Years	Team	Apps	(Gls)
2022–	Rubin Kazan	87	(4)

International career^{‡}
2019–2020	Russia U15	6	(1)
2021	Russia U16	3	(0)
2021	Russia U17	4	(1)
2022	Russia U18	4	(0)
2023–	Russia U21	8	(0)
- * Club domestic league appearances and goals as of 21 November 2026 ‡ National team caps and goals as of 8 June 2025

Ilya Nikolayevich Rozhkov (Russian: Илья Николаевич Рожков; born 29 March 2005) is a Russian football player who plays as a defender for Rubin Kazan.

== Club career ==
Rozhkov made his debut in the Russian Premier League for Rubin Kazan on 22 July 2023 in a game against Lokomotiv Moscow, recording an assist. He is the youngest player to record an assist in the history of the club.

On 20 December 2023, Rozhkov extended his contract with Rubin until the summer of 2027. On 5 December 2024, the contract was extended to 2028.

== International career ==
Rozhkov was called up to the Russia national team for the first time in June 2025 for friendlies against Nigeria and Belarus.

== Career statistics ==
As of match played 21 November 2026

Appearances and goals by club, season and competition
Club	Season	League			Cup		Total	
Club	Season	Division	Apps	Goals	Apps	Goals	Apps	Goals
Rubin Kazan	2022–23	Russian First League	0	0	0	0	0	0
Rubin Kazan	2023–24	Russian Premier League	18	1	3	0	21	1
Rubin Kazan	2024–25	Russian Premier League	27	2	4	1	31	3
Rubin Kazan	2025–26	Russian Premier League	28	0	6	0	34	0
Rubin Kazan	2026–27	Russian Premier League	14	1	4	0	18	1
Rubin Kazan	Total		87	4	17	1	104	5
Career total			87	4	17	1	104	5
