= Daniil Motorin =

Russian association football player

Personal information
- Full name: Daniil Nikolaevich Motorin
- Date of birth: 16 July 2004 (age 22)
- Place of birth: Chelyabinsk, Russia
- Height: 1.85 m (6 ft 1 in)
- Position: Centre-forward

Team information
- Current team: Rubin Kazan
- Number: 59

Youth career
- –2016: DYuSSh Signal Chelyabinsk
- 2017–2022: Rubin Kazan

Senior career*
Years	Team	Apps	(Gls)
2021–	Rubin Kazan	11	(0)
2023	→ Kosmos Dolgoprudny (loan)	12	(3)
2023–2024	→ Rubin-2 Kazan	41	(14)
2025	→ KAMAZ Naberezhnye Chelny (loan)	30	(8)

International career^{‡}
2019–2020	Russia U-17	5	(2)
2025–	Russia U-21	5	(3)
- * Club domestic league appearances and goals as of 31 October 2026 ‡ National team caps and goals as of 23:00, 27 December 2025 (UTC)

Daniil Nikolaevich Motorin (Russian: Даниил Николаевич Моторин; born 16 July 2004) is a Russian football player who plays as a centre-forward for Rubin Kazan.

== Club career ==
Motorin played a total of 105 matches for teams of Rubin Kazan system, scoring 39 goals and providing 13 assists.

Motorin joined Russian Second League club Kosmos Dolgoprudny on loan in February 2023. and played for this team in the spring part of the 2022–23 season.

In the 2023 and 2024 seasons he played for Rubin-2 Kazan. In the 2024 season, he scored 13 goals in 25 matches, finishing second in Group 4 of the Russian Second League top scorers list and was named the best young player in this group.

On 23 January 2025, Motorin was loaned by KAMAZ Naberezhnye Chelny. He made his debut in the Russian First League for KAMAZ on 1 March 2025 in a game against Arsenal Tula, coming out in the starting lineup and playing the full 90 minutes.

In December 2025, FC Rubin Kazan recalled Motorin from his loan; the player took part in Rubin's January training camp. He made his Russian Premier League debut for Rubin on 28 February 2026 against Dynamo Makhachkala.

== International career ==
On 6 September 2025, he made his debut for the Russian youth team (under 21), scoring a goal in a friendly match against the Saudi Arabian national team (under 23). In November 2025, as part of the team, he won the Manas Cup international tournament.

Previously, in 2019–20, he played for the Russian youth team (players born in 2004).

== Career statistics ==
As of 31 October 2026

Club	Season	League			Cup		Total	
Club	Season	Division	Apps	Goals	Apps	Goals	Apps	Goals
Rubin Kazan	2022–23	Russian First League	0	0	1	0	1	0
Rubin Kazan	2025–26	Russian Premier League	5	0	–		5	0
Rubin Kazan	2026–27	Russian Premier League	6	0	4	0	10	0
Rubin Kazan	Total		11	0	5	0	16	0
Kosmos Dolgoprudny (loan)	2022–23	Russian Second League	12	3	–		12	3
Rubin-2 Kazan	2023	Russian Second League B	16	1	–		16	1
Rubin-2 Kazan	2024	Russian Second League B	25	13	–		25	13
Rubin-2 Kazan	Total		41	14	0	0	41	14
KAMAZ Naberezhnye Chelny (loan)	2024–25	Russian First League	13	4	–		13	4
KAMAZ Naberezhnye Chelny (loan)	2025–26	Russian First League	17	4	4	1	21	5
KAMAZ Naberezhnye Chelny (loan)	Total		30	8	4	1	34	9
Career total			94	25	9	1	103	26
