= Yegor Teslenko =

Russian footballer

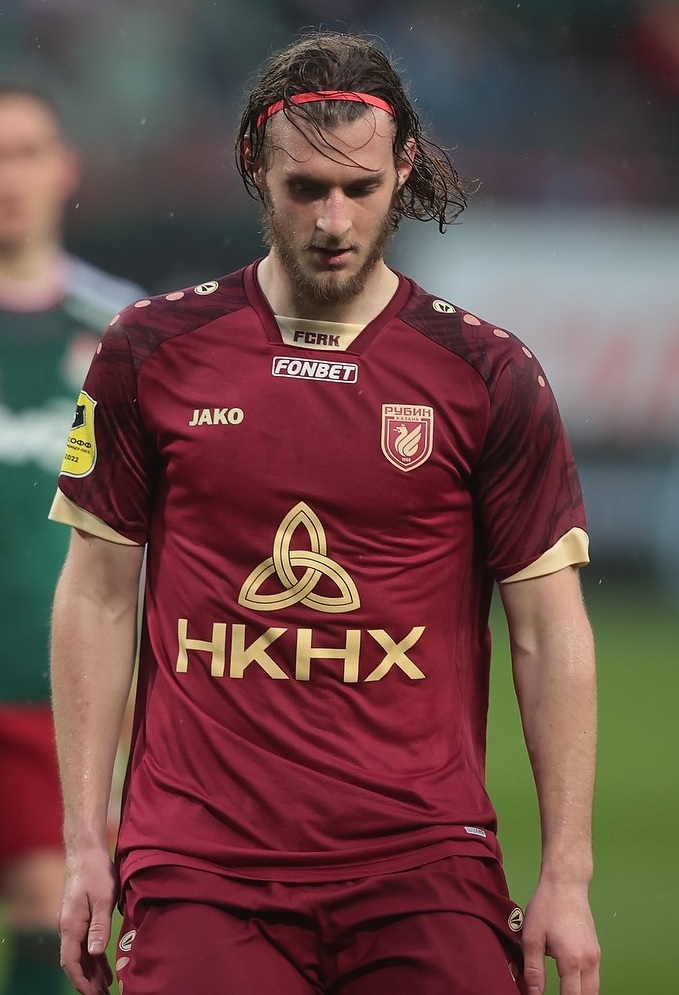
- Teslenko with Rubin Kazan in 2022

Personal information
- Full name: Yegor Igorevich Teslenko
- Date of birth: 31 January 2001 (age 25)
- Place of birth: Krasnodar, Russia
- Height: 1.90 m (6 ft 3 in)
- Position: Centre-back

Team information
- Current team: FC Rubin Kazan
- Number: 2

Youth career
- –2017: Krasnodar Krai Football Academy
- 2019–2020: PFC CSKA Moscow

Senior career*
Years	Team	Apps	(Gls)
2017–2018	FC Kuban-2 Krasnodar	14	(1)
2018–2019	FC Urozhay Krasnodar	0	(0)
2020–2022	FC KAMAZ Naberezhnye Chelny	44	(6)
2022–	FC Rubin Kazan	110	(8)
- * Club domestic league appearances and goals as of 21 November 2026

Yegor Igorevich Teslenko (Russian: Егор Игоревич Тесленко; born 31 January 2001) is a Russian football player who plays for FC Rubin Kazan.

== Club career ==
He made his debut in the Russian Football National League for FC KAMAZ Naberezhnye Chelny on 10 July 2021 in a game against FC Alania Vladikavkaz.

On 17 February 2022, Teslenko signed a contract until the summer of 2026 with FC Rubin Kazan. He made his Russian Premier League debut for Rubin on 14 March 2022 against FC Rostov.

On 15 July 2025, his contract with Rubin was extended to 2029.

== Career statistics ==
As of match played 21 November 2026

Appearances and goals by club, season and competition
Club	Season	League			Cup		Total	
Club	Season	Division	Apps	Goals	Apps	Goals	Apps	Goals
Kuban-2 Krasnodar	2017–18	Russian Second League	14	1	—		14	1
Urozhay Krasnodar	2018–19	Russian Second League	0	0	1	0	1	0
KAMAZ	2020–21	Russian Second League	21	1	1	0	22	1
KAMAZ	2021–22	Russian First League	23	5	1	0	24	5
KAMAZ	Total		44	6	2	0	46	6
Rubin Kazan	2021–22	Russian Premier League	10	0	1	0	11	0
Rubin Kazan	2022–23	Russian First League	23	3	1	0	24	3
Rubin Kazan	2023–24	Russian Premier League	10	0	3	1	13	1
Rubin Kazan	2024–25	Russian Premier League	27	3	6	0	33	3
Rubin Kazan	2025–26	Russian Premier League	27	1	7	1	34	2
Rubin Kazan	2026–27	Russian Premier League	13	1	3	0	18	1
Rubin Kazan	Total		110	8	21	2	131	10
Career total			168	15	24	2	192	17
