= Aleksandar Jukić =

Austrian footballer

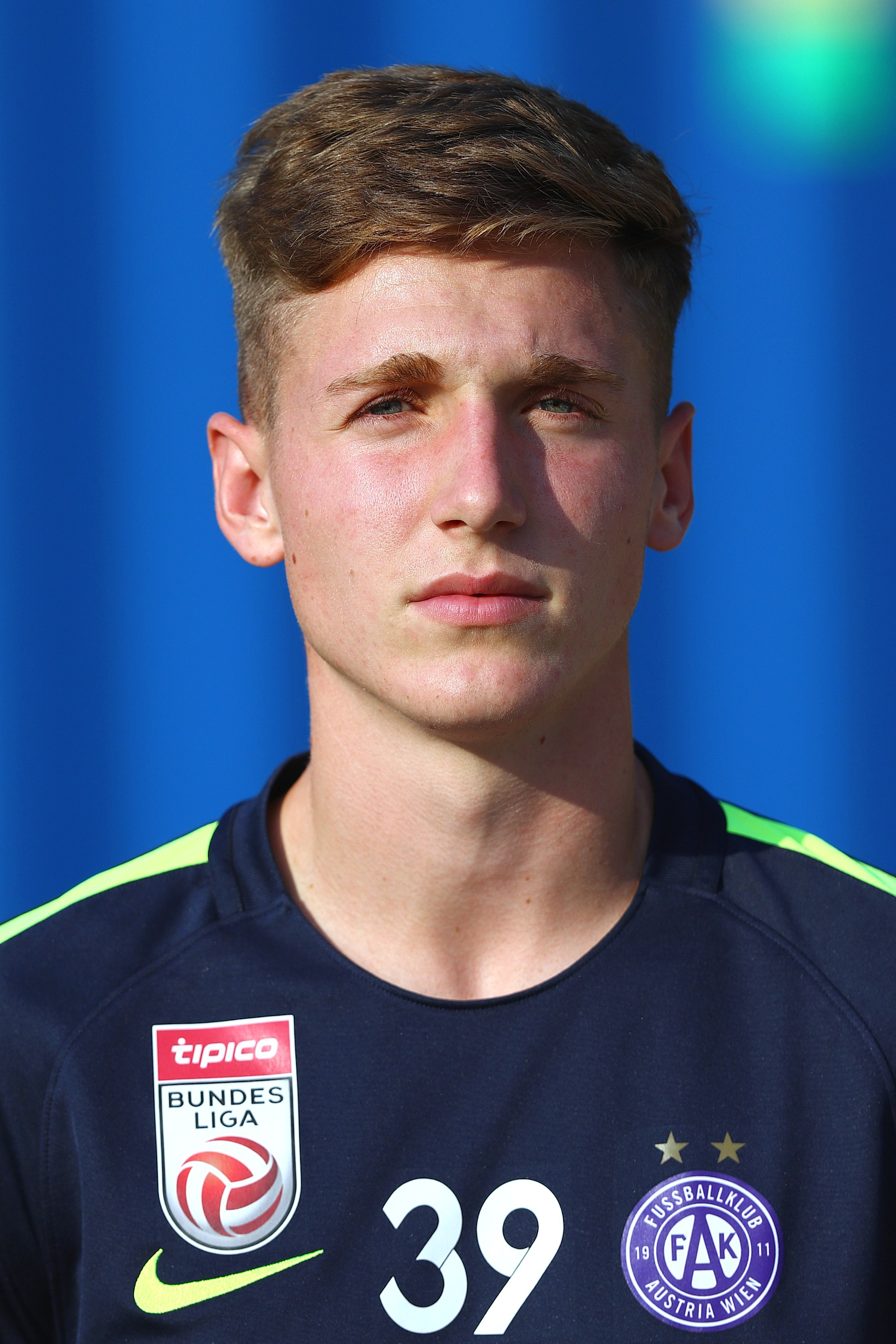
- Jukić prior to a match against Wiener Neustadt in 2018

Personal information
- Date of birth: 26 July 2000 (age 26)
- Place of birth: Vienna, Austria
- Height: 1.83 m (6 ft 0 in)
- Position: Central midfielder

Team information
- Current team: Rubin Kazan
- Number: 77

Youth career
- 2007–2014: 1. Simmeringer SC
- 2014–2020: Austria Wien

Senior career*
Years	Team	Apps	(Gls)
2018–2020	Austria Wien II	43	(9)
2020–2024	Austria Wien	95	(10)
2024	Sochi	12	(1)
2024–	Rubin Kazan	21	(3)

International career^{‡}
2017	Austria U17	1	(0)
2021	Austria U21	1	(0)
- * Club domestic league appearances and goals as of 12 September 2026 ‡ National team caps and goals as of 22 November 2021

Aleksandar Jukić (born 26 July 2000) is an Austrian footballer who plays as a central midfielder or an attacking midfielder for Russian club Rubin Kazan. He is versatile and has been deployed in many other midfield positions.

== Career ==
=== Austria Wien ===
A graduate of the club's youth academy, Jukić made his professional debut on 3 August 2018, appearing for Austria Wien II in a 4–3 victory over Horn, scoring his first professional goal in that same match. After emerging as a first team regular the following season, he made his debut for the senior team in July 2020, starting in a 1–0 victory over Mattersburg. He would score his first goal for the first team in November 2020, rescuing a late draw against St. Pölten. In March 2021, Jukić signed a three-year contract extension with the club.

=== Sochi ===
On 16 January 2024, Jukić signed with Russian Premier League club Sochi. Sochi was relegated at the end of the season.

=== Rubin Kazan ===
On 29 June 2024, Jukić signed a four-year contract with Russian Premier League club Rubin Kazan.

== Career statistics ==
=== Club ===
As of match played 12 September 2026

Appearances and goals by club, season and competition
Club	Season	League			Cup		Europe		Other		Total	
Club	Season	Division	Apps	Goals	Apps	Goals	Apps	Goals	Apps	Goals	Apps	Goals
Austria Wien II	2018–19	Austrian Football Second League	19	2	—		—		—		19	2
Austria Wien II	2019–20	Austrian Football Second League	22	6	—		—		—		22	6
Austria Wien II	2020–21	Austrian Football Second League	1	1	—		—		—		1	1
Austria Wien II	Total		42	9	—		—		—		42	9
Austria Wien	2018–19	Austrian Bundesliga	0	0	—		—		—		0	0
Austria Wien	2019–20	Austrian Bundesliga	1	0	—		—		1 (Note: Includes appearance(s) in the Austrian Football Bundesliga Europa Conference League play-offs)	0	2	0
Austria Wien	2020–21	Austrian Bundesliga	23	2	4 (Note: Includes appearances in the Austrian Cup)	0	—		2	0	29	2
Austria Wien	2021–22	Austrian Bundesliga	26	5	2	1	2 (Note: Includes appearances in the UEFA Europa Conference League)	0	—		30	6
Austria Wien	2022–23	Austrian Bundesliga	29	3	3	4	6 (Note: Five appearances in the UEFA Europa Conference League, one appearance in the UEFA Europa League)	0	—		38	7
Austria Wien	2023–24	Austrian Bundesliga	16	0	3	1	—		—		19	1
Austria Wien	Total		95	10	12	6	8	0	3	0	120	16
Austria Wien II	2022–23	2. Liga	1	0	—		—		—		1	0
Sochi	2023–24	Russian Premier League	12	1	1	0	—		—		13	1
Rubin Kazan	2024–25	Russian Premier League	4	1	2	1	—		—		6	2
Rubin Kazan	2025–26	Russian Premier League	12	1	4	0	—		—		16	1
Rubin Kazan	2026–27	Russian Premier League	5	1	2	0	—		—		7	1
Rubin Kazan	Total		21	3	8	1	0	0	0	0	29	4
Career total			171	23	20	7	8	0	3	0	204	30
