= Ugochukwu Iwu =

Armenian footballer (born 1999)

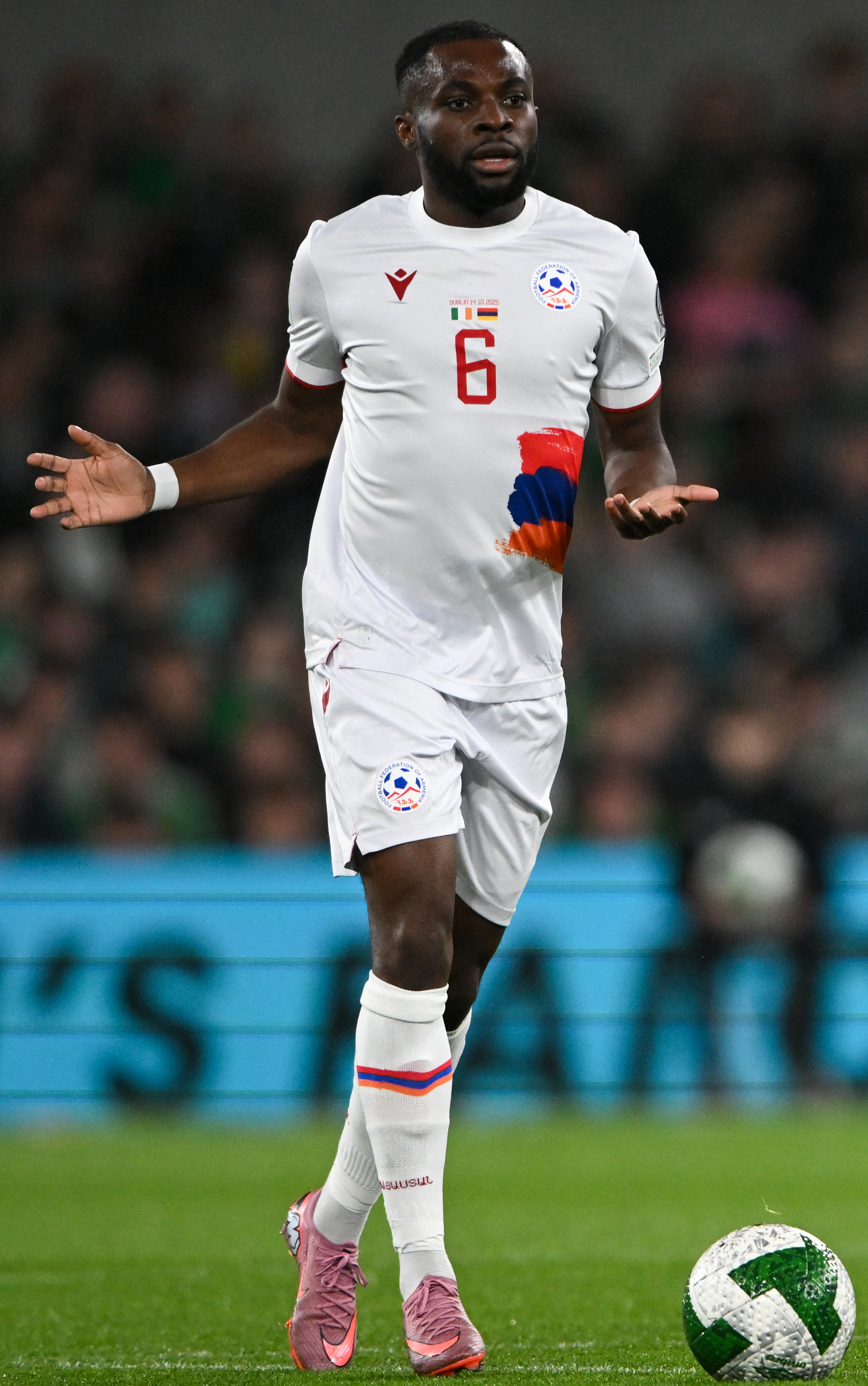
- Iwu with Armenia in 2025

Personal information
- Full name: Ugochukwu Christus Iwu
- Date of birth: 28 November 1999 (age 26)
- Place of birth: Jos, Plateau State, Nigeria
- Height: 1.76 m (5 ft 9 in)
- Position: Defensive midfielder

Team information
- Current team: Rubin Kazan
- Number: 6

Youth career
- 2006–2018: El-Kanemi Warriors

Senior career*
Years	Team	Apps	(Gls)
2018–2020	Lori	48	(6)
2019–2020	→ Pyunik (loan)	14	(0)
2020–2023	Urartu	84	(8)
2023–	Rubin Kazan	78	(1)

International career^{‡}
2023–	Armenia	27	(0)
- * Club domestic league appearances and goals as of 21 November 2026 ‡ National team caps and goals as of 15 November 2026

Ugochukwu Christus Iwu (Armenian: Ուգոչուկվու Քրիստուս Իվու; born 28 November 1999) is a professional footballer who plays as a defensive midfielder for Russian Premier League club Rubin Kazan. Born in Nigeria, he represents Armenia at international level.

== Club career ==
In August 2019, Iwu joined Pyunik on a season-long loan deal from Lori.

=== Urartu ===
In the summer 2020, Iwu moved to the Urartu. On 16 July 2023, Iwu left Urartu by mutual consent to join Rubin Kazan.

=== Rubin Kazan ===
On 16 July 2023, Rubin Kazan announced the signing of Iwu to a three-year contract.

== International career ==
On 20 March 2023, Ugochukwu Iwu received Armenian citizenship, which made him available to play for the Armenia national team.

Iwu made his international debut for Armenia on 25 March 2023 in the UEFA Euro 2024 qualifying, against Turkey. He played the entire match.

== Career statistics ==
=== Club ===
As of match played 21 November 2026

Appearances and goals by club, season and competition
Club	Season	League			National cup (Note: Includes Armenian Cup, Russian Cup)		Europe		Total	
Club	Season	Division	Apps	Goals	Apps	Goals	Apps	Goals	Apps	Goals
Lori	2017–18	Armenian First League	12	2	0	0	—		12	2
Lori	2018–19	Armenian Premier League	29	2	6	3	—		35	5
Lori	2019–20	Armenian Premier League	7	2	0	0	—		7	2
Lori	Total		48	6	6	3	0	0	54	9
Pyunik (loan)	2019–20	Armenian Premier League	14	0	1	0	0 (Note: Appearances in UEFA Europa League)	0	15	0
Urartu	2020–21	Armenian Premier League	21	2	4	0	—		25	2
Urartu	2021–22	Armenian Premier League	31	5	3	1	2 (Note: Appearances in the UEFA Europa Conference League)	0	36	6
Urartu	2022–23	Armenian Premier League	32	1	3	0	—		33	1
Urartu	2023–24	Armenian Premier League	0	0	0	0	1 (Note: Appearance in UEFA Champions League)	0	1	0
Urartu	Total		84	8	10	1	3	0	97	9
Rubin Kazan	2023–24	Russian Premier League	26	1	2	0	—		28	1
Rubin Kazan	2024–25	Russian Premier League	26	0	7	1	—		33	1
Rubin Kazan	2025–26	Russian Premier League	14	0	5	0	—		19	0
Rubin Kazan	2026–27	Russian Premier League	12	0	3	0	—		15	0
Rubin Kazan	Total		78	1	17	1	—		95	2
Career total			224	9	34	5	3	0	261	14

=== International ===
As of match played 15 November 2026

Appearances and goals by national team and year
National team	Year	Apps	Goals
Armenia	2023	9	0
Armenia	2024	6	0
Armenia	2025	6	0
Armenia	2026	6	0
Total		27	0

== Honours ==
Urartu

- Armenian Premier League: 2022–23
- Armenian Cup: 2022–23

Individual

- Armenian Premier League Player of the Year: 2022-23
