= Aleksandr Zotov =

Russian footballer

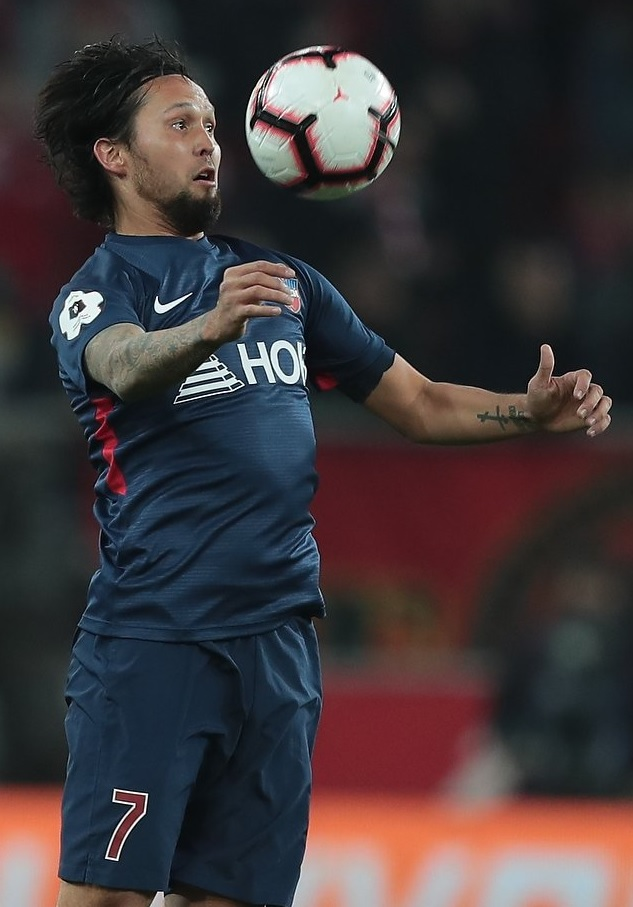
- Zotov with Yenisey Krasnoyarsk in 2019

Personal information
- Full name: Aleksandr Vladimirovich Zotov
- Date of birth: 27 August 1990 (age 36)
- Place of birth: Askiz, Khakas AO, Russian SFSR, Soviet Union
- Height: 1.72 m (5 ft 8 in)
- Position: Defensive midfielder

Youth career
- Spartak Moscow

Senior career*
Years	Team	Apps	(Gls)
2008–2016	Spartak Moscow	32	(0)
2011	→ Zhemchuzhina-Sochi (loan)	16	(1)
2012–2013	→ Tom Tomsk (loan)	15	(0)
2013	→ Spartak-2 Moscow	2	(0)
2013–2014	→ Shinnik Yaroslavl (loan)	26	(2)
2014–2015	→ Arsenal Tula (loan)	21	(2)
2016–2019	Dynamo Moscow	44	(5)
2018–2019	→ Yenisey Krasnoyarsk (loan)	25	(1)
2019–2022	Yenisey Krasnoyarsk	81	(8)
2022–2026	Rubin Kazan	85	(4)

International career
2008–2009	Russia U-19	9	(2)
2010–2013	Russia U-21	10	(0)
- * Club domestic league appearances and goals as of 17 May 2026

Aleksandr Vladimirovich Zotov (Russian: Алекса́ндр Влади́мирович Зо́тов; born 27 August 1990) is a Russian former football player, who played as a central midfielder.

== Club career ==
Zotov made his debut for Spartak in the Russian Premier League on 16 November 2008 in a game against Luch-Energiya Vladivostok. In November and December 2008, he participated in UEFA Cup games against Dinamo Zagreb, N.E.C., and Tottenham Hotspur. His second league appearance, however, came only on 21 July 2010.

== Career statistics ==
As of match played 17 May 2026

Appearances and goals by club, season and competition
Club	Season	League			Cup		Europe		Other		Total	
Club	Season	Division	Apps	Goals	Apps	Goals	Apps	Goals	Apps	Goals	Apps	Goals
Spartak Moscow	2008	Russian Premier League	1	0	0	0	3 (Note: Appearances in the UEFA Cup)	0	—		4	0
Spartak Moscow	2009	Russian Premier League	0	0	0	0	—		—		0	0
Spartak Moscow	2010	Russian Premier League	4	0	1	0	0	0	—		5	0
Spartak Moscow	2011–12	Russian Premier League	7	0	0	0	1 (Note: Appearances in the UEFA Europa League)	0	—		8	0
Spartak Moscow	2012–13	Russian Premier League	0	0	0	0	0	0	—		0	0
Spartak Moscow	2015–16	Russian Premier League	20	0	1	1	—		—		21	1
Spartak Moscow	Total		32	0	2	1	4	0	0	0	38	1
Zhemchuzhina-Sochi (loan)	2011–12	Russian First League	16	1	2	0	—		—		18	1
Tom Tomsk (loan)	2012–13	Russian First League	15	0	0	0	—		3 (Note: Appearances in the FNL Cup)	0	18	0
Spartak-2 Moscow	2013–14	Russian Second League	2	0	—		—		—		2	0
Shinnik Yaroslavl (loan)	2013–14	Russian First League	26	2	0	0	—		3	0	29	2
Arsenal Tula (loan)	2014–15	Russian Premier League	21	2	2	0	—		—		23	2
Dynamo Moscow	2016–17	Russian First League	30	3	3	0	—		—		33	3
Dynamo Moscow	2017–18	Russian Premier League	14	2	1	0	—		—		15	2
Dynamo Moscow	Total		44	5	4	0	0	0	0	0	48	5
Yenisey Krasnoyarsk (loan)	2018–19	Russian Premier League	25	1	2	0	–		–		27	1
Yenisey Krasnoyarsk	2019–20	Russian First League	17	0	2	0	—		4	0	23	0
Yenisey Krasnoyarsk	2020–21	Russian First League	34	4	2	0	—		—		36	4
Yenisey Krasnoyarsk	2021–22	Russian First League	30	4	6	0	—		—		36	4
Yenisey Krasnoyarsk	Total		81	8	10	0	0	0	4	0	95	8
Rubin Kazan	2022–23	Russian First League	32	2	0	0	—		—		32	2
Rubin Kazan	2023–24	Russian Premier League	26	0	3	0	—		—		29	0
Rubin Kazan	2024–25	Russian Premier League	22	2	5	0	—		—		27	2
Rubin Kazan	2025–26	Russian Premier League	5	0	3	0	—		—		8	0
Rubin Kazan	Total		85	4	11	0	0	0	0	0	96	4
Career total			347	23	33	1	4	0	10	0	394	24
