= Maksim Shiryayev (footballer, born 1995) =

Russian footballer

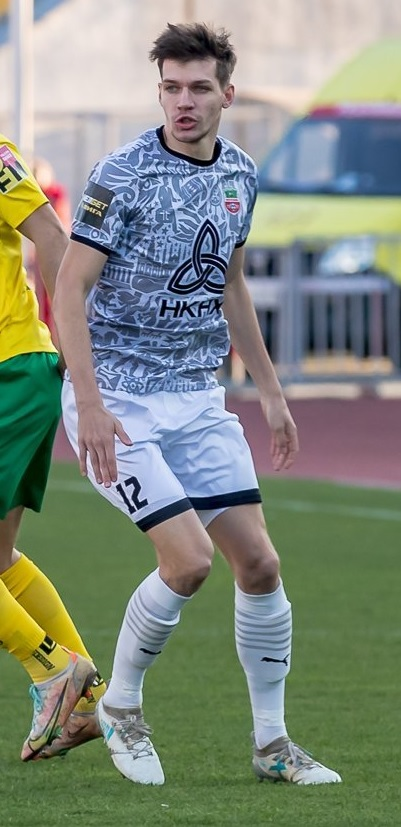
- Shiryayev with Neftekhimik in 2022

Personal information
- Full name: Maksim Sergeyevich Shiryayev
- Date of birth: 13 July 1995 (age 31)
- Place of birth: Moscow, Russia
- Height: 1.89 m (6 ft 2 in)
- Position: Centre back

Senior career*
| Years | Team | Apps | (Gls) |
| 2014 | FC Olimpik Mytishchi | | |
| 2015–2017 | FC Spartak Kostroma | 50 | (4) |
| 2017 | FSK Dolgoprudny | 5 | (0) |
| 2018 | FK Jelgava | 18 | (0) |
| 2019–2023 | FC Neftekhimik Nizhnekamsk | 114 | (2) |
| 2023 | FC Rubin Kazan | 2 | (0) |
| 2024 | FC Chelyabinsk | 18 | (1) |
| 2024 | FC Yenisey Krasnoyarsk | 11 | (0) |
| 2025–2026 | FC Neftekhimik Nizhnekamsk | 36 | (0) |
- * Club domestic league appearances and goals as of 16 May 2026

Maksim Sergeyevich Shiryayev (Russian: Максим Сергеевич Ширяев; born 13 July 1995) is a Russian football player.

== Club career ==
He made his debut in the Russian Professional Football League for FC Spartak Kostroma on 20 July 2015 in a game against FC Domodedovo Moscow.

He made his Russian Football National League debut for FC Neftekhimik Nizhnekamsk on 7 July 2019 in a game against FC Mordovia Saransk.

In February 2023, FC Rubin Kazan and FC Neftekhimik Nizhnekamsk agreed on his transfer. His contract with Rubin was terminated by mutual consent on 10 October 2023.
