= Yevgeni Staver =

Russian footballer

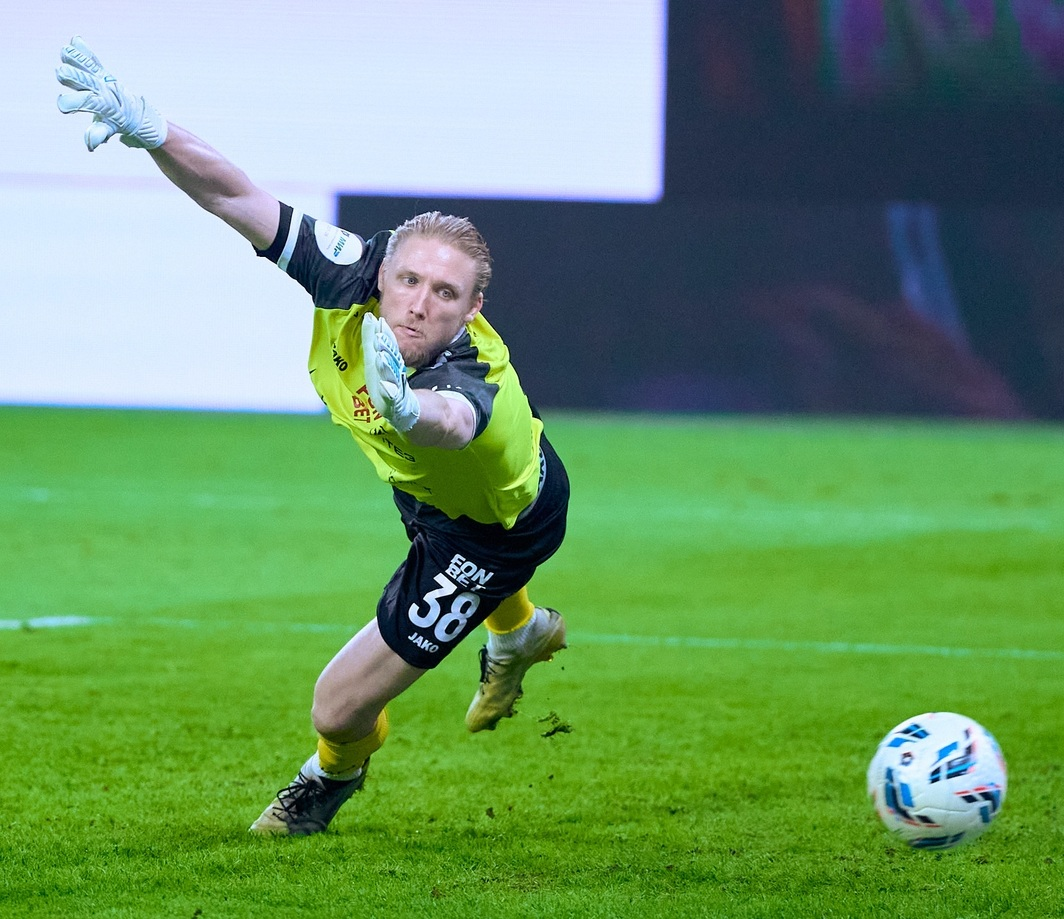
- Staver with Rubin Kazan in 2025

Personal information
- Full name: Yevgeni Yuryevich Staver
- Date of birth: 16 February 1998 (age 28)
- Place of birth: Irkutsk, Russia
- Height: 1.90 m (6 ft 3 in)
- Position: Goalkeeper

Team information
- Current team: Rubin Kazan
- Number: 38

Youth career
- –2013: Zenit Irkutsk
- 2014–2016: Baikal Irkutsk
- 2017: Vityaz Podolsk
- 2017–2018: Sibir Novosibirsk

Senior career*
Years	Team	Apps	(Gls)
2018–2019	Sibir-2 Novosibirsk	4	(0)
2019–2021	Novosibirsk	16	(0)
2021–2022	Olimp-Dolgoprudny	19	(0)
2022	→ Novosibirsk (loan)	8	(0)
2022–2024	Yenisey Krasnoyarsk	42	(0)
2024–	Rubin Kazan	73	(0)
- * Club domestic league appearances and goals as of 21 November 2026

Yevgeni Yuryevich Staver (Russian: Евгений Юрьевич Ставер; born 16 February 1998) is a Russian football player who plays for Rubin Kazan.

== Club career ==
Staver made his debut in the Russian Football National League for Olimp-Dolgoprudny on 14 August 2021 in a game against Yenisey Krasnoyarsk.

On 25 June 2024, Staver signed a three-year contract with Rubin Kazan. He made his Russian Premier League debut for Rubin on 3 August 2024 against Khimki.

== International career ==
In March 2025, Staver was called up to the national team for the first time for friendlies against Grenada and Zambia.

== Career statistics ==
As of 21 November 2026

Appearances and goals by club, season and competition
Club	Season	League			Cup		Other		Total	
Club	Season	Division	Apps	Goals	Apps	Goals	Apps	Goals	Apps	Goals
Baikal Irkutsk	2015–16	Russian First League	0	0	0	0	—		0	0
Sibir Novosibirsk	2018–19	Russian First League	0	0	0	0	—		0	0
Sibir-2 Novosibirsk	2018–19	Russian Second League	4	0	—		—		4	0
Novosibirsk	2019–20	Russian Second League	10	0	0	0	—		10	0
Novosibirsk	2020–21	Russian Second League	6	0	0	0	—		6	0
Novosibirsk	Total		16	0	0	0	—		16	0
Olimp-Dolgoprudny	2021–22	Russian First League	19	0	0	0	—		19	0
Novosibirsk (loan)	2021–22	Russian Second League	8	0	—		—		8	0
Yenisey Krasnoyarsk	2022–23	Russian First League	13	0	0	0	2 (Note: Appearances in the promotion play-offs)	0	15	0
Yenisey Krasnoyarsk	2023–24	Russian First League	29	0	1	0	—		30	0
Yenisey Krasnoyarsk	Total		42	0	1	0	2	0	45	0
Rubin Kazan	2024–25	Russian Premier League	28	0	4	0	—		32	0
Rubin Kazan	2025–26	Russian Premier League	30	0	0	0	—		30	0
Rubin Kazan	2026–27	Russian Premier League	15	0	0	0	—		15	0
Rubin Kazan	Total		73	0	4	0	0	0	77	0
Career total			162	0	5	0	2	0	169	0
