= FC Rubin-2 Kazan =

Russian football club

- Full name: Football Club Rubin-2 Kazan
- Founded: 2004
- Ground: Central Stadium
- Capacity: 25,400
- Manager: Andrei Fyodorov
- League: Russian Second League, Division B, Group 4
- 2026: 9th
- Website: www.rubin-kazan.ru
Home colours	Away colours

FC Rubin-2 Kazan (Russian: ФК «Рубин-2» Казань) is a Russian association football club from Kazan, founded in 1997. It played in the third-tier Russian Second League beginning in 2004. It is a farm club of FC Rubin Kazan. It was dissolved after the 2014–15 season. For the 2023–24 season, the team was re-established and admitted to the newly organized fourth-tier Russian Second League Division B.

== Current squad ==
As of 14 September 2026, according to the Second League website.

Note: Flags indicate national team as defined under FIFA eligibility rules; some limited exceptions apply. Players may hold more than one non-FIFA nationality.

No.	Pos.	Nation	Player
1	GK	RUS	Ivan Startsev
2	DF	RUS	Bulat Komarov
3	DF	RUS	Ivan Sergeyev
6	MF	RUS	Arseny Tolstov
7	MF	RUS	Lenar Fattakhov
8	MF	RUS	Ilya Yakovlev
9	FW	RUS	Maksim Yurin
11	MF	RUS	Yegor Chumarin
19	DF	RUS	Ilya Balyasnikov
20	DF	RUS	Adel Gaynulin
22	DF	RUS	Dmitry Zheltukhin
23	MF	RUS	Ulvi Babayev (on loan from Dynamo Moscow)
24	MF	RUS	Matvey Ivanov
27	DF	RUS	Aleksei Gritsayenko
29	MF	RUS	Ramazan Akhmetov
34	MF	RUS	Aydar Sayfutdinov

No.	Pos.	Nation	Player
38	GK	RUS	Yevgeni Staver
42	DF	RUS	Damir Bagautdinov
47	DF	RUS	Artyom Kiselenko
55	FW	RUS	Emil Galimullin
58	DF	RUS	Ramil Kalmurzin
59	FW	RUS	Daniil Motorin
71	DF	RUS	Konstantin Nizhegorodov
77	FW	RUS	Rival Gumerov
78	GK	RUS	Maksim Myshev
80	FW	RUS	Savva Chernov
81	MF	RUS	Vladimir Linyuchev
84	DF	RUS	Daniil Kiryagin
86	GK	RUS	Nikita Korets
88	MF	RUS	Prokhor Ilyin
91	GK	RUS	Amir Khayrulin
95	DF	RUS	Ilya Ivanov
