= 2022–23 FC Rubin Kazan season =

Rubin Kazan
2022–23 season
- General director: Aleksandr Aybatov
- Head coach: Rashid Rakhimov
- Stadium: Ak Bars Arena
- First League: 1st (promoted)
- Russian Cup: Fourth round
- Top goalscorer: League: Joel Fameyeh (11); All: Joel Fameyeh (11)
- Highest home attendance: 12,540; 27 May 2023 vs. Dynamo Makhachkala
- Lowest home attendance: 3,190; 27 November 2022 vs. Neftekhimik
- Average home league attendance: 8,273 (27 May 2023)
Home colours	Away colours	Third colours
- All statistics correct as of 3 June 2022.

The 2022–23 season was the 65th season in the existence of FC Rubin Kazan and the club's first appearance in the Russian First League after 19 consecutive seasons in the Russian Premier League. In addition, Rubin Kazan participated in the 2022–23 Russian Cup. The club finished first in the 2022-23 Russian First League (its second title at this level), guaranteeing a return to the Russian Premier League for the 2023–24 season.

== Squad ==
As of match played 27 May 2023

No.	Name	Nationality	Position	Date of birth (age)	Signed from	Signed in	Contract ends	2022–23 Season	Goals
Goalkeepers
22	Yury Dyupin	(Russia)	GK	17 March 1988 (age 38)	Anzhi Makhachkala	2019	2023	22	0
31	Aleksandr Belenov	(Russia)	GK	13 September 1986 (age 40)	Ufa	2022	2024	3	0
66	Nikita Yanovich	(Russia)	GK	28 March 2003 (age 23)	Akademia Rubin	2022	2025	0	0
86	Nikita Korets	(Russia)	GK	25 March 2005 (age 21)	Akademia Rubin	2022	N/A	0	0
Defenders
2	Yegor Teslenko	(Russia)	DF	31 January 2001 (age 25)	KAMAZ Naberezhnye Chelny	2022	2026	13	3
3	Elmir Nabiullin	(Russia)	DF	8 March 1995 (age 31)	Pari NN	2023	2023	2	0
4	Alyaksandr Martynovich	(Belarus)	DF	26 August 1987 (age 39)	Krasnodar	2022	2024	18	0
5	Rustam Ashurmatov	(Uzbekistan)	DF	7 July 1996 (age 30)	Krasnodar	2022	2024	4	0
8	Artyom Popov	(Russia)	DF	30 August 1992 (age 34)	Baltika Kaliningrad	2022	2024	16	0
12	Maksim Shiryayev	(Russia)	DF	13 July 1995 (age 31)	Neftekhimik Nizhnekamsk	2022	2024	2	0
27	Aleksei Gritsayenko	(Russia)	DF	25 May 1995 (age 31)	Tambov	2021	2024	21	1
53	Ali Adnan	(Iraq)	DF	19 December 1993 (age 32)	Vejle BK	2020	2023	7	0
70	Dmitri Kabutov	(Russia)	DF	26 March 1992 (age 34)	Ufa	2022	2025	21	1
77	Ilya Samoshnikov	(Russia)	DF	14 November 1997 (age 28)	Torpedo Moscow	2020	2023	21	1
97	Konstantin Nizhegorodov	(Russia) (Ukraine)	DF	21 June 2002 (age 24)	Hansa Rostok	2020	2024	2	1
Midfielders
6	Alan Dzagoev	(Russia)	MF	17 June 1990 (age 36)	CSKA Moscow	2020	2023	14	2
7	Soltmurad Bakayev	(Russia)	MF	5 August 1999 (age 27)	Spartak Moscow	2022	2026	3	0
9	Aleksandr Lomovitsky	(Russia)	MF	27 January 1998 (age 28)	Spartak Moscow	2020	2024	13	1
10	Darko Jevtić	(Switzerland)	MF	8 February 1993 (age 33)	Lech Poznań	2020	2024	0	0
11	Igor Gorbunov	(Russia)	MF	20 September 1994 (age 32)	Pari NN	2022	2024	19	1
14	Mikhail Kostyukov	(Russia)	MF	9 August 1991 (age 35)	Tambov	2021	2024	12	1
18	Marat Apshatsev	(Russia)	MF	27 May 2001 (age 25)	Tom Tomsk	2021	2026	10	0
19	Oleg Ivanov	(Russia)	MF	4 August 1986 (age 40)	Ufa	2022	2023	15	2
21	Aleksandr Zotov	(Russia)	MF	27 August 1990 (age 36)	Yenisey Krasnoyarsk	2022	2024	24	2
23	Ruslan Bezrukov	(Russia)	MF	27 August 1990 (age 36)	Neftekhimik Nizhnekamsk	2022	2026	15	1
33	Umarali Rakhmonaliev	(Uzbekistan)	MF	18 August 2003 (age 23)	Bunyodkor	2023	2026	3	0
38	Leon Musayev	(Russia)	MF	25 January 1999 (age 27)	Zenit St.Petersburg	2021	2025	8	2
55	Aleksandr Saplinov	(Russia)	MF	12 August 1997 (age 29)	Rostov	2022	2023	5	0
85	Daniil Kuznetsov	(Russia)	MF	23 April 2003 (age 23)	Zenit Saint Petersburg	2022	2026	1	0
Forwards
20	Joel Fameyeh	(Ghana)	FW	14 May 1997 (age 29)	FC Orenburg	2022	2026	23	6
44	Vitaly Lisakovich	(Belarus)	FW	8 February 1998 (age 28)	Lokomotiv Moscow	2022	2025	23	9
45	Dimitar Mitkov	(Bulgaria)	FW	27 January 2000 (age 26)	Lokomotiv Sofia	2023	2023	5	0
91	Merabi Uridia	(Russia)	FW	7 April 1993 (age 33)	Neftekhimik Nizhnekamsk	2023	2024	2	0

== Transfers ==
=== In ===
Date	Position	Nationality	Name	From	Fee	Ref.

=== Loans in ===
Date from	Position	Nationality	Name	From	Date to	Ref.

=== Out ===
Date	Position	Nationality	Name	To	Fee	Ref.

=== Loans out ===
Date from	Position	Nationality	Name	To	Date to	Ref.

=== Contract suspensions ===
Date	Position	Nationality	Name	Joined	Date	Ref.

=== Released ===
Date	Position	Nationality	Name	Joined	Date	Ref.

== Friendlies ==
=== Pre-season ===
20 June 2022	Rubin Kazan	0–0	Akron

24 June 2022	Rubin Kazan	5–0	KAMAZ

5 July 2022	Dynamo Moscow	2–0	Rubin Kazan

10 July 2022	Rubin Kazan	1–4	Ufa

=== Winter Break ===
18 January 2023	Akron	2–4	Rubin Kazan

21 January 2023	Beroe	0–2	Rubin Kazan

28 January 2023	Rubin Kazan	2–1	Krylia Sovetov

1 February 2023	Rubin Kazan	6–0	Navbahor

5 February 2023	Ufa	0–2	Rubin Kazan

16 February 2023	Akhmat Grozny	1–1	Rubin Kazan

19 February 2023	CSKA Moscow	0–2	Rubin Kazan

27 February 2023	Rubin Kazan	2–1	Shinnik

== Competitions ==
=== Overall record ===
Competition	First match	Last match	Starting round	Final position	Record							
Competition	First match	Last match	Starting round	Final position	Pld	W	D	L	GF	GA	GD	Win %
First League	17 July 2022	3 June 2023	Matchday 1	Winners	34	19	12	3	53	27	+26	55.88
Russian Cup	5 October 2022	5 October 2022	Fourth Round	Fourth Round	1	0	0	1	1	2	−1	0.00
Total					35	19	12	4	54	29	+25	54.29

Source: Soccerway

=== First League ===
==== League table ====
Pos	Team	Pld	W	D	L	GF	GA	GD	Pts	Promotion, qualification or relegation
1	Rubin Kazan (C, P)	34	19	12	3	53	27	+26	69	Promotion to Premier League
2	Baltika Kaliningrad (P)	34	18	13	3	56	30	+26	67	Promotion to Premier League
3	Alania Vladikavkaz	34	17	11	6	56	35	+21	62	Failed Russian Premier League licensing (Note: Alania Vladikavkaz failed to receive a 2023–24 Premier League license due to deficiencies with their stadium. Shinnik and Dynamo Makhachkala did not apply for the license.)
4	Yenisey Krasnoyarsk (Q)	34	13	15	6	43	35	+8	54	Qualification to Premier League play-offs
5	Rodina Moscow (Q)	34	13	11	10	42	38	+4	50	Qualification to Premier League play-offs

Source: Soccerway
Rules for classification: 1) Points; then in case of a two-way tie: 2) Head-to-head points; 3) Head-to-head matches won; 4) Head-to-head goal difference; 5) Head-to-head goals scored; 6) Head-to-head away goals scored; 7) Matches won; 8) Goal difference; 9) Goals scored; 10) Away goals scored; 11) Drawing lots; in case of a three-or-more-way tie: 2) Matches won; 3) Head-to-head points; 4) Head-to-head matches won; 5) Head-to-head goal difference; 6) Head-to-head goals scored; 7) Head-to-head away goals scored; 8) Goal difference; 9) Goals scored; 10) Away goals scored; 11) Drawing lots.
(C) Champions; (P) Promoted; (Q) Qualified for Promotion Playoffs

==== Results summary ====
Overall								Home						Away					
Pld	W	D	L	GF	GA	GD	Pts	W	D	L	GF	GA	GD	W	D	L	GF	GA	GD
34	19	12	3	53	27	+26	69	10	6	1	35	16	+19	9	6	2	18	11	+7

Source: FBref

==== Results by round ====
Round	1	2	3	4	5	6	7	8	9	10	11	12	13	14	15	16	17	18	19	20	21	22	23	24	25	26	27	28	29	30	31	32	33	34
Ground	H	A	H	A	H	A	H	H	A	H	A	H	A	H	A	H	A	H	A	H	A	H	A	A	H	A	H	A	H	A	H	A	H	A
Result	W	L	D	D	W	W	D	D	W	W	L	L	W	W	D	D	W	D	W	W	W	W	D	D	D	D	W	W	W	W	W	W	W	D
Position	1	8	8	10	4	3	4	5	3	2	4	6	6	4	5	5	4	5	4	3	2	2	2	2	2	2	2	2	2	2	2	1	1	1

Updated to match(es) played on 3 June 2023. Source: Premier Liga
A = Away; H = Home; W = Win; D = Draw; L = Loss

==== Matches ====
17 July 2022 1	Rubin Kazan	2–0	Rodina Moscow	Kazan
18:00 UTC+03:00	Fameyeh 44' (pen.) 52'; Fattakhov (yellow card) 71'	Report	Sangaré (yellow card) 43'; Baytukov (yellow card) 54'	Stadium: Ak Bars Arena; Attendance: 7,789; Referee: Ivan Sidenkov

17 July 2022 2	Yenisey	3–2	Rubin Kazan	Krasnoyarsk
13:00 UTC+03:00	Bardybakhin 16' (yellow card) 78' (yellow-red card) 90'; Glushkov 27'; Voronin (yellow card) 62'; Ivanov 66' (o.g.)	Report	Bakayev 32'; Kabutov 55'; Samoshnikov (yellow card) 90+7'	Stadium: Central Stadium; Attendance: 2,768; Referee: Evgeny Turbin

1 August 2022 3	Rubin Kazan	0–0	Ufa	Kazan
20:00 UTC+03:00	Apshatsev (yellow card) 15'; Lisakovich (yellow card) 89'	Report	Fishchenko (yellow card) 83'; Pliyev (yellow card) 89'; Kamilov (yellow card) 89'; Ortiz (yellow card) 90'	Stadium: Ak Bars Arena; Attendance: 11,880; Referee: Oleg Sokolov

8 August 2022 4	Neftekhimik	2–2	Rubin Kazan	Nizhnekamsk
18:00 UTC+03:00	Denisov 48'; Kotov 76'; Kalugin (yellow card) 77'; Berdnikov (yellow card) 86'; Dvoretskov (yellow card) 88'; Shkolik (yellow card) 89'	Report	Lisakovich 2'; Kabutov (yellow card) 46'; Ivanov (red card) 57'; Fameyeh 68'; Apshatsev (yellow card) 78'; Samoshnikov (yellow card) 90+3'	Stadium: Neftekhimik Stadium; Attendance: 3,012; Referee: Roman Galimov

15 August 2022 5	Rubin Kazan	3–0	Kuban Krasnodar	Kazan
19:30 UTC+03:00	Fameyeh 34' (yellow card) 62'; Zotov 38'; Martynovich (yellow card) 48'; Lisakovich 60' (pen.); Musayev (yellow card) 70'	Report	Abdokov (yellow card) 70'; Khomukha (yellow card) 71'; Golosov (yellow card) 82'	Stadium: Ak Bars Arena; Attendance: 9,346; Referee: Igor Panin

21 August 2022 6	Volga Ulyanovsk	1–2	Rubin Kazan	Ulyanovsk
12:45 UTC+03:00	Magomadov 25' (pen.); Sapeta (yellow card) 32' (yellow-red card) 36'; Yefremov (yellow card) 45+1'; Morozov (yellow card) 53'; Dzhikiya (yellow card) 82'	Report	Bakayev (yellow card) 9'; Musayev 12'; Fameyeh (yellow card) 32' (goal) 90+2'; Martynovich (yellow card) 45+1'; Ciupercă (yellow card) 52'; Kabutov (yellow card) 68'; Lisakovich (yellow card) 82'	Stadium: Trud Stadium; Attendance: 7,500; Referee: Igor Nizovtsev

28 August 2022 7	Rubin Kazan	1–1	KAMAZ	Kazan
18:00 UTC+03:00	Kabutov 16'; Martynovich (yellow card) 48'; Gorbunov (yellow card) 64'; Adnan (yellow card) 65'; Dyupin (yellow card) 81'	Report	Paltsev (yellow card) 4'; Talikin (yellow card) 12'; Mokhammad 90+3'; Shamkin (yellow card) 90+3'	Stadium: Ak Bars Arena; Attendance: 18,350; Referee: Roman Safyan

4 September 2022 8	Rubin Kazan	2–2	Alania	Kazan
18:00 UTC+03:00	Lisakovich 50'; Samoshnikov 65'	Report	Bagayev (yellow card) 31'; Mashukov 82' (pen.); Kochiyev 87'	Stadium: Ak Bars Arena; Attendance: 7,622; Referee: Alexey Sukhoi

11 September 2022 9	Veles	1–2	Rubin Kazan	Demodedovo
14:00 UTC+03:00	Logua 71'	Report	Musayev 58'; Gorbunov (yellow card) 61'; Teslenko 88'	Stadium: Avangard Stadium; Attendance: 1,050; Referee: Evgeny Bulanov

18 September 2022 10	Rubin Kazan	3–2	Volgar	Kazan
18:00 UTC+03:00	Dzagoev 32'; Bezrukov (yellow card) 40'; Kabutov 70' (yellow card) 78'; Lisakovich 76'	Report	Gilyazetdinov (yellow card) 12' (yellow-red card) 69'; Stefanovich (yellow card) 43'; Pechyonkin (yellow card) 72' (goal) 74'; Tsarukyan 86'	Stadium: Ak Bars Arena; Attendance: 5,096; Referee: Alexey Amelin

25 September 2022 11	Shinnik	1–0	Rubin Kazan	Yaroslavl
16:00 UTC+03:00	Zinkov (yellow card) 30'; Sokolov 57'; Semyonov (yellow card) 84'; Pokidyshev (yellow card) 89'	Report	Ciupercă (yellow card) 59'; Ivanov (yellow card) 83'	Stadium: Shinnik Stadium; Attendance: 2,300; Referee: Kirill Silantiev

1 October 2022 12	Rubin Kazan	1–2	Arsenal Tula	Kazan
16:00 UTC+03:00	Bezrukov (yellow card) 62'; Kabutov 68'	Report	Lutsenko 34', 42' (yellow card) 90+6'; Panchenko (yellow card) 45+2'; Sukhanov (yellow card) 69'; Grigoryan (yellow card) 74'; Pomerko (yellow card) 90'	Stadium: Ak Bars Arena; Attendance: 3,307; Referee: Yan Bobrovsky

9 October 2022 13	SKA-Khabarovsk	1–2	Rubin Kazan	Khabarovsk
10:00 UTC+03:00	Petrov (yellow card) 45+3' (goal) 62' (pen.)	Report	Ivanov 12', 89'; Kabutov (yellow card) 32'; Gorbunov (yellow card) 81'; Fameyeh (yellow card) 90+2'	Stadium: Lenin Stadium; Attendance: 1,800; Referee: Anton Frolov

16 October 2022 14	Rubin Kazan	5–2	Krasnodar-2	Kazan
16:00 UTC+03:00	Ivanov (yellow card) 14'; Bezrukov 28'; Kabutov 68'; Gorbunov 35' (yellow card) 44'; Nduka 49' (o.g.); Kostyukov 78'; Bakayev (yellow card) 81'; Lisakovich 83' (yellow card) 84'	Report	Kokoyev (yellow card) 38'; Karpov 48' (pen.); Samko 56'	Stadium: Ak Bars Arena; Attendance: 3,472; Referee: Anton Anopa

23 October 2022 15	Akron	0–0	Rubin Kazan	Zhigulyovsk
15:00 UTC+03:00	Paliyenko (yellow card) 16'; Savichev (yellow card) 90+1'	Report	Kabutov (yellow card) 51'; Bezrukov (yellow card) 59'; Fameyeh (yellow card) 74'	Stadium: Kristall Stadium; Attendance: 905; Referee: Artur Fedorov

30 October 2022 16	Rubin Kazan	3–3	Balitka	Kazan
15:00 UTC+03:00	Kabutov 43'; Lisakovich (yellow card) 55' (goal) 87'; Apshatsev (yellow card) 58'; Teslenko 58'; Fattakhov (yellow card) 79'	Report	Guzina 2', 37'; Ostojić 47'; Lazarev (yellow card) 79'	Stadium: Ak Bars Arena; Attendance: 3,295; Referee: Sergey Tsyganok

6 November 2022 17	Dynamo Makhachkala	0–1	Rubin Kazan	Kaspiysk
16:00 UTC+03:00	Alibekov (yellow card) 20'	Report	Apshatsev (yellow card) 75'; Fameyeh 87'	Stadium: Anzhi Arena; Attendance: 5,800; Referee: Konstantin Averyanov

13 November 2022 18	Rubin Kazan	0–0	Yenisey	Kazan
16:00 UTC+03:00	Dzagoev (yellow card) 30'; Martynovich (yellow card) 45'; Bezrukov (yellow card) 45'	Report	Stezhko (yellow card) 56'; Stolbov (yellow card) 86'; Razdorskikh (yellow card) 90' (yellow-red card) 90+3'	Stadium: Ak Bars Arena; Attendance: 3,428; Referee: Artem Chistyakov

20 November 2022 19	Ufa	1–2	Rubin Kazan	Ufa
12:00 UTC+03:00	Ortiz (yellow card) 4'; Temnikov 16'; Nikitin (yellow card) 70'	Report	Dzagoev (yellow card) 14'; Samoshnikov (yellow card) 45'; Lisakovich 45+1', 85'; Kabutov (yellow card) 57'	Stadium: BetBoom Arena; Attendance: 1,221; Referee: Ivan Saraev

27 November 2022 20	Rubin Kazan	2–0	Neftekhimik	Kazan
15:00 UTC+03:00	Dzagoev 30'; Nizhegorodov 60'; Lisakovich (yellow card) 72'	Report	Shkolik (yellow card) 43'; Shiryayev (yellow card) 74'	Stadium: Ak Bars Arena; Attendance: 3,190; Referee: Evgeny Kukulyak

6 March 2023 21	Kuban Krasnodar	1–2	Rubin Kazan	Krasnodar
12:00 UTC+03:00	Abdokov 45' (yellow card) 63'	Report	Samoshnikov (yellow card) 38'; Zotov 41' (yellow card) 43'; Gritsayenko 49'; Bezrukov (yellow card) 76'	Stadium: Kuban Stadium; Attendance: 877; Referee: Artur Fedorov

12 March 2023 22	Rubin Kazan	1–0	Volga	Kazan
15:00 UTC+03:00	Lisakovich 4'; Gorbunov (yellow card) 49' (yellow-red card); Gritsayenko (yellow card) 45+2'; Martynovich (yellow card) 56'; Fameyeh (yellow card) 74'; Ashurmatov (yellow card) 82'	Report	Dashayev (yellow card) 45'; Paskin (yellow card) 90'	Stadium: Ak Bars Arena; Attendance: 5,730; Referee: Andrey Fisenko

18 March 2023 23	KAMAZ	0–0	Rubin Kazan	Naberezhnye Chelny
17:00 UTC+03:00	Gagloyev (yellow card) 31'; Shamkin (yellow card) 36'; Mokhammad (yellow card) 52'; Girayev (yellow card) 75'; Babayev (yellow card) 85'; Reikhmen (yellow card) 90+3'	Report	Lomovitsky (yellow card) 33'; Mitkov (yellow card) 45'; Bakayev (yellow card) 87'; Gritsayenko (yellow card) 90+5'	Stadium: KAMAZ stadium Attendance: 6,093; Referee: Oleg Sokolov

25 March 2023 24	Alania	0–0	Rubin Kazan	Grozny
13:00 UTC+03:00	Butayev (yellow card) 5'	Report	Kabutov (yellow card) 90+5'	Stadium: Akhmat-Arena; Attendance: 1,070; Referee: Alexey Amelin

2 April 2023 25	Rubin Kazan	1–1	Veles	Kazan
15:00 UTC+03:00	Teslenko 20'; Rakhmonaliev (yellow card) 90+6'	Report	Batsuyev 69' (yellow card) 84'; Pesikov (yellow card) 90+3'	Stadium: Ak Bars Arena; Attendance: 8,707; Referee: Sergey Kulikov

7 April 2023 26	Volgar	0–0	Rubin Kazan	Astrakhan
18:00 UTC+03:00		Report	Teslenko (yellow card) 10'; Uridia (yellow card) 42'; Fameyeh (yellow card) 45+2'; Ivanov (yellow card) 83'	Stadium: Central Stadium; Attendance: 3,783; Referee: Vasily Kazartsev

15 April 2023 27	Rubin Kazan	3–0	Shinnik	Kazan
16:00 UTC+03:00	Lisakovich 14' (pen.); Kabutov 73' (yellow card) 76'; Dzagoev 86'	Report	Semeykin (yellow card) 59'; Batyutin (red card) 89'	Stadium: Ak Bars Arena; Attendance: 8,275; Referee: Konstantin Averyanov

21 April 2023 28	Arsenal Tula	0–1	Rubin Kazan	Tula
19:30 UTC+03:00	Kaynov (yellow card) 11'; Stepanov (red card) 42'; Khromov (yellow card) 88'	Report	Fameyeh 47'	Stadium: Arsenal Stadium; Attendance: 2,610; Referee: Evgeny Bulanov

29 April 2023 29	Rubin Kazan	3–1	SKA-Khabarovsk	Kazan
18:00 UTC+03:00	Aphshatsev 19'; Uridia 26'; Samoshnikov 34'; Gritsayenko (yellow card) 46'	Report	Fomin (yellow card) 4'; Anisimov (yellow card) 34'; Musalov (yellow card) 43'; Charles 65'	Stadium: Ak Bars Arena; Attendance: 10,031; Referee: Roman Safyan

6 May 2023 30	Krasnodar-2	0–1	Rubin Kazan	Krasnodar
19:00 UTC+03:00	Nduka (yellow card) 7'; Yarlykov (yellow card) 57'; Samko (yellow card) 88'	Report	Kabutov (yellow card) 9'; Gritsayenko (yellow card) 45'; Zotov (yellow card) 82'; Fameyeh 89'	Stadium: Krasnodar Academy Stadium; Attendance: 2,627; Referee: Nikolai Voloshin

13 May 2023 31	Rubin Kazan	3–2	Akron	Kazan
18:00 UTC+03:00	Ashurmatov 4' (yellow card) 22'; Uridia 7'; Fameyeh 17' (yellow card) 37'; Kabutov (yellow card) 80'	Report	Apekov 13'; Savichev (yellow card) 29'; Zuyev (yellow card) 86'; Eldarushev 90+2'	Stadium: Ak Bars Arena; Attendance: 10,317; Referee: Rafael Shafeev

20 May 2023 32	Baltika	0–1	Rubin Kazan	Kaliningrad
21:30 UTC+03:00	Musayev (yellow card) 45+1'; Dudiyev (yellow card) 55'	Report	Teslenko (yellow card) 15'; Apshatsev 45+2' (yellow card) 87'; Gritsayenko (yellow card) 77'; Dyupin (yellow card) 89'	Stadium: Kaliningrad Stadium; Attendance: 32,682; Referee: Yan Bobrovsky

27 May 2023 33	Rubin Kazan	2–0	Dynamo Makhachkala	Kazan
18:00 UTC+03:00	Fameyeh (yellow card) 32' (goal) 41', 52'; Samoshnikov (yellow card) 43'; Apshatsev (yellow card) 85' (yellow-red card) 90+1'	Report		Stadium: Ak Bars Arena; Attendance: 12,540; Referee: Vladimir Seldyakov

3 June 2023 34	Rodina	0–0	Rubin Kazan	Moscow
14:00 UTC+03:00	Kamyshev (yellow card) 8' (yellow-red card) 53'; Gordyushenko (yellow card) 31'	Report	Nizhegorodov (yellow card) 82'; Bakayev (yellow card) 86'; Lisakovich (yellow card) 88'; Uridia (yellow card) 89'	Stadium: Spartak Moscow Cherenkov Academy Stadium; Attendance: 776; Referee: Alexey Sukhoi

=== Russian Cup ===
5 October 2022 Fourth Round	Volga Ulyanovsk	2–1	Rubin Kazan	Ulyanovsk
15:00	Morozov 22'; Maksimenkov (yellow card) 34'; Sapeta 66'; Magomadov (yellow card) 68'; Gapechkin (yellow card) 87'; Dzhikiya (yellow card) 90+2'; Klimovich (yellow card) 90+5'	Report	Kosarev 1'; Apshatsev (yellow card) 21'; Bakayev (yellow card) 89'	Stadium: Trud Stadium; Attendance: 2,600; Referee: Mikhail Cheremnykh

== Squad statistics ==
=== Appearances and goals ===
No.	Pos	Nat	Player	Total		Premier League		Russian Cup	
No.	Pos	Nat	Player	Apps	Goals	Apps	Goals	Apps	Goals
2	DF	(Russia) RUS	Yegor Teslenko	19	3	15+3	3	1	0
3	DF	(Russia) RUS	Elmir Nabiullin	3	0	2+1	0	0	0
4	DF	(Belarus) BLR	Alyaksandr Martynovich	26	0	26	0	0	0
5	DF	(Uzbekistan) UZB	Rustam Ashurmatov	5	1	2+3	1	0	0
6	MF	(Russia) RUS	Alan Dzagoev	19	3	15+4	3	0	0
7	MF	(Russia) RUS	Soltmurad Bakayev	16	1	3+12	1	1	0
8	DF	(Russia) RUS	Artyom Popov	18	0	9+8	0	1	0
9	MF	(Russia) RUS	Aleksandr Lomovitsky	8	0	3+5	0	0	0
11	MF	(Russia) RUS	Igor Gorbunov	23	1	15+7	1	1	0
12	DF	(Russia) RUS	Maksim Shiryayev	2	0	1+1	0	0	0
14	MF	(Russia) RUS	Mikhail Kostyukov	17	1	6+10	1	1	0
18	MF	(Russia) RUS	Marat Apshatsev	20	2	17+2	2	1	0
19	MF	(Russia) RUS	Oleg Ivanov	22	2	11+11	2	0	0
20	FW	(Ghana) GHA	Joel Fameyeh	30	11	27+3	11	0	0
21	MF	(Russia) RUS	Aleksandr Zotov	31	2	30+1	2	0	0
22	GK	(Russia) RUS	Yury Dyupin	29	0	29	0	0	0
23	MF	(Russia) RUS	Ruslan Bezrukov	17	1	14+3	1	0	0
27	DF	(Russia) RUS	Aleksei Gritsayenko	29	1	26+2	1	0+1	0
31	GK	(Russia) RUS	Aleksandr Belenov	4	0	3	0	1	0
33	MF	(Uzbekistan) UZB	Umarali Rakhmonaliev	4	0	4	0	0	0
38	MF	(Russia) RUS	Leon Musayev	8	2	5+3	2	0	0
44	FW	(Belarus) BLR	Vitaly Lisakovich	29	10	16+13	10	0	0
45	FW	(Bulgaria) BUL	Dimitar Mitkov	10	0	3+7	0	0	0
53	DF	(Russia) RUS	Ali Adnan	8	0	7+1	0	0	0
56	DF	(Russia) RUS	Lenar Fattakhov	7	0	2+4	0	1	0
66	GK	(Russia) RUS	Nikita Yanovich	1	0	1	0	0	0
70	DF	(Russia) RUS	Dmitri Kabutov	32	6	27+5	6	0	0
77	DF	(Russia) RUS	Ilya Samoshnikov	28	2	28	2	0	0
85	FW	(Russia) RUS	Daniil Kuznetsov	1	0	0+1	0	0	0
91	FW	(Russia) RUS	Merabi Uridia	10	2	8+2	2	0	0
97	DF	(Russia) RUS	Konstantin Nizhegorodov	5	1	3+1	1	1	0
Players away from the club on loan:
72	DF	(Russia) RUS	Kamil Mullin	11	0	4+7	0	0	0
Players who left Rubin Kazan during the season:
1	GK	(Russia) RUS	Nikita Medvedev	1	0	1	0	0	0
47	FW	(Russia) RUS	Kirill Kosarev	4	1	1+2	0	1	1
55	FW	(Russia) RUS	Aleksandr Saplinov	5	0	2+3	0	0	0
92	MF	(Russia) RUS	Valeriu Ciupercă	14	0	4+9	0	1	0
--	MF	(Russia) RUS	Kirill Moiseyev	1	0	0	0	0+1	0
--	MF	(Russia) RUS	Daniil Motorin	1	0	0	0	0+1	0

=== Goal scorers ===
Place	Position	Nation	Number	Name	Premier League	Russian Cup	Total
1	FW	(Ghana)	20	Joel Fameyeh	11	0	11
2	FW	(Russia)	44	Vitaly Lisakovich	10	0	10
3	MF	(Russia)	70	Dmitri Kabutov	6	0	6
4	DF	(Russia)	2	Yegor Teslenko	3	0	3
4	MF	(Russia)	6	Alan Dzagoev	3	0	3
6	MF	(Russia)	38	Leon Musayev	2	0	2
6	MF	(Russia)	19	Oleg Ivanov	2	0	2
6	MF	(Russia)	21	Aleksandr Zotov	2	0	2
6	DF	(Russia)	77	Ilya Samoshnikov	2	0	2
6	FW	(Russia)	91	Merabi Uridia	2	0	2
6	MF	(Russia)	18	Marat Apshatsev	2	0	2
12	MF	(Russia)	7	Soltmurad Bakayev	1	0	1
12	FW	(Russia)	47	Kirill Kosarev	0	1	1
12	MF	(Russia)	23	Ruslan Bezrukov	1	0	1
12	MF	(Russia)	11	Igor Gorbunov	1	0	1
12	MF	(Russia)	14	Mikhail Kostyukov	1	0	1
12	DF	(Russia)	97	Konstantin Nizhegorodov	1	0	1
12	DF	(Russia)	27	Aleksei Gritsayenko	1	0	1
12	DF	(Uzbekistan)	5	Rustam Ashurmatov	1	0	1
	OG			Opponent Own goal	1	0	1
				TOTALS	53	1	54

=== Clean sheets ===
Place	Position	Nation	Number	Name	Premier League	Russian Cup	Total
1	GK	(Russia)	22	Yury Dyupin	13	0	13
2	GK	(Russia)	1	Nikita Medvedev	1	0	1
2	GK	(Russia)	66	Nikita Yanovich	1	0	1
				TOTALS	15	0	15

=== Disciplinary record ===
Place	Position	Nation	Number	Name	Premier League		Russian Cup		Total	
Place	Position	Nation	Number	Name	Yellow card	Red card	Yellow card	Red card	Yellow card	Red card
1	DF	(Russia)	70	Dmitri Kabutov	10	0	0	0	10	0
2	FW	(Russia)	20	Joel Fameyeh	8	0	0	0	8	0
3	MF	(Russia)	18	Marat Apshatsev	6	1	1	0	7	1
4	FW	(Belarus)	44	Vitaly Lisakovich	6	0	0	0	6	0
5	MF	(Russia)	11	Igor Gorbunov	5	1	0	0	5	1
6	DF	(Russia)	4	Alyaksandr Martynovich	5	0	0	0	5	0
6	MF	(Russia)	23	Ruslan Bezrukov	5	0	0	0	5	0
6	DF	(Russia)	27	Aleksei Gritsayenko	5	0	0	0	5	0
6	DF	(Russia)	77	Ilya Samoshnikov	5	0	0	0	5	0
6	MF	(Russia)	7	Soltmurad Bakayev	4	0	1	0	5	0
11	MF	(Russia)	19	Oleg Ivanov	3	1	0	0	3	1
12	GK	(Russia)	22	Yuri Dyupin	2	0	0	0	2	0
12	DF	(Russia)	2	Yegor Teslenko	2	0	0	0	2	0
12	DF	(Uzbekistan)	5	Rustam Ashurmatov	2	0	0	0	2	0
12	MF	(Russia)	6	Alan Dzagoev	2	0	0	0	2	0
12	MF	(Russia)	21	Aleksandr Zotov	2	0	0	0	2	0
12	DF	(Russia)	56	Lenar Fattakhov	2	0	0	0	2	0
12	FW	(Russia)	91	Merabi Uridia	2	0	0	0	2	0
19	DF	(Iraq)	97	Konstantin Nizhegorodov	1	0	0	0	1	0
19	MF	(Russia)	9	Aleksandr Lomovitsky	1	0	0	0	1	0
19	MF	(Uzbekistan)	33	Umarali Rakhmonaliev	1	0	0	0	1	0
19	FW	(Bulgaria)	45	Dimitar Mitkov	1	0	0	0	1	0
19	DF	(Iraq)	53	Ali Adnan	1	0	0	0	1	0
19	DF	(Uzbekistan)	5	Rustam Ashurmatov	1	0	0	0	1	0
19	MF	(Russia)	38	Leon Musayev	1	0	0	0	1	0
Players who left during the season:
--	DF	(Russia)	22	Ilya Samoshnikov	3	0	0	0	3	0
--	MF	(Russia)	92	Valeriu Ciupercă	2	0	0	0	2	0
				TOTALS	87	4	2	0	89	4
