= 2021–22 FC Rubin Kazan season =

Rubin Kazan
2021–22 season
- General director: Rustem Saymanov
- Head coach: Leonid Slutsky
- Stadium: Kazan Arena
- Premier League: 15th (relegated)
- Russian Cup: Quarter-final vs Yenisey Krasnoyarsk
- UEFA Europa Conference League: Third qualifying round vs Raków Częstochowa
- Top goalscorer: League: Anders Dreyer (8); All: Anders Dreyer (8)
- Highest home attendance: 14,409 vs Spartak Moscow (24 July 2021)
- Lowest home attendance: 0 vs Rotor Volgograd (3 March 2022)
- Average home league attendance: 6,932 (21 May 2022)
| Home colours | Away colours | Third colours |
- All statistics correct as of 15 May 2022.

The 2021–22 season was the 64th season in the existence of FC Rubin Kazan and the club's 19th consecutive season in the top flight of Russian football. In addition to the domestic league, Rubin Kazan are participating in this season's editions of the Russian Cup and the inaugural season of the UEFA Europa Conference League.

== Season events ==
On 27 May, Rubin Kazan announced the signing of Sead Hakšabanović from IFK Norrköping to a five-year contract.

On 11 June, Rubin Kazan announced the signing of Konstantin Nizhegorodov from Hansa Rostock.

On 20 June, Rubin Kazan announced the permanent signing of Oliver Abildgaard from AaB on a contract until June 2024.

On 30 June, Rubin Kazan announced the signing of Ivan Savitskiy from Leningradets Leningrad Oblast to a four-year contract, and the signing of Vladislav Ignatyev from Lokomotiv Moscow to a one-year contract.

On 9 August, Rubin Kazan announced the signing of Montassar Talbi from Benevento to a four-year contract.

On 28 August, Rubin Kazan announced the signing of Anders Dreyer from Midtjylland to a five-year contract.

On 31 August, Darko Jevtić left Rubin Kazan to join AEK Athens on a season-long loan deal.

On 1 September, German Onugkha joined Rubin Kazan on loan from Vejle, with an option to make the move permanent, having started the season on loan at Krylia Sovetov.

On 3 September, Silvije Begić joined Krylia Sovetov on loan for the season.

On 18 November, Oleg Shatov left Rubin after his contract was terminated by mutual consent.

On 13 December, Rubin announced the signing of Marat Apshatsev from Tom Tomsk.

On 29 December, Rubin announced the signing of Aleksandr Lomovitsky from Spartak Moscow, whilst Danil Stepanov moved permanently to Arsenal Tula.

On 21 January, Rubin announced the signing of Vitaly Lisakovich from Lokomotiv Moscow on a contract until the summer of 2025.

On 17 February, Yegor Teslenko signed for Rubin from KAMAZ Naberezhnye Chelny.

On 20 February, Rubin announced the signing of Daniil Kuznetsov from Zenit St.Petersburg.

On 11 March, Rubin suspended their contracts with Anders Dreyer and Sead Hakšabanović until the summer of 2022. On 13 March, Filip Uremović also suspended his contract with Rubin until the summer of 2022.

On 24 March, Khvicha Kvaratskhelia suspended his contract with Rubin until the summer of 2022, and then joined Dinamo Batumi. On 26 March, Silvije Begić also suspended his contract with Rubin.

On 3 April, Hwang In-beom also suspended his contract with Rubin until the summer of 2022.

== Squad ==
As of match played 21 May 2022

| No. | Name | Nationality | Position | Date of birth (age) | Signed from | Signed in | Contract ends | Apps. | Goals |
Goalkeepers
| 1 | Nikita Medvedev | (Russia) | GK | 17 December 1994 (age 31) | Lokomotiv Moscow | 2020 | 2022 | 7 | 0 |
| 22 | Yury Dyupin | (Russia) | GK | 17 March 1988 (age 38) | Anzhi Makhachkala | 2019 | | 90 | 0 |
Defenders
| 2 | Yegor Teslenko | (Russia) | DF | 31 January 2001 (age 25) | KAMAZ Naberezhnye Chelny | 2022 | 2026 | 11 | 0 |
| 3 | Montassar Talbi | (Tunisia) | DF | 26 May 1998 (age 28) | Benevento | 2021 | 2025 | 27 | 0 |
| 20 | Vladislav Ignatyev | (Russia) | DF | 20 January 1987 (age 39) | Lokomotiv Moscow | 2021 | 2022 | 14 | 1 |
| 23 | Aleksandr Zuyev | (Russia) | DF | 26 June 1996 (age 30) | Rostov | 2020 | 2024 | 63 | 0 |
| 24 | Ivan Savitskiy | (Russia) | DF | 7 March 2003 (age 23) | Leningradets Leningrad Oblast | 2021 | 2025 | 1 | 0 |
| 31 | Georgi Zotov | (Russia) | DF | 12 January 1990 (age 36) | Krylia Sovetov | 2020 | | 48 | 0 |
| 77 | Ilya Samoshnikov | (Russia) | DF | 14 November 1997 (age 28) | Torpedo Moscow | 2020 | | 59 | 3 |
| 97 | Konstantin Nizhegorodov | (Russia) | DF | 21 June 2002 (age 24) | Hansa Rostock | 2021 | | 3 | 0 |
Midfielders
| 7 | Soltmurad Bakayev | (Russia) | MF | 5 August 1999 (age 27) | Spartak Moscow | 2020 | 2024 | 73 | 5 |
| 8 | Aleksandr Lomovitsky | (Russia) | MF | 27 January 1998 (age 28) | Spartak Moscow | 2021 | 2026 | 13 | 1 |
| 18 | Marat Apshatsev | (Russia) | MF | 27 May 2001 (age 25) | Tom Tomsk | 2021 | 2026 | 10 | 0 |
| 28 | Oliver Abildgaard | (Denmark) | MF | 10 June 1996 (age 30) | AaB | 2020 | 2024 | 62 | 1 |
| 38 | Leon Musayev | (Russia) | MF | 25 January 1999 (age 27) | Zenit St.Petersburg | 2021 | | 30 | 0 |
| 56 | Lenar Fattakhov | (Russia) | MF | 12 May 2003 (age 23) | Academy | 2021 | | 5 | 0 |
| 84 | Stepan Surikov | (Russia) | MF | 30 January 2002 (age 24) | Academy | 2021 | | 1 | 0 |
| 98 | Konstantin Kuchayev | (Russia) | MF | 18 March 1998 (age 28) | CSKA Moscow | 2021 | 2022 | 10 | 1 |
Forwards
| 10 | German Onugkha | (Russia) | FW | 6 July 1996 (age 30) | loan from Vejle | 2021 | 2022 | 25 | 3 |
| 13 | Kirill Klimov | (Russia) | FW | 30 January 2001 (age 25) | Academy | 2020 | | 5 | 0 |
| 14 | Mikhail Kostyukov | (Russia) | FW | 9 August 1991 (age 35) | Tambov | 2021 | | 23 | 2 |
| 44 | Vitaly Lisakovich | (Belarus) | FW | 8 February 1998 (age 28) | Lokomotiv Moscow | 2022 | 2025 | 12 | 6 |
| 85 | Daniil Kuznetsov | (Russia) | FW | 23 April 2003 (age 23) | Zenit St.Petersburg | 2022 | 2026 | 9 | 0 |
Contracts suspended
| 4 | Silvije Begić | (Croatia) | DF | 3 June 1993 (age 33) | Orenburg | 2019 | 2023 | 32 | 1 |
| 5 | Filip Uremović | (Croatia) | DF | 11 February 1997 (age 29) | Olimpija Ljubljana | 2018 | | 97 | 1 |
| 6 | Hwang In-beom | (South Korea) | MF | 20 September 1996 (age 30) | Vancouver Whitecaps | 2020 | 2023 | 38 | 6 |
| 11 | Anders Dreyer | (Denmark) | MF | 2 May 1998 (age 28) | Midtjylland | 2021 | 2026 | 14 | 8 |
| 21 | Khvicha Kvaratskhelia | (Georgia (country)) | MF | 12 February 2001 (age 25) | Rustavi | 2019 | 2024 | 73 | 9 |
| 99 | Sead Hakšabanović | (Montenegro) | FW | 4 May 1999 (age 27) | IFK Norrköping | 2021 | 2026 | 23 | 1 |
Away on loan
| 19 | Ivan Ignatyev | (Russia) | FW | 6 January 1999 (age 27) | Krasnodar | 2020 | 2024 | 40 | 3 |
| 27 | Aleksei Gritsayenko | (Russia) | DF | 25 May 1995 (age 31) | Tambov | 2021 | | 0 | 0 |
| | Arseni Vertkov | (Russia) | GK | 21 September 2002 (age 24) | Academy | 2020 | | 0 | 0 |
| | Nikita Yanovich | (Russia) | GK | 28 March 2003 (age 23) | Academy | 2021 | | 0 | 0 |
| | Viktor Aleksandrov | (Russia) | DF | 14 February 2002 (age 24) | Academy | 2020 | | 0 | 0 |
| | Igor Konovalov | (Russia) | MF | 8 July 1996 (age 30) | Kuban Krasnodar | 2018 | | 72 | 3 |
| | Aleksey Zakharov | (Russia) | MF | 5 November 2003 (age 23) | Academy | 2021 | | 0 | 0 |
| | Darko Jevtić | (Switzerland) | MF | 8 February 1993 (age 33) | Lech Poznań | 2020 | 2023 | 45 | 4 |
| | Kirill Kosarev | (Russia) | FW | 1 August 2001 (age 25) | Murom | 2020 | | 4 | 0 |
Players that left Rubin Kazan during the season
| 3 | Mikhail Merkulov | (Russia) | DF | 26 January 1994 (age 32) | Ural Yekaterinburg | 2020 | 2022 | 9 | 0 |
| 8 | Oleg Shatov | (Russia) | MF | 29 July 1990 (age 36) | Zenit St.Petersburg | 2020 | 2022 | 25 | 1 |
| 9 | Đorđe Despotović | (Serbia) | FW | 4 March 1992 (age 34) | Orenburg | 2020 | 2023 | 36 | 15 |
| 16 | Mitsuki Saito | (Japan) | MF | 10 January 1999 (age 27) | loan from Shonan Bellmare | 2020 | 2022 | 3 | 0 |
| 25 | Denis Makarov | (Russia) | MF | 18 February 1998 (age 28) | Neftekhimik Nizhnekamsk | 2020 | 2023 | 40 | 11 |
| 75 | Ivan Konovalov | (Russia) | GK | 18 August 1994 (age 32) | Torpedo-BelAZ Zhodino | 2018 | 2022 | 22 | 0 |
| 93 | Aleksei Gorodovoy | (Russia) | GK | 10 August 1993 (age 33) | Kongsvinger | 2019 | | 0 | 0 |
| | Danil Stepanov | (Russia) | DF | 25 January 2000 (age 26) | Academy | 2018 | | 20 | 0 |

=== Contract suspensions ===
Note: Flags indicate national team as defined under FIFA eligibility rules; some limited exceptions apply. Players may hold more than one non-FIFA nationality.

| No. | Pos. | Nation | Player |
|---|---|---|---|
| — | DF | CRO | Silvije Begić |
| — | DF | CRO | Filip Uremović (at Sheffield United) |
| — | MF | DEN | Anders Dreyer (at Midtjylland) |

| No. | Pos. | Nation | Player |
|---|---|---|---|
| — | MF | GEO | Khvicha Kvaratskhelia (at Dinamo Batumi) |
| — | MF | KOR | Hwang In-beom (at Seoul) |
| — | MF | MNE | Sead Hakšabanović (at Djurgården) |

=== On loan ===
Note: Flags indicate national team as defined under FIFA eligibility rules; some limited exceptions apply. Players may hold more than one non-FIFA nationality.

| No. | Pos. | Nation | Player |
|---|---|---|---|
| — | GK | RUS | Arseni Vertkov (at Peresvet Podolsk) |
| — | GK | RUS | Nikita Yanovich (at Dynamo Stavropol) |
| — | DF | RUS | Viktor Aleksandrov (at Nizhny Novgorod) |
| — | DF | RUS | Aleksei Gritsayenko (at Kuban Krasnodar) |
| — | MF | RUS | Igor Konovalov (at Akhmat Grozny) |

| No. | Pos. | Nation | Player |
|---|---|---|---|
| — | MF | RUS | Aleksey Zakharov (at Volna Nizhny Novgorod Oblast) |
| — | MF | SUI | Darko Jevtić (at AEK Athens) |
| — | FW | RUS | Ivan Ignatyev (at Krylia Sovetov) |
| — | FW | RUS | Kirill Kosarev (at Hrvatski Dragovoljac) |

== Transfers ==
=== In ===
| Date | Position | Nationality | Name | From | Fee | Ref. |
|---|---|---|---|---|---|---|
| 27 May 2021 | FW | (Montenegro) | Sead Hakšabanović | IFK Norrköping | Undisclosed | |
| 11 June 2021 | DF | (Russia) | Konstantin Nizhegorodov | Hansa Rostock | Undisclosed | |
| 30 June 2020 | DF | (Russia) | Vladislav Ignatyev | Lokomotiv Moscow | Undisclosed | |
| 30 June 2021 | DF | (Russia) | Ivan Savitskiy | Leningradets Leningrad Oblast | Undisclosed | |
| 9 August 2021 | DF | (Tunisia) | Montassar Talbi | Benevento | Undisclosed | |
| 28 August 2021 | MF | (Denmark) | Anders Dreyer | Midtjylland | Undisclosed | |
| 13 December 2021 | MF | (Russia) | Marat Apshatsev | Tom Tomsk | Undisclosed | |
| 29 December 2021 | MF | (Russia) | Aleksandr Lomovitsky | Spartak Moscow | Undisclosed | |
| 21 January 2022 | FW | (Belarus) | Vitaly Lisakovich | Lokomotiv Moscow | Undisclosed | |
| 17 February 2022 | DF | (Russia) | Yegor Teslenko | KAMAZ Naberezhnye Chelny | Undisclosed | |
| 20 February 2022 | FW | (Russia) | Daniil Kuznetsov | Zenit St. Petersburg | Undisclosed | |

=== Loans in ===
| Date from | Position | Nationality | Name | From | Date to | Ref. |
|---|---|---|---|---|---|---|
| 14 December 2020 | MF | (Japan) | Mitsuki Saito | Shonan Bellmare | 7 January 2022 | |
| 1 September 2021 | FW | (Russia) | German Onugkha | Vejle | 30 June 2022 | |
| 26 January 2022 | MF | (Russia) | Konstantin Kuchayev | CSKA Moscow | End of season | |

=== Out ===
| Date | Position | Nationality | Name | To | Fee | Ref. |
|---|---|---|---|---|---|---|
| 2 June 2021 | DF | (Russia) | Ilya Agapov | Spartak Moscow | Undisclosed | |
| 17 June 2021 | DF | (Russia) | Vladislav Mikushin | Yenisey Krasnoyarsk | Undisclosed | |
| 21 July 2021 | DF | (Sweden) | Carl Starfelt | Celtic | Undisclosed | |
| 28 July 2021 | DF | (Russia) | Mikhail Merkulov | Rijeka | Undisclosed | |
| 6 August 2021 | MF | (Russia) | Denis Makarov | Dynamo Moscow | Undisclosed | |
| 7 December 2021 | GK | (Russia) | Aleksei Gorodovoy | Fakel Voronezh | Undisclosed | |
| 29 December 2021 | DF | (Russia) | Danil Stepanov | Arsenal Tula | Undisclosed | |
| 18 January 2022 | GK | (Russia) | Ivan Konovalov | Livingston | Undisclosed | |

=== Loans out ===
| Date from | Position | Nationality | Name | To | Date to | Ref. |
|---|---|---|---|---|---|---|
| 14 June 2021 | DF | (Russia) | Danil Stepanov | Arsenal Tula | 29 December 2021 | |
| 8 July 2021 | FW | (Russia) | Kirill Klimov | Kuban Krasnodar | 22 December 2021 | |
| 12 July 2021 | MF | (Russia) | Igor Konovalov | Akhmat Grozny | End of season | |
| 17 July 2021 | GK | (Russia) | Arseni Vertkov | Peresvet Podolsk | End of season | |
| 28 July 2021 | DF | (Russia) | Kirill Kosarev | Hrvatski Dragovoljac | 20 August 2021 | |
| 20 August 2021 | DF | (Russia) | Kirill Kosarev | Nizhny Novgorod | 31 December 2021 | |
| 31 August 2021 | MF | (Switzerland) | Darko Jevtić | AEK Athens | End of season | |
| 3 September 2021 | DF | (Croatia) | Silvije Begić | Krylia Sovetov | 2 February 2022 | |
| 2 February 2022 | FW | (Russia) | Ivan Ignatyev | Krylia Sovetov | End of season | |
| 15 February 2022 | DF | (Russia) | Viktor Aleksandrov | Nizhny Novgorod | End of season | |

=== Contract suspensions ===
| Date | Position | Nationality | Name | Joined | Date | Ref. |
|---|---|---|---|---|---|---|
| 15 March 2022 | MF | (Montenegro) | Sead Hakšabanović | Djurgården | 30 June 2022 | |
| 16 March 2022 | MF | (Denmark) | Anders Dreyer | Midtjylland | 30 June 2022 | |
| 24 March 2022 | DF | (Croatia) | Filip Uremović | Sheffield United | 30 June 2022 | |
| 24 March 2022 | MF | (Georgia (country)) | Khvicha Kvaratskhelia | Dinamo Batumi | 30 June 2022 | |
| 26 March 2022 | DF | (Croatia) | Silvije Begić | | | |
| 3 April 2022 | MF | (South Korea) | Hwang In-beom | Seoul | June 2022 | |

=== Released ===
| Date | Position | Nationality | Name | Joined | Date | Ref. |
|---|---|---|---|---|---|---|
| 16 July 2021 | MF | (Georgia (country)) | Zuriko Davitashvili | Arsenal Tula | 20 July 2021 | |
| 18 November 2021 | MF | (Russia) | Oleg Shatov | Ural Yekaterinburg | 1 February 2022 | |
| 30 January 2022 | FW | (Serbia) | Đorđe Despotović | Arsenal Tula | 2 February 2022 | |

== Friendlies ==
| 24 June 2021 | Rubin Kazan | 2–1 | Nizhny Novgorod | Austria |
| 12:30 MSK (UTC+3) | Kosarev 52', 59' | Report | Galadzhan 72' |

| 27 June 2021 | Ural Yekaterinburg | 2–0 | Rubin Kazan | Austria |
| 16:00 MSK (UTC+3) | Yegorychev 19', 34' | Report |
Note: Match consisted of three 45 minute periods.

| 2 July 2021 | Nizhny Novgorod | 0–3 | Rubin Kazan | Austria |
| 16:00 MSK (UTC+3) | | Report | Kvaratskhelia 32'; I.Ignatyev 75', 85' |

| 5 July 2021 | Rubin Kazan | 3–1 | Ural Yekaterinburg | Austria |
| 17:00 MSK (UTC+3) | Hwang 26'; Despotović 57'; Shatov 89'; V.Ignatyev (yellow card) 130' | Report | Gerasimov 9'; Kolesnichenko (yellow card) 13' |
Note: Match consisted of three 45 minute periods.

| 10 July 2021 | Rubin Kazan | 1–0 | Khimki | Austria |
| 18:00 MSK (UTC+3) | Kvaratskhelia 90' | Report |

| 14 July 2021 | Rubin Kazan | 0–4 | Spartak Moscow | Moscow |
| 22:00 MSK (UTC+3) | | Report | Moses 10'; Sobolev 56'; Zobnin 59'; Dzhikiya 63' | Stadium: Otkrytiye Arena |

| 17 July 2021 | Rubin Kazan | 1–3 | Sochi | Khimki |
| 17:00 MSK (UTC+3) | Hakšabanović 90' | Report | Prokhin 48'; Barsov 50'; Tsallagov (red card) 59'; Popov 88' | Stadium: Arena Khimki |

| 6 September 2021 | Rubin Kazan | 1–3 | Krasnodar |
| 17:00 MSK (UTC+3) | Bakayev 67' | Report | Córdoba 1'; Ilyin 74', 76' |

| 9 October 2021 | Krasnodar | 2–1 | Rubin Kazan |
| 16:00 MSK (UTC+3) | Córdoba 56'; Ilyin 63' | Report | I.Ignatyev 44' |

| 20 January 2022 | Rubin Kazan | 4–4 | Fakel Voronezh |
| 15:00 MSK (UTC+3) | Uremović (yellow card) 26'; Onugkha 30', 66'; Teslenko 41'; Zuyev 45'; Fattakhov (yellow card) 69' | Report | Akbashev (yellow card) 14'; Pejčinović (yellow card) 37'; Razborov 41'; Maksimov 42'; Dmitriyev (yellow card) 57' (penalty missed) 77' 82'; Bryzgalov 74'; Smirnov (yellow card) 79' |

| 23 January 2022 | Rubin Kazan (Russia) | 0–0 | (Poland) Wisła Płock |
| 10:00 MSK (UTC+3) | | Report |

| 5 February 2022 | khimki | 0–0 | Rubin Kazan |
| 15:00 MSK (UTC+3) | | Report |

| 8 February 2022 | Rubin Kazan (Russia) | 2–2 | (Georgia (country)) Dinamo Batumi |
| 11:30 MSK (UTC+3) | Onugkha 65' (pen.); Klimov 67' | Report | Jighauri 60', 88' |

| 14 February 2022 | Rubin Kazan | 5–0 | Krylia Sovetov |
| 15:00 MSK (UTC+3) | Dreyer 19', 43', 53' (penalty missed) 43'; Hwang 56'; Zotov 75' | Report |

| 17 February 2022 | Dynamo Moscow | 2–2 | Rubin Kazan |
| 15:00 MSK (UTC+3) | Zakharyan 40'; Fomin 48' | Report | Talbi 45'; Kvaratskhelia 70' |

| 20 February 2022 | CSKA Moscow | 1–1 | Rubin Kazan |
| 15:00 MSK (UTC+3) | Carrascal (yellow card) 6' (red card) 33'; Diveyev 17'; Oblyakov (yellow card) 28' | Report | Uremović (yellow card) 15'; Hakšabanović 88' |

| 21 February 2022 | Rubin Kazan (Russia) | 2–0 | (Kazakhstan) Tobol |
| 17:00 MSK (UTC+3) | Onugkha 39'; 83' (o.g.) | Report |

| 26 March 2022 | Rubin Kazan | 0–5 | Krylia Sovetov | Kazan |
| 14:00 MSK (UTC+3) | | Report |

== Competitions ==
=== Overall record ===
| Competition | First match | Last match | Starting round | Final position | Record | | | | | | | |
| Competition | First match | Last match | Starting round | Final position | Pld | W | D | L | GF | GA | GD | Win % |
|---|---|---|---|---|---|---|---|---|---|---|---|---|
| Premier League | 24 July 2021 | 21 May 2022 | Matchday 1 | 15th | 30 | 8 | 5 | 17 | 34 | 56 | −22 | 26.67 |
| Russian Cup | 3 March 2022 | 20 April 2022 | Round of 16 | Quarterfinal | 2 | 1 | 0 | 1 | 3 | 4 | −1 | 50.00 |
| UEFA Europa Conference League | 5 August 2021 | 12 August 2021 | Third qualifying round | Third qualifying round | 2 | 0 | 1 | 1 | 0 | 1 | −1 | 0.00 |
| Total | | | | | 34 | 9 | 6 | 19 | 37 | 61 | −24 | 26.47 |

Last updated: 21 May 2022
Source: Soccerway

=== Premier League ===
==== League table ====
| Pos | Team | Pld | W | D | L | GF | GA | GD | Pts | Qualification or relegation |
|---|---|---|---|---|---|---|---|---|---|---|
| 12 | Ural Yekaterinburg | 30 | 8 | 9 | 13 | 27 | 35 | −8 | 33 (Note: Head-to-head points: Nizhny Novgorod 4, Ural Yekaterinburg 1.) | |
| 13 | Khimki (O) | 30 | 7 | 11 | 12 | 34 | 47 | −13 | 32 | Qualification for the relegation play-offs |
| 14 | Ufa (R) | 30 | 6 | 12 | 12 | 29 | 40 | −11 | 30 | Qualification for the relegation play-offs |
| 15 | Rubin Kazan (R) | 30 | 8 | 5 | 17 | 34 | 56 | −22 | 29 | Relegation to First League |
| 16 | Arsenal Tula (R) | 30 | 5 | 8 | 17 | 30 | 59 | −29 | 23 | Relegation to First League |

Source: Premier Liga
Rules for classification: 1) Points; 2) Head-to-head points; 3) Head-to-head matches won; 4) Head-to-head goal difference; 5) Head-to-head goals scored; 6) Matches won; 7) Goal difference; 8) Goals scored; 9) 2020–21 position (not applicable to final standings); 10) Play-off.
(O) Play-off winners; (R) Relegated

==== Results summary ====
| Overall | | | | | | | | Home | | | | | | Away | | | | | |
| Pld | W | D | L | GF | GA | GD | Pts | W | D | L | GF | GA | GD | W | D | L | GF | GA | GD |
|---|---|---|---|---|---|---|---|---|---|---|---|---|---|---|---|---|---|---|---|
| 30 | 8 | 5 | 17 | 34 | 56 | −22 | 29 | 5 | 2 | 8 | 19 | 25 | −6 | 3 | 3 | 9 | 15 | 31 | −16 |

Last updated: 21 May 2022.
Source: FBref

==== Results by round ====
| Round | 1 | 2 | 3 | 4 | 5 | 6 | 7 | 8 | 9 | 10 | 11 | 12 | 13 | 14 | 15 | 16 | 17 | 18 | 19 | 20 | 21 | 22 | 23 | 24 | 25 | 26 | 27 | 28 | 29 | 30 |
|---|---|---|---|---|---|---|---|---|---|---|---|---|---|---|---|---|---|---|---|---|---|---|---|---|---|---|---|---|---|---|
| Ground | H | A | H | H | A | A | H | H | A | H | H | A | Н | A | А | H | А | A | A | A | H | A | H | H | A | H | A | A | A | H |
| Result | W | W | W | D | D | L | W | L | L | L | D | D | W | L | W | L | L | L | L | W | L | L | L | L | D | W | L | L | L | L |
| Position | 8 | 2 | 2 | 2 | 4 | 5 | 4 | 5 | 7 | 9 | 9 | 9 | 8 | 8 | 8 | 9 | 10 | 10 | 11 | 10 | 10 | 10 | 11 | 12 | 12 | 11 | 13 | 13 | 14 | 15 |

Updated to match(es) played on 21 May 2022. Source: Premier Liga
A = Away; H = Home; W = Win; D = Draw; L = Loss

==== Matches ====
| 24 July 2021 1 | Rubin Kazan | 1 – 0 | Spartak Moscow | Kazan |
| 20:00 MSK (UTC+3) | Uremović (yellow card) 18'; Abildgaard (yellow card) 37'; Despotović (yellow card) 42'; Samoshnikov 49'; Zuyev (yellow card) 66'; Kvaratskhelia (yellow card) 68'; Shatov (yellow card) 70' | Report | Gigot (yellow card) 18'; Rasskazov (yellow card) 79'; Sobolev (yellow card) 88'; Mirzov (yellow card) 90' | Stadium: Ak Bars Arena; Attendance: 14,409; Referee: Vladislav Bezborodov |

| 30 July 2021 2 | Arsenal Tula | 0 – 3 | Rubin Kazan | Tula |
| 19:00 MSK (UTC+3) | Kostadinov (yellow card) 33'; Smolnikov (yellow card) 53' | Report | Hwang 12'; Begić (yellow card) 24'; Despotović 37' (pen.); Kvaratskhelia 40'; Bakayev (yellow card) 70' | Stadium: Arsenal Stadium; Attendance: 996; Referee: Sergey Ivanov |

| 8 August 2021 3 | Rubin Kazan | 2 – 1 | Akhmat Grozny | Kazan |
| 20:00 MSK (UTC+3) | Zotov (yellow card) 6'; Uremović (yellow card) 21'; Jevtić (yellow card) 33'; Hakšabanović 58'; Iancu 86' (o.g.); Begić (yellow card) 90+' | Report | Bystrov (yellow card) 9'; Utkin 31'; Konaté (yellow card) 44'; Lystsov (yellow card) 51'; Sheliya (red card) 53'; Nižić (yellow card) 76' | Stadium: Ak Bars Arena; Attendance: 8,147; Referee: Pavel Kukuyan |

| 15 August 2021 4 | Rubin Kazan | 1 – 1 | Krylia Sovetov | Kazan |
| 20:00 MSK (UTC+3) | Samoshnikov (yellow card) 40'; Hwang 63' (yellow card) 90'; Abildgaard (yellow card) 77'; Begić (yellow card) 77' | Report | Sergeyev 59'; Lomayev (yellow card) 63' | Stadium: Ak Bars Arena; Attendance: 10,488; Referee: Alexey Sukhoi |

| 22 August 2021 5 | Khimki | 1 – 1 | Rubin Kazan | Khimki |
| 20:00 MSK (UTC+3) | Glushakov 16'; Sebai (yellow card) 84'; Tikhy (yellow card) 90+1' | Report | Jevtić 30'; Zotov (yellow card) 33'; Uremović (yellow card) 77' | Stadium: Arena Khimki; Attendance: 620; Referee: Vasily Kazartsev |

| 27 August 2021 6 | Krasnodar | 2 – 0 | Rubin Kazan | Krasnodar |
| 20:30 MSK (UTC+3) | Claesson (yellow card) 1'; Ionov 12'; Córdoba 35'; Gazinsky (yellow card) 60' | Report | Zotov (yellow card) 7'; Samoshnikov (yellow card) 8' | Stadium: Krasnodar Stadium; Attendance: 491; Referee: Evgeny Kukulyak |

| 12 September 2021 7 | Rubin Kazan | 4 – 0 | Ural Yekaterinburg | Kazan |
| 18:30 MSK (UTC+3) | Dreyer 2', 80', 90+'; Mamin 13' (o.g.); Hwang (yellow card) 19'; Hakšabanović (yellow card) 52'; Abildgaard (yellow card) 55'; Onugkha (yellow card) 87' | Report | Gadzhimuradov (yellow card) 36' | Stadium: Central Stadium; Attendance: 6,077; Referee: Vladimir Moskalyov |

| 20 September 2021 8 | Rubin Kazan | 1 – 3 | Zenit St.Petersburg | Kazan |
| 18:30 MSK (UTC+3) | Nizhegorodov (yellow card) 50'; Chistyakov 67' (o.g.); Hwang (yellow card) 76'; Zotov (yellow card) 90+2' | Report | Dzyuba 24', 43'; Claudinho 29'; Rakitskyi (yellow card) 67' | Stadium: Ak Bars Arena; Attendance: 7,480; Referee: Sergey Ivanov |

| 26 September 2021 9 | Dynamo Moscow | 2 – 0 | Rubin Kazan | Moscow |
| 14:00 MSK (UTC+3) | Fomin 32'; Grulyov 59'; Szymański (yellow card) 68'; Varela (yellow card) 73'; Igboun (yellow card) 89' | Report | Kostyukov (yellow card) 21'; Despotović (yellow card) 40'; Abildgaard (yellow card) 52'; Kvaratskhelia (yellow card) 64'; Uremović (yellow card) 86'; Bakayev (yellow card) 88' | Stadium: VTB Arena; Attendance: 7,101; Referee: Alexey Sukhoi |

| 2 October 2021 10 | Rubin Kazan | 0 – 1 | Nizhny Novgorod | Kazan |
| 14:00 MSK (UTC+3) | Kvaratskhelia (penalty missed) 49' | Report | Kozlov (yellow card) 35'; Kalinsky 61' (pen.) | Stadium: Ak Bars Arena; Attendance: 3,986; Referee: Sergei Karasev |

| 16 October 2021 11 | Rubin Kazan | 2 – 2 | Lokomotiv Moscow | Kazan |
| 16:30 MSK (UTC+3) | Dreyer 36'; Talbi (yellow card) 39'; Onugkha 66'; Samoshnikov (yellow card) 75' | Report | Beka Beka (yellow card) 8'; Petrov (yellow card) 21'; Smolov 68'; Maradishvili (yellow card) 90+'; Zhemaletdinov 90+' | Stadium: Ak Bars Arena; Attendance: 4,511; Referee: Kirill Levnikov |

| 24 October 2021 12 | Ufa | 1 – 1 | Rubin Kazan | Ufa |
| 14:00 MSK (UTC+3) | Agalarov 19' (pen.); Urunov (yellow card) 29'; Cacintura (yellow card) 47'; Aliyev (yellow card) 90+'; Pliyev (yellow card) 90+' | Report | Abildgaard (yellow card) 12'; Zhuravlyov 59' (o.g.) | Stadium: BetBoom Arena; Attendance: 454; Referee: Igor Panin |

| 30 October 2021 13 | Rubin Kazan | 1 – 0 | CSKA Moscow | Kazan |
| 14:00 MSK (UTC+3) | Kvaratskhelia (yellow card) 37'; Kostyukov 90+1'; Dyupin (yellow card) 90+5' | Report | Mukhin (yellow card) 29'; Zabolotny (yellow card) 54'; Zaynutdinov (yellow card) 67'; Nababkin (yellow card) 86' | Stadium: Ak Bars Arena; Attendance: 5,203; Referee: Vladislav Bezborodov |

| 7 November 2021 14 | Rostov | 5 – 1 | Rubin Kazan | Rostov-on-Don |
| 16:30 MSK (UTC+3) | Bayramyan 42'; Poyarkov (yellow card) 43'; Poloz 50'; Almqvist 55'; Bastos (yellow card) 58'; Sowe 65'; Glebov 82' | Report | Bakayev (yellow card) 20' (goal) 35'; Uremović (yellow card) 56'; Kvaratskhelia (yellow card) 56' | Stadium: Rostov Arena; Attendance: 6,034; Referee: Pavel Shadykhanov |

| 21 November 2021 15 | Sochi | 1 – 2 | Rubin Kazan | Sochi |
| 19:30 MSK (UTC+3) | Zaika (yellow card) 22'; Rodrigão 27'; Yurganov (red card) 59' | Report | Abildgaard (yellow card) 24' (yellow-red card) 61' (goal) 31'; Zuyev (yellow card) 26'; Onugkha (yellow card) 78'; Dreyer 81'; Ignatyev (yellow card) 84' | Stadium: Fisht Olympic Stadium; Attendance: 3,731; Referee: Alexey Matyunin |

| 28 November 2021 16 | Rubin Kazan | 2 – 3 | Dynamo Moscow | Kazan |
| 16:30 MSK (UTC+3) | Bakayev 30'; Dreyer 49' (pen.); Onugkha (yellow card) 59'; Zotov (yellow card) 65'; Musayev (yellow card) 88' | Report | Makarov 18'; Grulyov (yellow card) 44'; Varela (yellow card) 49'; Moro (penalty missed) 66'; Balbuena 68'; Skopintsev (yellow card) 78'; Szymański (yellow card) 85' | Stadium: Ak Bars Arena; Attendance: 3,526; Referee: Kirill Levnikov |

| 5 December 2021 17 | Nizhny Novgorod | 2 – 1 | Rubin Kazan | Nizhny Novgorod |
| 16:30 MSK (UTC+3) | Kalinsky 2' (pen.), 42'; Tkachuk (yellow card) 78' | Report | Dreyer 28'; Zotov (yellow card) 40'; Kvaratskhelia (yellow card) 51'; Hwang (yellow card) 78' | Stadium: Nizhny Novgorod Stadium; Attendance: 1,789; Referee: Artyom Chistyakov |

| 11 December 2021 18 | Krylia Sovetov | 2 – 0 | Rubin Kazan | Samara |
| 14:00 MSK (UTC+3) | Sergeyev 62'; Pinyayev 85' | Report | Zuyev (yellow card) 56' | Stadium: Solidarnost Arena; Attendance: 4,598; Referee: Alexey Sukhoi |

| 28 February 2022 19 | Zenit St.Petersburg | 3 – 2 | Rubin Kazan | Saint Petersburg |
| 19:00 MSK (UTC+3) | Barrios (yellow card) 31'; Alberto 48'; Sutormin 55' (pen.); Sergeyev 90+2' | Report | Musayev (yellow card) 17' (yellow-red card) 78'; Lomovitsky (yellow card) 54'; Lisakovich 61', 67' | Stadium: Krestovsky Stadium; Attendance: 16,668; Referee: Evgeny Kukulyak^{ru} |

| 7 March 2022 20 | Akhmat Grozny | 1 – 2 | Rubin Kazan | Grozny |
| 19:00 MSK (UTC+3) | Utkin 3'; Timofeyev (yellow card) 21'; Sebai (yellow card) 63'; Arkhipov (yellow card) 88' | Report | Samoshnikov (yellow card) 43'; Lisakovich 50'; Uremović (yellow card) 51'; Begić (yellow card) 85'; Dreyer 90+1' | Stadium: Akhmat-Arena; Attendance: 6,722; Referee: Vladimir Moskalyov |

| 14 March 2022 21 | Rubin Kazan | 1 – 2 | Rostov | Kazan |
| 19:00 MSK (UTC+3) | Lisakovich (red card) 18'; Zuyev (yellow card) 54'; Kvaratskhelia 77' (yellow card) 90+'; Begić (yellow card) 80' | Report | Poloz 12'; Silyanov (yellow card) 57'; Begić 75' (o.g.); Golenkov (yellow card) 76'; Folmer (red card) 90+' | Stadium: Ak Bars Arena; Attendance: 3,344; Referee: Vitali Meshkov |

| 20 March 2022 22 | CSKA Moscow | 6 – 1 | Rubin Kazan | Moscow |
| 14:00 MSK (UTC+3) | Yazıcı 5', 67', 86' (pen.); Gbamin 11'; Shchennikov (yellow card) 15'; Medina 24'; Carrascal 26'; Oblyakov (yellow card) 34'; Zaynutdinov (yellow card) 58' | Report | Lomovitsky (yellow card) 21' (yellow-red card) 44'; Begić (yellow card) 26' (yellow-red card) 85'; Kuchayev 38'; Fattakhov (yellow card) 78' | Stadium: VEB Arena; Attendance: 12,042; Referee: Kirill Levnikov |

| 1 April 2022 23 | Rubin Kazan | 2 – 3 | Khimki | Kazan |
| 19:00 MSK (UTC+3) | Zuyev (yellow card) 53'; Onugkha 56'; Samoshnikov (yellow card) 79'; Tikhy 84' (o.g.) | Report | Glushakov 60'; Kukharchuk 62'; Bozhenov (yellow card) 77'; Lantratov (yellow card) 82'; Volkov 90'; Magomedov (yellow card) 90+' | Stadium: Ak Bars Arena; Attendance: 4,284; Referee: Vladislav Bezborodov |

| 9 April 2022 24 | Rubin Kazan | 0 – 1 | Krasnodar | Kazan |
| 16:30 MSK (UTC+3) | | Report | Chernikov (yellow card) 51' (yellow-red card) 90+'; Volkov 85'; Gazinsky (yellow card) 89' | Stadium: Ak Bars Arena; Attendance: 6,488; Referee: Vladimir Moskalyov |

| 16 April 2022 25 | Spartak Moscow | 1 – 1 | Rubin Kazan | Moscow |
| 19:00 MSK (UTC+3) | Khlusevich (yellow card) 41'; Bakayev (yellow card) 53'; Sobolev 69' | Report | Lomovitsky (yellow card) 10'; Ignatyev 30' | Stadium: Otkritie Arena; Attendance: 7,351; Referee: Pavel Kukuyan |

| 24 April 2022 26 | Rubin Kazan | 1 – 0 | Arsenal Tula | Kazan |
| 14:00 MSK (UTC+3) | Lomovitsky 22' | Report | Kaynov (yellow card) 50' | Stadium: Ak Bars Arena; Attendance: 4,773; Referee: Artyom Chistyakov |

| 30 April 2022 27 | Rubin Kazan | 0 – 6 | Sochi | Kazan |
| 14:00 MSK (UTC+3) | | Report | Margasov 26'; Joãozinho 42'; Cassierra 52'; Makarchuk (yellow card) 77'; Zaika 82'; Popov 84'; Melkadze 90+' | Stadium: Ak Bars Arena; Attendance: 5,180; Referee: Jan Bobrovsky |

| 8 May 2022 28 | Lokomotiv Moscow | 1 – 0 | Rubin Kazan | Moscow |
| 19:00 MSK (UTC+3) | Tiknizyan (yellow card) 43'; Miranchuk (yellow card) 84' (goal) 87' (pen.); Mampassi (yellow card) 90+' | Report | Zuyev (yellow card) 75'; Ignatyev (yellow card) 86' | Stadium: RZD Arena; Attendance: 11,822; Referee: Kirill Levnikov |

| 15 May 2022 29 | Ural Yekaterinburg | 3 – 0 | Rubin Kazan | Yekaterinburg |
| 14:00 MSK (UTC+3) | Bicfalvi 22', 71'; Shatov 56' | Report | Kuchayev (yellow card) 24'; Kuznetsov (yellow card) 65'; Samoshnikov (yellow card) 76' | Stadium: Central Stadium; Attendance: 14,287; Referee: Sergei Karasev |

| 21 May 2022 30 | Rubin Kazan | 1 – 2 | Ufa | Kazan |
| 17:00 MSK (UTC+3) | Lisakovich 37' (penalty missed) 90+ Kuchayev (yellow card) 81'; Teslenko (yellow card) 85' | Report | Jokić (yellow card) 36'; Kamilov 54'; Ivanov (yellow card) 68'; Agalarov (yellow card) 84'; Ortiz 90' | Stadium: Ak Bars Arena; Attendance: 25,142; Referee: Sergey Ivanov |

=== Russian Cup ===
| 3 March 2022 Round of 16 | Rubin Kazan | 2 – 1 | Rotor Volgograd | Kazan |
| 19:00 MSK (UTC+3) | Lisakovich 28' (pen.), 73' (pen.); Musaev (yellow card) 41'; Lomovitsky (yellow card) 53'; Kvaratskhelia (yellow card) 67' | Report | Minayev 12'; Tashayev (yellow card) 36'; Obukhov (yellow card) 43'; Chukanov (yellow card) 52'; Mullin (yellow card) 75'; Makhatadze (yellow card) 78' | Stadium: Ak Bars Arena; Referee: Alexey Matyunin |

| 20 April 2022 Quarterfinal | Yenisey Krasnoyarsk | 3 – 1 | Rubin Kazan | Krasnoyarsk |
| 14:30 MSK (UTC+3) | Okladnikov 12', 32'; Glushkov 39'; Kichin (yellow card) 55' | Report | Kuznetsov (yellow card) 60'; Musayev (yellow card) 63'; Onugkha 86' | Stadium: Central Stadium; Referee: Pavel Shadykhanov |

=== UEFA Europa Conference League ===
==== Third qualifying round ====
| 5 August 2021 First leg | Raków Częstochowa (Poland) | 0–0 | (Russia) Rubin Kazan | Bielsko-Biała, Poland |
| 22:00 MSK (UTC+3) | Niewulis (yellow card) 43'; Papanikolaou (yellow card) 58'; Arsenić (yellow card) 78'; Kun (yellow card) 83' | Report | Kostyukov (yellow card) 90+2' | Stadium: BBOSiR Stadium; Attendance: 4,811; Referee: João Pinheiro (Portugal) |
Note: Match played at the BBOSiR Stadium in Bielsko-Biała, instead of Raków Częstochowa's regular Miejski Stadion Piłkarski "Raków" in Częstochowa due to it not meeting UEFA requirements.

| 12 August 2021 Second leg | Rubin Kazan (Russia) | 0–1 (a.e.t.) (0–1 agg.) | (Poland) Raków Częstochowa | Kazan, Russia |
| 19:00 MSK (UTC+3) | Kostyukov (yellow card) 38'; Musayev (yellow card) 63'; Samoshnikov (yellow card) 105' (yellow-red card) 106'; Saito (yellow card) 108' | Report | Mateusz Wdowiak; Niewulis (yellow card) 86'; Gutkovskis 111'; Wydra (yellow card) 120' | Stadium: Ak Bars Arena; Attendance: 11,754; Referee: Tamás Bognár (Hungary) |

== Squad statistics ==
As of match played 21 May 2022

=== Appearances and goals ===
| No. | Pos | Nat | Player | Total | | Premier League | | Russian Cup | | UEFA Europa Conference League | |
| No. | Pos | Nat | Player | Apps | Goals | Apps | Goals | Apps | Goals | Apps | Goals |
|---|---|---|---|---|---|---|---|---|---|---|---|
| 1 | GK | (Russia) RUS | Nikita Medvedev | 2 | 0 | 1 | 0 | 0 | 0 | 0+1 | 0 |
| 2 | DF | (Russia) RUS | Yegor Teslenko | 11 | 0 | 8+2 | 0 | 1 | 0 | 0 | 0 |
| 3 | DF | (Tunisia) TUN | Montassar Talbi | 27 | 0 | 25 | 0 | 2 | 0 | 0 | 0 |
| 7 | MF | (Russia) RUS | Soltmurad Bakayev | 33 | 2 | 15+14 | 2 | 2 | 0 | 0+2 | 0 |
| 8 | MF | (Russia) RUS | Aleksandr Lomovitsky | 13 | 1 | 11 | 1 | 2 | 0 | 0 | 0 |
| 10 | FW | (Russia) RUS | German Onugkha | 25 | 3 | 11+12 | 2 | 0+2 | 1 | 0 | 0 |
| 13 | FW | (Russia) RUS | Kirill Klimov | 1 | 0 | 0+1 | 0 | 0 | 0 | 0 | 0 |
| 14 | FW | (Russia) RUS | Mikhail Kostyukov | 15 | 1 | 7+6 | 1 | 0 | 0 | 1+1 | 0 |
| 18 | MF | (Russia) RUS | Marat Apshatsev | 10 | 0 | 3+5 | 0 | 0+2 | 0 | 0 | 0 |
| 20 | DF | (Russia) RUS | Vladislav Ignatyev | 14 | 1 | 4+7 | 1 | 1 | 0 | 1+1 | 0 |
| 22 | GK | (Russia) RUS | Yury Dyupin | 33 | 0 | 29 | 0 | 2 | 0 | 2 | 0 |
| 23 | DF | (Russia) RUS | Aleksandr Zuyev | 20 | 0 | 15+2 | 0 | 1+1 | 0 | 1 | 0 |
| 24 | DF | (Russia) RUS | Ivan Savitskiy | 1 | 0 | 0 | 0 | 0+1 | 0 | 0 | 0 |
| 28 | MF | (Denmark) DEN | Oliver Abildgaard | 22 | 1 | 20 | 1 | 0 | 0 | 2 | 0 |
| 31 | DF | (Russia) RUS | Georgi Zotov | 29 | 0 | 24+2 | 0 | 1 | 0 | 1+1 | 0 |
| 38 | MF | (Russia) RUS | Leon Musayev | 20 | 0 | 6+10 | 0 | 2 | 0 | 0+2 | 0 |
| 44 | FW | (Belarus) BLR | Vitaly Lisakovich | 12 | 6 | 10 | 4 | 2 | 2 | 0 | 0 |
| 56 | MF | (Russia) RUS | Lenar Fattakhov | 5 | 0 | 0+4 | 0 | 0+1 | 0 | 0 | 0 |
| 77 | DF | (Russia) RUS | Ilya Samoshnikov | 27 | 1 | 24 | 1 | 2 | 0 | 1 | 0 |
| 84 | DF | (Russia) RUS | Stepan Surikov | 1 | 0 | 0+1 | 0 | 0 | 0 | 0 | 0 |
| 85 | FW | (Russia) RUS | Daniil Kuznetsov | 9 | 0 | 0+8 | 0 | 0+1 | 0 | 0 | 0 |
| 97 | DF | (Russia) RUS | Konstantin Nizhegorodov | 3 | 0 | 1+2 | 0 | 0 | 0 | 0 | 0 |
| 98 | MF | (Russia) RUS | Konstantin Kuchayev | 10 | 1 | 9 | 1 | 1 | 0 | 0 | 0 |
Players who suspended their contracts:
| 4 | DF | (Croatia) CRO | Silvije Begić | 12 | 0 | 9 | 0 | 1 | 0 | 2 | 0 |
| 5 | DF | (Croatia) CRO | Filip Uremović | 21 | 0 | 17+1 | 0 | 0+1 | 0 | 2 | 0 |
| 6 | MF | (South Korea) KOR | Hwang In-beom | 18 | 2 | 17 | 2 | 0 | 0 | 1 | 0 |
| 11 | MF | (Denmark) DEN | Anders Dreyer | 14 | 8 | 14 | 8 | 0 | 0 | 0 | 0 |
| 21 | MF | (Georgia (country)) GEO | Khvicha Kvaratskhelia | 22 | 2 | 17+2 | 2 | 1 | 0 | 2 | 0 |
| 99 | FW | (Montenegro) MNE | Sead Hakšabanović | 23 | 1 | 20 | 1 | 1 | 0 | 2 | 0 |
Players away from the club on loan:
| 10 | MF | (Switzerland) SUI | Darko Jevtić | 8 | 1 | 4+2 | 1 | 0 | 0 | 2 | 0 |
| 19 | FW | (Russia) RUS | Ivan Ignatyev | 10 | 0 | 0+9 | 0 | 0 | 0 | 0+1 | 0 |
Players who left Rubin Kazan during the season:
| 8 | MF | (Russia) RUS | Oleg Shatov | 4 | 0 | 3 | 0 | 0 | 0 | 1 | 0 |
| 9 | FW | (Serbia) SRB | Đorđe Despotović | 10 | 1 | 6+3 | 1 | 0 | 0 | 1 | 0 |
| 16 | MF | (Japan) JPN | Mitsuki Saito | 3 | 0 | 0+2 | 0 | 0 | 0 | 0+1 | 0 |
| 25 | MF | (Russia) RUS | Denis Makarov | 1 | 0 | 0+1 | 0 | 0 | 0 | 0 | 0 |

=== Goal scorers ===
| Place | Position | Nation | Number | Name | Premier League | Russian Cup | UEFA Europa Conference League | Total |
|---|---|---|---|---|---|---|---|---|
| 1 | MF | (Denmark) | 11 | Anders Dreyer | 8 | 0 | 0 | 8 |
| 2 | FW | (Belarus) | 44 | Vitaly Lisakovich | 4 | 2 | 0 | 6 |
| 3 | | | | Own goal | 5 | 0 | 0 | 5 |
| 4 | FW | (Russia) | 10 | German Onugkha | 2 | 1 | 0 | 3 |
| 5 | MF | (South Korea) | 6 | Hwang In-beom | 2 | 0 | 0 | 2 |
| 5 | MF | (Russia) | 7 | Soltmurad Bakayev | 2 | 0 | 0 | 2 |
| 5 | MF | (Georgia (country)) | 21 | Khvicha Kvaratskhelia | 2 | 0 | 0 | 2 |
| 8 | DF | (Russia) | 77 | Ilya Samoshnikov | 1 | 0 | 0 | 1 |
| 8 | FW | (Serbia) | 9 | Đorđe Despotović | 1 | 0 | 0 | 1 |
| 8 | FW | (Russia) | 14 | Mikhail Kostyukov | 1 | 0 | 0 | 1 |
| 8 | FW | (Montenegro) | 99 | Sead Hakšabanović | 1 | 0 | 0 | 1 |
| 8 | MF | (Switzerland) | 10 | Darko Jevtić | 1 | 0 | 0 | 1 |
| 8 | MF | (Denmark) | 28 | Oliver Abildgaard | 1 | 0 | 0 | 1 |
| 8 | MF | (Russia) | 98 | Konstantin Kuchayev | 1 | 0 | 0 | 1 |
| 8 | DF | (Russia) | 20 | Vladislav Ignatyev | 1 | 0 | 0 | 1 |
| 8 | MF | (Russia) | 8 | Aleksandr Lomovitsky | 1 | 0 | 0 | 1 |
| | | | | TOTALS | 33 | 3 | 0 | 36 |

=== Clean sheets ===
| Place | Position | Nation | Number | Name | Premier League | Russian Cup | UEFA Europa Conference League | Total |
|---|---|---|---|---|---|---|---|---|
| 1 | GK | (Russia) | 22 | Yury Dyupin | 5 | 0 | 1 | 6 |
| | | | | TOTALS | 5 | 0 | 1 | 6 |

=== Disciplinary record ===
| Number | Nation | Position | Name | Premier League | | Russian Cup | | UEFA Europa Conference League | | Total | |
| Number | Nation | Position | Name | Yellow card | Red card | Yellow card | Red card | Yellow card | Red card | Yellow card | Red card |
| 2 | (Russia) | DF | Yegor Teslenko | 1 | 0 | 0 | 0 | 0 | 0 | 1 | 0 |
| 3 | (Tunisia) | DF | Montassar Talbi | 1 | 0 | 0 | 0 | 0 | 0 | 1 | 0 |
| 7 | (Russia) | MF | Soltmurad Bakayev | 3 | 0 | 0 | 0 | 0 | 0 | 3 | 0 |
| 8 | (Russia) | MF | Aleksandr Lomovitsky | 4 | 1 | 1 | 0 | 0 | 0 | 5 | 1 |
| 10 | (Russia) | FW | German Onugkha | 3 | 0 | 0 | 0 | 0 | 0 | 3 | 0 |
| 14 | (Russia) | FW | Mikhail Kostyukov | 1 | 0 | 0 | 0 | 2 | 0 | 3 | 0 |
| 20 | (Russia) | DF | Vladislav Ignatyev | 1 | 0 | 0 | 0 | 0 | 0 | 1 | 0 |
| 22 | (Russia) | GK | Yury Dyupin | 1 | 0 | 0 | 0 | 0 | 0 | 1 | 0 |
| 23 | (Russia) | DF | Aleksandr Zuyev | 6 | 0 | 0 | 0 | 0 | 0 | 6 | 0 |
| 28 | (Denmark) | MF | Oliver Abildgaard | 7 | 1 | 0 | 0 | 0 | 0 | 7 | 1 |
| 31 | (Russia) | DF | Georgi Zotov | 6 | 0 | 0 | 0 | 0 | 0 | 6 | 0 |
| 38 | (Russia) | MF | Leon Musayev | 3 | 1 | 2 | 0 | 1 | 0 | 6 | 1 |
| 44 | (Belarus) | FW | Vitaly Lisakovich | 0 | 1 | 0 | 0 | 0 | 0 | 0 | 1 |
| 56 | (Russia) | MF | Lenar Fattakhov | 1 | 0 | 0 | 0 | 0 | 0 | 1 | 0 |
| 77 | (Russia) | DF | Ilya Samoshnikov | 7 | 0 | 0 | 0 | 2 | 1 | 9 | 1 |
| 85 | (Russia) | FW | Daniil Kuznetsov | 1 | 0 | 1 | 0 | 0 | 0 | 2 | 0 |
| 97 | (Russia) | DF | Konstantin Nizhegorodov | 1 | 0 | 0 | 0 | 0 | 0 | 1 | 0 |
| 98 | (Russia) | MF | Konstantin Kuchayev | 2 | 0 | 0 | 0 | 0 | 0 | 2 | 0 |
Players who suspended their contracts:
| 4 | (Croatia) | DF | Silvije Begić | 4 | 1 | 0 | 0 | 0 | 0 | 4 | 1 |
| 5 | (Croatia) | DF | Filip Uremović | 6 | 0 | 0 | 0 | 0 | 0 | 6 | 0 |
| 21 | (Georgia (country)) | MF | Khvicha Kvaratskhelia | 6 | 0 | 1 | 0 | 0 | 0 | 7 | 0 |
| 99 | (Montenegro) | FW | Sead Hakšabanović | 1 | 0 | 0 | 0 | 0 | 0 | 1 | 0 |
Players away on loan:
| 4 | (Croatia) | DF | Silvije Begić | 3 | 0 | 0 | 0 | 0 | 0 | 3 | 0 |
| 6 | (South Korea) | MF | Hwang In-beom | 4 | 0 | 0 | 0 | 0 | 0 | 4 | 0 |
| 10 | (Switzerland) | MF | Darko Jevtić | 1 | 0 | 0 | 0 | 0 | 0 | 1 | 0 |
| 19 | (Russia) | FW | Ivan Ignatyev | 1 | 0 | 0 | 0 | 0 | 0 | 1 | 0 |
Players who left Rubin Kazan during the season:
| 8 | (Russia) | MF | Oleg Shatov | 1 | 0 | 0 | 0 | 0 | 0 | 1 | 0 |
| 9 | (Serbia) | FW | Đorđe Despotović | 2 | 0 | 0 | 0 | 0 | 0 | 2 | 0 |
| 16 | (Japan) | MF | Mitsuki Saito | 0 | 0 | 0 | 0 | 1 | 0 | 1 | 0 |
| | | | TOTALS | 78 | 5 | 5 | 0 | 6 | 1 | 89 | 6 |
