= Nizhegorodov =

Nizhegorodov (Russian: Нижегородов) is a Russian masculine surname, its feminine counterpart is Nizhegorodova. It may refer to

- Denis Nizhegorodov (born 1980), Russian race walker
- Gennadiy Nizhegorodov (born 1977), Russian football player
- Vladimir Nizhegorodov, Russian 1981 World Rowing Championships gold medallist
