= Leon Musayev =

Russian footballer (born 1999)

Leon Musayev Леон Мусаев
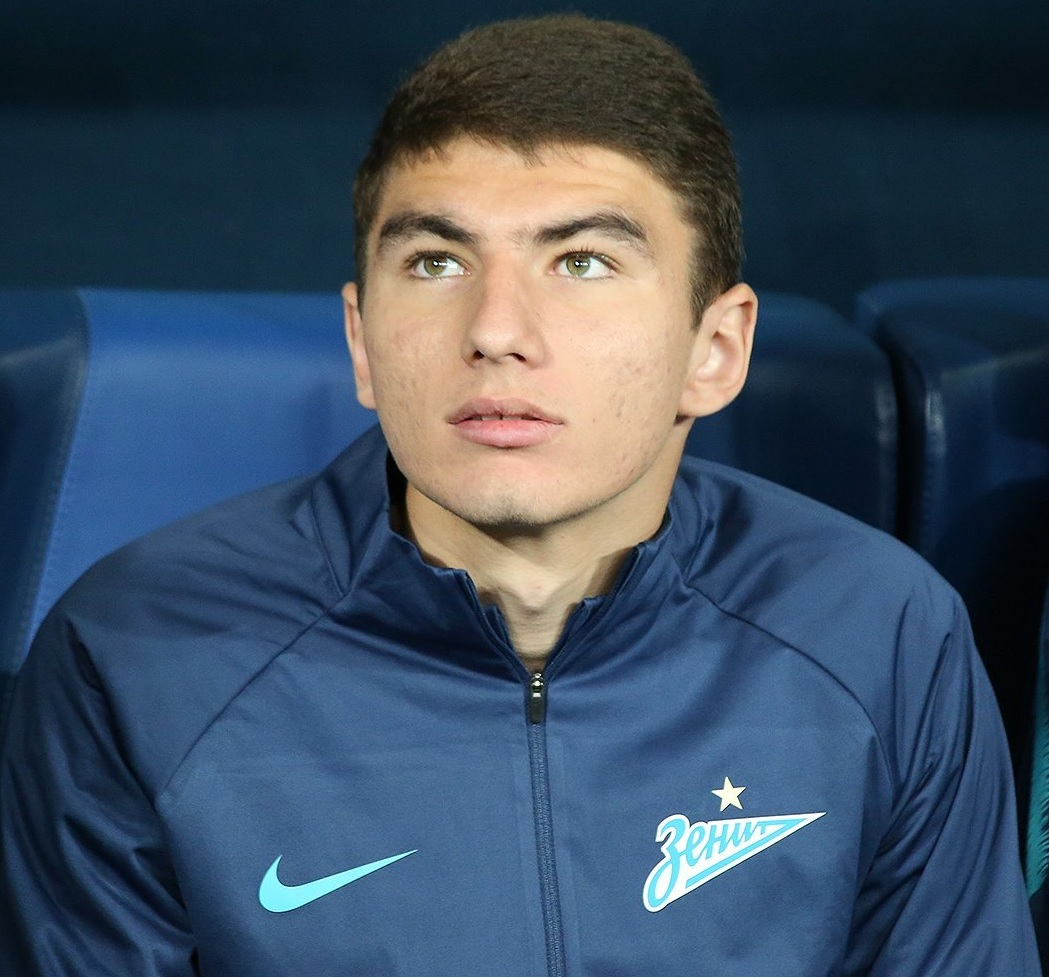
- Musayev with Zenit St. Petersburg in 2019

Personal information
- Full name: Leon Narimanovich Musayev
- Date of birth: 25 January 1999 (age 27)
- Place of birth: Saint Petersburg, Russia
- Height: 1.85 m (6 ft 1 in)
- Position: Midfielder

Team information
- Current team: Rodina Moscow
- Number: 38

Youth career
- 2005–2016: Zenit St. Petersburg

Senior career*
Years	Team	Apps	(Gls)
2016–2020	Zenit-2 St. Petersburg	72	(3)
2018–2020	Zenit St. Petersburg	16	(0)
2021–2024	Rubin Kazan	34	(2)
2024	→ Kuban Krasnodar (loan)	4	(0)
2024–	Rodina Moscow	54	(0)

International career^{‡}
2015–2016	Russia U17	9	(0)
2016–2017	Russia U18	6	(0)
2017	Russia U19	3	(0)
2019	Russia U21	3	(0)
- * Club domestic league appearances and goals as of 22 November 2026 ‡ National team caps and goals as of 5 June 2019

Leon Narimanovich Musayev (Russian: Лео́н Нарима́нович Муса́ев; born 25 January 1999) is a Russian footballer who plays as a defensive midfielder for Rodina Moscow.

== Club career ==
=== Zenit Saint Petersburg ===
He made his debut in the Russian Football National League for Zenit-2 St. Petersburg on 11 July 2016 in a game against Sokol Saratov.

He scored his first goal for Zenit-2 in the Russian Football National League match against Avangard Kursk on 12 August 2018.

In February 2019, he was moved to Zenit's main squad, and appeared during UEFA Europa League match on 21 February 2019, when Zenit won 3–1 against Fenerbahçe. He made his Russian Premier League debut for the club on 14 April 2019 in a game against Anzhi Makhachkala, as an 86th-minute substitute for Artem Dzyuba.

=== Rubin Kazan ===
On 29 January 2021, he signed a 5-year contract with Russian club Rubin Kazan.

=== Rodina Moscow ===
On 3 July 2024, Musayev moved to Russian First League club Rodina Moscow.

== Career statistics ==
As of 22 November 2026

Club	Season	League			Cup		Continental		Other		Total	
Club	Season	Division	Apps	Goals	Apps	Goals	Apps	Goals	Apps	Goals	Apps	Goals
Zenit-2 St. Petersburg	2016–17	Russian First League	8	0	—		—		1 (Note: Appearance in FNL Cup)	0	9	0
Zenit-2 St. Petersburg	2017–18	Russian First League	21	0	—		—		—		21	0
Zenit-2 St. Petersburg	2018–19	Russian First League	26	1	—		—		—		26	1
Zenit-2 St. Petersburg	2019–20	Russian Second League	13	2	—		—		—		13	2
Zenit-2 St. Petersburg	2020–21	Russian Second League	4	0	—		—		—		4	0
Zenit-2 St. Petersburg	Total		72	3	0	0	0	0	1	0	73	3
Zenit St. Petersburg	2018–19	Russian Premier League	4	0	—		1 (Note: Appearance in UEFA Europa League)	0	—		5	0
Zenit St. Petersburg	2019–20	Russian Premier League	9	0	1	0	0	0	0	0	10	0
Zenit St. Petersburg	2020–21	Russian Premier League	3	0	0	0	2 (Note: Appearances in UEFA Champions League)	0	1 (Note: Appearance in Russian Super Cup)	0	6	0
Zenit St. Petersburg	Total		16	0	1	0	3	0	1	0	21	0
Rubin Kazan	2020–21	Russian Premier League	10	0	—		—		—		10	0
Rubin Kazan	2021–22	Russian Premier League	16	0	2	0	2 (Note: Appearance in UEFA Conference League)	0	—		20	0
Rubin Kazan	2022–23	Russian First League	8	2	0	0	—		—		8	2
Rubin Kazan	2023–24	Russian Premier League	0	0	0	0	—		—		0	0
Rubin Kazan	Total		34	2	2	0	2	0	0	0	38	2
Kuban Krasnodar (loan)	2023–24	Russian First League	4	0	—		—		—		4	0
Rodina Moscow	2024–25	Russian First League	21	0	0	0	—		—		21	0
Rodina Moscow	2025–26	Russian First League	21	0	1	0	—		—		22	0
Rodina Moscow	2026–27	Russian Premier League	12	0	3	0	—		—		15	0
Rodina Moscow	Total		54	0	4	0	0	0	0	0	58	0
Career total			180	5	7	0	5	0	2	0	194	5

== Honours ==
Zenit Saint Petersburg

- Russian Premier League: 2018–19, 2019–20, 2020–21
- Russian Cup: 2019–20
- Russian Super Cup: 2020

== Personal life ==
Leon's younger brother Amir Musayev is also a footballer.
