= Igor Gorbunov =

Russian footballer (born 1994)

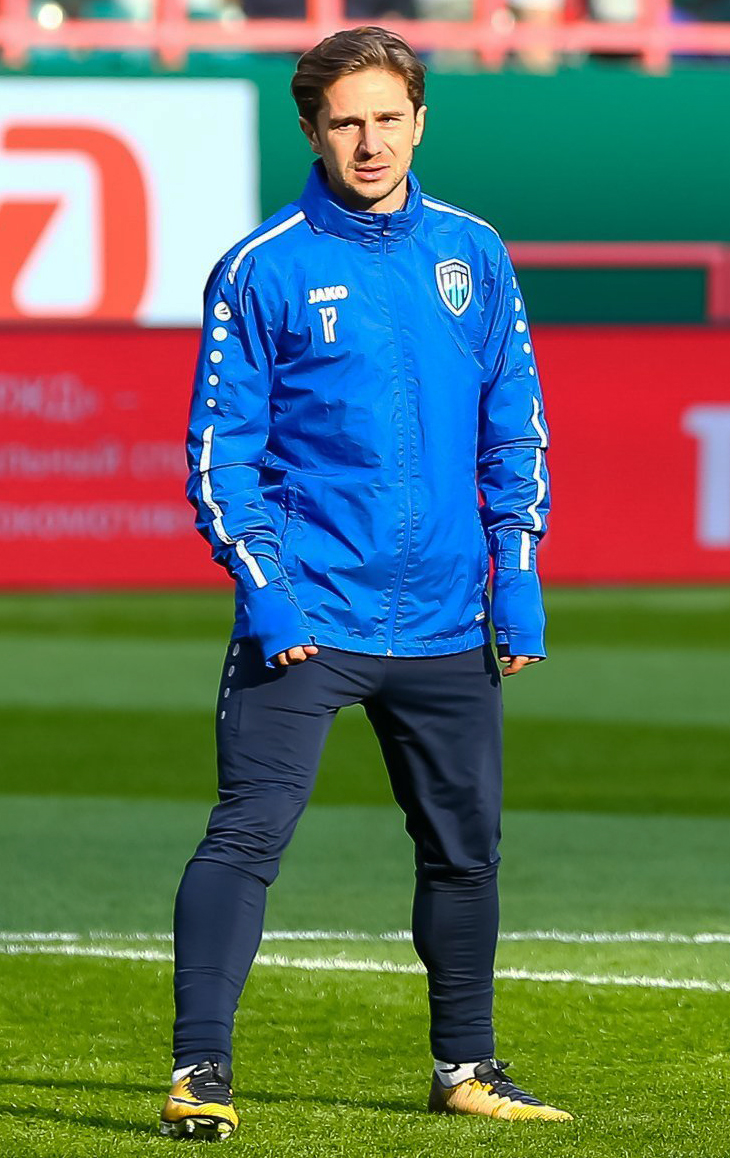
- Gorbunov with Nizhny Novgorod in 2022

Personal information
- Full name: Igor Vladimirovich Gorbunov
- Date of birth: 20 September 1994 (age 32)
- Place of birth: Nikitino, Inzhavinsky District, Tambov Oblast, Russia
- Height: 1.72 m (5 ft 8 in)
- Position: Midfielder

Team information
- Current team: FC Arsenal Tula
- Number: 17

Youth career
- 2002–2015: FC Dynamo Moscow

Senior career*
Years	Team	Apps	(Gls)
2015–2016	FC Dynamo Saint Petersburg	26	(3)
2016–2018	FC Olimpiyets Nizhny Novgorod	52	(12)
2018–2019	PFC Sochi	35	(5)
2019	FC Rotor Volgograd	22	(3)
2020	FC Armavir	1	(0)
2020–2022	FC Pari Nizhny Novgorod	57	(7)
2022–2023	FC Rubin Kazan	22	(1)
2023–2025	FC Torpedo Moscow	52	(7)
2025–	FC Arsenal Tula	26	(4)

International career^{‡}
2012	Russia U-18	3	(0)
2012–2013	Russia U-19	11	(0)
- * Club domestic league appearances and goals as of 16 May 2026 ‡ National team caps and goals as of 27 May 2013

Igor Vladimirovich Gorbunov (Russian: Игорь Владимирович Горбунов; born 20 September 1994) is a Russian football player who plays for FC Arsenal Tula. He is mostly deployed as a left midfielder, but also plays as winger, right midfielder or attacking midfielder.

== Club career ==
He made his debut in the Russian Professional Football League for FC Dynamo Saint Petersburg on 20 July 2015 in a game against FC Khimki.

He made his Russian Football National League debut for FC Olimpiyets Nizhny Novgorod on 8 July 2017 in a game against FC Avangard Kursk.

He made his Russian Premier League debut for FC Nizhny Novgorod on 26 July 2021 in a game against his former club PFC Sochi. He substituted Albert Sharipov in the 68th minute and scored a goal less than a minute later. This was Nizhny Novgorod's first ever game in the RPL, so it was also the club's first ever goal in the top tier. The game finished with the score of 1–0, giving the club its first victory in the top tier as well.

On 28 July 2022, Gorbunov signed a two-year contract with FC Rubin Kazan. Gorbunov's contract with Rubin was terminated by mutual consent on 19 June 2023.

On 20 June 2023, Gorbunov joined FC Torpedo Moscow on a three-year deal. The contract was terminated early by mutual consent in June 2025.

== Honours ==
- Russian Professional Football League Zone Ural-Povolzhye top scorer: 2016–17.

== Career statistics ==
As of 24 May 2025

Club	Season	League			Cup		Continental		Total	
Club	Season	Division	Apps	Goals	Apps	Goals	Apps	Goals	Apps	Goals
Dynamo St. Petersburg	2015–16	Russian Second League	26	3	1	0	–		27	3
Olimpiyets Nizhny Novgorod	2016–17	Russian Second League	17	10	0	0	–		17	10
Olimpiyets Nizhny Novgorod	2017–18	Russian First League	35	2	2	0	–		37	2
Sochi	2018–19	Russian First League	35	5	1	0	–		36	5
Rotor Volgograd	2019–20	Russian First League	35	5	1	0	–		36	5
Armavir	2019–20	Russian First League	1	0	–		–		1	0
Nizhny Novgorod	2020–21	Russian First League	33	5	2	0	–		35	5
Nizhny Novgorod	2021–22	Russian Premier League	24	2	1	0	–		25	2
Nizhny Novgorod	Total		109	19	5	0	0	0	114	19
Rubin Kazan	2022–23	Russian First League	22	1	1	0	–		23	1
Torpedo Moscow	2023–24	Russian First League	21	3	1	0	–		22	3
Torpedo Moscow	2024–25	Russian First League	31	4	2	0	–		33	4
Torpedo Moscow	Total		52	7	3	0	0	0	55	7
Career total			280	40	12	0	0	0	292	40
