= Yury Dyupin =

Russian football goalkeeper

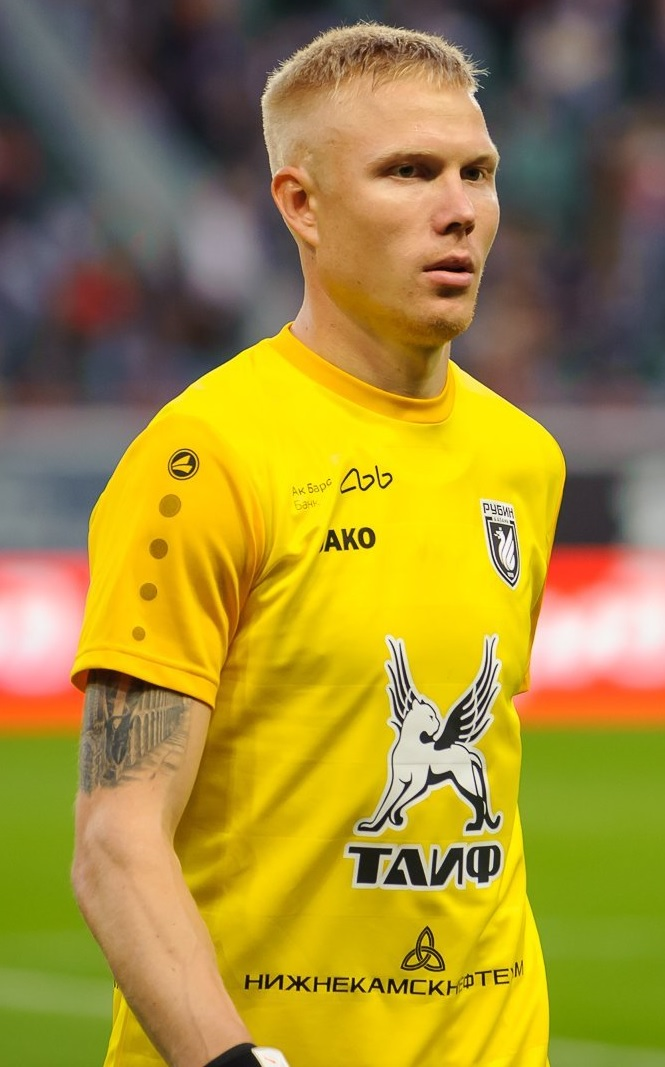
- Dyupin with Rubin Kazan in 2019

Personal information
- Full name: Yury Yuryevich Dyupin
- Date of birth: 17 March 1988 (age 38)
- Place of birth: Barnaul, Russian SFSR, Soviet Union
- Height: 1.87 m (6 ft 2 in)
- Position: Goalkeeper

Youth career
- 1994–2000: Dynamo Barnaul

Senior career*
Years	Team	Apps	(Gls)
2010	Dynamo Biysk		
2011–2012	Dynamo Barnaul	28	(0)
2012–2013	Metallurg-Kuzbass Novokuznetsk	13	(0)
2014–2015	Metallurg Novokuznetsk	24	(0)
2015–2016	SKA-Energiya Khabarovsk	38	(0)
2016–2018	Kuban Krasnodar	54	(0)
2018–2019	Anzhi Makhachkala	30	(0)
2019–2024	Rubin Kazan	143	(0)
2024–2025	Krasnodar	0	(0)
2025–2026	Sochi	10	(0)
- * Club domestic league appearances and goals as of 12 June 2026

Yury Yuryevich Dyupin (Russian: Юрий Юрьевич Дюпин; born 17 March 1988) is a Russian former football goalkeeper.

== Club career ==
Dyupin made his debut in the Russian Second Division for Dynamo Barnaul on 15 May 2011 in a game against Sibiryak Bratsk.

On 13 June 2019, he signed a one-year contract with Rubin Kazan.

On 15 June 2024, Dyupin moved to Krasnodar on a one-season deal. Dyupin left Krasnodar on 27 May 2025.

On 26 July 2025, Dyupin signed a one-season contract with Sochi.

He suspended his professional career in 2026.

== International career ==
He was called up to the Russia national football team for the first time in March 2021 for the World Cup qualifiers against Malta, Slovenia and Slovakia.

On 11 May 2021, he was included in the preliminary extended 30-man squad for UEFA Euro 2020. On 2 June 2021, he was included in the final squad. He did not appear in any games as Russia was eliminated at group stage.

== Career statistics ==
=== Club ===
As of match played 6 April 2026

Appearances and goals by club, season and competition
Club	Season	League			Cup		Europe		Other		Total	
Club	Season	Division	Apps	Goals	Apps	Goals	Apps	Goals	Apps	Goals	Apps	Goals
Polimer Barnaul	2008	Russian Amateur Football League	—									
Dynamo Biysk	2010	Russian Amateur Football League	—		1	0	—		—		1	0
Dynamo Barnaul	2011–12	Russian Second League	28	0	1	0	—		—		29	0
Metallurg-Kuzbass Novokuznetsk	2012–13	Russian First League	13	0	1	0	—		—		14	0
ShTs VIANOR Barnaul	2013	Altai Krai Championship	—									
Metallurg Novokuznetsk	2014–15	Russian Second League	24	0	3	0	—		—		27	0
SKA-Energiya Khabarovsk	2015–16	Russian First League	38	0	3	0	—		4 (Note: Appearances in FNL Cup)	0	45	0
Kuban Krasnodar	2016–17	Russian First League	17	0	0	0	—		3	0	20	0
Kuban Krasnodar	2017–18	Russian First League	37	0	1	0	—		—		38	0
Kuban Krasnodar	Total		54	0	1	0	—		3	0	58	0
Anzhi Makhachkala	2018–19	Russian Premier League	30	0	1	0	—		—		31	0
Rubin Kazan	2019–20	Russian Premier League	30	0	0	0	—		—		30	0
Rubin Kazan	2020–21	Russian Premier League	26	0	1	0	—		—		27	0
Rubin Kazan	2021–22	Russian Premier League	29	0	2	0	2 (Note: Appearances in the UEFA Europa Conference League)	0	—		33	0
Rubin Kazan	2022–23	Russian First League	29	0	0	0	—		—		29	0
Rubin Kazan	2023–24	Russian Premier League	29	0	0	0	—		—		29	0
Rubin Kazan	Total		143	0	3	0	2	0	0	0	148	0
Krasnodar	2024–25	Russian Premier League	0	0	5	0	—		—		5	0
Sochi	2025–26	Russian Premier League	10	0	2	0	—		—		12	0
Career total			340	0	21	0	2	0	7	0	370	0

== Honours ==
Krasnodar

- Russian Premier League: 2024–25
