= Merabi Uridia =

Russian footballer

Merab Uridia
Personal information
- Full name: Merabi Mamukovich Uridia
- Date of birth: 7 April 1993 (age 33)
- Place of birth: Batumi, Georgia
- Height: 1.75 m (5 ft 9 in)
- Positions: Midfielder; forward

Team information
- Current team: KAMAZ Naberezhnye Chelny
- Number: 25

Youth career
- 2000–2008: Moscow
- 2009: FC Spartak Moscow
- 2009–2010: FC Lokomotiv Moscow
- 2010–2013: Rubin Kazan

Senior career*
Years	Team	Apps	(Gls)
2013–2014	Rubin Kazan	0	(0)
2013–2014	→ Neftekhimik (loan)	44	(8)
2014–2015	Volga Nizhny Novgorod	26	(0)
2015–2016	Shukura Kobuleti	18	(4)
2017	Torpedo Moscow	8	(2)
2017–2023	Neftekhimik	166	(57)
2023	Rubin Kazan	14	(2)
2024–2025	Chernomorets Novorossiysk	44	(9)
2025–2026	Fakel Voronezh	32	(2)
2026–	KAMAZ Naberezhnye Chelny	0	(0)

International career
2010	Russia U-17	8	(2)
2011	Russia U-18	5	(2)
- * Club domestic league appearances and goals as of 15 September 2026

Merabi Mamukovich Uridia (Russian: Мераби Мамукович Уридия; born 7 April 1993) is a Russian football player who plays for KAMAZ Naberezhnye Chelny. He also holds Georgian citizenship.

== Club career ==
He made his debut in the Russian Football National League for Neftekhimik Nizhnekamsk on 11 March 2013 in a game against Rotor Volgograd.

Uridia made his Russian Premier League debut for Rubin Kazan on 22 July 2023 against Lokomotiv Moscow. His contract with Rubin was terminated by mutual consent on 10 October 2023.

== Career statistics ==
As of 18 August 2026

Club	Season	League			Cup		Continental		Other		Total	
Club	Season	Division	Apps	Goals	Apps	Goals	Apps	Goals	Apps	Goals	Apps	Goals
Rubin Kazan	2011–12	Russian Premier League	0	0	—		—		—		0	0
Rubin Kazan	2012–13	Russian Premier League	0	0	0	0	0	0	—		0	0
Rubin Kazan	Total		0	0	0	0	0	0	0	0	0	0
Neftekhimik (loan)	2012–13	Russian First League	11	4	—		—		2 (Note: Appearances in FNL Cup)	0	13	4
Neftekhimik (loan)	2013–14	Russian First League	33	4	2	0	—		—		35	4
Neftekhimik (loan)	Total		44	8	2	0	0	0	2	0	48	8
Volga Nizhny Novgorod	2014–15	Russian First League	26	0	1	0	—		—		27	0
Shukura Kobuleti	2015–16	Erovnuli Liga	18	4	1	0	—		—		19	4
Torpedo Moscow	2016–17	Russian Second League	8	2	—		—		—		8	2
Neftekhimik	2017–18	Russian Second League	23	6	1	0	—		—		24	6
Neftekhimik	2018–19	Russian Second League	24	11	4	0	—		—		28	11
Neftekhimik	2019–20	Russian First League	27	11	1	0	—		—		28	11
Neftekhimik	2020–21	Russian First League	37	17	0	0	—		—		37	17
Neftekhimik	2021–22	Russian First League	37	7	1	0	—		—		38	7
Neftekhimik	2022–23	Russian First League	18	5	1	0	—		—		19	5
Neftekhimik	Total		166	57	8	0	0	0	0	0	174	57
Rubin Kazan	2022–23	Russian First League	10	2	—		—		—		10	2
Rubin Kazan	2023–24	Russian Premier League	4	0	5	0	—		—		9	0
Rubin Kazan	Total		14	2	5	0	0	0	0	0	19	2
Chernomorets Novorossiysk	2023–24	Russian First League	10	2	—		—		—		10	2
Chernomorets Novorossiysk	2024–25	Russian First League	34	7	1	0	—		—		35	7
Chernomorets Novorossiysk	Total		44	9	1	0	0	0	0	0	45	9
Fakel Voronezh	2025–26	Russian First League	30	2	2	0	—		—		32	2
Fakel Voronezh	2026–27	Russian Premier League	2	0	2	0	—		—		4	0
Fakel Voronezh	Total		32	2	4	0	0	0	0	0	36	2
Career total			352	84	22	0	0	0	2	0	376	84

== Honours ==
=== Individual ===
- Russian Professional Football League Zone Ural-Privolzhye best player (2018–19).
