= Stepan Surikov =

Russian football player

Personal information
- Full name: Stepan Vladislavovich Surikov
- Date of birth: 30 January 2002 (age 24)
- Place of birth: Izhevsk, Russia
- Height: 1.87 m (6 ft 2 in)
- Position: Defensive midfielder

Team information
- Current team: Izhevsk
- Number: 88

Youth career
- 2019–2021: Rubin Kazan

Senior career*
Years	Team	Apps	(Gls)
2021–	Rubin Kazan	1	(0)
2022	→ Salyut Belgorod (loan)	11	(0)
2022–2023	→ SKA Rostov-on-Don (loan)	5	(0)
2023	→ Salyut Belgorod (loan)	11	(1)
2023–2026	Rubin-2 Kazan	59	(1)
2026–	Izhevsk	25	(1)

International career^{‡}
2018	Russia U16	2	(0)
2019	Russia U18	6	(0)
- * Club domestic league appearances and goals as of 1 November 2026 ‡ National team caps and goals as of 18 November 2019

Stepan Vladislavovich Surikov (Russian: Степан Владиславович Суриков; born 30 January 2002) is a Russian football player who plays for Izhevsk.

== Club career ==
He was first called up to the senior squad of Rubin Kazan in November 2020. He made his debut in the Russian Premier League for Rubin on 13 September 2021 in a game against Ural Yekaterinburg.

== Career statistics ==
As of 10 June 2022

Club	Season	League			Cup		Continental		Total	
Club	Season	Division	Apps	Goals	Apps	Goals	Apps	Goals	Apps	Goals
Rubin Kazan	2020–21	RPL	0	0	0	0	–		0	0
Rubin Kazan	2021–22	RPL	1	0	0	0	0	0	1	0
Rubin Kazan	Total		1	0	0	0	0	0	1	0
Salyut Belgorod	2021–22	FNL 2	11	0	–		–		11	0
Career total			12	0	0	0	0	0	12	0
