= Amir Musayev =

Russian football player (born 2008)

Personal information
- Full name: Amir Narimanovich Musayev
- Date of birth: 1 September 2008 (age 18)
- Place of birth: Saint Petersburg, Russia
- Height: 1.79 m (5 ft 10 in)
- Position: Central midfielder

Team information
- Current team: Zenit St. Petersburg
- Number: 38

Youth career
- –2026: Zenit St. Petersburg

Senior career*
Years	Team	Apps	(Gls)
2026–	Zenit St. Petersburg	2	(0)

International career^{‡}
2023	Russia U16	2	(1)
2024	Russia U17	2	(0)
2026–	Russia U19	5	(0)
- * Club domestic league appearances and goals as of 21 November 2026 ‡ National team caps and goals as of 6 October 2026

Amir Narimanovich Musayev (Russian: Амир Нариманович Мусаев; born 1 September 2008) is a Russian football player who plays as a central midfielder for Zenit St. Petersburg.

== Club career ==
Musayev was raised in the youth academy of Zenit St. Petersburg and signed his first professional contract with Zenit in December 2023. In July 2025, he extended his contract with Zenit to June 2028.

Musayev was promoted to Zenit's senior squad in the summer of 2026, and made his debut on 2 September 2026 in a Russian Cup game against Dynamo Makhachkala. On 14 October 2026, Musayev scored his first Zenit goal in the return Cup game against Dynamo Makhachkala.

On 25 October 2026, Musayev made his Russian Premier League debut for Zenit, once again against Dynamo Makhachkala.

== Personal life ==
Amir's older brother Leon Musayev is also a footballer and played for Zenit in the past.

== Career statistics ==
As of 21 November 2026

Club	Season	League			Cup		Total	
Club	Season	Division	Apps	Goals	Apps	Goals	Apps	Goals
Zenit St. Petersburg	2026–27	Russian Premier League	2	0	3	1	5	1
Career total			2	0	3	1	5	1
