= Konstantin Nizhegorodov =

Russian footballer

Personal information
- Full name: Konstantin Gennadyevich Nizhegorodov
- Date of birth: 21 June 2002 (age 24)
- Place of birth: Moscow, Russia
- Height: 1.87 m (6 ft 2 in)
- Position: Left-back

Team information
- Current team: Rubin Kazan
- Number: 4

Youth career
- –2018: Chornomorets Odesa
- 2018–2019: Schalke 04
- 2019–2021: Hansa Rostock

Senior career*
Years	Team	Apps	(Gls)
2021–	Rubin Kazan	36	(2)
2023–2024	→ Arsenal Tula (loan)	15	(0)
- * Club domestic league appearances and goals as of 1 August 2026

Konstantin Gennadyevich Nizhegorodov (Russian: Константин Геннадьевич Нижегородов; born 21 June 2002) is a Russian football player who plays as a left-back for Rubin Kazan.

== Club career ==
On 11 June 2021, he signed with Russian Premier League club Rubin Kazan. He made his debut in the RPL for Rubin on 13 September 2021 in a game against Ural Yekaterinburg.

On 5 July 2023, Nizhegorodov joined Arsenal Tula on a season-long loan.

== Personal life ==
His father Gennadiy Nizhegorodov is a former Russian international footballer. His mother is the sister of the wife of footballer Ilya Tsymbalar.

== Career statistics ==
As of match played 2 September 2026

Appearances and goals by club, season and competition
Club	Season	League			Cup		Europe		Other		Total	
Club	Season	Division	Apps	Goals	Apps	Goals	Apps	Goals	Apps	Goals	Apps	Goals
Rubin Kazan	2021–22	Russian Premier League	3	0	0	0	0	0	—		3	0
Rubin Kazan	2022–23	Russian First League	4	1	1	0	—		—		5	1
Rubin Kazan	2024–25	Russian Premier League	10	0	6	0	—		—		16	0
Rubin Kazan	2025–26	Russian Premier League	17	1	5	0	—		—		22	1
Rubin Kazan	2026–27	Russian Premier League	2	0	2	0	—		—		4	0
Rubin Kazan	Total		36	2	14	0	0	0	—		50	2
Arsenal Tula (loan)	2023–24	Russian First League	15	0	1	0	—		0	0	16	0
Career total			51	2	15	0	0	0	0	0	66	2
