= Vitaly Lisakovich =

Belarusian footballer

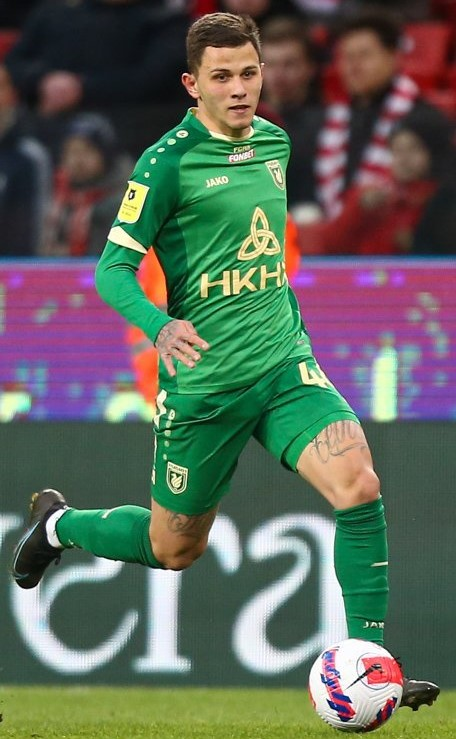
- Lisakovich with Rubin Kazan in 2022

Personal information
- Full name: Vitaly Mikhaylovich Lisakovich
- Date of birth: 8 February 1998 (age 28)
- Place of birth: Minsk, Belarus
- Height: 1.79 m (5 ft 10 in)
- Position: Forward

Team information
- Current team: Tobol
- Number: 99

Youth career
- 2011–2016: Shakhtyor Soligorsk

Senior career*
Years	Team	Apps	(Gls)
2016–2020	Shakhtyor Soligorsk	47	(16)
2018	→ Dinamo Zagreb II (loan)	11	(1)
2019	→ Rudeš (loan)	14	(4)
2019	→ Varaždin (loan)	11	(1)
2020–2022	Lokomotiv Moscow	41	(4)
2022–2024	Rubin Kazan	42	(14)
2024	→ Baltika Kaliningrad (loan)	12	(4)
2024–2025	Baltika Kaliningrad	18	(6)
2025	Celje	9	(0)
2026	Torpedo-BelAZ Zhodino	8	(3)
2026–	Tobol	10	(5)

International career^{‡}
2014	Belarus U17	3	(1)
2016	Belarus U19	3	(1)
2016–2018	Belarus U21	6	(1)
2019–	Belarus	32	(7)
- * Club domestic league appearances and goals as of 1 November 2026 ‡ National team caps and goals as of 6 October 2026 (UTC)

Vitaly Mikhaylovich Lisakovich (Belarusian: Віталь Міхайлавіч Лісаковіч; Russian: Виталий Михайлович Лисакович; born 8 February 1998) is a Belarusian professional footballer who plays as a forward for Tobol and the Belarus national team. He has also appeared for the U17, U19 and U21 Belarus teams.

== Club career ==
On 8 August 2020, Lisakovich signed a four-year contract with Russian Premier League club Lokomotiv Moscow.

On 21 January 2022, he moved to Rubin Kazan, signing a 3.5-year contract. On 13 January 2024, Lisakovich moved on loan to Baltika Kaliningrad until the end of the 2023–24 season.

On 12 September 2024, Lisakovich returned to Baltika Kaliningrad, now in the Russian First League, on a permanent basis for the 2024–25 season.

On 2 September 2025, Lisakovich signed a contract with Celje in Slovenia until 31 December 2026.

== International career ==
Lisakovich made his senior international debut on 10 October 2019 in a Euro 2020 qualifier against Estonia. He substituted Yevgeniy Yablonskiy in the 83rd minute.

== Family ==
His younger brothers Dmitry Lisakovich and Ruslan Lisakovich are also professional footballers.

== Career statistics ==
=== Club ===
As of match played 24 May 2025

Appearances and goals by club, season and competition
Club	Season	League			National cup (Note: Includes Belarusian Cup, Croatian Cup, Russian Cup)		Continental		Other		Total	
Club	Season	Division	Apps	Goals	Apps	Goals	Apps	Goals	Apps	Goals	Apps	Goals
Shakhtyor Soligorsk	2016	Vysheyshaya Liga	11	1	2	0	0	0	1 (Note: Appearance in Belarusian Super Cup)	0	14	1
Shakhtyor Soligorsk	2017	Vysheyshaya Liga	16	6	4	2	2 (Note: Appearance(s) in UEFA Europa League)	0	—		22	8
Shakhtyor Soligorsk	2018	Vysheyshaya Liga	2	0	0	0	1	0	—		3	0
Shakhtyor Soligorsk	2019|	Vysheyshaya Liga	0	0	0	0	0	0	—		0	0
Shakhtyor Soligorsk	2020	Vysheyshaya Liga	18	9	4	2	0	0	1	0	23	11
Shakhtyor Soligorsk	Total		47	16	10	4	3	0	2	0	62	20
Dinamo Zagreb II (loan)	2017–18	Druga HNL	11	1	—		—		—		11	1
Rudeš (loan)	2018–19	Prva HNL	14	4	—		—		—		14	4
Varaždin (loan)	2019–20	Prva HNL	11	1	2	2	—		—		13	3
Lokomotiv Moscow	2020–21	Russian Premier League	26	2	3	0	3 (Note: Appearances in UEFA Champions League)	1	0	0	32	3
Lokomotiv Moscow	2021–22	Russian Premier League	15	2	0	0	5	0	1 (Note: Appearance in Russian Super Cup)	0	21	2
Lokomotiv Moscow	Total		41	4	3	0	8	1	1	0	53	5
Rubin Kazan	2021–22	Russian Premier League	10	4	2	2	—		—		12	6
Rubin Kazan	2022–23	Russian First League	29	10	0	0	—		—		29	10
Rubin Kazan	2023–24	Russian Premier League	3	0	2	0	—		—		5	0
Rubin Kazan	2024–25	Russian Premier League	0	0	0	0	—		—		0	0
Rubin Kazan	Total		42	14	4	2	—		—		46	16
Baltika Kaliningrad (loan)	2023–24	Russian Premier League	12	4	6	0	—		—		18	4
Baltika Kaliningrad	2024–25	Russian First League	18	6	0	0	–		–		18	6
Career total			196	50	25	8	11	1	3	0	235	59

=== International ===
As of match played 6 October 2026

Appearances and goals by national team and year
National team	Year	Apps	Goals
Belarus	2019	3	0
Belarus	2020	9	2
Belarus	2021	8	3
Belarus	2022	0	0
Belarus	2023	1	0
Belarus	2024	1	0
Belarus	2025	6	2
Belarus	2026	4	0
Total		32	7

Scores and results list Belarus's goal tally first, score column indicates score after each Lisakovich goal.

List of international goals scored by Vitaly Lisakovich
No.	Date	Venue	Opponent	Score	Result	Competition
1	7 September 2020	Almaty Central Stadium, Almaty, Kazakhstan	Kazakhstan	2–1	2–1	2020–21 UEFA Nations League C
2	11 October 2020	LFF Stadium, Vilnius, Lithuania	Lithuania	1–1	2–2	2020–21 UEFA Nations League C
3	27 March 2021	Dinamo Stadium, Minsk, Belarus	Estonia	1–1	4–2	2022 FIFA World Cup qualification
4	27 March 2021	Dinamo Stadium, Minsk, Belarus	Estonia	4–2	4–2	2022 FIFA World Cup qualification
5	5 September 2021	Central Stadium, Kazan, Russia	Wales	1–1	2–3	2022 FIFA World Cup qualification
6	20 March 2025	Pamir Stadium, Dushanbe, Tajikistan	Tajikistan	1–0	5–0	Friendly
7	20 March 2025	Pamir Stadium, Dushanbe, Tajikistan	Tajikistan	4–0	5–0	Friendly

== Honours ==
Shakhtyor Soligorsk

- Belarusian Premier League: 2020

Lokomotiv Moscow

- Russian Cup: 2020–21
