= Marat Apshatsev =

Russian footballer

Personal information
- Full name: Marat Robertovich Apshatsev
- Date of birth: 27 May 2001 (age 25)
- Place of birth: Nalchik, Russia
- Height: 1.77 m (5 ft 10 in)
- Position: Midfielder

Team information
- Current team: Dynamo Makhachkala (on loan from Rubin Kazan)
- Number: 6

Youth career
- Krasnodar

Senior career*
Years	Team	Apps	(Gls)
2018–2021	Spartak Nalchik	70	(3)
2021	Chayka Peschanokopskoye	0	(0)
2021	Tom Tomsk	9	(0)
2021–	Rubin Kazan	44	(2)
2026–	→ Dynamo Makhachkala (loan)	14	(0)

International career^{‡}
2019	Russia U18	3	(1)
- * Club domestic league appearances and goals as of 22 November 2026 ‡ National team caps and goals as of 14 June 2019

Marat Robertovich Apshatsev (Russian: Марат Робертович Апшацев; born 27 May 2001) is a Russian football player who plays as a central midfielder for Dynamo Makhachkala on loan from Rubin Kazan.

== Club career ==
He made his debut in the Russian Football National League for Tom Tomsk on 15 September 2021 in a game against Torpedo Moscow.

On 3 December 2021, Apshatsev signed a 4.5-year contract with Rubin Kazan. He made his debut in the Russian Premier League for Rubin on 28 February 2022 in a game against FC Zenit Saint Petersburg.

On 15 July 2025, his contract with Rubin was extended to 2028.

On 1 July 2026, Apshatsev joined Dynamo Makhachkala on loan for the 2026–27 season, with an option to buy.

== Career statistics ==
As of match played 22 November 2026

Appearances and goals by club, season and competition
Club	Season	League			Cup		Total	
Club	Season	Division	Apps	Goals	Apps	Goals	Apps	Goals
Spartak Nalchik	2018–19	Russian Second League	22	0	1	0	23	0
Spartak Nalchik	2019–20	Russian Second League	18	0	1	0	19	0
Spartak Nalchik	2020–21	Russian Second League	30	3	2	0	32	3
Spartak Nalchik	Total		70	3	4	0	74	3
Tom Tomsk	2021–22	Russian First League	9	0	—		9	0
Rubin Kazan	2021–22	Russian Premier League	8	0	2	0	10	0
Rubin Kazan	2022–23	Russian First League	19	2	1	0	20	2
Rubin Kazan	2023–24	Russian Premier League	8	0	6	1	14	1
Rubin Kazan	2024–25	Russian Premier League	7	0	6	0	13	0
Rubin Kazan	2025–26	Russian Premier League	2	0	5	0	7	0
Rubin Kazan	Total		44	2	20	1	64	3
Dynamo Makhachkala (loan)	2026–27	Russian Premier League	14	0	3	0	17	0
Career total			137	5	27	1	164	6
