= Lenar Fattakhov =

Russian footballer

Personal information
- Full name: Lenar Ravilevich Fattakhov
- Date of birth: 12 May 2003 (age 23)
- Height: 1.73 m (5 ft 8 in)
- Position: Right-back

Team information
- Current team: Rubin-2 Kazan
- Number: 7

Youth career
- Rubin Kazan

Senior career*
Years	Team	Apps	(Gls)
2022–2024	Rubin Kazan	10	(0)
2023–2024	→ Kuban Krasnodar (loan)	21	(0)
2024–	Rubin-2 Kazan	37	(3)
2026	→ Mashuk-KMV (loan)	13	(2)
- * Club domestic league appearances and goals as of 1 November 2026

Lenar Ravilevich Fattakhov (Russian: Ленар Равилевич Фаттахов; born 12 May 2003) is a Russian football player who plays as a right back for Rubin-2 Kazan.

== Club career ==
He made his debut in the Russian Premier League for Rubin Kazan on 20 March 2022 in a game against CSKA Moscow.

== Career statistics ==
As of 21 May 2022

Club	Season	League			Cup		Continental		Total	
Club	Season	Division	Apps	Goals	Apps	Goals	Apps	Goals	Apps	Goals
Rubin Kazan	2021–22	RPL	4	0	1	0	–		5	0
Career total			4	0	1	0	0	0	5	0
