= Gennady Nizhegorodov =

Russian footballer

Personal information
- Full name: Gennady Aleksandrovich Nizhegorodov
- Date of birth: 7 June 1977 (age 49)
- Place of birth: Odesa, Ukrainian SSR, Soviet Union
- Height: 1.81 m (5 ft 11 in)
- Position: Defender

Youth career
- Chornomorets Odesa
- SCA Odesa

Senior career*
| Years | Team | Apps | (Gls) |
| 1993–1995 | Volgar-Gazprom Astrakhan | 73 | (1) |
| 1996–1999 | Lokomotiv Nizhny Novgorod | 89 | (0) |
| 2000–2004 | Lokomotiv Moscow | 162 | (0) |
| 2005 | Terek Grozny | 15 | (0) |
| 2006 | Shinnik Yaroslavl | 8 | (0) |
| 2006–2009 | Chornomorets Odesa | 69 | (0) |
| 2009–2010 | Rheindorf Altach | | |

International career
| 1998–1999 | Russia U-21 | 11 | (0) |
| 2000–2003 | Russia | 9 | (0) |

Managerial career
- 2012–2014: Chornomorets Odesa (assistant)
- 2014–2021: Chornomorets Odesa (youth)
- * Club domestic league appearances and goals

Gennady Aleksandrovich Nizhegorodov (Russian: Геннадий Александрович Нижегородов, Ukrainian: Генна́дій Олекса́ндрович Ніжеґоро́дов; born 7 June 1977) is a Russian football manager and a former player who is best known for his time at Lokomotiv Moscow, with whom he spent four seasons and won a number of trophies, including the Russian Premier League in 2002 and 2004.

Under manager Yuri Syomin, he usually played as both right and left center back in formations with three central defenders.

== Club career ==
Nizhegorodov began his career at FC Volgar-Gazprom Astrakhan in Russia in 1993. In 1996, he moved to FC Lokomotiv Nizhny Novgorod, before moving to FC Lokomotiv Moscow in 2000, where he stayed until 2004, making 125 appearances for the club. He moved to Chechnya club, FC Terek Grozny in 2004, but only played 10 games before moving to FC Shinnik Yaroslavl in 2006, where he played eight games before moving later that year to his home town to play for FC Chornomorets Odesa.

== International career ==
Although born in Odesa (today Ukraine), Nizhegorodov preferred to play for the Russia national football team, capping nine games.

== Personal life ==
His son Konstantin Nizhegorodov is now a professional footballer.

== Honors as player ==
- Russian Premier League
  - Winner: 2 (2002, 2004)
  - Runner-up: 2 ( 2000, 2001)
- Russian Cup
  - Winner: 2 (1999/00, 2000/01)
- Russian Super Cup
  - Winner: (2003)
