= Mitsuki Saito =

Japanese association football player

Mitsuki Saito 齊藤 未月
Personal information
- Full name: Mitsuki Saito
- Date of birth: 10 January 1999 (age 27)
- Place of birth: Fujisawa, Kanagawa, Japan
- Height: 1.66 m (5 ft 5 in)
- Position: Midfielder

Team information
- Current team: Kyoto Sanga
- Number: 32

Youth career
- Fujisawa FC
- –2016: Shonan Bellmare

Senior career*
Years	Team	Apps	(Gls)
2016–2022	Shonan Bellmare	112	(4)
2021	→ Rubin Kazan (loan)	2	(0)
2022	→ Gamba Osaka (loan)	26	(2)
2023	→ Vissel Kobe (loan)	22	(0)
2024–2026	Vissel Kobe	2	(0)
2025	Kyoto Sanga (loan)	3	(0)
2026–	Kyoto Sanga	3	(0)

International career^{‡}
2015	Japan U17	1	(0)
2016	Japan U18	3	(0)
2018	Japan U19	3	(0)
2019	Japan U20	4	(0)
2020–	Japan U23	2	(0)
Medal record
Shonan Bellmare
Winner	J.League Cup	2018
Representing Japan
AFC U-19 Championship
Bronze medal – third place	2018
- * Club domestic league appearances and goals as of 1 August 2026 ‡ National team caps and goals as of 15 January 2020

Mitsuki Saito (齊藤 未月, Saitō Mitsuki; born 10 January 1999) is a Japanese footballer who plays as a midfielder for J1 League club Kyoto Sanga. He played as a defensive midfielder early in his career.

== Career ==
Mitsuki Saito was promoted to top team from youth team of J1 League club Shonan Bellmare in 2016. He scored his first goal for the club on a 2–1 loss against V-Varen Nagasaki at the group stage of the 2018 J.League Cup.

On 14 December 2020, he joined Russian Premier League club FC Rubin Kazan on a 1.5-year loan with an option to purchase. On 16 February 2021 he was operated on due to an injury to ankle tendons, recovery was expected to last 4 months, he was not able to play for Rubin in the 2020–21 season. Upon his recovery from injury, he made his debut for Rubin on 12 August 2021 in a Europa Conference League qualifier against the Polish club Raków Częstochowa. He substituted Hwang In-beom in the 106th minute in the extra time, as Rubin lost 0–1 and were eliminated from the competition. He made his RPL debut for Rubin on 22 August 2021 in a game against FC Khimki, he substituted Darko Jevtić in the 81st minute. On 31 August 2021, he was removed from Rubin's RPL squad once again.

On 7 January 2022, he joined Gamba Osaka on loan until 31 January 2023.

== Career statistics ==
As of 19 September 2025.

Appearances and goals by club, season and competition
Club	Season	League			National cup (Note: Includes Emperor's Cup)		League cup (Note: Includes J. League Cup)		Continental (Note: Includes UEFA Conference League and AFC Champions League)		Other		Total	
Club	Season	Division	Apps	Goals	Apps	Goals	Apps	Goals	Apps	Goals	Apps	Goals	Apps	Goals
Shonan Bellmare	2015	J1 League	0	0	1	0	0	0	—		—		1	0
Shonan Bellmare	2016	J1 League	5	0	1	1	5	0	—		—		11	1
Shonan Bellmare	2017	J2 League	30	0	2	0	—		—		—		32	0
Shonan Bellmare	2018	J1 League	18	1	2	0	8	1	—		—		28	2
Shonan Bellmare	2019	J1 League	26	1	0	0	3	0	—		1 (Note: Appearance in J1/J2 play-off)	0	30	1
Shonan Bellmare	2020	J1 League	33	2	—		1	0	—		—		34	2
Shonan Bellmare	Total		112	4	6	1	17	1	—		1	0	136	6
Rubin Kazan (loan)	2021–22	Russian Premier League	2	0	—		—		1	0	—		3	0
Gamba Osaka (loan)	2022	J1 League	26	2	2	0	3	0	—		—		31	2
Vissel Kobe (loan)	2023	J1 League	22	0	3	1	3	0	—		—		28	1
Vissel Kobe	2024	J1 League	0	0	0	0	0	0	—		—		0	0
Vissel Kobe	2025	J1 League	2	0	0	0	0	0	2	0	1 (Note: Appearance in the Japanese Super Cup)	0	5	0
Vissel Kobe	Total		2	0	0	0	0	0	2	0	1	0	5	0
Kyoto Sanga (loan)	2025	J1 League	0	0	0	0	0	0	—		—		0	0
Career total			164	6	11	2	23	1	3	0	2	0	203	9

== Honours ==
Vissel Kobe

- J1 League: 2023, 2024
