= Kirill Morozov =

Russian footballer

Personal information
- Full name: Kirill Pavlovich Morozov
- Date of birth: 11 April 1995 (age 31)
- Place of birth: Yelets, Russia
- Height: 1.84 m (6 ft 1/2 in)
- Position: Midfielder

Team information
- Current team: FC Leningradets Leningrad Oblast
- Number: 5

Youth career
- –2007: FC Yelets
- 2008: Lokomotiv Yelets
- 2008–2009: Energiya Klyuch Zhizni
- 2009–2011: UOR Master-Saturn Yegoryevsk
- 2011: FC Krasnodar

Senior career*
Years	Team	Apps	(Gls)
2011–2015	FC Krasnodar	0	(0)
2013–2014	→ FC Krasnodar-2	20	(1)
2014–2015	→ FC Afips Afipsky (loan)	19	(1)
2015	FC Zenit-Izhevsk	0	(0)
2016	FC Rodina Moscow (amateur)		
2016–2017	FC Yelets (amateur)		
2018	DFK Dainava	14	(2)
2018–2019	FC Irtysh Omsk	18	(5)
2019	FC Tyumen	0	(0)
2019–2022	FC Irtysh Omsk	66	(6)
2022–2023	FC Volga Ulyanovsk	30	(2)
2023–2025	FC Neftekhimik Nizhnekamsk	51	(1)
2025–2026	FC Chernomorets Novorossiysk	30	(0)
2026–	FC Leningradets Leningrad Oblast	0	(0)

International career
2010	Russia U-16	9	(0)
2011	Russia U-17	2	(0)
- * Club domestic league appearances and goals as of 16 May 2026

Kirill Pavlovich Morozov (Russian: Кирилл Павлович Морозов; born 11 April 1995) is a Russian football player who plays for FC Leningradets Leningrad Oblast.

== Club career ==
He made his debut in the Russian Football National League for FC Irtysh Omsk on 1 August 2020 in a game against FC Yenisey Krasnoyarsk, as a starter.
