= Kirill Kosarev =

Russian footballer (born 2001)

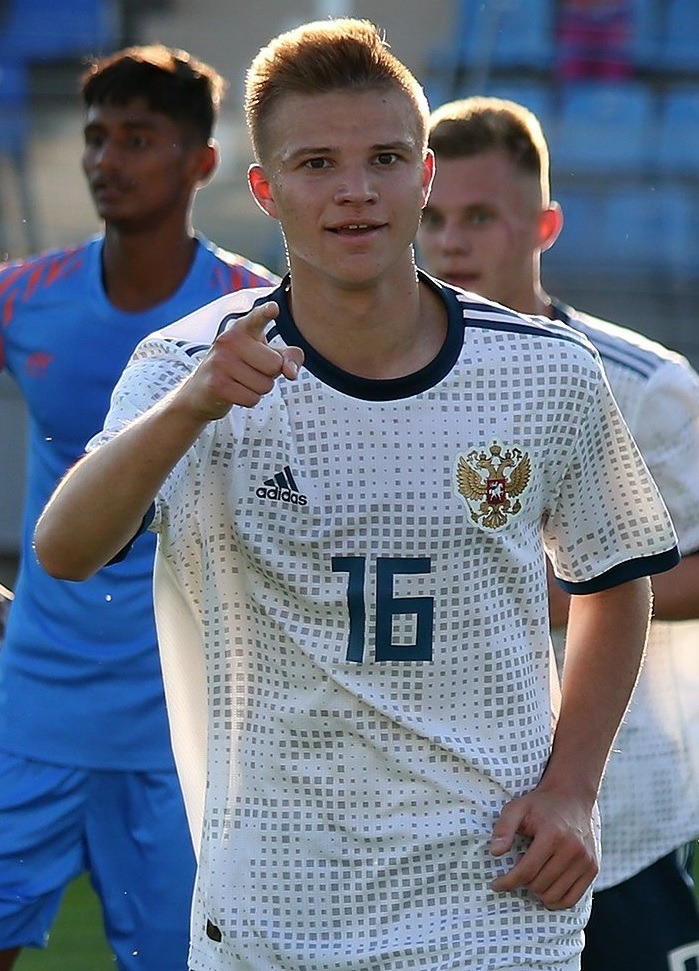
- Kosarev with Russia U19 in 2019

Personal information
- Full name: Kirill Andreyevich Kosarev
- Date of birth: 1 August 2001 (age 25)
- Place of birth: Samara, Russia
- Height: 1.79 m (5 ft 10 in)
- Position: Striker

Team information
- Current team: Zenit-2 Saint Petersburg
- Number: 91

Youth career
- Krylia Sovetov Samara

Senior career*
Years	Team	Apps	(Gls)
2017–2018	Krylia Sovetov-2 Samara	18	(1)
2018–2020	Murom	26	(5)
2019–2020	→ Zenit-2 Saint Petersburg (loan)	1	(0)
2020–2023	Rubin Kazan	6	(0)
2021	→ Tom Tomsk (loan)	16	(3)
2021	→ Hrvatski Dragovoljac (loan)	0	(0)
2021	→ Nizhny Novgorod (loan)	9	(1)
2022	→ Volgar Astrakhan (loan)	13	(1)
2023–2024	Volgar Astrakhan	29	(2)
2024–2025	Tyumen	9	(1)
2025	Saturn Ramenskoye	13	(4)
2025–	Zenit-2 Saint Petersburg	38	(23)

International career^{‡}
2018	Russia U17	5	(0)
2019	Russia U18	4	(3)
2019–2020	Russia U19	9	(4)
2021	Russia U21	2	(0)
- * Club domestic league appearances and goals as of 17 October 2026 ‡ National team caps and goals as of 6 June 2021

Kirill Andreyevich Kosarev (Russian: Кирилл Андреевич Косарев; born 1 August 2001) is a Russian football player who plays as a striker for Zenit-2 Saint Petersburg.

== Club career ==
On 24 June 2020, Kosarev signed a 4-year contract with Rubin Kazan.

Kosarev made his debut for Rubin Kazan on 16 September 2020 in a Russian Cup game against Chernomorets Novorossiysk. He made his Russian Premier League debut for Rubin on 31 October 2020 in a game against Arsenal Tula.

On 20 February 2021, he was loaned to Tom Tomsk until the end of the 2020–21 season.

On 28 July 2021, Kosarev joined Hrvatski Dragovoljac on loan for the 2021–22 season.

After playing in four friendlies for Hrvatski Dragovoljac, he was recalled from loan and on 20 August 2021 he joined Nizhny Novgorod on loan instead. He reunited with Aleksandr Kerzhakov, who was his manager at Tom Tomsk in the previous season. He scored his first Russian Premier League goal for Nizhny Novgorod on 7 November 2021 in a game against Akhmat Grozny.

On 22 February 2022, Kosarev was loaned to Volgar Astrakhan.

== Honours ==
Zenit-2 Saint Petersburg

- Russian Second League Division B: 2025
- Russian Second League Division A Silver Group: 2026

== Career statistics ==
As of 25 May 2024

Club	Season	League			Cup		Continental		Other		Total	
Club	Season	Division	Apps	Goals	Apps	Goals	Apps	Goals	Apps	Goals	Apps	Goals
Krylia Sovetov-2 Samara	2017–18	Russian Second League	18	1	–		–		–		18	1
Murom	2018–19	Russian Second League	21	3	1	0	–		5 (Note: Appearances in the FNL Cup)	0	27	3
Murom	2019–20	Russian Second League	5	2	2	1	–		–		7	3
Murom	Total		26	5	3	1	0	0	5	0	34	6
Zenit-2 Saint Petersburg (loan)	2019–20	Russian Second League	1	0	–		–		–		1	0
Rubin Kazan	2020–21	Russian Premier League	3	0	1	0	–		–		4	0
Rubin Kazan	2021–22	Russian Premier League	0	0	–		–		–		0	0
Rubin Kazan	2022–23	Russian First League	3	0	1	1	–		–		4	1
Rubin Kazan	Total		6	0	2	1	0	0	0	0	8	1
Tom Tomsk (loan)	2020–21	Russian First League	16	3	–		–		–		16	3
Nizhny Novgorod (loan)	2021–22	Russian Premier League	9	1	2	0	–		–		11	1
Volgar Astrakhan (loan)	2021–22	Russian First League	13	1	–		–		–		13	1
Volgar Astrakhan	2022–23	Russian First League	8	0	–		–		–		8	0
Volgar Astrakhan	2023–24	Russian First League	21	2	4	1	–		–		25	3
Volgar Astrakhan	Total		29	2	4	1	0	0	0	0	33	3
Career total			118	13	11	3	0	0	5	0	134	16
