= 2021–22 PFC Krylia Sovetov Samara season =

Krylya Sovetov
2021–22 season
- Owner: Samara Oblast
- Head coach: Igor Osinkin
- Stadium: Solidarnost Arena
- Premier League: 8th
- Russian Cup: Round of 32
- Top goalscorer: League: Vladislav Sarveli (9); All: Vladislav Sarveli (9)
- Highest home attendance: 32,314 vs Dynamo Moscow (6 May 2022)
- Lowest home attendance: 498 vs Khimki (6 November 2021)
- Average home league attendance: 7,207 (21 May 2022)
Home colours	Away colours
- All statistics correct as of 21 May 2022.

The 2021–22 season was the 64th season in the existence of PFC Krylia Sovetov Samara and the club's 19th consecutive season in the top flight of Russian football. In addition to the domestic league, PFC Krylia Sovetov Samara are participating in this season's editions of the Russian Cup.

== Players ==
Note: Flags indicate national team as defined under FIFA eligibility rules; some limited exceptions apply. Players may hold more than one non-FIFA nationality.

No.	Pos.	Nation	Player
1	GK	RUS	Ivan Lomayev
4	DF	RUS	Aleksandr Soldatenkov
5	DF	RUS	Yuri Gorshkov
6	MF	RUS	Denis Yakuba
8	MF	RUS	Maksim Vityugov
9	FW	RUS	Sergei Pinyayev
10	FW	RUS	Vladislav Sarveli
11	FW	RUS	Roman Yezhov
13	MF	RUS	Danil Lipovoy
14	MF	RUS	Aleksandr Kovalenko
15	MF	RUS	Maksim Glushenkov (on loan from Spartak Moscow)
17	FW	RUS	Anton Zinkovsky
19	FW	RUS	Dmitri Tsypchenko

No.	Pos.	Nation	Player
21	MF	UKR	Dmytro Ivanisenya
22	DF	BRA	Fernando Costanza
23	DF	NED	Glenn Bijl
39	GK	RUS	Yevgeny Frolov
44	DF	CRO	Mateo Barać (on loan from Sochi)
47	DF	RUS	Sergei Bozhin
52	MF	RUS	Danila Smirnov
66	DF	RUS	Yan Gudkov
77	MF	RUS	Artyom Sokolov
81	GK	RUS	Bogdan Ovsyannikov
85	FW	RUS	Ivan Ignatyev (on loan from Rubin Kazan)
95	DF	RUS	Ilya Gaponov (on loan from Spartak Moscow)
99	FW	RUS	Maksim Kanunnikov

=== Out on loan ===
Note: Flags indicate national team as defined under FIFA eligibility rules; some limited exceptions apply. Players may hold more than one non-FIFA nationality.

No.	Pos.	Nation	Player
—	GK	RUS	Nikita Yavorsky (at Chertanovo Moscow)
—	DF	RUS	Aleksei Nikitenkov (at Metallurg Lipetsk)
—	DF	BLR	Dmitry Prishchepa (at Veles Moscow)
—	MF	RUS	Leonid Gerchikov (at Metallurg Lipetsk)
—	MF	RUS	Ilya Gribakin (at Chertanovo Moscow)
—	MF	RUS	Nikita Pershin (at Chertanovo Moscow)

No.	Pos.	Nation	Player
—	MF	RUS	Nikita Saltykov (at Zvezda St. Petersburg)
—	MF	RUS	Vladislav Tyurin (at Tyumen)
—	MF	RUS	Dmitri Velikorodny (at Metallurg Lipetsk)
—	FW	RUS	Dmitri Molchanov (at Dynamo Bryansk)
—	FW	RUS	Yegor Pankov (at Chertanovo Moscow)
—	FW	RUS	Pavel Popov (at Chertanovo Moscow)

== Transfers ==
=== In ===
Date	Position	Nationality	Name	From	Fee	Ref.
23 June 2021	MF	(Russia)	Danil Lipovoy	Dynamo Moscow	Undisclosed	
6 July 2021	MF	(Ukraine)	Dmytro Ivanisenya	Zorya Luhansk	Undisclosed	
16 July 2021	MF	(Russia)	Danil Prutsev	Sochi	Undisclosed	
22 July 2021	DF	(Russia)	Kadyrgali Simbayev	Rubin Kazan	Undisclosed	
23 July 2021	FW	(Russia)	Sergei Pinyayev	Chertanovo Moscow	Undisclosed	
25 August 2021	DF	(Netherlands)	Glenn Bijl	Emmen	Undisclosed	
30 January 2022	DF	(Brazil)	Fernando Costanza	Sheriff Tiraspol	Undisclosed	
5 February 2022	GK	(Russia)	Nikita Yavorsky	Chertanovo Moscow	Undisclosed	
5 February 2022	DF	(Russia)	Yan Gudkov	Olimp-Dolgoprudny	Undisclosed	
5 February 2022	MF	(Russia)	Ilya Gribakin	Chertanovo Moscow	Undisclosed	
5 February 2022	MF	(Russia)	Nikita Pershin	Chertanovo Moscow	Undisclosed	
5 February 2022	MF	(Russia)	Nikita Saltykov	Zvezda St.Petersburg	Undisclosed	
5 February 2022	MF	(Russia)	Artyom Sokolov	Khimki	Undisclosed	
5 February 2022	FW	(Russia)	Aleksandr Kovalenko	Chertanovo Moscow	Undisclosed	
5 February 2022	FW	(Russia)	Yegor Pankov	Chertanovo Moscow	Undisclosed	
5 February 2022	FW	(Russia)	Pavel Popov	Chertanovo Moscow	Undisclosed	

=== Loans in ===
Date from	Position	Nationality	Name	From	Date to	Ref.
14 July 2021	FW	(Russia)	German Onugkha	Vejle	1 September 2021	
3 September 2021	DF	(Croatia)	Silvije Begić	Rubin Kazan	2 February 2022	
23 July 2021	MF	(Russia)	Maksim Glushenkov	Spartak Moscow	End of season	
2 February 2022	FW	(Russia)	Ivan Ignatyev	Rubin Kazan	End of season	
19 February 2022	DF	(Croatia)	Mateo Barać	Sochi	End of season	
22 February 2022	DF	(Russia)	Ilya Gaponov	Spartak Moscow	End of season	

=== Out ===
Date	Position	Nationality	Name	To	Fee	Ref.
13 July 2021	MF	(Portugal)	Ricardo Alves	Kairat	Undisclosed	
3 September 2021	MF	(Russia)	Stepan Sherstnyov	Nosta Novotroitsk	Undisclosed	
7 September 2021	DF	(Russia)	Kadyrgali Simbayev	Krasava	Undisclosed	
11 July 2021	MF	(Russia)	Vladislav Tyurin	Tyumen	Undisclosed	
21 January 2022	MF	(Russia)	Danil Prutsev	Spartak Moscow	Undisclosed	
22 February 2022	DF	(Russia)	Nikita Chernov	Spartak Moscow	Undisclosed	
10 January 2022	FW	(Russia)	Ivan Sergeyev	Zenit St.Petersburg	Undisclosed	
17 February 2022	DF	(Russia)	Anton Kiselyov	Salyut Belgorod	Undisclosed	

=== Loans out ===
Date from	Position	Nationality	Name	To	Date to	Ref.
11 July 2021	MF	(Russia)	Vladislav Tyurin	Tyumen	End of season	
20 July 2021	FW	(Russia)	Dmitri Molchanov	Dynamo Bryansk	End of season	
2 September 2021	DF	(Russia)	Maksim Karpov	Khimki	1 February 2022	
5 February 2022	GK	(Russia)	Nikita Yavorsky	Chertanovo Moscow	End of season	
5 February 2022	MF	(Russia)	Ilya Gribakin	Chertanovo Moscow	End of season	
5 February 2022	MF	(Russia)	Nikita Pershin	Chertanovo Moscow	End of season	
5 February 2022	MF	(Russia)	Nikita Saltykov	Zvezda St.Petersburg	End of season	
5 February 2022	FW	(Russia)	Yegor Pankov	Chertanovo Moscow	End of season	
5 February 2022	FW	(Russia)	Pavel Popov	Chertanovo Moscow	End of season	
16 February 2022	DF	(Russia)	Maksim Karpov	Metallurg Lipetsk	End of season	
17 February 2022	DF	(Russia)	Aleksei Nikitenkov	Metallurg Lipetsk	End of season	
17 February 2022	MF	(Russia)	Leonid Gerchikov	Metallurg Lipetsk	End of season	
17 February 2022	MF	(Russia)	Dmitri Velikorodny	Metallurg Lipetsk	End of season	
18 February 2022	DF	(Belarus)	Dmitry Prishchepa	Veles Moscow	End of season	

=== Released ===
Date	Position	Nationality	Name	Joined	Date	Ref.
9 May 2021	MF	(Moldova)	Alexandru Gațcan	Retired	29 July 2021	
5 June 2021	MF	(Russia)	Gennadi Kiselyov	Torpedo Moscow	6 July 2021	
13 June 2021	DF	(Russia)	Dmitri Kombarov	Retired		
13 June 2021	FW	(Russia)	Yegor Golenkov	Sigma Olomouc	31 August 2021	
30 June 2021	MF	(Russia)	Bakhadur Sokolov	Lada-Tolyatti	17 February 2022	
30 June 2021	FW	(Belarus)	Sergei Kornilenko	Retired		
1 July 2021	DF	(Russia)	Vladimir Poluyakhtov	Orenburg	7 July 2021	
25 July 2021	MF	(Russia)	Dmitry Yefremov	Akron Tolyatti	1 September 2021	
12 September 2021	MF	(Iraq)	Safaa Hadi	Al-Quwa Al-Jawiya		
13 December 2021	DF	(Algeria)	Mehdi Zeffane	Yeni Malatyaspor	14 January 2022	
31 December 2021	GK	(Russia)	Vladimir Krasilnikov			
31 December 2021	DF	(Russia)	Marat Aksanov			
31 December 2021	MF	(Russia)	Karim Aukhadeyev			
31 December 2021	MF	(Russia)	Artyom Bulgakov			
31 December 2021	MF	(Russia)	Klim Salmin			
31 December 2021	FW	(Russia)	Maksim Aronov			
31 December 2021	FW	(Russia)	Sergey Knyazkov			
21 January 2022	FW	(Kazakhstan)	Abat Aymbetov	Astana		
2 February 2022	FW	(Russia)	Dmitri Kabutov	Ufa	5 February 2022	

== Friendlies ==
26 March 2022	Rubin Kazan	0–5	Krylia Sovetov	Kazan
14:00 MSK (UTC+3)		Report

== Competitions ==
=== Overview ===
Competition	First match	Last match	Starting round	Final position	Record							
Competition	First match	Last match	Starting round	Final position	Pld	W	D	L	GF	GA	GD	Win %
Premier League	25 July 2021	21 May 2022	Matchday 1	8th	30	12	5	13	39	36	+3	40.00
Russian Cup	22 September 2022	27 October 2022	Round of 32	Round of 32	2	1	0	1	10	1	+9	50.00
Total					32	13	5	14	49	37	+12	40.63

Last updated: 21 May 2022
Source: Soccerway

=== Premier League ===
==== League table ====
Pos	Team	Pld	W	D	L	GF	GA	GD	Pts
6	Lokomotiv Moscow	30	13	9	8	43	39	+4	48
7	Akhmat Grozny	30	13	3	14	36	38	−2	42
8	Krylia Sovetov Samara	30	12	5	13	39	36	+3	41
9	Rostov	30	10	8	12	47	51	−4	38 (Note: Head-to-head points: Rostov 4, Spartak Moscow 1.)
10	Spartak Moscow	30	10	8	12	37	41	−4	38

Source: Premier Liga
Rules for classification: 1) Points; 2) Head-to-head points; 3) Head-to-head matches won; 4) Head-to-head goal difference; 5) Head-to-head goals scored; 6) Matches won; 7) Goal difference; 8) Goals scored; 9) 2020–21 position (not applicable to final standings); 10) Play-off.

==== Results summary ====
Overall								Home						Away					
Pld	W	D	L	GF	GA	GD	Pts	W	D	L	GF	GA	GD	W	D	L	GF	GA	GD
30	12	5	13	39	36	+3	41	7	3	5	24	14	+10	5	2	8	15	22	−7

Last updated: 21 May 2022.
Source: Soccerway

==== Results by round ====
Round	1	2	3	4	5	6	7	8	9	10	11	12	13	14	15	16	17	18	19	20	21	22	23	24	25	26	27	28	29	30
Ground	H	H	A	A	H	A	A	H	A	A	H	A	А	H	H	A	Н	Н	H	H	A	H	A	A	H	A	A	H	A	H
Result	L	L	L	D	W	W	L	W	L	W	W	L	W	W	D	D	L	W	D	D	W	L	L	W	W	L	L	W	L	L
Position	10	14	16	14	15	11	11	10	11	10	8	8	7	6	7	8	8	8	8	8	7	8	8	7	7	7	7	7	8	8

Updated to match(es) played on 21 May 2022. Source: Premier Liga
A = Away; H = Home; W = Win; D = Draw; L = Loss

==== Matches ====
25 July 2021 1	Krylia Sovetov	1 – 2	Akhmat Grozny	Samara
20:00 SAMT (UTC+4)	Sarveli 49'; Ivanisenya (yellow card) 54'; Prutsev (yellow card) 90+3'	Report	Utkin 6' (yellow card) 35'; Konaté 20'; Shvets (yellow card) 23'; Nižić (yellow card) 62'	Stadium: Solidarnost Arena; Attendance: 500; Referee: Kirill Levnikov

30 July 2021 2	Krylia Sovetov	0 – 1	Spartak Moscow	Samara
20:00 SAMT (UTC+4)	Gorshkov (yellow card) 47'; Bozhin (yellow card) 67'; Ivanisenya (yellow card) 90'	Report	Moses (yellow card) 58'; Bakayev (yellow card) 65'; Sobolev 68' (pen.)	Stadium: Solidarnost Arena; Attendance: 500; Referee: Pavel Kukuyan

7 August 2021 3	Arsenal Tula	2 – 1	Krylia Sovetov	Tula
18:30 SAMT (UTC+4)	Davitashvili 3'; Khlusevich 45+2'; Burlak (yellow card) 48'	Report	Sergeyev 49' (pen.); Soldatenkov (yellow card) 75'	Stadium: Arsenal Stadium; Attendance: 988; Referee: Evgeniy Kukulyak

15 August 2021 4	Rubin Kazan	1 – 1	Krylia Sovetov	Kazan
21:00 SAMT (UTC+4)	Samoshnikov (yellow card) 40'; Hwang 63' (yellow card) 90'; Abildgaard (yellow card) 77'; Begić (yellow card) 77'	Report	Sergeyev 59'; Lomayev (yellow card) 63'	Stadium: Ak Bars Arena; Attendance: 10,488; Referee: Alexey Sukhoi

21 August 2021 5	Krylia Sovetov	1 – 0	Sochi	Samara
21:00 SAMT (UTC+4)	Sergeyev 33'; Prutsev (yellow card) 39'	Report	Dzhanayev (yellow card) FT	Stadium: Solidarnost Arena; Attendance: 1,556; Referee: Anton Frolov

26 August 2021 6	Ufa	1 – 2	Krylia Sovetov	Ufa
17:30 SAMT (UTC+4)	Mrzljak (yellow card) 24'; Agalarov 61' (pen.) (yellow card) 77'	Report	Chernov 28'; Glushenkov 29'; Yezhov (red card) 60'	Stadium: BetBoom Arena; Attendance: 594; Referee: Vladislav Bezborodov

11 September 2021 7	Lokomotiv Moscow	2 – 0	Krylia Sovetov	Moscow
15:00 SAMT (UTC+4)	Tiknizyan (yellow card) 29'; Kamano 59', 79'; Zhivoglyadov (yellow card) 90+3'	Report	Chernov (yellow card) 64'; Yakuba (yellow card) 90+3'	Stadium: RZD Arena; Attendance: 2,559; Referee: Vasili Kazartsev

18 September 2021 8	Krylia Sovetov	4 – 2	Rostov	Samara
17:30 SAMT (UTC+4)	Gorshkov (yellow card) 6'; Bastos 44' (o.g.); Begić 51'; Glushenkov 58'; Ivanisenya (yellow card) 71'; Sarveli 90+'	Report	Komlichenko 23'; Glebov 69'; Sowe (yellow card) 80'	Stadium: Solidarnost Arena; Attendance: 998; Referee: Igor Panin

25 September 2021 9	Zenit St.Petersburg	2 – 1	Krylia Sovetov	Saint Petersburg
17:30 SAMT (UTC+4)	Kuzyayev (yellow card) 26'; Dzyuba 55'; Yerokhin (yellow card) 55'; Sutormin 79' (pen.)	Report	Zeffane (yellow card) 5'; Glushenkov (yellow card) 9'; Zinkovskiy 14', (yellow card) 78'; Sergeyev (yellow card) 71'; Soldatenkov (yellow card) 85'	Stadium: Krestovsky Stadium; Attendance: 13,471; Referee: Vitali Meshkov

2 October 2021 10	Dynamo Moscow	0 – 1	Krylia Sovetov	Moscow
17:30 SAMT (UTC+4)	Makarov (yellow card) 11'; Zakharyan (yellow card) 71'	Report	Yezhov 23'; Chernov (yellow card) 30'; Lomayev (yellow card) 65'; Yakuba (yellow card) 90+6'	Stadium: VTB Arena; Attendance: 7,437; Referee: Evgeny Kukulyak

17 October 2021 11	Krylia Sovetov	2 – 0	Nizhny Novgorod	Samara
17:30 SAMT (UTC+4)	Sarveli 36', 50'	Report	Suleymanov (yellow card) 58'; Gorbunov (yellow card) 72'; Kalinsky (penalty missed) 83'	Stadium: Solidarnost Arena; Attendance: 997; Referee: Aleksey Amelin

23 October 2021 12	CSKA Moscow	3 – 1	Krylia Sovetov	Moscow
20:00 SAMT (UTC+4)	Mukhin (yellow card) 6'; Ejuke 57'; Chalov 85'; Zabolotny 89'	Report	Sergeyev 11'; Prutsev (yellow card) 60'; Begić (yellow card) 73'	Stadium: VEB Arena; Attendance: 6,375; Referee: Vitali Meshkov

30 October 2021 13	Krasnodar	0 – 1	Krylia Sovetov	Krasnodar
20:00 SAMT (UTC+4)	Cabella (yellow card) 45+'; Ilyin (yellow card) 77'	Report	Ivanisenya (yellow card) 30' (yellow-red card) 88'; Sarveli 43'; Sergeyev (yellow card) 45'; Vityugov (yellow card) 89'	Stadium: Krasnodar Stadium; Attendance: 10,554; Referee: Evgeny Kukulyak

6 November 2021 14	Krylia Sovetov	3 – 0	Khimki	Samara
17:30 SAMT (UTC+4)	Vityugov (yellow card) 4'; Sarveli 20'; Sergeyev 39' (pen.); Gorshkov (yellow card) 67'; Yezhov 71'; Zeffane (yellow card) 87'	Report	Idowu (yellow card) 29'; Karpov (yellow card) 39'; Danilkin (yellow card) 45+1'; Filin (yellow card) 71'	Stadium: Solidarnost Arena; Attendance: 498; Referee: Artyom Lyubimov

20 November 2021 15	Krylia Sovetov	1 – 1	Ural Yekaterinburg	Samara
15:00 SAMT (UTC+4)	Ar.Mamin 59' (o.g.); Bijl (yellow card) 65'; Prutsev (yellow card) 72'; Ivanisenya (yellow card) 90+'	Report	Augustyniak (yellow card) 7'; Kolesnichenko (yellow card) 47'; Gagnidze (yellow card) 70'; Adamov (yellow card) 86'; Zheleznov 90'	Stadium: Solidarnost Arena; Attendance: 3,441; Referee: Kirill Levnikov

28 November 2021 16	Nizhny Novgorod	0 – 0	Krylia Sovetov	Nizhny Novgorod
15:00 SAMT (UTC+4)	Suleymanov (yellow card) 31'; Sharipov (yellow card) 64'	Report	Gorshkov (yellow card) 42'; Zinkovsky (yellow card) 58'	Stadium: Nizhny Novgorod Stadium; Attendance: 1,775; Referee: Vitaly Meshkov

4 December 2021 17	Krylia Sovetov	0 – 1	CSKA Moscow	Samara
15:00 SAMT (UTC+4)	Chernov (yellow card) 83'	Report	Mukhin (yellow card) 60'; Bohinen 75'; Ejuke (yellow card) 89'	Stadium: Solidarnost Arena; Attendance: 5,918; Referee: Vladimir Moskalyov

11 December 2021 18	Krylia Sovetov	2 – 0	Rubin Kazan	Samara
15:00 SAMT (UTC+4)	Sergeyev 62'; Pinyayev 85'	Report	Zuyev (yellow card) 56'	Stadium: Solidarnost Arena; Attendance: 4,598; Referee: Alexey Sukhoi

6 March 2022 20	Krylia Sovetov	2 – 2	Arsenal Tula	Samara
15:00 SAMT (UTC+4)	Bijl (yellow card) 44'; Sarveli 52'; Yezhov (yellow card) 78'; Ignatyev 83'	Report	K.Kangwa 13'; Stepanov (yellow card) 54'; Čaušić (yellow card) 61' (yellow-red card) 86'; Davitashvili (yellow card) 65'; Despotović 70' (pen.); Guliyev (yellow card) 77'; Kochenkov (yellow card) 88'; Sukhanov (yellow card) 90+2'}	Stadium: Solidarnost Arena; Attendance: 3,756; Referee: Pavel Shadykhanov

13 March 2022 21	Krylia Sovetov	1 – 1	Zenit St.Petersburg	Samara
16:30 SAMT (UTC+4)	Glushenkov (yellow card) 70'; Costanza (yellow card) 84'; Barać 90+'; Tsypchenko (yellow card) 90+'	Report	Claudinho (yellow card) 3'; Wendel (yellow card) 74' (yellow-red card) 90+'; Krugovoy 87'	Stadium: Solidarnost Arena; Attendance: 8,776; Referee: Anton Frolov

20 March 2022 22	Sochi	2 – 3	Krylia Sovetov	Sochi
17:30 SAMT (UTC+4)	Tsallagov (yellow card) 18'; Burmistrov (yellow card) 30'; Terekhov (yellow card) 52' (yellow-red card) 64'; Melkadze 80' (yellow card) 90+'; Makarchuk 83'	Report	Yakuba (yellow card) 39'; Glushenkov 45'; Barać (yellow card) 54'; Zinkovsky (yellow card) 68' (goal) 90+'; Gorshkov 78' (pen.); Bijl (yellow card) 83'	Stadium: Fisht Olympic Stadium; Attendance: 3,807; Referee: Artyom Lyubimov

2 April 2022 23	Krylia Sovetov	1 – 2	Ufa	Samara
15:00 SAMT (UTC+4)	Fernando (yellow card) 18' (goal) 68'; Bijl (yellow card) 80'	Report	Zhuravlyov 12'; Ortiz (yellow card) 55'; Nikitin (yellow card) 73'; Agalarov 87' (yellow card) 90+'	Stadium: Solidarnost Arena; Attendance: 7,927; Referee: Artyom Chistyakov

6 April 2022 19	Rostov	1 – 0	Krylia Sovetov	Rostov-on-Don
20:00 SAMT (UTC+4)	Komlichenko 18' (yellow card) 44'; Poloz (penalty missed) 28'; Silyanov (yellow card) 51'; Langovich (yellow card) 55'; Pesyakov (yellow card) 90+'	Report	Lomayev (yellow card) 25'; Sarveli (yellow card) 29'; Yezhov (yellow card) 35'; Glushenkov (yellow card) 74'	Stadium: Rostov Arena; Attendance: 8,604; Referee: Vasily Kazartsev
Note: Match postponed on 24 February.

10 April 2022 24	Ural Yekaterinburg	0 – 1	Krylia Sovetov	Yekaterinburg
13:00 SAMT (UTC+4)	Gerasimov (yellow card) 3' (yellow-red card) 84'; Magomadov (yellow card) 28'; Shatov (yellow card) 39'; Augustyniak (yellow card) 57'; Miškić (yellow card) 65'	Report	Bijl (yellow card) 23'; Zinkovsky 53'; Sarveli (yellow card) 76'	Stadium: Central Stadium; Attendance: 11,527; Referee: Kirill Levnikov

17 April 2022 25	Krylia Sovetov	2 – 0	Krasnodar	Samara
17:30 SAMT (UTC+4)	Sarveli 24'; Glushenkov 53'; Yezhov (yellow card) 62'	Report	Yakimov (yellow card) 35'; Krivtsov (yellow card) 44'; Litvinov (yellow card) 54'; Borodin (yellow card) 77'	Stadium: Solidarnost Arena; Attendance: 21,520; Referee: Sergei Karasev

24 April 2022 26	Khimki	4 – 1	Krylia Sovetov	Khimki
15:00 SAMT (UTC+4)	Nabiullin (yellow card) 27'; Glushakov 45+' (pen.); Mirzov 50'; Sadygov 87'; Soldatenkov 90' (o.g.)	Report	Glushenkov 28'; Yakuba (yellow card) 42' (yellow-red card) 45'; Soldatenkov (yellow card) 58'; Bijl (red card) 61'	Stadium: Arena Khimki; Attendance: 1,601; Referee: Aleksei Matyunin

1 May 2022 27	Spartak Moscow	2 – 1	Krylia Sovetov	Moscow
15:00 SAMT (UTC+4)	Gigot (yellow card) 8'; Dzhikiya (yellow card) 8'; Selikhov (yellow card) 42'; Sobolev 61' (pen.), 83'; Martins (yellow card) 66'	Report	Gorshkov 30' (pen.); Soldatenkov (yellow card) 60'; Fernando (yellow card) 77'	Stadium: Otkritie Arena; Attendance: 11,844; Referee: Evgeny Turbin

6 May 2022 28	Krylia Sovetov	5 – 2	Dynamo Moscow	Samara
19:00 SAMT (UTC+4)	Glushenkov 22', 71'; Sarveli 55'; Zinkovsky 80'; Pinyayev 90+'	Report	Moro (yellow card) 28'; Laxalt (yellow card) 35'; Balbuena 41'; Grulyov (yellow card) 55' (yellow-red card) 90+' (goal) 74'; Gladyshev (yellow card) 85'; Zakharyan (yellow card) 90'	Stadium: Solidarnost Arena; Attendance: 32,314; Referee: Vasili Kazartsev

14 May 2022 29	Akhmat Grozny	1 – 0	Krylia Sovetov	Grozny
20:00 SAMT (UTC+4)	Semyonov (yellow card) 21' (yellow-red card) 56'; Timofeyev (yellow card) 26'; Berisha (yellow card) 44'; Konaté 54'; Sheliya (yellow card) 90+'	Report	Fernando (yellow card) 31'; Gorshkov (penalty missed) 60'; Barać (yellow card) 90+'	Stadium: Akhmat-Arena; Attendance: 6,737; Referee: Alexey Amelin

21 May 2022 30	Krylia Sovetov	0 – 1	Lokomotiv Moscow	Samara
18:00 SAMT (UTC+4)	Lomayev (yellow card) 88'	Report	Zhemaletdinov 52'; Barinov (yellow card) 56'; Guilherme (yellow card) 70'; Kuchta (yellow card) 90+'; Miranchuk (yellow card) 90+'	Stadium: Metallurg Stadium; Attendance: 14,801; Referee: Vladislav Bezborodov
Note: Match held at the Metallurg Stadium, Samara, instead of Krylia Sovetov's regular Solidarnost Arena.

=== Russian Cup ===
==== Round of 32 ====
Pos	Team	Pld	W	D	L	GF	GA	GD	Pts	Qualification
1	Yenisey (Q)	2	2	0	0	5	0	+5	6	Advance to Play-off
2	Samara	2	1	0	1	10	1	+9	3	
3	Znamya Noginsk	2	0	0	2	0	14	−14	0	

Rules for classification: 1) Points; 2) Wins; 3) Goal differential; 4) Goals scored; 5) Head-to-head result; 6) Disciplinary points.
(Q) Qualified for the phase indicated

22 September 2021 2	Znamya Noginsk	0 – 10	Krylia Sovetov	Noginsk
15:00 SAMT (UTC+4)		Report	Prutsev (yellow card) 4'; Lipovoy 8'; Tsypchenko 20', 64', 71'; Pinyayev 22', 30'; Yakuba 77'; Sergeyev 83', 85'; Bijl 90'	Stadium: Istomkino Stadium; Referee: Inal Tanashev

27 October 2021 3	Yenisey Krasnoyarsk	1 – 0	Krylia Sovetov	Krasnoyarsk
15:00 SAMT (UTC+4)	Zotov (yellow card) 71'; Razdorskikh 83' (yellow card) 90'; Oparin (yellow card) 90+7'	Report	Bijl (yellow card) 38'; Tsypchenko (yellow card) 49' (yellow-red card) 79'	Stadium: Central Stadium; Referee: Artur Fedorov

== Squad statistics ==
As of match played 21 May 2022

=== Appearances and goals ===
No.	Pos	Nat	Player	Total		Premier League		Russian Cup	
No.	Pos	Nat	Player	Apps	Goals	Apps	Goals	Apps	Goals
1	GK	(Russia) RUS	Ivan Lomayev	28	0	28	0	0	0
4	DF	(Russia) RUS	Aleksandr Soldatenkov	24	0	21+1	0	1+1	0
5	DF	(Russia) RUS	Yuri Gorshkov	31	2	29	2	0+2	0
6	MF	(Russia) RUS	Denis Yakuba	21	1	13+7	0	0+1	1
8	DF	(Russia) RUS	Maksim Vityugov	23	0	6+15	0	2	0
9	FW	(Russia) RUS	Sergei Pinyayev	30	4	0+28	2	2	2
10	FW	(Russia) RUS	Vladislav Sarveli	30	9	24+5	9	1	0
11	MF	(Russia) RUS	Roman Yezhov	30	2	29+1	2	0	0
13	MF	(Russia) RUS	Danil Lipovoy	16	1	1+13	0	2	1
14	DF	(Russia) RUS	Aleksandr Kovalenko	12	0	5+7	0	0	0
15	MF	(Russia) RUS	Maksim Glushenkov	29	7	17+11	7	1	0
17	FW	(Russia) RUS	Anton Zinkovsky	32	4	30	4	0+2	0
19	FW	(Russia) RUS	Dmitri Tsypchenko	24	3	2+20	0	2	3
21	MF	(Ukraine) UKR	Dmytro Ivanisenya	17	0	15+1	0	0+1	0
22	DF	(Brazil) BRA	Fernando Costanza	9	1	9	1	0	0
23	DF	(Netherlands) NED	Glenn Bijl	23	1	18+3	0	2	1
44	DF	(Croatia) CRO	Mateo Barać	6	1	5+1	1	0	0
47	DF	(Russia) RUS	Sergei Bozhin	6	0	4+1	0	1	0
77	MF	(Russia) RUS	Artyom Sokolov	4	0	0+4	0	0	0
81	GK	(Russia) RUS	Bogdan Ovsyannikov	4	0	2	0	2	0
85	FW	(Russia) RUS	Ivan Ignatyev	5	1	1+4	1	0	0
95	DF	(Russia) RUS	Ilya Gaponov	6	0	6	0	0	0
Players away from the club on loan:
Players who appeared for Krylia Sovetov but left during the season:
2	DF	(Croatia) CRO	Silvije Begić	11	1	10	1	1	0
3	DF	(Russia) RUS	Nikita Chernov	17	1	14+1	1	1+1	0
7	FW	(Russia) RUS	Dmitri Kabutov	10	0	0+8	0	2	0
18	DF	(Algeria) ALG	Mehdi Zeffane	15	0	12+3	0	0	0
20	FW	(Russia) RUS	German Onugkha	4	0	1+3	0	0	0
25	MF	(Russia) RUS	Danil Prutsev	19	0	12+5	0	2	0
33	FW	(Russia) RUS	Ivan Sergeyev	20	8	16+2	6	0+2	2

=== Goal scorers ===
Place	Position	Nation	Number	Name	Premier League	Russian Cup	Total
1	FW	(Russia)	10	Vladislav Sarveli	9	0	9
1	FW	(Russia)	33	Ivan Sergeyev	6	2	8
3	MF	(Russia)	15	Maksim Glushenkov	7	0	7
4	MF	(Russia)	17	Anton Zinkovsky	4	0	4
4	FW	(Russia)	9	Sergei Pinyayev	2	2	4
6	FW	(Russia)	19	Dmitri Tsypchenko	0	3	3
7	MF	(Russia)	11	Roman Yezhov	2	0	2
7	DF	(Russia)	5	Yuri Gorshkov	2	0	2
7				Own goal	2	0	2
10	DF	(Russia)	3	Nikita Chernov	1	0	1
10	DF	(Croatia)	2	Silvije Begić	1	0	1
10	FW	(Russia)	85	Ivan Ignatyev	1	0	1
10	DF	(Croatia)	44	Mateo Barać	1	0	1
10	DF	(Brazil)	22	Fernando Costanza	1	0	1
10	MF	(Russia)	13	Danil Lipovoy	0	1	1
10	MF	(Russia)	6	Denis Yakuba	0	1	1
10	DF	(Netherlands)	23	Glenn Bijl	0	1	1
Total					39	10	49

=== Clean sheets ===
Place	Position	Nation	Number	Name	Premier League	Russian Cup	Total
1	GK	(Russia)	1	Ivan Lomayev	9	0	9
2	GK	(Russia)	81	Bogdan Ovsyannikov	0	1	1
Total					9	1	10

=== Disciplinary record ===
Number	Nation	Position	Name	Premier League		Russian Cup		Total	
Number	Nation	Position	Name	Yellow card	Red card	Yellow card	Red card	Yellow card	Red card
1	(Russia)	GK	Ivan Lomayev	4	0	0	0	4	0
4	(Russia)	DF	Aleksandr Soldatenkov	4	0	0	0	4	0
5	(Russia)	DF	Yuri Gorshkov	5	0	0	0	5	0
6	(Russia)	MF	Denis Yakuba	5	1	0	0	5	1
8	(Russia)	MF	Maksim Vityugov	2	0	0	0	2	0
10	(Russia)	FW	Vladislav Sarveli	2	0	0	0	2	0
11	(Russia)	FW	Roman Yezhov	3	1	0	0	3	1
15	(Russia)	MF	Maksim Glushenkov	3	0	0	0	3	0
17	(Russia)	FW	Anton Zinkovsky	3	0	0	0	3	0
19	(Russia)	FW	Dmitri Tsypchenko	1	0	2	1	3	1
21	(Ukraine)	MF	Dmytro Ivanisenya	6	1	0	0	6	1
22	(Brazil)	DF	Fernando Costanza	4	0	0	0	4	0
23	(Netherlands)	DF	Glenn Bijl	5	1	1	0	5	1
44	(Croatia)	DF	Mateo Barać	2	0	0	0	2	0
47	(Russia)	DF	Sergei Bozhin	1	0	0	0	1	0
Players away on loan:
Players who left Krylia Sovetov during the season:
2	(Croatia)	DF	Silvije Begić	1	0	0	0	1	0
3	(Russia)	DF	Nikita Chernov	3	0	0	0	3	0
18	(Algeria)	DF	Mehdi Zeffane	2	0	0	0	2	0
25	(Russia)	MF	Danil Prutsev	4	0	1	0	5	0
33	(Russia)	FW	Ivan Sergeyev	2	0	0	0	2	0
Total				62	4	4	1	66	5
