= 2021 Russian Cup final =

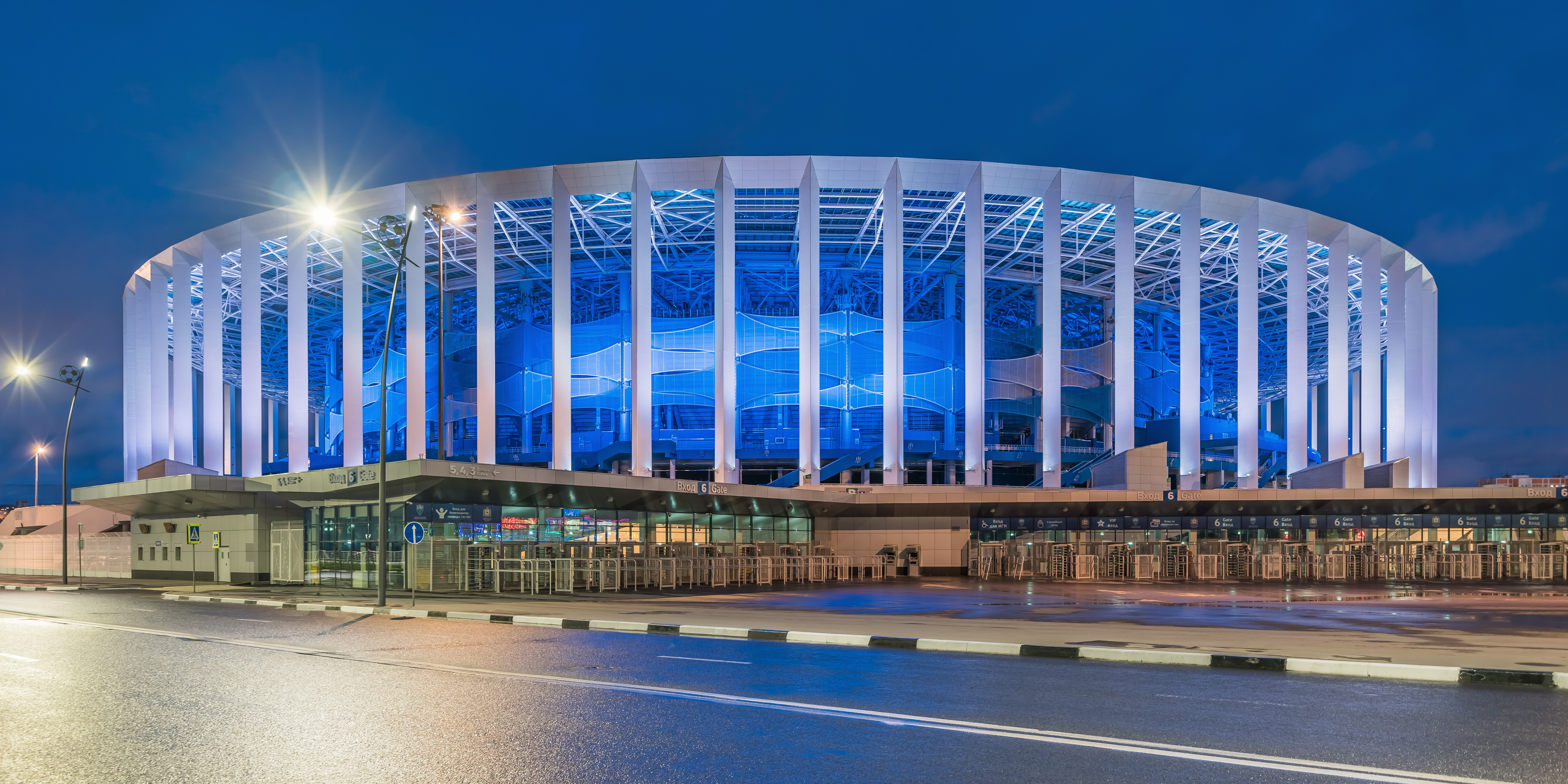
- Evening view of Nizhny Novgorod Stadium
- Event: 2020–21 Russian Cup
Lokomotiv Moscow	Krylia Sovetov Samara
3	1
- Date: 12 May 2021
- Venue: Nizhny Novgorod Stadium, Nizhny Novgorod
- Referee: Sergey Ivanov (Rostov-on-Don)
- Attendance: 20,800

The 2021 Russian Cup final was the 29th Russian Cup Final, the final match of the 2020–21 Russian Cup. It was played at Nizhny Novgorod Stadium in Nizhny Novgorod, Russia, on 12 May 2021, contested by FC Lokomotiv Moscow and Krylia Sovetov Samara. Lokomotiv won the match 3–1. It was the second occasion in a row in which a second-tier FNL club qualified for the final. Same as was the case in the previous final with Khimki, by the time the final was played, the FNL team already secured promotion into the Russian Premier League.

Because of the COVID-19 pandemic in Russia, attendance was limited to 50% of the arena's capacity.

Lokomotiv Moscow qualified for the 2021–22 UEFA Europa League by winning the cup.

== Route to the final ==
=== Lokomotiv Moscow ===
Round	Opposition	Score
Round of 16	Tambov (H)	3–0
QF	Sochi (A)	3–1
SF	CSKA Moscow (H)	3–0
Key: (H) = Home venue; (A) = Away venue; (N) = Neutral venue.

=== Krylia Sovetov Samara ===
Round	Opposition	Score
Elite group round	Dynamo Stavropol (A)	4–1
Elite group round	Rotor Volgograd (H)	3–0
Round of 16	Khimki (A)	4–0
QF	Dynamo Moscow (H)	2–0
SF	Akhmat Grozny (A)	0–0 (4–1 pen.)
Key: (H) = Home venue; (A) = Away venue; (N) = Neutral venue.

== Match ==
=== Details ===
12 May 2021
20:00 MSK

Lokomotiv Moscow	3–1	Krylia Sovetov Samara
Kamano 14'; Smolov 48' (pen.); Murilo 84'	Report	Sarveli 23'

Nizhny Novgorod Stadium, Nizhny Novgorod
Attendance: 20,800
Referee: Sergey Ivanov (Rostov-on-Don)

Lokomotiv Moscow	Krylia Sovetov Samara

GK	1	(Russia) Guilherme
DF	31	(Poland) Maciej Rybus	(yellow card) 90+'
DF	14	(Croatia) Vedran Ćorluka (c)		(substituted off) 76'
DF	3	(Brazil) Pablo	(yellow card) 50'
MF	6	(Russia) Dmitri Barinov		(substituted off) 46'
MF	17	(Russia) Rifat Zhemaletdinov		(substituted off) 76'
MF	94	(Russia) Dmitri Rybchinsky	(yellow card) 90'
MF	76	(Russia) Maksim Mukhin		(substituted off) 76'
MF	7	(Poland) Grzegorz Krychowiak
FW	9	(Russia) Fyodor Smolov		(substituted off) 87'
FW	25	(Guinea) François Kamano	(yellow card) 64'
Substitutes:
GK	77	(Russia) Anton Kochenkov
GK	60	(Russia) Andrey Savin
DF	2	(Russia) Dmitri Zhivoglyadov
DF	4	(Russia) Vitali Lystsov
DF	45	(Russia) Aleksandr Silyanov
DF	27	(Brazil) Murilo		(substituted in) 76'
MF	11	(Russia) Anton Miranchuk		(substituted in) 76'
MF	69	(Russia) Daniil Kulikov		(substituted in) 46'
MF	37	(Russia) Stanislav Magkeyev		(substituted in) 66'
MF	38	(Russia) Nikolai Titkov
FW	87	(Portugal) Eder		(substituted in) 87'
FW	88	(Belarus) Vitali Lisakovich
Manager:
(Serbia) Marko Nikolić

GK	1	(Russia) Ivan Lomayev
DF	47	(Russia) Sergei Bozhin (c)		(substituted off) 90'
DF	5	(Russia) Yuri Gorshkov
DF	4	(Russia) Aleksandr Soldatenkov
DF	18	(Algeria) Mehdi Zeffane		(substituted off) 79'
MF	17	(Russia) Anton Zinkovsky
MF	6	(Russia) Denis Yakuba	(yellow card) 16'	(substituted off) 44'
MF	16	(Portugal) Ricardo Alves
MF	11	(Russia) Roman Yezhov		(substituted off) 90'
FW	33	(Russia) Ivan Sergeyev
FW	10	(Russia) Vladislav Sarveli		(substituted off) 79'
Substitutes:
GK	39	(Russia) Yevgeny Frolov
GK	81	(Russia) Bogdan Ovsyannikov
DF	23	(Russia) Dmitri Kombarov
DF	2	(Russia) Vladimir Poluyakhtov
DF	3	(Russia) Nikita Chernov		(substituted in) 90'
DF	35	(Belarus) Dmitri Prischepa
MF	99	(Russia) Maksim Kanunnikov
MF	77	(Russia) Dmitri Kabutov		(substituted in) 79'
MF	22	(Russia) Dmitry Yefremov		(substituted in) 90'
MF	8	(Russia) Maksim Vityugov		(substituted in) 44'
MF	7	(Iraq) Safaa Hadi
FW	69	(Russia) Yegor Golenkov		(substituted in) 79'
Manager:
(Russia) Igor Osinkin

Man of the Match:

Assistant referees:
Valentin Murashov (Moscow)
Dmitri Zhvakin (Leningrad Oblast)
Fourth official:
Igor Panin (Dmitrov)
Back-up assistant:
Aram Petrosyan (Bronnitsy)
Inspector:
Nikolai Levnikov (Sochi)
VAR:
Vasili Kazartsev (St. Petersburg)
AVAR:
Anton Averyanov (Moscow)

Match rules

- 90 minutes
- 30 minutes of extra time if necessary
- Penalty shoot-out if scores still level
- Twelve named substitutes
- Maximum of five substitutions
