= Yan Gudkov =

Russian footballer (born 2002)

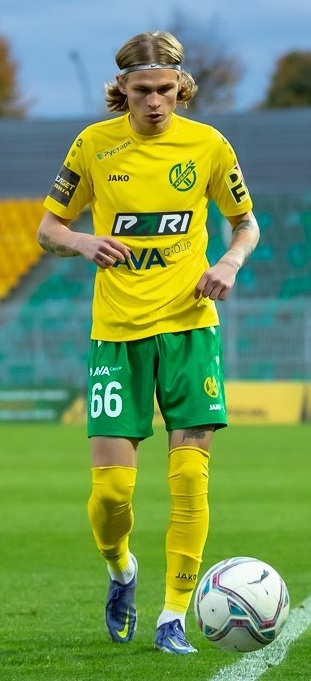
- Gudkov with Kuban Krasnodar in 2022

Personal information
- Full name: Yan Mikhailovich Gudkov
- Date of birth: 5 March 2002 (age 24)
- Place of birth: Saransk, Russia
- Height: 1.79 m (5 ft 10 in)
- Position: Left-back

Team information
- Current team: Nizhny Novgorod
- Number: 66

Youth career
- –2013: Mordovia
- 2013–2017: Chertanovo Education Center

Senior career*
Years	Team	Apps	(Gls)
2018–2019	Chertanovo-2 Moscow	3	(0)
2020–2021	Chertanovo Moscow	30	(0)
2021	Olimp-Dolgoprudny	22	(0)
2022–2024	Krylia Sovetov Samara	0	(0)
2022–2023	→ Kuban Krasnodar (loan)	9	(0)
2023	→ Tekstilshchik Ivanovo (loan)	10	(0)
2023–2024	→ Sokol Saratov (loan)	26	(0)
2024–2026	Chelyabinsk	64	(6)
2026–	Nizhny Novgorod	0	(0)
- * Club domestic league appearances and goals as of 16 May 2026

Yan Mikhailovich Gudkov (Russian: Ян Михайлович Гудков; born 5 March 2002) is a Russian football player who plays for Nizhny Novgorod.

== Club career ==
He made his debut in the Russian Football National League for Chertanovo Moscow on 22 August 2020 in a game against Neftekhimik Nizhnekamsk.

On 5 February 2022, Gudkov moved to Krylia Sovetov Samara. On 29 July 2022, he was loaned to Kuban Krasnodar. On 31 January 2023, Gudkov moved on a new loan to Tekstilshchik Ivanovo.

On 2 July 2023, Gudkov joined Sokol Saratov on loan.

== Career statistics ==
As of 21 May 2022

Club	Season	League			Cup		Continental		Other		Total	
Club	Season	Division	Apps	Goals	Apps	Goals	Apps	Goals	Apps	Goals	Apps	Goals
Chertanovo-2 Moscow	2018–19	PFL	3	0	–		–		–		3	0
Chertanovo Moscow	2019–20	FNL	0	0	0	0	–		1 (Note: Appearance in FNL Cup)	0	1	0
Chertanovo Moscow	2020–21	FNL	30	0	2	0	–		–		32	0
Chertanovo Moscow	Total		30	0	2	0	0	0	1	0	33	0
Olimp-Dolgoprudny	2021–22	FNL	22	0	1	0	–		–		23	0
Krylia Sovetov Samara	2021–22	RPL	0	0	–		–		–		0	0
Career total			55	0	3	0	0	0	1	0	59	0
