= Maksim Glushenkov =

Russian footballer (born 1999)

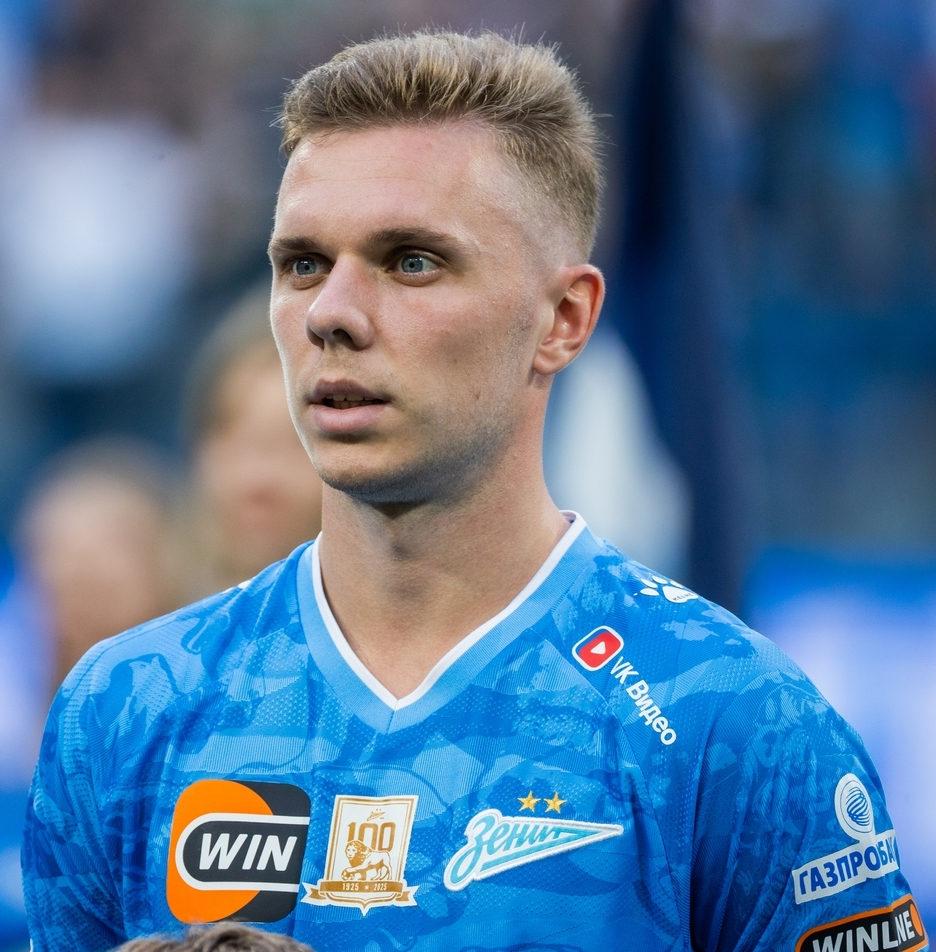
- Glushenkov with Zenit in 2025

Personal information
- Full name: Maksim Aleksandrovich Glushenkov
- Date of birth: 28 July 1999 (age 27)
- Place of birth: Smolensk, Russia
- Height: 1.79 m (5 ft 10 in)
- Positions: Right winger; centre forward

Team information
- Current team: Zenit Saint Petersburg
- Number: 10

Youth career
- 2004–2009: Dnepr Smolensk
- 2010–2013: Konoplyov football academy
- 2013–2014: Lokomotiv Moscow
- 2014–2016: Chertanovo Education Center

Senior career*
Years	Team	Apps	(Gls)
2016–2018	Chertanovo Moscow	65	(26)
2018	→ Chertanovo-2 Moscow	2	(2)
2019–2022	Spartak Moscow	11	(0)
2019	→ Spartak-2 Moscow	10	(6)
2020	→ Krylia Sovetov Samara (loan)	10	(3)
2021	→ Khimki (loan)	6	(2)
2021–2022	→ Krylia Sovetov Samara (loan)	28	(7)
2022	Krylia Sovetov Samara	16	(5)
2023–2024	Lokomotiv Moscow	42	(11)
2024–	Zenit Saint Petersburg	61	(28)

International career^{‡}
2017	Russia U18	12	(7)
2017	Russia U19	2	(0)
2017–2018	Russia U20	6	(5)
2019–2020	Russia U21	9	(2)
2022–	Russia	14	(4)
- * Club domestic league appearances and goals as of 21 November 2026 ‡ National team caps and goals as of 6 October 2026

Maksim Aleksandrovich Glushenkov (Russian: Максим Александрович Глушенков; born 28 July 1999) is a Russian professional footballer who plays for Zenit Saint Petersburg and the Russia national team. He plays as a right winger or centre forward.

== Club career ==
He made his debut in the Russian Professional Football League for Chertanovo Moscow on 29 July 2016 in a game against Kaluga. On 8 January 2019, Spartak Moscow officially announced that Glushenkov signed the contract with the club. He made his Russian Premier League debut for Spartak on 17 March 2019 in a game against Zenit Saint Petersburg. On 21 February 2020, he joined Krylia Sovetov Samara on loan until the end of the 2019–20 season.

On 2 February 2021, he was loaned to Khimki until the end of the 2020–21 season. On 23 July 2021, he was again loaned by Krylia Sovetov Samara until the end of the 2021–22 season. On 25 June 2022, Glushenkov returned to Krylia Sovetov on a permanent basis and signed a three-year contract. On 28 December 2022, Glushenkov signed a four-year contract with Lokomotiv Moscow.

On 20 June 2024, Glushenkov joined Zenit Saint Petersburg on a four-year contract with an option for a fifth year. On 13 July 2024, he scored twice, was selected man of the match and won his first trophy with Zenit in the 2024 Russian Super Cup game against Krasnodar. On his league debut for Zenit against Krylia Sovetov Samara a week later, he again scored twice and was named man of the match in a 4–0 victory.

On 3 August 2024, he scored the first hat-trick of his career in a 5–0 victory over Rostov, he scored 6 goals in his first 3 league games and 8 in his first 5 competitive games for Zenit. On 18 August 2024, in the fifth round match of the RPL against Khimki, he suffered a fracture of the radius bone of his right hand as a result of being hit by a ball and was forced to leave the field in the 24th minute. Shortly after recovering from the fracture, he suffered a hamstring injury, missing two months of games overall. He returned to the field in late November 2024.

On 27 September 2025, Glushenkov scored four goals in a game for the first time in his career in a 5–2 victory over Orenburg.

== International career ==
Glushenkov was called up to the Russia national football team for the first time for a friendly against Kyrgyzstan in September 2022. He made his debut in that game on 24 September 2022.

On 25 March 2025, Glushenkov scored a hat-trick in a 5–0 friendly victory over Zambia.

== Career statistics ==
=== Club ===
As of match played 21 November 2026

Appearances and goals by club, season and competition
Club	Season	League			Russian Cup		Other		Total	
Club	Season	Division	Apps	Goals	Apps	Goals	Apps	Goals	Apps	Goals
Chertanovo Moscow	2016–17	Russian Second League	21	7	1	0	5 (Note: Appearances in FNL Cup)	1	27	8
Chertanovo Moscow	2017–18	Russian Second League	23	8	2	1	5	0	30	9
Chertanovo Moscow	2018–19	Russian First League	21	11	1	0	—		22	11
Chertanovo Moscow	Total		65	26	4	1	10	1	79	28
Chertanovo-2 Moscow	2018–19	Russian Second League	2	2	—		—		2	2
Spartak Moscow	2018–19	Russian Premier League	5	0	0	0	—		5	0
Spartak Moscow	2019–20	Russian Premier League	1	0	0	0	—		1	0
Spartak Moscow	2020–21	Russian Premier League	5	0	0	0	—		5	0
Spartak Moscow	Total		11	0	0	0	—		11	0
Spartak-2 Moscow	2018–19	Russian First League	2	1	—		—		2	1
Spartak-2 Moscow	2019–20	Russian First League	8	5	—		—		8	5
Spartak-2 Moscow	Total		10	6	—		—		10	6
Krylia Sovetov Samara (loan)	2019–20	Russian Premier League	10	3	—		—		10	3
Khimki (loan)	2020–21	Russian Premier League	6	2	0	0	—		6	2
Krylia Sovetov Samara (loan)	2021–22	Russian Premier League	28	7	1	0	—		29	7
Krylia Sovetov Samara	2022–23	Russian Premier League	16	5	5	1	—		21	6
Lokomotiv Moscow	2022–23	Russian Premier League	13	5	3	0	—		16	5
Lokomotiv Moscow	2023–24	Russian Premier League	29	6	9	2	—		38	8
Lokomotiv Moscow	Total		42	11	12	2	—		54	13
Zenit Saint Petersburg	2024–25	Russian Premier League	20	9	5	0	1 (Note: Appearances in Russian Super Cup)	2	26	11
Zenit Saint Petersburg	2025–26	Russian Premier League	27	9	7	2	—		34	11
Zenit Saint Petersburg	2026–27	Russian Premier League	14	10	1	0	1	0	16	10
Zenit Saint Petersburg	Total		61	28	13	2	2	2	76	32
Career total			251	90	35	6	12	3	298	99

=== International ===
As of match played 6 October 2026

Appearances and goals by national team and year
National team	Year	Apps	Goals
Russia	2022	1	0
Russia	2023	–	
Russia	2024	–	
Russia	2025	7	3
Russia	2026	6	1
Total		14	4

Scores and results list Russia's goal tally first, score column indicates score after each Glushenkov goal.

List of international goals scored by Maksim Glushenkov
No.	Date	Venue	Opponent	Score	Result	Competition
1	25 March 2025	VTB Arena, Moscow, Russia	Zambia	1–0	5–0	Friendly
2	25 March 2025	VTB Arena, Moscow, Russia	Zambia	2–0	5–0	Friendly
3	25 March 2025	VTB Arena, Moscow, Russia	Zambia	4–0	5–0	Friendly
4	3 October 2026	Yekaterinburg Arena, Yekaterinburg, Russia	Namibia	4–0	6–0	Friendly

== Honours ==
Zenit Saint Petersburg

- Russian Premier League: 2025–26
- Russian Super Cup: 2024, 2026

Individual

- Russian Premier League top assist provider: 2023–24
- Russian Premier League player of the month: July/August 2024, September 2025, October 2026.
- Russian Premier League goal of the month: July/August 2024 (first goal against Rostov on 3 August), September 2025 (goal against Krasnodar on 21 September)
