= Dmitri Tsypchenko =

Russian footballer

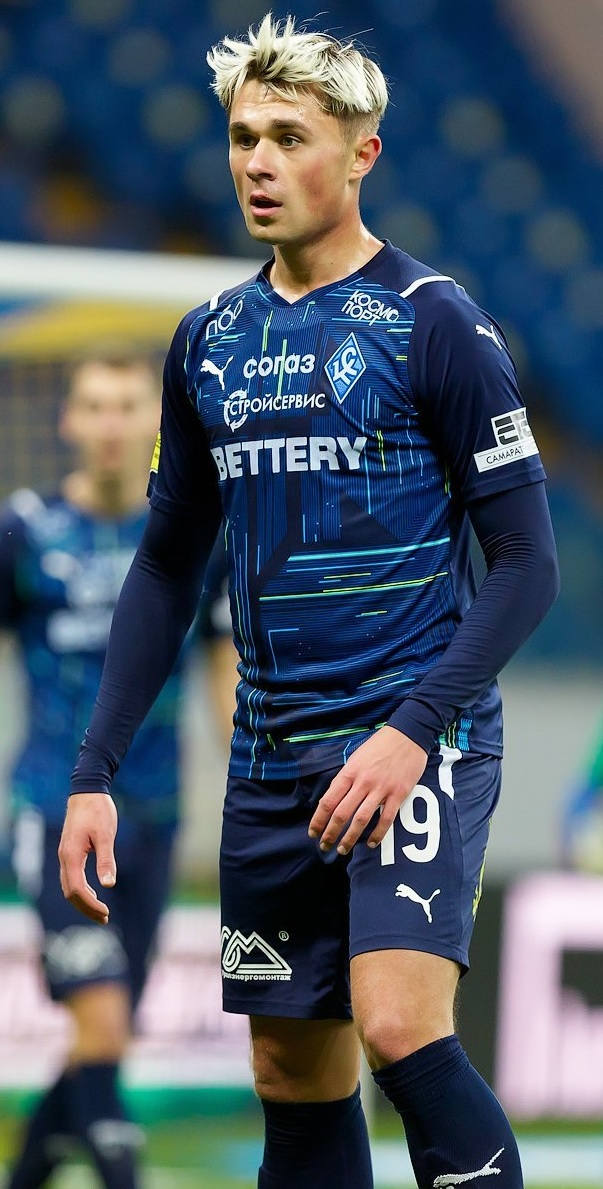
- Tsypchenko with Krylia Sovetov Samara in 2022

Personal information
- Full name: Dmitri Olegovich Tsypchenko
- Date of birth: 29 June 1999 (age 27)
- Place of birth: Voronezh, Russia
- Height: 1.84 m (6 ft 0 in)
- Position: Forward

Team information
- Current team: Torpedo Moscow
- Number: 10

Youth career
- –2015: Fakel Voronezh
- 2015–2016: Chertanovo

Senior career*
Years	Team	Apps	(Gls)
2016–2020	Chertanovo Moscow	75	(18)
2018–2019	→ Chertanovo-2 Moscow	5	(4)
2020–2025	Krylia Sovetov Samara	88	(6)
2025–2026	SKA-Khabarovsk	12	(5)
2026–	Torpedo Moscow	11	(3)

International career^{‡}
2016	Russia U17	1	(0)
2017	Russia U18	12	(4)
2017	Russia U19	5	(1)
2018	Russia U20	5	(1)
- * Club domestic league appearances and goals as of 16 May 2026 ‡ National team caps and goals as of 8 August 2018

Dmitri Olegovich Tsypchenko (Russian: Дмитрий Олегович Цыпченко; born 29 June 1999) is a Russian football player who plays as a centre forward for Torpedo Moscow.

== Club career ==
He made his debut in the Russian Professional Football League for Chertanovo Moscow on 29 July 2016 in a game against Kaluga. He made his Russian Football National League debut for Chertanovo on 17 July 2018 in a game against Rotor Volgograd.

He made his Russian Premier League debut for Krylia Sovetov Samara on 30 July 2021 in a game against Spartak Moscow.

== Career statistics ==
As of match played 18 May 2025

Appearances and goals by club, season and competition
Club	Season	League			Cup		Europe		Other		Total	
Club	Season	Division	Apps	Goals	Apps	Goals	Apps	Goals	Apps	Goals	Apps	Goals
Chertanovo Moscow	2016–17	Russian Second League	19	2	0	0	–		5 (Note: Appearances in the FNL Cup)	0	24	2
Chertanovo Moscow	2017–18	Russian Second League	17	7	1	1	–		5	0	23	8
Chertanovo Moscow	2018–19	Russian First League	23	4	1	0	–		3	1	27	5
Chertanovo Moscow	2019–20	Russian First League	16	5	1	1	–		1	0	18	6
Chertanovo Moscow	Total		75	18	3	2	0	0	14	1	92	21
Chertanovo-2 Moscow	2018–19	Russian Second League	5	4	–		–		–		5	4
Krylia Sovetov Samara	2020–21	Russian First League	25	2	4	3	–		–		29	5
Krylia Sovetov Samara	2021–22	Russian Premier League	22	0	2	3	–		–		24	3
Krylia Sovetov Samara	2022–23	Russian Premier League	24	3	7	4	–		–		31	7
Krylia Sovetov Samara	2023–24	Russian Premier League	1	0	0	0	–		–		1	0
Krylia Sovetov Samara	2024–25	Russian Premier League	16	1	4	1	—		—		20	2
Krylia Sovetov Samara	Total		89	6	17	11	—		—		105	17
Career total			168	28	20	13	0	0	14	1	202	42
