= Danil Prutsev =

Russian footballer

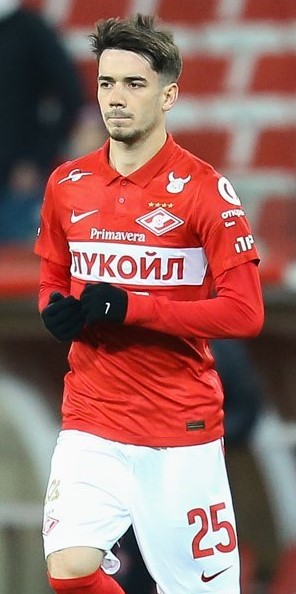
- Prutsev with Spartak Moscow in 2022

Personal information
- Full name: Danil Igorevich Prutsev
- Date of birth: 25 March 2000 (age 26)
- Place of birth: Mostovskoy, Krasnodar Krai, Russia
- Height: 1.74 m (5 ft 9 in)
- Position: Midfielder

Team information
- Current team: Spartak Moscow
- Number: 25

Youth career
- 2007–2008: Triumph Mostovskoy
- 2008–2012: Krasnodar
- 2012–2015: CSP Krasnodar
- 2015–2016: Chertanovo Education Center

Senior career*
Years	Team	Apps	(Gls)
2017–2020	Chertanovo Moscow	57	(2)
2018–2019	→ Chertanovo-2 Moscow	5	(0)
2020	Krylia Sovetov Samara	6	(0)
2020–2021	PFC Sochi	20	(0)
2021	Krylia Sovetov Samara	17	(0)
2022–	Spartak Moscow	90	(6)
2025–2026	→ Lokomotiv Moscow (loan)	24	(2)

International career^{‡}
2016	Russia U-16	2	(0)
2016–2017	Russia U-17	10	(2)
2017–2018	Russia U-18	10	(0)
2018–2019	Russia U-19	6	(0)
2021	Russia U-21	8	(0)
2023–	Russia	15	(3)
- * Club domestic league appearances and goals as of 22 November 2026 ‡ National team caps and goals as of 17 November 2026

Danil Igorevich Prutsev (Russian: Дани́л И́горевич Пру́цев; born 25 March 2000; some sources incorrectly list his first name as Daniil or Danila) is a Russian football player who plays as a central midfielder for Russian Premier League club Spartak Moscow and Russia national team.

== Club career ==
He made his debut in the Russian Professional Football League for FC Chertanovo Moscow on 3 August 2017 in a game against FC Dynamo-2 Saint Petersburg. He made his Russian Football National League debut for Chertanovo on 17 July 2018 in a game against FC Rotor Volgograd.

On 2 September 2020, he moved to Russian Premier League club PFC Sochi. He made his RPL debut for Sochi on 12 September 2020 in a game against FC Akhmat Grozny.

On 16 July 2021, he returned to PFC Krylia Sovetov Samara.

On 21 January 2022, Danil signed for Spartak Moscow with a contract until 2026. He scored his first goal in the Russian Premier League on 12 November 2022 in a 1-2 win against Lokomotiv Moscow.

On 28 August 2025, Danil moved on loan to Lokomotiv Moscow until the end of the 2025–26 season.

== International career ==
Prutsev was called up to the Russia national football team for the first time in March 2023 for a training camp. He made his debut on 23 March 2023 in a friendly against Iran.

== Personal life ==
His younger brother Yegor Prutsev is also a footballer.

== Career statistics ==
=== Club ===
As of match played 22 November 2026

Appearances and goals by club, season and competition
Club	Season	League			Cup		Other		Total	
Club	Season	Division	Apps	Goals	Apps	Goals	Apps	Goals	Apps	Goals
Chertanovo Moscow	2017–18	Russian Second League	13	1	1	0	2 (Note: Appearances in the FNL Cup)	0	16	1
Chertanovo Moscow	2018–19	Russian First League	18	1	0	0	4	0	22	1
Chertanovo Moscow	2019–20	Russian First League	26	0	2	0	5	0	33	0
Chertanovo Moscow	Total		57	2	3	0	11	0	71	2
Chertanovo-2 Moscow	2018–19	Russian Second League	5	0	—		—		5	0
Krylia Sovetov Samara	2020–21	Russian First League	6	0	1	0	—		7	0
Sochi	2020–21	Russian Premier League	20	0	2	0	—		22	0
Krylia Sovetov Samara	2021–22	Russian Premier League	17	0	2	0	—		19	0
Spartak Moscow	2021–22	Russian Premier League	5	0	4	0	—		9	0
Spartak Moscow	2022–23	Russian Premier League	27	1	10	1	1 (Note: Appearances in the Russian Super Cup)	0	38	2
Spartak Moscow	2023–24	Russian Premier League	23	1	11	1	—		34	2
Spartak Moscow	2024–25	Russian Premier League	19	1	11	0	—		30	1
Spartak Moscow	2025–26	Russian Premier League	1	0	3	0	—		4	0
Spartak Moscow	2026–27	Russian Premier League	15	3	4	0	1	0	20	3
Spartak Moscow	Total		90	6	43	2	2	0	135	8
Lokomotiv Moscow (loan)	2025–26	Russian Premier League	24	2	7	0	—		31	2
Career total			219	10	58	2	13	0	290	12

=== International ===
As of match played 17 November 2026

Appearances and goals by national team and year
National team	Year	Apps	Goals
Russia	2023	3	1
Russia	2024	2	0
Russia	2025	3	1
Russia	2026	7	1
Total		15	3

==== International goals ====
Scores and results list Russia's goal tally first.

No.	Date	Venue	Opponent	Score	Result	Competition
1	20 November 2023	Volgograd Arena, Volgograd, Russia	Cuba	6–0	8–0	Friendly
2.	19 March 2025	VTB Arena, Moscow, Russia	Grenada	1–0	5–0	Friendly
3.	3 October 2026	Yekaterinburg Arena, Yekaterinburg, Russia	Namibia	2–0	6–0	Friendly

== Honours ==
Krylia Sovetov Samara

- Russian First League: 2020–21

Spartak Moscow

- Russian Cup: 2021–22, 2025–26
