= Dmitri Velikorodny =

Russian footballer (born 2000)

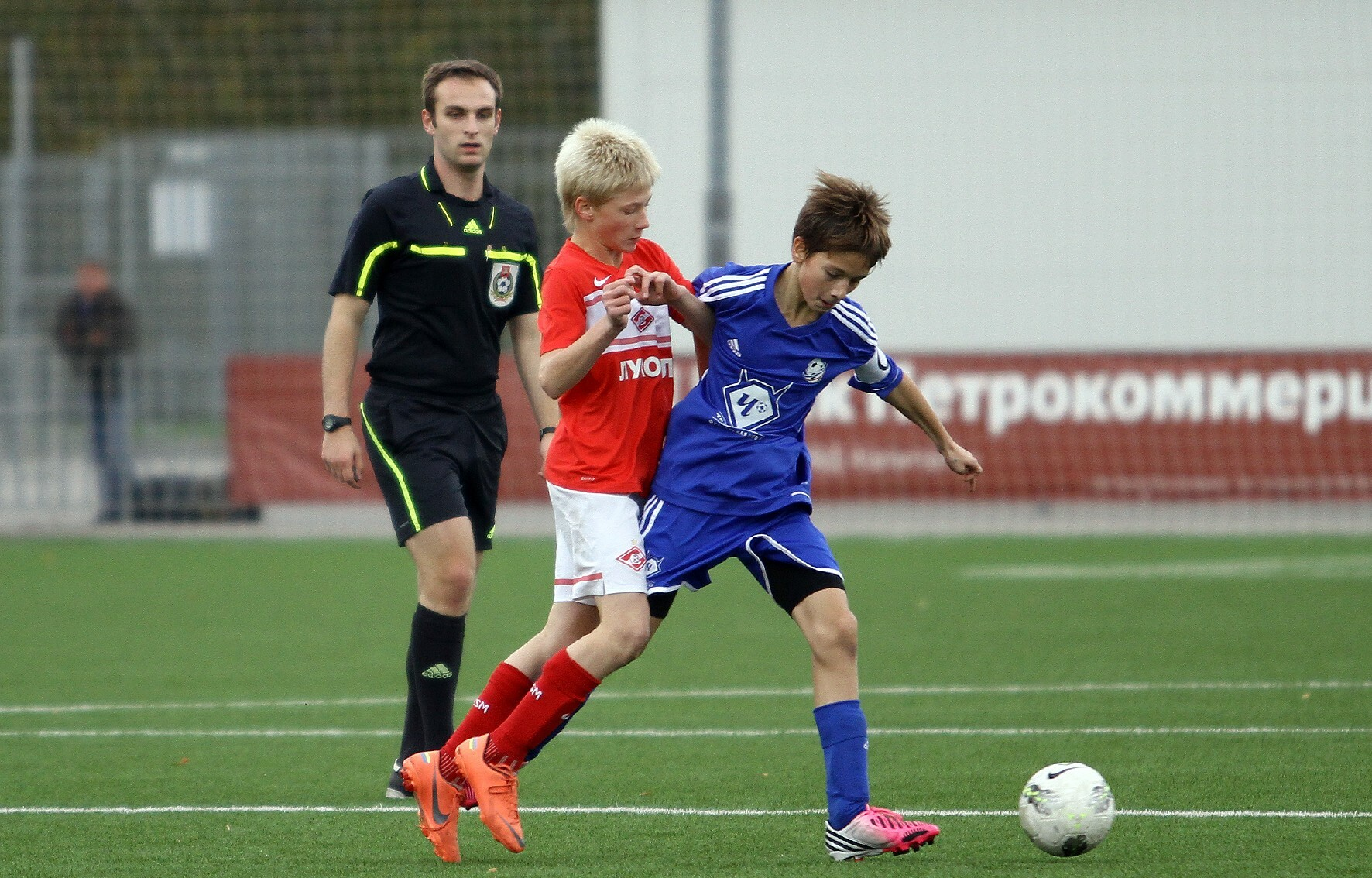
- Velikorodny (R) with Chertanovo academy in 2012

Personal information
- Full name: Dmitri Andreyevich Velikorodny
- Date of birth: 6 June 2000 (age 26)
- Place of birth: Stavropol, Russia
- Height: 1.80 m (5 ft 11 in)
- Position: Midfielder

Team information
- Current team: FC Bars
- Number: 26

Youth career
- –2016: Chertanovo Education Center

Senior career*
Years	Team	Apps	(Gls)
2016–2021	FC Chertanovo Moscow	34	(1)
2018–2019	→ FC Chertanovo-2 Moscow	14	(0)
2021	FC Olimp-Dolgoprudny	16	(0)
2022–2024	PFC Krylia Sovetov Samara	0	(0)
2022	→ FC Metallurg Lipetsk (loan)	12	(0)
2022–2023	→ FC Zvezda Saint Petersburg (loan)	13	(1)
2023	→ FC Novosibirsk (loan)	9	(0)
2023–2024	→ FC Chelyabinsk (loan)	17	(1)
2024–2025	FC Metallurg Lipetsk	33	(4)
2025–	FC Bars	10	(2)

International career^{‡}
2015–2016	Russia U16	9	(1)
2016–2017	Russia U17	10	(0)
2018	Russia U18	1	(0)
2018	Russia U19	7	(0)
- * Club domestic league appearances and goals as of 14 August 2025 ‡ National team caps and goals as of 13 November 2018

Dmitri Andreyevich Velikorodny (Russian: Дмитрий Андреевич Великородный; born 6 June 2000) is a Russian professional football player who plays for Kyrgyz club FC Bars.

== Club career ==
He made his debut in the Russian Professional Football League for FC Chertanovo Moscow on 14 April 2018 in a game against FC Znamya Truda Orekhovo-Zuyevo. He made his Russian Football National League debut for Chertanovo on 8 August 2018 in a game against FC Armavir.

On 5 February 2022, Velikorodny moved to Krylia Sovetov Samara. On 17 February 2022, Velikorodny was loaned by FC Metallurg Lipetsk.
