= Nikita Pershin =

Russian footballer (born 2002)

Personal information
- Full name: Nikita Fyodorovich Pershin
- Date of birth: 13 January 2002 (age 24)
- Place of birth: Kurchatov, Russia
- Height: 1.86 m (6 ft 1 in)
- Position: Midfielder

Team information
- Current team: FC Tekstilshchik Ivanovo (on loan from PFC Krylia Sovetov Samara)
- Number: 46

Youth career
- Energetik Kurchatov
- Chertanovo Education Center

Senior career*
Years	Team	Apps	(Gls)
2018–2019	FC Chertanovo-2 Moscow	16	(0)
2020–2021	FC Chertanovo Moscow	21	(0)
2022–	PFC Krylia Sovetov Samara	0	(0)
2022	→ FC Chertanovo Moscow (loan)	7	(1)
2022–2023	→ FC Zvezda Saint Petersburg (loan)	27	(3)
2023–2024	→ FC Chelyabinsk (loan)	30	(1)
2024–2025	→ FC SKA-Khabarovsk (loan)	28	(2)
2025–2026	→ FC Chelyabinsk (loan)	5	(1)
2026–	→ FC Tekstilshchik Ivanovo (loan)	0	(0)

International career^{‡}
2017	Russia U15	3	(0)
- * Club domestic league appearances and goals as of 16 May 2026 ‡ National team caps and goals as of 27 April 2017

Nikita Fyodorovich Pershin (Russian: Никита Фёдорович Першин; born 13 January 2002) is a Russian football player who plays for FC Tekstilshchik Ivanovo on loan from PFC Krylia Sovetov Samara.

== Club career ==
He made his debut in the Russian Football National League for FC Chertanovo Moscow on 1 August 2020 in a game against FC Spartak-2 Moscow, he substituted Nikita Suleymanov in the 81st minute.

On 5 February 2022, Pershin moved to Krylia Sovetov Samara.

On 12 July 2024, Pershin joined FC SKA-Khabarovsk on loan.

On 12 July 2026, Pershin was loaned by FC Tekstilshchik Ivanovo.
