= Vladislav Tyurin =

Russian footballer

Personal information
- Full name: Vladislav Vladimirovich Tyurin
- Date of birth: 18 April 2000 (age 26)
- Place of birth: Saratov, Russia
- Height: 1.75 m (5 ft 9 in)
- Position: Midfielder

Team information
- Current team: FC Saturn Ramenskoye
- Number: 13

Youth career
- –2013: Konoplyov football academy
- 2013–2017: FC Spartak Moscow

Senior career*
Years	Team	Apps	(Gls)
2018–2019	FC Arsenal Tula	0	(0)
2019–2023	PFC Krylia Sovetov Samara	5	(0)
2020–2021	→ FC Krylia Sovetov-2 Samara	17	(2)
2021–2023	→ FC Tyumen (loan)	36	(7)
2023–2024	FC Novosibirsk	36	(7)
2024–2025	FC Rotor Volgograd	22	(0)
2025–2026	FC Tekstilshchik Ivanovo	32	(1)
2026–	FC Saturn Ramenskoye	14	(5)
- * Club domestic league appearances and goals as of 31 October 2026

Vladislav Vladimirovich Tyurin (Russian: Владислав Владимирович Тюрин; born 18 April 2000) is a Russian football player who plays for FC Saturn Ramenskoye.

== Club career ==
He made his debut in the Russian Premier League for PFC Krylia Sovetov Samara on 7 July 2020 in a game against FC Arsenal Tula, replacing Anton Zinkovsky in the 84th minute.

On 11 July 2021, he joined FC Tyumen on loan.

On 11 July 2023, Tyurin signed with the Russian Second League club FC Novosibirsk.
