= Ilya Gribakin =

Russian footballer

Personal information
- Full name: Ilya Mikhailovich Gribakin
- Date of birth: 1 February 2004 (age 22)
- Height: 1.88 m (6 ft 2 in)
- Position: Midfielder

Team information
- Current team: Chelyabinsk
- Number: 27

Youth career
- Chertanovo Education Center

Senior career*
Years	Team	Apps	(Gls)
2020–2022	Chertanovo Moscow	2	(0)
2022–2026	Krylia Sovetov Samara	0	(0)
2022–2024	→ Chertanovo Moscow (loan)	44	(1)
2024–2026	Krylia Sovetov-2 Samara	55	(2)
2026–	Chelyabinsk	1	(0)

International career^{‡}
2018–2019	Russia U15	7	(0)
2019–2020	Russia U16	10	(1)
2021	Russia U17	2	(1)
2021	Russia U18	4	(0)
2023	Russia U19	3	(0)
2023	Russia U21	1	(0)
- * Club domestic league appearances and goals as of 5 September 2026 ‡ National team caps and goals as of 15 June 2023

Ilya Mikhailovich Gribakin (Russian: Илья Михайлович Грибакин; born 1 February 2004) is a Russian football player who plays for Chelyabinsk.

== Club career ==
He made his debut in the Russian Football National League for Chertanovo Moscow on 6 March 2021 in a game against Krylia Sovetov Samara.

On 5 February 2022, Gribakin moved to Krylia Sovetov Samara.

Gribakin made his first appearance for the senior team of Krylia Sovetov on 28 August 2024 in a Russian Cup game against Dynamo Moscow.

== Career statistics ==
As of 19 October 2025

Club	Season	League			Cup		Total	
Club	Season	Division	Apps	Goals	Apps	Goals	Apps	Goals
Chertanovo Moscow	2020–21	Russian First League	1	0	0	0	1	0
Chertanovo Moscow	2021–22	Russian Second League	1	0	0	0	1	0
Chertanovo Moscow	Total		2	0	0	0	2	0
Chertanovo Moscow (loan)	2021–22	Russian Second League	8	0	0	0	8	0
Chertanovo Moscow (loan)	2022–23	Russian Second League	25	1	1	0	26	1
Chertanovo Moscow (loan)	2023–24	Russian Second League A	11	0	0	0	11	0
Chertanovo Moscow (loan)	Total		44	1	1	0	45	1
Krylia Sovetov Samara	2023–24	Russian Premier League	0	0	—		0	0
Krylia Sovetov Samara	2024–25	Russian Premier League	0	0	3	0	3	0
Krylia Sovetov Samara	Total		0	0	3	0	3	0
Krylia Sovetov-2 Samara	2024	Russian Second League B	21	1	—		21	1
Krylia Sovetov-2 Samara	2025	Russian Second League B	19	1	—		19	1
Krylia Sovetov-2 Samara	Total		40	2	0	0	40	2
Career total			86	3	4	0	90	3
