= Aleksandr Soldatenkov =

Russian footballer (born 1996)

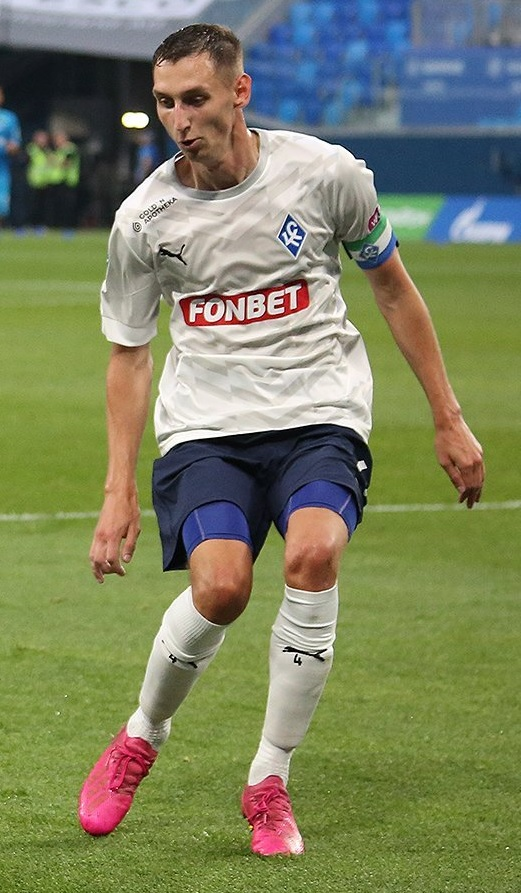
- Soldatenkov with Krylia Sovetov in 2022

Personal information
- Full name: Aleksandr Yevgenyevich Soldatenkov
- Date of birth: 28 December 1996 (age 29)
- Place of birth: Moscow, Russia
- Height: 1.89 m (6 ft 2 in)
- Position: Centre-back

Team information
- Current team: Sochi
- Number: 3

Youth career
- 2003–2014: Chertanovo Education Center

Senior career*
Years	Team	Apps	(Gls)
2014–2020	Chertanovo Moscow	155	(4)
2020–2025	Krylia Sovetov Samara	138	(4)
2025–	Sochi	22	(1)

International career^{‡}
2022–	Russia	6	(0)
- * Club domestic league appearances and goals as of 17 May 2026 ‡ National team caps and goals as of 19 March 2025

Aleksandr Yevgenyevich Soldatenkov (Russian: Александр Евгеньевич Солдатенков; born 28 December 1996) is a Russian football player who plays as a centre back for Sochi and the Russia national team.

== Club career ==
He made his professional debut in the Russian Professional Football League for FC Chertanovo Moscow on 14 July 2014 in a game against FC Metallurg Lipetsk. He made his Russian Football National League debut for Chertanovo on 17 July 2018 in a game against FC Rotor Volgograd.

He made his Russian Premier League debut for PFC Krylia Sovetov Samara on 25 July 2021 in a game against FC Akhmat Grozny.

On 10 January 2024, Soldatenkov extended his contract with Krylia Sovetov to June 2026.

On 11 September 2025, Soldatenkov signed a three-year contract with Sochi.

== International career ==
Soldatenkov was called up to the Russia national football team for the first time in November 2022 for friendly games against Tajikistan and Uzbekistan. He made his debut against Tajikistan on 17 November 2022.

== Career statistics ==
=== Club ===
As of match played 17 May 2026

Appearances and goals by club, season and competition
Club	Season	League			Cup		Other		Total	
Club	Season	Division	Apps	Goals	Apps	Goals	Apps	Goals	Apps	Goals
Chertanovo Moscow	2014–15	Russian Second League	24	0	—		—		24	0
Chertanovo Moscow	2015–16	Russian Second League	23	3	1	0	—		24	3
Chertanovo Moscow	2016–17	Russian Second League	21	0	1	0	5 (Note: Appearances in the FNL Cup)	0	27	0
Chertanovo Moscow	2017–18	Russian Second League	24	1	3	0	5	0	32	1
Chertanovo Moscow	2018–19	Russian First League	37	0	1	0	3	1	41	1
Chertanovo Moscow	2019–20	Russian First League	26	0	2	0	4	0	32	0
Chertanovo Moscow	Total		155	4	8	0	17	1	180	5
Krylia Sovetov Samara	2020–21	Russian First League	35	4	6	1	—		41	5
Krylia Sovetov Samara	2021–22	Russian Premier League	23	0	2	0	—		25	0
Krylia Sovetov Samara	2022–23	Russian Premier League	25	0	9	0	—		34	0
Krylia Sovetov Samara	2023–24	Russian Premier League	26	0	4	0	—		30	0
Krylia Sovetov Samara	2024–25	Russian Premier League	23	0	1	0	—		24	0
Krylia Sovetov Samara	2025–26	Russian Premier League	6	0	2	0	—		8	0
Krylia Sovetov Samara	Total		138	4	24	1	—		162	5
Sochi	2025–26	Russian Premier League	22	1	0	0	—		22	1
Career total			315	9	32	1	17	1	364	11

=== International ===
As of match played 19 March 2025

Appearances and goals by national team and year
National team	Year	Apps	Goals
Russia	2022	1	0
Russia	2023	2	0
Russia	2024	2	0
Russia	2025	1	0
Total		6	0
