= Mateo Barać =

Croatian footballer (born 1994)

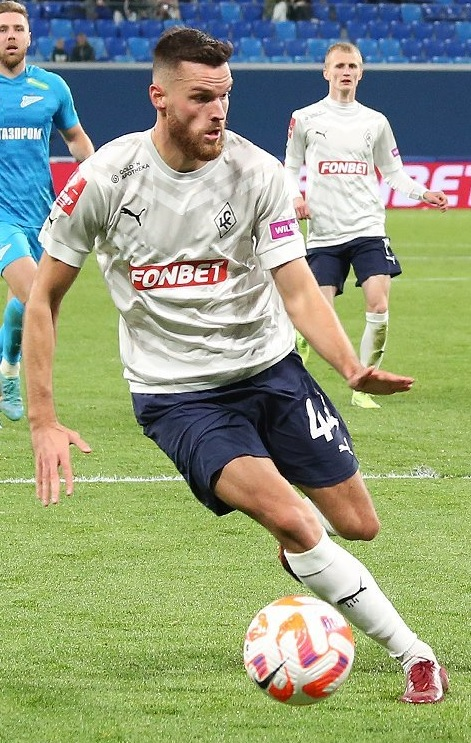
- Barać with Krylia Sovetov in 2022

Personal information
- Date of birth: 20 July 1994 (age 32)
- Place of birth: Sinj, Croatia
- Height: 1.94 m (6 ft 4 in)
- Position: Centre back

Team information
- Current team: Varaždin
- Number: 44

Youth career
- 2004–2011: Junak Sinj
- 2012–2013: Hajduk Split

Senior career*
Years	Team	Apps	(Gls)
2013–2014	Junak Sinj	31	(0)
2014	Wohlen	0	(0)
2014–2015	Hrvatski Dragovoljac	3	(0)
2015–2016	Šibenik	24	(3)
2016–2018	Osijek	50	(1)
2018–2021	Rapid Wien	57	(3)
2021–2022	Sochi	10	(0)
2022	→ Krylia Sovetov Samara (loan)	6	(1)
2022–2024	Krylia Sovetov Samara	14	(0)
2023	→ Oostende (loan)	6	(0)
2024–2025	Aktobe	16	(1)
2025–	Varaždin	18	(1)

International career^{‡}
2017–	Croatia	1	(0)
- * Club domestic league appearances and goals as of 15 June 2026 ‡ National team caps and goals as of 12 August 2017

Mateo Barać (Croatian pronunciation: [matěo bǎra:tɕ]; born 20 July 1994) is a Croatian football defender who plays for Varaždin.

== Club career ==
=== Early career ===
Born and raised in Sinj, Barać started his youth career at the local Junak Sinj. At the age of 17 he joined the Hajduk Split youth academy, winning the national U-19 championship with the club, but did not receive a professional contract at the end of his academy period, so he returned to third-tier Junak.

Following his first senior-level season playing in his hometown, he signed a three-year contract with the Swiss second-tier team FC Wohlen in July 2014, but his contract was rescinded the following month as Barać couldn't get a Swiss work permit.

Barać then moved back to Croatia, signing with second-tier Hrvatski Dragovoljac for the remainder of the season, but missed most of it due to injury.

=== NK Šibenik ===
Barać joined second-tier Šibenik in the summer of 2015, which was at the time coached by Mirko Labrović, his fellow native from Sinj, playing regularly and almost qualifying for the first tier.

=== Osijek ===
On 1 July 2016, Barać joined Osijek for an undisclosed fee. Impressive display in the first half of the Prva Liga earned him a call-up for Croatian A team for 2017 China Cup. On 3 August 2017, Osijek defeated the Dutch giants PSV Eindhoven in the third qualifying round of the 2017–18 UEFA Europa League with a 2–0 aggregate win. Many labeled Barać as the key member of the historic victory and Ajax eventually made a 2.5 million euros transfer bid. Osijek and Barać accepted, however the transfer was stopped due to Barać's heart issues revealed on the medical tests.

=== Rapid Wien ===
On 12 July 2018, he joined Rapid Wien for a fee of €1,300,000.

=== Sochi ===
On 19 June 2021, he moved to Russian club Sochi as a free agent.

=== Krylia Sovetov Samara ===
On 19 February 2022, he was loaned to Krylia Sovetov Samara until the end of the season with an option to buy.

On 31 May 2022, Barać moved to Krylia Sovetov on a permanent basis and signed a two-year contract.

==== Loan to Oostende ====
On 31 January 2023, Barać joined Oostende in Belgium on loan until the end of the season, with an option to buy.

=== Aktobe ===
On 9 February 2024, Krylia Sovetov announced Barać's transfer to Aktobe in Kazakhstan.

== Career statistics ==
=== Club ===
As of 31 October 2023

Club	Season	League			Cup		Continental		Other		Total	
Club	Season	Division	Apps	Goals	Apps	Goals	Apps	Goals	Apps	Goals	Apps	Goals
Hrvatski Dragovoljac	2014–15	Druga HNL	3	0	—		—		—		3	0
Šibenik	2015–16	Druga HNL	26	3	2	0	—		—		28	3
Osijek	2016–17	Prva HNL	24	1	4	0	—		—		28	1
Osijek	2017–18	Prva HNL	26	0	1	0	7 (Note: Appearances in UEFA Europa League)	0	—		34	0
Osijek	Total		50	1	5	0	7	0	—		62	1
Rapid Wien	2018–19	Austrian Bundesliga	12	0	4	0	9	0	—		25	0
Rapid Wien	2019–20	Austrian Bundesliga	18	3	2	1	—		—		20	4
Rapid Wien	2020–21	Austrian Bundesliga	27	0	2	0	6	0	—		35	0
Rapid Wien	Total		57	3	8	1	15	0	0	0	80	4
Rapid Wien II	2020–21	2. Liga	1	0	—		—		—		1	0
Sochi	2021–22	Russian Premier League	10	0	0	0	4 (Note: Appearances in UEFA Europa Conference League)	0	—		14	0
Krylia Sovetov Samara (loan)	2021–22	Russian Premier League	6	1	—		—		—		6	1
Krylia Sovetov Samara	2022–23	Russian Premier League	8	0	4	0	—		—		12	0
Krylia Sovetov Samara	2023–24	Russian Premier League	6	0	6	0	—		—		12	0
Krylia Sovetov Samara	Total		14	0	10	0	0	0	0	0	24	0
Oostende (loan)	2022–23	Belgian Pro League	6	0	0	0	—		—		6	0
Career total			173	8	25	1	26	0	0	0	224	9
