= Aleksei Nikitenkov =

Russian footballer

Personal information
- Full name: Aleksei Aleksandrovich Nikitenkov
- Date of birth: 6 January 2001 (age 25)
- Place of birth: Tolyatti, Russia
- Height: 1.88 m (6 ft 2 in)
- Position: Defender

Team information
- Current team: Tekstilshchik Ivanovo
- Number: 63

Senior career*
Years	Team	Apps	(Gls)
2017—2021	Chertanovo Moscow	24	(0)
2018—2019	→ Chertanovo-2 Moscow	16	(1)
2021	Olimp-Dolgoprudny	17	(0)
2022–2024	Krylia Sovetov Samara	0	(0)
2022	→ Metallurg Lipetsk (loan)	10	(1)
2022	→ Zvezda St. Petersburg (loan)	9	(1)
2023	→ Veles Moscow (loan)	5	(0)
2023–2024	→ Chelyabinsk (loan)	25	(1)
2024–2026	Chelyabinsk	30	(1)
2026	Chayka Peschanokopskoye	4	(0)
2026–	Tekstilshchik Ivanovo	0	(0)

International career^{‡}
2016	Russia U15	4	(1)
2016—2017	Russia U16	10	(0)
2017—2018	Russia U17	18	(0)
2018—2019	Russia U18	15	(0)
2019—2021	Russia U19	3	(0)
- * Club domestic league appearances and goals as of 16 May 2026 ‡ National team caps and goals as of 11 February 2020

Aleksei Aleksandrovich Nikitenkov (Russian: Алексей Александрович Никитенков; born 6 January 2001) is a Russian football player who plays for Tekstilshchik Ivanovo.

== Club career ==
Nikitenkov made his debut in the Russian Professional Football League for Chertanovo Moscow on 20 May 2018 in a game against Murom. He made his Russian Football National League debut for Chertanovo on 1 September 2018 in a game against Tyumen.

On 5 February 2022, Nikitenkov moved to Krylia Sovetov Samara. On 17 February 2022, Nikitenkov was loaned by Metallurg Lipetsk. On 20 January 2023, he moved on loan to Veles Moscow.
