= Denis Yakuba =

Russian footballer

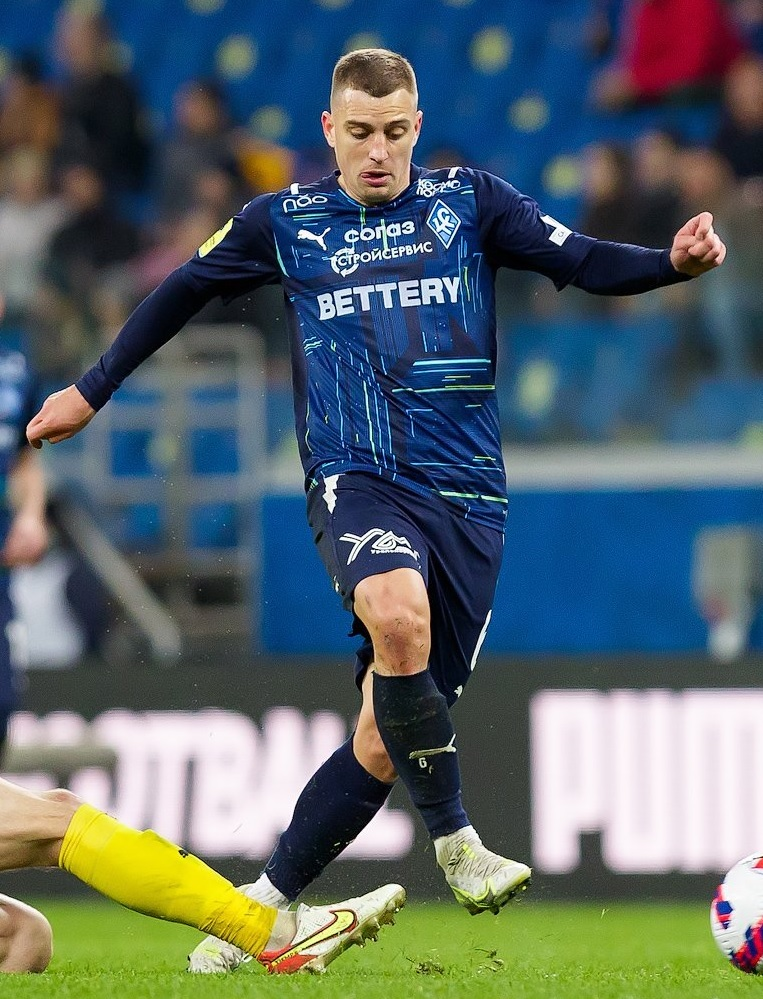
- Yakuba with Krylia Sovetov Samara in 2022

Personal information
- Full name: Denis Yevgenyevich Yakuba
- Date of birth: 26 May 1996 (age 30)
- Place of birth: Sotnikovskoye, Russia
- Height: 1.70 m (5 ft 7 in)
- Position: Defensive midfielder

Youth career
- Chertanovo Education Center

Senior career*
Years	Team	Apps	(Gls)
2014–2018	Kuban Krasnodar	44	(1)
2016–2017	→ Kuban-2 Krasnodar	5	(0)
2018–2019	Rotor Volgograd	15	(0)
2019–2025	Krylia Sovetov	65	(1)
2025–2026	Chayka Peschanokopskoye	1	(0)
2026	Dynamo Stavropol	9	(0)

International career^{‡}
2011	Russia U-15	1	(1)
2011–2012	Russia U-16	15	(0)
2012–2013	Russia U-17	19	(0)
2014	Russia U-18	4	(0)
2014–2015	Russia U-19	10	(0)
2015–2017	Russia U-21	9	(1)
- * Club domestic league appearances and goals as of 5 September 2026 ‡ National team caps and goals as of 28 March 2017

Denis Yevgenyevich Yakuba (Russian: Дени́с Евге́ньевич Яку́ба; born 26 May 1996) is a Russian football player who plays as a defensive midfielder.

== Club career ==
He was first moved to the senior squad of FC Kuban Krasnodar in March 2014. He made his debut for Kuban on 23 September 2015 in a Russian Cup game against FC Shinnik Yaroslavl. He started in the next Russian Cup round game against FC Spartak Moscow on 28 October 2015, which his team won 1–0 to advance to the quarterfinals. He made his Russian Premier League debut on 1 November 2015 against FC Lokomotiv Moscow.

On 9 July 2019, Russian Premier League club PFC Krylia Sovetov Samara confirmed that Yakuba will join the squad for the 2019–20 season.

== International ==
He won the 2013 UEFA European Under-17 Championship with Russia national under-17 football team, with which he also participated in the 2013 FIFA U-17 World Cup.

Later he represented Russia national under-19 football team at the 2015 UEFA European Under-19 Championship, where Russia came in second place and he was selected for the team of the tournament.

== Career statistics ==
As of match played 28 August 2024

Club	Season	League			Cup		Europe		Other		Total	
Club	Season	Division	Apps	Goals	Apps	Goals	Apps	Goals	Apps	Goals	Apps	Goals
Kuban Krasnodar	2013–14	RPL	0	0	0	0	0	0	–		0	0
Kuban Krasnodar	2014–15	RPL	0	0	0	0	–		–		0	0
Kuban Krasnodar	2015–16	RPL	13	0	2	0	–		2 (Note: Appearances in the relegation play-offs)	0	17	0
Kuban Krasnodar	2016–17	FNL	23	1	1	0	–		5 (Note: Appearances in the FNL Cup)	0	29	1
Kuban Krasnodar	2017–18	FNL	8	0	1	0	–		–		9	0
Kuban Krasnodar	Total		44	1	4	0	0	0	7	0	55	1
Kuban-2 Krasnodar	2016–17	PFL	5	0	–		–		–		5	0
Rotor Volgograd	2018–19	FNL	15	0	1	0	–		–		16	0
Krylia Sovetov Samara	2019–20	RPL	0	0	0	0	–		–		0	0
Krylia Sovetov Samara	2020–21	FNL	25	0	5	0	–		–		30	0
Krylia Sovetov Samara	2021–22	Russian Premier League	20	0	1	1	–		–		21	1
Krylia Sovetov Samara	2022–23	Russian Premier League	10	1	4	0	–		–		14	1
Krylia Sovetov Samara	2023–24	Russian Premier League	8	0	0	0	–		–		8	0
Krylia Sovetov Samara	2024–25	Russian Premier League	2	0	2	0	—		—		4	0
Krylia Sovetov Samara	Total		65	1	12	1	0	0	0	0	77	2
Career total			129	2	17	1	0	0	7	0	153	3
