= Roman Yezhov =

Russian footballer (born 1997)

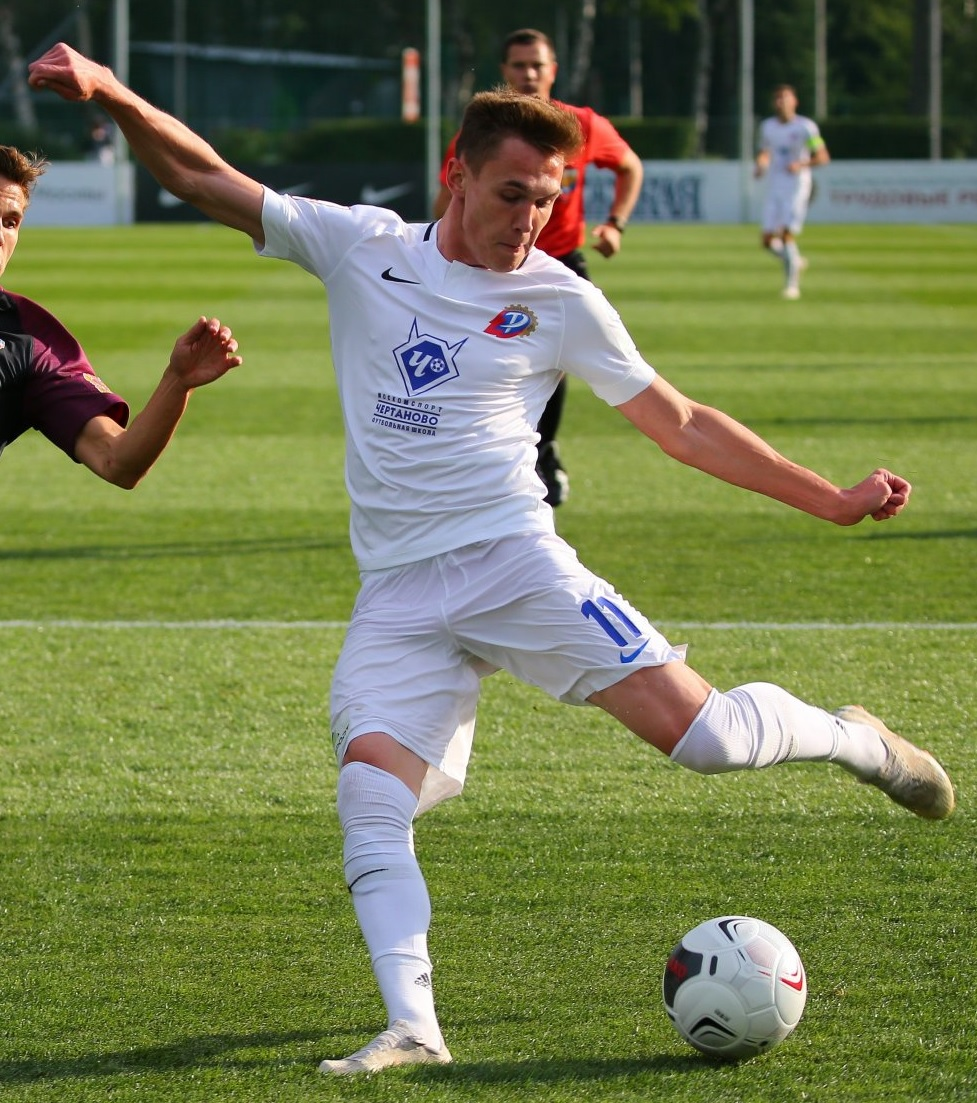
- Yezhov with Chertanovo Moscow in 2019

Personal information
- Full name: Roman Vladimirovich Yezhov
- Date of birth: 2 September 1997 (age 29)
- Place of birth: Nizhnekamsk, Russia
- Height: 1.81 m (5 ft 11 in)
- Position: Right winger

Team information
- Current team: Sochi
- Number: 29

Youth career
- 2004–2011: Neftekhimik Nizhnekamsk
- 2011–2014: Chertanovo Education Center

Senior career*
Years	Team	Apps	(Gls)
2014–2020	Chertanovo Moscow	130	(16)
2020–2025	Krylia Sovetov Samara	125	(12)
2025–	Sochi	18	(0)

International career^{‡}
2013	Russia U-16	3	(0)
2014	Russia U-17	3	(0)
2014	Russia U-18	2	(0)
2016	Russia U-19	3	(0)
2022–	Russia	1	(0)
- * Club domestic league appearances and goals as of 17 May 2026 ‡ National team caps and goals as of 24 September 2022

Roman Vladimirovich Yezhov (Russian: Роман Владимирович Ежов; born 2 September 1997) is a Russian professional footballer who plays as a right winger for Sochi.

== Club career ==
Yezhov made his professional debut in the Russian Professional Football League for FC Chertanovo Moscow on 29 September 2014 in a game against FC Fakel Voronezh. He made his Russian Football National League debut for Chertanovo on 17 July 2018 in a game against FC Rotor Volgograd.

He made his Russian Premier League debut for PFC Krylia Sovetov Samara on 25 July 2021 in a game against FC Akhmat Grozny.

On 9 July 2025, Yezhov signed a three-year contract with Sochi.

== International career ==
Yezhov was called up to the Russia national football team for the first time in October 2021 for the World Cup qualifiers against Cyprus and Croatia. He was included in the extended 41-players list of candidates. He made his debut on 24 September 2022 in a friendly game against Kyrgyzstan.

== Career statistics ==
=== Club ===
As of match played 17 May 2026

Appearances and goals by club, season and competition
Club	Season	League			Cup		Other		Total	
Club	Season	Division	Apps	Goals	Apps	Goals	Apps	Goals	Apps	Goals
Chertanovo Moscow	2014–15	Russian Second League	6	0	—		—		6	0
Chertanovo Moscow	2015–16	Russian Second League	22	1	1	0	—		23	1
Chertanovo Moscow	2016–17	Russian Second League	15	4	2	0	5 (Note: Appearances in the FNL Cup)	0	22	4
Chertanovo Moscow	2017–18	Russian Second League	26	2	2	0	5	0	33	2
Chertanovo Moscow	2018–19	Russian First League	36	8	0	0	5	0	41	8
Chertanovo Moscow	2019–20	Russian First League	25	1	2	0	4	1	31	2
Chertanovo Moscow	Total		130	16	7	0	19	1	156	17
Krylia Sovetov Samara	2020–21	Russian First League	35	4	7	1	—		42	5
Krylia Sovetov Samara	2021–22	Russian Premier League	30	2	0	0	—		30	2
Krylia Sovetov Samara	2022–23	Russian Premier League	22	3	5	0	—		27	3
Krylia Sovetov Samara	2023–24	Russian Premier League	17	3	3	0	—		20	3
Krylia Sovetov Samara	2024–25	Russian Premier League	21	0	2	0	—		23	0
Krylia Sovetov Samara	Total		125	12	17	1	—		142	13
Sochi	2025–26	Russian Premier League	18	0	3	0	—		21	0
Career total			273	28	27	1	19	1	319	30

=== International ===
As of match played 24 September 2022

Appearances and goals by national team and year
National team	Year	Apps	Goals
Russia	2022	1	0
Total		1	0
