= Yuri Gorshkov =

Russian footballer

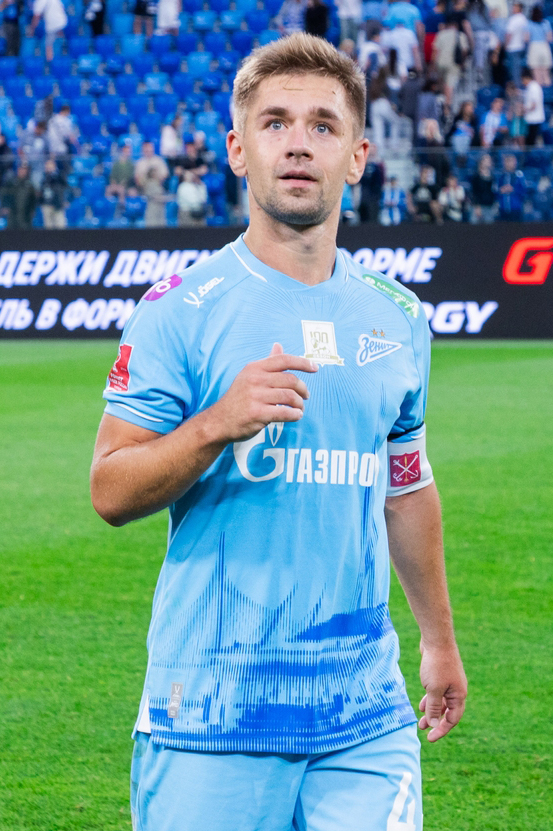
- Gorshkov with Zenit in 2025

Personal information
- Full name: Yuri Aleksandrovich Gorshkov
- Date of birth: 13 March 1999 (age 27)
- Place of birth: Kondopoga, Russia
- Height: 1.74 m (5 ft 9 in)
- Position: Left-back

Team information
- Current team: Krylia Sovetov Samara
- Number: 4

Youth career
- Kondopoga Sport School
- 2011–2016: Chertanovo Moscow

Senior career*
Years	Team	Apps	(Gls)
2016–2020	Chertanovo Moscow	95	(3)
2020–2024	Krylia Sovetov Samara	123	(9)
2024–2026	Zenit Saint Petersburg	22	(1)
2026–	Krylia Sovetov Samara	12	(0)

International career^{‡}
2017	Russia U18	11	(0)
2017	Russia U19	3	(0)
2023–	Russia	9	(0)
- * Club domestic league appearances and goals as of 20 November 2026 ‡ National team caps and goals as of 19:03, 5 October 2026 (UTC)

Yuri Aleksandrovich Gorshkov (Russian: Юрий Александрович Горшков; born 13 March 1999) is a Russian professional footballer who plays as a left-back for Krylia Sovetov Samara and the Russia national team.

== Club career ==
Gorshkov made his debut in the Russian Professional Football League for Chertanovo Moscow on 18 August 2016 in a game against Energomash Belgorod. He made his Russian Football National League debut for Chertanovo on 17 July 2018 in a game against Rotor Volgograd.

Gorshkov made his Russian Premier League debut for Krylia Sovetov Samara on 25 July 2021 in a game against Akhmat Grozny.

On 24 June 2024, Gorshkov signed a contract with Zenit Saint Petersburg for three seasons, with an optional fourth.

On 15 August 2026, Gorshkov returned to Krylia Sovetov Samara with a three-year contract.

== International career ==
Gorshkov was called up to the Russia national football team for the first time in October 2023 for friendlies. He made his debut on 16 October 2023 in a friendly against Kenya.

== Career statistics ==
=== Club ===
As of match played 20 November 2026

Appearances and goals by club, season and competition
Club	Season	League			Cup		Other		Total	
Club	Season	Division	Apps	Goals	Apps	Goals	Apps	Goals	Apps	Goals
Chertanovo Moscow	2016–17	Russian Second League	15	0	0	0	5 (Note: Appearances in the FNL Cup)	0	20	0
Chertanovo Moscow	2017–18	Russian Second League	22	1	3	1	5	0	30	2
Chertanovo Moscow	2018–19	Russian First League	36	2	1	0	5	0	42	2
Chertanovo Moscow	2019–20	Russian First League	22	0	1	0	4	1	27	1
Chertanovo Moscow	Total		95	3	5	1	19	1	119	5
Chertanovo-2 Moscow	2018–19	Russian Second League	1	0	—		—		1	0
Krylia Sovetov Samara	2020–21	Russian First League	41	3	7	0	—		48	3
Krylia Sovetov Samara	2021–22	Russian Premier League	29	2	2	0	—		31	2
Krylia Sovetov Samara	2022–23	Russian Premier League	24	0	10	0	—		34	0
Krylia Sovetov Samara	2023–24	Russian Premier League	29	4	5	0	—		34	4
Krylia Sovetov Samara	Total		123	9	24	0	—		147	9
Zenit Saint Petersburg	2024–25	Russian Premier League	15	0	10	0	1 (Note: Appearance in Russian Super Cup)	0	26	0
Zenit Saint Petersburg	2025–26	Russian Premier League	7	1	9	1	—		16	2
Zenit Saint Petersburg	2026–27	Russian Premier League	0	0	1	0	—		1	0
Zenit Saint Petersburg	Total		22	1	20	1	1	0	43	2
Krylia Sovetov Samara	2026–27	Russian Premier League	12	0	3	0	—		15	0
Krylia Sovetov Samara	Club total		135	9	27	0	—		162	9
Career total			253	13	52	2	20	1	325	16

=== International ===
As of match played 12 November 2025

Appearances and goals by national team and year
National team	Year	Apps	Goals
Russia	2023	1	0
Russia	2024	3	0
Russia	2025	5	0
Total		9	0

== Honours ==
Zenit Saint Petersburg

- Russian Premier League: 2025–26
- Russian Super Cup: 2024, 2026
