= Ivan Lomayev =

Russian footballer

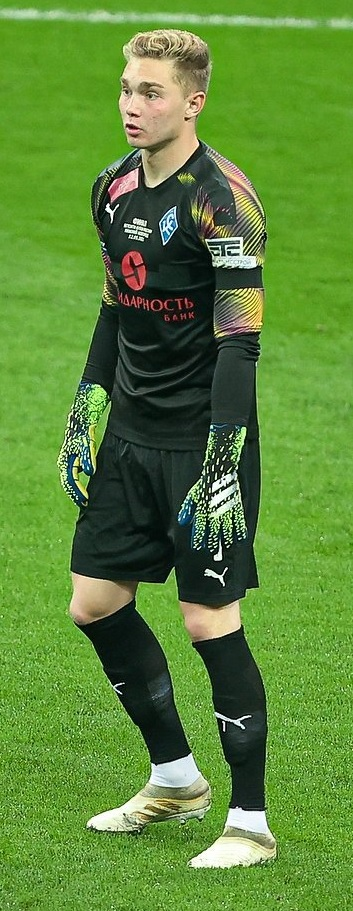
- Lomayev with Krylia Sovetov in 2021

Personal information
- Full name: Ivan Dmitriyevich Lomayev
- Date of birth: 21 January 1999 (age 27)
- Place of birth: Guryevsk, Kemerovo Oblast, Russia
- Height: 1.90 m (6 ft 3 in)
- Position: Goalkeeper

Team information
- Current team: Chelyabinsk
- Number: 1

Youth career
- 2009–2011: Kemerovo Sport School
- 2011–2014: Konoplyov football academy
- 2014–2015: Chertanovo Moscow

Senior career*
Years	Team	Apps	(Gls)
2015–2020	Chertanovo Moscow	72	(0)
2020–2025	Krylia Sovetov Samara	100	(0)
2025–2026	Sochi	1	(0)
2026	Ufa	0	(0)
2026–	Chelyabinsk	0	(0)

International career^{‡}
2016	Russia U17	1	(0)
2016–2017	Russia U18	12	(0)
2017	Russia U19	3	(0)
2019	Russia U21	1	(0)
- * Club domestic league appearances and goals as of 16 May 2026 ‡ National team caps and goals as of 25 March 2019

Ivan Dmitriyevich Lomayev (Russian: Иван Дмитриевич Ломаев; born 21 January 1999) is a Russian football player who plays as a goalkeeper for Chelyabinsk.

== Club career ==
He made his debut in the Russian Professional Football League for Chertanovo Moscow on 30 May 2016 in a game against Lokomotiv Liski. He made his Russian Football National League debut for Chertanovo on 17 July 2018 in a game against Rotor Volgograd.

He made his Russian Premier League debut for Krylia Sovetov Samara on 25 July 2021 in a game against Akhmat Grozny.

Lomayev left Krylia Sovetov on 25 June 2025.

On 11 September 2025, Lomayev signed a one-season contract with Sochi. On 12 January 2026, his Sochi contract was mutually terminated.

== International career ==
Lomayev was called up to the Russia national football team for the first time for a friendly against Kyrgyzstan in September 2022.

== Career statistics ==
As of match played 21 November 2025

Club	Season	League			Cup		Europe		Other		Total	
Club	Season	Division	Apps	Goals	Apps	Goals	Apps	Goals	Apps	Goals	Apps	Goals
Chertanovo Moscow	2015–16	Russian Second League	1	0	0	0	—		—		1	0
Chertanovo Moscow	2016–17	Russian Second League	15	0	0	0	—		3 (Note: Appearances in the FNL Cup)	0	18	0
Chertanovo Moscow	2017–18	Russian Second League	20	0	1	0	—		3	0	24	0
Chertanovo Moscow	2018–19	Russian First League	28	0	1	0	—		3	0	32	0
Chertanovo Moscow	2019–20	Russian First League	8	0	1	0	—		2	0	11	0
Chertanovo Moscow	Total		72	0	3	0	0	0	11	0	86	0
Krylia Sovetov Samara	2020–21	Russian First League	16	0	4	0	—		—		20	0
Krylia Sovetov Samara	2021–22	Russian Premier League	28	0	0	0	—		—		28	0
Krylia Sovetov Samara	2022–23	Russian Premier League	22	0	6	0	—		—		28	0
Krylia Sovetov Samara	2023–24	Russian Premier League	21	0	3	0	—		—		24	0
Krylia Sovetov Samara	2024–25	Russian Premier League	13	0	1	0	—		—		14	0
Krylia Sovetov Samara	Total		100	0	14	0	0	0	0	0	114	0
Sochi	2025–26	Russian Premier League	1	0	2	0	—		—		3	0
Career total			173	0	19	0	0	0	11	0	203	0
