= Maksim Vityugov =

Russian footballer

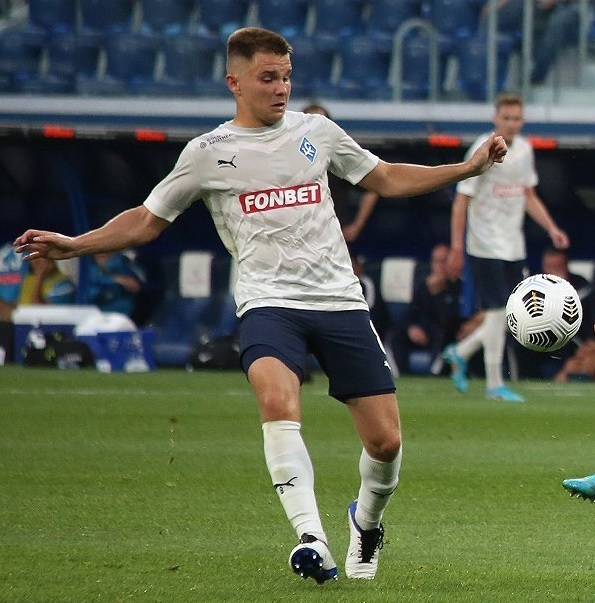
- Vityugov with Krylia Sovetov in 2022

Personal information
- Full name: Maksim Alekseyevich Vityugov
- Date of birth: 1 February 1998 (age 28)
- Place of birth: Krasnoyarsk, Russia
- Height: 1.78 m (5 ft 10 in)
- Position: Defensive midfielder

Team information
- Current team: PFC Krylia Sovetov Samara
- Number: 8

Senior career*
Years	Team	Apps	(Gls)
2015–2020	FC Chertanovo Moscow	113	(8)
2020–	PFC Krylia Sovetov Samara	151	(5)
- * Club domestic league appearances and goals as of 20 November 2026

Maksim Alekseyevich Vityugov (Russian: Максим Алексеевич Витюгов; born 1 February 1998) is a Russian football player who plays as a defensive midfielder for PFC Krylia Sovetov Samara.

== Club career ==
He made his debut in the Russian Professional Football League for FC Chertanovo Moscow on 10 April 2016 in a game against FC Zenit Penza. He made his Russian Football National League debut for Chertanovo on 17 July 2018 in a game against FC Rotor Volgograd.

He made his Russian Premier League debut for PFC Krylia Sovetov Samara on 25 July 2021 in a game against FC Akhmat Grozny.

== Career statistics ==
As of match played 20 November 2026

Appearances and goals by club, season and competition
Club	Season	League			Cup		Other		Total	
Club	Season	Division	Apps	Goals	Apps	Goals	Apps	Goals	Apps	Goals
Chertanovo Moscow	2015–16	Russian Second League	7	0	0	0	3 (Note: Appearances in the FNL Cup)	0	10	0
Chertanovo Moscow	2016–17	Russian Second League	21	1	2	0	5	0	28	1
Chertanovo Moscow	2017–18	Russian Second League	23	1	1	0	5	0	29	1
Chertanovo Moscow	2018–19	Russian First League	36	1	1	0	4	0	41	1
Chertanovo Moscow	2019–20	Russian First League	26	5	1	0	4	1	31	6
Chertanovo Moscow	Total		113	8	5	0	21	1	139	9
Krylia Sovetov Samara	2020–21	Russian First League	37	1	6	0	—		43	1
Krylia Sovetov Samara	2021–22	Russian Premier League	21	0	2	0	—		23	0
Krylia Sovetov Samara	2022–23	Russian Premier League	28	0	8	0	—		36	0
Krylia Sovetov Samara	2023–24	Russian Premier League	22	0	5	0	—		27	0
Krylia Sovetov Samara	2024–25	Russian Premier League	10	0	4	0	—		14	0
Krylia Sovetov Samara	2025–26	Russian Premier League	18	3	6	0	—		24	3
Krylia Sovetov Samara	2026–27	Russian Premier League	15	1	4	0	—		19	1
Krylia Sovetov Samara	Total		151	5	35	0	—		186	5
Career total			264	13	40	0	21	1	325	14
