= Anton Zinkovsky =

Russian footballer (born 1996)

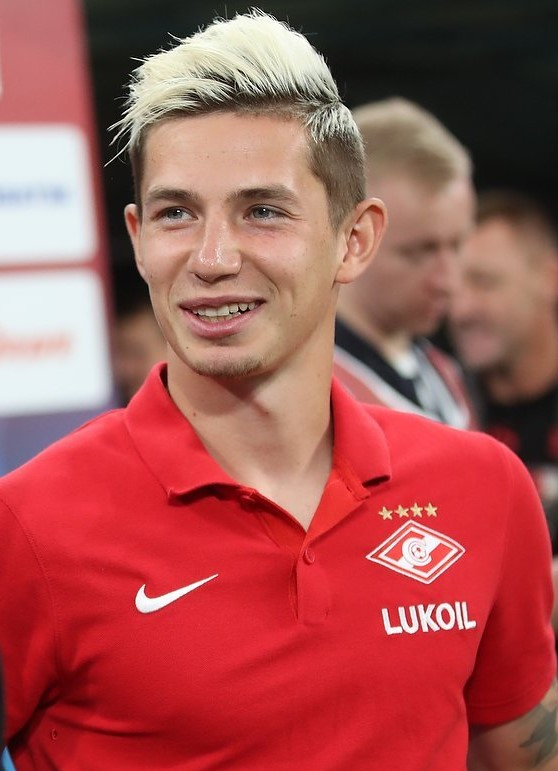
- Zinkovsky with Spartak Moscow in 2022

Personal information
- Full name: Anton Alekseyevich Zinkovsky
- Date of birth: 14 April 1996 (age 30)
- Place of birth: Novorossiysk, Russia
- Height: 1.75 m (5 ft 9 in)
- Position: Left winger

Team information
- Current team: Spartak Moscow/ Spartak-2 Moscow
- Number: 77

Youth career
- 2003–2008: Chernomorets Novorossiysk
- 2008–2013: Chertanovo Education Center
- 2013–2014: Kuban Krasnodar

Senior career*
Years	Team	Apps	(Gls)
2014–2019	Chertanovo Moscow	96	(36)
2016	→ Zenit Saint Petersburg (loan)	0	(0)
2016	→ Zenit-2 Saint Petersburg (loan)	8	(0)
2019–2022	Krylia Sovetov Samara	107	(15)
2022–	Spartak Moscow	61	(5)
2025	→ Krylia Sovetov Samara (loan)	11	(0)
2025–2026	→ Sochi (loan)	28	(3)
2026–	Spartak-2 Moscow	2	(0)

International career^{‡}
2013	Russia U-17	4	(1)
2016	Russia U-21	3	(0)
2023–2024	Russia	3	(0)
- * Club domestic league appearances and goals as of 1 November 2026 ‡ National team caps and goals as of 21 March 2024

Anton Alekseyevich Zinkovsky (Russian: Антон Алексеевич Зиньковский; born 14 April 1996) is a Russian football player who plays as a left winger for Spartak Moscow and Spartak-2 Moscow.

== Club career ==
Zinkovsky made his professional debut in the Russian Professional Football League for FC Chertanovo Moscow on 17 September 2014 in a game against FC Lokomotiv Liski.

On 13 January 2019, Zinkovsky signed a 3-year contract with Krylia Sovetov Samara. He made his Russian Premier League debut for Krylia Sovetov on 2 March 2019 in a game against FC Lokomotiv Moscow as a 90th-minute substitute for Aleksandr Samedov. On 30 November 2021, he extended his contract with Krylia Sovetov until the end of 2023.

On 23 June 2022, Zinkovsky signed a five-year contract with FC Spartak Moscow. He scored his first goal for the team in a 3-0 victory over PFC Sochi on 15 August 2022.

On 18 February 2025, Zinkovsky returned to Krylia Sovetov Samara on loan.

On 7 July 2025, he moved on a new loan to Sochi.

== International career ==
He was called up to the Russia national football team for the first time for October 2021 World Cup qualifiers against Slovakia and Slovenia.

Zinkovsky made his debut on 23 March 2023 in a friendly against Iran.

== Career statistics ==
=== Club ===
As of match played 1 November 2026

Appearances and goals by club, season and competition
Club	Season	League			Cup		Other		Total	
Club	Season	Division	Apps	Goals	Apps	Goals	Apps	Goals	Apps	Goals
Chertanovo Moscow	2014–15	Russian Second League	19	3	—		—		19	3
Chertanovo Moscow	2015–16	Russian Second League	19	3	2	0	4 (Note: Appearances in the FNL Cup)	0	25	3
Chertanovo Moscow	2016–17	Russian Second League	10	1	2	1	5	0	17	2
Chertanovo Moscow	2017–18	Russian Second League	26	18	3	0	5	3	34	21
Chertanovo Moscow	2018–19	Russian First League	22	11	1	0	—		23	11
Chertanovo Moscow	Total		96	36	8	1	14	3	118	40
Zenit-2 Saint Petersburg (loan)	2016–17	Russian First League	8	0	—		—		8	0
Krylia Sovetov Samara	2018–19	Russian Premier League	13	1	—		2 (Note: Appearances in the relegation play-offs)	1	15	2
Krylia Sovetov Samara	2019–20	Russian Premier League	27	0	1	0	—		28	0
Krylia Sovetov Samara	2020–21	Russian First League	37	10	5	1	—		42	11
Krylia Sovetov Samara	2021–22	Russian Premier League	30	4	2	0	—		32	4
Krylia Sovetov Samara	Total		107	15	8	1	2	1	117	17
Spartak Moscow	2022–23	Russian Premier League	28	3	8	0	1 (Note: Appearances in the Russian Super Cup)	0	37	3
Spartak Moscow	2023–24	Russian Premier League	26	2	11	2	—		37	4
Spartak Moscow	2024–25	Russian Premier League	7	0	6	0	—		13	0
Spartak Moscow	2026–27	Russian Premier League	0	0	0	0	—		0	0
Spartak Moscow	Total		61	5	25	2	1	0	87	7
Krylia Sovetov Samara (loan)	2024–25	Russian Premier League	11	0	—		—		11	0
Sochi (loan)	2025–26	Russian Premier League	28	3	3	1	—		31	4
Spartak-2 Moscow	2026	Russian Second League B	2	0	—		—		2	0
Career total			313	59	44	5	17	4	374	68

=== International ===
As of match played 21 March 2024

Appearances and goals by national team and year
National team	Year	Apps	Goals
Russia	2023	2	0
Russia	2024	1	0
Total		3	0

== Honours ==
Krylia Sovetov Samara

- Russian First League: 2020–21

Individual

- Russian Second League top scorer: 2017–18 (Zone West, 18 goals)
- Russian Premier League Goal of the Month: October 2022 (Spartak 2–2 CSKA Moscow, 16 October 2022)
