= Stepan Sherstnyov =

Russian footballer

Personal information
- Full name: Stepan Alekseyevich Sherstnyov
- Date of birth: 3 June 2001 (age 25)
- Place of birth: Moscow, Russia
- Height: 1.83 m (6 ft 0 in)
- Position: Midfielder

Youth career
- –2013: Dynamo Moscow
- 2013–2018: Strogino Moscow
- 2018–2019: FShM Moscow
- 2019–2020: Krylia Sovetov Samara

Senior career*
Years	Team	Apps	(Gls)
2018	Strogino Moscow	2	(0)
2020–2021	Krylia Sovetov Samara	2	(0)
2020–2021	→ Krylia Sovetov-2 Samara	13	(1)
2021	Nosta Novotroitsk	10	(0)
2022–2023	FShM Moscow (amateur)		
2023	Sakhalinets Moscow	6	(0)
- * Club domestic league appearances and goals as of 12 November 2023

Stepan Alekseyevich Sherstnyov (Russian: Степан Алексеевич Шерстнёв; born 3 June 2001) is a Russian football player.

== Club career ==
He made his debut in the Russian Football National League for Krylia Sovetov Samara on 17 October 2020 in a game against Volgar Astrakhan.

== Personal life ==
His father Aleksei Sherstnyov is a football coach and a former player.
