= Nikita Razdorskikh =

Russian footballer

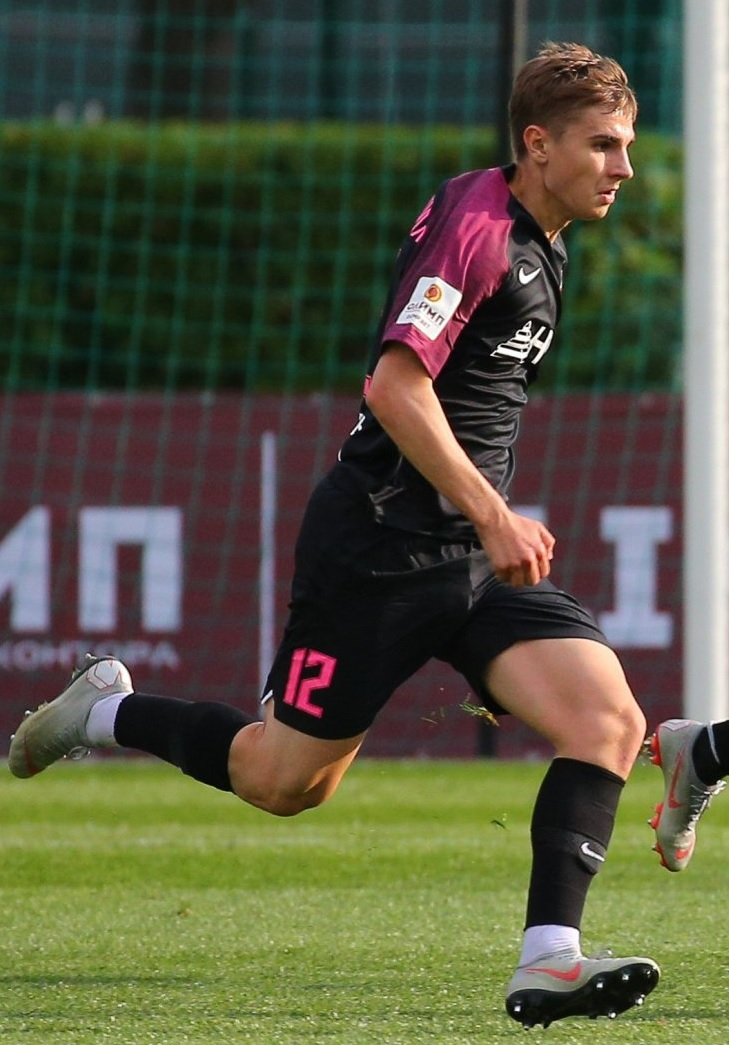
- Razdorskikh with Yenisey Krasnoyarsk in 2019

Personal information
- Full name: Nikita Vasilyevich Razdorskikh
- Date of birth: 13 January 2000 (age 26)
- Place of birth: Barnaul, Russia
- Height: 1.77 m (5 ft 10 in)
- Position: Midfielder

Team information
- Current team: FC Arsenal Tula
- Number: 21

Senior career*
Years	Team	Apps	(Gls)
2017–2018	FC Dynamo Barnaul	1	(0)
2018–2024	FC Yenisey Krasnoyarsk	123	(6)
2021	FC Yenisey-2 Krasnoyarsk	1	(0)
2024–	FC Arsenal Tula	51	(1)
- * Club domestic league appearances and goals as of 16 May 2026

Nikita Vasilyevich Razdorskikh (Russian: Никита Васильевич Раздорских; born 13 January 2000) is a Russian football player who plays for FC Arsenal Tula.

== Club career ==
He made his debut in the Russian Professional Football League for FC Dynamo Barnaul on 7 September 2017 in a game against FC Zenit Irkutsk.

He made his Russian Football National League debut for FC Yenisey Krasnoyarsk on 7 July 2019 in a game against FC Tekstilshchik Ivanovo.
