= Pavel Popov (footballer) =

Russian footballer

Personal information
- Full name: Pavel Yuryevich Popov
- Date of birth: 26 January 2003 (age 23)
- Place of birth: Moscow, Russia
- Height: 1.91 m (6 ft 3 in)
- Position: Forward

Team information
- Current team: Volna Nizhny Novgorod Oblast
- Number: 92

Youth career
- 2008–2019: Torpedo Moscow
- 2019–2021: Chertanovo Moscow

Senior career*
| Years | Team | Apps | (Gls) |
| 2021 | Chertanovo Moscow | 7 | (1) |
| 2022–2026 | Krylia Sovetov Samara | 6 | (0) |
| 2022–2023 | → Chertanovo Moscow (loan) | 56 | (10) |
| 2024–2025 | → Krylia Sovetov-2 Samara | 33 | (14) |
| 2025–2026 | → Veles Moscow (loan) | 15 | (1) |
| 2026– | Volna Nizhny Novgorod Oblast | 6 | (3) |

International career
| 2019 | Russia U-16 | 4 | (1) |
- * Club domestic league appearances and goals as of 31 October 2026

Pavel Yuryevich Popov (Russian: Павел Юревич Попов; born 26 January 2003) is a Russian football player who plays for Volna Nizhny Novgorod Oblast.

== Club career ==
He made his debut in the Russian Football National League 2 for Chertanovo Moscow on 29 August 2021 in a game against Murom.

He made his Russian Premier League debut for Krylia Sovetov Samara on 30 March 2024 in a game against Zenit Saint Petersburg.

== Career statistics ==
As of 24 October 2024

Appearances and goals by club, season and competition
| Club | Season | League | | | Cup | | Europe | | Total | |
| Club | Season | Division | Apps | Goals | Apps | Goals | Apps | Goals | Apps | Goals |
|---|---|---|---|---|---|---|---|---|---|---|
| Chertanovo Moscow | 2022–23 | Russian Second League | 7 | 1 | 0 | 0 | – | | 7 | 1 |
| Chertanovo Moscow (loan) | 2022–23 | Russian Second League | 8 | 2 | – | | – | | 8 | 2 |
| Chertanovo Moscow (loan) | 2022–23 | Russian Second League | 30 | 4 | 1 | 0 | – | | 31 | 4 |
| Chertanovo Moscow (loan) | 2023 | Russian Second League B | 18 | 4 | 1 | 0 | – | | 19 | 4 |
| Chertanovo Moscow (loan) | Total | | 56 | 10 | 2 | 0 | 0 | 0 | 58 | 10 |
| Krylia Sovetov Samara | 2023–24 | Russian Premier League | 4 | 0 | – | | – | | 4 | 0 |
| Krylia Sovetov Samara | 2024–25 | Russian Premier League | 1 | 0 | 1 | 0 | — | | 2 | 0 |
| Krylia Sovetov Samara | Total | | 5 | 0 | 1 | 0 | — | | 6 | 0 |
| Krylia Sovetov-2 Samara | 2024 | Russian Second League B | 23 | 7 | – | | – | | 23 | 7 |
| Career total | | | 91 | 18 | 3 | 0 | 0 | 0 | 94 | 18 |
