= FC Chertanovo-2 Moscow =

- Full name: Football Club Chertanovo-2 Moscow
- Founded: 2018
- Chairman: Nikolai Larin
- Manager: Vacant
- League: Russian Professional Football League, Zone West
- 2018–19: 13th (relegated)

FC Chertanovo-2 Moscow (Russian: «Чертаново-2» (Москва)) is a Russian football team from Moscow. It is the farm-club for FC Chertanovo Moscow.

== History ==
Following FC Chertanovo Moscow's promotion to the second-tier Russian National Football League at the end of the 2017–18 season, the club decided to organize a farm-club. It was licensed to play in the third-tier Russian Professional Football League for the 2018–19 season. It took the last place in the league and didn't participate in the PFL for the 2019–20 season.
