= Chertanovo Education Center =

Football academy in Moscow, Russia

Coordinates: 55°37′50″N 37°36′18″E

Chertanovo Sport and Education Center
- Other name: Chertanovo Football School
- Established: 1976
- Chairman: Nikolay Larin
- Location: Moscow, Russia
- Website: www.chertanovo-football.ru

Chertanovo Sport and Education Center (Russian: "ГБОУ ЦСО "Чертаново"), also known as Chertanovo Football Academy or Chertanovo Football School - is a Russian youth football academy based in Moscow, Russia.

The academy was founded in 1976 as The Sport School of Moscow's Soviet Region. It is based in the Chertanovo Severnoye district of the city's Southern Administrative Okrug (former Soviet Region). Academy develops young talents from all over Russia and is open to boys and girls from 6 to 17 years.

Chertanovo Sport and Education Center consists of several units: the Football Academy itself, grade and secondary school and sports boarding. Third-tier Russian Professional Football League team FC Chertanovo Moscow and Women's FC Chertanovo are also included in the academy structure.

Fully qualified UEFA license coaches train the youth teams. The training and education are free of charge.

== Russian National Youth Teams ==
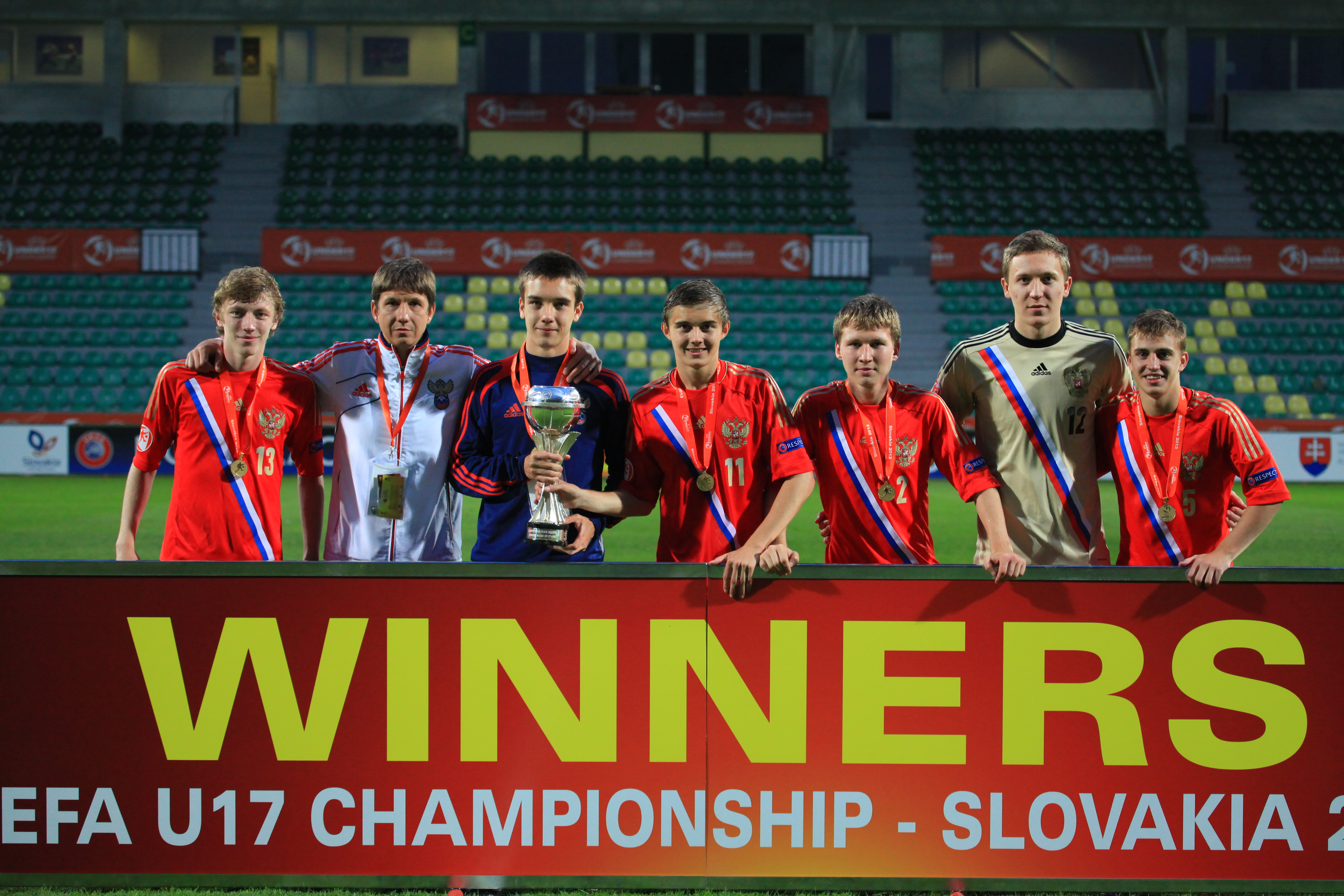
Six Chertanovo players and the academy director Nikolay Larin after the Final match at Euro-2013.

Several Chertanovo players are the members of Russian national youth teams.

11 players of Chertanovo team are members of Russiа U-17 national youth team, 6 of them are the Winners of 2013 UEFA European Under-17 Football Championship in Slovakia.

== Alumni ==
Chertanovo Academy is well known for its graduates - former forward Igor Kolyvanov (FC Dynamo Moscow, Foggia Italy, Bologna Italy, Soviet and Russian national teams), former defender Vasili Kulkov (FC Spartak Moscow, Benfica Portugal, Porto Portugal, Alverca Portugal, Russian national team), Diniyar Bilyaletdinov (FC Spartak Moscow, FC Everton England, FC Lokomotiv Moscow, Russian national team), Renat Sabitov (FC Tom Tomsk, FC Spartak Moscow, Russian national team), Andrei Gordeyev (FC Anzhi Makhachkala coach, former FC Saturn and FC Metalurh Donetsk head coach), Ilya Abayev (FC Lokomotiv Moscow goalkeeper) and many others.

== Youth teams ==
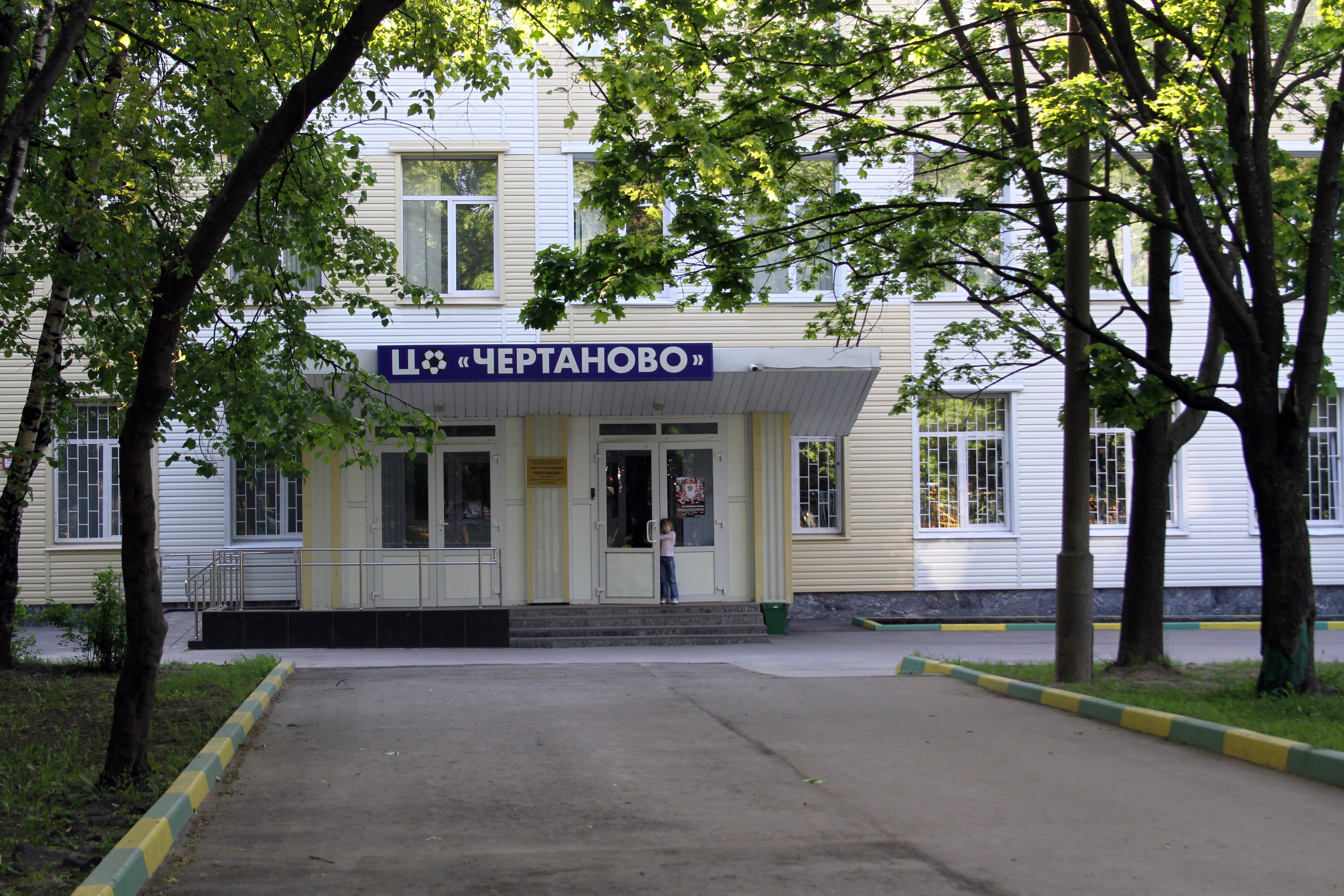
Chertanovo Education Center.

Besides men's and women's amateur teams there are 12 boys' teams (from U-6 to U-17) and 8 girls' teams (from U-10 to U-18) in Chertanovo Academy system.

== Tournaments ==
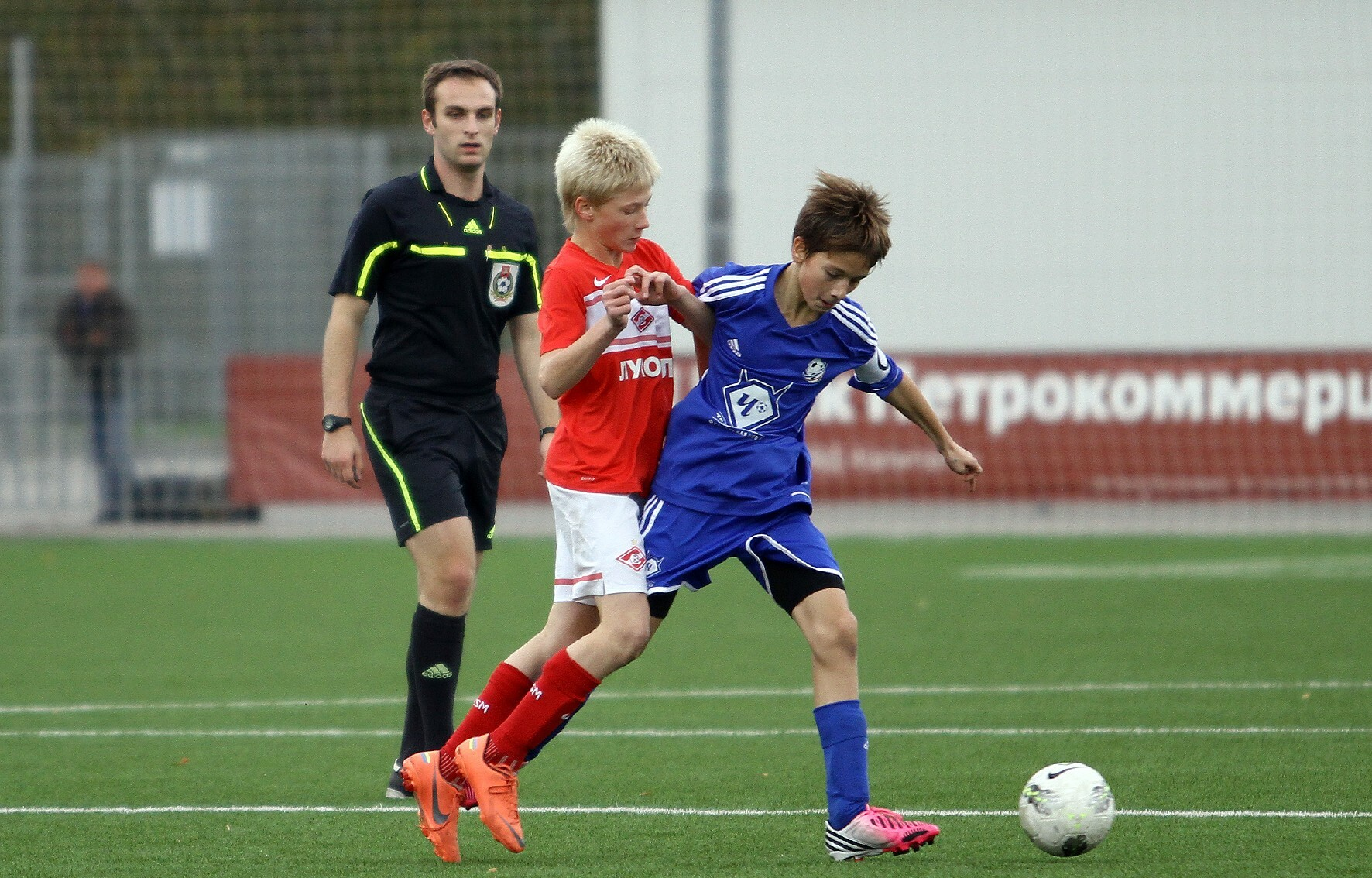
Moscow Top League. Chertanovo U-14 vs Spartak U-14. Chertanovo U-13 team captain Dmitriy Velikorodny.

As of 2014/15, FC Chertanovo Moscow plays in the Russian Professional Football League, Zone Center. Women's football club Chertanovo plays in First Division of Russian women's football championship (D-2).

Youth teams (boys and girls) play in Moscow Top League (D-1) vs best Russian Football Academies, including Spartak Moscow, CSKA Moscow and others.

Youth teams also take part in a number of youth tournaments all around Europe, Africa and Asia.

In 2010, 2012, 2013 and 2014 Chertanovo boys' U-14 teams took part in Tokyo International Youth Football Tournament. In 2010 boys' U-17 team won the International Tournament in Morocco and U-11 girls' team won silver medals of Vildbjerg Cup in Denmark. In 2013 boys' U-17 won the Montaigu Mondial Tournament for clubs in France.

Chertanovo Academy also organizes two International tournaments: The Kolyvanov Cup for boys' U-10 teams and The Chertanovo Cup for girls' U-12 teams.

The Kolyvanov Cup is held on January 5–10. In 2014 FC Dynamo Kyiv, Shahtar Donetsk, Lokomotiv Moscow, Dinamo Minsk and others were among the participants of the VI Kolyvanov Cup.
