= 2023–24 PFC Krylia Sovetov Samara season =

Krylia Sovetov Samara
2023–24 season
- Manager: Igor Osinkin
- Stadium: Solidarnost Samara Arena
- Russian Premier League: 9th
- Russian Cup: Group stage
- Top goalscorer: League: Benjamín Garré (9); All: Benjamín Garré (9)
- Highest home attendance: 23,225 v Spartak Moscow (1 October 2023, Russian Premier League)
- Lowest home attendance: 5,249 v Ural Yekaterinburg (11 November 2023, Russian Premier League)
- Average home league attendance: 8,813
- Biggest win: 5–1 v Rostov (Home, 5 August 2023, Russian Premier League); 4–0 v Spartak Moscow (Home, 1 October 2023, Russian Premier League)
- Biggest defeat: 0–3 v Akhmat Grozny (Home, 4 October 2023, Russian Cup); 0–3 v Spartak Moscow (Away, 9 December 2023, Russian Premier League); 1–4 v Dynamo Moscow (Away, 18 May 2024, Russian Premier League)
Home colours	Away colours

The 2023–24 season was Professional Football Club Krylia Sovetov Samara's 12th consecutive season in the Russian Premier League and 82nd season in existence as a football club. In addition to the domestic league, Krylia Sovetov Samara participated in the Russian Cup.

== Squad ==
Squad at end of season

Note: Flags indicate national team as defined under FIFA eligibility rules; some limited exceptions apply. Players may hold more than one non-FIFA nationality.

No.	Pos.	Nation	Player
1	GK	RUS	Ivan Lomayev
4	DF	RUS	Aleksandr Soldatenkov
5	DF	RUS	Yuri Gorshkov
6	MF	RUS	Sergei Babkin
7	FW	RUS	Dmitri Tsypchenko
8	MF	RUS	Maksim Vityugov
9	FW	RUS	Vladimir Khubulov
10	FW	ARG	Benjamín Garré
11	FW	RUS	Roman Yezhov
14	MF	RUS	Nikita Saltykov (on loan from Lokomotiv Moscow)
15	DF	RUS	Nikolai Rasskazov
17	FW	BLR	Yegor Karpitsky
18	MF	RUS	Denis Yakuba
20	MF	BIH	Amar Rahmanović
21	DF	UKR	Dmytro Ivanisenya

No.	Pos.	Nation	Player
22	DF	BRA	Fernando Costanza
23	DF	NED	Glenn Bijl
24	DF	RUS	Roman Yevgenyev
25	DF	BLR	Kiryl Pyachenin
30	MF	RUS	Artyom Sokolov
31	DF	RUS	Georgi Zotov
32	FW	ARG	Franco Orozco (on loan from Lanús)
33	DF	RUS	Aleksey Lysov
39	GK	RUS	Yevgeny Frolov
41	MF	RUS	Yegor Ushakov (on loan from CSKA Moscow)
73	FW	RUS	Vladislav Shitov
76	MF	RUS	Ivan Bobyor
77	FW	RUS	Vladimir Pisarsky
81	GK	RUS	Bogdan Ovsyannikov
95	DF	RUS	Ilya Gaponov

== Transfers ==
=== Summer ===
In: Note: Flags indicate national team as defined under FIFA eligibility rules; some limited exceptions apply. Players may hold more than one non-FIFA nationality.

No.	Pos.	Nation	Player
6	MF	RUS	Sergei Babkin (from Lokomotiv Moscow, previously on loan)
9	FW	RUS	Vladimir Khubulov (end of loan to Khimki)
14	FW	RUS	Nikita Saltykov (end of loan to Akron Tolyatti)
17	FW	BLR	Yegor Karpitsky (from (Belarus) Shakhtyor Soligorsk)
30	MF	RUS	Artyom Sokolov (end of loan to Pari Nizhny Novgorod)
33	DF	RUS	Aleksey Lysov (from Lokomotiv Moscow)
41	FW	RUS	Yegor Ushakov (on loan from CSKA Moscow)
44	DF	CRO	Mateo Barać (end of loan to (Belgium) Oostende)
63	FW	RUS	Aleksey Mutovkin (from own academy)
69	MF	RUS	Andrey Tsorn (from own academy)
71	GK	RUS	Mikhail Nedospasov (from own academy)
82	MF	RUS	Kirill Popov (from own academy)

Out: Note: Flags indicate national team as defined under FIFA eligibility rules; some limited exceptions apply. Players may hold more than one non-FIFA nationality.

No.	Pos.	Nation	Player
14	MF	RUS	Aleksandr Kovalenko (end of loan from Sochi)
16	GK	RUS	Daniil Veselov (on loan to Chelyabinsk)
19	FW	RUS	Nikita Khlusov (on loan to (Belarus) Dnepr Mogilev)
29	FW	KAZ	Aleksandr Zuyev (to (Serbia) IMT)
30	FW	SRB	Aleksandar Ćirković (on loan to (Serbia) TSC)
96	FW	RUS	Yegor Totsky (to Sochi)
—	GK	RUS	Danil Beltyukov (to Dynamo Vladivostok, previously on loan to Zenit-Izhevsk)
—	MF	RUS	Leonid Gerchikov (on loan to Chelyabinsk, previously on loan to Veles Moscow)
—	DF	RUS	Yan Gudkov (on loan to Sokol Saratov, previously on loan to Tekstilshchik Ivanovo)
—	DF	RUS	Aleksei Nikitenkov (on loan to Chelyabinsk, previously on loan to Veles Moscow)
—	DF	BLR	Dmitry Prishchepa (to Rotor Volgograd, previously on loan)
—	MF	RUS	Danil Lipovoy (on loan to Neftekhimik Nizhnekamsk, previously on loan to Volgar Astrakhan)
—	MF	RUS	Nikita Pershin (on loan to Chelyabinsk, previously on loan to Zvezda St. Petersburg)
—	MF	RUS	Vladislav Tyurin (to Novosibirsk, previously on loan to Tyumen)
—	MF	RUS	Dmitri Velikorodny (on loan to Chelyabinsk, previously on loan to Novosibirsk)
—	FW	RUS	Yegor Pankov (to Chertanovo Moscow, previously on loan to Zvezda St. Petersburg)

=== Winter ===
In: Note: Flags indicate national team as defined under FIFA eligibility rules; some limited exceptions apply. Players may hold more than one non-FIFA nationality.

No.	Pos.	Nation	Player
14	FW	RUS	Nikita Saltykov (on loan from Lokomotiv Moscow, previously to Lokomotiv)
25	DF	BLR	Kiryl Pyachenin (from Orenburg)
32	FW	ARG	Franco Orozco (on loan from (Argentina) Lanús)
53	DF	RUS	Yaroslav Demchenko (from own U19)
61	GK	RUS	Danil Beltyukov (end of loan to Dynamo Vladivostok)
65	DF	RUS	Ilya Gribakin (end of loan to Chertanovo Moscow)
66	FW	RUS	Yegor Pankov (end of loan to Chertanovo Moscow)
92	FW	RUS	Pavel Popov (end of loan to Chertanovo Moscow)

Out: Note: Flags indicate national team as defined under FIFA eligibility rules; some limited exceptions apply. Players may hold more than one non-FIFA nationality.

No.	Pos.	Nation	Player
44	DF	CRO	Mateo Barać (to (Kazakhstan) Aktobe)
—	GK	RUS	Nikita Yavorsky (on loan to Metallurg Lipetsk, previously on loan to Tekstilshchik Ivanovo)
—	MF	RUS	Dmitri Velikorodny (to Metallurg Lipetsk, previously on loan to Chelyabinsk)
—	FW	RUS	Nikita Khlusov (to Zvezda St. Petersburg, previously on loan to (Belarus) Dnepr Mogilev)

== Competitions ==
=== Overview ===
Competition	First match	Last match	Starting round	Final position	Record							
Competition	First match	Last match	Starting round	Final position	Pld	W	D	L	GF	GA	GD	Win %
Russian Premier League	22 July 2023	25 May 2024	Matchday 1	9th	30	11	8	11	46	44	+2	36.67
Russian Cup	26 July 2023	31 October 2023	Group stage	Group stage	6	1	0	5	5	12	−7	16.67
Total					36	12	8	16	51	56	−5	33.33

Source: Competitions

=== Russian Premier League ===
==== League table ====
Pos	Team	Pld	W	D	L	GF	GA	GD	Pts
7	Rostov	30	12	7	11	43	46	−3	43
8	Rubin Kazan	30	11	9	10	31	38	−7	42
9	Krylia Sovetov Samara	30	11	8	11	46	44	+2	41
10	Akhmat Grozny	30	10	5	15	33	45	−12	35
11	Fakel Voronezh	30	7	11	12	22	31	−9	32

Source: Premier Liga
Rules for classification: 1) Points; 2) Head-to-head points; 3) Head-to-head matches won; 4) Head-to-head goal difference; 5) Head-to-head goals scored; 6) Matches won; 7) Goal difference; 8) Goals scored; 9) 2022–23 position (not applicable to final standings); 10) Play-off. Note: if teams tied on points played an equal number of head-to-head games, head-to-head results are considered in aggregate, in a separate 'table'. If teams tied on points played a different number of head-to-head games, head-to-head criteria are considered in one-on-one pairs for each team against each other, then the teams are ordered by the number of one-on-one matchups they have advantage in.

==== Results summary ====
Overall								Home						Away					
Pld	W	D	L	GF	GA	GD	Pts	W	D	L	GF	GA	GD	W	D	L	GF	GA	GD
30	11	8	11	46	44	+2	41	7	6	2	30	17	+13	4	2	9	16	27	−11

Source: Premierliga.ru

==== Results by round ====
Round	1	2	3	4	5	6	7	8	9	10	11	12	13	14	15	16	17	18	19	20	21	22	23	24	25	26	27	28	29	30
Ground	A	H	H	A	A	H	H	A	H	H	A	A	H	A	H	H	A	A	A	H	A	H	A	H	A	H	A	H	A	H
Result	W	D	W	D	L	W	W	D	W	W	L	L	D	L	W	D	W	L	L	L	W	D	W	W	L	D	L	L	L	D
Position	7	5	3	5	7	4	3	3	2	2	2	3	3	4	4	5	4	6	8	8	6	7	6	5	5	6	6	8	9	9
Points	3	4	7	8	8	11	14	15	18	21	21	21	22	22	25	26	29	29	29	29	32	33	36	39	39	40	40	40	40	41

Source: Premierliga.ru
A = Away; H = Home; W = Win; D = Draw; L = Loss

==== Matches ====
22 July 2023 1	Akhmat Grozny	1–2	Krylia Sovetov Samara	Grozny
20:00 MSK (UTC+3)	Kamilov (yellow card) 54'; Čeliković (yellow card) 67'; Agalarov 90+' (pen.)	Report	Garré 13'; Yezhov (yellow card) 58'; Fernando (yellow card) 71'; Babkin 85'	Stadium: Akhmat-Arena; Attendance: 4,777; Referee: Sergei Karasev

29 July 2023 2	Krylia Sovetov Samara	3–3	Dynamo Moscow	Samara
16:00 SAMT (UTC+4)	Costanza 35'; Rahmanović (yellow card) 45+3'; Evgenyev (yellow card) 52'; Bijl 74'; Khubulov (yellow card) 84'; Garré 90+1' (pen.)	Report	Zakharyan 8'; Fomin (yellow card) 15'; Tyukavin 30'; Marichal (yellow card) 37'; Smolov 39'	Stadium: Solidarnost Samara Arena; Attendance: 6,189; Referee: Artem Lyubimov

5 August 2023 3	Krylia Sovetov Samara	5–1	Rostov	Samara
16:00 SAMT (UTC+4)	Khubulov 4'; Saltykov 10', 35'; Karpitsky 73'; Bijl (yellow card) 76'; Yezhov 90+' (pen.)	Report	Komlichenko 22' (yellow card) 34'; Mironov (yellow card) 40'; Mohebi (yellow card) 76'; Pesyakov (yellow card) 90+'	Stadium: Solidarnost Samara Arena; Attendance: 6,125; Referee: Sergei Karasev

12 August 2023 4	Lokomotiv Moscow	1–1	Krylia Sovetov Samara	Moscow
15:00 MSK (UTC+3)	Pinyaev (yellow card) 45'; Fasson (yellow card) 85'; Isidor (yellow card) 90+1'; Maradishvili 90+3'	Report	Garré (penalty missed) 60'; Rasskazov 86'; Costanza (yellow card) 90+4'	Stadium: RZD Arena; Attendance: 6,763; Referee: Pavel Kukuyan

19 August 2023 5	Rubin Kazan	2–1	Krylia Sovetov Samara	Kazan
19:30 MSK (UTC+3)	Gritsayenko 11'; Daku (penalty missed) 41', (yellow card) 78'; Martynovich 41'	Report	Garré 15'; Saltykov (yellow card) 57'; Bijl (yellow card) 67' (yellow-red card) 89'	Stadium: Ak Bars Arena; Attendance: 5,575; Referee: Sergey Cyganok

27 August 2023 6	Krylia Sovetov Samara	2–1	Baltika Kaliningrad	Samara
18:30 SAMT (UTC+4)	Soldatenkov (yellow card) 45'; Babkin 52'; Barać (yellow card) 80'; Fernando (yellow card) 85'; Zotov 90+'	Report	Musayev 89'; Dudiyev (yellow card) 90'	Stadium: Solidarnost Samara Arena; Attendance: 6,890; Referee: Sergey Ivanov

2 September 2023 7	Krylia Sovetov Samara	3–0	Fakel Voronezh	Samara
18:30 SAMT (UTC+4)	Costanza 28'; Lomayev (yellow card) 65'; Rahmanović 66'; Shitov 70'	Report	Kalinin (not on pitch, after the first half ended); Cele (yellow card) 56'	Stadium: Solidarnost Samara Arena; Attendance: 6,445; Referee: Evgeniy Kukulyak

16 September 2023 8	CSKA Moscow	2–2	Krylia Sovetov Samara	Moscow
14:00 MSK (UTC+3)	Zabolotnyi 32' (pen.); Willyan (yellow card) 37' (yellow-red card) 62'; Zdjelar (yellow card) 40'; Chalov 75'	Report	Rasskazov 2'; Saltykov 22'; Lomaev (yellow card) 31'; Costanza (yellow card) 67'; Bijl (yellow card) 88'; Soldatenkov (red card) 90'	Stadium: VEB Arena; Attendance: 8,109; Referee: Artem Lyubimov

23 September 2023 9	Krylia Sovetov Samara	2–1	Sochi	Samara
15:00 SAMT (UTC+4)	Saltykov 4'; Rahmanović 41'	Report	Noboa (yellow card) 47' (goal) 90+' (pen.); Burmistrov (yellow card) 57'; Marcelo (yellow card) 67'	Stadium: Solidarnost Samara Arena; Attendance: 9,651; Referee: Sergey Ivanov

1 October 2023 10	Krylia Sovetov Samara	4–0	Spartak Moscow	Samara
17:30 SAMT (UTC+4)	Gorshkov 7', 25'; Rahmanović (yellow card) 36'; Garré (yellow card) 41', (goal) 78'; Fernando (yellow card) 86'; Shitov 90' (yellow card) 90+'	Report	Sobolev (yellow card) 80'; Ignatov (yellow card) 83'; Duarte (yellow card) 85'	Stadium: Solidarnost Samara Arena; Attendance: 23,225; Referee: Rafael Shafeev

8 October 2023 11	Pari Nizhny Novgorod	2–0	Krylia Sovetov Samara	Nizhny Novgorod
14:00 MSK (UTC+3)	Sevikyan 13'; Kutateladze (yellow card) 72'; Tikhy (yellow card) 90+'; Zé Turbo 90+'	Report		Stadium: Nizhny Novgorod Stadium; Attendance: 7,967; Referee: Pavel Kukuyan

22 October 2023 12	Zenit Saint Petersburg	3–1	Krylia Sovetov Samara	Saint Petersburg
16:30 MSK (UTC+3)	Wendel 53', 80'; Sergeev (yellow card) 58'; Mostovoy 90+6'	Report	Rasskazov (yellow card) 36'; Yezhov (yellow card) 75', (goal) 90+8'	Stadium: Krestovsky Stadium; Attendance: 24,402; Referee: Artem Chistyakov

28 October 2023 13	Krylia Sovetov Samara	1–1	Orenburg	Samara
17:30 SAMT (UTC+4)	Garré 24'	Report	Marín (yellow card) 60'; Pérez 66'; Vera (yellow card) 76'; Obukhov (yellow card) 83'	Stadium: Solidarnost Samara Arena; Attendance: 5,659; Referee: Rafael Shafeev

5 November 2023 14	Krasnodar	2–1	Krylia Sovetov Samara	Krasnodar
14:00 MSK (UTC+3)	Córdoba 16'; Akhmetov (yellow card) 44'; Olusegun 73'; Banjac (yellow card) 87'	Report	Bijl (yellow card) 71'; Fernando (yellow card) 75'; Pisarsky 85'; Gorshkov (yellow card) 89'	Stadium: Krasnodar Stadium; Attendance: 31,055; Referee: Sergey Ivanov

11 November 2023 15	Krylia Sovetov Samara	3–1	Ural Yekaterinburg	Samara
15:00 SAMT (UTC+4)	Garré 14' (pen.), (yellow card) 87'; Costanza (penalty missed) 20'; Bijl (yellow card) 57'; Shitov 66'; Rahmanović (yellow card) 79'; Yezhov (yellow card) 90+'; Pisarsky 90+'	Report	Yegorychev (yellow card) 25'; Pomazun (yellow card) 34'; Bicfalvi (yellow card) 35'; Begić 46', (yellow card) 90+'; Gazinsky (red card) 90+'	Stadium: Solidarnost Samara Arena; Attendance: 5,249; Referee: Artyom Lyubimov

25 November 2023 16	Krylia Sovetov Samara	3–3	Lokomotiv Moscow	Samara
14:00 SAMT (UTC+4)	Soldatenkov (yellow card) 3'; Costanza 32', (yellow card) 48'; Garré (yellow card) 57', (goal) 90+12'; Gorshkov (yellow card) 72'; Pisarskiy 90+4'	Report	Glushenkov (yellow card) 14'; Karpukas (yellow card) 23'; Pinyaev 30'; Miranchuk (yellow card) 33'; Zhemaletdinov 62', 84'; Barinov (yellow card) 90'	Stadium: Solidarnost Samara Arena; Attendance: 5,924; Referee: Vasili Kazartsev

2 December 2023 17	Sochi	0–2	Krylia Sovetov Samara	Sochi
16:30 MSK (UTC+3)	Yurganov (yellow card) 33'; Yusupov (yellow card) 45+'; Zaika (yellow card) 90+'	Report	Fernando (yellow card) 20'; Yezhov 71'; Garré 90+' (pen.)	Stadium: Fisht Olympic Stadium; Attendance: 2,637; Referee: Vladimir Moskalyov

9 December 2023 18	Spartak Moscow	3–0	Krylia Sovetov Samara	Moscow
14:00 MSK (UTC+3)	Promes 2', (yellow card) 75'; Sobolev 8'; Umyarov (yellow card) 19'; Martins 50'	Report	Rahmanović (yellow card) 11'	Stadium: Otkritie Arena; Attendance: 7,217; Referee: Pavel Kukuyan

1 March 2024 19	Rostov	2–0	Krylia Sovetov Samara	Rostov-on-Don
19:00 MSK (UTC+3)	Golenkov 29' (yellow card) 41'; Sako (yellow card) 46'; Komarov 80'	Report	Vityugov (yellow card) 3'	Stadium: Rostov Arena; Attendance: 8,850; Referee: Evgeniy Kukulyak

8 March 2024 20	Krylia Sovetov Samara	0–2	CSKA Moscow	Samara
15:00 SAMT (UTC+4)	Evgenyev (yellow card) 21'; Orozco (penalty missed) 85'; Costanza (yellow card) 90+4'	Report	Willyan 3', 49', (yellow card) 17'; Moisés (yellow card) 14'; Dávila (yellow card) 56'	Stadium: Solidarnost Samara Arena; Attendance: 8,278; Referee: Vitali Meshkov

30 March 2024 22	Krylya Sovetov Samara	1–1	Zenit Saint Petersburg	Samara
15:00 SMT (UTC+4)	Shitov 1'; Rahmanović (yellow card) 59'; Vityugov (yellow card) 67'	Report	Artur 23'; Nino (yellow card) 82'	Stadium: Solidarnost Samara Arena; Attendance: 8,904; Referee: Rafael Shafeev

6 April 2024 23	Ural Yekaterinburg	1–2	Krylia Sovetov Samara	Yekaterinburg
16:00 YEKT (UTC+5)	Begić (yellow card) 17'; Kashtanov 41' (pen.); Ítalo (yellow card) 44' (yellow-red card) 60'; Ionov (yellow card) 86'	Report	Rahmanović 16', 79' (pen.); Orozco (yellow card) 17'; Vityugov (yellow card) 54'; Gorshkov (yellow card) 82'	Stadium: Central Stadium; Attendance: 5,912; Referee: Pavel Kukuyan

14 April 2024 24	Krylia Sovetov Samara	2–0	Rubin Kazan	Samara
20:00 SAMT (UTC+4)	Gorshkov 9', (yellow card) 28'; Vityugov (yellow card) 34'; Fernando Costanza (yellow card) 76'; Khubulov 90+'	Report	Iwu (yellow card) 8'; Vujačić (yellow card) 24'; Ranđelović (yellow card) 26'; Vada (yellow card) 34'; Kabutov (yellow card) 45'	Stadium: Solidarnost Samara Arena; Attendance: 7,909; Referee: Roman Galimov

20 April 2024 25	Baltika Kaliningrad	2–1	Krylia Sovetov Samara	Kaliningrad
15:30 KALT (UTC+2)	Fernández (yellow card) 66'; Zhirov (yellow card) 77'; Henríquez 84'; Radmanovac (yellow card) 90+'; Rybchinsky 90+'	Report	Pyachenin (yellow card) 34'; Lomayev (yellow card) 83'; Rahmanović 90+' (pen.)	Stadium: Kaliningrad Stadium; Attendance: 7,400; Referee: Sergey Cheban

25 April 2024 21	Fakel Voronezh	0–1	Krylia Sovetov Samara	Voronezh
18:15 MSK (UTC+3)	Appayev (yellow card) 6'; Akbashev (yellow card) 31'	Report	Yezhov (yellow card) 19'; Orozco 76'	Stadium: Tsentralnyi Profsoyuz Stadion; Attendance: 10,480; Referee: Pavel Shadykhanov

29 April 2024 26	Krylia Sovetov Samara	0–0	Krasnodar	Samara
14:00 SAMT (UTC+4)	Orozco (yellow card) 25'; Saltykov (yellow card) 68'	Report	Kady (yellow card) 17'; Volkov (yellow card) 45' (yellow-red card) 64'; Ektov (yellow card) 72'	Stadium: Solidarnost Samara Arena; Attendance: 12,217; Referee: Sergei Karasev

4 May 2024 27	Orenburg	2–1	Krylia Sovetov Samara	Orenburg
19:00 YEKT (UTC+5)	Ghorbani (yellow card) 11'; Pérez 24' (pen.); Vorobyov 67'	Report	Rahmanović 53'; Orozco (yellow card) 56'; Rasskazov (yellow card) 90+'	Stadium: Gazovik Stadium; Attendance: 4,229; Referee: Yevgeni Kukulyak

10 May 2024 28	Krylia Sovetov Samara	0–2	Akhmat Grozny	Samara
17:00 SAMT (UTC+4)	Babkin (yellow card) 22'	Report	Konaté 45+1'; Berisha 62'	Stadium: Solidarnost Samara Arena; Attendance: 7,382; Referee: Kirill Levnikov

18 May 2024 29	Dynamo Moscow	4–1	Krylia Sovetov Samara	Moscow
14:00 MSK (UTC+3)	Chávez (yellow card) 11'; Balbuena 29', 58'; Fernández (yellow card) 47'; Bitello 76'; Ngamaelu 90+2'	Report	Rasskazov (yellow card) 17'; Gorshkov 40'; Rahmanović (yellow card) 45+2'; Saltykov (yellow card) 49'	Stadium: VTB Arena; Attendance: 20,608; Referee: Pavel Kukuyan

25 May 2024 30	Krylia Sovetov Samara	1–1	Pari Nizhny Novgorod	Samara
17:30 SAMT (UTC+4)	Garré 58'	Report	Zé Turbo (yellow card) 35', (goal) 77'; Stamatov (yellow card) 42'; Aleksandrov (yellow card) 46'; Kalinsky (yellow card) 68'; Bozhenov (yellow card) 89'	Stadium: Solidarnost Samara Arena; Attendance: 12,153; Referee: Aleksey Sukhoy

=== Russian Cup ===
==== Group stage ====
Pos	Team	Pld	W	PW	PL	L	GF	GA	GD	Pts	Qualification	ZEN	BAL	AKH	KRY
1	Zenit Saint Petersburg	6	4	1	0	1	9	5	+4	14	Qualification to the Knockout phase (RPL path)	—	2–1	2–0	1–0
2	Baltika Kaliningrad	6	4	0	0	2	12	7	+5	12	Qualification to the Knockout phase (RPL path)	1–0	—	4–1	1–2
3	Akhmat Grozny	6	2	0	1	3	10	12	−2	7	Qualification to the Knockout phase (regions path)	3–3 (Note: Zenit won 2–4 on penalties.)	0–2	—	3–1
4	Krylia Sovetov Samara	6	1	0	0	5	5	12	−7	3		0–1	2–3	0–3	—

Source: Russian Football Union (in Russian), Soccerway
Rules for classification: 1) Points; 2) Head-to-head points; 3) Head-to-head matches won; 4) Head-to-head goal difference; 5) Head-to-head goals scored; 6) Matches won; 7) Goal difference; 8) Goals scored; 9) Penalty shoot-out goal difference; 10) Draw.
Notes:

26 July 2023 1	Krylia Sovetov Samara	2–3	Baltika Kaliningrad	Samara
19:30 SAMT (UTC+4)	Khubulov 10'; Bijl 89'	Report	Ostojić (yellow card) 7'; Fernández 56'; Henríquez 67'; Kuzmin 74'	Stadium: Solidarnost Samara Arena; Attendance: 8,021; Referee: Roman Safyan

9 August 2023 2	Krylia Sovetov Samara	0–1	Zenit Saint Petersburg	Samara
19:30 SAMT (UTC+4)		Report	Sergeev 50'; Queiroz (yellow card) 90+6'	Stadium: Solidarnost Samara Arena; Attendance: 18,617; Referee: Sergei Cheban

30 August 2023 3	Akhmat Grozny	3–1	Krylia Sovetov Samara	Grozny
17:15 MSK (UTC+3)	Konaté 44'; Čeliković 53' (yellow card) 90'; Berisha (yellow card) 80'; Oleynikov 90+4'	Report	Bijl 51'; Yevgenyev (yellow card) 63'	Stadium: Akhmat Arena; Attendance: 6,231; Referee: Pavel Shadykhanov

19 September 2023 4	Baltika Kaliningrad	1–2	Krylia Sovetov Samara	Kaliningrad
16:15 KALT (UTC+2)	Galoyan 90+1' (pen.)	Report	Soldatenkov (yellow card) 3'; Pisarsky 38'; Bijl (yellow card) 40+1'; Rahmanović 55'; Saltykov (yellow card) 75'	Stadium: Kaliningrad Stadium; Attendance: 6,983; Referee: Vera Opeykina

4 October 2023 5	Krylia Sovetov Samara	0–3	Akhmat Grozny	Samara
13:30 SAMT (UTC+4)	Zotov (yellow card) 21'; Yezhov (yellow card) 24'	Report	Ilyin 2'; Konaté 8'; Júnior (yellow card) 27'; Semyonov 66'	Stadium: Solidarnost Samara Arena; Attendance: 8,032; Referee: Yevgeni Kukulyak

31 October 2023 6	Zenit Saint Petersburg	1–0	Krylia Sovetov Samara	Saint Petersburg
19:30 MSK (UTC+3)	Renan (yellow card) 4'; Sergeev 87'	Report		Stadium: Gazprom Arena; Attendance: 24,519; Referee: Pavel Kukuyan
