= 2024–25 PFC Krylia Sovetov Samara season =

PFC Krylia Sovetov Samara
2024–25 season
- Manager: Igor Osinkin
- Stadium: Solidarnost Samara Arena
- Russian Premier League: 10th
- Russian Cup: Group Stage
- Top goalscorer: League: Franco Orozco; Thomas Galdames (3 each); All: Franco Orozco; Thomas Galdames (3 each)
- Highest home attendance: 15,389 vs Zenit St. Petersburg
- Lowest home attendance: 4,597 vs Akhmat Grozny
- Average home league attendance: 10,353
- Biggest win: Krylya Sovetov 3–1 Nizhny Novgorod
- Biggest defeat: Krylya Sovetov 0–4 Zenit; Dynamo Moscow 5–1 Krylya Sovetov; Krylya Sovetov 3–6 Dynamo Moscow
| Home colours | Away colours |
- All statistics correct as of 7 December 2024.

The 2024–25 season will be the 83rd season in the history of PFC Krylia Sovetov Samara, and the club's 13th consecutive season in Russian Premier League. In addition to the domestic league, the team is scheduled to participate in the Russian Cup.

== Transfers ==
=== Out ===
| Pos. | Player | Transferred to | Fee | Date | Source |
|---|---|---|---|---|---|
| DF | (Russia) Georgi Zotov | (Russia) Krylia Sovetov Samara | End of contract | 1 July 2024 | |
| FW | (Serbia) Aleksandar Ćirković | (Serbia) TSC Bačka Topola | Undisclosed | 1 July 2024 | |
| FW | (Belarus) Yegor Karpitsky | (Russia) Sokol Saratov | Loan | 3 July 2024 | |

== Friendlies ==
=== Pre-season ===
| 29 June 2024 Friendly | KAMAZ Naberezhnye Chelny (Russia) | 2–1 | (Russia) Krylia Sovetov Samara |
| 17:00 | 40'; 70' | | 33' |

| 4 July 2024 Friendly | Rubin Kazan (Russia) | 2–2 | (Russia) Krylia Sovetov Samara | Kazan |
| 11:00 | Čumić 30'; Vada 59' | | Teslenko 47' (o.g.); Pisarsky 89' | Stadium: Central Stadium |

| 7 July 2024 Friendly | Krylia Sovetov Samara (Russia) | 6–0 | (Russia) Sokol Saratov |
| 10:00 | Shitov 26'; Orozco 45'; Pisarsky 64', 90' (pen.); Bober 84'; Tsypchenko 88' |

| 13 July 2024 Friendly | Khimki (Russia) | 2–2 | (Russia) Krylia Sovetov Samara |
| UTZ |

== Competitions ==
=== Overall record ===
| Competition | First match | Last match | Starting round | Record | | | | | | | |
| Competition | First match | Last match | Starting round | Pld | W | D | L | GF | GA | GD | Win % |
|---|---|---|---|---|---|---|---|---|---|---|---|
| Russian Premier League | 20 July 2024 | 24 May 2025 | Matchday 1 | 18 | 5 | 3 | 10 | 19 | 29 | −10 | 27.78 |
| Russian Cup | 1 August 2024 | 24 October 2024 | | 7 | 0 | 2 | 5 | 9 | 23 | −14 | 0.00 |
| Total | | | | 25 | 5 | 5 | 15 | 28 | 52 | −24 | 20.00 |

Last updated: 7 December 2024
Source: Sovetov Samara/10610/ Soccerway

=== Russian Premier League ===
==== League table ====
| Pos | Team | Pld | W | D | L | GF | GA | GD | Pts | Qualification or relegation |
|---|---|---|---|---|---|---|---|---|---|---|
| 8 | Rostov | 30 | 10 | 9 | 11 | 41 | 43 | −2 | 39 | |
| 9 | Akron Tolyatti | 30 | 10 | 5 | 15 | 39 | 55 | −16 | 35 | |
| 10 | Krylia Sovetov Samara | 30 | 8 | 7 | 15 | 36 | 51 | −15 | 31 | |
| 11 | Dynamo Makhachkala | 30 | 6 | 11 | 13 | 27 | 35 | −8 | 29 (Note: Dynamo Makhachkala 4–1 Khimki, Khimki 1–1 Dynamo Makhachkala) | |
| 12 | Khimki (D, R) | 30 | 6 | 11 | 13 | 35 | 56 | −21 | 29 | Administratively relegated, then dissolved. (Note: Khimki were not issued the 2025–26 RPL license and were administratively relegated. They were replaced by Pari Nizhny Novgorod. Khimki were then dissolved.) |

Source: Premier Liga
Rules for classification: 1) Points; 2) Head-to-head points; 3) Head-to-head matches won; 4) Head-to-head goal difference; 5) Head-to-head goals scored; 6) Matches won; 7) Goal difference; 8) Goals scored; 9) 2023–24 position (not applicable to final standings); 10) Play-off. Note: if teams tied on points did not play an equal number of head-to-head games, head-to-head results are not considered for the standings.
(D) Disqualified; (R) Relegated

==== Results summary ====
| Overall | | | | | | | | Home | | | | | | Away | | | | | |
| Pld | W | D | L | GF | GA | GD | Pts | W | D | L | GF | GA | GD | W | D | L | GF | GA | GD |
|---|---|---|---|---|---|---|---|---|---|---|---|---|---|---|---|---|---|---|---|
| 18 | 5 | 3 | 10 | 19 | 29 | −10 | 18 | 3 | 1 | 5 | 10 | 14 | −4 | 2 | 2 | 5 | 9 | 15 | −6 |

Last updated: 7 December 2024.

==== Results by round ====
| Round | 1 | 2 | 3 | 4 | 5 | 6 | 7 | 8 | 9 | 10 | 11 | 12 | 13 | 14 | 15 | 16 | 17 | 18 | 19 |
|---|---|---|---|---|---|---|---|---|---|---|---|---|---|---|---|---|---|---|---|
| Ground | H | H | A | H | A | H | H | A | A | H | A | A | H | A | H | H | A | A | A |
| Result | L | L | L | W | L | W | L | W | W | D | D | D | L | L | L | W | W | L | |
| Position | 16 | 16 | 16 | 14 | 15 | 11 | 12 | 9 | 10 | 10 | 9 | 9 | 11 | 12 | 12 | 12 | 10 | | |

Updated to match(es) played on 7 December 2024. Source:
A = Away; H = Home; W = Win; D = Draw; L = Loss

==== Matches ====
The match schedule was released on 20 June 2024.

| 20 July 2024 1 | Krylia Sovetov Samara | 0–4 | Zenit Saint Petersburg | Samara |
| 18:30 SAMT (UTC+4) | | Report | Glushenkov 6', 45+2'; Cassierra 18'; Artur (yellow card) 33'; Pedro 90+3' | Stadium: Samara Arena; Attendance: 15,839; Referee: Sergey Ivanov |

| 26 July 2024 2 | Krylia Sovetov Samara | 1–3 | Rostov | Samara |
| 19:00 SAMT (UTC+4) | Soldatenkov (yellow card) 63'; Orozco 65'; Evgenyev (yellow card) 67' (yellow-red card) 87'; Tsypchenko (yellow card) 80' | Report | Soldatenkov 44' (o.g.); Golenkov 63'; Langovich 73'; Shchetinin (yellow card) 80'; Ronaldo (yellow card) 90+3' | Stadium: Samara Arena; Attendance: 9,093; Referee: Yevgeni Kukulyak |

| 5 August 2024 3 | Spartak Moscow | 3–0 | Krylia Sovetov Samara | Moscow |
| 20:00 MSK (UTC+3) | Ugalde 29', 56'; Prutsev 40'; Denisov (yellow card) 61' | Report | Babkin (yellow card) 23'; Vityugov (yellow card) 28'; Bijl (yellow card) 68'; Popov (yellow card) 86' | Stadium: Lukoil Arena; Attendance: 13,407; Referee: Kirill Levnikov |

| 11 August 2024 4 | Krylia Sovetov Samara | 2–0 | Fakel Voronezh | Samara |
| 18:30 SAMT (UTC+4) | Rasskazov (yellow card) 35'; Costanza 75', (yellow card) 76'; Orozco 78' | Report | Bozhin (yellow card) 35'; Kvekveskiri (yellow card) 86' | Stadium: Samara Arena; Attendance: 7,790; Referee: Sergey Karasev |

| 17 August 2024 5 | Dynamo Moscow | 1–0 | Krylia Sovetov Samara | Moscow |
| 17:00 MSK (UTC+3) | Fomin (yellow card) 33'; Bitello 75'; Dasa (yellow card) 84' | Report | Maksim Vityugov (yellow card) 54' | Stadium: VTB Arena; Attendance: 10,134; Referee: Pavel Kukuyan |

| 25 August 2024 6 | Krylia Sovetov Samara | 3–1 | Nizhny Novgorod | Samara |
| 16:00 SAMT (UTC+4) | Costanza (yellow card) 56'; Galdames 71', 76'; Orozco 90' | Report | Viktor Aleksandrov (yellow card) 52'; Boselli 57' | Stadium: Samara Arena; Attendance: 9,442; Referee: Mikhail Cheremnykh |

| 1 September 2024 7 | Krylia Sovetov Samara | 0–1 | Dynamo Makahchkala | Samara |
| 18:30 SAMT (UTC+4) | Soldatenkov (yellow card) 72'; Dmitriev (yellow card) 90+4' | Report | Paltsev (yellow card) 37'; Gadzhiyev 44'; Glushkov (yellow card) 47'; Sandrachuk (yellow card) 82' | Stadium: Samara Arena; Attendance: 9,257; Referee: Sergey Cheban |

| 13 September 2024 8 | Rubin Kazan | 0–2 | Krylia Sovetov Samara | Kazan |
| 20:15 MSK (UTC+3) | Ashurmatov (yellow card) 35' | Report | Garré 37' (pen.); Oleynikov 42'; Pechenin (yellow card) 52'; Costanza (yellow card) 67'; Dmitriev (yellow card) 90+4' | Stadium: Kazan Arena; Attendance: 8,188; Referee: Vladislav Bezborodov |

| 23 September 2024 9 | Akhmat Grozny | 1–1 | Krylia Sovetov Samara | Grozny |
| 18:30 MSK (UTC+3) | Felippe (yellow card) 27', (goal) 68'; Camilo (yellow card) 29'; Todorović (yellow card) 90+6' | Report | Ezhov (yellow card) 49'; Oleynikov (yellow card) 60'; Oroz (yellow card) 87', (goal) 90+6' | Stadium: Akhmat Arena; Attendance: 4,907; Referee: Yevgeni Kukulyak |

| 29 September 2024 10 | Krylia Sovetov Samara | 0–0 | Khimki | Samara |
| 18:30 SAMT (UTC+4) | Galdames (yellow card) 35'; Soldatenkov (yellow card) 57' | Report | Fariña (yellow card) 39'; Fernández (yellow card) 90+4' | Stadium: Samara Arena; Attendance: 9,176; Referee: Kirill Levnikov |

| 6 October 2024 11 | Lokomotiv Moscow | 1–0 | Krylia Sovetov Samara | Moscow |
| 16:30 MSK (UTC+3) | Barinov (yellow card) 74'; Suleymanov 75'; Samoshnikov (yellow card) 86' | Report | | Stadium: RZD Arena; Attendance: 8,034; Referee: Artem Chistyakov |

| 20 October 2024 12 | Orenburg | 2–2 | Krylia Sovetov Samara | Orenburg |
| 16:30 MSK (UTC+3) | Pérez (yellow card) 56'; Marín 73', 90+3'; Cuero (yellow card) 90+7' | Report | Sergeev 11'; Pechenin 31'; Ezhov (yellow card) 34'; Costanza (red card) 68'; Rasskazov (yellow card) 71' | Stadium: Gazovik Stadium; Attendance: 4,314; Referee: Aleksandr Mashlyakevich |

| 28 October 2024 13 | Krylia Sovetov Samara | 1–2 | Krasnodar | Samara |
| 19:30 SAMT (UTC+4) | Garré (yellow card) 88'; Galdames 89' | Report | Cordoba 42'; Costa 49'; Batxi (yellow card) 82' | Stadium: Samara Arena; Attendance: 5,610; Referee: Sergey Cheban |

| 3 November 2024 14 | Akron Tolyatti | 2–0 | Krylia Sovetov Samara | Samara |
| 14:00 SAMT (UTC+4) | Escoval 20'; Lončar (yellow card) 59'; Kuzmin (yellow card) 64'; Dzyuba 72' | Report | Babkin (yellow card) 50'; Sergeev 90+2' | Stadium: Samara Arena; Attendance: 8,438; Referee: Mikhail Cheremnykh |

| 10 November 2024 15 | Krylia Sovetov Samara | 1–2 | CSKA Moscow | Samara |
| 14:00 SAMT (UTC+4) | Oleynikov (yellow card) 35'; Méndez (yellow card) 45+1'; Dmitriev 60'; Galdames (yellow card) 90+5' | Report | Koïta (yellow card) 18'; Diveev 45+5'; Krugovoy 84' | Stadium: Samara Arena; Attendance: 5,716; Referee: Ivan Abrosimov |

| 24 November 2024 16 | Krylia Sovetov Samara | 2–1 | Akhmat Grozny | Samara |
| 16:00 SAMT (UTC+4) | Oroz 49'; Rasskazov (yellow card) 57'; Dmitriev (yellow card) 75', (goal) 88' | Report | Ghandri (yellow card) 39'; Samorodov 43' utkin 68'; Todorović (yellow card) 85' | Stadium: Samara Arena; Attendance: 4,597; Referee: Pavel Shadykhanov |

| 1 December 2024 17 | Zenit Saint Petersburg | 2–3 | Krylia Sovetov Samara | Saint Petersburg |
| 16:30 MSK (UTC+3) | Glushenkov 4'; Alip 72' | Report | Sergeev 17', 28'; Oleynikov 18'; Oroz (yellow card) 36'; Pesjakov (yellow card) 90+6' | Stadium: Krestovsky Stadium; Attendance: 28,820; Referee: Yevgeni Kukulyak |

| 7 December 2024 18 | Rostov | 2–1 | Krylia Sovetov Samara | Rostov-on-Don |
| 16:30 MSK (UTC+3) | Langovich (yellow card) 22'; Oroz 38' (o.g.); Vakhania (yellow card) 40'; Mohebi 50'; Osipenko 73'; Komarov (yellow card) 82' | Report | Pechenin (yellow card) 25'; Rasskazov (yellow card) 32'; Oleynikov 32'; Garré (yellow card) 52'; Oroz (yellow card) 71' (red card) 81' | Stadium: Rostov Arena; Attendance: 8,434; Referee: Vitali Meshkov |

| 2 March 2025 19 | Krasnodar | v | Krylia Sovetov Samara | Krasnodar |
| 18:00 MSK (UTC+3) | | Report | | Stadium: Krasnodar Stadium |

=== Russian Cup ===
==== Group stage ====
| Pos | Team | Pld | W | PW | PL | L | GF | GA | GD | Pts | Qualification |
|---|---|---|---|---|---|---|---|---|---|---|---|
| 1 | Spartak Moscow | 6 | 5 | 0 | 0 | 1 | 14 | 4 | +10 | 15 | Qualification to the Knockout phase (RPL path) |
| 2 | Dynamo Moscow | 6 | 3 | 1 | 0 | 2 | 17 | 13 | +4 | 11 | Qualification to the Knockout phase (RPL path) |
| 3 | Dynamo Makhachkala | 6 | 2 | 0 | 2 | 2 | 8 | 8 | 0 | 8 | Qualification to the Knockout phase (regions path) |
| 4 | Krylia Sovetov Samara | 6 | 0 | 1 | 0 | 5 | 8 | 22 | −14 | 2 | |

Source: Russian Football Union (in Russian), Soccerway
Rules for classification: 1) Points; 2) Head-to-head points; 3) Head-to-head matches won; 4) Head-to-head goal difference; 5) Head-to-head goals scored; 6) Matches won; 7) Goal difference; 8) Goals scored; 9) Penalty shoot-out goal difference; 10) Draw.

| 1 August 2024 1 | Dynamo Makhachkala | 1–0 | Krylia Sovetov Samara | Makhachkala |
| 19:30 MSK (UTC+3) | Gadzhiev 83', (yellow card) 90+5' | Report | Pisarskiy (yellow card) 40' | Stadium: Anzhi Arena; Attendance: 10,027; Referee: Sergey Tsyganok |

| 14 August 2024 2 | Krylia Sovetov Samara | 0–3 | Spartak Moscow | Samara |
| 20:30 SAMT (UTC+4) | Evgenyev (yellow card) 14'; Costanza (yellow card) 73' | Report | Litvinov (yellow card) 28'; Maslov (yellow card) 30'; Martins 64'; Medina 83'; Zorin 90+3' | Stadium: Samara Arena; Attendance: 20,040; Referee: Ivan Abrosimov |

| 28 August 2024 3 | Dynamo Moscow | 5–1 | Krylia Sovetov Samara | Moscow |
| 19:30 MSK (UTC+3) | Bokov 9'; Okishor 21', 45+1'; Fernández (yellow card) 56'; Gladyshev 57'; Makarov 83' | Report | Costanza 42' (pen.) | Stadium: VTB Arena; Attendance: 12,515; Referee: Yevgeni Bulanov |

| 19 September 2024 4 | Spartak Moscow | 4–1 | Krylia Sovetov Samara | Moscow |
| 20:45 MSK (UTC+3) | Nicholson 2'; Zobnin 19'; Marquinhos (yellow card) 24'; Khlusevich (yellow card) 24'; Pechenin 41' (o.g.); Mangas 89' | Report | Pechenin (yellow card) 34' (yellow-red card) 86'; Shitov 68'; Costanza (yellow card) 70' | Stadium: Lukoil Arena; Attendance: 13,014; Referee: Roman Safyan |

| 2 October 2024 5 | Krylia Sovetov Samara | 3–3 (5–3 p) | Dynamo Makhachkala | Samara |
| 20:00 SAMT (UTC+4) | Babaev 1', 43'; Tsypchenko 11' | Report | Paltsev (yellow card) 50'; Agalarov 57', 66'; Gadzhiev (yellow card) 84', (goal) 90+2' | Stadium: Samara Arena; Attendance: 5,092; Referee: Mikhail Cheremnykh |
| | Penalties |
| | Sergeev (penalty scored); Garré (penalty scored); Oleynikov (penalty scored); Méndez (penalty scored); Dmitriev (penalty scored) | | Agalarov (penalty scored); Gadzhiev (penalty missed); Yusupov (penalty scored); Paltsev (penalty scored) |

| 24 October 2024 6 | Krylia Sovetov Samara | 3–6 | Dynamo Moscow | Samara |
| 20:00 SAMT (UTC+4) | Garré 13' (pen.); Galdames 17'; Gaponov 77' | Report | Gladyshev 9'; Maouhoub 16', 53', 82', (yellow card) 84'; Gagnidze 27', (yellow card) 68'; Makarov 51'; Lepskii (yellow card) 64'; Nazarenko (yellow card) 88' | Stadium: Samara Arena; Attendance: 5,086; Referee: Yan Bobrovskiy |
