= Amar Rahmanović =

Bosnian footballer (born 1994)

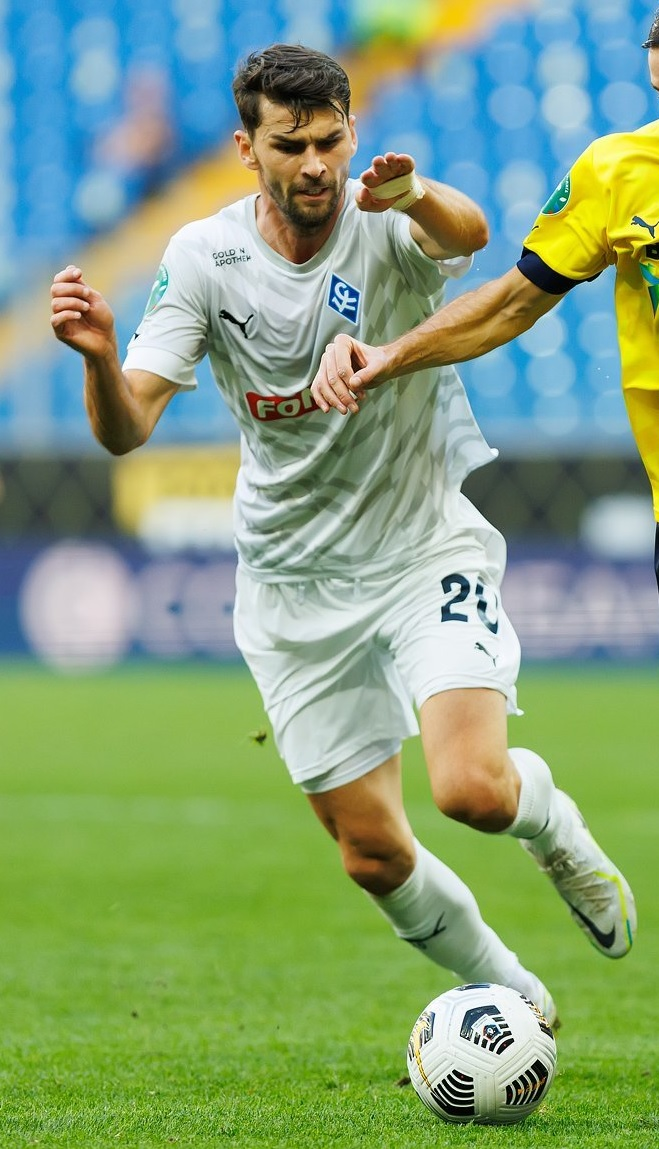
- Rahmanović playing for Krylia Sovetov in 2022

Personal information
- Date of birth: 13 May 1994 (age 32)
- Place of birth: Sindelfingen, Germany
- Height: 1.92 m (6 ft 4 in)
- Position: Attacking midfielder

Team information
- Current team: Krylia Sovetov
- Number: 11

Youth career
- 2001–2010: Sloboda Tuzla

Senior career*
Years	Team	Apps	(Gls)
2010–2012	Sloboda Tuzla	16	(2)
2012–2013	Novi Pazar	12	(0)
2013–2014	Olimpic	18	(2)
2014	Istra 1961	6	(0)
2015	Koper	24	(4)
2016	Maribor	8	(0)
2016–2017	Celje	15	(3)
2017–2021	Sarajevo	79	(23)
2021–2022	Konyaspor	54	(6)
2022–	Krylia Sovetov	88	(17)

International career^{‡}
2010	Bosnia and Herzegovina U17	4	(1)
2011–2013	Bosnia and Herzegovina U19	13	(1)
2015	Bosnia and Herzegovina U21	3	(0)
2020–2024	Bosnia and Herzegovina	8	(1)
- * Club domestic league appearances and goals as of 8 November 2026 ‡ National team caps and goals as of 21 March 2024

Amar Rahmanović (pronounced [ǎmar raxmâːnoʋitɕ]; born 13 May 1994) is a professional footballer who plays as an attacking midfielder for Russian Premier League club Krylia Sovetov. Born in Germany, he played for the Bosnia and Herzegovina national team.

Rahmanović started his professional career at Sloboda Tuzla, before joining Novi Pazar in 2012. The following year, he moved to Olimpic. A year later, he signed with Istra 1961. In 2015, he joined Koper. The year after, Rahmanović switched to Maribor. Later that year, he moved to Celje. He signed with Sarajevo in 2017. Four years later, Rahmanović was transferred to Konyaspor. The following year, he joined Krylia Sovetov.

A former youth international for Bosnia and Herzegovina, Rahmanović made his senior international debut in 2020, earning 8 caps until 2024.

== Club career ==
=== Early career ===
Rahmanović came through Sloboda Tuzla's youth academy, which he joined in 2001. He made his professional debut against Drina Zvornik on 16 October 2010 at the age of 16. On 24 September 2011, he scored his first professional goal against Olimpic.

In September 2012, he signed with Serbian team Novi Pazar. In July 2013, he moved to Olimpic. In June 2014, Rahmanović joined Croatian side Istra 1961. In January 2015, he signed with Slovenian outfit Koper. In January 2016, he was transferred to Maribor. In August, he switched to Celje.

=== Sarajevo ===
In June 2017, Rahmanović signed a two-year deal with Sarajevo. He made his official debut for the team in a UEFA Europa League qualifier against Bălți on 29 June. A month later, he made his league debut against Zrinjski Mostar. On 30 July, he scored his first goal for Sarajevo in a triumph over Čelik Zenica.

In December 2018, Rahmanović extended his contract with the squad until June 2021. He won his first trophy with the club on 15 May 2019, by beating Široki Brijeg in the Bosnian Cup final. On 8 November 2020, he played his 100th game for Sarajevo against Tuzla City.

=== Konyaspor ===
In January 2021, Rahmanović was transferred to Turkish outfit Konyaspor for an undisclosed fee. He made his competitive debut for the team on 24 January against Antalyaspor. On 11 September, he scored his first goal for Konyaspor in a defeat of Altay.

He signed a new two-year deal with the club in November.

=== Krylia Sovetov ===
In September 2022, Rahmanović moved to Russian side Krylia Sovetov on a three-year contract. He debuted officially for the squad against Rostov on 17 September. On 9 October, he scored his first goal for Krylia Sovetov against Spartak Moscow.

In June 2025, Rahmanović put pen to paper on a new one-year deal with the team. In June 2026, Rahmanović signed a new deal with Krylia Sovetov for one season, with an option for the 2027–28 season.

== International career ==
Rahmanović represented Bosnia and Herzegovina at all youth levels. In March 2020, he received his first senior call up, for the UEFA Euro 2020 qualifying play-offs against Northern Ireland, but had to wait until 12 November to make his debut in a friendly game against Iran.

On 13 October 2023, in a UEFA Euro 2024 qualifier against Liechtenstein, Rahmanović scored his first senior international goal.

== Personal life ==
Rahmanović married his long-time girlfriend Hana in December 2024.

== Career statistics ==
=== Club ===
As of match played 8 November 2026

Appearances and goals by club, season and competition
Club	Season	League			National cup (Note: Includes Serbian Cup, Bosnian Cup, Slovenian Cup, Turkish Cup, Russian Cup)		Continental		Total	
Club	Season	Division	Apps	Goals	Apps	Goals	Apps	Goals	Apps	Goals
Sloboda Tuzla	2010–11	Bosnian Premier League	4	0	0	0	–		4	0
Sloboda Tuzla	2011–12	Bosnian Premier League	12	2	0	0	–		12	2
Sloboda Tuzla	Total		16	2	0	0	–		16	2
Novi Pazar	2012–13	Serbian SuperLiga	12	0	1	0	–		13	0
Olimpic	2013–14	Bosnian Premier League	18	2	5	1	–		23	3
Istra 1961	2014–15	Croatian Football League	6	0	0	0	–		6	0
Koper	2014–15	Slovenian PrvaLiga	9	1	3	0	–		12	1
Koper	2015–16	Slovenian PrvaLiga	15	3	2	2	3 (Note: Appearances in UEFA Europa League)	2	20	7
Koper	Total		24	4	5	2	3	2	32	8
Maribor	2015–16	Slovenian PrvaLiga	7	0	1	0	–		8	0
Maribor	2016–17	Slovenian PrvaLiga	1	0	0	0	0	0	1	0
Maribor	Total		8	0	1	0	0	0	9	0
Celje	2016–17	Slovenian PrvaLiga	15	3	1	2	–		16	5
Sarajevo	2017–18	Bosnian Premier League	25	5	1	0	2	0	28	5
Sarajevo	2018–19	Bosnian Premier League	28	9	7	2	4	0	39	11
Sarajevo	2019–20	Bosnian Premier League	12	3	2	0	2 (Note: Appearances in UEFA Champions League)	0	16	3
Sarajevo	2020–21	Bosnian Premier League	14	6	2	3	3 (Note: Two appearances in UEFA Champions League; one appearance in UEFA Europa League)	0	19	9
Sarajevo	Total		79	23	12	5	11	0	102	28
Konyaspor	2020–21	Süper Lig	18	0	1	0	–		19	0
Konyaspor	2021–22	Süper Lig	31	6	3	1	–		34	7
Konyaspor	2022–23	Süper Lig	5	0	0	0	3 (Note: Appearances in UEFA Conference League)	1	8	1
Konyaspor	Total		54	6	4	1	3	1	61	8
Krylia Sovetov	2022–23	Russian Premier League	17	1	9	0	–		26	1
Krylia Sovetov	2023–24	Russian Premier League	26	6	3	1	–		29	7
Krylia Sovetov	2024–25	Russian Premier League	7	0	0	0	–		7	0
Krylia Sovetov	2025–26	Russian Premier League	24	5	4	1	–		28	6
Krylia Sovetov	2026–27	Russian Premier League	14	5	2	1	–		16	6
Krylia Sovetov	Total		88	17	18	3	–		106	20
Career total			320	57	47	14	17	3	384	74

=== International ===
Appearances and goals by national team and year
National team	Year	Apps	Goals
Bosnia and Herzegovina
Bosnia and Herzegovina	2020	3	0
Bosnia and Herzegovina	2021	1	0
Bosnia and Herzegovina	2022	1	0
Bosnia and Herzegovina	2023	2	1
Bosnia and Herzegovina	2024	1	0
Total		8	1

Scores and results list Bosnia and Herzegovina's goal tally first, score column indicates score after each Rahmanović goal.

List of international goals scored by Amar Rahmanović
No.	Date	Venue	Cap	Opponent	Score	Result	Competition
1	13 October 2023	Rheinpark Stadion, Vaduz, Liechtenstein	6	Liechtenstein	1–0	2–0	UEFA Euro 2024 qualifying

== Honours ==
Koper

- Slovenian Cup: 2014–15
- Slovenian Supercup: 2015

Maribor

- Slovenian Cup: 2015–16

Sarajevo

- Bosnian Premier League: 2018–19, 2019–20
- Bosnian Cup: 2018–19, 2020–21
