= 2024–25 FC Ural Yekaterinburg season =

FC Ural Yekaterinburg
2024–25 season
- Manager: Yevgeni Averyanov
- Stadium: Central Stadium
- Russian First League: 7th
- Russian Cup: Pre-season
- All statistics correct as of 3 August 2024.

The 2024–25 season is the 95th season in the history of FC Ural Yekaterinburg, and the club's first season back in the Russian First League. In addition to the domestic league, the team is scheduled to participate in the Russian Cup.

== Transfers ==
=== In ===
Pos.	Player	Transferred from	Fee	Date	Source
FW	(Russia) Ilya Porokhov	(Russia) Khimki	Loan	11 July 2024	

=== Out ===
Pos.	Player	Transferred to	Fee	Date	Source
FW	(Brazil) Guilherme Schettine	(Portugal) Moreirense	Contract termination	1 July 2024	
MF	(Russia) Yury Gazinsky	(Russia) Krasnodar	Free	10 July 2024	
DF	(Portugal) Kiki Afonso	(Portugal) AVS Futebol SAD	Free	13 July 2024	
MF	(Russia) Igor Dmitriev	(Russia) Spartak Moscow	Undisclosed	26 July 2024	

== Friendlies ==
=== Mid-season ===
22 January 2025 Friendly	Ural Yekaterinburg (Russia)	1–1	(Uzbekistan) FC AGMK

== Competitions ==
=== Overall record ===
Competition	First match	Last match	Starting round	Record							
Competition	First match	Last match	Starting round	Pld	W	D	L	GF	GA	GD	Win %
Russian First League	14 July 2024		Matchday 1	5	3	1	1	8	4	+4	60.00
Russian Cup				0	0	0	0	0	0	+0	—
Total				5	3	1	1	8	4	+4	60.00

Last updated: 12 August 2024
Source: Soccerway

=== Russian First League ===
==== League table ====
Pos	Team	Pld	W	D	L	GF	GA	GD	Pts	Promotion, qualification or relegation
2	Torpedo Moscow (Note: The owner and the general director of Torpedo were arrested on 19 June 2025 and later charged with attempting to bribe a referee during the 2024–25 season. Russian Football Union conducted their own investigation. On 10 July 2025, Torpedo was excluded from the RPL for the 2025–26 season, cancelling their promotion. They remained in the Russian First League.)	34	17	14	3	51	25	+26	65	
3	Chernomorets Novorossiysk (Note: Chernomorets was not issued the 2025–26 RPL license and was replaced in the play-offs by Sochi.)	34	19	7	8	51	34	+17	64	
4	Ural Yekaterinburg	34	16	11	7	50	38	+12	59	Qualification to Premier League play-offs
5	Sochi (O, P)	34	16	9	9	55	34	+21	57	Qualification to Premier League play-offs
6	SKA-Khabarovsk	34	15	8	11	44	41	+3	53	

Source: Soccerway
Rules for classification: 1) Points; 2) Head-to-head points; 3) Head-to-head matches won; 4) Head-to-head goal difference; 5) Head-to-head goals scored; 6) Head-to-head away goals scored; 7) Matches won; 8) Goal difference; 9) Goals scored; 10) Away matches won; 11) Away goals scored; 12) Best disciplinary record (3 points for red card, 1 point for yellow card); 13) Drawing lots. If teams tied on points did not play an equal number of head-to-head games, head-to-head criteria and disciplinary record are not used for positioning. If 1st- and 2nd-placed teams are tied in the final standings on the first 12 criteria, a winner is determined in an additional play-off game, with no extra time and a penalty-shootout if tied at the end of regulation, instead of drawing lots.
(O) Play-off winners; (P) Promoted

==== Results summary ====
Overall								Home						Away					
Pld	W	D	L	GF	GA	GD	Pts	W	D	L	GF	GA	GD	W	D	L	GF	GA	GD
5	3	1	1	8	4	+4	10	2	1	0	4	1	+3	1	0	1	4	3	+1

Last updated: 12 August 2024.

==== Results by round ====
Round	1	2	3	4	5
Ground	H	H	A	H	A
Result	W	W	L	D	W
Position	3	2			

Updated to match(es) played on 12 August 2024. Source:
A = Away; H = Home; W = Win; D = Draw; L = Loss

==== Matches ====
The tentative match schedule was released on 27 June.

14 July 2024 1	Ural Yekaterinburg	2–0	Sochi	Yekaterinburg
16:00 UTC+3	Kashtanov 49'; Ayupov 58'; Ishkov (yellow card) 81'; Chudin (yellow card) 90'		Burmistrov (yellow card) 30'; Saavedra (yellow card) 76'	Stadium: Central Stadium; Attendance: 10,616; Referee: Ivan Saraev

20 July 2024 2	Ural Yekaterinburg	2–1	Shinnik Yaroslavl	Yekaterinburg
12:30 UTC+3	Miškić 83' (pen.); Begić 89'		Samoylov 40' (pen.)	Stadium: Central Stadium; Attendance: 8,956; Referee: Konstantin Averyanov

27 July 2024 3	Chernomorets Novorossiysk	3–2	Ural Yekaterinburg	Novorossiysk
19:30 UTC+3	Goglichidze 30' (o.g.); Rodionov 45'; Uridia 45+2'		Ishkov 9'; Ítalo 52'	Stadium: Central Stadium; Attendance: 7,019; Referee: Sergey Kulikov

3 August 2024 4	Ural Yekaterinburg	0–0	Sokol Saratov	Yekaterinburg
16:00 UTC+3				Stadium: Central Stadium; Attendance: 10,545; Referee: Igor Egorov

12 August 2024 5	Ufa	0–2	Ural Yekaterinburg	Ufa
			Voronov 33'; Ionov 78'	Stadium: Neftyanik Stadium
