= Thomas Galdames =

Chilean footballer (born 1998)

Personal information
- Full name: Thomas Ignacio Galdames Millán
- Date of birth: 20 November 1998 (age 27)
- Place of birth: Santiago, Chile
- Height: 1.77 m (5 ft 10 in)
- Position: Defender

Team information
- Current team: Krylia Sovetov Samara
- Number: 3

Youth career
- Unión Española

Senior career*
Years	Team	Apps	(Gls)
2016–2022	Unión Española	84	(3)
2023–2024	Godoy Cruz	46	(2)
2024–	Krylia Sovetov Samara	36	(4)

International career^{‡}
2015	Chile U17		
2024	Chile	4	(0)
- * Club domestic league appearances and goals as of 29 August 2026 ‡ National team caps and goals as of 15 October 2024

Thomas Ignacio Galdames Millán (born 20 November 1998) is a Chilean professional footballer who plays as a defender for Russian side Krylia Sovetov Samara. He also played for the Chile national team.

== Club career ==
In 2023, Galdames signed with Argentine Primera División club Godoy Cruz.

In the second half of 2024, Galdames moved to Europe and joined Krylia Sovetov Samara in the Russian Premier League. On 3 August 2024, Krylia Sovetov announced a three-year contract with Galdames. On 25 August, he scored twice in Krylia's 3–1 comeback victory over Pari NN.

== International career ==
Galdames represented Chile U17 during 2015. In 2020, he took part of the Chile U23 squad in the Pre-Olympic Tournament, but he didn't any appearance.

At senior level, he received his first call up for the 2026 World Cup qualifiers in September 2023.

Galdames made his debut on 29 June 2024 in a Copa América game against Canada. He substituted Darío Osorio in the 30th minute after the starting left-back Gabriel Suazo was sent off. The game ended scoreless and Chile was eliminated.

== Personal life ==
Thomas is the son of the Chilean former international footballer Pablo Galdames, the younger brother of Pablo Jr., the older brother of Benjamín and the half-brother of Mathías Galdames. In addition, through his maternal line, he and his brothers are related to the Spanish-Chilean footballer Nerea Sánchez Millán.

Galdames Millán is of Mapuche descent and his second surname, Millán, means "golden" in Mapudungun.

== Career statistics ==
=== Club ===
As of match played 14 October 2026

Appearances and goals by club, season and competition
Club	Season	League			Cup		Continental		Total	
Club	Season	Division	Apps	Goals	Apps	Goals	Apps	Goals	Apps	Goals
Unión Española	2016–17	Chilean Primera División	0	0	1 (Note: Appearances in the Copa Chile)	0	0	0	1	0
Unión Española	2017	Chilean Primera División	0	0	0	0	0	0	0	0
Unión Española	2018	Chilean Primera División	9	0	0	0	0	0	9	0
Unión Española	2019	Chilean Primera División	9	0	2	1	1 (Note: Appearances in the Copa Sudamericana)	0	12	1
Unión Española	2020	Chilean Primera División	25	1	0	0	0	0	25	1
Unión Española	2021	Chilean Primera División	41	2	7	2	2	0	50	4
Unión Española	Total		84	3	10	3	3	0	97	6
Godoy Cruz	2023	Argentine Primera División	32	2	1	0	—		33	2
Godoy Cruz	2024	Argentine Primera División	14	0	1	0	2 (Note: Appearances in the Copa Libertadores)	0	17	0
Godoy Cruz	Total		46	2	2	0	2	0	50	0
Krylia Sovetov Samara	2024–25	Russian Premier League	21	3	3	1	—		24	4
Krylia Sovetov Samara	2025–26	Russian Premier League	12	1	7	0	—		19	1
Krylia Sovetov Samara	2026–27	Russian Premier League	3	0	4	0	—		7	0
Krylia Sovetov Samara	Total		36	4	14	1	0	0	50	5
Career total			166	9	26	4	5	0	197	13

=== International ===
As of match played 15 October 2024

Appearances and goals by national team and year
National team	Year	Apps	Goals
Chile	2024	4	0
Total		4	0
