= Maksim Voronov =

Russian footballer (born 2007)

Personal information
- Full name: Maksim Sergeyevich Voronov
- Date of birth: 18 October 2007 (age 19)
- Place of birth: Tyumen, Russia
- Height: 1.86 m (6 ft 1 in)
- Position: Forward

Team information
- Current team: CSKA Moscow
- Number: 97

Youth career
- 2013–2020: SSh TRIES Tyumen
- 2021: SShOR VIZ Yekaterinburg
- 2022–2024: Ural Yekaterinburg

Senior career*
Years	Team	Apps	(Gls)
2024–2025	Ural Yekaterinburg	34	(8)
2025–	CSKA Moscow	11	(0)

International career^{‡}
2023	Russia U-16	3	(2)
2024	Russia U-17	4	(1)
2025	Russia U-19	3	(1)
2026–	Russia U-21	2	(0)
- * Club domestic league appearances and goals as of 7 November 2026 ‡ National team caps and goals as of 30 March 2026

Maksim Sergeyevich Voronov (Russian: Максим Сергеевич Воронов; born 18 October 2007) is a Russian footballer who plays as a forward for CSKA Moscow.

== Club career ==
Voronov made his debut in the Russian First League for Ural Yekaterinburg on 20 July 2024 in a game against Shinnik Yaroslavl.

On 31 December 2025, Voronov signed a contract with CSKA Moscow until 2030.

== Career statistics ==
As of 7 November 2026

Club	Season	League			Cup		Other		Total	
Club	Season	Division	Apps	Goals	Apps	Goals	Apps	Goals	Apps	Goals
Ural Yekaterinburg	2024–25	Russian First League	20	4	3	1	2 (Note: Appearances in promotion play-offs)	0	25	5
Ural Yekaterinburg	2025–26	Russian First League	14	4	1	0	–		15	4
Ural Yekaterinburg	Total		34	8	4	1	2	0	40	9
CSKA Moscow	2025–26	Russian Premier League	9	0	1	0	–		10	0
CSKA Moscow	2026–27	Russian Premier League	2	0	1	0	–		3	0
CSKA Moscow	Total		11	0	2	0	0	0	13	0
Career total			45	8	6	1	2	0	53	9
