= Ezequiel Garré =

Argentine footballer

Ezequiel Garré (born 10 November 1981 in Buenos Aires, Argentina) is an Argentine former professional footballer who played as a defender.

== Personal life ==
He is the first son of the Argentine coach Oscar Garré, the brother of Argentine footballer Emiliano Garré and uncle of Benjamín Garré.

== Clubs ==
- Deportes Concepción 2003
- Portimonense 2003–2004
- Chacarita Juniors 2005
- San Martín de Mendoza 2006
- Ilisiakos 2006–2007
- Gimnasia y Esgrima de Jujuy 2007
- Ilisiakos 2008–2009
- C.A.I. 2009–2010
- Almirante Brown 2011–2014
- Argentinos Juniors 2014–2016
- Patronato 2016
- Huracán 2016–2018
- Tigre 2018
