= Oscar Garré =

Argentine footballer

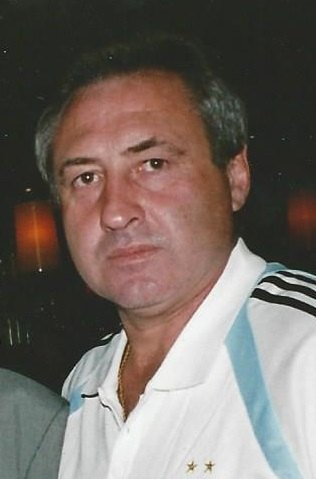
- Garré in 2006

Personal information
- Full name: Oscar Alfredo Garré
- Date of birth: 9 December 1956 (age 69)
- Place of birth: Valentín Alsina, Argentina
- Height: 1.75 m (5 ft 9 in)
- Position: Defender

Senior career*
Years	Team	Apps	(Gls)
1974–1988	Ferro Carril Oeste	581	(16)
1988–1989	Huracán	18	(2)
1989–1994	Ferro Carril Oeste	(see above)	
1989–1990	Hapoel Kfar Saba	6	(0)
1995–1996	Hapoel Be'er Sheva	0	(0)

International career
1983–1988	Argentina	39	(1)
Medal record
Representing Argentina
FIFA World Cup
Winner	1986 Mexico	Team
- * Club domestic league appearances and goals

Oscar Alfredo Garré (born 9 December 1956) is an Argentine former professional footballer who played as a defender for Ferro Carril Oeste and the Argentine national team.

== Career ==
Garré played most of his career (1974–88 and 1989–94) as a defender for Ferro Carril Oeste, and was part of the team that won the Nacional championships of 1982 and 1984. Their 1982 campaign saw Ferro finish the league without losing a single game.

Garré was part of the Argentina squad that won the 1986 World Cup.

In 1994, he went to Israel, where he played for Hapoel Kfar Saba and Hapoel Be'er Sheva in the local football league. He retired in 1996, aged almost 40.

After retirement, he has coached such teams as Lanús, Chile's Universidad Católica, and Huachipato. Between August 2006, and 2007 he worked as the coach of his former club Ferro Carril Oeste, he was replaced with former Argentina teammate José Luis Brown.

== Personal life ==
He is the father of the Argentine players Emiliano and Ezequiel. He is also the grandfather of another player, Benjamín

== Honours ==
Ferro Carril Oeste

- Primera División Argentina: Nacional 1982, Nacional 1984
- Primera B Metropolitana: 1978

Argentina

- FIFA World Cup: 1986
