= Benjamín Garré =

Argentinian footballer (born 2000)

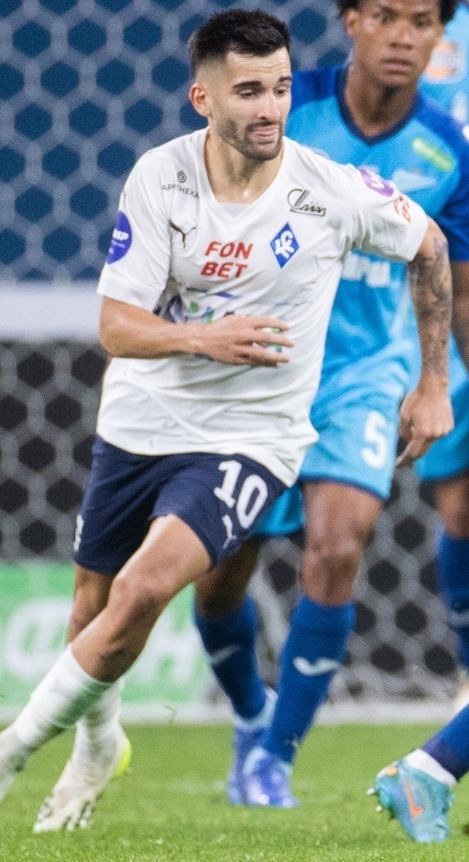

Personal information
- Full name: Benjamín Antonio Garré
- Date of birth: 11 July 2000 (age 26)
- Place of birth: Buenos Aires, Argentina
- Height: 1.71 m (5 ft 7 in)
- Positions: Attacking midfielder; winger

Team information
- Current team: Aris (on loan from Vasco da Gama)
- Number: 7

Youth career
- –2016: Vélez Sarsfield
- 2016–2019: Manchester City

Senior career*
| Years | Team | Apps | (Gls) |
| 2020–2023 | Racing Club | 13 | (1) |
| 2022–2023 | → Huracán (loan) | 26 | (4) |
| 2023–2025 | Krylia Sovetov Samara | 47 | (13) |
| 2025– | Vasco da Gama | 12 | (0) |
| 2026– | → Aris (loan) | 18 | (3) |

International career^{‡}
| 2015 | Argentina U15 | 6 | (2) |
| 2017 | Argentina U17 | 4 | (0) |
| 2019 | Argentina U20 | 3 | (1) |
- * Club domestic league appearances and goals as of 19 September 2026 ‡ National team caps and goals as of 20:21, 29 January 2023 (UTC)

Benjamín Garré (born 11 July 2000) is an Argentine professional footballer who plays as attacking midfielder or winger for Super League Greece club Aris, on loan from Vasco da Gama.

== Club career ==
Garré is a graduate of the club Club Atlético Vélez Sarsfield. In June 2016, he signed with English club Manchester City. To get game practice, he played for the Citizens youth team (61 matches and 14 goals), including in the UEFA Youth League. Before the start of the 2018–19 season, he went on a pre-season tour of the United States with Manchester City and, as part of the 2018 International Champions Cup, played his first match for the main team against Borussia Dortmund (1–0 loss) - replacing Phil Foden in the 73rd minute. He also came on as a substitute in matches against Liverpool (2–1 loss) and Bayern Munich (3–2 win).

At the beginning of 2020, Garré returned to his homeland, signing a contract with Racing Club de Avellaneda. On 28 February, in a match against Newell's Old Boys, he made his debut in the Argentine Primera División. On 24 September, in the 2020 Copa Libertadores match against the Peruvian Club Alianza Lima, he scored his first goal for Racing.

In 2021, a left knee injury took him out of the game for seven months and forced him to start over.

In the summer of 2022, Garré moved to Club Atlético Huracán on loan. On 11 June, in a match against Rosario Central, he made his debut for a new team. On 25 July, in a duel against Club Atlético Colón, he scored his first goal for Huracan.

In January 2023, Garré moved to the Russian club Krylia Sovetov Samara, signing a contract for 3.5 years. The transfer amount was €1.75 million. He became the second Argentine player in the history of the club - after Gustavo Lillo.

In February 2025, Garré moved to the Brazilian club Vasco da Gama.

== International career ==
In 2015, Garré became the bronze medalist of the 2015 South American Championship under the age of 15.

In 2017, he took part in the 2017 South American U-17 Championship in Chile. At the tournament, he played in matches against the national teams of Venezuela (1–0), Paraguay (1–0), Peru (3–0 win) and Brazil (2–0 loss).

== Personal life ==
Benjamín Garré was born on 11 July 2000 in Buenos Aires. At the age of 5, his mother, Jacqueline, took him to the Villarreal-Versailles club because he played football at home 24 hours a day, endangering his house. Soon they begin to notice him and at the age of 7 he moves to the Vélez Sarsfield club, where he remained until 2016.

His grandfather, Oscar Garré, was the 1986 FIFA World Cup champion. All his male relatives (with the exception of the middle son Oscar) played for Huracán in different years: father (Oscar's youngest son) — Emiliano Garré, two uncles — Ezequiel Garré (Oscar's eldest son) and Leonardo Ariel Orsi (Benjamín's godfather and brother of Benjamín's mother Jacqueline).

On 9 January 2023, Garre married model Luana Malfitano, and a year earlier, in February 2022, they had a daughter, Amira.

== Career statistics ==
As of match played 7 December 2024

Appearances and goals by club, season and competition
| Club | Season | League | | | National cup | | Continental | | Other | | Total | |
| Club | Season | Division | Apps | Goals | Apps | Goals | Apps | Goals | Apps | Goals | Apps | Goals |
|---|---|---|---|---|---|---|---|---|---|---|---|---|
| Manchester City U23 | 2017–18 | — | | | — | | — | | 3 (Note: Appearance(s) in EFL Trophy) | 1 | 3 | 1 |
| Manchester City U23 | 2018–19 | — | | | — | | — | | 4 | 0 | 4 | 0 |
| Manchester City U23 | 2019–20 | — | | | — | | — | | 0 | 0 | 0 | 0 |
| Manchester City U23 | Total | | — | | — | | — | | 7 | 1 | 7 | 1 |
| Manchester City | 2018–19 | Premier League | — | | — | | — | | 3 | 0 | 3 | 0 |
| Racing Club de Avellaneda | 2019–20 | Argentine Primera División | 2 | 0 | 6 | 0 | 6 | 1 | — | | 14 | 1 |
| Racing Club de Avellaneda | 2021 | Argentine Primera División | 11 | 1 | — | | — | | — | | 11 | 1 |
| Racing Club de Avellaneda | 2022 | Argentine Primera División | — | | 6 | 1 | 1 | 0 | — | | 11 | 1 |
| Racing Club de Avellaneda | Total | | 13 | 1 | 12 | 1 | 7 | 1 | — | | 36 | 3 |
| Huracán | 2022 | Argentine Primera División | 26 | 4 | — | | — | | — | | 26 | 4 |
| Krylia Sovetov Samara | 2022–23 | Russian Premier League | 13 | 3 | 5 | 0 | — | | — | | 18 | 3 |
| Krylia Sovetov Samara | 2023–24 | Russian Premier League | 20 | 9 | 5 | 0 | — | | — | | 25 | 9 |
| Krylia Sovetov Samara | 2024–25 | Russian Premier League | 14 | 1 | 4 | 1 | — | | — | | 18 | 2 |
| Krylia Sovetov Samara | Total | | 47 | 13 | 14 | 1 | — | | — | | 61 | 14 |
| Career total | | | 86 | 18 | 26 | 2 | 7 | 1 | 10 | 1 | 129 | 22 |

== Honours ==
Argentina U15

- South American U-15 Championship Bronze: 2015

Individual

- Russian Premier League Player of the Month: July/August 2023.
