= Igor Dmitriyev (footballer) =

Russian footballer (born 2004)

Personal information
- Full name: Igor Sergeyevich Dmitriyev
- Date of birth: 24 July 2004 (age 22)
- Place of birth: Saint Petersburg, Russia
- Height: 1.78 m (5 ft 10 in)
- Position: Left winger

Team information
- Current team: Spartak Moscow
- Number: 27

Youth career
- –2017: Zenit St. Petersburg
- 2017–2020: Kolomyagi St. Petersburg
- 2020: Zenit St. Petersburg

Senior career*
Years	Team	Apps	(Gls)
2021–2023	Leningradets	46	(11)
2023–2024	Ural Yekaterinburg	28	(0)
2024–	Spartak Moscow	38	(1)
2024–2025	→ Krylia Sovetov Samara (loan)	22	(3)

International career^{‡}
2021	Russia U18	3	(1)
2023	Russia U19	1	(0)
2023–	Russia U21	7	(2)
- * Club domestic league appearances and goals as of 1 November 2026 ‡ National team caps and goals as of 23 March 2025

Igor Sergeyevich Dmitriyev (Russian: Игорь Сергеевич Дмитриев; born 24 July 2004) is a Russian football player who plays as a left winger for Spartak Moscow.

== Career ==
On 22 June 2023, Dmitriyev signed with Russian Premier League club Ural Yekaterinburg.

He made his RPL debut for Ural on 22 July 2023 in a game against CSKA Moscow.

On 26 July 2024, Ural announced Dmitriyev's transfer to Spartak Moscow. Spartak announced the signing of a four-year contract with Dmitriyev on the same day. On 7 August 2024, Dmitriyev was loaned by Krylia Sovetov Samara. On 5 May 2026, Dmitriyev's contract with Spartak was extended to the summer of 2030.

== Personal life ==
He is the son of former footballer Sergey Dmitriyev (1964−2022) and former athlete Svetlana Laukhova (1973−2023).

== Career statistics ==
As of match played 1 November 2026

Club	Season	League			Cup		Other		Total	
Club	Season	Division	Apps	Goals	Apps	Goals	Apps	Goals	Apps	Goals
Leningradets	2020–21	Russian Second League	2	1	—		—		2	1
Leningradets	2021–22	Russian Second League	18	4	1	0	—		19	4
Leningradets	2022–23	Russian Second League	26	6	1	0	—		27	6
Leningradets	Total		46	11	2	0	0	0	48	11
Ural Yekaterinburg	2023–24	Russian Premier League	26	0	8	0	1 (Note: Appearance in the relegation play-offs)	0	35	0
Ural Yekaterinburg	2024–25	Russian First League	2	0	0	0	—		2	0
Ural Yekaterinburg	Total		28	0	8	0	1	0	37	0
Krylia Sovetov Samara (loan)	2024–25	Russian Premier League	22	3	5	0	—		27	3
Spartak Moscow	2025–26	Russian Premier League	25	1	11	1	—		36	2
Spartak Moscow	2026–27	Russian Premier League	13	0	5	1	1 (Note: Appearance in Russian Super Cup)	0	19	1
Spartak Moscow	Total		38	1	16	2	1	0	55	3
Career total			134	15	31	2	2	0	167	17

== Honours ==
Spartak Moscow

- Russian Cup: 2025–26
