= Aleksei Kashtanov =

Russian footballer

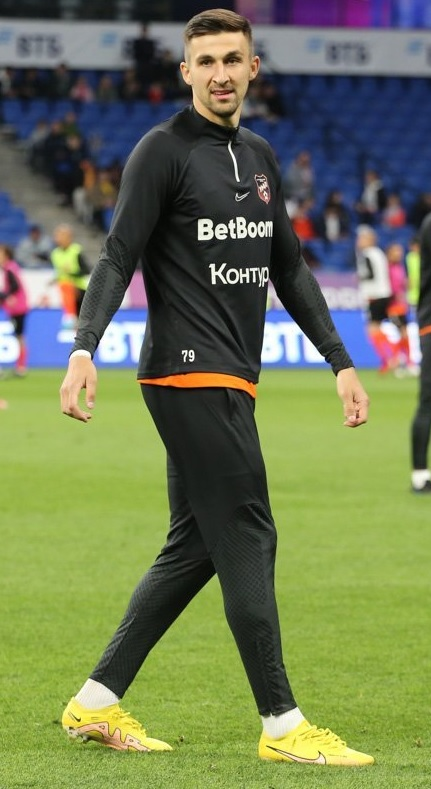
- Kashtanov with Ural in 2022

Personal information
- Full name: Aleksei Dmitriyevich Kashtanov
- Date of birth: 13 March 1996 (age 30)
- Place of birth: Dyatkovo, Russia
- Height: 1.96 m (6 ft 5 in)
- Position: Forward

Team information
- Current team: Torpedo Moscow
- Number: 79

Youth career
- 2004–2012: Dynamo Bryansk
- 2013: Syroezhkin SDYuShOR Bronnitsy
- 2014: Vityaz Podolsk

Senior career*
| Years | Team | Apps | (Gls) |
| 2015–2016 | Kaluga | 13 | (1) |
| 2016 | Mebelshchik Dyatkovo (amateur) | | |
| 2017 | Kvant Obninsk (amateur) | | |
| 2018 | Mebelshchik Dyatkovo (amateur) | | |
| 2018–2019 | Kvant Obninsk | 8 | (1) |
| 2019 | Kyzyltash Bakhchisaray | | |
| 2019 | Mebelshchik Dyatkovo (amateur) | | |
| 2020 | Rosich Moscow oblast (amateur) | | |
| 2021–2022 | Rodina Moscow | 20 | (7) |
| 2021–2022 | → Volga Ulyanovsk (loan) | 20 | (13) |
| 2022 | → Ural Yekaterinburg (loan) | 16 | (5) |
| 2023–2025 | Ural Yekaterinburg | 49 | (7) |
| 2024–2025 | → Fakel Voronezh (loan) | 23 | (2) |
| 2025– | Torpedo Moscow | 24 | (3) |
- * Club domestic league appearances and goals as of 16 May 2026

Aleksei Dmitriyevich Kashtanov (Russian: Алексей Дмитриевич Каштанов; born 13 March 1996) is a Russian football player who plays for Torpedo Moscow.

== Club career ==
He made his debut in the Russian Professional Football League for Kaluga on 20 July 2015 in a game against Arsenal-2 Tula.

He made his debut in the Russian Premier League for Ural Yekaterinburg on 16 July 2022 in a game against CSKA Moscow. On 30 December 2022, Kashtanov moved to Ural on a permanent basis after playing on loan.

On 29 August 2024, Kashtanov was loaned by Fakel Voronezh, with an option to buy. He left Fakel on 26 May 2025.

== Career statistics ==
As of 24 May 2025

Appearances and goals by club, season and competition
| Club | Season | League | | | Cup | | Europe | | Other | | Total | |
| Club | Season | Division | Apps | Goals | Apps | Goals | Apps | Goals | Apps | Goals | Apps | Goals |
|---|---|---|---|---|---|---|---|---|---|---|---|---|
| Kaluga | 2015–16 | Russian Second League | 13 | 1 | 0 | 0 | — | | — | | 13 | 1 |
| Kvant Obninsk | 2018–19 | Russian Second League | 8 | 1 | 0 | 0 | — | | — | | 8 | 1 |
| Rodina Moscow | 2020–21 | Russian Second League | 13 | 5 | — | | — | | — | | 13 | 5 |
| Rodina Moscow | 2021–22 | Russian Second League | 7 | 2 | 1 | 0 | — | | — | | 8 | 2 |
| Rodina Moscow | Total | | 20 | 7 | 1 | 0 | — | | — | | 21 | 7 |
| Volga Ulyanovsk (loan) | 2021–22 | Russian Second League | 20 | 13 | — | | — | | — | | 20 | 13 |
| Ural Yekaterinburg (loan) | 2022–23 | Russian Premier League | 16 | 5 | 5 | 1 | — | | — | | 21 | 6 |
| Ural Yekaterinburg | 2022–23 | Russian Premier League | 12 | 0 | 6 | 1 | — | | — | | 18 | 1 |
| Ural Yekaterinburg | 2023–24 | Russian Premier League | 26 | 6 | 7 | 2 | — | | 2 (Note: Appearances in the relegation play-offs) | 0 | 35 | 8 |
| Ural Yekaterinburg | 2024–25 | Russian Premier League | 6 | 0 | 0 | 0 | — | | — | | 6 | 0 |
| Ural Yekaterinburg | Total | | 44 | 6 | 13 | 3 | — | | 2 | 0 | 59 | 9 |
| Fakel Voronezh (loan) | 2024–25 | Russian Premier League | 23 | 2 | 2 | 0 | — | | — | | 25 | 2 |
| Career total | | | 144 | 35 | 21 | 4 | 0 | 0 | 2 | 0 | 167 | 39 |
