= Emiliano Garré =

Argentine footballer

Emiliano Garré (born 10 November 1981 in Buenos Aires, Argentina) is an Argentine former professional footballer who played as a midfielder.

== Personal life ==
He is the second son of the Argentine coach Oscar Garré and is the brother of Argentine footballer Ezequiel Garré.

== Clubs ==
- Huracán 1996–1998
- Campomaiorense 1999
- Huachipato 2000–2002
- Audax Italiano 2003
- Chacarita Juniors 2004–2005
- Luján 2006–2012
