= Nikita Khlusov =

Russian footballer (born 2000)

Personal information
- Full name: Nikita Nikolayevich Khlusov
- Date of birth: 16 January 2000 (age 26)
- Place of birth: Saint Petersburg, Russia
- Height: 1.84 m (6 ft 0 in)
- Position: Forward

Team information
- Current team: Dynamo St. Petersburg
- Number: 99

Youth career
- –2012: Moskovskaya Zastava St. Petersburg
- 2012–2018: Zenit Saint Petersburg

Senior career*
Years	Team	Apps	(Gls)
2018–2022	Leningradets Leningrad Oblast	77	(17)
2022–2024	Krylia Sovetov Samara	0	(0)
2023	→ Dnepr Mogilev (loan)	15	(2)
2024	→ Zvezda St. Petersburg (loan)	10	(2)
2025–	Dynamo St. Petersburg	21	(1)

International career^{‡}
2017	Russia U18	4	(2)
- * Club domestic league appearances and goals as of 1 November 2026 ‡ National team caps and goals as of 26 August 2017

Nikita Nikolayevich Khlusov (Russian: Никита Николаевич Хлусов; born 16 January 2000) is a Russian footballer who plays as a forward for Dynamo St. Petersburg.

== Club career ==
Khlusov made his debut for Krylia Sovetov Samara on 30 August 2022 in a Russian Cup game against Spartak Moscow.

On 27 July 2023, Khlusov joined Dnepr Mogilev in Belarus on loan until the end of 2023.

== Career statistics ==
As of 27 November 2022

Appearances and goals by club, season and competition
Club	Season	League			Cup		Continental		Total	
Club	Season	Division	Apps	Goals	Apps	Goals	Apps	Goals	Apps	Goals
Leningradets	2018–19	Second League	22	3	1	0	–		23	3
Leningradets	2019–20	Second League	17	7	3	0	–		20	7
Leningradets	2020–21	Second League	17	5	3	1	–		20	6
Leningradets	2021–22	Second League	21	2	4	2	–		25	4
Leningradets	Total		77	17	11	3	0	0	88	20
Krylia Sovetov Samara	2022–23	RPL	0	0	1	0	–		1	0
Career total			77	17	12	3	0	0	89	20
