= Franco Orozco =

Argentine footballer (born 2002)

Personal information
- Date of birth: 9 January 2002 (age 24)
- Place of birth: Ezeiza, Argentina
- Height: 1.68 m (5 ft 6 in)
- Position: Left winger

Team information
- Current team: Asteras Tripolis (on loan from Lanús)
- Number: 19

Youth career
- Lanús

Senior career*
Years	Team	Apps	(Gls)
2020–	Lanús	83	(8)
2024	→ Krylia Sovetov Samara (loan)	22	(4)
2025–2026	→ Newell's Old Boys (loan)	10	(0)
2026–	→ Asteras Tripolis (loan)	3	(0)

International career^{‡}
- Argentina U15
2018	Argentina U16	1	(0)
2019	Argentina U17	12	(4)
- * Club domestic league appearances and goals as of 22:00, 7 September 2026 (UTC) ‡ National team caps and goals as of 3 November 2019

Franco Orozco (born 9 January 2002) is an Argentine professional footballer who plays as a left winger for Super League Greece club Asteras Tripolis, on loan from Lanús.

== Club career ==
Orozco progressed through the Lanús youth system. He was promoted into the club's senior squad under manager Luis Zubeldía towards the end of 2020, initially featuring in pre-season action which saw him score in a win over Gimnasia y Esgrima on 21 October. A week later, Orozco made his competitive first-team debut in a 3–2 victory over São Paulo in the Copa Sudamericana; replacing Braian Aguirre early in the second half. The winger did the same on 31 October in a Copa de la Liga Profesional loss at home to Boca Juniors. He scored his first senior goal at the Estadio Mario Alberto Kempes against Talleres on 9 November.

Orozco scored twice in a Copa Sudamericana round of sixteen second leg victory over Bolívar on 2 December 2020. After further Copa de la Liga goals against Newell's Old Boys and Rosario Central, the winger netted on his Copa Argentina debut on 23 February against Primera C Metropolitana's Real Pilar.

On 22 February 2024, Orozco moved to Russian Premier League club Krylia Sovetov Samara on loan until the end of 2024, with an option to buy. On 9 December 2024, Krylia Sovetov announced that Orozco returned to Lanús as loan expired and the option to buy was not exercised.

On 6 July 2026, Orozco joined Greek side Asteras Tripolis on a yearly loan.

== International career ==
Orozco represented Argentina at U15 and U17 level; appearing in over thirty matches in total. For the U15s, he scored one goal (versus Paraguay) as they won the 2017 South American U-15 Championship on home soil. For the U17s, Orozco scored two goals in his sole appearance at the 2019 FIFA U-17 World Cup against Tajikistan; having played seven times earlier that year at the South American U-17 Championship in Peru.

== Career statistics ==
As of match played 28 October 2024.

Appearances and goals by club, season and competition
Club	Season	League			Cup		Continental		Other		Total	
Club	Season	Division	Apps	Goals	Apps	Goals	Apps	Goals	Apps	Goals	Apps	Goals
Lanús	2020–21 (Note: Soccerway counts 2020 Copa de la Liga Profesional appearances as league appearances.)	Argentine Primera División	9	3	11	3	5 (Note: Appearance(s) in the Copa Sudamericana)	2	0	0	25	8
Lanús	2021 (Note: Soccerway counts 2021 Copa de la Liga Profesional appearances as league appearances.)	Argentine Primera División	14	0	1	1	5	0	0	0	20	1
Lanús	2022 (Note: Soccerway counts 2022 Copa de la Liga Profesional appearances as league appearances.)	Argentine Primera División	27	1	2	2	2	0	—		31	3
Lanús	2023 (Note: Soccerway counts 2023 Copa de la Liga Profesional appearances as league appearances.)	Argentine Primera División	27	4	0	0	—		—		27	4
Lanús	Total		77	8	14	6	12	2	0	0	103	16
Krylia Sovetov Samara (loan)	2023–24	Russian Premier League	12	1	—		—		—		12	1
Krylia Sovetov Samara (loan)	2024–25	Russian Premier League	10	3	4	0	—		—		14	3
Krylia Sovetov Samara (loan)	Total		22	4	4	0	—		—		26	4
Career total			99	12	18	6	12	2	0	0	129	20

== Honours ==
Argentina U15

- South American U-15 Championship: 2017
