= Nikita Saltykov =

Russian footballer

Personal information
- Full name: Nikita Andreyevich Saltykov
- Date of birth: 11 August 2004 (age 22)
- Place of birth: Mytishchi, Russia
- Height: 1.75 m (5 ft 9 in)
- Position: Left winger

Team information
- Current team: Krylia Sovetov Samara (on loan from Lokomotiv Moscow)
- Number: 14

Youth career
- 2011–2014: DYuSSh-5 Volgodonsk
- 2015–2018: SSh TsDYuS Mytishchi
- 2018–2019: UOR-5 Yegoryevsk
- 2019–2020: Chertanovo Education Center

Senior career*
Years	Team	Apps	(Gls)
2021–2022	Chertanovo Moscow	9	(0)
2022–2024	Krylia Sovetov Samara	17	(4)
2022–2023	→ Zvezda Saint Petersburg (loan)	22	(2)
2023	→ Akron Tolyatti (loan)	14	(1)
2024–	Lokomotiv Moscow	22	(0)
2024	→ Krylia Sovetov Samara (loan)	12	(0)
2026–	→ Krylia Sovetov Samara (loan)	7	(0)

International career^{‡}
2019–2020	Russia U-16	12	(0)
2021	Russia U-18	5	(1)
2023	Russia U-23	2	(0)
2024–	Russia U-21	9	(2)
- * Club domestic league appearances and goals as of 8 November 2026 ‡ National team caps and goals as of 18 November 2025

Nikita Andreyevich Saltykov (Russian: Ники́та Андре́евич Салтыко́в; born 11 August 2004) is a Russian football player who plays as a left winger for Krylia Sovetov Samara on loan from Lokomotiv Moscow.

== Club career ==
Saltykov made his debut for Krylia Sovetov Samara on 26 July 2023 in a Russian Cup game against Baltika Kaliningrad. He made his Russian Premier League debut on 29 July 2023 against FC Dynamo Moscow. In his next game and the first start on 5 August 2023 against Rostov, Saltykov scored twice in a 5–1 Krylia Sovetov victory.

On 10 January 2024, Saltykov signed a contract with Lokomotiv Moscow until January 2028 and was loaned back to Krylia Sovetov until the end of the 2023–24 season.

On 10 September 2026, Saltykov returned to Krylia Sovetov on a new season-long loan. Prior to the loan, he extended his Lokomotiv contract to June 2029.

== International career ==
Saltykov was first called up to the Russia national football team for September 2023 camp.

== Career statistics ==
As of match played 8 November 2026

Appearances and goals by club, season and competition
Club	Season	League			Cup		Total	
Club	Season	Division	Apps	Goals	Apps	Goals	Apps	Goals
Chertanovo Moscow	2021–22	Russian Second League	9	0	—		9	0
Krylya Sovetov Samara	2021–22	Russian Premier League	0	0	0	0	0	0
Krylya Sovetov Samara	2023–24	Russian Premier League	17	4	4	0	21	4
Krylya Sovetov Samara	Total		17	4	4	0	21	4
Zvezda Saint Petersburg (loan)	2021–22	Russian Second League	12	2	—		12	2
Zvezda Saint Petersburg (loan)	2022–23	Russian Second League	10	0	2	0	12	0
Zvezda Saint Petersburg (loan)	Total		22	2	2	0	24	0
Akron Tolyatti (loan)	2022–23	Russian First League	14	1	3	1	17	2
Krylya Sovetov Samara (loan)	2023–24	Russian Premier League	12	0	—		12	0
Lokomotiv Moscow	2024–25	Russian Premier League	6	0	5	0	11	0
Lokomotiv Moscow	2025–26	Russian Premier League	10	0	6	0	16	0
Lokomotiv Moscow	2026–27	Russian Premier League	6	0	2	0	8	0
Lokomotiv Moscow	Total		22	0	13	0	35	0
Krylya Sovetov Samara (loan)	2026–27	Russian Premier League	7	0	2	0	9	0
Krylya Sovetov Samara (loan)	Club total		36	4	6	0	42	4
Career total			103	7	24	1	127	8

== Honours ==
Individual

- Russian Premier League Young Player of the Season: 2023–24.
