= Kiryl Pyachenin =

Belarusian footballer (born 1997)

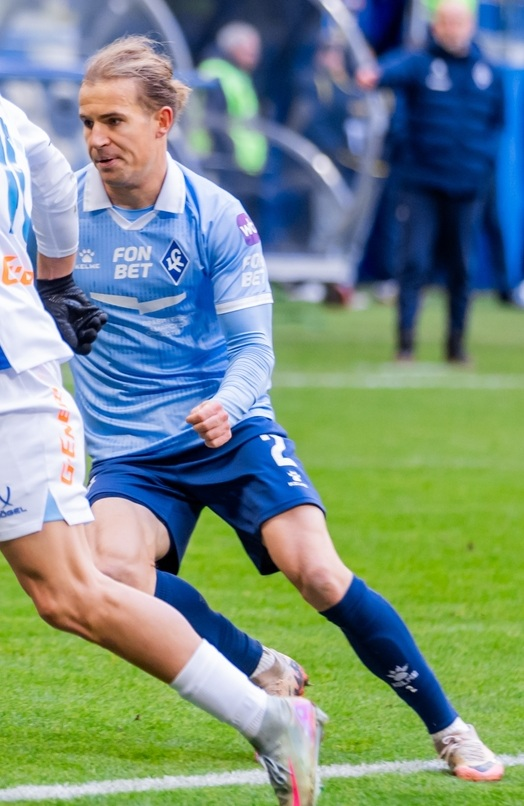
- Pyachenin with Krylia Sovetov in 2025

Personal information
- Date of birth: 18 March 1997 (age 29)
- Place of birth: Vitebsk, Belarus
- Height: 1.76 m (5 ft 9 1/2 in)
- Position: Left-back

Team information
- Current team: Krylia Sovetov Samara
- Number: 2

Youth career
- 2015–2016: Vitebsk

Senior career*
Years	Team	Apps	(Gls)
2016–2019	Vitebsk	58	(5)
2017	→ Orsha (loan)	11	(0)
2017	→ Naftan Novopolotsk (loan)	13	(1)
2020	Dynamo Brest	23	(1)
2021	Rukh Brest	27	(2)
2022–2023	Orenburg	35	(0)
2024–	Krylia Sovetov Samara	84	(3)
2025	Krylia Sovetov-2 Samara	1	(0)

International career^{‡}
2017–2018	Belarus U21	13	(0)
2017	Belarus B	1	(0)
2019–	Belarus	53	(0)
- * Club domestic league appearances and goals as of 20 November 2026 ‡ National team caps and goals as of 15 November 2026

Kiryl Pyachenin (Belarusian: Кірыл Пячэнін; Russian: Кирилл Печенин; born 18 March 1997) is a Belarusian professional footballer who plays as a left-back for Russian club Krylia Sovetov Samara as well as the Belarus national team.

== Club career ==
On 12 January 2024, Pyachenin's contract with Orenburg was terminated by mutual consent.

On 21 February 2024, Pyachenin signed a 2.5-year contract with Krylia Sovetov Samara. In early 2026, Pyachenin extended his contract with Krylia Sovetov until June 2029.

== Career statistics ==
=== Club ===
As of match played 20 November 2026

Appearances and goals by club, season and competition
Club	Season	League			Cup		Europe		Other		Total	
Club	Season	Division	Apps	Goals	Apps	Goals	Apps	Goals	Apps	Goals	Apps	Goals
Orsha	2017	Belarusian First League	11	0	2	0	—		—		13	0
Naftan Novopolotsk	2017	Belarusian Premier League	13	1	0	0	—		—		13	1
Vitebsk	2018	Belarusian Premier League	29	3	2	0	—		—		31	3
Vitebsk	2019	Belarusian Premier League	29	2	7	1	2 (Note: Appearances in the UEFA Europa League)	0	—		38	3
Vitebsk	Total		58	5	9	1	2	0	—		69	6
Dynamo Brest	2020	Belarusian Premier League	23	1	4	0	4 (Note: Three appearances, one goal in the UEFA Champions League, one appearance in the UEFA Europa League)	1	1 (Note: Appearance in the Belarusian Super Cup)	0	32	2
Rukh Brest	2021	Belarusian Premier League	27	2	2	0	—		—		29	2
Orenburg	2021–22	Russian First League	10	0	—		—		0	0	10	0
Orenburg	2022–23	Russian Premier League	19	0	3	0	—		—		22	0
Orenburg	2023–24	Russian Premier League	6	0	3	0	—		—		9	0
Orenburg	Total		35	0	6	0	—		—		41	0
Krylia Sovetov Samara	2023–24	Russian Premier League	12	0	—		—		—		12	0
Krylia Sovetov Samara	2024–25	Russian Premier League	27	2	5	0	—		—		32	2
Krylia Sovetov Samara	2025–26	Russian Premier League	30	1	10	0	—		—		40	1
Krylia Sovetov Samara	2026–27	Russian Premier League	15	0	3	0	—		—		18	0
Krylia Sovetov Samara	Total		84	3	18	0	—		—		102	3
Krylia Sovetov-2 Samara	2025	Russian Second League B	1	0	—		—		—		1	0
Career total			251	12	41	1	6	1	1	0	299	14

=== International ===
As of match played 15 November 2026

Appearances and goals by national team and year
National team	Year	Apps	Goals
Belarus	2019	1	0
Belarus	2020	6	0
Belarus	2021	4	0
Belarus	2022	7	0
Belarus	2023	7	0
Belarus	2024	9	0
Belarus	2025	9	0
Belarus	2026	10	0
Total		53	0

== Honours ==
Dinamo Brest

- Belarusian Super Cup winner: 2020
