= Solidarnost Samara Arena =

Football stadium in Samara, Russia

- Samara Arena
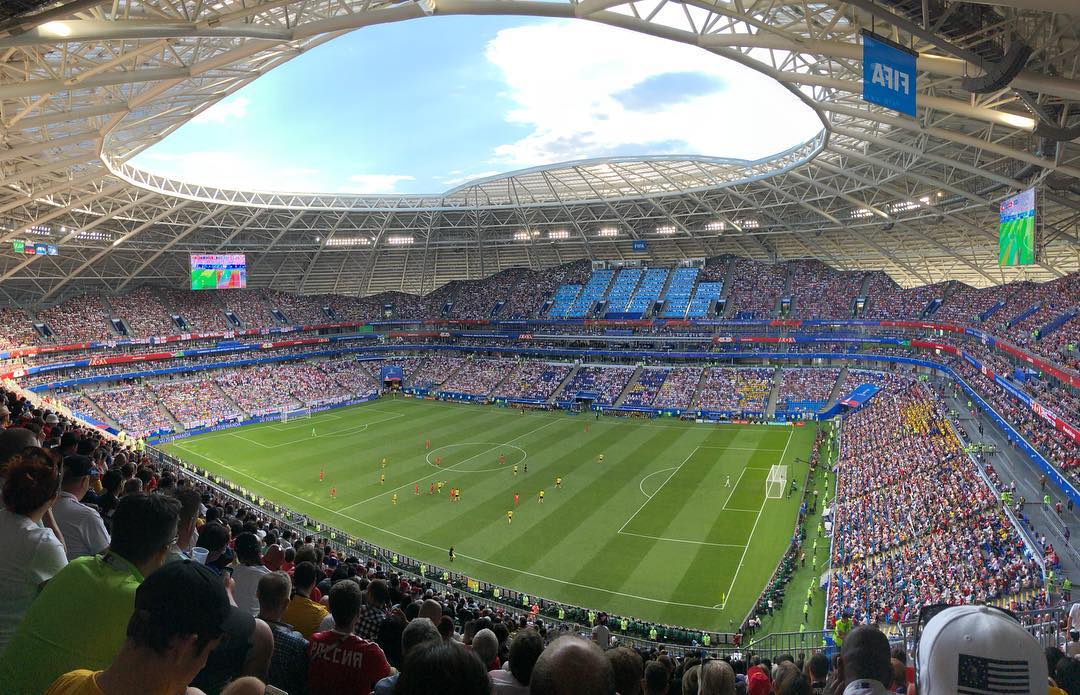
- UEFA
- Interactive map of Solidarnost Samara Arena
- Full name: Solidarnost Samara Arena
- Location: Ulitsa Dal'nyaya, Samara, Russia
- Coordinates: 53°16′40″N 50°14′14″E
- Owner: Samara Oblast Government
- Operator: FC Krylia Sovetov Samara; FC Akron Tolyatti
- Capacity: 44,918 (Official); 41,970 (2018 FIFA World Cup)
- Surface: SISGrass (Hybrid grass)
- Field size: 105 × 68 m

Construction
- Groundbreaking: 2014
- Built: 2014–2017
- Opened: 28 April 2018
- Cost: $320 million

Tenants
- FC Krylia Sovetov Samara (2018–present); FC Akron Tolyatti (2024-present)

Solidarnost Samara Arena (Russian: «Солидарность Самара Арена»), also known as the Samara Arena, Cosmos Arena, is a football stadium in Samara, Russia. The stadium was one of the venues for the 2018 FIFA World Cup. It also hosts FC Krylia Sovetov Samara of the Russian Premier League, replacing Metallurg Stadium. It has a capacity of 44,918 spectators. Samara authorities announced their design tender in late 2012 with cost estimated at $320 million.

Local fans also know it as Sorokin Khutor (Arena, located near the hamlet of the same name), often shortened to Sokhuar.

== History ==
The stadium design was approved (re-approved) by Glavgosexpertiza of Russia on 19 July 2017. In 2019 the stadium was second in a popular vote for the Stadium of the Year.

== Description ==
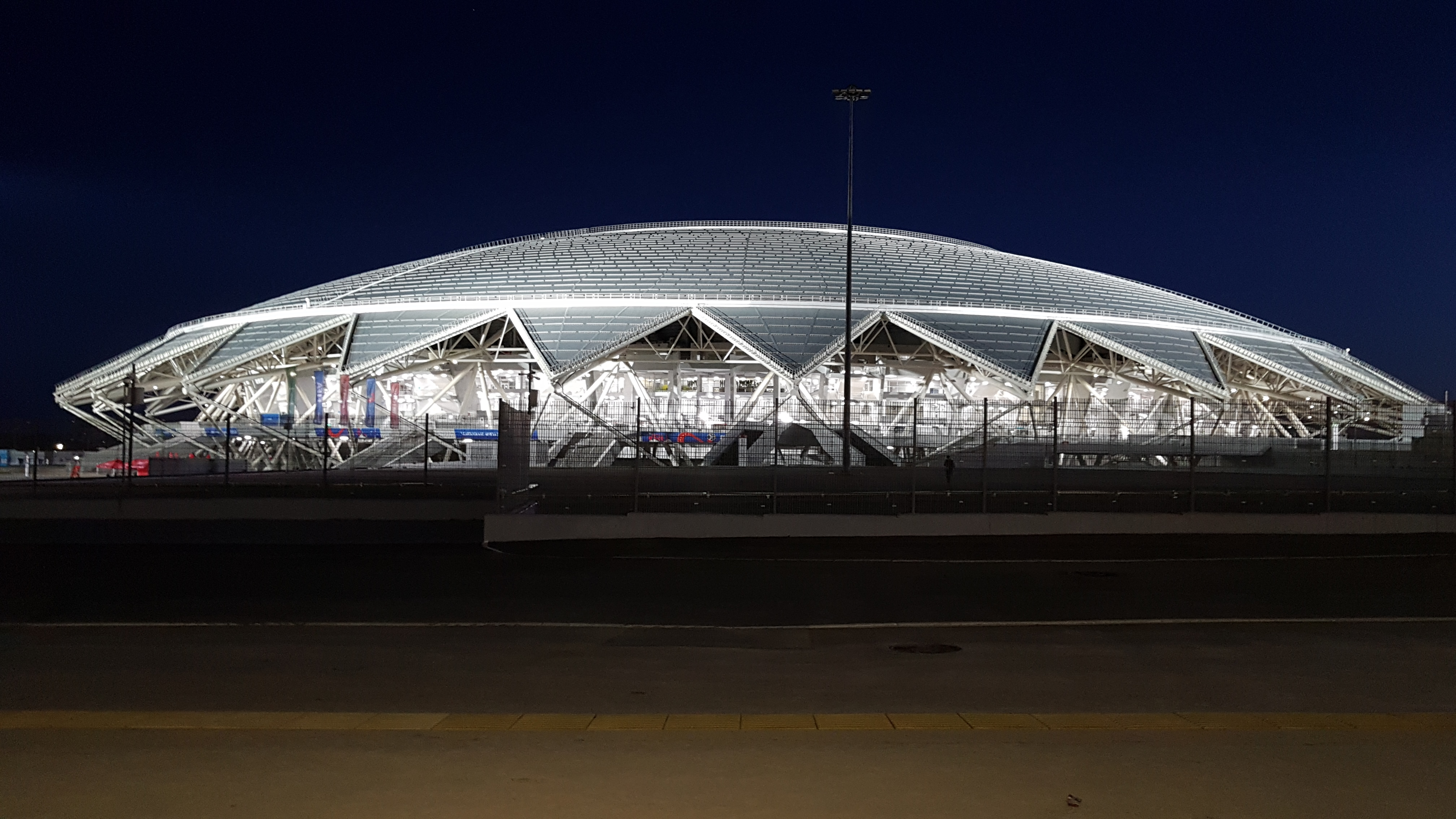
Exterior view of the stadium.

General characteristics

- Stadium grounds: 27 ha
- Diameter: 330m
- Total capacity: 44,918 spectators
- VIP box capacity: 1,125 spectators
- Premium seats: 75
- Total area: 160,498.10 m^{2}
- Total structural volume: 503,480 m^{3}
- Height: 60 m
- Stadium arena: 2 levels of open stands, 2 levels of skyboxes
- Construction cost: 18.9 (20.7) billion rubles
- Developer: Sport-Engineering
- General designer: GUS SO TerrNIIgrazhdanproekt, PI Arena
- Design contractors: Arena Design Institute, SODIS LAB, etc.

The main architectural feature of the stadium in Samara is its metal dome inspired by space exploration. Covering the entire stadium, it is supported by beam-like structures from below, with the overall silhouette resembling a star or a spacecraft. The dome itself has a minimal curve, rising above as a nearly flat surface. The elliptical foundation of the stadium supports two levels of spectator seats. The seats are completely covered by the roof. The stands in the stadium are heated. The stadium has a diameter of about 330 m exceeding that of the Luzhniki Stadium in Moscow. The dome of the stadium is an assembled structure of 32 cantilevers resting on 21.4 m high pyramidal legs. The total weight of the arena roof is 13,000 tons. The total area of the roof is 76,000 m^{2}. The stadium height is 60 m. The Arena's foundation is a monolithic reinforced concrete slab. The total volume of concrete used for construction of the monolithic structures is more than 230,000 cubic meters.

The stadium was awarded the BREEAM certificate and was praised by the international company JLL for its energy conservation and ecology. UEFA rated the stadium as Category Four stadium, the highest category.

== Location ==
In the initial bid submitted to FIFA the new stadium was to be built on an island south of the city, where almost no settlements or infrastructure exist. There wasn't even a bridge leading there at that time.

This caused criticism and so the stadium was relocated up north, to be built within city limits. Initially its area was planned to be 27 ha, but it was changed to 240 ha, and then up to 930 ha The decision to enlarge the complex area was taken before any consultation with Samara residents. Most of the constructions planned on the enlarged area had no relation to sports.

The Arena is located in the North-Western part of Samara, between Dalnyaya and Arena 2018 Streets and Moskovskoye Highway. The stadium is located at the highest point of the city. The distance from the railway station to the stadium is 15 km, from the Kurumoch Airport to the stadium, 32 km.

Bordering the stadium in the south is a high-density residential neighbourhood, Volga microdistrict, the construction of which began in 1978 and reached its peak by the mid-1980s. The microdistrict was constructed on the territory of the village Yablonka, which as a farm, is known from the end of the 19th century. The first residents of the village were settlers from the central regions of Russia, Ukraine and Poland. Even under Soviet rule, people who "were caught in a religious dope" were also sent here. In 1930, the inhabitants of the village organized the collective farm "Iskra". Nowadays Yablonka occupies the territory within the streets of Tashkentskaya, Demokraticheskaya and the Radio Center. What remains of the original village consists, besides low density houses, cemetery and Shishiga Lake (Russian: озеро «Шишига»), gradually turning into a dump of domestic and construction waste.

The area south-west of the stadium is called Radio center No.3, originally called Radio Center. It was built in 1949. The choice of place is not accidental as at that time it was the highest point in the city. Broadcast on short waves here was started in 1952. At the Radio center, the town of the same name appeared, in which the specialists who worked there lived. Despite its more than modest size, in its infrastructure there was a place for a small House of Culture and a school. The center of culture had closed, and now the building is empty. The school operated until 1981, after which its school housed a cycling school.

== 2018 FIFA World Cup ==
=== Matches ===
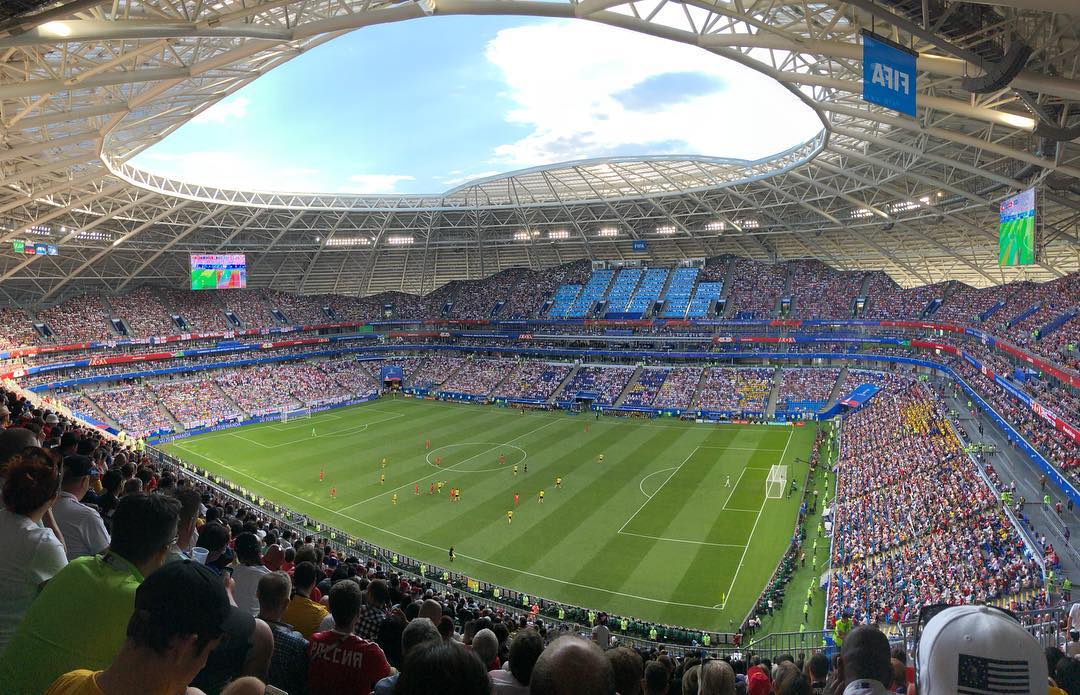
Game World Cup Sweden-England, 7 July 2018.

Date	Time	Team No. 1	Result	Team No. 2	Round	Attendance
17 June 2018	16:00 SAMT (UTC+4)	Costa Rica	0–1	Serbia	Group E	41,432
21 June 2018	16:00 SAMT (UTC+4)	Denmark	1–1	Australia	Group C	40,727
25 June 2018	18:00 SAMT (UTC+4)	Uruguay	3–0	Russia	Group A	41,970
28 June 2018	18:00 SAMT (UTC+4)	Senegal	0–1	Colombia	Group H	41,970
2 July 2018	18:00 SAMT (UTC+4)	Brazil	2–0	Mexico	Round of 16	41,970
7 July 2018	18:00 SAMT (UTC+4)	Sweden	0–2	England	Quarter-finals	39,991

=== Services for fans ===
The following services are available to fans visiting the Samara Arena:

- Navigation and information support from volunteers.
- Information (children registration point, stroller storage, lost and found office).
- Storage room.
- Audio descriptive commentary for fans who are blind or visually impaired.

Seating options include non-standard seats for plus-size spectators. The stadium stands include special observation areas for people with disabilities, which offer the space for wheelchairs and accompanying persons.

=== Conditions for spectators with disabilities ===
To ensure accessibility, the stands are equipped with elevators (38 total) adapted for people with disabilities. For the comfort of people with limited mobility, all areas with difference in elevation have ramps with non-slip surfaces and safety railings and doorways are made extra wide and without doorsteps. To assist spectators who are visually impaired, the stadium makes use of tactile paving. Navigation at the stadium is supported by special signs and markings, including those for spectators with vision and hearing impairment. Shelves in food outlets are designed at a lower level for the comfort of spectators with disabilities. The same design is used at registration stands and retail locations. In case of fire, each floor in each sector has special safety areas for people in wheelchairs where they can wait for the arrival of EMERCOM emergency response teams. This solution makes sure that people with limited mobility do not get trampled during evacuation when large numbers of fans would be leaving the stadium. The building has more than 70 toilets that are made accessible to people with disabilities. In case of emergency, people with limited mobility can call for help using emergency buttons in elevators, toilets and special premises.

=== Safety and security ===
By the opening of the 2018 FIFA World Cup, the stadium will be equipped with alarm and public alert systems, metal detectors, indicators of hazardous liquids and explosives, and it will be serviced by 30 24-hour security posts.

== After FIFA World Cup 2018 ==
The owner of the stadium is the Samara Oblast Government. It is operated by PFC Krylia Sovetov Samara, the native football club. In 2020 the government launched an international competition to submit their designs for the development of the stadium and surrounding area.
