= Dmitri Pivovarov =

Russian footballer

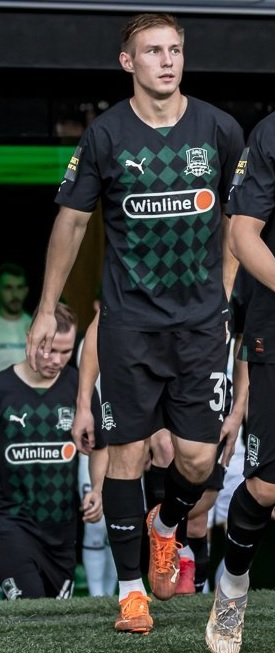
- Pivovarov with Krasnodar-2 in 2022

Personal information
- Full name: Dmitri Igorevich Pivovarov
- Date of birth: 21 March 2000 (age 26)
- Place of birth: Krasnoyarsk, Russia
- Height: 1.80 m (5 ft 11 in)
- Position: Left-back

Team information
- Current team: Saturn Ramenskoye
- Number: 20

Youth career
- 2018–2021: Krasnodar

Senior career*
Years	Team	Apps	(Gls)
2018	Krasnodar-2	12	(0)
2018–2021	Krasnodar-3	60	(3)
2021–2023	Krasnodar-2	45	(1)
2022–2026	Krasnodar	3	(0)
2023–2025	→ Chayka Peschanokopskoye (loan)	40	(1)
2026–	Saturn Ramenskoye	7	(0)
- * Club domestic league appearances and goals as of 31 October 2026

Dmitri Igorevich Pivovarov (Russian: Дмитрий Игоревич Пивоваров; born 21 March 2000) is a Russian football player who plays as a left-back for Saturn Ramenskoye.

== Club career ==
He made his debut in the Russian Football National League for Krasnodar-2 on 17 July 2021 in a game against Alania Vladikavkaz.

He made his Russian Premier League debut for Krasnodar on 8 May 2022 against Arsenal Tula.

== Career statistics ==
As of 24 May 2025

Club	Season	League			Cup		Continental		Other		Total	
Club	Season	Division	Apps	Goals	Apps	Goals	Apps	Goals	Apps	Goals	Apps	Goals
Krasnodar-2	2017–18	Russian Second League	12	0	–		–		1 (Note: Appearances in the FNL Cup)	0	13	0
Krasnodar-2	2021–22	Russian First League	23	0	–		–		–		23	0
Krasnodar-2	2022–23	Russian First League	19	1	–		–		–		19	1
Krasnodar-2	2023–24	Russian Second League A	3	0	–		–		–		3	0
Krasnodar-2	Total		57	1	0	0	0	0	1	0	58	1
Krasnodar-3	2018–19	Russian Second League	17	1	–		–		–		17	1
Krasnodar-3	2019–20	Russian Second League	14	0	–		–		–		14	0
Krasnodar-3	2020–21	Russian Second League	29	2	–		–		–		29	2
Krasnodar-3	Total		60	3	0	0	0	0	0	0	60	3
Krasnodar	2021–22	Russian Premier League	2	0	0	0	–		–		2	0
Krasnodar	2022–23	Russian Premier League	1	0	1	0	–		–		2	0
Krasnodar	Total		3	0	1	0	0	0	0	0	4	0
Chayka Peschanokopskoye (loan)	2023–24	Russian Second League A	24	1	0	0	–		–		24	1
Chayka Peschanokopskoye (loan)	2024–25	Russian First League	16	0	0	0	–		–		16	0
Chayka Peschanokopskoye (loan)	Total		40	1	0	0	0	0	0	0	40	1
Career total			160	5	1	0	0	0	1	0	162	5
