= Oleg Isayenko =

Russian footballer

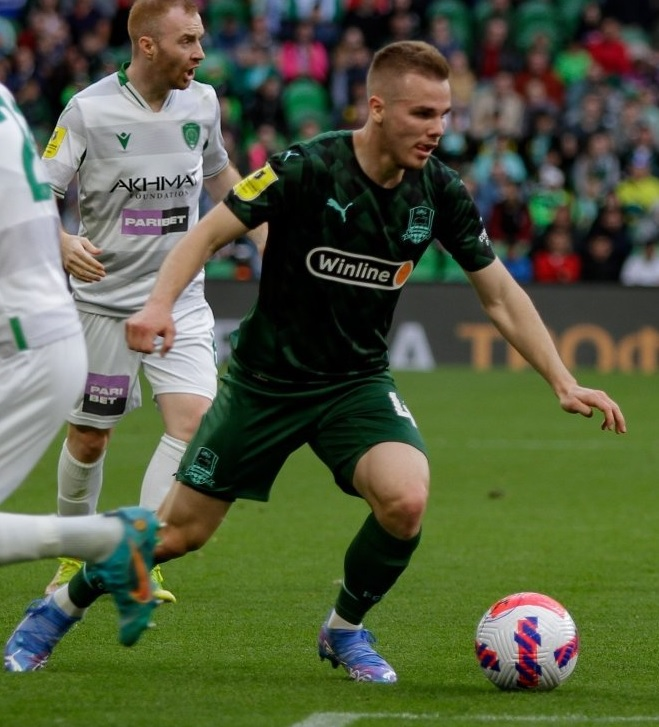
- Isayenko with Krasnodar in 2022

Personal information
- Full name: Oleg Igorevich Isayenko
- Date of birth: 31 January 2000 (age 26)
- Place of birth: Kaliningrad, Russia
- Height: 1.69 m (5 ft 7 in)
- Position: Right midfielder

Team information
- Current team: Arsenal Tula
- Number: 44

Youth career
- –2016: Yunost Kaliningrad
- 2016–2020: Krasnodar

Senior career*
Years	Team	Apps	(Gls)
2018–2023	Krasnodar-2	92	(2)
2018–2021	Krasnodar-3	36	(0)
2022–2023	Krasnodar	11	(0)
2023–2025	Khimki	30	(1)
2024–2025	→ Baltika Kaliningrad (loan)	12	(0)
2025–	Arsenal Tula	17	(0)
- * Club domestic league appearances and goals as of 16 May 2026

Oleg Igorevich Isayenko (Russian: Олег Игоревич Исаенко; born 31 January 2000) is a Russian football player who plays as a right midfielder for Arsenal Tula. He can also play as a right-back or left-back.

== Club career ==
He made his debut in the Russian Professional Football League for Krasnodar-2 on 17 March 2018 in a game against Biolog-Novokubansk. He made his Russian Football National League debut for Krasnodar-2 on 25 May 2019 in a game against Sibir Novosibirsk.

He made his Russian Premier League debut for Krasnodar on 9 April 2022 against Rubin Kazan.

On 23 June 2023, Isayenko moved to Khimki. On 12 September 2024, he was loaned to Baltika Kaliningrad.

== Career statistics ==
As of match played 31 July 2024

Appearances and goals by club, season and competition
Club	Season	League			Cup		Continental		Other		Total	
Club	Season	Division	Apps	Goals	Apps	Goals	Apps	Goals	Apps	Goals	Apps	Goals
Krasnodar-2	2017–18	Russian Second League	10	0	—		—		1 (Note: Appearances in the FNL Cup)	0	11	0
Krasnodar-2	2018–19	Russian First League	1	0	—		—		4	0	5	0
Krasnodar-2	2020–21	Russian First League	30	0	—		—		—		30	0
Krasnodar-2	2021–22	Russian First League	27	2	—		—		—		27	2
Krasnodar-2	2022–23	Russian First League	24	0	—		—		—		24	0
Krasnodar-2	Total		92	2	0	0	0	0	5	0	97	2
Krasnodar-3	2018–19	Russian Second League	22	0	—		—		—		22	0
Krasnodar-3	2019–20	Russian Second League	9	0	—		—		—		9	0
Krasnodar-3	2020–21	Russian Second League	5	0	—		—		—		5	0
Krasnodar-3	Total		36	0	0	0	0	0	0	0	36	0
Krasnodar	2021–22	Russian Premier League	8	0	0	0	—		—		8	0
Krasnodar	2022–23	Russian Premier League	3	0	1	0	—		—		4	0
Krasnodar	Total		11	0	1	0	0	0	0	0	12	0
Khimki	2023–24	Russian First League	29	1	3	1	—		—		32	2
Khimki	2024–25	Russian Premier League	1	0	1	0	—		—		2	0
Khimki	Total		30	1	4	1	—		—		34	2
Career total			169	3	5	1	0	0	5	0	179	4
