= Ruslan Apekov =

Russian football player

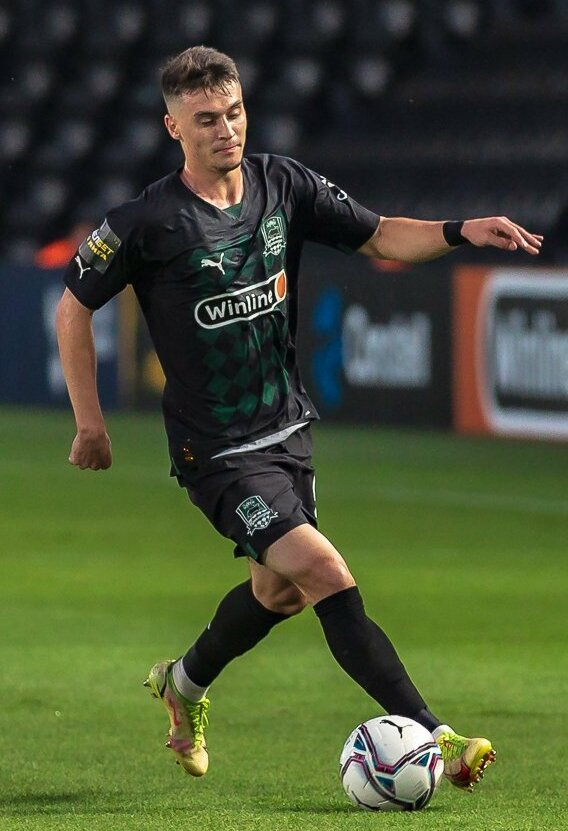
- Apekov with Krasnodar-2 in 2022

Personal information
- Full name: Ruslan Khazhismelovich Apekov
- Date of birth: 8 June 2000 (age 26)
- Place of birth: Nalchik, Russia
- Height: 1.76 m (5 ft 9 in)
- Position: Forward

Team information
- Current team: Torpedo Moscow
- Number: 11

Youth career
- –2013: Spartak Nalchik
- 2014–2021: Krasnodar

Senior career*
Years	Team	Apps	(Gls)
2018–2022	Krasnodar-2	83	(8)
2018–2021	Krasnodar-3	32	(7)
2021–2023	Krasnodar	7	(0)
2023	→ Akron Tolyatti (loan)	13	(2)
2023–2024	Akron Tolyatti	18	(0)
2023–2024	Akron-2 Tolyatti	1	(0)
2024	→ Leningradets (loan)	13	(2)
2024–2026	KAMAZ Naberezhnye Chelny	46	(11)
2026–	Torpedo Moscow	11	(3)
- * Club domestic league appearances and goals as of 16 May 2026

Ruslan Khazhismelovich Apekov (Russian: Руслан Хажисмелович Апеков; born 8 June 2000) is a Russian football player who plays for Torpedo Moscow.

== Club career ==
He made his debut in the Russian Professional Football League for Krasnodar-2 on 21 April 2018 in a game against Chernomorets Novorossiysk. He made his Russian Football National League debut for Krasnodar-2 on 7 September 2019 in a game against Spartak-2 Moscow.

He made his Russian Premier League debut for Krasnodar on 12 December 2021 against Nizhny Novgorod.

On 16 January 2023, Apekov joined Akron Tolyatti on loan until the end of the 2022–23 season, with an option to buy. On 8 June 2023, Akron activated the option and made the transfer permanent.

== Career statistics ==
As of 25 May 2024

Club	Season	League			Cup		Continental		Other		Total	
Club	Season	Division	Apps	Goals	Apps	Goals	Apps	Goals	Apps	Goals	Apps	Goals
Krasnodar-2	2017–18	Russian Second League	7	0	–		–		1 (Note: Appearances in the FNL Cup)	0	8	0
Krasnodar-2	2019–20	Russian First League	2	0	–		–		–		2	0
Krasnodar-2	2020–21	Russian First League	34	3	–		–		–		34	3
Krasnodar-2	2021–22	Russian First League	27	3	–		–		–		27	3
Krasnodar-2	2022–23	Russian First League	13	2	–		–		–		13	2
Krasnodar-2	Total		83	8	0	0	0	0	1	0	84	8
Krasnodar-3	2018–19	Russian Second League	24	2	–		–		–		24	2
Krasnodar-3	2019–20	Russian Second League	7	5	–		–		–		7	5
Krasnodar-3	2020–21	Russian Second League	1	0	–		–		–		1	0
Krasnodar-3	Total		32	7	0	0	0	0	0	0	32	7
Krasnodar	2021–22	Russian Premier League	5	0	0	0	–		–		5	0
Krasnodar	2022–23	Russian Premier League	2	0	0	0	–		–		2	0
Krasnodar	Total		7	0	0	0	0	0	0	0	7	0
Akron Tolyatti (loan)	2022–23	Russian First League	13	2	4	0	–		–		17	2
Akron Tolyatti	2023–24	Russian First League	18	0	3	1	–		–		21	1
Akron-2 Tolyatti	2023	Russian Second League B	1	0	–		–		–		1	0
Leningradets (loan)	2023–24	Russian First League	13	2	–		–		–		13	2
Career total			167	19	7	1	0	0	1	0	175	20
