= Vyacheslav Litvinov =

Russian footballer

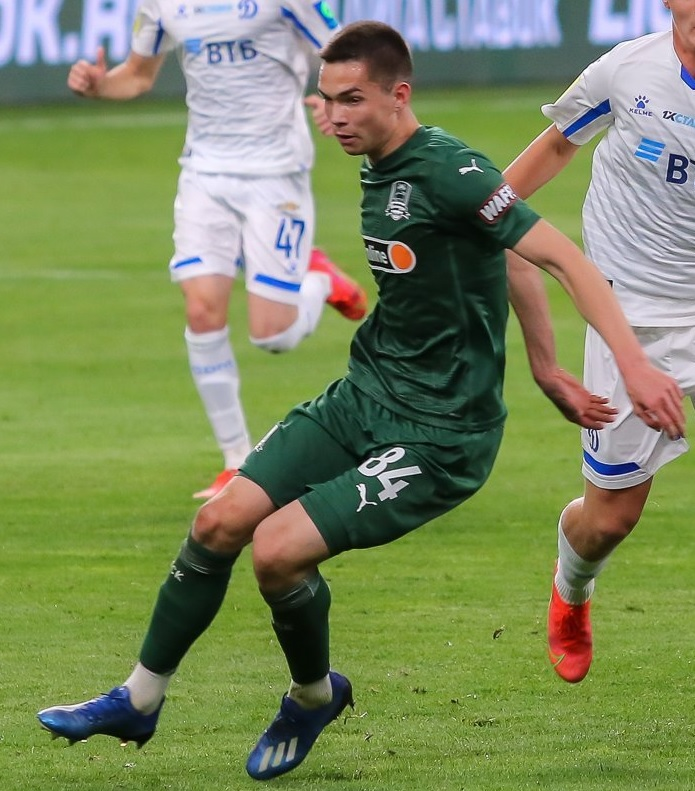
- Litvinov with FC Krasnodar in 2021

Personal information
- Full name: Vyacheslav Georgiyevich Litvinov
- Date of birth: 1 April 2001 (age 25)
- Place of birth: Anapa, Russia
- Height: 1.89 m (6 ft 2 in)
- Position: Centre-back

Team information
- Current team: Sochi
- Number: 4

Youth career
- FC Sauk-Dere
- 2018–2019: Krasnodar

Senior career*
Years	Team	Apps	(Gls)
2018–2023	Krasnodar-2	57	(3)
2020–2023	Krasnodar	27	(0)
2020	Krasnodar-3	1	(0)
2023–	Sochi	64	(0)

International career^{‡}
2018	Russia U18	8	(0)
- * Club domestic league appearances and goals as of 17 May 2026 ‡ National team caps and goals as of 16 October 2018

Vyacheslav Georgiyevich Litvinov (Russian: Вячеслав Георгиевич Литвинов; born 1 April 2001) is a Russian football player who plays as a centre back for Sochi.

== Club career ==
He made his debut in the Russian Football National League for Krasnodar-2 on 10 March 2020 in a game against Chertanovo Moscow. He started the match and played a full game. He made his Russian Premier League debut for Krasnodar on 31 October 2020 in a game against Akhmat Grozny, as a starter.

On 14 June 2023, Litvinov moved to Sochi.

== International career ==
Litvinov was first called up to the Russia national football team for a training camp in September 2023.

== Career statistics ==
As of match played 17 May 2026

Appearances and goals by club, season and competition
Club	Season	League			Cup		Europe		Other		Total	
Club	Season	Division	Apps	Goals	Apps	Goals	Apps	Goals	Apps	Goals	Apps	Goals
Krasnodar-2	2018–19	Russian First League	0	0	—		—		—		0	0
Krasnodar-2	2019–20	Russian First League	1	0	—		—		—		1	0
Krasnodar-2	2020–21	Russian First League	25	1	—		—		—		25	1
Krasnodar-2	2021–22	Russian First League	26	1	—		—		—		26	1
Krasnodar-2	2022–23	Russian First League	5	1	—		—		—		5	1
Krasnodar-2	Total		57	3	0	0	0	0	—		57	3
Krasnodar	2020–21	Russian Premier League	2	0	0	0	0	0	—		2	0
Krasnodar	2021–22	Russian Premier League	7	0	1	0	—		—		8	0
Krasnodar	2022–23	Russian Premier League	18	0	8	2	—		—		26	2
Krasnodar	Total		27	0	9	2	0	0	0	0	36	2
Krasnodar-3	2019–20	Russian Second League	0	0	—		—		—		0	0
Krasnodar-3	2020–21	Russian Second League	1	0	—		—		—		1	0
Krasnodar-3	Total		1	0	0	0	0	0	—		1	0
Sochi	2023–24	Russian Premier League	21	0	4	0	—		—		25	0
Sochi	2024–25	Russian First League	28	0	4	0	—		2 (Note: Appearances in promotion play-offs)	0	34	0
Sochi	2025–26	Russian Premier League	15	0	6	0	—		—		21	0
Sochi	Total		64	0	14	0	0	0	2	0	80	0
Career total			149	3	23	2	0	0	2	0	174	5
