= David Kokoyev =

Russian footballer

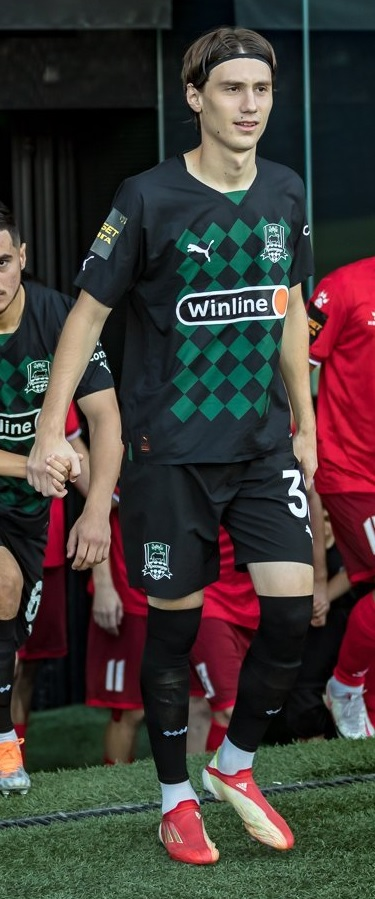
- Kokoyev with Krasnodar-2 in 2022

Personal information
- Full name: David Soslanovich Kokoyev
- Date of birth: 29 August 2002 (age 24)
- Place of birth: Vladikavkaz, Russia
- Height: 1.80 m (5 ft 11 in)
- Position: Midfielder

Team information
- Current team: Yenisey Krasnoyarsk
- Number: 17

Youth career
- 2018–2021: Krasnodar

Senior career*
Years	Team	Apps	(Gls)
2019–2021	Krasnodar-3	2	(0)
2021–2023	Krasnodar-2	45	(5)
2022–2025	Krasnodar	2	(0)
2023–2024	→ Neftekhimik Nizhnekamsk (loan)	32	(1)
2024–2025	→ Alania Vladikavkaz (loan)	12	(0)
2025–2026	Neftekhimik Nizhnekamsk	33	(5)
2026–	Yenisey Krasnoyarsk	0	(0)

International career^{‡}
2017	Russia U-16	6	(0)
2018	Russia U-17	3	(0)
2019	Russia U-18	3	(0)
- * Club domestic league appearances and goals as of 16 May 2026 ‡ National team caps and goals as of 18 November 2019

David Soslanovich Kokoyev (Russian: Давид Сосланович Кокоев; born 29 August 2002) is a Russian football player who plays for Yenisey Krasnoyarsk.

== Club career ==
He made his debut in the Russian Football National League for Krasnodar-2 on 10 July 2021 in a game against Spartak-2 Moscow.

He made his Russian Premier League debut for Krasnodar on 4 May 2022 against Lokomotiv Moscow.

On 2 July 2024, Kokoyev moved on loan to Alania Vladikavkaz, with an option to buy.

== Career statistics ==
As of 27 November 2022

Club	Season	League			Cup		Continental		Total	
Club	Season	Division	Apps	Goals	Apps	Goals	Apps	Goals	Apps	Goals
Krasnodar-3	2018–19	PFL	1	0	–		–		1	0
Krasnodar-3	2020–21	PFL	1	0	–		–		1	0
Krasnodar-3	Total		2	0	0	0	0	0	2	0
Krasnodar-2	2021–22	First League	17	1	–		–		17	1
Krasnodar-2	2022–23	First League	20	1	–		–		20	1
Krasnodar-2	Total		37	2	0	0	0	0	37	2
Krasnodar	2021–22	RPL	1	0	0	0	–		1	0
Krasnodar	2022–23	RPL	1	0	0	0	–		1	0
Krasnodar	Total		2	0	0	0	0	0	2	0
Career total			41	2	0	0	0	0	41	2
