= Daniil Kornyushin =

Russian footballer (born 2001)

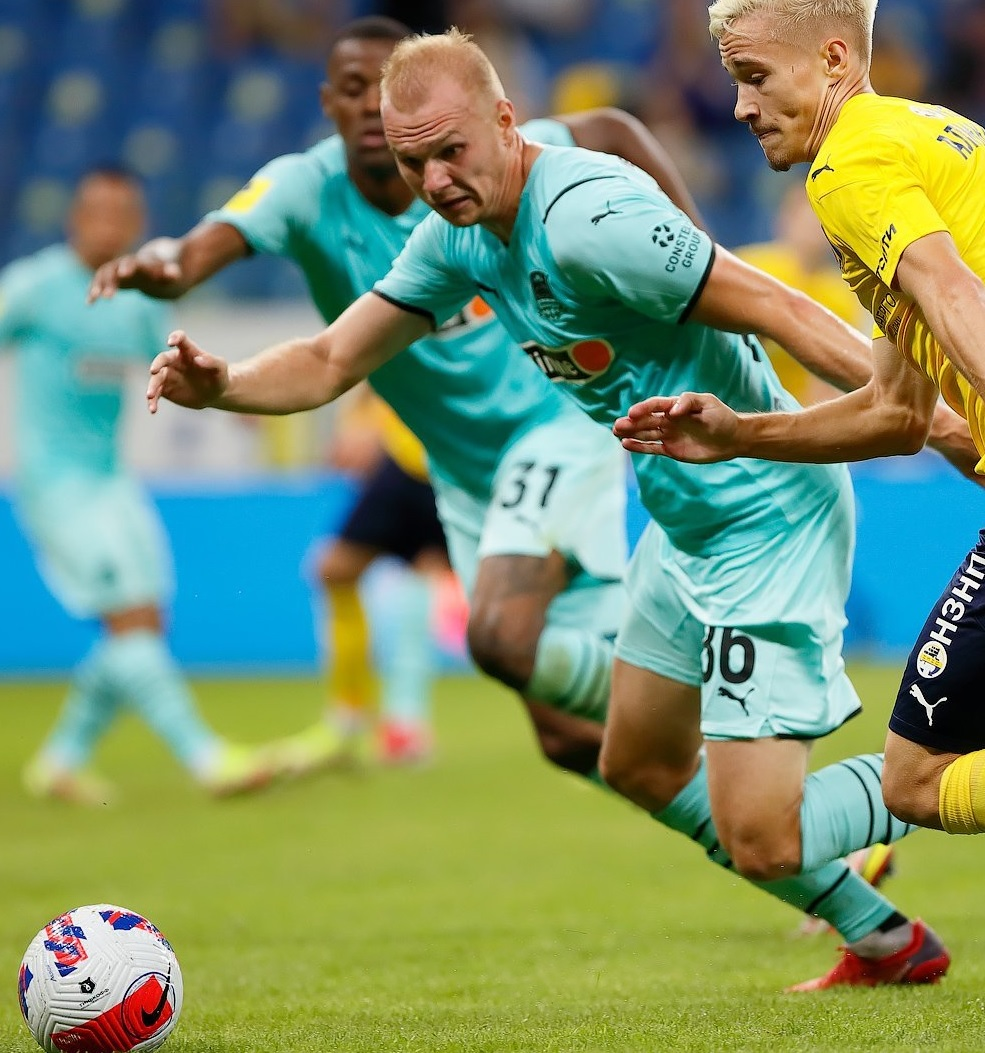
- Kornyushin with Krasnodar in 2021

Personal information
- Full name: Daniil Aleksandrovich Kornyushin
- Date of birth: 8 October 2001 (age 25)
- Place of birth: Stavropol, Russia
- Height: 1.87 m (6 ft 2 in)
- Position: Defender

Team information
- Current team: Torpedo Moscow
- Number: 44

Youth career
- 2018–2019: Krasnodar

Senior career*
Years	Team	Apps	(Gls)
2018–2021	Krasnodar-3	18	(2)
2020	→ Volgar Astrakhan (loan)	10	(0)
2021–2022	Krasnodar-2	29	(2)
2021–2022	Krasnodar	3	(0)
2022–2023	Pari Nizhny Novgorod	14	(0)
2023–2024	SKA-Khabarovsk	22	(1)
2024–2025	Ufa	21	(1)
2025–2026	Shinnik Yaroslavl	32	(6)
2026–	Torpedo Moscow	0	(0)
- * Club domestic league appearances and goals as of 16 May 2026

Daniil Aleksandrovich Kornyushin (Russian: Дании́л Алекса́ндрович Корню́шин; born 8 October 2001) is a Russian football player who plays as a right back or left back for Torpedo Moscow.

== Club career ==
He made his debut in the Russian Football National League for Volgar Astrakhan on 8 August 2020 in a game against Baltika Kaliningrad, he substituted Andrei Zenin in the 70th minute.

He made his debut in the Russian Premier League for Krasnodar on 15 August 2021 in a game against Arsenal Tula, he started and played a complete game.

On 30 June 2022, Kornyushin signed a three-year contract with Pari Nizhny Novgorod. The contract was terminated by mutual consent on 14 September 2023.

== Career statistics ==
As of 27 November 2022

Club	Season	League			Cup		Continental		Total	
Club	Season	Division	Apps	Goals	Apps	Goals	Apps	Goals	Apps	Goals
Krasnodar-3	2018–19	PFL	8	1	–		–		8	1
Krasnodar-3	2019–20	PFL	9	1	–		–		9	1
Krasnodar-3	2020–21	PFL	1	0	–		–		1	0
Krasnodar-3	Total		18	2	0	0	0	0	18	2
Krasnodar-2	2020–21	FNL	15	0	–		–		15	0
Krasnodar-2	2021–22	FNL	14	2	–		–		14	2
Krasnodar-2	Total		29	2	0	0	0	0	29	2
Volgar Astrakhan	2020–21	FNL	10	0	1	0	–		11	0
Krasnodar	2021–22	RPL	3	0	2	0	–		5	0
Pari NN	2022–23	RPL	10	0	4	0	–		14	0
Career total			70	4	7	0	0	0	77	4
