= Vyacheslav Yakimov =

Russian footballer

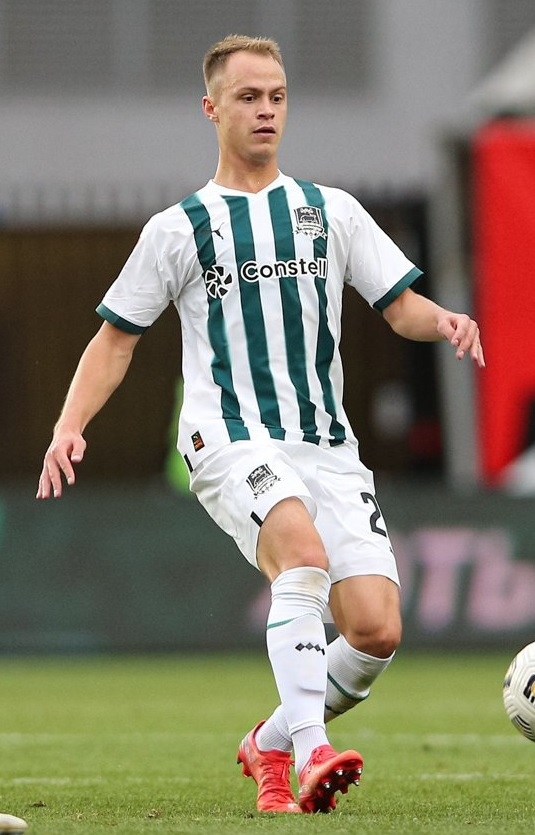
- Yakimov with Krasnodar in 2022

Personal information
- Full name: Vyacheslav Andreyevich Yakimov
- Date of birth: 5 January 1998 (age 28)
- Place of birth: Novokubansk, Russia
- Height: 1.78 m (5 ft 10 in)
- Position: Defensive midfielder

Team information
- Current team: FC Fakel Voronezh
- Number: 23

Youth career
- 2015: Krasnodar
- 2019: Krasnodar

Senior career*
Years	Team	Apps	(Gls)
2016–2017	FC KubGU Krasnodar		
2018	FC Urozhay Ivanovskaya		
2019–2022	Krasnodar-2	89	(1)
2019–2020	Krasnodar-3	6	(0)
2021–2023	Krasnodar	15	(0)
2022–2023	→ Fakel Voronezh (loan)	12	(0)
2023–	Fakel Voronezh	85	(6)
- * Club domestic league appearances and goals as of 21 November 2026

Vyacheslav Andreyevich Yakimov (Russian: Вячеслав Андреевич Якимов; born 5 January 1998) is a Russian professional footballer who plays as a defensive midfielder for FC Fakel Voronezh.

== Club career ==
He made his debut in the Russian Football National League for FC Krasnodar-2 on 10 March 2019 in a game against FC Tom Tomsk.

He made his Russian Premier League debut for FC Krasnodar on 12 December 2021 against FC Nizhny Novgorod.

On 5 December 2022, Yakimov joined FC Fakel Voronezh on loan until the end of the 2022–23 season, with an option to buy. On 15 June 2023, Fakel made the transfer permanent.

== Career statistics ==
As of match played 21 November 2026

Appearances and goals by club, season and competition
Club	Season	League			Cup		Other		Total	
Club	Season	Division	Apps	Goals	Apps	Goals	Apps	Goals	Apps	Goals
Krasnodar-2	2018–19	Russian First League	11	0	—		5 (Note: Appearances in FNL Cup)	0	16	0
Krasnodar-2	2019–20	Russian First League	18	1	—		—		18	1
Krasnodar-2	2020–21	Russian First League	30	0	—		—		30	0
Krasnodar-2	2021–22	Russian First League	22	0	—		—		22	0
Krasnodar-2	2022–23	Russian First League	8	0	—		—		8	0
Krasnodar-2	Total		89	1	0	0	5	0	94	1
Krasnodar-3	2018–19	Russian Second League	4	0	—		—		4	0
Krasnodar-3	2019–20	Russian Second League	2	0	—		—		2	0
Krasnodar-3	Total		6	0	0	0	—		6	0
Krasnodar	2021–22	Russian Premier League	10	0	0	0	—		10	0
Krasnodar	2022–23	Russian Premier League	5	0	2	0	—		7	0
Krasnodar	Total		15	0	2	0	0	0	17	0
Fakel Voronezh (loan)	2022–23	Russian Premier League	12	0	2	0	2 (Note: Appearance(s) in relegation playoffs)	0	16	0
Fakel Voronezh	2023–24	Russian Premier League	24	4	5	0	—		29	4
Fakel Voronezh	2024–25	Russian Premier League	23	0	2	0	—		25	0
Fakel Voronezh	2025–26	Russian First League	23	0	2	0	—		25	0
Fakel Voronezh	2026–27	Russian Premier League	15	2	2	0	—		17	2
Fakel Voronezh	Total		97	6	13	0	2	0	112	6
Career total			207	7	15	0	7	0	229	7
