= Vladislav Samko =

Russian footballer

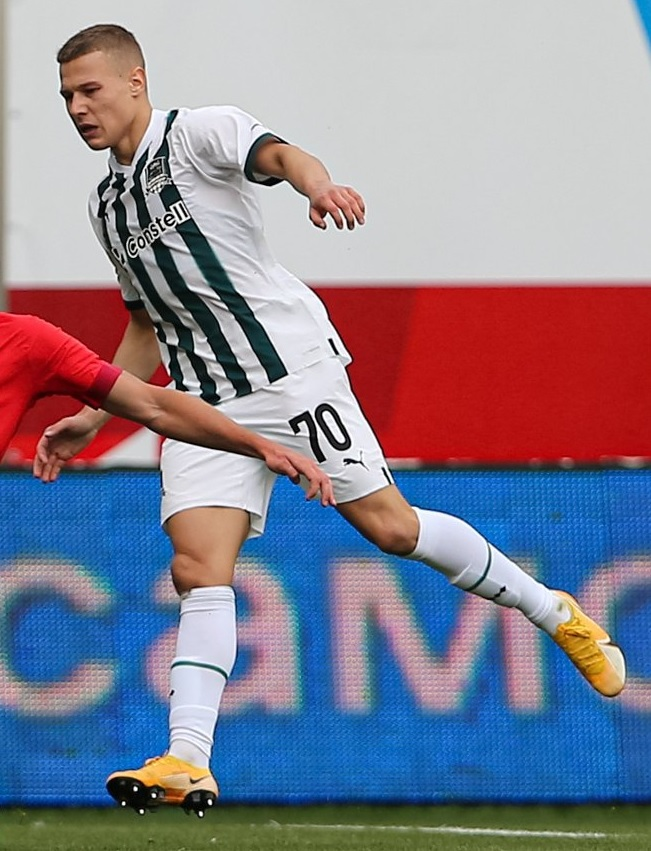
- Samko with Krasnodar in 2022

Personal information
- Full name: Vladislav Igorevich Samko
- Date of birth: 3 January 2002 (age 24)
- Height: 1.76 m (5 ft 9 in)
- Position: Forward

Team information
- Current team: Rodina-2 Moscow
- Number: 70

Youth career
- 2019–2021: Krasnodar

Senior career*
Years	Team	Apps	(Gls)
2019	Krasnodar-3	15	(1)
2021–2023	Krasnodar-2	54	(3)
2022–2023	Krasnodar	9	(0)
2023–2025	Rodina Moscow	18	(2)
2023–	Rodina-2 Moscow	50	(6)
2024	→ Sokol Saratov (loan)	13	(1)
2024–2025	→ Sokol Saratov (loan)	10	(1)
2025	→ Saturn Ramenskoye (loan)	12	(2)
- * Club domestic league appearances and goals as of 15 November 2026

Vladislav Igorevich Samko (Russian: Владислав Игоревич Самко; born 3 January 2002) is a Russian football player who plays for Rodina-2 Moscow.

== Club career ==
He made his debut in the Russian Football National League for Krasnodar-2 on 17 July 2021 in a game against Alania Vladikavkaz.

He made his Russian Premier League debut for Krasnodar on 17 April 2022 against Krylia Sovetov Samara.

== Career statistics ==
As of 27 November 2022

Club	Season	League			Cup		Continental		Total	
Club	Season	Division	Apps	Goals	Apps	Goals	Apps	Goals	Apps	Goals
Krasnodar-3	2019–20	PFL	15	1	–		–		15	1
Krasnodar-2	2021–22	First League	26	0	–		–		26	0
Krasnodar-2	2022–23	First League	15	2	–		–		15	2
Krasnodar-2	Total		41	2	0	0	0	0	41	2
Krasnodar	2021–22	RPL	6	0	–		–		6	0
Krasnodar	2022–23	RPL	3	0	1	0	–		4	0
Krasnodar	Total		9	0	1	0	0	0	10	0
Career total			65	3	1	0	0	0	66	3
