= Grigory Zhilkin =

Russian footballer

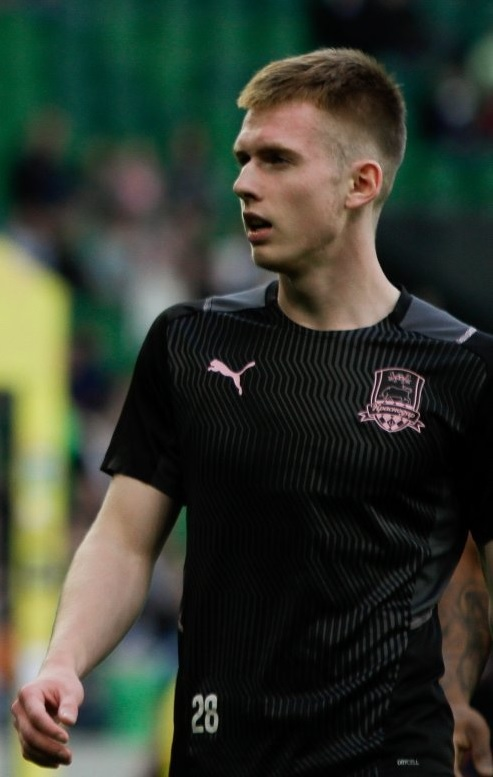
- Zhilkin with Krasnodar in 2022

Personal information
- Full name: Grigory Mikhaylovich Zhilkin
- Date of birth: 20 June 2003 (age 23)
- Place of birth: Biofabrika, Russia
- Height: 1.75 m (5 ft 9 in)
- Position: Left-back

Team information
- Current team: Amkar Perm
- Number: 28

Youth career
- Krasnodar

Senior career*
Years	Team	Apps	(Gls)
2022–2024	Krasnodar-2	66	(4)
2022–2025	Krasnodar	1	(0)
2024–2025	→ Arsenal Tula (loan)	18	(0)
2025	→ Chernomorets Novorossiysk (loan)	4	(0)
2025–2026	Chernomorets Novorossiysk	21	(0)
2026–	Amkar Perm	7	(1)

International career^{‡}
2019	Russia U17	2	(0)
- * Club domestic league appearances and goals as of 17 October 2026 ‡ National team caps and goals as of 12 December 2019

Grigory Mikhaylovich Zhilkin (Russian: Григорий Михайлович Жилкин; born 20 June 2003) is a Russian football player who plays for Amkar Perm.

== Club career ==
Zhilkin made his Russian Football National League debut for Krasnodar-2 on 12 March 2022 against Fakel Voronezh.

He made his debut in the Russian Premier League for Krasnodar on 21 May 2022 in a game against Akhmat Grozny.

On 8 July 2024, Zhilkin joined Arsenal Tula on a season-long loan. On 20 February 2025, Zhilkin moved on a new loan to Chernomorets Novorossiysk.

On 1 July 2025, Zhilkin moved to Chernomorets on a permanent basis and signed a two-year contract.

== Career statistics ==
As of 24 May 2025

Club	Season	League			Cup		Continental		Total	
Club	Season	Division	Apps	Goals	Apps	Goals	Apps	Goals	Apps	Goals
Krasnodar-2	2021–22	Russian First League	10	0	–		–		10	0
Krasnodar-2	2022–23	Russian First League	24	0	–		–		24	0
Krasnodar-2	2023–24	Russian Second League A	32	4	–		–		32	4
Krasnodar-2	Total		66	4	0	0	0	0	66	4
Krasnodar	2021–22	Russian Premier League	1	0	0	0	–		1	0
Krasnodar	2022–23	Russian Premier League	0	0	0	0	–		0	0
Krasnodar	Total		1	0	0	0	0	0	1	0
Arsenal Tula (loan)	2024–25	Russian First League	18	0	1	0	–		19	0
Chernomorets Novorossiysk (loan)	2024–25	Russian First League	4	0	0	0	–		4	0
Career total			89	4	1	0	0	0	90	4
