= Omar Popov =

Russian footballer

Personal information
- Full name: Omar Surkhay ogly Popov
- Date of birth: 2 January 2003 (age 23)
- Place of birth: Labinsk, Russia
- Height: 1.80 m (5 ft 11 in)
- Position: Forward

Team information
- Current team: FC Dynamo Saint Petersburg
- Number: 18

Youth career
- FC Krasnodar

Senior career*
Years	Team	Apps	(Gls)
2019–2020	FC Krasnodar-3	1	(0)
2021–2023	FC Krasnodar-2	17	(1)
2022–2023	FC Krasnodar	2	(0)
2023–2025	FC Rodina-2 Moscow	35	(3)
2025	→ FC Irtysh Omsk (loan)	8	(0)
2025	FC Kuban-Holding Pavlovskaya	16	(4)
2026–	FC Dynamo Saint Petersburg	25	(3)

International career^{‡}
2019	Russia U17	2	(0)
- * Club domestic league appearances and goals as of 1 November 2026 ‡ National team caps and goals as of 12 December 2019

Omar Surkhay ogly Popov (Russian: Омар Сурхай оглы Попов; born 2 January 2003) is a Russian football player who plays for FC Dynamo Saint Petersburg.

== Club career ==
He made his debut in the Russian Football National League for FC Krasnodar-2 on 9 October 2021 in a game against FC Dynamo Saint Petersburg.

He made his Russian Premier League debut for FC Krasnodar on 7 March 2022 against FC Ural Yekaterinburg.

== Career statistics ==
As of 21 May 2022

Club	Season	League			Cup		Continental		Total	
Club	Season	Division	Apps	Goals	Apps	Goals	Apps	Goals	Apps	Goals
Krasnodar-3	2019–20	PFL	1	0	–		–		1	0
Krasnodar-2	2021–22	FNL	3	0	–		–		3	0
Krasnodar	2021–22	RPL	2	0	0	0	–		2	0
Career total			6	0	0	0	0	0	6	0
