= 2021–22 FC Krasnodar season =

FC Krasnodar
2021–22 season
- Chairman: Sergey Galitsky
- Manager: Viktor Goncharenko (until 5 January); Daniel Farke (13 January - 2 March); Aleksey Antonyuk (2 March - 5 April); Aleksandr Storozhuk (from 5 April)
- Stadium: Krasnodar Stadium
- Premier League: 4th
- Russian Cup: Round of 32
- Top goalscorer: League: Eduard Spertsyan (8); All: Eduard Spertsyan (8)
- Highest home attendance: 24,485 vs CSKA Moscow (15 May 2022)
- Lowest home attendance: 491 vs Rubin Kazan (27 August 2021)
- Average home league attendance: 11,448 (21 May 2022)
Home colours	Away colours	Third colours

The 2021–22 FC Krasnodar season was the eleventh successive season that Krasnodar play in the Russian Premier League, the highest tier of association football in Russia. They finished the previous season in 10th place, missing out on European football for the first time since 2013–14 season. Aside from the Russian Premier League, Krasnodar also took part in the Russian Cup.

== Season events ==
On 11 June, Krasnodar announced the signing of Vladimir Ilyin to a three-year contract from Akhmat Grozny.

On 4 July, German Onugkha made a permanent move to Vejle, where he'd been on loan to the previous season.

On 21 July, Kristoffer Olsson left Krasnodar to join Anderlecht.

On 23 July, Krasnodar announced the signing of Jhon Córdoba to a four-year contract from Hertha BSC.

On 2 August, Krasnodar announced the signing of Grzegorz Krychowiak to a three-year contract from Lokomotiv Moscow.

On 20 August, Ilya Zhigulyov left Krasnodar to sign for Ekstraklasa club Zagłębie Lubin.

On 8 September, Magomed-Shapi Suleymanov joined Giresunspor on loan for the remainder of the 2021–22 season.

On 22 December, Krasnodar announced the signing of Erik Botheim to a 3.5-year contract from Bodø/Glimt.

On 5 January, Krasnodar announced that Viktor Goncharenko had been sacked as Head Coach of the club.

On 7 January, Krasnodar announced that they had agreed a deal to sign Júnior Alonso from Atlético Mineiro on a contract until June 2025.

On 13 January, Krasnodar announced Daniel Farke as Viktor Goncharenko's replacement as Head Coach.

On 17 January, Tonny Vilhena joined Espanyol on loan until 30 June 2022.

On 24 February, Krasnodar's home match against Lokomotiv Moscow was postponed due to the local airport being shut by the Federal Air Transport Agency in relation to the Russian invasion of Ukraine.

On 2 March, Daniel Farke and his coaching staff left the club by mutual consent, with Aleksey Antonyuk being placed in temporary charge. The following day, Wanderson, Kaio, Erik Botheim, Cristian Ramírez, Júnior Alonso, Jhon Córdoba, Viktor Claesson and Rémy Cabella all suspended their contracts with Krasnodar and left the club's training base to train on their own. On 5 March, Viktor Claesson terminated his contract with Krasnodar by mutual consent. On 9 March, Rémy Cabella terminated his contract with Krasnodar by mutual consent. On 11 March, Wanderson joined Internacional on loan until 31 December 2022.

On 14 March, Júnior Alonso was loaned back to Atlético Mineiro until 31 December 2022. The following day, 15 March, Krasnodar announced that Grzegorz Krychowiak's contract had been suspended until 1 June 2022, with Krychowiak then signing for AEK Athens the same day until the end of the 2021–22 season.

On 16 March, Krasnodar's postponed round 19 match against Lokomotiv Moscow was rescheduled for 4 May.

On 18 May, Erik Botheim's agent announced that Botheim had terminated his contract with Krasnodar.

On 22 May, Krasnodar announced that Yevgeni Gorodov, Alyaksandr Martynovich and Yury Gazinsky had all left the club following the expiration of their contract.

== Squad ==
As of match played 21 May 2022

Number	Name	Nationality	Position	Date of birth (age)	Signed from	Signed in	Contract ends	Apps.	Goals
Goalkeepers
1	Yevgeni Gorodov	(Russia)	GK	13 December 1985 (aged 36)	Akhmat Grozny	2020	2022	35	0
39	Matvei Safonov	(Russia)	GK	25 February 1999 (aged 23)	Academy	2016		110	0
58	Stanislav Agkatsev	(Russia)	GK	9 January 2002 (aged 20)	Academy	2018		8	0
Defenders
2	Yegor Sorokin	(Russia)	DF	4 November 1995 (aged 26)	Rubin Kazan	2019	2024	56	0
4	Alyaksandr Martynovich	(Belarus)	DF	26 August 1987 (aged 34)	Dinamo Minsk	2010	2022	269	5
18	Yevgeni Chernov	(Russia)	DF	23 October 1992 (aged 29)	Rostov	2020	2024	36	0
28	Grigory Zhilkin	(Russia)	DF	20 June 2003 (aged 18)	Academy	2021		1	0
32	Dmitri Pivovarov	(Russia)	DF	21 March 2000 (aged 22)	Academy	2021		2	0
41	Mikhail Sukhoruchenko	(Russia)	DF	13 April 2003 (aged 19)	Academy	2021		1	0
44	Sergei Borodin	(Russia)	DF	30 January 1999 (aged 23)	Academy	2015		4	0
48	Oleg Isayenko	(Russia)	DF	31 January 2000 (aged 22)	Academy	2018		8	0
50	Vitali Stezhko	(Russia)	DF	29 January 1997 (aged 25)	Academy	2018		2	0
84	Vyacheslav Litvinov	(Russia)	DF	1 April 2001 (aged 21)	Academy	2018		10	0
86	Daniil Kornyushin	(Russia)	DF	8 October 2001 (aged 20)	Academy	2018		5	0
98	Sergei Petrov	(Russia)	DF	2 January 1991 (aged 31)	Krylia Sovetov	2013		247	14
Midfielders
8	Yury Gazinsky	(Russia)	MF	20 July 1989 (aged 32)	Torpedo Moscow	2013	2022	282	14
11	Aleksei Ionov	(Russia)	MF	18 February 1989 (aged 33)	Rostov	2020	2023	47	6
15	Aleks Matsukatov	(Russia)	MF	1 November 1999 (aged 22)	Academy	2019		14	0
23	Vyacheslav Yakimov	(Russia)	MF	5 January 1998 (aged 24)	Academy	2021		10	0
38	David Kokoyev	(Russia)	MF	29 August 2002 (aged 19)	Academy	2021		1	0
53	Alexander Chernikov	(Russia)	MF	1 February 2000 (aged 22)	Academy	2019		33	3
56	Bogdan Reykhmen	(Russia)	MF	26 May 2002 (aged 19)	Academy	2021		4	0
74	Eduard Spertsyan	(Armenia)	MF	7 June 2000 (aged 21)	Academy	2018		34	8
88	Nikita Krivtsov	(Russia)	MF	18 August 2002 (aged 19)	Torpedo Vladimir	2021		22	2
94	Dmitry Kuchugura	(Russia)	MF	21 October 2004 (aged 17)	Academy	2021		1	0
Forwards
29	Vladimir Ilyin	(Russia)	FW	20 May 1992 (aged 30)	Akhmat Grozny	2021	2024	24	4
37	Ilya Vorotnikov	(Russia)	FW	11 February 2001 (aged 21)	Academy	2017		1	0
40	Olakunle Olusegun	(Nigeria)	FW	23 April 2002 (aged 20)	on loan from Botev Plovdiv	2021	2022	9	0
63	Nikita Sergeyev	(Russia)	FW	17 October 1999 (aged 22)	Academy	2016		5	0
67	Maksim Kutovoy	(Russia)	FW	1 July 2001 (aged 20)	Academy	2019		10	0
69	Irakli Manelov	(Russia)	FW	19 September 2002 (aged 19)	Academy	2021		14	1
70	Vladislav Samko	(Russia)	FW	3 January 2002 (aged 20)	Academy	2021		6	0
79	Omar Popov	(Russia)	FW	2 January 2003 (aged 19)	Academy	2021		2	0
81	Leon Sabua	(Russia)	FW	1 September 2000 (aged 21)	Academy	2016		5	1
82	Sergei Volkov	(Russia)	FW	9 September 2002 (aged 19)	Academy	2018		4	1
85	Jonathan Okoronkwo	(Nigeria)	FW	13 September 2003 (aged 18)	on loan from Botev Plovdiv	2022	2022	2	0
92	Ruslan Apekov	(Russia)	FW	8 June 2000 (aged 21)	Academy	2021		5	0
Contracts suspended
3	Grzegorz Krychowiak	(Poland)	MF	29 January 1990 (aged 32)	Lokomotiv Moscow	2021	2024	15	5
6	Cristian Ramírez	(Ecuador)	DF	12 August 1994 (aged 27)	Ferencvárosi	2017		148	1
9	Jhon Córdoba	(Colombia)	FW	11 May 1993 (aged 29)	Hertha BSC	2021	2025	16	6
31	Kaio	(Brazil)	MF	18 September 1995 (aged 26)	Santa Clara	2019	2024	62	1
Away on loan
10	Wanderson	(Brazil)	MF	7 October 1994 (aged 27)	Red Bull Salzburg	2017		130	16
12	Júnior Alonso	(Paraguay)	DF	9 February 1993 (aged 29)	Atlético Mineiro	2022	2025	0	0
52	Tonny Vilhena	(Netherlands)	MF	3 January 1995 (aged 27)	Feyenoord	2019		79	9
	Sergei Yeshchenko	(Russia)	GK	1 March 2001 (aged 21)	Academy	2018		0	0
	Leo Goglichidze	(Russia)	DF	29 April 1997 (aged 25)	Chayka Peschanokopskoye	2021		0	0
	Ilya Martynov	(Russia)	DF	25 January 2000 (aged 22)	Academy	2016		0	0
	Younes Namli	(Denmark)	MF	20 June 1994 (aged 27)	PEC Zwolle	2019	2023	18	1
	Daniil Utkin	(Russia)	MF	12 October 1999 (aged 22)	Academy	2018		64	7
	Igor Andreyev	(Russia)	FW	15 August 2001 (aged 20)	Nosta Novotroitsk	2021	2025	0	0
	Magomed-Shapi Suleymanov	(Russia)	FW	16 December 1999 (aged 22)	Academy	2015		118	23
Players who left during the season
5	Uroš Spajić	(Serbia)	DF	13 February 1993 (aged 29)	Anderlecht	2018	2023	76	2
7	Rémy Cabella	(France)	MF	8 March 1990 (aged 32)	AS Saint-Étienne	2019		62	17
16	Viktor Claesson	(Sweden)	MF	2 January 1992 (aged 30)	IF Elfsborg	2017		147	43
20	Ilya Zhigulyov	(Russia)	MF	1 February 1996 (aged 26)	Academy	2012		23	0
20	Erik Botheim	(Norway)	FW	10 January 2000 (aged 22)	Bodø/Glimt	2021	2025	0	0
65	Yevgeni Nazarov	(Russia)	DF	7 April 1997 (aged 25)	Academy	2015		0	0
89	Dmitry Stotsky	(Russia)	MF	1 December 1989 (aged 32)	Ufa	2018	2022	68	2
	Maksim Khramtsov	(Russia)	DF	4 February 2002 (aged 20)	Academy	2019		0	0
	Igor Paradin	(Russia)	DF	10 September 1998 (aged 23)	Academy	2015		0	0

=== Contract suspensions ===
Note: Flags indicate national team as defined under FIFA eligibility rules; some limited exceptions apply. Players may hold more than one non-FIFA nationality.

No.	Pos.	Nation	Player
—	MF	POL	Grzegorz Krychowiak (at AEK Athens)

=== Out on loan ===
Note: Flags indicate national team as defined under FIFA eligibility rules; some limited exceptions apply. Players may hold more than one non-FIFA nationality.

No.	Pos.	Nation	Player
—	GK	RUS	Sergei Yeshchenko (at Fakel Voronezh for 2021–22 season)
—	DF	RUS	Leo Goglichidze (at Ural Yekaterinburg for 2021–22 season)
—	DF	RUS	Ilya Martynov (at Rotor Volgograd for 2021–22 season)
—	DF	PAR	Júnior Alonso (at Atlético Mineiro until 31 December 2022)
—	MF	BRA	Wanderson (at Internacional until 31 December 2022)

No.	Pos.	Nation	Player
—	MF	DEN	Younes Namli (at Sparta Rotterdam until 30 June 2022)
—	MF	NED	Tonny Vilhena (at Espanyol until 30 June 2022)
—	MF	RUS	Daniil Utkin (at Akhmat Grozny until 31 May 2022)
—	FW	RUS	Igor Andreyev (at Rodina Moscow until 31 May 2022)
—	FW	RUS	Magomed-Shapi Suleymanov (at Giresunspor until 30 June 2022)

== Transfers ==
=== In ===
Date	Position	Nationality	Name	From	Fee	Ref.
11 June 2021	FW	(Russia)	Vladimir Ilyin	Akhmat Grozny	Undisclosed	
23 July 2021	FW	(Colombia)	Jhon Córdoba	Hertha BSC	Undisclosed	
2 August 2021	MF	(Poland)	Grzegorz Krychowiak	Lokomotiv Moscow	Undisclosed	
22 December 2021	FW	(Norway)	Erik Botheim	Bodø/Glimt	Undisclosed	
7 January 2022	DF	(Paraguay)	Júnior Alonso	Atlético Mineiro	Undisclosed	

=== Loans in ===
Date from	Position	Nationality	Name	From	Date to	Ref.
23 August 2021	FW	(Nigeria)	Olakunle Olusegun	Botev Plovdiv	End of season	
22 February 2021	FW	(Nigeria)	Jonathan Okoronkwo	Botev Plovdiv	End of season	

=== Out ===
Date	Position	Nationality	Name	To	Fee	Ref.
4 July 2021	FW	(Russia)	German Onugkha	Vejle	Undisclosed	
21 July 2021	MF	(Sweden)	Kristoffer Olsson	Anderlecht	Undisclosed	
20 August 2021	MF	(Russia)	Ilya Zhigulyov	Zagłębie Lubin	Undisclosed	
25 January 2022	DF	(Russia)	Yevgeni Nazarov	Bohemians 1905	Undisclosed	
31 January 2022	DF	(Russia)	Igor Paradin	Kuban-Holding Pavlovskaya	Undisclosed	
11 February 2022	DF	(Russia)	Maksim Khramtsov	Baltika Kaliningrad	Undisclosed	
28 May 2022	DF	(Russia)	Leo Goglichidze	Ural Yekaterinburg	Undisclosed	

=== Loans out ===
Date from	Position	Nationality	Name	To	Date to	Ref.
15 January 2020	MF	(Denmark)	Younes Namli	Colorado Rapids	December 2021	
10 June 2021	DF	(Russia)	Ilya Martynov	Rotor Volgograd	End of season	
11 June 2021	MF	(Russia)	Daniil Utkin	Akhmat Grozny	End of season	
19 June 2021	DF	(Russia)	Leo Goglichidze	Nizhny Novgorod	2 September 2021	
15 July 2021	DF	(Russia)	Igor Paradin	Mashuk-KMV	31 December 2021	
16 July 2021	FW	(Russia)	Igor Andreyev	Rodina Moscow	End of season	
2 September 2021	DF	(Russia)	Leo Goglichidze	Ural Yekaterinburg	End of season	
8 September 2021	FW	(Russia)	Magomed-Shapi Suleymanov	Giresunspor	End of season	
15 December 2021	GK	(Russia)	Sergei Yeshchenko	Fakel Voronezh	End of season	
11 January 2022	MF	(Denmark)	Younes Namli	Sparta Rotterdam	30 June 2022	
17 January 2022	MF	(Netherlands)	Tonny Vilhena	Espanyol	30 June 2022	
11 March 2022	MF	(Brazil)	Wanderson	Internacional	End of season	
14 March 2022	DF	(Paraguay)	Júnior Alonso	Atlético Mineiro	End of season	

=== Contract suspensions ===
Date	Position	Nationality	Name	Joined	Date	Ref.
15 March 2022	MF	(Poland)	Grzegorz Krychowiak	AEK Athens	1 June 2022	

=== Released ===
Date	Position	Nationality	Name	Joined	Date	Ref.
8 June 2021	MF	(Russia)	Igor Smolnikov	Arsenal Tula	23 July 2021	
21 January 2022	DF	(Serbia)	Uroš Spajić	Kasımpaşa	31 January 2022	
25 January 2022	MF	(Russia)	Dmitry Stotsky	Nizhny Novgorod	26 January 2022	
5 March 2022	MF	(Sweden)	Viktor Claesson	Copenhagen	30 March 2022	
9 March 2022	MF	(France)	Rémy Cabella	Montpellier	6 April 2022	
18 May 2022	FW	(Norway)	Erik Botheim	Salernitana	7 July 2022	
22 May 2022	GK	(Russia)	Yevgeni Gorodov	Retired		
22 May 2022	DF	(Belarus)	Alyaksandr Martynovich	Rubin Kazan	13 June 2022	
22 May 2022	MF	(Russia)	Yury Gazinsky	Ural Yekaterinburg	17 August 2022	
31 May 2022	DF	(Russia)	Artyom Datsenko	Tver		
31 May 2022	DF	(Russia)	Vitali Stezhko	Yenisey Krasnoyarsk		
31 May 2022	MF	(Russia)	Oleg Korotkov	SKA-Khabarovsk-2		
31 May 2022	FW	(Russia)	Ilya Vorotnikov	SKA Rostov-on-Don		
31 May 2022	FW	(Russia)	Nikita Sergeyev			

== Friendlies ==
19 January 2022	Krasnodar (Russia)	1 – 2	(Poland) Legia Warsaw	Dubai, United Arab Emirates
15:00 MSK (UTC+3)	Wanderson 12'; Krychowiak (yellow card) 24'; Borodin (yellow card) 70'	Report	Slisz (yellow card) 34'; Josué 54'; Wieteska 82'	Referee: M.Ivkovic

23 January 2022	Krasnodar (Russia)	3 – 2	(Slovakia) MŠK Žilina	Dubai, United Arab Emirates
15:00 MSK (UTC+3)	Krychowiak 19'; Spertsyan 25'; Chernikov 60'; Wanderson (yellow card) 65'	Report	Paur (yellow card) 29'; Minárik 37'; Galčík 77'

30 January 2022	Krasnodar (Russia)	1 – 0	(Norway) Vålerenga	Marbella, Spain
18:00 MSK (UTC+3)	Spertsyan 43'; Safonov (yellow card) 90+1'	Report		Stadium: Marbella Football Center; Referee: F.Caballero

6 February 2022	Krasnodar (Russia)	2 – 1	(Sweden) Häcken	Marbella, Spain
18:00 MSK (UTC+3)	Kaio (yellow card) 33'; Spertsyan 69' (pen.); Claesson 90'	Report	Bengtsson 35'; Karlsson (yellow card) 68' (yellow-red card) 89'; Hammar (yellow card) 76'	Stadium: Marbella Football Center; Referee: T.Hagen

12 February 2022	Krasnodar (Russia)	2 – 0	(Sweden) Malmö	Marbella, Spain
13:00 MSK (UTC+3)	Ramírez 35'; Wanderson 58'; Krychowiak (yellow card) 60'; Chernikov (yellow card) 65'	Report	Rakip 28'; Larsson (yellow card) 40'; Chaluš (yellow card) 75'	Stadium: Marbella Football Center; Referee: E.Escos

15 February 2022	Krasnodar (Russia)	2 – 3	(Norway) Sarpsborg 08	Marbella, Spain
18:00 MSK (UTC+3)	Ionov 15'; Ilyin 64'	Report	Lindseth 17', 33'; Maigaard 53'	Stadium: Marbella Football Center

20 February 2022	Krasnodar	2 – 2	Rostov	Marbella, Spain
17:45 MSK (UTC+3)	Botheim 15'; Claesson 25'	Report	Osipenko 30'; Poloz 58' (pen.); Melyokhin (yellow card) 67'; Komlichenko (yellow card) 71'	Stadium: Marbella Football Center; Referee: H.Rodriguez

== Competitions ==
=== Overview ===
Competition	First match	Last match	Starting round	Final position	Record							
Competition	First match	Last match	Starting round	Final position	Pld	W	D	L	GF	GA	GD	Win %
Premier League	25 July 2021	21 May 2022	Matchday 1	4th	29	14	7	8	41	29	+12	48.28
Russian Cup	22 September 2021	27 October 2021	Round of 32	Round of 32	2	1	1	0	2	3	−1	50.00
Total					31	15	8	8	43	32	+11	48.39

Last updated: 15 May 2022
Source: See Results

=== Premier League ===
==== League table ====
Pos	Team	Pld	W	D	L	GF	GA	GD	Pts
2	Sochi	30	17	5	8	54	30	+24	56
3	Dynamo Moscow	30	16	5	9	53	41	+12	53
4	Krasnodar	30	14	8	8	42	30	+12	50 (Note: Head-to-head points: Krasnodar 4, CSKA Moscow 1.)
5	CSKA Moscow	30	15	5	10	42	29	+13	50
6	Lokomotiv Moscow	30	13	9	8	43	39	+4	48

Source: Premier Liga
Rules for classification: 1) Points; 2) Head-to-head points; 3) Head-to-head matches won; 4) Head-to-head goal difference; 5) Head-to-head goals scored; 6) Matches won; 7) Goal difference; 8) Goals scored; 9) 2020–21 position (not applicable to final standings); 10) Play-off.

==== Results summary ====
Overall								Home						Away					
Pld	W	D	L	GF	GA	GD	Pts	W	D	L	GF	GA	GD	W	D	L	GF	GA	GD
30	14	8	8	42	30	+12	50	8	3	4	20	13	+7	6	5	4	22	17	+5

Last updated: 21 May 2022.
Source: See Results

==== Results by round ====
Round	1	2	3	4	5	6	7	8	9	10	11	12	13	14	15	16	17	18	19	20	21	22	23	24	25	26	27	28	29	30
Ground	H	A	A	H	A	H	A	A	Н	A	A	A	Н	A	Н	A	A	H	H	A	A	H	A	A	H	H	H	A	H	H
Result	W	L	L	W	L	W	D	W	W	D	D	W	L	L	W	D	W	D	W	W	D	L	W	L	L	W	W	D	W	D
Position	1	11	8	7	9	7	7	6	4	5	6	5	6	7	5	5	3	5	5	5	5	6	5	5	6	5	5	5	4	4

Updated to match(es) played on 21 May 2022. Source: See Results
A = Away; H = Home; W = Win; D = Draw; L = Loss

==== Results ====
25 July 2021 1	Ural Yekaterinburg	0 – 3	Krasnodar	Yekaterinburg
17:30 MSK (UTC+3)	Bicfalvi (penalty missed) 45+' (yellow card) 60'; Gerasimov (yellow card) 77'	Report	Spertsyan (yellow card) 53'; Vilhena 62', 85'; Chernikov (yellow card) 89'; Córdoba 90+' (pen.)	Stadium: Central Stadium; Attendance: 471; Referee: Vasily Kazartsev

1 August 2021 2	Krasnodar	0 – 1	Khimki	Krasnodar
20:00 MSK (UTC+3)	Claesson (penalty missed) 15'; Petrov (yellow card) 55'; Córdoba (yellow card) 82'; Chernikov (yellow card) 88'; Vilhena (yellow card) 90+2'; Cabella (yellow card) 90+'	Report	Stojinović (yellow card) 14'; Tikhy (yellow card) 60'; Kukharchuk 63' (yellow card) 80'; Kamyshev (yellow card) 90+'; Dagerstål (yellow card) 90+'	Stadium: Krasnodar Stadium; Attendance: 500; Referee: Artyom Lyubimov

7 August 2021 3	Zenit St.Petersburg	3 – 2	Krasnodar	Saint Petersburg
17:00 MSK (UTC+3)	Azmoun 9', 35'; Kuzyayev (yellow card) 13'; Wendel (yellow card) 27'; Yerokhin 44'	Report	Córdoba 24'; Spajić 77'; Ramírez (yellow card) 79'	Stadium: Krestovsky Stadium; Attendance: 983; Referee: Alexey Amelin

15 August 2021 4	Krasnodar	3 – 2	Arsenal Tula	Krasnodar
20:00 MSK (UTC+3)	Cabella 24'; Gazinsky 29'; Córdoba 37' (penalty missed) 84'; Chernikov (yellow card) 56'	Report	Lutsenko 10', 86'; Björnström (yellow card) 65'; Novoseltsev (yellow card) 88'	Stadium: Krasnodar Stadium; Attendance: 500; Referee: Pavel Shadykhanov

22 August 2021 5	Lokomotiv Moscow	2 – 1	Krasnodar	Moscow
16:00 MSK (UTC+3)	Smolov 7', 33'; Lisakovich (yellow card) 14'; Zhemaletdinov (yellow card) 39'; Barinov (yellow card) 77'; Kulikov (yellow card) 90+'	Report	Chernikov (yellow card) 61'; Córdoba 71'; Cabella (yellow card) 78'; Gazinsky (yellow card) 90+'	Stadium: RZD Arena; Attendance: 2,914; Referee: Vitali Meshkov

27 August 2021 6	Krasnodar	2 – 0	Rubin Kazan	Krasnodar
20:30 MSK (UTC+3)	Claesson (yellow card) 1'; Ionov 12'; Córdoba 35'; Gazinsky (yellow card) 60'	Report	Zotov (yellow card) 7'; Samoshnikov (yellow card) 8'	Stadium: Krasnodar Stadium; Attendance: 491; Referee: Evgeny Kukulyak

13 September 2021 7	Rostov	1 – 1	Krasnodar	Rostov-on-Don
19:30 MSK (UTC+3)	Sukhomlinov (yellow card) 6'; Spajić 29' (o.g.); Almqvist (yellow card) 41'; Komlichenko (yellow card) 44'; Langovich (yellow card) 70'	Report	Krychowiak (yellow card) 7' (yellow-red card) 30'; Cabella (penalty missed) 42'; Gazinsky (yellow card) 51'; Spertsyan 65'; Ilyin (yellow card) 90+'	Stadium: Rostov Arena; Attendance: 5,669; Referee: Aleksei Matyunin

18 September 2021 8	Akhmat Grozny	0 – 2	Krasnodar	Grozny
19:00 MSK (UTC+3)	Nižić (yellow card) 55' (yellow-red card) 65'	Report	Spertsyan (yellow card) 23'; Cabella 41'; Ilyin 44'; Ramírez (yellow card) 68'; Kornyushin (yellow card) 80'	Stadium: Akhmat-Arena; Attendance: 7,399; Referee: Ivan Sidenkov

26 September 2021 9	Krasnodar	3 – 0	Sochi	Krasnodar
19:00 MSK (UTC+3)	Spertsyan 3'; Cabella 21'; Claesson (yellow card) 34'; Spajić (red card) 40'; Chernikov (yellow card) 54' (yellow-red card) 75'; Krychowiak 64' (pen.)	Report	Rodrigão (yellow card) 44'; Burmistrov (yellow card) 45'; Prokhin (yellow card) 84'; Yurganov (yellow card) 88'	Stadium: Krasnodar Stadium; Attendance: 10,554; Referee: Igor Panin

2 October 2021 10	CSKA Moscow	0 – 0	Krasnodar	Moscow
19:00 MSK (UTC+3)	Oblyakov (yellow card) 26'; Yakovlev (yellow card) 76'	Report	Ramírez (yellow card) 60'; Vilhena (yellow card) 82'	Stadium: VEB Arena; Attendance: 7,448; Referee: Vladimir Moskalyov

17 October 2021 11	Krasnodar	1 – 1	Ufa	Krasnodar
19:00 MSK (UTC+3)	Spajić (yellow card) 58'; Sorokin (yellow card) 62'; Krychowiak 84' (pen.)	Report	Agalarov 9'; Kamilov (yellow card) 75'; Zhuravlyov (yellow card) 84'; Mrzljak (yellow card) 90+'	Stadium: Krasnodar Stadium; Attendance: 10,554; Referee: Alexey Sukhoi

23 October 2021 12	Nizhny Novgorod	1 – 4	Krasnodar	Nizhny Novgorod
14:00 MSK (UTC+3)	Penchikov (yellow card) 64'; Kosarev (yellow card) 80'; Gotsuk 83' (yellow card) 90'; Suleymanov (yellow card) 83'	Report	Krychowiak 5'; Córdoba (yellow card) 20' (penalty missed) 70'; Spertsyan 56'; Chernikov 73' (yellow card) 89'; Ilyin 76'; Safonov (yellow card) 83'	Stadium: Nizhny Novgorod Stadium; Attendance: 2,857; Referee: Aleksei Matyunin

30 October 2021 13	Krasnodar	0 – 1	Krylia Sovetov	Krasnodar
19:00 MSK (UTC+3)	Cabella (yellow card) 45+'; Ilyin (yellow card) 77'	Report	Ivanisenya (yellow card) 30' (yellow-red card) 88'; Sarveli 43'; Sergeyev (yellow card) 45'; Vityugov (yellow card) 89'	Stadium: Krasnodar Stadium; Attendance: 10,554; Referee: Evgeny Kukulyak

6 November 2021 14	Dynamo Moscow	1 – 0	Krasnodar	Moscow
16:30 MSK (UTC+3)	Tyukavin (yellow card) 31'; Kutitsky (yellow card) 57'; Grulyov 73'	Report	Spertsyan (yellow card) 90+'	Stadium: VTB Arena; Attendance: 7,475; Referee: Vladimir Moskalyov

20 November 2021 15	Krasnodar	2 – 1	Spartak Moscow	Krasnodar
19:00 MSK (UTC+3)	Córdoba 16'; Chernikov (yellow card) 33'; Krychowiak 60' (pen.); Spertsyan (yellow card) 66'; Vilhena (yellow card) 74'	Report	Umyarov (yellow card) 10'; Sobolev 45+' (pen.); Caufriez (yellow card) 56'; Ayrton (yellow card) 59'	Stadium: Krasnodar Stadium; Attendance: 10,554; Referee: Alexey Sukhoi

27 November 2021 16	Khimki	3 – 3	Krasnodar	Khimki
19:00 MSK (UTC+3)	Nabiullin 54'; Glushakov 56'; Filin (yellow card) 59'; Dolgov 71'	Report	Claesson 16'; Krychowiak (penalty missed) 36'; Cabella 67'; Ilyin 80'; Chernikov (yellow card) 90+'	Stadium: Arena Khimki; Attendance: 704; Referee: Pavel Shadykhanov

5 December 2021 17	Sochi	1 – 2	Krasnodar	Sochi
19:00 MSK (UTC+3)	Cassierra 17'; Prokhin (yellow card) 34'	Report	Claesson 22' (pen.), 52'; Ramírez (yellow card) 26'; Chernikov (yellow card) 74'; Vilhena (yellow card) 79'; Krychowiak (red card) 87'	Stadium: Fisht Olympic Stadium; Attendance: 4,521; Referee: Sergei Karasev

12 December 2021 18	Krasnodar	0 – 0	Nizhny Novgorod	Krasnodar
19:00 MSK (UTC+3)	Sorokin (yellow card) 23'; Martynovich (yellow card) 40'; Claesson (yellow card) 76'; Apekov (yellow card) 90+'	Report	Miladinović (yellow card) 62'; Balaj (yellow card) 74'; Sapeta (yellow card) 90+'	Stadium: Krasnodar Stadium; Attendance: 10,554; Referee: Evgeny Kukulyak

7 March 2022 20	Krasnodar	2 – 1	Ural Yekaterinburg	Krasnodar
14:00 MSK (UTC+3)	Spertsyan 59' (pen.); Ilyin 65'; Sorokin (yellow card) 86'	Report	Gerasimov (yellow card) 75'; Bicfalvi 79'	Stadium: Krasnodar Stadium; Attendance: 6,230; Referee: Evgeny Turbin

13 March 2022 21	Spartak Moscow	1 – 2	Krasnodar	Moscow
19:00 MSK (UTC+3)	Promes 38' (pen.); Umyarov (yellow card) 43'; Nicholson (yellow card) 44'	Report	Spertsyan 5', 86' (pen.); Chernikov (yellow card) 31'	Stadium: Otkritie Arena; Attendance: 4,969; Referee: Evgeny Kukulyak

20 March 2022 22	Ufa	1 – 1	Krasnodar	Ufa
14:00 MSK (UTC+3)	Botaka (yellow card) 38'; Ortiz (yellow card) 58'; Fishchenko (yellow card) 73'; Agalarov 84' (pen.)	Report	Ionov 45+'; Chernikov (yellow card) 75'; Sorokin (yellow card) 90+'	Stadium: BetBoom Arena; Attendance: 4,570; Referee: Pavel Shadykhanov

3 April 2022 23	Krasnodar	0 – 1	Dynamo Moscow	Krasnodar
14:00 MSK (UTC+3)	Krivtsov (yellow card) 9'; Borodin (yellow card) 23'; Chernikov (yellow card) 35'; Martynovich (yellow card) 39'; Ionov (yellow card) 90+'	Report	Balbuena (yellow card) 21'; Fomin 45+' (pen.); Szymański (yellow card) 54'	Stadium: Krasnodar Stadium; Attendance: 12,213; Referee: Alexey Sukhoi

9 April 2022 24	Rubin Kazan	0 – 1	Krasnodar	Kazan
16:30 MSK (UTC+3)		Report	Chernikov (yellow card) 51' (yellow-red card) 90+'; Volkov 85'; Gazinsky (yellow card) 89'	Stadium: Ak Bars Arena; Attendance: 6,488; Referee: Vladimir Moskalyov

17 April 2022 25	Krylia Sovetov	2 – 0	Krasnodar	Samara
16:30 MSK (UTC+3)	Sarveli 24'; Glushenkov 53'; Yezhov (yellow card) 62'	Report	Yakimov (yellow card) 35'; Krivtsov (yellow card) 44'; Litvinov (yellow card) 54'; Borodin (yellow card) 77'	Stadium: Solidarnost Arena; Attendance: 21,520; Referee: Sergei Karasev

25 April 2022 26	Krasnodar	1 – 3	Zenit St.Petersburg	Krasnodar
19:00 MSK (UTC+3)	Manelov 73' (yellow card) 85'; Petrov (yellow card) 88'	Report	Sergeyev 35'; Malcom 42'; Mostovoy (yellow card) 85'; Ozdoyev 88'	Stadium: Krasnodar Stadium; Attendance: 17,590; Referee: Evgeny Kukulyak

30 April 2022 27	Krasnodar	2 – 1	Rostov	Krasnodar
16:30 MSK (UTC+3)	Krivtsov 14'; Kalinin 15' (o.g.); Yakimov (yellow card) 83'; Samko (yellow card) 88'	Report	Komlichenko 4'; Tugarev (yellow card) 45+'; Selyava (yellow card) 49'	Stadium: Krasnodar Stadium; Attendance: 17,590; Referee: Vladislav Bezborodov

4 May 2022 19	Krasnodar	1 – 0	Lokomotiv Moscow	Krasnodar
19:00 MSK (UTC+3)	Apekov (red card) 76'; Chernikov 83' (yellow card) 90' (yellow-red card) 90+5'	Report	Jedvaj (yellow card) 20'; Rybus (yellow card) 36'; Maradishvili (red card) 48'; Guilherme (yellow card) 70'	Stadium: Krasnodar Stadium; Attendance: 17,122; Referee: Artem Chistyakov
Note: Match originally scheduled for 27 February, but postponed on 24 February. Match rearranged for 4 May on 16 March.

8 May 2022 28	Arsenal Tula	1 – 1	Krasnodar	Tula
16:30 MSK (UTC+3)	K.Kangwa 19' (yellow card) 80'; Kaynov (yellow card) 22'; Smolnikov (yellow card) 63'; Kostadinov (yellow card) 77'	Report	Litvinov (yellow card) 31'; Spertsyan 76' (pen.); Matsukatov (yellow card) 83'; Sorokin (red card) 90'	Stadium: Arsenal Stadium; Attendance: 7,254; Referee: Sergey Ivanov

15 May 2022 29	Krasnodar	1 – 0	CSKA Moscow	Krasnodar
19:00 MSK (UTC+3)	Krivtsov (yellow card) 20' (goal) 75'; Pivovarov (yellow card) 90+'	Report	Shchennikov (yellow card) 33'; Ushakov (yellow card) 34'; Carrascal (yellow card) 45+'	Stadium: Krasnodar Stadium; Attendance: 24,485; Referee: Vladimir Moskalyov

21 May 2022 30	Krasnodar	1 – 1	Akhmat Grozny	Krasnodar
17:00 MSK (UTC+3)	Stezhko (yellow card) 21'; Spertsyan 90+'	Report	Utkin (yellow card) 39'; Umayev (yellow card) 44' (penalty missed) 45+'; Konaté 67'; Bogosavac (yellow card) 90+'; Todorović (yellow card) 90+'	Stadium: Krasnodar Arena; Attendance: 22,227; Referee: Pavel Shadykhanov

=== Russian Cup ===
==== Round of 32 ====
Pos	Team	Pld	W	D	L	GF	GA	GD	Pts	Qualification
1	Kuban Krasnodar (Q)	2	1	0	1	3	1	+2	3	Advance to Play-off
2	Krasnodar	2	1	0	1	2	3	−1	3	
3	Leningradets	2	1	0	1	1	2	−1	3	

Rules for classification: 1) Points; 2) Wins; 3) Goal differential; 4) Goals scored; 5) Head-to-head result; 6) Disciplinary points.
(Q) Qualified for the phase indicated

22 September 2021 2	Leningradets	0 – 2	Krasnodar	Saint Petersburg
16:00 MSK (UTC+3)	N.Polyakov (yellow card) 45+1'; A.Anisimov (yellow card) 52'; V.Shepelev (yellow card) 61'; M.Petrov (yellow card) 72'; Yakovlev (yellow card) 87'; Y.Kortsov (yellow card) 90'	Report	Ilyin (yellow card) 33'; Spertsyan (yellow card) 37'; Krivtsov (yellow card) 37'; Chernikov 42'; Krychowiak 85'	Stadium: Kirovets Stadium

27 October 2021 3	Kuban Krasnodar	3 – 0	Krasnodar	Krasnodar
19:30 MSK (UTC+3)	Lauk 6', 63'; Aleynikov 23' (yellow card) 61'; Sarkisov (yellow card) 65'	Report	Vilhena (yellow card) 2'; Cabella (yellow card) 50' (red card) 51'; Chernikov (yellow card) 67'	Stadium: Kuban Stadium; Referee: Evgeny Turbin

== Squad statistics ==
As of match played 21 May 2022

=== Appearances and goals ===
No.	Pos	Nat	Player	Total		Premier League		Russian Cup	
No.	Pos	Nat	Player	Apps	Goals	Apps	Goals	Apps	Goals
1	GK	(Russia) RUS	Yevgeni Gorodov	1	0	0+1	0	0	0
2	DF	(Russia) RUS	Yegor Sorokin	28	0	22+4	0	2	0
4	DF	(Belarus) BLR	Alyaksandr Martynovich	8	0	7+1	0	0	0
8	MF	(Russia) RUS	Yury Gazinsky	17	1	11+5	1	0+1	0
11	MF	(Russia) RUS	Aleksei Ionov	25	2	22+2	2	1	0
15	MF	(Russia) RUS	Aleks Matsukatov	6	0	2+4	0	0	0
18	DF	(Russia) RUS	Yevgeni Chernov	10	0	6+4	0	0	0
23	MF	(Russia) RUS	Vyacheslav Yakimov	10	0	4+6	0	0	0
28	DF	(Russia) RUS	Grigory Zhilkin	1	0	1	0	0	0
29	FW	(Russia) RUS	Vladimir Ilyin	24	4	8+14	4	2	0
32	DF	(Russia) RUS	Dmitri Pivovarov	2	0	2	0	0	0
38	MF	(Russia) RUS	David Kokoyev	1	0	0+1	0	0	0
39	GK	(Russia) RUS	Matvei Safonov	27	0	27	0	0	0
40	FW	(Nigeria) NGR	Olakunle Olusegun	9	0	9	0	0	0
41	DF	(Russia) RUS	Mikhail Sukhoruchenko	1	0	0+1	0	0	0
44	DF	(Russia) RUS	Sergei Borodin	4	0	4	0	0	0
48	DF	(Russia) RUS	Oleg Isayenko	8	0	8	0	0	0
50	DF	(Russia) RUS	Vitali Stezhko	2	0	2	0	0	0
53	MF	(Russia) RUS	Aleksandr Chernikov	25	3	21+2	2	2	1
56	MF	(Russia) RUS	Bogdan Reykhmen	4	0	1+3	0	0	0
58	GK	(Russia) RUS	Stanislav Agkatsev	5	0	3	0	2	0
63	FW	(Russia) RUS	Nikita Sergeyev	1	0	0+1	0	0	0
69	FW	(Russia) RUS	Irakli Manelov	14	1	9+4	1	0+1	0
70	FW	(Russia) RUS	Vladislav Samko	6	0	0+6	0	0	0
74	MF	(Armenia) ARM	Eduard Spertsyan	27	8	22+3	8	1+1	0
79	FW	(Russia) RUS	Omar Popov	2	0	0+2	0	0	0
81	FW	(Russia) RUS	Leon Sabua	1	0	0+1	0	0	0
82	FW	(Russia) RUS	Sergei Volkov	4	1	2+2	1	0	0
84	DF	(Russia) RUS	Vyacheslav Litvinov	8	0	4+3	0	1	0
85	FW	(Nigeria) NGR	Jonathan Okoronkwo	2	0	1+1	0	0	0
86	DF	(Russia) RUS	Daniil Kornyushin	5	0	3	0	1+1	0
88	MF	(Russia) RUS	Nikita Krivtsov	22	2	13+7	2	2	0
92	FW	(Russia) RUS	Ruslan Apekov	5	0	0+5	0	0	0
94	MF	(Russia) RUS	Dmitry Kuchugura	1	0	0+1	0	0	0
98	DF	(Russia) RUS	Sergei Petrov	16	0	15	0	1	0
Players who suspended their contracts:
3	MF	(Poland) POL	Grzegorz Krychowiak	15	5	14	4	1	1
6	DF	(Ecuador) ECU	Cristian Ramírez	13	0	11+1	0	0+1	0
9	FW	(Colombia) COL	Jhon Córdoba	16	6	12+3	6	0+1	0
31	MF	(Brazil) BRA	Kaio	16	0	14+2	0	0	0
Players away from the club on loan:
52	MF	(Netherlands) NED	Tonny Vilhena	15	2	11+2	2	2	0
93	FW	(Russia) RUS	Magomed-Shapi Suleymanov	4	0	1+3	0	0	0
Players who left Krasnodar during the season:
5	DF	(Serbia) SRB	Uroš Spajić	11	1	7+3	1	1	0
7	MF	(France) FRA	Rémy Cabella	18	4	15+1	4	2	0
16	MF	(Sweden) SWE	Viktor Claesson	20	3	16+2	3	0+2	0
89	MF	(Russia) RUS	Dmitry Stotsky	8	0	0+6	0	1+1	0

=== Goal scorers ===
Place	Position	Nation	Number	Name	Premier League	Russian Cup	Total
1	MF	(Armenia)	74	Eduard Spertsyan	8	0	8
2	FW	(Colombia)	9	Jhon Córdoba	6	0	6
3	MF	(Poland)	3	Grzegorz Krychowiak	4	1	5
4	MF	(France)	7	Rémy Cabella	4	0	4
4	FW	(Russia)	29	Vladimir Ilyin	4	0	4
6	MF	(Sweden)	16	Viktor Claesson	3	0	3
6	MF	(Russia)	53	Aleksandr Chernikov	2	1	3
8	MF	(Netherlands)	52	Tonny Vilhena	2	0	2
8	MF	(Russia)	11	Aleksei Ionov	2	0	2
8	MF	(Russia)	88	Nikita Krivtsov	2	0	2
11	DF	(Serbia)	5	Uroš Spajić	1	0	1
11	MF	(Russia)	8	Yury Gazinsky	1	0	1
11	FW	(Russia)	82	Sergei Volkov	1	0	1
11	FW	(Russia)	69	Irakli Manelov	1	0	1
11				Own goal	1	0	1
				TOTALS	41	2	43

=== Clean sheets ===
Place	Position	Nation	Number	Name	Premier League	Russian Cup	Total
1	GK	(Russia)	39	Matvei Safonov	8	0	8
2	GK	(Russia)	58	Stanislav Agkatsev	1	1	2
				TOTALS	9	1	10

=== Disciplinary record ===
Number	Nation	Position	Name	Premier League		Russian Cup		Total	
Number	Nation	Position	Name	Yellow card	Red card	Yellow card	Red card	Yellow card	Red card
2	(Russia)	DF	Yegor Sorokin	4	1	0	0	4	1
4	(Belarus)	DF	Alyaksandr Martynovich	2	0	0	0	2	0
8	(Russia)	MF	Yury Gazinsky	4	0	0	0	4	0
11	(Russia)	MF	Aleksei Ionov	1	0	0	0	1	0
15	(Russia)	MF	Aleks Matsukatov	1	0	0	0	1	0
23	(Russia)	MF	Vyacheslav Yakimov	2	0	0	0	2	0
29	(Russia)	FW	Vladimir Ilyin	2	0	1	0	3	0
32	(Russia)	DF	Dmitri Pivovarov	1	0	0	0	1	0
39	(Russia)	GK	Matvei Safonov	1	0	0	0	1	0
44	(Russia)	DF	Sergei Borodin	2	0	0	0	2	0
50	(Russia)	DF	Vitali Stezhko	1	0	0	0	1	0
53	(Russia)	MF	Aleksandr Chernikov	17	3	1	0	18	3
69	(Russia)	FW	Irakli Manelov	1	0	0	0	1	0
70	(Russia)	FW	Vladislav Samko	1	0	0	0	1	0
74	(Armenia)	MF	Eduard Spertsyan	4	0	1	0	5	0
84	(Russia)	DF	Vyacheslav Litvinov	2	0	0	0	2	0
86	(Russia)	DF	Daniil Kornyushin	1	0	0	0	1	0
88	(Russia)	MF	Nikita Krivtsov	3	0	1	0	4	0
92	(Russia)	FW	Ruslan Apekov	1	1	0	0	1	1
98	(Russia)	DF	Sergei Petrov	2	0	0	0	2	0
Players who suspended their contracts:
3	(Poland)	MF	Grzegorz Krychowiak	2	2	0	0	2	2
6	(Ecuador)	DF	Cristian Ramírez	4	0	0	0	4	0
9	(Colombia)	FW	Jhon Córdoba	2	0	0	0	2	0
Players away on loan:
52	(Netherlands)	MF	Tonny Vilhena	4	0	1	0	5	0
Players who left Krasnodar during the season:
5	(Serbia)	DF	Uroš Spajić	1	1	0	0	1	1
7	(France)	MF	Rémy Cabella	3	0	1	1	4	1
16	(Sweden)	MF	Viktor Claesson	3	0	0	0	3	0
			TOTALS	72	8	6	1	78	9
