= Aleks Matsukatov =

Russian footballer

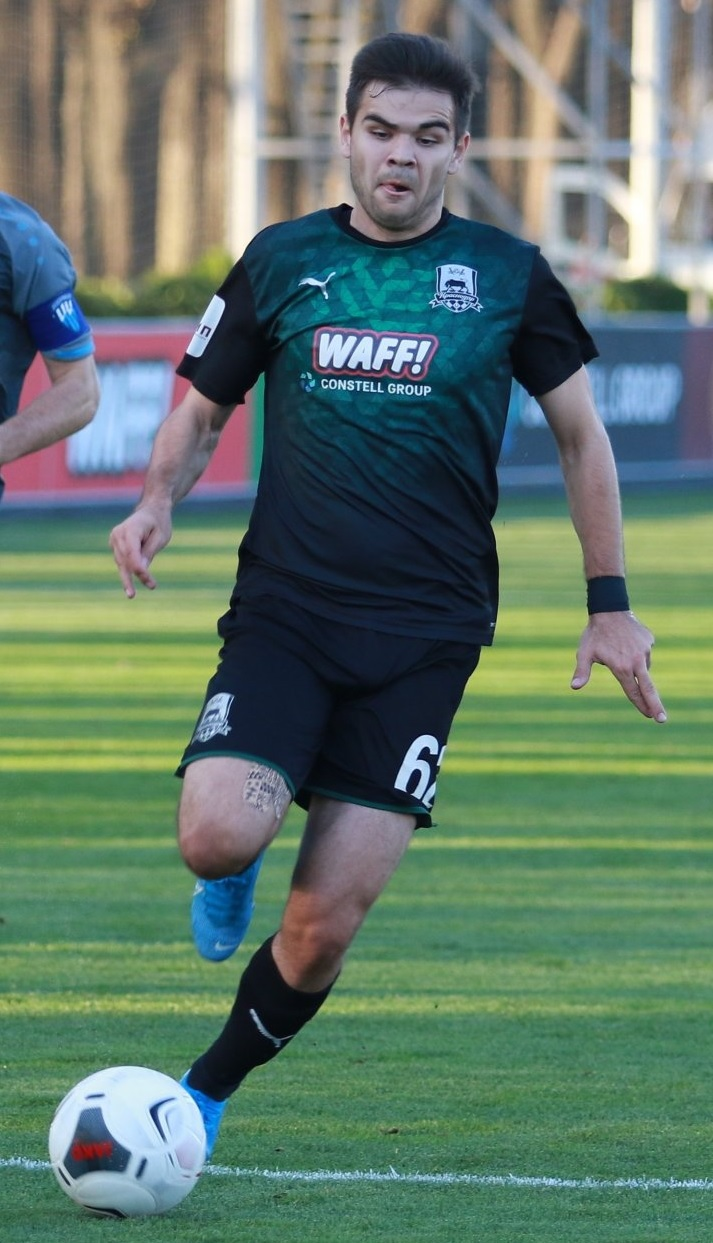
- Matsukatov with Krasnodar-2 in 2019

Personal information
- Full name: Aleks Romanovich Matsukatov
- Date of birth: 11 January 1999 (age 27)
- Place of birth: Oktyabrskoye, Russia
- Height: 1.80 m (5 ft 11 in)
- Position: Attacking midfielder

Team information
- Current team: Amkar Perm
- Number: 8

Youth career
- 2015–2018: Krasnodar

Senior career*
Years	Team	Apps	(Gls)
2016–2023	Krasnodar-2	106	(13)
2018–2023	Krasnodar	15	(0)
2023	→ Akron Tolyatti (loan)	6	(0)
2023–2024	Arsenal Tula	10	(0)
2024–2025	Murom	29	(3)
2025–	Amkar Perm	20	(1)

International career^{‡}
2014	Russia U16	1	(0)
2017	Russia U21	2	(0)
- * Club domestic league appearances and goals as of 17 October 2026 ‡ National team caps and goals as of 31 May 2017

Aleks Romanovich Matsukatov (Russian: Алекс Романович Мацукатов; born 11 January 1999) is a Russian football player who plays as an attacking midfielder for Amkar Perm.

== Club career ==
He made his debut in the Russian Professional Football League for Krasnodar-2 on 29 July 2016 in a game against FC Sochi. He made his Russian Football National League debut for Krasnodar-2 on 17 July 2018 in a game against FC Sibir Novosibirsk.

He made his Russian Premier League debut for Krasnodar on 19 July 2020 in a game against Dynamo Moscow, substituting Daniil Utkin in the 76th minute.

On 22 February 2023, Matsukatov joined Akron Tolyatti on loan with an option to buy.

On 30 June 2023, Matsukatov signed with Arsenal Tula.

== Career statistics ==
As of 27 November 2022

Club	Season	League			Cup		Continental		Other		Total	
Club	Season	Division	Apps	Goals	Apps	Goals	Apps	Goals	Apps	Goals	Apps	Goals
Krasnodar-2	2016–17	PFL	18	4	–		–		5 (Note: Appearances in the FNL Cup)	2	23	6
Krasnodar-2	2017–18	PFL	5	1	–		–		4	0	9	1
Krasnodar-2	2018–19	First League	20	2	–		–		3	0	23	2
Krasnodar-2	2019–20	First League	25	0	–		–		–		25	0
Krasnodar-2	2020–21	First League	24	3	–		–		–		24	3
Krasnodar-2	2021–22	First League	7	2	–		–		–		7	2
Krasnodar-2	2022–23	First League	7	1	–		–		–		7	1
Krasnodar-2	Total		106	13	0	0	0	0	12	2	118	15
Krasnodar	2017–18	RPL	0	0	0	0	0	0	–		0	0
Krasnodar	2018–19	RPL	0	0	0	0	0	0	–		0	0
Krasnodar	2019–20	RPL	2	0	0	0	0	0	–		2	0
Krasnodar	2020–21	RPL	6	0	0	0	0	0	–		6	0
Krasnodar	2021–22	RPL	6	0	0	0	–		–		6	0
Krasnodar	2022–23	RPL	1	0	3	0	–		–		4	0
Krasnodar	Total		15	0	3	0	0	0	0	0	18	0
Career total			121	13	3	0	0	0	12	2	136	15
