= Jonathan Okoronkwo =

Nigerian footballer

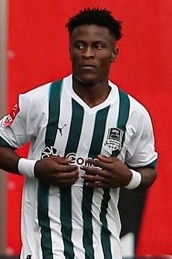
- Okoronkwo with Krasnodar in 2022

Personal information
- Full name: Jonathan Theophilus Okoronkwo
- Date of birth: 13 September 2003 (age 23)
- Place of birth: Calabar, Nigeria
- Height: 1.75 m (5 ft 9 in)
- Position: Striker

Team information
- Current team: Torpedo Moscow
- Number: 20

Youth career
- Diamond Star Calabar
- Hope of Glory

Senior career*
Years	Team	Apps	(Gls)
2019–2021	Vista Gelendzhik		
2021–2022	Botev Plovdiv	0	(0)
2022	→ Krasnodar-2 (loan)	4	(2)
2022	→ Krasnodar (loan)	2	(0)
2022–2024	Krasnodar	1	(0)
2022–2023	Krasnodar-2	14	(0)
2023–2024	→ Arsenal Tula (loan)	30	(17)
2024–2026	Hatayspor	22	(3)
2026	Sivasspor	13	(2)
2026–	Torpedo Moscow	1	(1)
- * Club domestic league appearances and goals as of 4 September 2026

Jonathan Theophilus Okoronkwo (born 13 September 2003) is a Nigerian professional footballer who plays as a striker for Russian club Torpedo Moscow.

== Club career ==
Okoronkwo joined Krasnodar-2 in Russia on loan from Bulgarian club Botev Plovdiv on 22 February 2022. He made his debut in the Russian Football National League for Krasnodar-2 on 8 March 2022 in a game against Baltika Kaliningrad.

In April 2022, Okoronkwo was promoted to the main squad of Krasnodar and made his Russian Premier League debut on 3 April 2022 in a game against Dynamo Moscow.

On 14 June 2022, Okoronkwo transferred to Krasnodar on a permanent basis and signed a four-year contract with the club.

On 5 July 2023, Okoronkwo joined Arsenal Tula on a season-long loan.

On 12 July 2024, Okoronkwo signed a three-year contract with Hatayspor in Turkey.

== Career statistics ==
As of 27 November 2022

Club	Season	League			Russian Cup		Total	
Club	Season	Division	Apps	Goals	Apps	Goals	Apps	Goals
Krasnodar-2	2021–22	First League	4	2	–		4	2
Krasnodar-2	2022–23	First League	2	0	–		2	0
Krasnodar-2	Total		6	2	–		6	2
Krasnodar	2021–22	Russian Premier League	2	0	–		2	0
Krasnodar	2022–23	Russian Premier League	1	0	2	0	3	0
Krasnodar	Total		3	0	2	0	5	0
Career total			9	2	2	0	11	2

== Honours ==
Individual

- Russian First League top scorer: 2023–24 (17 goals).
