= Igor Paradin =

Russian footballer

Personal information
- Full name: Igor Aleksandrovich Paradin
- Date of birth: 10 September 1998 (age 28)
- Place of birth: Mostovskoy, Russia
- Height: 1.76 m (5 ft 9 in)
- Position: Defender

Senior career*
Years	Team	Apps	(Gls)
2015–2021	FC Krasnodar	0	(0)
2016–2019	→ FC Krasnodar-2	61	(1)
2018–2019	→ FC Krasnodar-3	13	(0)
2019–2020	→ FK Teplice (loan)	12	(0)
2020–2021	→ FC Chayka Peschanokopskoye (loan)	4	(0)
2021	→ FC Mashuk-KMV Pyatigorsk (loan)	11	(0)
2022–2024	FC Kuban-Holding Pavlovskaya	58	(2)
- * Club domestic league appearances and goals as of 16 November 2024

Igor Aleksandrovich Paradin (Russian: Игорь Александрович Парадин; born 10 September 1998) is a Russian football player.

== Club career ==
He made his debut in the Russian Professional Football League for FC Krasnodar-2 on 29 July 2016 in a game against FC Sochi.

On 28 June 2019, he joined Czech club FK Teplice on loan.
