= Eduard Spertsyan =

Armenian footballer (born 2000)

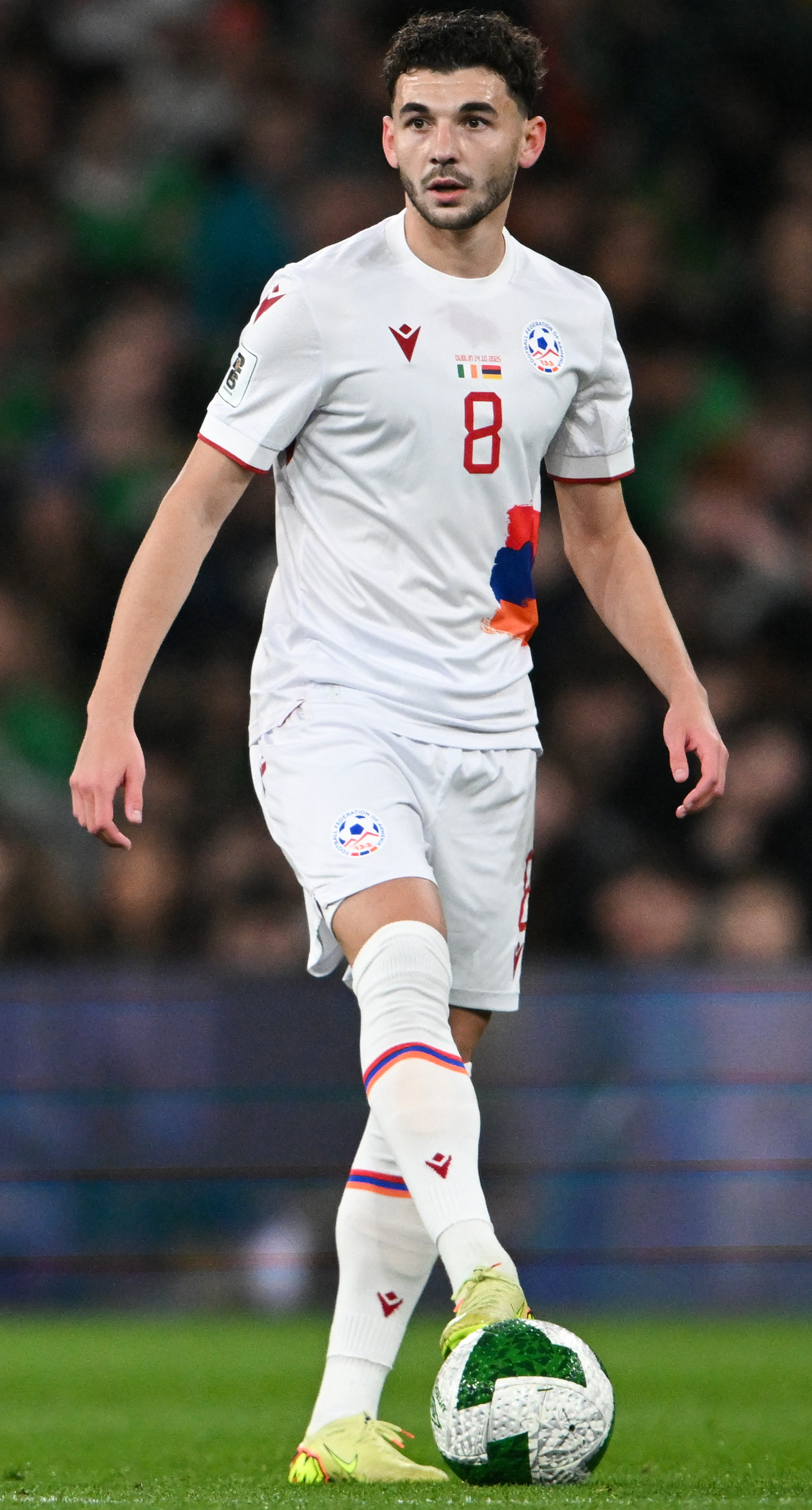
- Spertsyan with Armenia in 2025

Personal information
- Full name: Eduard Mkrtychevich Spertsyan
- Date of birth: 7 June 2000 (age 26)
- Place of birth: Stavropol, Russia
- Height: 1.78 m (5 ft 10 in)
- Position: Attacking midfielder

Team information
- Current team: Al-Ahli
- Number: 8

Youth career
- 2010–2018: Krasnodar

Senior career*
Years	Team	Apps	(Gls)
2018–2019	Krasnodar-3	13	(1)
2018–2021	Krasnodar-2	74	(17)
2018–2026	Krasnodar	145	(53)
2026–	Al-Ahli	11	(2)

International career^{‡}
2021–	Armenia	46	(13)
- * Club domestic league appearances and goals as of 20 November 2026 ‡ National team caps and goals as of 5 October 2026

Eduard Mkrtychevich Spertsyan (Armenian: Էդուարդ Մկրտիչի Սպերցյան; Russian: Эдуард Мкртычевич Сперцян; born 7 June 2000) is a professional footballer who plays as an attacking midfielder for Saudi Pro League club Al-Ahli. Born in Russia, he plays for the Armenia national team.

== Club career ==
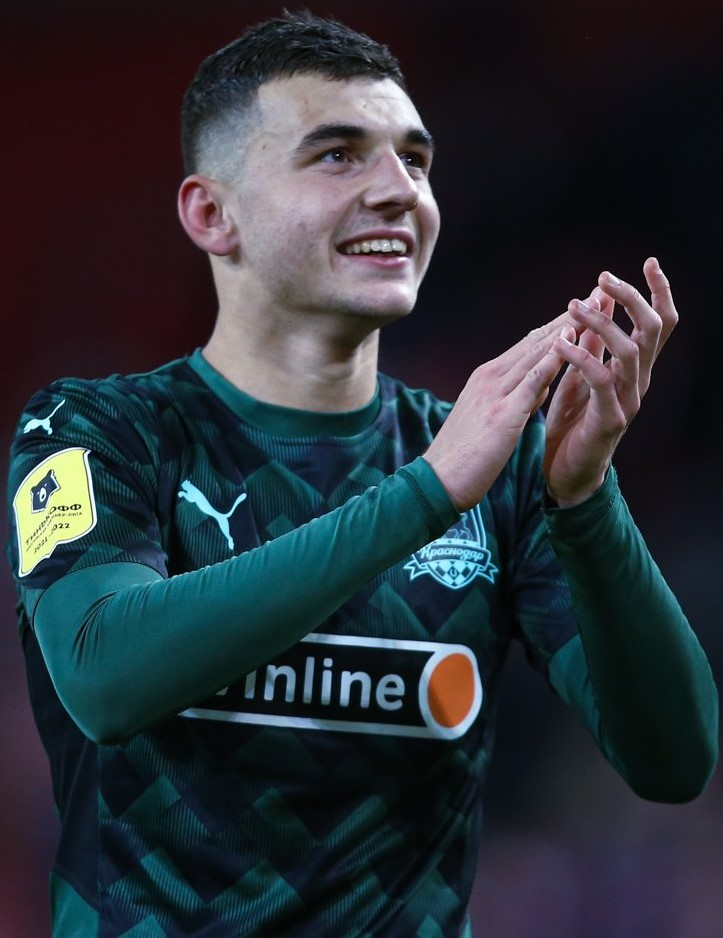
Spertsyan with Krasnodar in 2022

Spertsyan made his debut in the Russian Professional Football League for FC Krasnodar-2 on 17 March 2018 in a game against FC Biolog-Novokubansk. He made his Russian Football National League debut for Krasnodar-2 on 1 October 2018 in a game against FC Khimki.

After scoring seven goals in the first nine games of the FNL season for FC Krasnodar-2, Spertsyan made his Russian Premier League debut for FC Krasnodar on 18 September 2020 in a match against FC Khimki. On 28 October 2020, he made his European debut as a late substitute in the Champions League 4–0 home loss against Chelsea, making him the youngest ever Armenia national team player to ever play UEFA Champions League group stages, surpassing Henrikh Mkhitaryan for over one year and one month.

On 7 July 2026, Saudi Pro League club Al-Ahli announced the signing of Spertsyan to a four-year contract.

== International career ==
On 17 February 2021, the Football Federation of Armenia confirmed that Spertsyan would join the Armenia national team in March to prepare for the World Cup qualifiers. Spertsyan made his debut for the national team on 31 March 2021 against Romania. He came on as a substitute at half-time, scoring in the 56th minute at the Republican Stadium. He scored in two Nations League matches against Ireland. He scored the only goal in a match in Yerevan for Armenia to get the win, as well as at the away game in Dublin as Ireland would go on to win 3–2 at the Aviva Stadium. On 17 October 2023 he scored the only goal for Armenia in a friendly game vs North Macedonia from a freekick.

On 7 November 2025, it was announced that Spertsyan had become the captain of the Armenian national team.

== Personal life ==
Spertsyan was born into a mixed family. His father, an ethnic Armenian, was previously involved in the tobacco business, and his mother has Russian-German roots (her maiden name was Ekman). The footballer has an older brother, Eric, with whom the age difference is three years.

Spertsyan married Alina Karapetyan on 23 June 2023. The celebration took place in Pyatigorsk and was organized in the traditional Armenian style. Alina is a relative of the former Armenian national team footballer Aleksandr Karapetyan.

== Career statistics ==
=== Club ===
As of match played 26 August 2026

Appearances and goals by club, season and competition
Club	Season	League			National cup (Note: Includes Russian Cup, King's Cup)		Continental		Other		Total	
Club	Season	Division	Apps	Goals	Apps	Goals	Apps	Goals	Apps	Goals	Apps	Goals
Krasnodar-2	2017–18	Russian Football National League 2	11	1	—		—		—		11	1
Krasnodar-2	2018–19	Russian Football National League	11	0	—		—		5 (Note: Appearances in FNL Cup)	0	16	0
Krasnodar-2	2019–20	Russian Football National League	20	0	—		—		—		20	0
Krasnodar-2	2020–21	Russian Football National League	32	16	—		—		—		32	16
Krasnodar-2	Total		74	17	—		—		5	0	79	17
Krasnodar-3	2018–19	Russian Second League	12	1	—		—		—		12	1
Krasnodar-3	2019–20	Russian Second League	1	0	—		—		—		1	0
Krasnodar-3	Total		13	1	—		—		—		13	1
Krasnodar	2020–21	Russian Premier League	5	0	0	0	2 (Note: Appearances in UEFA Champions League)	0	—		7	0
Krasnodar	2021–22	Russian Premier League	25	8	2	0	—		—		27	8
Krasnodar	2022–23	Russian Premier League	28	10	13	4	—		—		41	14
Krasnodar	2023–24	Russian Premier League	29	11	4	0	—		—		33	11
Krasnodar	2024–25	Russian Premier League	28	11	6	0	—		1 (Note: Appearance in Russian Super Cup)	0	35	11
Krasnodar	2025–26	Russian Premier League	30	13	11	1	—		1	0	42	14
Krasnodar	Total		145	53	36	5	2	0	2	0	185	58
Al-Ahli	2026–27	Saudi Pro League	2	1	1	1	0	0	1 (Note: Appearance in FIFA Intercontinental Cup)	0	4	2
Career total			234	72	37	6	2	0	8	0	281	78

=== International ===
As of match played 5 October 2026

Appearances and goals by national team and year
National team	Year	Apps	Goals
Armenia	2021	7	1
Armenia	2022	6	2
Armenia	2023	10	1
Armenia	2024	9	2
Armenia	2025	8	5
Armenia	2026	6	2
Total		46	13

Scores and results list Armenia's goal tally first, score column indicates score after each Spertsyan goal.

List of international goals scored by Eduard Spertsyan
No.	Date	Venue	Opponent	Score	Result	Competition
1	31 March 2021	Vazgen Sargsyan Republican Stadium, Yerevan, Armenia	Romania	1–0	3–2	2022 FIFA World Cup qualification
2	4 June 2022	Vazgen Sargsyan Republican Stadium, Yerevan, Armenia	Republic of Ireland	1–0	1–0	2022–23 UEFA Nations League B
3	27 September 2022	Aviva Stadium, Dublin, Republic of Ireland	Republic of Ireland	2–2	2–3	2022–23 UEFA Nations League B
4	17 October 2023	Stadion Blagoj Istatov, Strumica, North Macedonia	North Macedonia	1–3	1–3	Friendly
5	7 September 2024	Vazgen Sargsyan Republican Stadium, Yerevan, Armenia	Latvia	4–1	4–1	2024–25 UEFA Nations League C
6	17 November 2024	Skonto Stadium, Riga, Latvia	Latvia	1–0	2–1	2024–25 UEFA Nations League C
7	6 June 2025	Fadil Vokrri Stadium, Pristina, Kosovo	Kosovo	2–1	2–5	Friendly
8	9 June 2025	Gradski Stadium, Nikšić, Montenegro	Montenegro	1–0	2–2	Friendly
9	9 June 2025	Gradski Stadium, Nikšić, Montenegro	Montenegro	2–2	2–2	Friendly
10	9 September 2025	Vazgen Sargsyan Republican Stadium, Yerevan, Armenia	Republic of Ireland	1–0	2–1	2026 FIFA World Cup qualification
11	16 November 2025	Estádio do Dragão, Porto, Portugal	Portugal	1–1	1–9	2026 FIFA World Cup qualification
12	6 June 2026	Vazgen Sargsyan Republican Stadium, Yerevan, Armenia	Kazakhstan	1–1	1–1	Friendly
13	28 September 2026	Vazgen Sargsyan Republican Stadium, Yerevan, Armenia	Montenegro	2–2	2–3	2026–27 UEFA Nations League C

== Honours ==
FC Krasnodar

- Russian Premier League: 2024–25
- Russian Cup runner-up: 2022–23

Individual

- Armenian Footballer of the Year: 2022, 2025
- Russian Premier League Midfielder of the Season: 2022–23, 2023–24, 2025–26
- Russian Premier League Team of the Season: 2022–23
- Russian Premier League Player of the Month: October 2023, November/December 2025
- Russian Premier League Goal of the Month: April 2024 (on 24 April against Baltika Kaliningrad)
