= Sergei Borodin (footballer, born 1999) =

Russian football player

Sergei Borodin Сергей Бородин
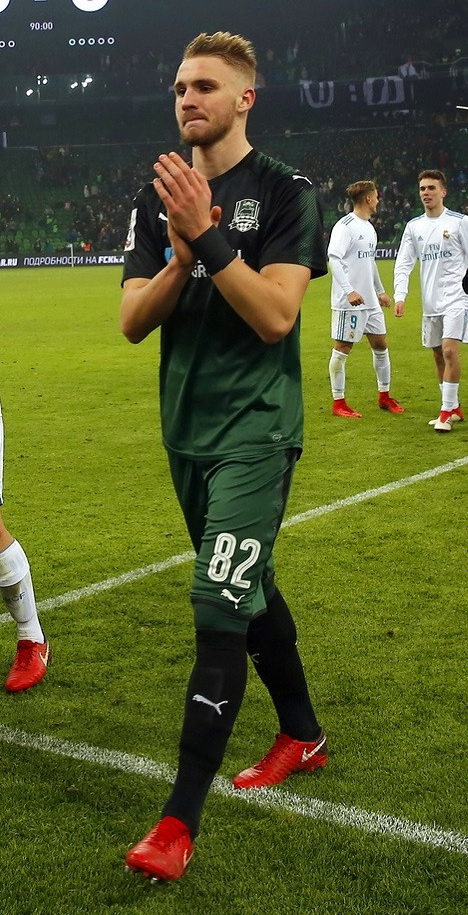
- Borodin with Krasnodar U-21 in 2018

Personal information
- Full name: Sergei Alekseyevich Borodin
- Date of birth: 30 January 1999 (age 27)
- Place of birth: Lazarevskoye, Krasnodar Krai, Russia
- Height: 1.88 m (6 ft 2 in)
- Position: Centre-back

Team information
- Current team: FC Torpedo Moscow
- Number: 4

Youth career
- –2016: FC Krasnodar

Senior career*
Years	Team	Apps	(Gls)
2016–2023	FC Krasnodar	14	(1)
2016–2020	→ FC Krasnodar-2	41	(1)
2019	→ FC Krasnodar-3	1	(0)
2020	→ FC Ufa (loan)	1	(0)
2021–2022	→ FC Krasnodar-2	38	(1)
2023	→ Beitar Jerusalem (loan)	13	(0)
2023–	Torpedo Moscow	90	(2)

International career^{‡}
2014	Russia U-15	2	(0)
2014–2015	Russia U-16	12	(0)
2015–2016	Russia U-17	10	(0)
2016–2017	Russia U-18	10	(0)
2017	Russia U-19	5	(0)
2019	Russia U-21	1	(0)
2022	Russia	1	(0)
- * Club domestic league appearances and goals as of 16 May 2026 ‡ National team caps and goals as of 24 September 2022

Sergei Alekseyevich Borodin (Russian: Сергей Алексеевич Бородин; born 30 January 1999) is a Russian football player who plays for FC Torpedo Moscow.

== Club career ==
He made his debut in the Russian Professional Football League for FC Krasnodar-2 on 2 September 2016 in a game against FC Dynamo Stavropol. He made his Russian Football National League debut for Krasnodar-2 on 17 July 2018 in a game against FC Sibir Novosibirsk.

On 28 August 2020, he joined FC Ufa on loan with an option to purchase. He made his Russian Premier League debut for Ufa on 17 December 2020 in a game against his main club FC Krasnodar. He substituted Bojan Jokić in the 48th minute. On 19 February 2021, Krasnodar terminated the loan early.

On 11 January 2023, Borodin was loaned by Beitar Jerusalem in Israel until 30 June 2023.

On 29 June 2023, Borodin signed a three-year contract with FC Torpedo Moscow.

== International career ==
Borodin was called up to the Russia national football team for the first time for a friendly against Kyrgyzstan in September 2022. He made his debut in that game on 24 September 2022.

== Career statistics ==
=== Club ===
As of match played 24 May 2025

Appearances and goals by club, season and competition
Club	Season	League			Cup		Continental		Other		Total	
Club	Season	Division	Apps	Goals	Apps	Goals	Apps	Goals	Apps	Goals	Apps	Goals
Krasnodar-2	2016–17	Russian Second League	4	0	—		—		5 (Note: Appearances in the FNL Cup)	0	9	0
Krasnodar-2	2017–18	Russian Second League	1	0	—		—		3	0	4	0
Krasnodar-2	2018–19	Russian First League	15	1	—		—		4	0	19	1
Krasnodar-2	2019–20	Russian First League	21	0	—		—		—		21	0
Krasnodar-2	2020–21	Russian First League	12	1	—		—		—		12	1
Krasnodar-2	2021–22	Russian First League	26	0	—		—		—		26	0
Krasnodar-2	Total		79	2	0	0	0	0	12	0	91	2
Krasnodar	2018–19	Russian Premier League	0	0	0	0	0	0	—		0	0
Krasnodar	2019–20	Russian Premier League	0	0	0	0	0	0	—		0	0
Krasnodar	2021–22	Russian Premier League	4	0	0	0	—		—		4	0
Krasnodar	2022–23	Russian Premier League	10	1	2	0	—		—		12	1
Krasnodar	Total		14	1	2	0	0	0	0	0	16	1
Krasnodar-3	2019–20	Russian Second League	1	0	—		—		—		1	0
Ufa (loan)	2020–21	Russian Premier League	1	0	0	0	—		—		1	0
Beitar Jerusalem (loan)	2022–23	Israeli Premier League	13	0	4	0	—		—		17	0
Torpedo Moscow	2023–24	Russian First League	31	0	1	0	—		—		32	0
Torpedo Moscow	2024–25	Russian First League	31	2	0	0	–		–		31	2
Torpedo Moscow	Total		62	2	1	0	0	0	0	0	63	2
Career total			170	5	7	0	0	0	12	0	189	5
