= Sergei Yeshchenko =

Russian footballer

Personal information
- Full name: Sergei Olegovich Yeshchenko
- Date of birth: 1 March 2001 (age 25)
- Place of birth: Starovelichkovskaya, Russia
- Height: 1.93 m (6 ft 4 in)
- Position: Goalkeeper

Team information
- Current team: FC Kaluga
- Number: 1

Youth career
- 2017–2019: FC Krasnodar

Senior career*
Years	Team	Apps	(Gls)
2018–2022	FC Krasnodar	0	(0)
2018–2021	→ FC Krasnodar-3	20	(0)
2018–2022	→ FC Krasnodar-2	18	(0)
2022	→ FC Fakel Voronezh (loan)	0	(0)
2022–2023	FC Kuban Krasnodar	1	(0)
2023–2024	FC Neftekhimik Nizhnekamsk	7	(0)
2024–2025	FC Avangard Kursk	16	(0)
2025	FC Spartak Kostroma	1	(0)
2026	FC Minsk	0	(0)
2026	→ FC Minsk-2	3	(0)
2026–	FC Kaluga	15	(0)

International career^{‡}
2016	Russia U-15	3	(0)
2016–2017	Russia U-16	5	(0)
2017–2018	Russia U-17	10	(0)
2018	Russia U-18	4	(0)
2019–2020	Russia U-19	2	(0)
- * Club domestic league appearances and goals as of 15 November 2026 ‡ National team caps and goals as of 11 February 2020

Sergei Olegovich Yeshchenko (Russian: Сергей Олегович Ещенко; born 1 March 2001) is a Russian football player who plays for FC Kaluga.

== Club career ==
He made his debut in the Russian Football National League for FC Krasnodar-2 on 4 October 2020 in a game against FC Nizhny Novgorod.

On 15 December 2021, he joined FC Fakel Voronezh on loan until the end of the season.

On 23 June 2022, Yeshchenko signed a one-year contract with FC Kuban Krasnodar.
