= Dmitri Kudinov =

Dmitri Kudinov may refer to:

- Dimitri Kudinov (born 1963), Georgian football player
- Dmitri Kudinov (footballer, born 1971), Russian football player
- Dmitri Kudinov (footballer, born 1985), Russian football player
- Dmitri Kudinov (football manager) (born 1985), Russian football manager
