= Dmitri Kudinov (football manager) =

Russian football manager

Personal information
- Full name: Dmitri Ivanovich Kudinov
- Date of birth: 14 November 1985 (age 40)

Team information
- Current team: FC Fakel Voronezh (assistant manager)

Managerial career
- Years: Team
- 2013–2014: FC Krasnodar-2
- 2014: FC Krasnodar-3 (assistant)
- 2014–2015: FC Krasnodar-2
- 2015–2016: FC Krasnodar-2 (assistant)
- 2016–2017: FC Krasnodar-2
- 2018–2021: FC Krasnodar-3
- 2021: FC Krasnodar (U-19)
- 2021–2022: FC Fakel-M Voronezh
- 2022–2024: FC Fakel Voronezh (U-19)
- 2024–: FC Fakel Voronezh (assistant)

Dmitri Ivanovich Kudinov (Russian: Дмитрий Иванович Кудинов; born 14 November 1985) is a Russian football manager. He is an assistant coach with FC Fakel Voronezh.
