= Krasnodar Academy Stadium =

Sports facility in Krasnodar Krai, Russia

FC Krasnodar Academy Stadium
- Interactive map of FC Krasnodar Academy Stadium
- Full name: FC Krasnodar Academy Stadium
- Location: Krasnodar; Russia
- Owner: FC Krasnodar
- Operator: FC Krasnodar-2; FC Krasnodar-3; WFC Krasnodar
- Capacity: 7,100
- Surface: Grass

Construction
- Built: 2011
- Closed: 2021

FC Krasnodar Academy Stadium is a football stadium situated in Krasnodar. It was the home stadium of FC Krasnodar-2, the reserve side of FC Krasnodar. It could accommodate a total capacity of 3,500 people and is roofed- also the FC Krasnodar Under-21 branch played there.

On July 26, 2021, the dismantling of the stadium began. On July 17, 2021, the new stadium of the FC Krasnodar Academy was opened.
