= FC Fakel-M Voronezh =

Football club from Voronezh, Russia

- Full name: Football Club Fakel-M Voronezh
- Founded: 1961; 64 years ago
- Manager: Dmitri Kudinov
- 2021–22: FNL 2, Group 3, 20th

FC Fakel-M Voronezh (Russian: «Факел-М» (Воронеж)) is a Russian football club based in Voronezh. It acts as the reserve-team for FC Fakel Voronezh.

== History ==
The club mostly played on the amateur level since its founding. It played in the professional 1997 Russian Third League as Fakel-d Voronezh, but dropped out before the season was complete. For the 2020–21 season, it entered the third-tier Russian Professional Football League. Following Fakel's promotion to the Russian Premier League for the 2022–23 season, the club entered the team into the youth league tournament (as in 2001 - into the reserves tournament).
