= 2020–21 Russian Professional Football League =

Russian Professional Football League
- Season: 2020–21

The 2020–21 Professional Football League was the third highest division in Russian football. The Professional Football League is geographically divided into 4 groups. The winners of each zone are automatically promoted into the National Football League. The bottom finishers of each zone lose professional status and are relegated into the Amateur Football League.

== Group 1 ==
=== Standings ===
Pos	Team	Pld	W	D	L	GF	GA	GD	Pts	Promotion or relegation
1	Kuban Krasnodar (P)	32	26	2	4	88	22	+66	80	Promotion to Russian National Football League
2	Kuban-Holding	32	24	5	3	63	24	+39	77	
3	Chernomorets	32	22	6	4	57	19	+38	72	
4	Legion Dynamo	32	16	13	3	56	22	+34	61	
5	SKA Rostov-on-Don	32	18	5	9	70	34	+36	59	
6	Anzhi	32	14	9	9	59	43	+16	51	
7	Dynamo Stavropol	32	14	6	12	51	45	+6	48	
8	Makhachkala	32	13	8	11	48	42	+6	47	
9	Forte	32	13	8	11	53	32	+21	47	
10	Spartak Nalchik	32	11	9	12	43	38	+5	42	
11	Biolog	32	12	3	17	61	53	+8	39	
12	Krasnodar-3 (Note: Team folded after season as the club decided not to apply for the PFL license for the 2021–22 season.)	32	10	6	16	40	57	−17	36	Dissolved after the season
13	Mashuk-KMV	32	9	7	16	40	56	−16	34	
14	Druzhba	32	7	4	21	27	79	−52	25	
15	Inter Cherkessk (Note: Team folded after season as the club failed to receive a PFL license for the 2021–22 season.)	32	4	6	22	28	89	−61	18	Dissolved after the season
16	Tuapse	32	4	3	25	37	112	−75	15	
17	Yessentuki	32	3	4	25	26	80	−54	13	

Rules for classification: 1. points won; 2. games won; 3. points in head-to-head matches; 4. games won in head-to-head matches; 5. goal difference in head-to-head matches; 6. goals scored in head-to-head matches; 7. away goals in head-to-head matches; 8. total goal difference; 9. total goals scored; 10. total away goals scored.
(P) Promoted

=== Top goalscorers ===
As of match played 2 June 2021

Rank	Player	Club	Goals
1	(Russia) Georgi Gongadze	SKA Rostov-on-Don	16
2	(Russia) Rizvan Akhmedkhanov	Chernomorets Novorossiysk	14
3	(Russia) Ivan Timoshenko	Chernomorets Novorossiysk	13
3	(Russia) Pavel Solomatin	Yessentuki	13
5	(Russia) Aleksei Shulgin	Kuban Krasnodar	12
6	(Russia) Magomed Magomedov	Anzhi Makhachkala	11
6	(Russia) Magomednabi Yagyayev	Anzhi Makhachkala	11
6	(Russia) Rashid Magomedov	Legion Dynamo Makhachkala	11
6	(Russia) Abu-Said Eldarushev	Legion Dynamo Makhachkala	11
6	(Russia) Khasan Mamtov	Kuban Krasnodar	11

== Group 2 ==
=== Standings ===
Pos	Team	Pld	W	D	L	GF	GA	GD	Pts	Promotion or relegation
1	Olimp-Dolgoprudny (P)	30	22	6	2	51	18	+33	72	Promotion to Russian National Football League
2	Zenit-2 Saint Petersburg	30	17	8	5	56	26	+30	59	
3	Tver	30	18	5	7	56	27	+29	59	
4	Dynamo-2 Moscow	30	17	7	6	63	37	+26	58	
5	Leningradets	30	16	6	8	51	29	+22	54	
6	Kazanka	30	13	9	8	52	39	+13	48	
7	Rodina	30	12	9	9	59	46	+13	45	
8	Zvezda Saint Petersburg	30	11	12	7	44	29	+15	45	
9	Torpedo Vladimir	30	12	3	15	40	40	0	39	
10	Znamya Truda	30	8	9	13	31	39	−8	33	
11	Smolensk	30	8	7	15	26	46	−20	31	
12	Murom	30	7	9	14	32	42	−10	30	
13	Luki-Energiya	30	9	3	18	31	56	−25	30	
14	Chita	30	7	4	19	26	66	−40	25	
15	Kolomna	30	5	7	18	38	63	−25	22	
16	Zenit Irkutsk (R)	30	5	2	23	15	68	−53	17	Relegation to Amateur Football League

Rules for classification: 1. points won; 2. games won; 3. points in head-to-head matches; 4. games won in head-to-head matches; 5. goal difference in head-to-head matches; 6. goals scored in head-to-head matches; 7. away goals in head-to-head matches; 8. total goal difference; 9. total goals scored; 10. total away goals scored.
(P) Promoted; (R) Relegated

== Group 3 ==
=== Standings ===
Pos	Team	Pld	W	D	L	GF	GA	GD	Pts	Promotion or relegation
1	Metallurg Lipetsk (P)	30	19	6	5	59	28	+31	63	Promotion to Russian National Football League
2	Ryazan	30	19	2	9	57	33	+24	59	
3	Saturn	30	17	7	6	63	29	+34	58	
4	Salyut	30	16	8	6	56	25	+31	56	
5	Sokol	30	16	7	7	44	21	+23	55	
6	Strogino	30	15	3	12	51	42	+9	48	
7	Kaluga	30	14	5	11	50	37	+13	47	
8	Khimik-Arsenal	30	11	10	9	45	41	+4	43	
9	Znamya	30	11	10	9	44	38	+6	43	
10	Krasny (R)	30	11	7	12	40	49	−9	40	Relegation to Amateur Football League
11	Avangard	30	9	9	12	35	41	−6	36	
12	Khimki-M	30	10	2	18	42	65	−23	32	
13	Kvant	30	7	7	16	31	54	−23	28	
14	Metallurg Vidnoye	30	8	1	21	32	76	−44	25	
15	Fakel-M	30	5	5	20	22	64	−42	20	
16	Sakhalin	30	4	7	19	26	54	−28	19	

Rules for classification: 1. points won; 2. games won; 3. points in head-to-head matches; 4. games won in head-to-head matches; 5. goal difference in head-to-head matches; 6. goals scored in head-to-head matches; 7. away goals in head-to-head matches; 8. total goal difference; 9. total goals scored; 10. total away goals scored.
(P) Promoted; (R) Relegated

== Group 4 ==
=== Standings ===
Pos	Team	Pld	W	D	L	GF	GA	GD	Pts	Promotion or relegation
1	KAMAZ (P)	28	21	1	6	75	25	+50	64	Promotion to Russian National Football League
2	Tyumen	28	19	6	3	55	22	+33	63	
3	Chelyabinsk	28	19	2	7	62	22	+40	59	
4	Volga	28	18	5	5	45	15	+30	59	
5	Novosibirsk	28	17	7	4	53	25	+28	58	
6	Zvezda Perm	28	17	4	7	54	29	+25	55	
7	Dynamo Barnaul	28	14	2	12	33	38	−5	44	
8	Nosta	28	10	6	12	38	40	−2	36	
9	Ural-2	28	9	8	11	39	40	−1	35	
10	Volna	28	10	5	13	32	39	−7	35	
11	Lada Dimitrovgrad (R)	28	6	9	13	33	34	−1	27	Relegation to Amateur Football League
12	Zenit-Izhevsk	28	5	7	16	31	43	−12	22	
13	Lada-Tolyatti	28	3	4	21	15	100	−85	13	
14	Krylia Sovetov-2	28	3	3	22	25	63	−38	12	
15	Orenburg-2	28	3	3	22	15	70	−55	12	

Rules for classification: 1. points won; 2. games won; 3. points in head-to-head matches; 4. games won in head-to-head matches; 5. goal difference in head-to-head matches; 6. goals scored in head-to-head matches; 7. away goals in head-to-head matches; 8. total goal difference; 9. total goals scored; 10. total away goals scored.
(P) Promoted; (R) Relegated
