= 2022–23 Russian First League =

Russian First League
- Season: 2022–23
- Dates: 16 July 2022 — 3 June 2023
- Champions: Rubin Kazan
- Promoted: Rubin Kazan; Baltika
- Relegated: Krasnodar-2; Volga; Veles; Ufa
- Matches played: 306
- Goals scored: 703 (2.3 per match)
- Top goalscorer: Gedeon Guzina (14 goals)
- Biggest home win: SKA 6-0 Veles Moscow; 23 October 2022; SKA-Khabarovsk 6-0 Arsenal Tula; 3 June 2023
- Biggest away win: Arsenal Tula 0–5 Baltika; 25 November 2022
- Highest scoring: Rubin Kazan 5-2 Krasnodar-2; 16 October 2022; FC Alania 5-2 Krasnodar-2; 13 May 2023; Krasnodar-2 5-2 Veles Moscow; 20 May 2023
- Longest winning run: Rubin Kazan (7 matches)
- Longest unbeaten run: Baltika (30 matches)
- Longest winless run: Krasnodar-2 (15 matches)
- Longest losing run: Krasnodar-2 (6 matches)
- All statistics correct as of 27 May 2023.

The 2022–23 Russian First League was the 31st season of Russia's second-tier football league since the dissolution of the Soviet Union. The season began on 16 July 2022, and will have a 3 month winter break between game weeks 20 and 21 (November to March). For the first time, 18 teams will participate instead of 20 On 23 June 2022, the league was renamed from Russian Football National League to Russian First League.

== Stadia by capacity ==
Club	City	Stadium	Capacity
Akron	Tolyatti	Kristall Stadium, Zhigulyovsk	1,565
Alania	Vladikavkaz	Republican Spartak Stadium	32,464
Arsenal Tula	Tula	Arsenal Stadium	19,241
Baltika	Kaliningrad	Arena Baltika	35,212
Dynamo Makhachkala	Makhachkala	Dynamo Stadium	15,200
KAMAZ	Naberezhnye Chelny	KAMAZ Stadium	6,248
Rubin Kazan	Kazan	Kazan Arena	45,379
Krasnodar-2	Krasnodar	Krasnodar Academy	3,500
Kuban Krasnodar	Krasnodar	Kuban Stadium	35,200
Neftekhimik	Nizhnekamsk	Neftekhimik Stadium	3,100
Rodina Moscow	Moscow	Spartakovets	5,000
SKA	Khabarovsk	Lenin Stadium	15,200
Ufa	Ufa	BetBoom Arena	15,234
Volga Ulyanovsk	Ulyanovsk	Trud Stadium	15,000
Veles Moscow	Moscow	Avangard Stadium, Domodedovo	5,503
Volgar Astrakhan	Astrakhan	Central Stadium	21,500
Shinnik Yaroslavl	Yaroslavl	Shinnik Stadium	22,990
Yenisey	Krasnoyarsk	Central Stadium	15,000

1. Alania plays at Akhmat-Arena, Grozny, capacity 30,000, while their own stadium is under reconstruction

== Team changes ==
=== To FNL ===
Promoted from FNL2

- Dynamo Makhachkala
- Rodina Moscow
- Volga Ulyanovsk
- Shinnik Yaroslavl

Relegated from Premier League

- Arsenal Tula
- Rubin Kazan
- Ufa

=== From FNL ===
Relegated to Second League

- Metallurg Lipetsk
- Rotor Volgograd
- Tekstilshchik Ivanovo

Dissolved

- FC Spartak-2 Moscow
- Olimp-Dolgoprudny
- Tom Tomsk

Promoted to Premier League

- Torpedo Moscow
- Orenburg
- Fakel Voronezh

== Stadia by locations ==
Location of teams in 2022–23 First League.

== League table ==
Pos	Team	Pld	W	D	L	GF	GA	GD	Pts	Promotion, qualification or relegation
1	Rubin Kazan (C, P)	34	19	12	3	53	27	+26	69	Promotion to Premier League
2	Baltika Kaliningrad (P)	34	18	13	3	56	30	+26	67	Promotion to Premier League
3	Alania Vladikavkaz	34	17	11	6	56	35	+21	62	Failed Russian Premier League licensing (Note: Alania Vladikavkaz failed to receive a 2023–24 Premier League license due to deficiencies with their stadium. Shinnik and Dynamo Makhachkala did not apply for the license.)
4	Yenisey Krasnoyarsk (Q)	34	13	15	6	43	35	+8	54	Qualification to Premier League play-offs
5	Rodina Moscow (Q)	34	13	11	10	42	38	+4	50	Qualification to Premier League play-offs
6	Neftekhimik Nizhnekamsk	34	12	11	11	34	33	+1	47	
7	Shinnik Yaroslavl	34	13	7	14	36	41	−5	46	
8	Dynamo Makhachkala	34	12	10	12	25	29	−4	46	
9	Akron Tolyatti	34	10	16	8	38	36	+2	46	
10	SKA-Khabarovsk	34	11	11	12	50	39	+11	44	
11	KAMAZ Naberezhnye Chelny	34	11	11	12	35	36	−1	44	
12	Volgar Astrakhan	34	11	11	12	37	41	−4	44	
13	Arsenal Tula	34	11	8	15	37	46	−9	41	
14	Kuban Krasnodar	34	9	10	15	36	41	−5	37	
15	Veles Moscow (R)	34	9	6	19	35	55	−20	33	Relegation to Second League
16	Ufa (R)	34	8	8	18	35	46	−11	32	Relegation to Second League
17	Krasnodar-2 (R)	34	8	7	19	32	54	−22	31	Relegation to Second League
18	Volga Ulyanovsk (R)	34	6	12	16	23	41	−18	30	Relegation to Second League

Source: Soccerway
Rules for classification: 1) Points; then in case of a two-way tie: 2) Head-to-head points; 3) Head-to-head matches won; 4) Head-to-head goal difference; 5) Head-to-head goals scored; 6) Head-to-head away goals scored; 7) Matches won; 8) Goal difference; 9) Goals scored; 10) Away goals scored; 11) Drawing lots; in case of a three-or-more-way tie: 2) Matches won; 3) Head-to-head points; 4) Head-to-head matches won; 5) Head-to-head goal difference; 6) Head-to-head goals scored; 7) Head-to-head away goals scored; 8) Goal difference; 9) Goals scored; 10) Away goals scored; 11) Drawing lots.
(C) Champions; (P) Promoted; (Q) Qualified for Promotion Playoffs; (R) Relegated

== Positions by round ==
Team ╲ Round	1	2	3	4	5	6	7	8	9	10	11	12	13	14	15	16	17	18	19	20	21	22	23	24	25	26	27	28	29	30	31	32	33	34
Rubin Kazan	1	8	8	10	4	3	4	5	3	2	4	6	6	4	5	5	4	5	4	3	2	2	2	2	2	2	2	2	2	2	2	1	1	1
Baltika Kaliningrad	13	7	7	6	6	4	2	3	5	3	2	2	2	2	2	2	2	1	1	1	1	1	1	1	1	1	1	1	1	1	1	2	2	2
Alania Vladikavkaz	10	3	5	2	2	2	3	2	1	1	1	1	1	1	1	1	1	2	2	2	3	3	4	4	4	3	3	3	3	3	3	3	3	3
Yenisey Krasnoyarsk	9	5	6	3	8	6	6	8	6	6	7	5	4	6	4	4	3	4	3	4	4	4	3	3	3	4	4	4	4	4	4	4	4	4
Rodina Moscow	16	18	14	13	14	13	15	16	16	16	16	17	17	17	17	16	14	12	12	12	12	12	11	11	13	13	12	11	8	7	6	5	5	5
Neftekhimik Nizhnekamsk	15	15	9	11	12	9	7	4	8	9	10	10	11	8	8	9	9	9	9	10	9	11	12	13	12	12	9	7	6	8	11	12	10	6
Shinnik Yaroslavl	17	10	12	12	13	15	11	13	10	11	11	11	8	9	10	7	10	8	10	9	10	10	9	7	7	7	10	10	11	9	10	8	6	7
Dynamo Makhachkala	11	6	11	7	7	8	5	7	9	5	6	8	9	10	9	11	11	11	11	11	11	9	8	9	10	6	7	6	7	6	5	6	7	8
Akron Tolyatti	14	17	16	17	16	16	18	17	17	17	17	15	15	14	13	13	12	13	13	13	13	13	13	12	11	11	11	13	13	10	12	13	11	9
SKA-Khabarovsk	12	16	18	15	15	14	10	11	11	10	8	9	10	11	11	8	7	6	6	5	5	5	6	8	8	9	8	8	9	11	13	10	13	10
KAMAZ Naberezhnye Chelny	6	2	1	1	1	1	1	1	2	4	5	4	3	3	3	3	6	7	7	7	7	8	10	10	9	10	13	12	12	13	9	11	8	11
Volgar Astrakhan	7	13	3	9	3	5	8	9	7	8	9	7	7	5	7	10	8	10	8	8	8	6	5	6	5	5	5	5	5	5	7	7	9	12
Arsenal Tula	4	1	2	5	5	7	9	6	4	7	3	3	5	7	6	6	5	3	5	6	6	7	7	5	6	8	6	9	10	12	8	9	12	13
Kuban Krasnodar	3	4	10	4	9	11	13	14	15	13	13	12	13	12	12	15	16	16	16	15	16	16	14	14	14	14	14	14	14	14	15	14	14	14
Veles Moscow	5	9	15	16	17	17	16	12	13	15	15	16	16	15	15	14	15	15	15	14	15	14	15	15	15	15	15	15	15	15	14	15	15	15
Ufa	18	12	13	14	10	10	12	15	14	12	12	13	12	13	14	12	13	14	14	16	14	15	16	16	16	16	16	16	16	16	16	16	16	16
Krasnodar-2	2	11	4	8	11	12	14	10	12	14	14	14	14	16	16	17	17	17	18	18	18	18	18	18	18	18	18	18	18	18	18	18	18	17
Volga Ulyanovsk	8	14	17	18	18	18	17	18	18	18	18	18	18	18	18	18	18	18	17	17	17	17	17	17	17	17	17	17	17	17	17	17	17	18

Promotion
Play-offs
Relegation to 2023 Russian Second League

Source: everysport.com

== Results by round ==
Team ╲ Round	1	2	3	4	5	6	7	8	9	10	11	12	13	14	15	16	17	18	19	20	21	22	23	24	25	26	27	28	29	30	31	32	33	34
Akron Tolyatti	L	L	D	L	W	L	L	D	D	D	D	W	D	W	D	D	W	L	D	D	D	W	D	W	W	D	D	L	D	W	L	D	W	W
Alania Vladikavkaz	D	W	D	W	W	W	L	D	W	W	D	W	W	W	W	D	L	L	L	W	D	D	L	D	L	W	D	W	W	D	W	D	W	W
Arsenal Tula	W	W	D	L	D	D	D	W	W	L	W	W	L	L	W	L	W	W	D	L	D	L	L	W	L	L	D	L	L	D	W	L	L	L
Baltika Kaliningrad	L	W	D	W	D	W	W	D	D	W	W	W	D	D	D	D	W	W	W	W	W	W	D	W	D	D	D	W	D	W	W	L	D	W
Dynamo Makhachkala	D	W	L	W	D	D	W	D	D	W	D	L	L	L	W	D	L	W	L	D	D	W	W	L	D	W	L	W	L	W	W	L	L	L
KAMAZ Naberezhnye Chelny	W	W	W	D	W	W	D	D	L	L	D	W	D	W	L	D	L	L	W	D	D	L	D	L	W	L	L	D	D	L	W	L	W	L
Rubin Kazan	W	L	D	D	W	W	D	D	W	W	L	L	W	W	D	D	W	D	W	W	W	W	D	D	D	D	W	W	W	W	W	W	W	D
Krasnodar-2	W	L	W	D	L	L	L	W	L	L	D	L	D	L	L	L	L	L	L	D	D	L	L	W	D	W	L	D	L	L	L	W	W	W
Kuban Krasnodar	W	D	L	W	L	L	L	D	L	W	L	W	D	D	L	L	L	L	L	W	L	D	W	D	W	W	D	D	D	L	L	D	L	W
Neftekhimik Nizhnekamsk	L	D	W	D	L	W	W	W	L	L	D	L	D	W	W	D	D	W	L	L	D	L	D	L	W	D	W	W	D	L	L	D	W	W
Rodina Moscow	L	L	W	D	D	D	L	L	D	L	D	L	L	W	L	W	W	W	D	D	W	W	W	L	L	D	W	D	W	W	W	D	W	D
Shinnik Yaroslavl	L	W	D	L	D	L	W	L	W	D	W	L	W	L	W	W	L	W	L	D	L	D	W	W	L	D	L	L	D	W	L	W	W	L
SKA-Khabarovsk	L	L	L	W	D	D	W	D	D	W	W	D	L	L	W	W	W	W	W	D	L	L	L	D	L	D	D	D	L	D	L	W	L	W
Ufa	L	W	D	L	W	D	L	L	D	W	D	L	W	L	L	D	D	L	L	L	W	L	L	L	W	L	D	L	W	L	D	W	L	L
Volga Ulyanovsk	D	L	L	L	L	L	W	L	L	D	L	D	D	L	D	D	L	L	W	L	D	L	W	D	L	D	D	D	W	L	L	W	L	D
Veles Moscow	W	L	L	L	L	L	W	W	L	L	D	L	L	W	L	W	L	L	D	W	L	W	L	D	D	L	W	L	D	D	W	L	L	L
Volgar Astrakhan	W	L	W	D	W	D	L	D	W	L	D	W	D	W	L	L	W	W	W	D	L	W	D	D	W	D	D	W	D	L	L	L	L	L
Yenisey Krasnoyarsk	D	W	D	W	L	W	D	D	W	D	L	W	W	L	W	D	W	D	W	L	W	D	W	D	D	D	D	L	L	W	D	D	W	D

Source: Soccerstats.com (in English)
W = Win; D = Draw; L = Lose

== Results ==
Home \ Away	AKR	ALA	ARS	BAL	DYN	KAM	KR2	KUB	NEF	ROD	RUB	SHI	SKA	UFA	VEL	ULY	VOL	YEN
Akron Tolyatti		0–0	0–0	1–3	2–0	2–0	0–0	0–0	0–3	2–2	0–0	2–3	1–1	1–1	3–0	4–0	1–0	1–1
Alania Vladikavkaz	3–3		2–1	3–1	0–0	4–2	5–2	1–1	1–0	1–3	0–0	3–1	4–1	2–1	1–0	1–2	2–2	1–1
Arsenal Tula	1–1	0–2		0–5	1–1	0–1	3–1	1–2	2–1	2–3	0–1	0–1	3–2	2–1	1–1	2–0	3–2	2–2
Baltika Kaliningrad	1–1	2–1	1–0		1–1	1–0	2–1	2–0	2–2	0–0	0–1	1–0	2–0	3–2	2–1	2–2	3–1	3–2
Dynamo Makhachkala	1–1	1–2	0–0	0–0		1–0	1–0	2–1	2–0	0–0	0–1	2–1	0–0	0–1	1–0	0–2	1–2	2–0
KAMAZ Naberezhnye Chelny	4–0	1–0	0–1	0–0	1–2		1–1	2–1	0–2	2–0	0–0	1–0	3–2	2–2	0–2	0–0	2–2	1–0
Krasnodar-2	0–1	0–3	0–3	0–3	0–1	2–2		1–1	0–0	1–0	0–1	4–0	1–4	1–0	5–2	0–0	0–2	1–2
Kuban Krasnodar	1–1	1–2	2–1	0–0	0–1	0–1	4–0		0–1	0–1	1–2	2–0	2–2	2–0	3–2	1–0	0–0	0–2
Neftekhimik Nizhnekamsk	0–1	0–0	1–0	0–0	2–1	0–1	3–0	0–0		1–5	2–2	1–0	0–1	2–0	2–0	1–2	1–1	1–1
Rodina Moscow	1–3	1–3	1–1	1–2	1–0	2–2	1–2	2–2	0–2		0–0	2–1	2–0	2–1	1–1	2–1	0–0	0–2
Rubin Kazan	3–2	2–2	1–2	3–3	2–0	1–1	5–2	3–0	2–0	2–0		3–0	3–1	0–0	1–1	1–0	3–2	0–0
Shinnik Yaroslavl	1–0	0–1	2–1	1–1	0–0	1–0	0–2	1–0	3–0	1–1	1–0		1–0	3–0	2–0	2–2	2–1	2–2
SKA-Khabarovsk	3–0	0–0	6–0	2–2	0–1	3–1	0–1	2–0	0–0	2–1	1–2	3–1		1–1	6–0	1–1	2–0	0–0
Ufa	0–0	1–3	0–2	0–2	3–0	1–0	2–1	1–2	0–0	0–1	1–2	1–2	3–0		4–1	2–1	0–0	2–2
Veles Moscow	1–2	1–2	1–0	2–1	0–1	1–1	1–0	3–1	4–1	0–2	1–2	1–1	1–0	0–2		0–0	1–3	2–0
Volga Ulyanovsk	1–2	2–1	0–0	0–2	0–0	0–2	1–0	1–4	0–2	0–1	1–2	1–1	0–0	2–1	0–2		0–3	1–1
Volgar Astrakhan	1–0	0–0	1–2	1–2	2–1	0–0	0–3	1–1	0–1	1–1	0–0	1–0	1–3	1–0	2–1	1–0		2–0
Yenisey Krasnoyarsk	0–0	2–0	1–0	1–1	2–0	2–1	0–0	2–1	2–2	0–1	3–2	2–1	1–1	3–1	2–1	0–0	2–1	

Updated to match(es) played on unknown. Source: First League (in Russian), Soccerway
Legend: Blue = home team win; Yellow = draw; Red = away team win.

== Season statistics ==
=== Top goalscorers ===
Rank	Player	Club	Goals
1	(Bosnia and Herzegovina) Gedeon Guzina	Baltika Kaliningrad	14
1	(Russia) Ivan Timoshenko	Rodina Moscow	14
3	(Russia) Nikolai Giorgobiani	Alania	12
4	(Russia) Nuri Abdokov	Kuban	11
4	(Ghana) Joel Fameyeh	Rubin Kazan	11
6	(Belarus) Vitaly Lisakovich	Rubin Kazan	10
6	(Russia) Tamerlan Musayev	Baltika Kaliningrad	9
6	(Russia) Kirill Panchenko	Arsenal Tula	9
6	(Russia) Nikita Glushkov	Yenisey	9

=== Discipline ===
- Most yellow cards: 97
  - KAMAZ
- Most red cards: 10
  - KAMAZ
