= FC Krasnodar-3 =

FC Krasnodar-M
- Full name: Football Club Krasnodar-M
- Founded: 2014
- Chairman: Sergey Galitsky
- Manager: Dmitri Kudinov
- 2020–21: Russian Professional Football League, Group 1, 12th

FC Krasnodar-M (Russian: «Краснодар-M» (Краснодар)) is a Russian football team from Krasnodar. It is the second farm-club for FC Krasnodar, in addition to FC Krasnodar-2.

== History ==
The club participated in the amateur competitions since its establishment in 2014. After FC Krasnodar-2 was promoted to the Russian Football National League for the 2018–19 season, Krasnodar-3 in turn was licensed for the third-tier Russian Professional Football League. The club decided not to apply for the PFL license for the 2021–22 season, as their roster became extremely close to their team participating in U19 Russian Championship.
