= FC Krasnodar-2 =

- Full name: Футбольный клуб Краснодар-2 (Football Club Krasnodar-2)
- Founded: 2013
- Dissolved: 2025
- Ground: Krasnodar Academy Stadium
- Capacity: 7,011
- Owner: Sergey Galitsky
- Chairman: Sergey Galitsky
- Manager: Ilya Valiyev
- League: None
- 2024–25: Division A, Group Silver, 10th (relegated)
- Website: fckrasnodar.ru/teams/team2/
Home colours	Away colours

FC Krasnodar-2 (Russian: ФК «Краснодар-2» Краснодар) was a Russian football team from Krasnodar, founded in 2013. From 2018–19 to 2022–23 season, it played in the second-tier Russian First League. It was a farm club for the Russian Premier League team FC Krasnodar.

== History ==
In February 2013 the owner of the FC Krasnodar, Sergey Galitsky announced its intention to create a farm club in the summer, and enter it in the Russian Professional Football League. On 27 May 2013 Galitsky confirmed that Krasnodar-2 was officially entered into the second league south zone. On 12 July 2013 Krasnodar-2 played his first official match, losing home to Chernomorets Novorossiysk by 3 to 1.

Before the 2018–19 season, Amkar Perm had their Russian Premier League license recalled due to debts. As a consequence, Anzhi Makhachkala was returned to the Premier League to take Amkar's spot, after the 2018–19 second-tier Russian Football National League calendar was already set. FC Krasnodar-2 received an emergency invitation for a promotion into the FNL and was officially admitted into the league on 26 June 2018 to take Anzhi's spot. Krasnodar-2 was relegated at the end of the 2022–23 season.

Following the relegation to the fourth-tier Russian Second League B at the end of the 2024, the parent club decided to suspend the team for undetermined period.

== League position ==
Season	League									Top goalscorer		Manager
Season	Div.	Pos.	Pl.	W	D	L	GS	GA	P	Name	League	Manager
2013–14	3rd	17th	34	7	6	21	35	66	27	(Russia) Nikolay Komlichenko (Russia) Khasan Akhriyev	6	
2014–15	3rd	7th	14	3	1	10	15	24	10	(Russia) Nikolay Komlichenko	7	
2014–15	3rd	4th	10	5	1	4	19	17	16	(Russia) Dmitri Vorobyov	2	
2015–16	3rd	3rd	26	14	6	6	53	26	48	(Russia) Nikolay Komlichenko	24	

== Notable players ==
Had international caps for their respective countries. Players whose name is listed in bold represented their countries while playing for Krasnodar-2.

Russia

- (Russia) Stanislav Agkatsev
- (Russia) Sergei Borodin
- (Russia) Aleksandr Chernikov
- (Russia) Daniil Fomin
- (Russia) Nikolay Komlichenko
- (Russia) Nikita Krivtsov
- (Russia) Yevgeni Latyshonok
- (Russia) Matvey Safonov
- (Russia) Yegor Sorokin
- (Russia) Daniil Utkin
- (Russia) Sergei Volkov
- (Russia) Dmitry Vorobyov

Europe

- (Armenia) **Georgy Arutyunyan**
- (Armenia) **Eduard Spertsyan**
- (Georgia (country)) **Tornike Okriashvili**
- (Moldova) Valeriu Ciupercă
- (Norway) Stefan Strandberg
- (Romania) Andrei Ivan

Asia

- (Tajikistan) **Alidzhoni Ayni**
