= 2026 Russian Cup final =

Суперфинал Кубка России 2026
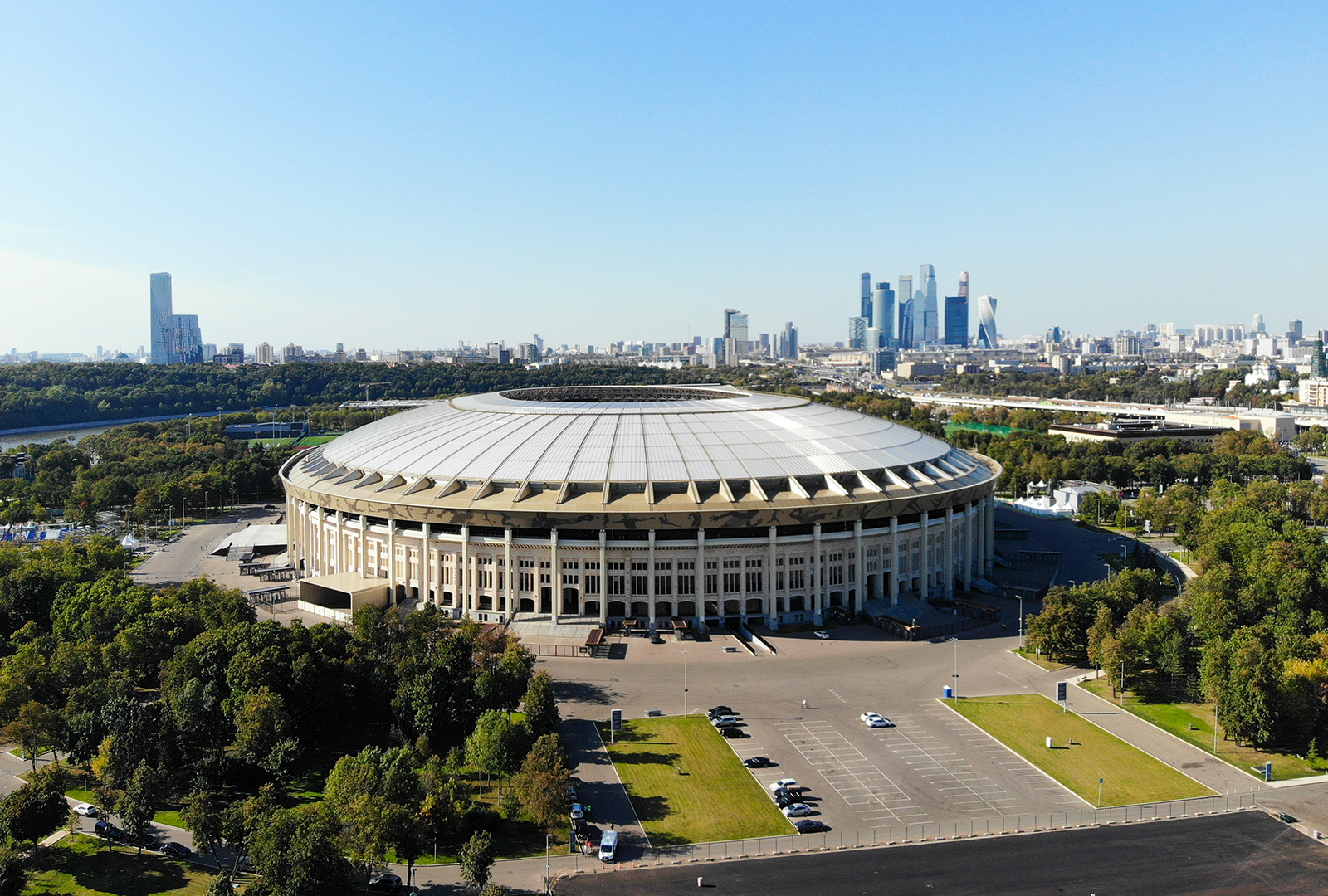
- view of Luzhniki Stadium
- Event: 2025–26 Russian Cup
Spartak Moscow	Krasnodar
1	1
- Spartak Moscow won 4–3 in a penalty shoot-out
- Date: 24 May 2026
- Venue: Luzhniki Stadium, Moscow
- Referee: Inal Tanashev
- Attendance: 72,978

The 2026 Russian Cup final (formally 'Superfinal' due to the competition structure) was the 34th Russian Cup Final, the final match of the 2025–26 Russian Cup. It was played at Luzhniki Stadium in Moscow, Russia, on 24 May 2026, contested by Spartak Moscow and Krasnodar.

Spartak Moscow won the match 4–3 on penalties following a 1–1 draw after regular time. As winners, they earned the right to play against the winners of the 2025–26 Russian Premier League, Zenit Saint Petersburg, in the 2026 Russian Super Cup.

== Club competition history ==
Spartak won the Soviet Cup 10 times and the Russian Cup 4 times previously, in 1938, 1939, 1946, 1947, 1950, 1958, 1963, 1965, 1971, 1992, 1993–94, 1997–98, 2002–03, 2021–22.

Krasnodar has never won the Russian Cup before, reaching the finals twice.

== Path to the final ==
Spartak won Group C in the group stage of the cup. Then they eliminated Lokomotiv Moscow in the RPL path quarterfinal and lost to Dynamo Moscow in the RPL path semi-final. It then (according to the double-elimination competition structure of the cup) transferred into the Regions path, where they eliminated Zenit St. Petersburg in a penalty shoot-out and then CSKA Moscow to reach the final.

Krasnodar won Group B at the group stage, then eliminated Orenburg, CSKA Moscow and Dynamo Moscow (the latter in the penalty shoot-out) to reach the final.

== Match ==
=== Details ===
24 May 2026
18:00 MSK (UTC+3)

Spartak Moscow	1–1	Krasnodar
Solari 37'	Report	Augusto 57'
Penalties
Dmitriyev (penalty scored); Umyarov (penalty scored); Wooh (penalty scored); Barco (penalty scored)	4–3	(penalty scored) Spertsyan; (penalty scored) Olaza; (penalty scored) Krivtsov; (penalty missed) Boselli; (penalty missed) Pina

Luzhniki Stadium, Moscow
Attendance: 72,978
Referee: Inal Tanashev

GK	98	(Russia) Aleksandr Maksimenko		(substituted off) 90+4'
RB	83	(Portugal) Gedson Fernandes
CB	3	(Cameroon) Christopher Wooh
CB	4	(Ghana) Alexander Djiku		(substituted off) 44'
LB	47	(Russia) Roman Zobnin (c)		(substituted off) 90+4'
CM	68	(Russia) Ruslan Litvinov
CM	18	(Russia) Nail Umyarov	(yellow card) 59'
RW	7	(Argentina) Pablo Solari		(substituted off) 64'
AM	5	(Argentina) Esequiel Barco
LW	10	(Brazil) Marquinhos
CF	9	(Costa Rica) Manfred Ugalde		(substituted off) 64'
Substitutes:
GK	1	(Russia) Ilya Pomazun		(substituted on) 90+4'
GK	56	(Russia) Aleksandr Dovbnya
DF	2	(Moldova) Oleg Reabciuk
DF	14	(Russia) Ilya Samoshnikov
DF	27	(Russia) Igor Dmitriyev		(substituted on) 90+4'
DF	97	(Russia) Daniil Denisov	(yellow card) 90+2'	(substituted on) 64'
MF	17	(Russia) Vladislav Saus
MF	24	(Russia) Nikita Massalyga
MF	28	(Russia) Daniil Zorin
MF	35	(Luxembourg) Christopher Martins	(yellow card) 45'	(substituted on) 44'
FW	11	(Trinidad and Tobago) Levi García		(substituted on) 64'
FW	91	(Russia) Anton Zabolotny
Manager:
(Spain) Juan Carlos Carcedo

GK	1	(Russia) Stanislav Agkatsev
RB	20	(Uruguay) Giovanni González		(substituted off) 82'
CB	3	(Brazil) Vítor Tormena	(yellow card) 45+2'
CB	4	(Brazil) Diego Costa	(yellow card) 52'
LB	15	(Uruguay) Lucas Olaza	(yellow card) 45+3'
CM	6	(Cape Verde) Kevin Pina
CM	66	(Brazil) Douglas Augusto	(yellow card) 66'	(substituted off) 72'
RW	11	(Angola) João Batxi	(yellow card) 52'
AM	10	(Armenia) Eduard Spertsyan (c)	(yellow card) 80'
LW	88	(Russia) Nikita Krivtsov
CF	9	(Colombia) Jhon Córdoba		(substituted off) 75'
Substitutes:
GK	16	(Russia) Aleksandr Koryakin
GK	34	(Russia) Andrey Karpenko
DF	2	(Russia) Vitali Stezhko
DF	5	(Brazil) Jubal
DF	17	(Russia) Valentin Paltsev		(substituted on) 82'
DF	59	(Russia) Artyom Khmarin
DF	98	(Russia) Sergei Petrov
FW	7	(Brazil) Victor Sá
FW	23	(Uruguay) Juan Manuel Boselli		(substituted on) 72'
FW	90	(Nigeria) Moses Cobnan		(substituted on) 75'
Manager:
(Russia) Murad Musayev

Assistant referees:
Rustam Mukhtarov (Petrozavodsk)
Adlan Khatuev (Grozny)
Fourth official:
Evgeny Bulanov (Saransk)
Reserve assistant:
Denis Petrov (Astrakhan)
Inspector:
Nikolai Levnikov (Sochi)
VAR:
Artur Fedorov (Petrozavodsk)
AVAR:
Sergey Tsyganok (Kaliningrad)

Match rules

- 90 minutes
- No extra time
- Penalty shoot-out if scores level
- Twelve named substitutes
- Maximum of five substitutions
