= 2024 Russian Super Cup =

| Zenit Saint Petersburg | Krasnodar |
| 4 | 2 |
- Date: 13 July 2024
- Venue: Volgograd Arena, Volgograd
- Man of the Match: Maksim Glushenkov
- Referee: Pavel Kukuyan
- Attendance: 41,984

The 2024 Russian Super Cup (Russian: Суперкубок России по футболу 2024) was the 22nd edition of the Russian Super Cup, an annual football match organised jointly by the Russian Football Union and the Russian Premier League. It was contested by the reigning champions of the Russian Cup and the Russian Premier League, FC Zenit Saint Petersburg and the runners-up of the 2023–24 Premier League, FC Krasnodar. It was played at Volgograd Arena in Volgograd, Russia and Zenit won 4–2, its fifth consecutive title of Russian Super Cup.

== Teams ==
| Team | Qualification | Previous participations (bold indicates winners) |
|---|---|---|
| Zenit Saint Petersburg | Winners of the 2023–24 Russian Premier League and the 2023–24 Russian Cup | 11 (**2008**, **2011**, 2012, 2013, **2015**, **2016**, 2019, **2020**, **2021**, **2022**, **2023**) |
| Krasnodar | Runners-up of the 2023–24 Russian Premier League | 0 |

== Match ==
=== Details ===
13 July 2024
20:30 MSK (UTC+3)

| Zenit Saint Petersburg | 4–2 | Krasnodar |
|---|---|---|
| Rodrigão 13'; Wendel 33'; Glushenkov 42', 68' | Report | Krivtsov 65'; Smolov 70' |

Volgograd Arena, Volgograd
Attendance: 41,984
Referee: Pavel Kukuyan (Sochi)

| GK | 1 | (Russia) Yevgeni Latyshonok |
| DF | 55 | (Brazil) Rodrigão | | (substituted off) 67' |
| DF | 3 | (Brazil) Douglas Santos (c) |
| DF | 25 | (Serbia) Strahinja Eraković |
| DF | 15 | (Russia) Vyacheslav Karavayev | | (substituted off) 75' |
| MF | 67 | (Russia) Maksim Glushenkov |
| MF | 17 | (Russia) Andrei Mostovoy | | (substituted off) 61' |
| MF | 11 | (Brazil) Claudinho | | (substituted off) 61' |
| MF | 5 | (Colombia) Wilmar Barrios |
| MF | 8 | (Brazil) Wendel | | (substituted off) 75' |
| FW | 30 | (Colombia) Mateo Cassierra |
Substitutes:
| GK | 41 | (Russia) Mikhail Kerzhakov |
| GK | 16 | (Russia) Denis Adamov |
| FW | 9 | (Brazil) Artur | | (substituted on) 75' |
| FW | 24 | (Brazil) Pedro | | (substituted on) 75' |
| DF | 82 | (Russia) Sergei Volkov |
| DF | 4 | (Russia) Yuri Gorshkov | | (substituted on) 61' |
| DF | 2 | (Russia) Dmitri Chistyakov |
| DF | 28 | (Kazakhstan) Nuraly Alip | | (substituted on) 67' |
| MF | 31 | (Brazil) Gustavo Mantuan | (yellow card) 86' | (substituted on) 61' |
| MF | 21 | (Russia) Aleksandr Yerokhin |
| FW | 33 | (Russia) Ivan Sergeyev |
| FW | 10 | (France) Wilson Isidor |
Manager:
(Russia) Sergei Semak

| GK | 1 | (Russia) Stanislav Agkatsev |
| DF | 7 | (Brazil) Victor Sá |
| DF | 3 | (Brazil) Vítor Tormena |
| DF | 31 | (Brazil) Kaio |
| MF | 88 | (Russia) Nikita Krivtsov | | (substituted off) 83' |
| MF | 11 | (Angola) João Batxi | | (substituted off) 75' |
| MF | 53 | (Russia) Aleksandr Chernikov |
| MF | 6 | (Cape Verde) Kevin Pina | (yellow card) 39' | (substituted off) 75' |
| MF | 10 | (Armenia) Eduard Spertsyan (c) |
| FW | 40 | (Nigeria) Olakunle Olusegun | | (substituted off) 75' |
| FW | 19 | (Russia) Fyodor Smolov |
Substitutes:
| GK | 13 | (Russia) Yury Dyupin |
| FW | 62 | (Russia) Yevgeny Kovalevsky | | (substituted on) 83' |
| DF | 33 | (Armenia) Georgy Arutyunyan |
| DF | 23 | (Russia) Aleksandr Ektov | | (substituted on) 75' |
| MF | 8 | (Russia) Danila Kozlov | | (substituted on) 75' |
| MF | 18 | (Russia) Yury Gazinsky |
| FW | 90 | (Nigeria) Moses Cobnan | | (substituted on) 75' |
Manager:
(Russia) Murad Musayev

Man of the Match: Maksim Glushenkov.

Assistant referees:
Andrey Obrazko (Stavropol)
Adlan Khatuyev (Grozny)
Fourth official:
Yevgeny Bulanov (Saransk)
Inspector:
Aleksandr Gvardis (Kaliningrad)
VAR:
Vladimir Moskalyov (Voronezh)
AVAR:
Artyom Chistyakov (Azov)

**Match rules**

- 90 minutes
- No extra time
- Penalty shoot-out if scores still level
- Eleven named substitutes
- Maximum of five substitutions
