= 2023 Russian Cup final =

Суперфинал Кубка России 2023
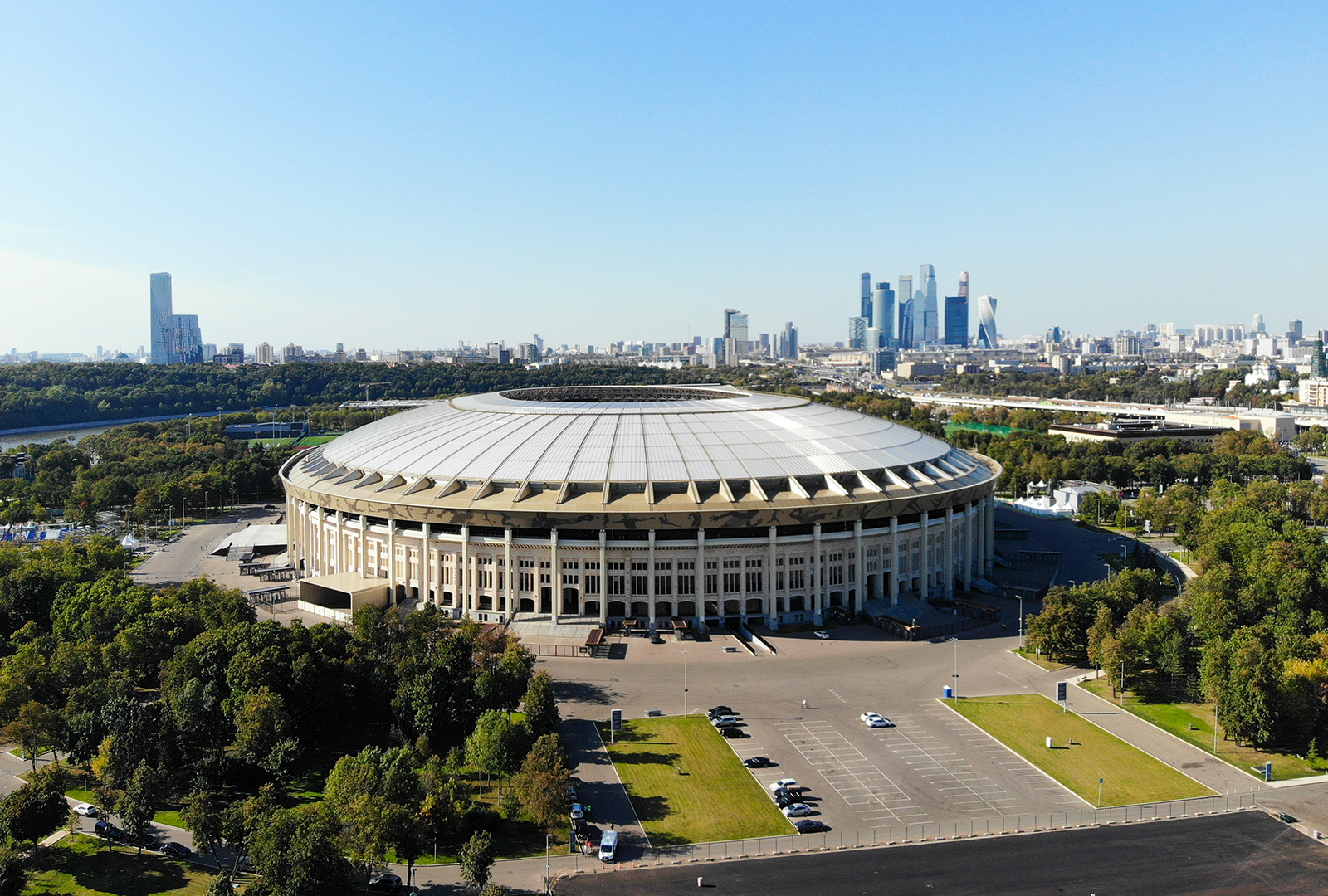
- view of Luzhniki Stadium
- Event: 2022–23 Russian Cup
| CSKA Moscow | Krasnodar |
| 1 | 1 |
- CSKA won 6–5 in a penalty shoot-out
- Date: 11 June 2023
- Venue: Luzhniki Stadium, Moscow
- Man of the Match: Jhon Córdoba
- Referee: Vladislav Bezborodov
- Attendance: 53,425
- Weather: sun

The 2023 Russian Cup final (formally 'Superfinal' due to a new competition structure) was the 31st Russian Cup Final, the final match of the 2022–23 Russian Cup. It was played at Luzhniki Stadium in Moscow, Russia, on 11 June 2023, contested by CSKA Moscow and Krasnodar.

It was the second consecutive Russian Cup Final at Luzhniki Stadium.

== Match ==
The score was opened in the 30th minute by Fyodor Chalov from a penalty kick awarded for a trip of Konstantin Kuchayev by Olakunle Olusegun. Jhon Córdoba equalized early in the second half with a header and the game ended in a 1–1 draw. There is no extra time in the Russian Cup and the game went directly into the penalty shoot-out. Moisés hit the cross-bar with CSKA's third kick before Igor Akinfeev saved Krasnodar's fourth kick by João Batxi and then seventh by Olusegun to win the cup for CSKA.

=== Details ===
11 June 2023
17:00 MSK (UTC+3)

| Krasnodar (1) | 1–1 | CSKA Moscow (1) |
|---|---|---|
| Córdoba 50' | Report | Chalov 32' (pen.) |
Penalties
| Spertsyan (penalty scored); Akhmetov (penalty scored); Córdoba (penalty scored); Batxi (penalty missed); Alonso (penalty scored); Ramírez (penalty scored); Olusegun (penalty missed) | 5–6 | (penalty scored) Chalov; (penalty scored) Diveyev; (penalty missed) Moisés; (penalty scored) Gajić; (penalty scored) Medina; (penalty scored) Carrascal; (penalty scored) Zabolotny |

Luzhniki Stadium, Moscow
Attendance: 53,425
Referee: Vladislav Bezborodov

| Krasnodar | CSKA Moscow |

| GK | 1 | (Russia) Stanislav Agkatsev |
| DF | 4 | (Paraguay) Júnior Alonso |
| DF | 33 | (Armenia) Georgy Arutyunyan |
| DF | 98 | (Russia) Sergei Petrov | (yellow card) 62' | (substituted off) 83' |
| DF | 6 | (Ecuador) Cristian Ramírez |
| MF | 16 | (Cape Verde) Kevin Pina | | (substituted off) 83' |
| MF | 10 | (Armenia) Eduard Spertsyan (c) |
| MF | 19 | (Angola) João Batxi | (yellow card) 58' |
| MF | 11 | (Russia) Aleksei Ionov | | (substituted off) 46' |
| FW | 9 | (Colombia) Jhon Córdoba |
| FW | 40 | (Nigeria) Olakunle Olusegun |
Substitutes:
| GK | 39 | (Russia) Matvei Safonov |
| GK | 97 | (Russia) Nikita Kokarev |
| DF | 28 | (Russia) Grigory Zhilkin |
| DF | 31 | (Brazil) Kaio |
| DF | 41 | (Russia) Mikhail Sukhoruchenko |
| DF | 84 | (Russia) Vyacheslav Litvinov |
| MF | 7 | (Russia) Ilzat Akhmetov | | (substituted in) 46' |
| MF | 14 | (Serbia) Mihajlo Banjac |
| MF | 8 | (Russia) Aleksandr Chernikov | | (substituted in) 83' |
| MF | 20 | (Brazil) Kady Borges |
| DF | 82 | (Russia) Sergei Volkov | | (substituted in) 83' |
| FW | 90 | (Nigeria) Moses Cobnan | (yellow card) 79' |
Manager:
(Serbia) Vladimir Ivić

| GK | 35 | (Russia) Igor Akinfeev (c) |
| DF | 27 | (Brazil) Moisés |
| DF | 4 | (Brazil) Willyan | (yellow card) 76' |
| DF | 78 | (Russia) Igor Diveyev | (yellow card) 90' |
| DF | 14 | (Russia) Kirill Nababkin | | (substituted off) 69' |
| MF | 19 | (Kazakhstan) Bakhtiyar Zaynutdinov | | (substituted off) 74' |
| MF | 10 | (Russia) Ivan Oblyakov | (yellow card) 58' | (substituted off) 63' |
| MF | 5 | (Serbia) Saša Zdjelar | (yellow card) 48' |
| MF | 20 | (Russia) Konstantin Kuchayev | | (substituted off) 46' |
| MF | 28 | (Paraguay) Jesús Medina |
| FW | 9 | (Russia) Fyodor Chalov |
Substitutes:
| GK | 49 | (Russia) Vladislav Torop |
| GK | 75 | (Russia) Vladimir Shaykhutdinov |
| DF | 77 | (Russia) Ilya Agapov |
| DF | 90 | (Russia) Matvey Lukin |
| MF | 88 | (Chile) Víctor Méndez | | (substituted in) 46' |
| DF | 42 | (Russia) Georgi Shchennikov |
| DF | 92 | (Russia) Yegor Noskov |
| MF | 8 | (Colombia) Jorge Carrascal | (yellow card) 86' | (substituted in) 74' |
| DF | 22 | (Serbia) Milan Gajić | | (substituted in) 69' |
| MF | 6 | (Russia) Maksim Mukhin |
| FW | 53 | (Russia) Kirill Glebov |
| FW | 91 | (Russia) Anton Zabolotny | | (substituted in) 63' |
Manager:
(Russia) Vladimir Fedotov

Man of the Match: Jhon Córdoba

Assistant referees:
Maksim Gavrilin (Vladimir)
Valery Danchenko (Ufa)
Fourth official:
Kirill Levnikov (St. Petersburg)
Reserve assistant:
Maksim Kovalyov (Reutov)
Inspector:
Gennady Kulichenkov (Tula)
VAR:
Pavel Kukuyan (Sochi)
AVAR:
Aleksey Lunyov (Novosibirsk)
Commissary:
Ivan Tsitovich (Moscow)

Match rules

- 90 minutes
- No extra time
- Penalty shoot-out if scores level
- Twelve named substitutes
- Maximum of five substitutions
