= 2024–25 FC Krasnodar season =

FC Krasnodar
2024–25 season
- Manager: Murad Musayev
- Stadium: Krasnodar Stadium
- Premier League: 1st (champions)
- Russian Cup: Regions path Quarter-finals Stage 2
- Super Cup: Runners-up
- Top goalscorer: League: Jhon Córdoba (12); All: Jhon Córdoba (13)
- Highest home attendance: 36,664 vs Dynamo Moscow (24 May 2025)
- Lowest home attendance: 17,377 vs Akhmat Grozny (15 August 2024)
- Average home league attendance: 27,561 (24 May 2025)

The 2024–25 season was FC Krasnodar's 17th season in existence and 13th consecutive in the Russian Premier League. In addition to the domestic league, where they won their first title, they participated in the Russian Cup before defeat to Akhmat Grozny in the Regions path Quarter-finals Stage 2, and were Runners Up to Zenit St.Petersburg in the Super Cup.

== Season events ==
On 15 June, Krasnodar announced the signing of free-agent Yury Dyupin on a contract until the end of June 2025.

On 18 June, Krasnodar announced the return of free-agent Fyodor Smolov on a contract until the end of June 2025.

On 27 June, Krasnodar announced the signing of Danila Kozlov from Baltika Kaliningrad on a contract until the end of June 2029.

On 10 July, Krasnodar announced the return of free-agent Yury Gazinsky on a contract until the end of June 2025.

On 12 July, Krasnodar announced the signing of Timur Abdrashitov from Kaluga on a contract until the end of June 2027.

On 17 July, Krasnodar announced the signing of Diego Costa from São Paulo on a contract until the end of June 2029.

On 17 August, Krasnodar announced the signing of Giovanni González from RCD Mallorca on a contract until the end of June 2027.

On 19 August, Krasnodar extended their contract with Moses Cobnan until 30 June 2028.

On 5 November, Krasnodar extended their contract with Jhon Córdoba until 30 June 2027.

On 25 January, Krasnodar announced that Georgy Arutyunyan had left the club to sign for Puskás Akadémia.

== Squad ==
As of match played 24 May 2025

Number	Name	Nationality	Position	Date of birth (age)	Signed from	Signed in	Contract ends	Apps.	Goals
Goalkeepers
1	Stanislav Agkatsev	(Russia)	GK	9 January 2002 (aged 23)	Academy	2018		58	0
13	Yury Dyupin	(Russia)	GK	17 March 1988 (aged 37)	Unattached	2024	2025	5	0
Defenders
3	Vítor Tormena	(Brazil)	DF	1 January 1996 (aged 29)	Braga	2023	2027	54	2
4	Diego Costa	(Brazil)	DF	21 July 1999 (aged 25)	São Paulo	2024	2029	32	1
15	Lucas Olaza	(Uruguay)	DF	21 July 1994 (aged 30)	Real Valladolid	2023	2025 (+1)	62	2
20	Giovanni González	(Uruguay)	DF	20 September 1994 (aged 30)	RCD Mallorca	2024	2027	27	0
31	Kaio	(Brazil)	DF	18 September 1995 (aged 29)	Santa Clara	2019		123	4
40	Olakunle Olusegun	(Nigeria)	DF	23 April 2002 (aged 23)	Botev Plovdiv	2022	2028	101	12
98	Sergei Petrov	(Russia)	DF	2 January 1991 (aged 34)	Krylia Sovetov	2013	2025	323	15
Midfielders
6	Kevin Pina	(Cape Verde)	MF	27 January 1997 (aged 28)	Chaves	2022	2025	78	5
8	Danila Kozlov	(Russia)	MF	19 January 2005 (aged 20)	Baltika Kaliningrad	2024	2029	32	4
10	Eduard Spertsyan	(Armenia)	MF	7 June 2000 (aged 24)	Academy	2018		143	44
18	Yury Gazinsky	(Russia)	MF	20 July 1989 (aged 35)	Unattached	2024	2025	289	15
53	Alexander Chernikov	(Russia)	MF	1 February 2000 (aged 25)	Academy	2019		121	6
59	Artyom Khmarin	(Russia)	MF	3 May 2007 (aged 18)	Academy	2024		2	0
88	Nikita Krivtsov	(Russia)	MF	18 August 2002 (aged 22)	Torpedo Vladimir	2021		119	17
Forwards
7	Victor Sá	(Brazil)	FW	27 March 1994 (aged 31)	Botafogo	2024	2025	42	4
9	Jhon Córdoba	(Colombia)	FW	11 May 1993 (aged 32)	Hertha BSC	2021	2027	115	58
11	João Batxi	(Angola)	FW	1 May 1998 (aged 27)	Chaves	2022	2027	92	9
19	Fyodor Smolov	(Russia)	FW	9 February 1990 (aged 35)	Unattached	2024	2025	125	68
90	Moses Cobnan	(Nigeria)	FW	10 September 2002 (aged 22)	Železiarne Podbrezová	2023	2028	66	7
Away on loan
35	Roman Safronov	(Russia)	GK	15 February 2003 (aged 22)	Academy	2020		0	0
62	Yevgeny Kovalevsky	(Russia)	FW	24 November 2005 (aged 19)	Academy	2024		2	0
94	Dmitry Kuchugura	(Russia)	FW	21 October 2004 (aged 20)	Academy	2024		1	0
96	Aleksandr Koksharov	(Russia)	FW	20 December 2004 (aged 20)	Academy	2022		20	4
	Mikhail Shtepa	(Russia)	GK	19 March 2003 (aged 22)	Academy	2021		0	0
	Aleksandr Ektov	(Russia)	DF	30 January 1996 (aged 29)	Orenburg	2023	2026	21	0
	Dmitri Pivovarov	(Russia)	DF	21 March 2000 (aged 25)	Academy	2021		5	0
	Mikhail Sukhoruchenko	(Russia)	DF	13 April 2003 (aged 22)	Academy	2021		2	0
	Grigory Zhilkin	(Russia)	DF	20 June 2003 (aged 21)	Academy	2021		1	0
	Ifeanyi David Nduka	(Nigeria)	MF	2 December 2003 (aged 21)	Botev Plovdiv	2022	2026	1	0
	Mihajlo Banjac	(Serbia)	MF	10 November 1999 (aged 25)	TSC	2022	2026	65	3
	Ruslan Chobanov	(Russia)	MF	30 March 2004 (aged 21)	Academy	2023		0	0
	David Kokoyev	(Russia)	MF	29 August 2002 (aged 22)	Academy	2021		2	0
	Nikita Plotnikov	(Russia)	MF	23 June 2003 (aged 21)	Academy	2022		0	0
	Danil Karpov	(Russia)	FW	28 June 1999 (aged 25)	Tyumen	2022	2025	2	0
	Aleksandr Yegurnev	(Russia)	FW	7 January 2002 (aged 23)	Kaluga	2023	2026	0	0
Players who left during the season
5	Kevin Castaño	(Colombia)	MF	29 September 2000 (aged 24)	Cruz Azul	2024	2028	32	1
33	Georgy Arutyunyan	(Armenia)	DF	9 August 2004 (aged 20)	Academy	2023		20	1

== Transfers ==
=== In ===
Date	Position	Nationality	Name	From	Fee	Ref.
15 June 2024	GK	(Russia)	Yury Dyupin	Unattached	Free	
18 June 2024	FW	(Russia)	Fyodor Smolov	Unattached	Free	
27 June 2024	MF	(Russia)	Danila Kozlov	Baltika Kaliningrad	Undisclosed	
10 July 2024	MF	(Russia)	Yury Gazinsky	Unattached	Free	
12 July 2024	FW	(Russia)	Timur Abdrashitov	Kaluga	Undisclosed	
17 July 2024	DF	(Brazil)	Diego Costa	São Paulo	Undisclosed	
17 August 2024	DF	(Uruguay)	Giovanni González	RCD Mallorca	Undisclosed	

=== Out ===
Date	Position	Nationality	Name	To	Fee	Ref.
14 June 2024	GK	(Russia)	Matvei Safonov	Paris Saint-Germain	Undisclosed	
24 June 2024	DF	(Russia)	Sergei Volkov	Zenit St.Petersburg	Undisclosed	
27 June 2024	DF	(Russia)	Ivan Churikov	Sokol Saratov	Undisclosed	
3 July 2024	FW	(Russia)	Magomed-Shapi Suleymanov	Aris Thessaloniki	Undisclosed	
6 July 2024	FW	(Russia)	Rustam Khalnazarov	Lokomotiv Tashkent	Undisclosed	
8 July 2024	MF	(Brazil)	Kady Borges	Ferencváros	Undisclosed	
10 July 2024	DF	(Paraguay)	Júnior Alonso	Atlético Mineiro	Undisclosed	
11 July 2024	DF	(Russia)	Nikita Semenenko	Sibir Novosibirsk	Undisclosed	
12 July 2024	FW	(Nigeria)	Jonathan Okoronkwo	Hatayspor	Undisclosed	
25 January 2025	DF	(Armenia)	Georgy Arutyunyan	Puskás Akadémia	Undisclosed	
12 March 2025	MF	(Colombia)	Kevin Castaño	River Plate	Undisclosed	

=== Loans out ===
Date from	Position	Nationality	Name	To	Date to	Ref.
25 June 2024	DF	(Russia)	Mikhail Sukhoruchenko	Tyumen	End of season	
27 June 2024	MF	(Russia)	Ruslan Chobanov	Sokol Saratov	End of season	
28 June 2024	GK	(Russia)	Mikhail Shtepa	Chayka Peschanokopskoye	End of season	
2 July 2024	MF	(Russia)	David Kokoyev	Alania Vladikavkaz	End of season	
3 July 2024	MF	(Serbia)	Mihajlo Banjac	TSC	End of season	
4 July 2024	FW	(Russia)	Aleksandr Yegurnev	Spartak Kostroma	End of season	
8 July 2024	DF	(Russia)	Grigory Zhilkin	Arsenal Tula	End of season	
9 July 2024	MF	(Russia)	Nikita Plotnikov	Rotor Volgograd	End of season	
30 July 2024	FW	(Russia)	Danil Karpov	Tyumen	End of season	
7 August 2024	DF	(Russia)	Aleksandr Ektov	Pari Nizhny Novgorod	End of season	
9 December 2024	MF	(Russia)	Mikhail Umnikov	Volga Ulyanovsk	End of season	
19 December 2024	FW	(Russia)	Aleksandr Koksharov	Pari Nizhny Novgorod	End of season	
23 December 2024	FW	(Russia)	Dmitry Kuchugura	Ural Yekaterinburg	End of season	

=== Released ===
Date	Position	Nationality	Name	Joined	Date	Ref.
20 June 2024	FW	(Russia)	Kamil Mullin	Ufa	9 July 2024	
27 May 2025	GK	(Russia)	Yury Dyupin			
27 May 2025	MF	(Russia)	Yury Gazinsky			
27 May 2025	FW	(Russia)	Fyodor Smolov			

== Friendlies ==
23 June 2024	Krasnodar	1–0	Kuban Krasnodar
19:00 MSK (UTC+3)	Dorofeev 51'		Vedeneev (yellow card) 16'

29 June 2024	Krasnodar	2–0	Dynamo Makhachkala
19:00 MSK (UTC+3)	Krivtsov 8'; Smolov 15'

6 July 2024	Krasnodar	3–2	Rostov
19:30 MSK (UTC+3)	Smolov 59'; Spertsyan 65'; Okoronkwo 82'		Zubenko 13'; Komlichenko 78', (red card) 90+3'

25 January 2025	Krasnodar	1–1	Chengdu Rongcheng	Abu Dhabi, United Arab Emirates
15:30 MSK (UTC+3)	Pina 26'	Report	Felipe 19'	Stadium: Abu Dhabi Sports Complex; Referee: Nikola Djordjevic

30 January 2025	Spartak Moscow	3–2	Krasnodar	Abu Dhabi, United Arab Emirates
19:30 MSK (UTC+3)	Bongonda 20'; Zobnin 70', 90+2'	Report	Batxi 22'; Krivtsov 54'	Stadium: Al Nahyan Stadium; Referee: Evgeny Kukulyak

4 February 2025	Krasnodar	1–0	Dynamo Moscow	Abu Dhabi, United Arab Emirates
15:00 MSK (UTC+3)	Tormena (red card) 55'; Córdoba (yellow card) 53' (goal) 59'; Kozlov (yellow card) 67'	Report	Marichal (yellow card) 52'; Lunyov (yellow card) 55'; Okishor (yellow card) 64'	Stadium: Al Nahyan Stadium; Referee: Sergei Ivanov

10 February 2025	CSKA Moscow	1–2	Krasnodar	Abu Dhabi, United Arab Emirates
19:30 MSK (UTC+3)	Zhemaletdinov 67'	Report	Córdoba (yellow card) 6' (goal) 51', 70'; Gazinsky (yellow card) 86'	Stadium: Al Nahyan Stadium; Referee: Artem Chistyakov

== Competitions ==
=== Overall record ===
Competition	First match	Last match	Starting round	Final position	Record							
Competition	First match	Last match	Starting round	Final position	Pld	W	D	L	GF	GA	GD	Win %
Premier League	21 July 2024	24 May 2025	Matchday 1	Winners	30	20	7	3	59	23	+36	66.67
Russian Cup	31 July 2024	11 March 2025	Group stage	Regions path Quarter-finals Stage 2	8	3	1	4	8	12	−4	37.50
Super Cup	13 July 2024		Final	Runner-up	1	0	0	1	2	4	−2	0.00
Total					39	23	8	8	69	39	+30	58.97

Last updated: 24 May 2025
Source: Soccerway

=== Super Cup ===
13 July 2024	Zenit St.Petersburg	4–2	Krasnodar	Volgograd
20:30 MSK (UTC+3)	Rodrigão 13'; Wendel 33'; Glushenkov 42', 68'; Mantuan (yellow card) 86'	Report	Pina (yellow card) 39'; Krivtsov 65'; Smolov 70'	Stadium: Volgograd Arena; Attendance: 41,084; Referee: Pavel Kukuian

=== Premier League ===
==== League table ====
Pos	Team	Pld	W	D	L	GF	GA	GD	Pts
1	Krasnodar (C)	30	20	7	3	59	23	+36	67
2	Zenit Saint Petersburg	30	20	6	4	58	18	+40	66
3	CSKA Moscow	30	17	8	5	47	21	+26	59
4	Spartak Moscow	30	17	6	7	56	25	+31	57
5	Dynamo Moscow	30	16	8	6	61	35	+26	56

Source: Premier Liga
Rules for classification: 1) Points; 2) Head-to-head points; 3) Head-to-head matches won; 4) Head-to-head goal difference; 5) Head-to-head goals scored; 6) Matches won; 7) Goal difference; 8) Goals scored; 9) 2023–24 position (not applicable to final standings); 10) Play-off. Note: if teams tied on points did not play an equal number of head-to-head games, head-to-head results are not considered for the standings.
(C) Champions

==== Results summary ====
Overall								Home						Away					
Pld	W	D	L	GF	GA	GD	Pts	W	D	L	GF	GA	GD	W	D	L	GF	GA	GD
30	20	7	3	59	23	+36	67	11	3	1	31	8	+23	9	4	2	28	15	+13

Last updated: 24 May 2025.

==== Results by round ====
Round	1	2	3	4	5	6	7	8	9	10	11	12	13	14	15	16	17	18	19	20	21	22	23	24	25	26	27	28	29	30
Ground	A	H	A	H	H	A	A	H	A	H	H	A	A	H	A	A	H	H	H	A	A	H	H	A	H	A	H	A	A	H
Result	D	D	D	W	W	W	W	W	W	W	W	W	W	W	D	D	L	D	D	W	W	W	W	L	W	W	W	L	W	W
Position	6	10	12	7	5	3	2	2	2	1	1	1	1	1	1	2	2	1	1	1	1	1	1	1	1	1	1	1	1	1

Updated to match(es) played on 24 May 2025. Source:
A = Away; H = Home; W = Win; D = Draw; L = Loss
Notes:
- ^{1}

==== Matches ====
The match schedule was released on 20 June 2024.

21 July 2024 1	Akhmat Grozny	1–1	Krasnodar	Grozny
20:00 MSK (UTC+3)	Kamilov 43'; Ghandri (yellow card) 84'	Report	Sá (yellow card) 8'; Kozlov (yellow card) 13'; Krivtsov 30'; Kaio (yellow card) 49'	Stadium: Akhmat-Arena; Attendance: 5,397; Referee: Vitali Meshkov

28 July 2024 2	Krasnodar	0–0	Dynamo Makhachkala	Krasnodar
20:00 MSK (UTC+3)	Costa (yellow card) 50'; Sá (yellow card) 72'	Report	Sundukov (yellow card) 66'; Angban (yellow card) 83'; Volk (yellow card) 90+'	Stadium: Krasnodar Stadium; Attendance: 17,385; Referee: Pavel Shadykhanov

4 August 2024 3	Fakel Voronezh	0–0	Krasnodar	Voronezh
17:30 MSK (UTC+3)	Brahimi (yellow card) 25'; Masternoy (yellow card) 27'	Report	Castaño (yellow card) 24'; Spertsyan (yellow card) 41'	Stadium: Fakel Stadium; Attendance: 9,151; Referee: Aleksey Sukhoi

10 August 2024 4	Krasnodar	2–1	CSKA Moscow	Krasnodar
20:00 MSK (UTC+3)	Pina (yellow card) 8'; João Batxi 45+'; Tormena 90+'	Report	Zdjelar (yellow card) 62'; Diveyev 68'	Stadium: Krasnodar Stadium; Attendance: 27,496; Referee: Vladimir Moskalyov

18 August 2024 5	Krasnodar	2–1	Pari NN	Krasnodar
20:00 MSK (UTC+3)	João Batxi (yellow card) 53'; Cobnan 76', 80'	Report	Boselli 36'; Kalinsky (yellow card) 85'	Stadium: Krasnodar Stadium; Attendance: 17,487; Referee: Artem Chistyakov

25 August 2024 6	Dynamo Moscow	0–1	Krasnodar	Moscow
17:30 MSK (UTC+3)		Report	Sá 25'; Costa (yellow card) 56'; Olaza (yellow card) 57'; González (yellow card) 65'; Olusegun (yellow card) 66'	Stadium: VTB Arena; Attendance: 18,079; Referee: Sergei Karasev

1 September 2024 7	Lokomotiv Moscow	0–3	Krasnodar	Moscow
19:45 MSK (UTC+3)	Tiknizyan (yellow card) 3'; Samoshnikov (yellow card) 37'; Lantratov (yellow card) 45+1'; Sarveli (yellow card) 90+1'	Report	Sá 5'; Spertsyan 45+3' (pen.); Córdoba 64' (yellow card) 78' (yellow-red card) 87'; Olaza (yellow card) 84'	Stadium: RZD Arena; Attendance: 13,324; Referee: Vladislav Bezborodov

14 September 2024 8	Krasnodar	2–0	Rostov	Krasnodar
19:00 MSK (UTC+3)	Spertsyan 16', 76'; González (yellow card) 87'	Report	Saravia (yellow card) 44'; Langovich (yellow card) 70'; Sutormin (yellow card) 72'; Shchetinin (yellow card) 75'	Stadium: Krasnodar Stadium; Attendance: 32,316; Referee: Vasily Kazartsev

21 September 2024 9	Akron Tolyatti	2–5	Krasnodar	Samara
14:00 MSK (UTC+3)	Đurasović (yellow card) 22'; Kuzmin (yellow card) 37'; Lončar 54'; Khubulov 86'	Report	Córdoba 27', 76'; Spertsyan 29', 59'; Sá (yellow card) 42'; Krivtsov 88'	Stadium: Solidarnost Samara Arena; Attendance: 4,956; Referee: Vitali Meshkov

28 September 2024 10	Krasnodar	2–0	Zenit St.Petersburg	Krasnodar
19:30 MSK (UTC+3)	Tormena (yellow card) 14'; Chernikov (yellow card) 43'; Córdoba 88'; Smolov 90+4'	Report	Mantuan (yellow card) 23'; Claudinho (yellow card) 27'; Nino (yellow card) 62'	Stadium: Krasnodar Stadium; Attendance: 34,538; Referee: Aleksey Sukhoy

6 October 2024 11	Krasnodar	4–0	Khimki	Krasnodar
19:00 MSK (UTC+3)	Chernikov (yellow card) 35'; Córdoba 41', 73'; João Batxi 56'; Castaño 89'	Report	Fariña (yellow card) 8'; Filin (yellow card) 37'	Stadium: Krasnodar Stadium; Attendance: 22,048; Referee: Sergey Tsyganok

19 October 2024 12	Spartak Moscow	0–3	Krasnodar	Moscow
16:30 MSK (UTC+3)	Umyarov (yellow card) 34'; Litvinov (yellow card) 68'	Report	Pina 8' (yellow card) 10'; Sá 45'; Medina 90+' (o.g.)	Stadium: Lukoil Arena; Attendance: 25,422; Referee: Kirill Levnikov

28 October 2024 13	Krylia Sovetov	1–2	Krasnodar	Samara
18:30 MSK (UTC+3)	Garré (yellow card) 72'; Galdames 89'	Report	Córdoba 42'; Costa 49'; João Batxi (yellow card) 82'	Stadium: Solidarnost Samara Arena; Attendance: 5,610; Referee: Sergey Cheban

3 November 2024 14	Krasnodar	4–0	Orenburg	Krasnodar
19:45 MSK (UTC+3)	Costa (yellow card) 10'; Pina 38'; Chernikov (yellow card) 50'; Kozlov 73'; Spertsyan 79'; Córdoba 88'	Report		Stadium: Krasnodar Stadium; Attendance: 23,652; Referee: Ivan Abrosimov

10 November 2024 15	Rubin Kazan	1–1	Krasnodar	Kazan
19:45 MSK (UTC+3)	Čumić 18'; Daku (penalty missed) 31'; Nizhegorodov (yellow card) 35'; Rozhkov (yellow card) 45+'; Vujačić (yellow card) 75'	Report	Tormena (yellow card) 30'; Chernikov (yellow card) 50' (goal) 53'; Spertsyan (yellow card) 90'	Stadium: Ak Bars Arena; Attendance: 7,923; Referee: Sergei Karasev

23 November 2024 16	Khimki	2–2	Krasnodar	Khimki
16:30 MSK (UTC+3)	Mirzov (yellow card) 44'; Mejía (yellow card) 75'; Rudenko 84'; Vera 90+'	Report	Petrov (yellow card) 44'; João Batxi 46'; Gazinsky 86'; Smolov (yellow card) 88'	Stadium: Arena Khimki; Attendance: 1,987; Referee: Aleksey Sukhoi

1 December 2024 17	Krasnodar	0–3	Spartak Moscow	Krasnodar
19:30 MSK (UTC+3)	Chernikov (yellow card) 19'; Petrov (yellow card) 40'; Córdoba (yellow card) 68'; Tormena (yellow card) 71'	Report	Ugalde 17', 28' (yellow card) 62'; Marquinhos (yellow card) 26'; Babić (yellow card) 82'; Barco 90+' (yellow card) 90+'	Stadium: Krasnodar Stadium; Attendance: 33,146; Referee: Artem Chistyakov

8 December 2024 18	Krasnodar	0–0	Lokomotiv Moscow	Krasnodar
19:30 MSK (UTC+3)	Pina (yellow card) 10'; Petrov (yellow card) 45'; Córdoba (yellow card) 56'	Report	Morozov (yellow card) 19'; Barinov (yellow card) 25'; Pinyayev (yellow card) 80'; Nyamsi (yellow card) 81'	Stadium: Krasnodar Stadium; Attendance: 32,914; Referee: Vasily Kazartsev

1 March 2025 19	Krasnodar	1–1	Krylia Sovetov	Krasnodar
19:30 MSK (UTC+3)	Bijl 48' (o.g.); Costa (yellow card) 89'	Report	Oleynikov 41'	Stadium: Krasnodar Stadium; Attendance: 21,735; Referee: Rafael Shafeev

7 March 2025 20	Pari NN	0–3	Krasnodar	Nizhny Novgorod
18:00 MSK (UTC+3)	Kalinsky (penalty missed) 90+'	Report	Sá (yellow card) 1'; Chernikov 9'; João Batxi 36'; Córdoba 75' (yellow card) 80'; Kozlov (yellow card) 79'	Stadium: Nizhny Novgorod Stadium; Attendance: 10,134; Referee: Vladimir Moskalyov

16 March 2025 21	Rostov	0–1	Krasnodar	Rostov-on-Don
17:00 MSK (UTC+3)	Sutormin (yellow card) 57'; Osipenko (yellow card) 73'; Sako (yellow card) 90+1'; Melyokhin (yellow card) 90+2'	Report	Chernikov (yellow card) 52'; Cobnan (yellow card) 74' (goal) 78'; Córdoba (yellow card) 87'; Agkatsev (yellow card) 90+7'	Stadium: Rostov Arena; Attendance: 22,123; Referee: Pavel Kukuyan

30 March 2025 22	Krasnodar	5–0	Fakel Voronezh	Krasnodar
14:00 MSK (UTC+3)	Olaza (yellow card) 45+'; Cobnan (yellow card) 48'; Krivtsov 53'; Pina (yellow card) 59'; Spertsyan 66'; Olusegun 69', 74'; Kozlov 80'	Report	Brahimi (yellow card) 22'	Stadium: Krasnodar Stadium; Attendance: 27,325; Referee: Sergei Karasev

5 April 2025 23	Krasnodar	1–0	Akron Tolyatti	Krasnodar
19:45 MSK (UTC+3)	Kaio 50'; Chernikov (yellow card) 70'	Report	Escoval (yellow card) 5'; Bardybakhin (yellow card) 56'; Đurasović (yellow card) 64'	Stadium: Krasnodar Stadium; Attendance: 25,669; Referee: Vitali Meshkov

13 April 2025 24	Zenit St.Petersburg	4–1	Krasnodar	Saint Petersburg
17:00 MSK (UTC+3)	Mostovoy 29' (yellow card) 73'; Gondou 38'; Mantuan (yellow card) 73'; Henrique (yellow card) 76' (goal) 90'; Glushenkov 80'	Report	Krivtsov 16'; Chernikov (yellow card) 53'; Olaza (yellow card) 71'; Pina (yellow card) 88'	Stadium: Krestovsky Stadium; Attendance: 57,101; Referee: Pavel Kukuyan

19 April 2025 25	Krasnodar	3–1	Akhmat Grozny	Krasnodar
19:30 MSK (UTC+3)	Batxi (yellow card) 36'; Córdoba 40'; Krivtsov (yellow card) 63'; Spertsyan 78' (pen.); Pina 80' González (yellow card) 84'	Report	Melkadze 52'; Todorović (yellow card) 64'	Stadium: Krasnodar Stadium; Attendance: 26,999; Referee: Vladimir Moskalyov

25 April 2025 26	Dynamo Makhachkala	2–3	Krasnodar	Kaspiysk
19:30 MSK (UTC+3)	Hosseinnejad 25'; Glushkov (yellow card) 62'; Zinovich 86'; Tabidze (yellow card) 88'; Agalarov (penalty missed) 90+'	Report	Cobnan 6'; Petrov (yellow card) 13'; Costa (yellow card) 34' (yellow-red card) 79'; Córdoba (yellow card) 39'; Batxi 45'; Spertsyan 65' (penalty missed) 79'; Agkatsev (yellow card) 79'	Stadium: Anzhi Arena; Attendance: 9,548; Referee: Artem Chistyakov

3 May 2025 27	Krasnodar	2–1	Rubin Kazan	Krasnodar
19:30 MSK (UTC+3)	Spertsyan 5' (pen.); Chernikov (yellow card) 6'; Tormena (yellow card) 14' (goal) 40'; Pina (yellow card) 90+'; Córdoba (yellow card) 90+'	Report	Daku (yellow card) 7'; Rozhkov 83'	Stadium: Krasnodar Stadium; Attendance: 34,037; Referee: Kirill Levnikov

10 May 2025 28	CSKA Moscow	1–0	Krasnodar	Moscow
19:30 MSK (UTC+3)	Guarirapa 69'	Report	Kaio (yellow card) FT	Stadium: VEB Arena; Attendance: 21,393; Referee: Sergei Karasev

17 May 2025 29	Orenburg	1–2	Krasnodar	Orenburg
14:00 MSK (UTC+3)	Mansilla 7'; Tatayev (yellow card) 9'; Zotov (yellow card) 45+'; Khotulyov (yellow card) 57'; Prokhin (yellow card) 80'; Sysuyev (yellow card) 85'; Karataş (yellow card) FT	Report	Córdoba 29' (yellow card) 85'; Olaza 51'; Cobnan (yellow card) 90+'; Kozlov (yellow card) 90+'	Stadium: Gazovik Stadium; Attendance: 5,674; Referee: Vasily Kazartsev

24 May 2025 30	Krasnodar	3–0	Dynamo Moscow	Krasnodar
16:30 MSK (UTC+3)	Córdoba 46'; González (yellow card) 68'; Krivtsov 82' (yellow card) 83'; Spertsyan 90+'	Report		Stadium: Krasnodar Stadium; Attendance: 36,664; Referee: Artem Chistyakov

=== Russian Cup ===
==== Group stage ====
Pos	Team	Pld	W	PW	PL	L	GF	GA	GD	Pts	Qualification
1	CSKA Moscow	6	4	1	0	1	8	2	+6	14	Qualification to the Knockout phase (RPL path)
2	Akhmat Grozny	6	3	0	0	3	9	6	+3	9 (Note: Goal difference in head-to-head games: Akhmat +2, Krasnodar -2 (3-0, 0-1))	Qualification to the Knockout phase (RPL path)
3	Krasnodar	6	3	0	0	3	4	7	−3	9	Qualification to the Knockout phase (regions path)
4	Pari Nizhny Novgorod	6	1	0	1	4	5	11	−6	4	

Source: Russian Football Union (in Russian), Soccerway
Rules for classification: 1) Points; 2) Head-to-head points; 3) Head-to-head matches won; 4) Head-to-head goal difference; 5) Head-to-head goals scored; 6) Matches won; 7) Goal difference; 8) Goals scored; 9) Penalty shoot-out goal difference; 10) Draw.
Notes:

31 July 2024 1	Krasnodar	1–0	CSKA Moscow	Krasnodar
21:00 MSK (UTC+3)	Pina 52'; João Batxi (yellow card) 55'; Olaza (yellow card) 90+2'	Report	Moisés (yellow card) 17'; Bistrović (yellow card) 30'; Willyan (yellow card) 38'	Stadium: Krasnodar Stadium; Attendance: 23,155; Referee: Artem Lyubimov

15 August 2024 2	Krasnodar	1–0	Akhmat Grozny	Krasnodar
20:30 MSK (UTC+3)	Olusegun (yellow card) 11'; Castaño (yellow card) 72'; Chernikov (yellow card) 78'; Zhirov 87' (o.g.); João Batxi (yellow card) 90+6'	Report	Cardoso (yellow card) 52'; Šatara (yellow card) 90+5'	Stadium: Krasnodar Stadium; Attendance: 17,377; Referee: Vasily Kazartsev

28 August 2024 3	Pari Nizhny Novgorod	0–1	Krasnodar	Nizhny Novgorod
17:15 MSK (UTC+3)	Glushchenkov (yellow card) 28'; Bozhenov (yellow card) 74'; Troshechkin (yellow card) 76'	Report	Tormena (yellow card) 28'; Kozlov 36'; Arutyunyan (yellow card) 69'; Castaño (yellow card) 80'	Stadium: Nizhny Novgorod Stadium; Attendance: 9,002; Referee: Arthur Fedorov

18 September 2024 4	CSKA Moscow	2–0	Krasnodar	Moscow
19:00 MSK (UTC+3)	Gajić 32'; Torop (yellow card) 48'; Kislyak (yellow card) 58' (goal) 89'	Report	Tormena (yellow card) 24'; Pina (yellow card) 31'; González (yellow card) 90+3'	Stadium: VEB Arena; Attendance: 20,117; Referee: Sergey Cheban

2 October 2024 5	Akhmat Grozny	3–0	Krasnodar	Grozny
21:15 MSK (UTC+3)	Ghandri 19'; Ismael (yellow card) 30'; Kovachev 45+4'; Kamilov (yellow card) 49'; Talal 82'	Report	González (yellow card) 43'; Krivtsov (yellow card) 45+2'; Córdoba (red card) 77'	Stadium: Akhmat-Arena; Attendance: 6,723; Referee: Pavel Shadykhanov

23 October 2024 6	Krasnodar	1–2	Pari Nizhny Novgorod	Krasnodar
21:15 MSK (UTC+3)	Castaño (yellow card) 32'; Spertsyan (yellow card) 76'; Olusegun 89'; Chernikov (yellow card) 90+2'	Report	Vedernikov (yellow card) 55'; Tsarukyan 61'; Bozhenov (yellow card) 81'; Lukyanov (yellow card) 82'; Karič 90+3'	Stadium: Krasnodar Stadium; Attendance: 34,291; Referee: Evgeniy Kukulyak

==== Knockout phase ====
26 November 2024 Regions path Quarter-finals Stage 1	Tyumen	3–3 (2–4 p)	Krasnodar	Tyumen
16:00 MSK (UTC+3)	Poroykov (yellow card) 45+1' (goal) 57', 62'; Khramtsov (yellow card) 79'; Shavlokhov (yellow card) 82'; Tkachuk 87'	Report	Kozlov 22'; Smolov 39', 53'; Koksharov (yellow card) 86'	Stadium: Geolog Stadium; Attendance: 7,114; Referee: Ranel Ziyakov
	Penalties
	Kosarev (penalty missed); Klyonkin (penalty scored); Karpov (penalty missed); Khramtsov (penalty scored)		(penalty missed) Gazinsky; (penalty scored) Kozlov; (penalty scored) Kuchugura; (penalty scored) Koksharov; (penalty scored) Castaño

11 March 2025 Regions path Quarter-finals Stage 2	Krasnodar	1–2	Akhmat Grozny	Krasnodar
20:30 MSK (UTC+3)	Córdoba 56' (yellow card) 86'; Cobnan (yellow card) 76'	Report	Luna Diale (yellow card) 20'; Kamilov (yellow card) 36'; Berisha 66', 72' (pen.) (yellow card) 83'	Stadium: Krasnodar Stadium; Attendance: 24,177; Referee: Sergey Cheban

== Squad statistics ==
As of match played 24 May 2025

=== Appearances and goals ===
No.	Pos	Nat	Player	Total		Premier League		Russian Cup		Super Cup	
No.	Pos	Nat	Player	Apps	Goals	Apps	Goals	Apps	Goals	Apps	Goals
1	GK	(Russia) RUS	Stanislav Agkatsev	34	0	30	0	3	0	1	0
3	DF	(Brazil) BRA	Vítor Tormena	27	2	22+1	2	3	0	1	0
4	DF	(Brazil) BRA	Diego Costa	32	1	28	1	1+3	0	0	0
6	MF	(Cape Verde) CPV	Kevin Pina	34	3	24+5	3	3+1	0	1	0
7	FW	(Brazil) BRA	Victor Sá	29	3	24+1	3	1+2	0	1	0
8	MF	(Russia) RUS	Danila Kozlov	32	4	3+20	2	7+1	2	0+1	0
9	FW	(Colombia) COL	Jhon Córdoba	30	13	25	12	3+2	1	0	0
10	MF	(Armenia) ARM	Eduard Spertsyan	35	11	27+1	11	1+5	0	1	0
11	FW	(Angola) ANG	João Batxi	36	5	28+2	5	2+3	0	1	0
13	GK	(Russia) RUS	Yury Dyupin	5	0	0	0	5	0	0	0
15	DF	(Uruguay) URU	Lucas Olaza	33	1	27	1	5+1	0	0	0
18	MF	(Russia) RUS	Yury Gazinsky	7	1	0+3	1	2+2	0	0	0
19	FW	(Russia) RUS	Fyodor Smolov	24	4	3+13	1	4+3	2	1	1
20	DF	(Uruguay) URU	Giovanni González	27	0	9+13	0	3+2	0	0	0
31	DF	(Brazil) BRA	Kaio Pantaleão	19	1	12+1	1	5	0	1	0
40	DF	(Nigeria) NGR	Olakunle Olusegun	28	3	4+15	2	7+1	1	1	0
53	MF	(Russia) RUS	Aleksandr Chernikov	35	2	23+4	2	4+3	0	1	0
59	MF	(Russia) RUS	Artyom Khmarin	2	0	0	0	0+2	0	0	0
88	MF	(Russia) RUS	Nikita Krivtsov	35	6	11+16	5	7	0	1	1
90	FW	(Nigeria) NGR	Moses Cobnan	34	4	4+21	4	8	0	0+1	0
98	DF	(Russia) RUS	Sergei Petrov	30	0	21+6	0	2+1	0	0	0
Players away from the club on loan:
23	DF	(Russia) RUS	Aleksandr Ektov	3	0	0+1	0	1	0	0+1	0
62	MF	(Russia) RUS	Yevgeny Kovalevsky	2	0	0	0	0+1	0	0+1	0
94	FW	(Russia) RUS	Dmitry Kuchugura	1	0	0	0	0+1	0	0	0
96	FW	(Russia) RUS	Aleksandr Koksharov	2	0	0	0	0+2	0	0	0
Players who appeared for Krasnodar but left during the season:
5	MF	(Colombia) COL	Kevin Castaño	22	1	5+11	1	4+2	0	0	0
33	DF	(Armenia) ARM	Georgy Arutyunyan	7	0	0	0	7	0	0	0

=== Goal scorers ===
Place	Position	Nation	Number	Name	Premier League	Russian Cup	Super Cup	Total
1	FW	(Colombia)	9	Jhon Córdoba	12	1	0	13
2	MF	(Armenia)	10	Eduard Spertsyan	11	0	0	11
3	MF	(Russia)	88	Nikita Krivtsov	5	0	1	6
4	FW	(Angola)	11	João Batxi	5	0	0	5
5	MF	(Cape Verde)	6	Kevin Pina	3	1	0	4
5	DF	(Nigeria)	40	Olakunle Olusegun	3	1	0	4
5	MF	(Russia)	8	Danila Kozlov	2	2	0	4
5	FW	(Russia)	19	Fyodor Smolov	1	2	1	4
9	FW	(Brazil)	7	Victor Sá	3	0	0	3
9	FW	(Nigeria)	90	Moses Cobnan	3	0	0	3
9				Own goal	2	1	0	3
12	MF	(Russia)	53	Aleksandr Chernikov	2	0	0	2
12	DF	(Brazil)	3	Vítor Tormena	2	0	0	2
14	MF	(Colombia)	5	Kevin Castaño	1	0	0	1
14	DF	(Brazil)	4	Diego Costa	1	0	0	1
14	MF	(Russia)	18	Yury Gazinsky	1	0	0	1
14	DF	(Brazil)	31	Kaio Pantaleão	1	0	0	1
14	DF	(Uruguay)	15	Lucas Olaza	1	0	0	1
Total					59	8	2	69

=== Clean sheets ===
Place	Position	Nation	Number	Name	Premier League	Russian Cup	Super Cup	Total
1	GK	(Russia)	1	Stanislav Agkatsev	15	2	0	17
2	GK	(Russia)	13	Yury Dyupin	0	1	0	1
Total					15	3	0	18

=== Disciplinary record ===
Number	Nation	Position	Name	Premier League		Russian Cup		Super Cup		Total	
Number	Nation	Position	Name	Yellow card	Red card	Yellow card	Red card	Yellow card	Red card	Yellow card	Red card
1	(Russia)	GK	Stanislav Agkatsev	2	0	0	0	0	0	2	0
3	(Brazil)	DF	Vítor Tormena	4	0	2	0	0	0	6	0
4	(Brazil)	DF	Diego Costa	6	1	0	0	0	0	6	1
6	(Cape Verde)	MF	Kevin Pina	6	0	1	0	1	0	8	0
7	(Brazil)	FW	Victor Sá	4	0	0	0	0	0	4	0
8	(Russia)	MF	Danila Kozlov	3	0	0	0	0	0	3	0
9	(Colombia)	FW	Jhon Córdoba	9	1	1	1	0	0	10	2
10	(Armenia)	MF	Eduard Spertsyan	2	0	1	0	0	0	3	0
11	(Angola)	FW	João Batxi	3	0	2	0	0	0	5	0
15	(Uruguay)	DF	Lucas Olaza	4	0	1	0	0	0	5	0
19	(Russia)	FW	Fyodor Smolov	1	0	0	0	0	0	1	0
20	(Uruguay)	DF	Giovanni González	4	0	2	0	0	0	6	0
31	(Brazil)	MF	Kaio Pantaleão	2	0	0	0	0	0	2	0
40	(Nigeria)	DF	Olakunle Olusegun	1	0	1	0	0	0	2	0
53	(Russia)	MF	Aleksandr Chernikov	9	0	2	0	0	0	11	0
88	(Russia)	MF	Nikita Krivtsov	2	0	1	0	0	0	3	0
90	(Nigeria)	FW	Moses Cobnan	3	0	1	0	0	0	4	0
98	(Russia)	DF	Sergei Petrov	4	0	0	0	0	0	4	0
Players away on loan:
96	(Russia)	FW	Aleksandr Koksharov	0	0	1	0	0	0	1	0
Players who left Krasnodar during the season:
5	(Colombia)	MF	Kevin Castaño	1	0	3	0	0	0	4	0
33	(Armenia)	DF	Georgy Arutyunyan	0	0	1	0	0	0	1	0
Total				70	2	20	1	1	0	91	3
