= Dmitry Kuchugura =

Russian footballer

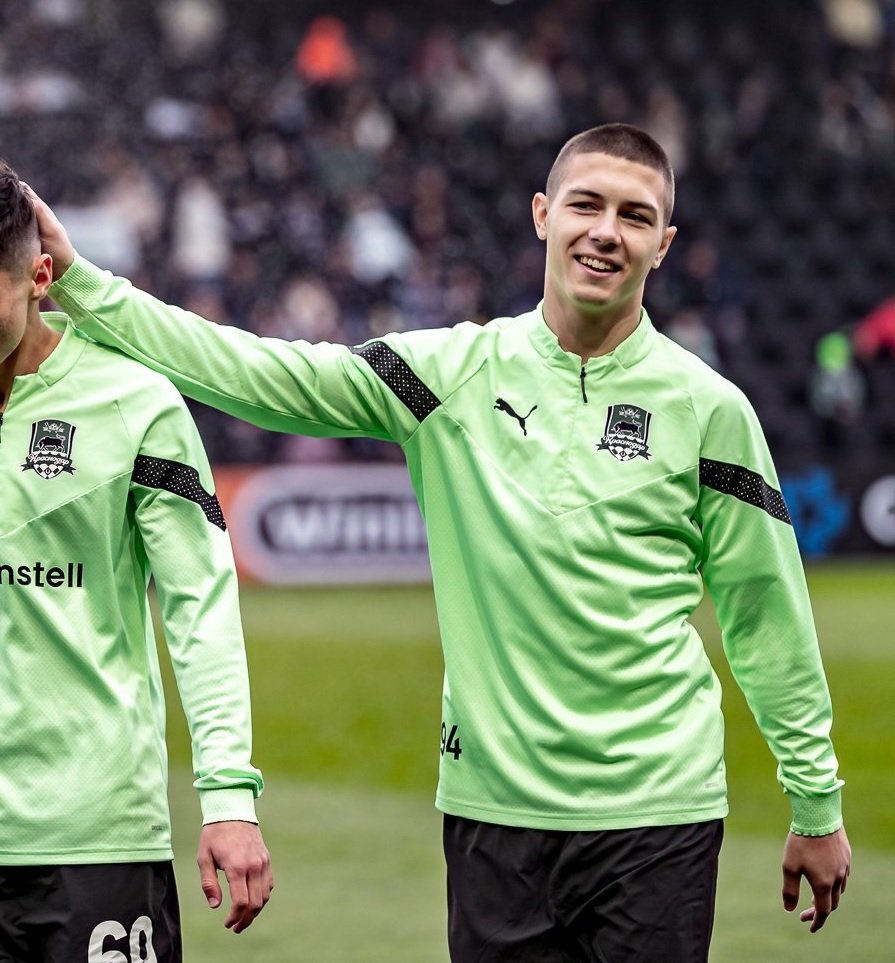
- Kuchugura with Krasnodar-2 in 2022

Personal information
- Full name: Dmitry Vitalyevich Kuchugura
- Date of birth: 21 October 2004 (age 22)
- Place of birth: Krasnodar, Russia
- Height: 1.78 m (5 ft 10 in)
- Position: Right winger

Team information
- Current team: Veles Moscow
- Number: 94

Youth career
- Krasnodar

Senior career*
Years	Team	Apps	(Gls)
2022–2026	Krasnodar	1	(0)
2022–2024	Krasnodar-2	55	(6)
2024–2025	→ Ural Yekaterinburg (loan)	2	(0)
2025–2026	→ Neftekhimik Nizhnekamsk (loan)	12	(0)
2026–	Veles Moscow	0	(0)

International career^{‡}
2020	Russia U16	3	(0)
2021	Russia U18	4	(1)
2023–2024	Russia U21	5	(3)
- * Club domestic league appearances and goals as of 4 July 2026 ‡ National team caps and goals as of 4 July 2026

Dmitry Vitalyevich Kuchugura (Russian: Дмитрий Витальевич Кучугура; born 21 October 2004) is a Russian football player who plays for Veles Moscow.

== Club career ==
Kuchugura made his debut in the Russian Premier League for Krasnodar on 7 March 2022 in a game against Ural Yekaterinburg. His next appearance for Krasnodar's main squad came on 26 November 2024 in a Russian Cup game against Tyumen, he was a late substitute and converted his penalty kick in the shoot-out that was held after the game ended in a 3–3 draw.

On 23 December 2024, Kuchugura was loaned to Ural Yekaterinburg until the end of the 2024–25 season.

On 26 July 2025, he moved on a new loan to Neftekhimik Nizhnekamsk.

== Career statistics ==
As of match played 31 May 2025

Appearances and goals by club, season and competition
Club	Season	League			Cup		Europe		Other		Total	
Club	Season	Division	Apps	Goals	Apps	Goals	Apps	Goals	Apps	Goals	Apps	Goals
Krasnodar	2021–22	Russian Premier League	1	0	0	0	–		–		1	0
Krasnodar	2024–25	Russian Premier League	0	0	1	0	–		0	0	1	0
Krasnodar	Total		1	0	1	0	–		0	0	2	0
Krasnodar-2	2021–22	Russian First League	7	1	–		–		–		7	1
Krasnodar-2	2022–23	Russian First League	15	2	–		–		–		15	2
Krasnodar-2	2023–24	Russian Second League	28	2	–		–		–		28	2
Krasnodar-2	2024–25	Russian Second League	5	1	–		–		–		5	1
Krasnodar-2	Total		55	6	–		–		–		55	6
Ural Yekaterinburg (loan)	2024–25	Russian First League	2	0	1	0	–		0	0	3	0
Career total			58	6	2	0	0	0	0	0	60	6
