= Yevgeny Kovalevsky =

Russian footballer (born 2005)

Personal information
- Full name: Yevgeny Vladislavovich Kovalevsky
- Date of birth: 24 November 2005 (age 20)
- Height: 1.75 m (5 ft 9 in)
- Position: Left winger

Team information
- Current team: Volgar Astrakhan (on loan from Krasnodar)
- Number: 62

Youth career
- Krasnodar

Senior career*
Years	Team	Apps	(Gls)
2024–2025	Krasnodar-2	9	(2)
2024–2025	Krasnodar	0	(0)
2025	→ Spartak Kostroma (loan)	7	(0)
2025–2026	→ Kuban Krasnodar (loan)	21	(0)
2026–	→ Volgar Astrakhan (loan)	13	(0)
- * Club domestic league appearances and goals as of 15 November 2026

Yevgeny Vladislavovich Kovalevsky (Russian: Евгений Владиславович Ковалевский; born 24 November 2005) is a Russian football player who plays as a left winger for Volgar Astrakhan on loan from Krasnodar.

== Career ==
Kovalevsky made his debut for the senior squad of Krasnodar on 13 July 2024 in a 2024 Russian Super Cup game against Zenit St. Peterburg.

== Career statistics ==
As of match played 14 June 2025

Appearances and goals by club, season and competition
Club	Season	League			Cup		Europe		Other		Total	
Club	Season	Division	Apps	Goals	Apps	Goals	Apps	Goals	Apps	Goals	Apps	Goals
Krasnodar-2	2023–24	Russian Second League A	0	0	—		—		—		0	0
Krasnodar-2	2024–25	Russian Second League A	9	2	—		—		—		9	2
Krasnodar-2	Total		9	2	0	0	0	0	0	0	9	2
Krasnodar	2024–25	Russian Premier League	0	0	1	0	—		1 (Note: Appearance in Russian Super Cup)	0	2	0
Spartak Kostroma (loan)	2024–25	Russian Second League A	7	0	0	0	—		—		7	0
Career total			16	2	1	0	0	0	1	0	18	2
