= Giovanni González =

Uruguayan footballer (born 1994)

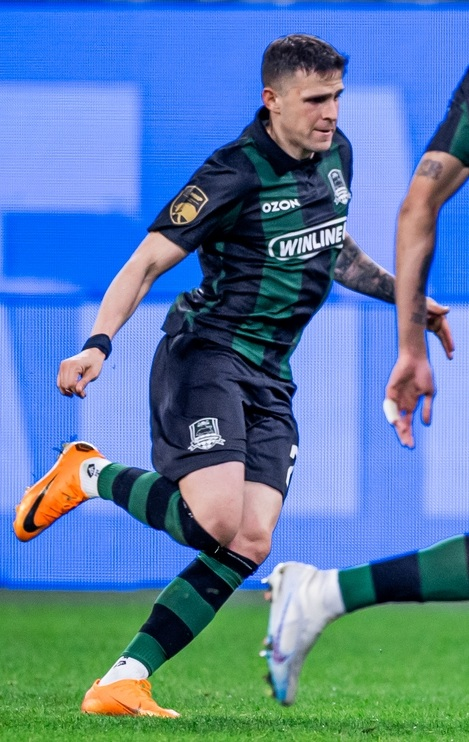
- González with Krasnodar in 2026

Personal information
- Full name: Giovanni Alessandro González Apud
- Date of birth: 20 September 1994 (age 32)
- Place of birth: Montevideo, Uruguay
- Height: 1.73 m (5 ft 8 in)
- Positions: Right-back; centre-back

Team information
- Current team: River Plate
- Number: 20

Youth career
- Danubio
- River Plate Montevideo

Senior career*
Years	Team	Apps	(Gls)
2014–2017	River Plate Montevideo	66	(3)
2018–2021	Peñarol	100	(5)
2022–2024	Mallorca	58	(2)
2024–2026	Krasnodar	46	(0)
2026–	River Plate	1	(0)

International career^{‡}
2019–2023	Uruguay	17	(0)
- * Club domestic league appearances and goals as of 17 May 2026 ‡ National team caps and goals as of 24 March 2023

Giovanni Alessandro González Apud (born 20 September 1994) is a Uruguayan professional footballer who plays as a defender for Argentine Primera División club River Plate. Mainly a right-back, González can also play as a centre-back.

== Club career ==
González started his career with River Plate Montevideo in 2014. He joined Peñarol in January 2018. On 29 January 2022, González moved abroad and signed a two-and-a-half-year contract with La Liga side RCD Mallorca.

On 17 August 2024, González signed a three-year contract with Krasnodar in Russia.

On 30 June 2026, González signed with River Plate in Argentina until 31 December 2027.

== International career ==
González received his first call-up to Uruguay national team in March 2019 for the 2019 China Cup. He debuted on 22 March 2019 in a 3–0 victory against Uzbekistan, as a 61st minute substitute for Diego Laxalt.

== Personal life ==
González is the son of former Uruguayan international Juan González.

== Career statistics ==
=== Club ===
As of match played 24 May 2026

Appearances and goals by club, season and competition
Club	Season	League			National cup		Continental		Other		Total	
Club	Season	Division	Apps	Goals	Apps	Goals	Apps	Goals	Apps	Goals	Apps	Goals
River Plate	2014	Argentine Primera División	3	0	0	0	0	0	0	0	3	0
River Plate	2015	Argentine Primera División	14	0	0	0	0	0	0	0	14	0
River Plate	2016	Argentine Primera División	13	0	0	0	6 (Note: Appearances in Copa Libertadores)	0	0	0	19	0
River Plate	2016–17	Argentine Primera División	20	0	0	0	—		—		20	0
River Plate	2017–18	Argentine Primera División	16	3	0	0	—		—		16	3
River Plate	Total		66	3	0	0	6	0	0	0	72	3
Peñarol	2018	Uruguayan Primera División	19	2	0	0	6 (Note: Four appearances in Copa Libertadores, two appearances in Copa Sudamericana)	0	2 (Note: One appearance in Supercopa Uruguaya, one appearance in Uruguayan Primera División play-offs)	0	26	2
Peñarol	2019	Uruguayan Primera División	30	0	0	0	8 (Note: Five appearances in Copa Libertadores, three appearances in Copa Sudamericana)	0	2 (Note: One appearance in Supercopa Uruguaya, one appearance in Uruguayan Primera División play-offs)	0	39	0
Peñarol	2020	Uruguayan Primera División	32	3	0	0	8 (Note: Six appearances in Copa Libertadores, two appearances in Copa Sudamericana)	0	—		40	3
Peñarol	2021	Uruguayan Primera División	21	0	0	0	14 (Note: Appearances in Copa Sudamericana)	0	1 (Note: Appearance in Uruguayan Primera División play-offs)	0	36	0
Peñarol	Total		100	5	0	0	36	0	5	0	141	5
Mallorca	2021–22	La Liga	9	1	1	0	—		—		10	1
Mallorca	2022–23	La Liga	15	0	4	0	—		—		19	0
Mallorca	2023–24	La Liga	34	1	8	2	—		—		42	3
Mallorca	Total		58	2	13	2	—		—		71	4
Krasnodar	2024–25	Russian Premier League	22	0	5	0	—		—		27	0
Krasnodar	2025–26	Russian Premier League	24	0	10	0	—		1 (Note: Appearance in Russian Super Cup)	0	35	0
Krasnodar	Total		46	0	15	0	—		1	0	62	0
Career total			269	10	28	2	42	0	6	0	345	12

=== International ===
As of match played 24 March 2023

Appearances and goals by national team and year
National team	Year	Apps	Goals
Uruguay	2019	8	0
Uruguay	2020	0	0
Uruguay	2021	8	0
Uruguay	2022	0	0
Uruguay	2023	1	0
Total		17	0

== Honours ==
Peñarol

- Uruguayan Primera División: 2018, 2021
- Supercopa Uruguaya: 2018

Krasnodar

- Russian Premier League: 2024–25
