= Artyom Khmarin =

Russian footballer (born 2007)

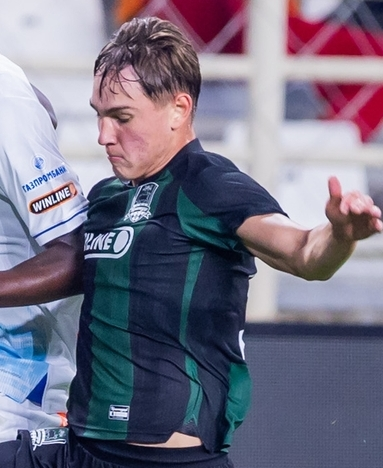

Personal information
- Full name: Artyom Vladimirovich Khmarin
- Date of birth: 3 May 2007 (age 19)
- Place of birth: Armavir, Russia
- Height: 1.80 m (5 ft 11 in)
- Position: Left-back

Team information
- Current team: Krasnodar
- Number: 59

Youth career
- –2024: Krasnodar

Senior career*
Years	Team	Apps	(Gls)
2024–	Krasnodar	3	(0)

International career^{‡}
2022–2023	Russia U-16	7	(1)
2023	Russia U-17	4	(0)
2024–2025	Russia U-18	5	(0)
2025	Russia U-19	6	(0)
2026–	Russia U-21	4	(0)
- * Club domestic league appearances and goals as of 15 August 2026 ‡ National team caps and goals as of 9 June 2026

Artyom Vladimirovich Khmarin (Russian: Артём Владимирович Хмарин; born 3 May 2007) is a Russian football player who plays as a left-back for Krasnodar.

== Career ==
Khmarin made his debut for the senior squad of Krasnodar on 15 August 2024 in a Russian Cup game against Akhmat Grozny.

He made his Russian Premier League debut for Krasnodar on 24 August 2025 in a game against Krylia Sovetov Samara.

== Career statistics ==
As of 13 October 2026

Club	Season	League			Cup		Total	
Club	Season	Division	Apps	Goals	Apps	Goals	Apps	Goals
Krasnodar	2024–25	Russian Premier League	0	0	2	0	2	0
Krasnodar	2025–26	Russian Premier League	2	0	10	0	12	0
Krasnodar	2026–27	Russian Premier League	1	0	4	0	5	0
Career total			3	0	16	0	19	0
