= Lucas Olaza =

Uruguayan footballer (born 1994)

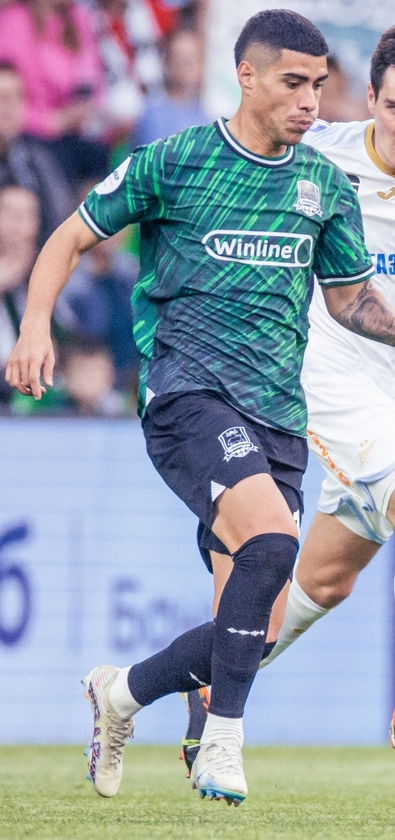
- Olaza with Krasnodar in 2024

Personal information
- Full name: Lucas René Olaza Catrofe
- Date of birth: 21 July 1994 (age 32)
- Place of birth: Montevideo, Uruguay
- Height: 1.73 m (5 ft 8 in)
- Position: Left-back

Team information
- Current team: Krasnodar
- Number: 15

Youth career
- 2009–2011: River Plate Montevideo

Senior career*
Years	Team	Apps	(Gls)
2011–2016	River Plate Montevideo	31	(7)
2014–2015	→ Atlético Paranaense (loan)	6	(0)
2015–2016	→ Celta B (loan)	24	(0)
2016–2017	Danubio	27	(6)
2017–2019	Talleres	24	(4)
2018–2019	→ Boca Juniors (loan)	4	(0)
2019–2021	Boca Juniors	0	(0)
2019–2021	→ Celta (loan)	63	(1)
2021	→ Valladolid (loan)	14	(1)
2021–2023	Valladolid	34	(0)
2022	→ Elche (loan)	5	(1)
2023–	Krasnodar	93	(5)

International career^{‡}
2012–2013	Uruguay U20	9	(0)
2023–	Uruguay	7	(0)
Medal record
Representing Uruguay
Men's Football
Copa América
Third place	2024 United States
FIFA U-20 World Cup
Runner-up	2013 Turkey
- * Club domestic league appearances and goals as of 22 November 2026 ‡ National team caps and goals as of 10 September 2024

Lucas René Olaza Catrofe (born 21 July 1994) is a Uruguayan professional footballer who plays as a left-back for Russian Premier League club Krasnodar and the Uruguay national team.

== Club career ==
Olaza was born in Montevideo. After graduating from River Plate's youth system, he made his professional debut on 19 February 2012, in a 3–2 away loss against Nacional.

On 7 January 2014, Olaza joined Série A side Atlético Paranaense, in a season-long loan deal. He made his Série A debut on 20 April, playing the last 23 minutes in a 1–0 home win against Grêmio.

On 29 July 2015, Olaza moved to La Liga side Celta de Vigo, initially assigned to the reserves in Segunda División B. After his loan ended, he returned to his home country and joined Danubio.

On 27 July 2017, Olaza agreed to a three-year deal with Talleres de Córdoba, as the club bought 70% of his federative rights. On 1 August of the following year, he moved to fellow Argentine Primera División side Boca Juniors, helping the side reach the 2018 Copa Libertadores Finals.

On 31 January 2019, Olaza returned to Celta, now being assigned to the main squad after agreeing to a six-month loan. He made his debut for Celta on 30 March 2019, starting in a 3–2 win against Villarreal, where he provided the assist for the second goal. He remained an integral part of the starting XI from this point, eventually helping the team to escape relegation on the final matchday. Following his decent performances, his loan was extended to another year on 2 July 2019.

On 1 February 2021, Olaza joined Real Valladolid on loan until the end of the season. The move was made permanent in the summer of 2021, as he signed a contract until June 2025.

On 31 January 2022, Olaza returned to the top tier after agreeing to a loan deal with Elche, with a buyout clause.

On 6 August 2023, Olaza signed a contract with Russian Premier League club Krasnodar for two years, with a conditional option for a third year.

On 11 September 2026, Olaza extended his Krasnodar contract until June 2028.

== International career ==
On 21 October 2022, Olaza was named in Uruguay's 55-man preliminary squad for the 2022 FIFA World Cup. In June 2023, he received his first call-up to the senior team for friendly matches against Nicaragua and Cuba. He made his debut on 14 June 2023 in a 4–1 win against Nicaragua.

In June 2024, Olaza was named in Uruguay's 26-man squad for the 2024 Copa América.

== Career statistics ==
=== Club ===
As of match played 22 November 2026

Appearances and goals by club, season and competition
Club	Season	League			National cup		Continental		Other		Total	
Club	Season	Division	Apps	Goals	Apps	Goals	Apps	Goals	Apps	Goals	Apps	Goals
River Plate Montevideo	2012–13	Uruguayan Primera División	16	1	—		—		—		16	1
River Plate Montevideo	2013–14	Uruguayan Primera División	—		—		4 (Note: Appearance(s) in Copa Sudamericana)	0	—		4	0
River Plate Montevideo	2014–15	Uruguayan Primera División	15	6	—		—		—		15	6
River Plate Montevideo	Total		31	7	0	0	4	0	0	0	35	7
Athletico Paranaense (loan)	2014	Série A	6	0	—		0	0	—		6	0
Celta B (loan)	2015–16	Segunda División B	24	0	—		—		—		24	0
Danubio	2016	Uruguayan Primera División	5	0	—		—		—		5	0
Danubio	2017	Uruguayan Primera División	22	6	—		2	2	—		24	8
Danubio	Total		27	6	—		2	2	—		48	8
Talleres	2017–18	Argentine Primera División	24	4	—		—		—		24	4
Boca Juniors (loan)	2017–18	Argentine Primera División	4	0	1	0	6 (Note: Appearance(s) in Copa Libertadores)	0	—		7	0
Boca Juniors	2018–19	Argentine Primera División	0	0	0	0	0	0	—		4	0
Celta Vigo	2018–19	La Liga	10	0	0	0	—		—		10	0
Celta Vigo	2019–20	La Liga	35	1	2	0	—		—		37	1
Celta Vigo	2020–21	La Liga	18	0	0	0	—		—		18	0
Celta Vigo	Total		63	1	2	0	0	0	0	0	65	1
Real Valladolid (loan)	2020–21	La Liga	14	1	0	0	—		—		14	1
Real Valladolid	2021–22	La Liga	11	0	3	0	—		—		14	0
Real Valladolid	2022–23	La Liga	23	0	0	0	—		—		23	0
Real Valladolid	Total		34	0	3	0	0	0	0	0	37	0
Elche (loan)	2021–22	La Liga	5	1	—		—		—		5	1
Krasnodar	2023–24	Russian Premier League	25	1	4	0	—		—		29	1
Krasnodar	2024–25	Russian Premier League	27	1	6	0	—		—		33	1
Krasnodar	2025–26	Russian Premier League	27	1	7	0	—		1 (Note: Appearance in Russian Super Cup)	0	35	1
Krasnodar	2026–27	Russian Premier League	14	2	1	0	—		—		15	2
Krasnodar	Total		93	5	18	0	—		1	0	112	5
Career total			325	25	24	0	12	2	1	0	362	27

=== International ===
As of match played 10 September 2024

Appearances and goals by national team and year
National team	Year	Apps	Goals
Uruguay	2023	1	0
Uruguay	2024	6 (Note: Includes a Non-FIFA friendly played against the Basque Country, which is counted as an official match by the Uruguayan Football Association.)	0
Total		7	0

== Honours ==
Krasnodar

- Russian Premier League: 2024–25

Uruguay U20

- FIFA U-20 World Cup runner-up: 2013

Uruguay

- Copa América third place: 2024
