= Timur Abdrashitov =

Russian footballer (born 2002)

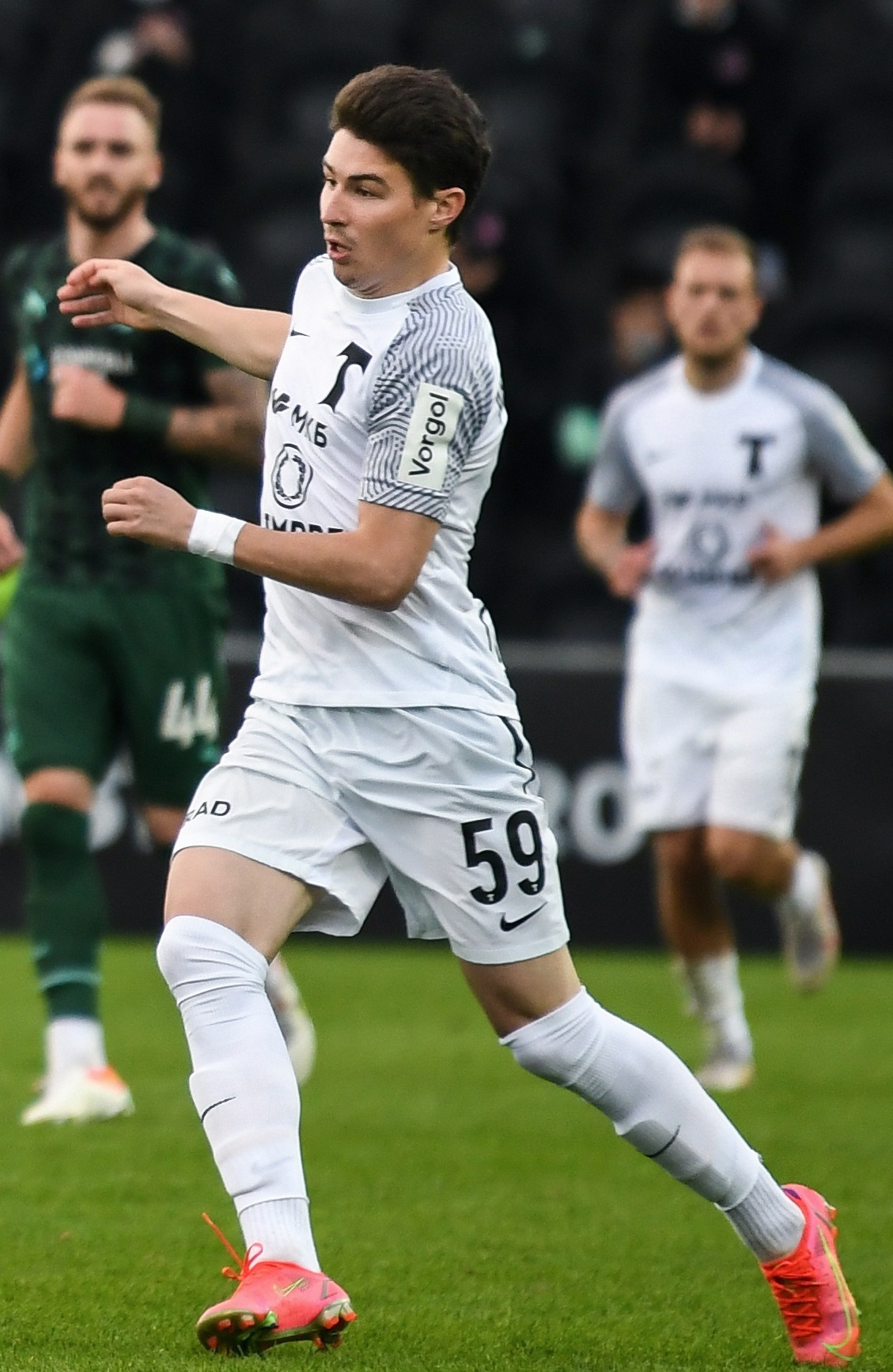
- Abdrashitov with Torpedo Moscow in 2021

Personal information
- Full name: Timur Khalilovich Abdrashitov
- Date of birth: 19 April 2002 (age 24)
- Place of birth: Perm, Russia
- Height: 1.76 m (5 ft 9 in)
- Position: Midfielder

Team information
- Current team: Krasnodar

Youth career
- 2008–2014: Perm Krai Football Academy
- 2014–2017: Chertanovo
- 2017–2019: Perm Krai Football Academy

Senior career*
| Years | Team | Apps | (Gls) |
| 2020 | Prikamye Perm (amateur) | | |
| 2020–2021 | Zvezda Perm | 26 | (2) |
| 2021–2022 | Torpedo Moscow | 5 | (0) |
| 2022–2023 | Amkar Perm | 15 | (0) |
| 2023–2024 | Kaluga | 34 | (12) |
| 2024– | Krasnodar | 0 | (0) |
| 2024 | → Krasnodar-2 | 18 | (1) |
| 2025 | → Uralets-TS Nizhny Tagil (loan) | 21 | (0) |
- * Club domestic league appearances and goals as of 19 October 2025

Timur Khalilovich Abdrashitov (Russian: Тимур Халилович Абдрашитов; born 19 April 2002) is a Russian football player who plays for Krasnodar.

== Club career ==
He made his debut in the Russian Professional Football League for Zvezda Perm on 9 August 2020 in a game against Lada-Tolyatti.

He made his debut in the Russian Football National League for Torpedo Moscow on 13 October 2021 in a game against Krasnodar-2.

On 16 August 2022, his contract with Torpedo was terminated by mutual consent.

On 12 July 2024, Abdrashitov signed a three-year contract with Krasnodar and was initially assigned to Krasnodar-2.

== Honours ==
Torpedo Moscow

- Russian Football National League: 2021–22
