= Danila Kozlov (footballer, born 2005) =

Russian footballer

Personal information
- Full name: Danila Sergeyevich Kozlov
- Date of birth: 19 January 2005 (age 21)
- Place of birth: Saint Petersburg, Russia
- Height: 1.83 m (6 ft 0 in)
- Position: Midfielder

Team information
- Current team: CSKA Moscow
- Number: 18

Youth career
- Zenit Saint Petersburg

Senior career*
Years	Team	Apps	(Gls)
2023	Zenit Saint Petersburg	2	(0)
2023	Zenit-2 St. Petersburg	1	(0)
2024	Baltika Kaliningrad	10	(2)
2024–2025	Krasnodar	33	(2)
2026–	CSKA Moscow	20	(2)

International career^{‡}
2019	Russia U15	2	(0)
2021	Russia U16	7	(2)
2021–2022	Russia U17	8	(3)
2022	Russia U18	2	(3)
2023	Russia U19	1	(0)
2023–2025	Russia U21	9	(1)
- * Club domestic league appearances and goals as of 7 November 2026 ‡ National team caps and goals as of 13 October 2025

Danila Sergeyevich Kozlov (Russian: Дани́ла Серге́евич Козло́в; born 19 January 2005) is a Russian football player who plays as an attacking midfielder for CSKA Moscow.

== Club career ==
He made his debut for Zenit St. Petersburg on 25 February 2023 in a Russian Cup game against Volga Ulyanovsk. He made his Russian Premier League debut for Zenit on 29 April 2023 against Krylia Sovetov Samara.

On 31 January 2024, Kozlov signed for Baltika Kaliningrad on a four-and-a-half-year contract.

On 27 June 2024, Kozlov signed a five-year contract with Krasnodar.

On 12 February 2026, Kozlov moved to CSKA Moscow on a three-and-a-half-year deal with an option to extend.

== Career statistics ==
As of match played 7 November 2026

Appearances and goals by club, season and competition
Club	Season	League			National cup		Other		Total	
Club	Season	Division	Apps	Goals	Apps	Goals	Apps	Goals	Apps	Goals
Zenit St. Petersburg	2022–23	Russian Premier League	2	0	1	0	—		3	0
Zenit-2	2023	Russian Second League	1	0	—		—		1	0
Baltika	2023–24	Russian Premier League	10	2	5	1	—		15	3
Krasnodar	2024–25	Russian Premier League	23	2	8	2	1 (Note: Appearances in Russian Super Cup)	0	32	4
Krasnodar	2025–26	Russian Premier League	10	0	8	5	1	0	19	5
Krasnodar	Total		33	2	16	7	2	0	51	9
CSKA Moscow	2025–26	Russian Premier League	12	2	3	0	—		15	2
CSKA Moscow	2026–27	Russian Premier League	8	0	3	1	—		11	1
CSKA Moscow	Total		20	2	6	1	0	0	26	3
Career total			66	6	28	9	2	0	96	15

== Honours ==
Zenit St. Petersburg

- Russian Premier League: 2022–23

Krasnodar

- Russian Premier League: 2024–25
