= Georgy Arutyunyan =

Armenian professional football player

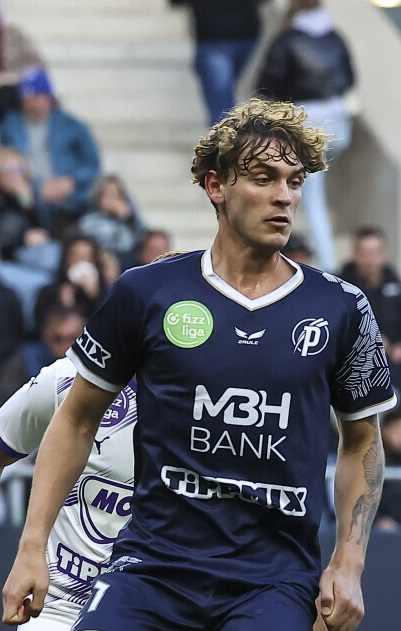
- Arutyunyan playing for Puskás Akadémia in 2025

Personal information
- Full name: Georgy Eduardovich Arutyunyan
- Date of birth: 9 August 2004 (age 22)
- Place of birth: Balakovo, Russia
- Height: 1.87 m (6 ft 2 in)
- Position: Centre-back

Team information
- Current team: Puskás Akadémia
- Number: 21

Youth career
- FC Krasnodar

Senior career*
Years	Team	Apps	(Gls)
2022–2025	FC Krasnodar-2	20	(3)
2023–2025	FC Krasnodar	6	(0)
2025–	Puskás Akadémia	46	(2)

International career^{‡}
2019	Russia U-16	2	(0)
2021	Russia U-17	2	(0)
2021	Russia U-18	5	(0)
2023–	Armenia	37	(1)
- * Club domestic league appearances and goals as of 18 September 2026 ‡ National team caps and goals as of 15 November 2026 (UTC)

Georgy Eduardovich Arutyunyan (Armenian: Գեորգի Հարությունյան; Russian: Георгий Эдуардович Арутюнян; born 9 August 2004) is a professional football player who plays as a centre-back for Hungarian club Puskás Akadémia. Born in Russia, he plays for the Armenia national football team.

== Club career ==
Arutyunyan started playing football in the academy of FC Krasnodar. In the 2021–22 season, he became the Youth Football League under-19 Russia champion. He become Russia Youth Champion with FC Krasnodar at the 2022–23 season.

On 7 August 2022, he played his first senior level match at Russian First League as part of Krasnodar-2 against KAMAZ.

On 27 May 2023, Arutyunyan made his Russian Premier League debut for FC Krasnodar against PFC CSKA Moscow.

On 11 June 2023, he debuted in the Russian Cup against PFC CSKA Moscow in the final, playing the entire match.

On 25 January 2025, Arutyunyan signed a three-and-a-half-year contract with Puskás Akadémia in Hungary.

== International career ==
From 2019 to 2021, Arutyunyan played for the youth teams of Russia of various ages.

At 18 years old he was called up to the Armenia national team for a UEFA Euro 2024 qualifying match against Turkey and a friendly match against Cyprus on 25 March 2023 and 28 March 2023 respectively.

Arutyunyan made his senior international debut for Armenia on 25 March 2023 in the UEFA Euro 2024 qualifying, against Turkey. He played for the entire match.

== Career statistics ==
=== Club ===
As of match played 24 May 2025

Appearances and goals by club, season and competition
Club	Season	League			Cup		Other		Total	
Club	Season	Division	Apps	Goals	Apps	Goals	Apps	Goals	Apps	Goals
Krasnodar-2	2022–23	Russian First League	10	0	—		—		10	0
Krasnodar-2	2023–24	Russian Second League A	6	2	—		—		6	2
Krasnodar-2	2024–25	Russian Second League A	4	1	—		—		4	1
Krasnodar-2	Total		20	3	—		—		20	3
Krasnodar	2022–23	Russian Premier League	2	0	1	0	—		3	0
Krasnodar	2023–24	Russian Premier League	4	0	6	1	—		10	1
Krasnodar	2024–25	Russian Premier League	0	0	7	0	—		7	0
Krasnodar	Total		6	0	14	1	—		20	1
Puskás Akadémia	2024–25	Nemzeti Bajnokság I	14	0	1	0	—		15	0
Career total			26	3	14	1	0	0	40	4

=== International ===
As of match played 15 November 2026

National team	Year	Apps	Goals
Armenia	2023	10	0
Armenia	2024	10	0
Armenia	2025	8	0
Armenia	2026	9	1
Total		37	1

List of international goals scored by Georgy Arutyunyan
No.	Date	Venue	Opponent	Score	Result	Competition
1.	25 September 2026	Vazgen Sargsyan Republican Stadium, Yerevan, Armenia	Latvia	1–0	2–0	2026–27 UEFA Nations League C
