= Sergei Petrov =

Russian footballer

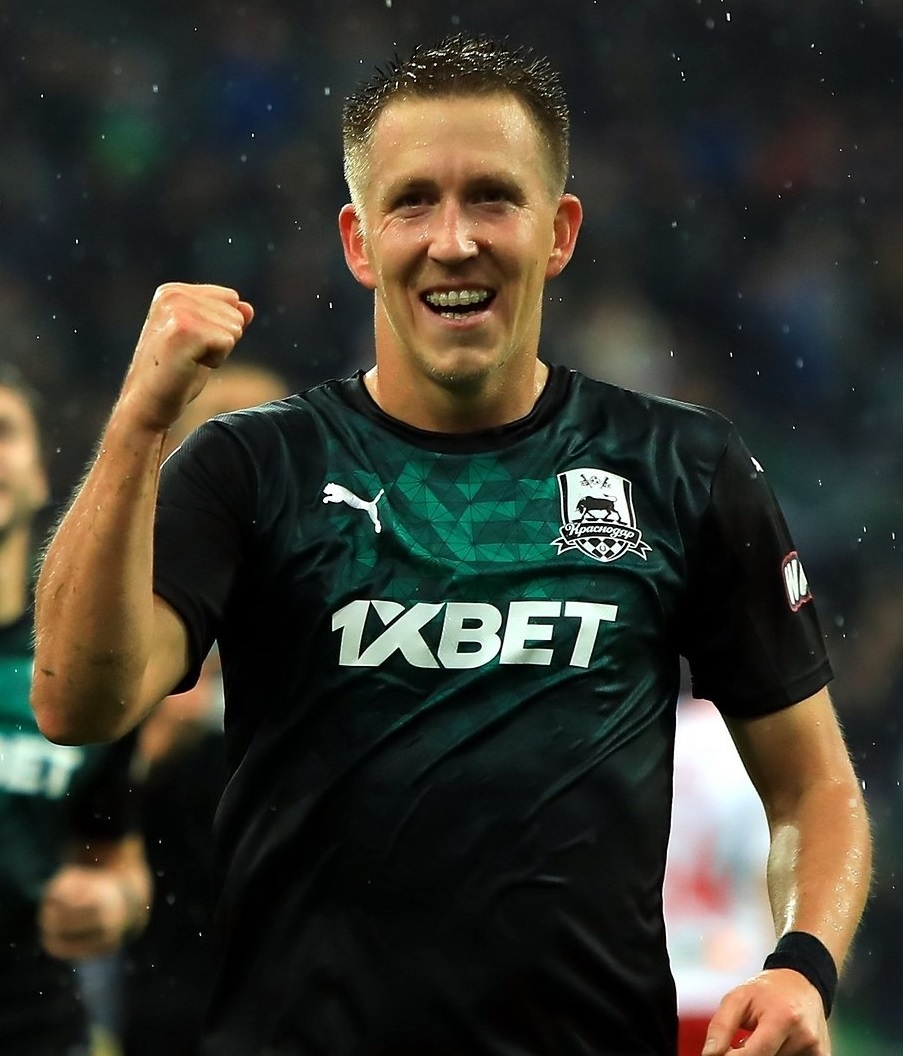
- Petrov with FC Krasnodar in 2019

Personal information
- Full name: Sergei Andreyevich Petrov
- Date of birth: 2 January 1991 (age 35)
- Place of birth: Nikolskoye, Russian SFSR
- Height: 1.75 m (5 ft 9 in)
- Positions: Right-back; left-back

Team information
- Current team: Krasnodar
- Number: 98

Youth career
- –2011: Zenit Saint Petersburg

Senior career*
Years	Team	Apps	(Gls)
2009–2011	Zenit Saint Petersburg	2	(0)
2011–2012	Krylia Sovetov Samara	39	(1)
2013–	Krasnodar	270	(13)

International career^{‡}
2008	Russia U-17	5	(0)
2010	Russia U-19	6	(0)
2011–2013	Russia U-21	18	(0)
2016–	Russia	5	(1)
- * Club domestic league appearances and goals as of 7 November 2026 ‡ National team caps and goals as of 19 November 2019

Sergei Andreyevich Petrov (Russian: Сергей Андреевич Петров; born 2 January 1991) is a Russian football player who plays as a right-back or left-back for FC Krasnodar.

== Career ==
He made his debut for the main Zenit Saint Petersburg squad on 13 March 2011 in a Russian Premier League game against FC Terek Grozny.

On 11 December 2014, Petrov extended his Krasnodar contract until the end of the 2015–16 season.

On 26 April 2024, Petrov extended his contract with Krasnodar for the 2024–25 season. On 26 May 2025, he signed another one-season extension. On 30 May 2026, he extended his Krasnodar contract to 30 June 2027.

== International career ==
He was called up to the senior Russia squad in August 2016 for matches against Turkey and Ghana. He made his debut against Ghana on 6 September 2016. On 13 October 2019, he played his first competitive international game against Cyprus in the UEFA Euro 2020 qualifier, but was injured by Costas Laifis and left the field at the end of the first half.

On 19 November 2019, he scored his first national team goal in another qualifier against San Marino.

== Career statistics ==
=== Club ===
As of match played 7 November 2026

Club	Season	League			Cup		Continental		Other		Total	
Club	Season	Division	Apps	Goals	Apps	Goals	Apps	Goals	Apps	Goals	Apps	Goals
Zenit Saint Petersburg	2008	Russian Premier League	0	0	0	0	0	0	–		0	0
Zenit Saint Petersburg	2009	Russian Premier League	0	0	0	0	0	0	–		0	0
Zenit Saint Petersburg	2010	Russian Premier League	0	0	0	0	0	0	–		0	0
Zenit Saint Petersburg	2011–12	Russian Premier League	2	0	0	0	0	0	–		2	0
Zenit Saint Petersburg	Total		2	0	0	0	0	0	0	0	2	0
Krylia Sovetov	2011–12	Russian Premier League	26	1	0	0	–		–		26	1
Krylia Sovetov	2012–13	Russian Premier League	13	0	1	1	–		–		14	1
Krylia Sovetov	Total		39	1	1	1	0	0	0	0	40	2
Krasnodar	2012–13	Russian Premier League	10	1	–		–		–		10	1
Krasnodar	2013–14	Russian Premier League	14	1	3	0	–		–		17	1
Krasnodar	2014–15	Russian Premier League	22	1	2	1	8	0	–		32	2
Krasnodar	2015–16	Russian Premier League	24	3	2	0	8	0	–		34	3
Krasnodar	2016–17	Russian Premier League	17	0	2	0	6	0	–		25	0
Krasnodar	2017–18	Russian Premier League	28	1	0	0	2	1	–		30	2
Krasnodar	2018–19	Russian Premier League	22	1	1	0	10	0	–		33	1
Krasnodar	2019–20	Russian Premier League	27	2	0	0	10	0	–		37	2
Krasnodar	2020–21	Russian Premier League	10	2	0	0	3	0	–		13	2
Krasnodar	2021–22	Russian Premier League	15	0	1	0	–		–		16	0
Krasnodar	2022–23	Russian Premier League	19	1	10	0	–		–		29	1
Krasnodar	2023–24	Russian Premier League	14	0	3	0	–		–		17	0
Krasnodar	2024–25	Russian Premier League	27	0	3	0	–		–		30	0
Krasnodar	2025–26	Russian Premier League	15	0	0	0	–		1 (Note: Appearance in Russian Super Cup)	0	16	0
Krasnodar	2026–27	Russian Premier League	6	0	2	0	–		–		8	0
Krasnodar	Total		270	13	29	1	47	1	1	0	347	15
Career total			311	14	30	2	47	1	1	0	389	17

=== International goals ===
Scores and results Russia's goal tally first.

No.	Date	Venue	Opponent	Score	Result	Competition
1.	19 November 2019	San Marino Stadium, Serravalle, San Marino	San Marino	2–0	5–0	UEFA Euro 2020 qualification

== Honours ==
Krasnodar

- Russian Premier League: 2024–25
