= Nikita Krivtsov =

Russian football player

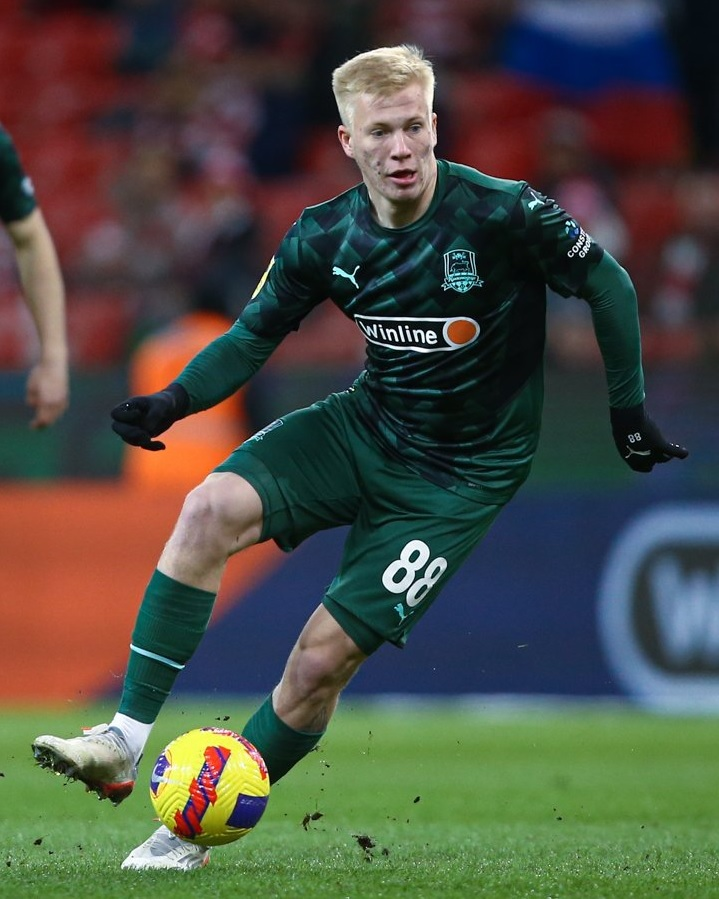
- Krivtsov with FC Krasnodar in 2022

Personal information
- Full name: Nikita Sergeyevich Krivtsov
- Date of birth: 18 August 2002 (age 24)
- Place of birth: Dzerzhinsk, Russia
- Height: 1.86 m (6 ft 1 in)
- Position: Attacking midfielder

Team information
- Current team: FC Krasnodar
- Number: 88

Youth career
- 2010–2019: Salyut Dzerzhinsk
- 2019–2020: Sokol Moscow
- 2020: FC Murom

Senior career*
Years	Team	Apps	(Gls)
2020–2021	Torpedo Vladimir	14	(2)
2021	→ Tom Tomsk (loan)	15	(4)
2021–2024	Krasnodar-2	7	(1)
2021–	Krasnodar	130	(25)

International career^{‡}
2021	Russia U21	2	(0)
2023–	Russia	5	(2)
- * Club domestic league appearances and goals as of 15 August 2026 ‡ National team caps and goals as of 9 June 2026

Nikita Sergeyevich Krivtsov (Russian: Никита Сергеевич Кривцов; born 18 August 2002) is a Russian football player who plays as an attacking midfielder for FC Krasnodar and Russia national team.

== Club career ==
He made his debut in the Russian Football National League for FC Tom Tomsk on 27 February 2021 in a game against FC Alania Vladikavkaz and scored a goal on his debut.

He made his Russian Premier League debut for FC Krasnodar on 13 September 2021 in a game against FC Rostov.

On 2 February 2024, Krivtsov signed a new contract with FC Krasnodar until June 2029.

== International career ==
Krivtsov was called up to the Russia national football team for the first time for a friendly against Kyrgyzstan in September 2022.

Krivtsov made his debut on 20 November 2023 in a friendly against Cuba and scored a goal in a 8–0 victory.

== Career statistics ==
=== Club ===
As of match played 19 August 2026

Appearances and goals by club, season and competition
Club	Season	League			Cup		Other		Total	
Club	Season	Division	Apps	Goals	Apps	Goals	Apps	Goals	Apps	Goals
Torpedo Vladimir	2020–21	Russian Second League	14	2	1	0	—		15	2
Torpedo Vladimir	2021–22	Russian Second League	0	0	1	1	—		1	1
Torpedo Vladimir	Total		14	2	2	1	—		16	3
Tom Tomsk	2020–21	Russian First League	15	4	—		—		15	4
Krasnodar-2	2021–22	Russian First League	4	1	—		—		4	1
Krasnodar-2	2024–25	Russian Second League A	3	0	—		—		3	0
Krasnodar-2	Total		7	1	0	0	0	0	7	1
Krasnodar	2021–22	Russian Premier League	20	2	2	0	—		22	2
Krasnodar	2022–23	Russian Premier League	20	6	7	2	—		27	8
Krasnodar	2023–24	Russian Premier League	30	2	5	1	—		35	3
Krasnodar	2024–25	Russian Premier League	27	5	7	0	1 (Note: Appearances in Russian Super Cup)	1	35	6
Krasnodar	2025–26	Russian Premier League	29	7	10	2	1	0	40	9
Krasnodar	2026–27	Russian Premier League	4	3	2	0	—		6	3
Krasnodar	Total		130	25	33	5	2	1	165	31
Career total			166	32	35	6	2	1	203	39

=== International ===
As of match played 9 June 2026

Appearances and goals by national team and year
National team	Year	Apps	Goals
Russia	2023	1	1
Russia	2024	2	1
Russia	2026	2	0
Total		5	2

Scores and results list Russia's goal tally first, score column indicates score after each Krivtsov goal.

List of international goals scored by Nikita Krivtsov
No.	Date	Venue	Opponent	Score	Result	Competition
1	20 November 2023	Volgograd Arena, Volgograd, Russia	Cuba	7–0	8–0	Friendly
2	15 November 2024	Krasnodar Stadium, Krasnodar, Russia	Brunei	6–0	11–0	Friendly

== Honours ==
Krasnodar

- Russian Premier League: 2024–25

Individual

- Russian Premier League player of the month: July/August 2026.
