= Victor Sá =

Brazilian footballer

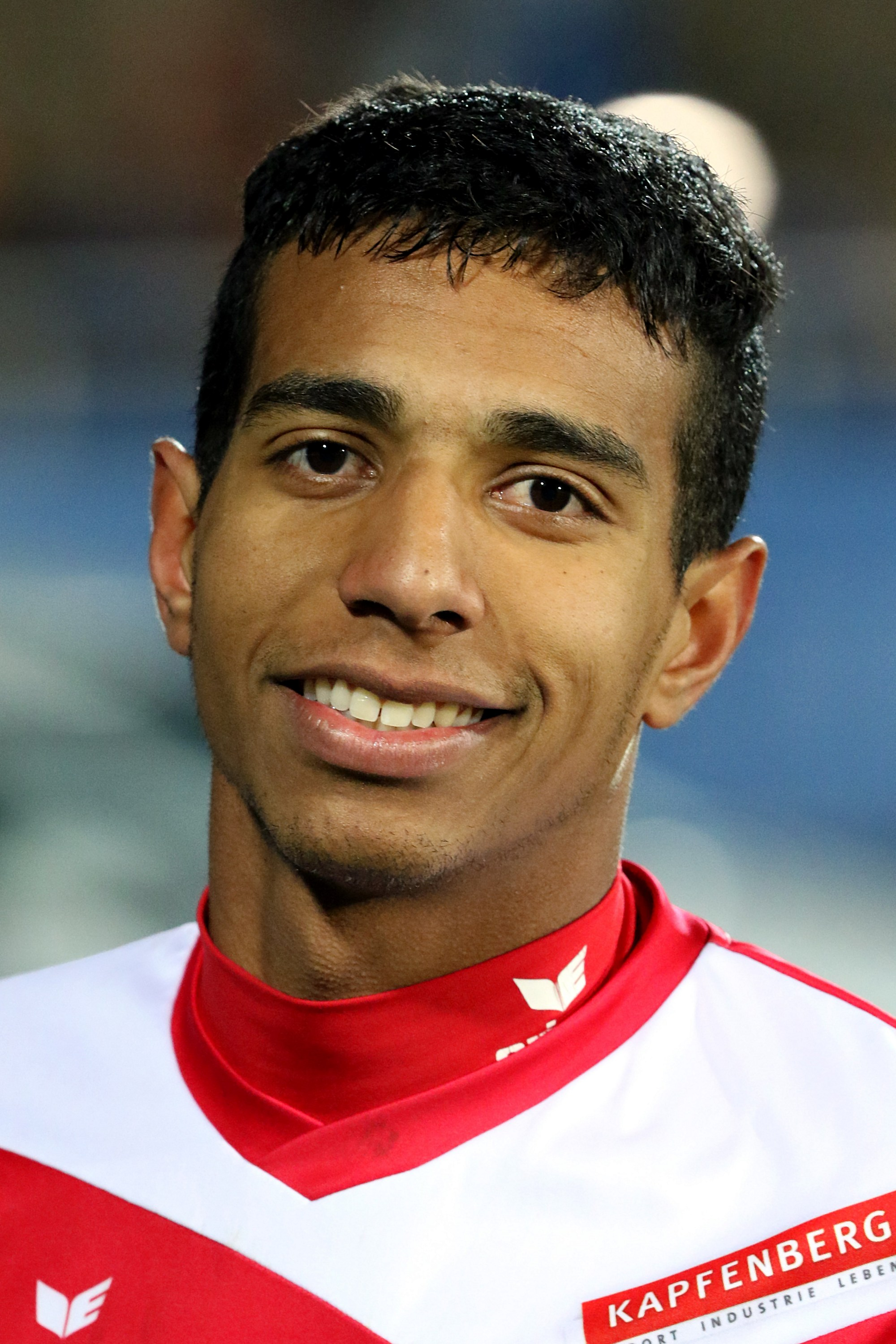

Personal information
- Full name: João Victor Santos Sá
- Date of birth: 27 March 1994 (age 32)
- Place of birth: São José dos Campos, Brazil
- Height: 1.78 m (5 ft 10 in)
- Position: Left winger

Team information
- Current team: São Paulo
- Number: 27

Youth career
- Primeira Camisa
- 2012–2013: Palmeiras

Senior career*
Years	Team	Apps	(Gls)
2011	Primeira Camisa	7	(0)
2014–2015	Joseense	31	(6)
2015–2017	Kapfenberg	64	(23)
2017–2019	LASK Linz	47	(20)
2019–2021	VfL Wolfsburg	53	(3)
2021–2022	Al Jazira	19	(1)
2022–2024	Botafogo	79	(8)
2024–2026	Krasnodar	59	(9)
2026–	São Paulo	0	(0)
- * Club domestic league appearances and goals as of 21 March 2026

João Victor Santos Sá (born 27 March 1994), known as João Victor or Victor Sá, is a Brazilian professional footballer who plays as a left winger for Campeonato Brasileiro Série A club São Paulo.

== Club career ==
Victor Sá failed a doping test in May 2017, testing positive for isometheptene and was eligible to play after receiving a 6-month ban, expiring on 26 November 2017.

After Oliver Glasner was appointed manager of VfL Wolfsburg, Glasner took Victor Sá with him from LASK Linz to the German club for the 2019–20 season. Victor Sá signed a 4-year contract with VfL Wolfsburg on 10 May 2019.

Victor Sá signed for Al Jazira Club in August 2021.

On 22 February 2024, Victor Sá signed a contract with Russian Premier League club Krasnodar until June 2025. On 23 September 2024, his contract with Krasnodar was extended to June 2026.

On 1 July 2026, Victor Sá returned to Brazil and signed a contract with São Paulo until 31 December 2029.

== Career statistics ==
As of match played 21 March 2026

Appearances and goals by club, season and competition
Club	Season	League			State League		National Cup		League Cup		Continental		Other		Total	
Club	Season	Division	Apps	Goals	Apps	Goals	Apps	Goals	Apps	Goals	Apps	Goals	Apps	Goals	Apps	Goals
Primeira Camisa	2011	Paulista 2ª Divisão	—		7	0	—		—		—		—		7	0
Joseense	2014	Paulista A3	—		17	3	—		—		—		—		17	3
Joseense	2015	Paulista A3	—		14	3	—		—		—		—		14	3
Joseense	Total		—		31	6	—		—		—		—		31	6
Kapfenberger SV	2015–16	2. Liga	29	9	—		1	0	—		—		—		30	9
Kapfenberger SV	2016–17	2. Liga	35	14	—		4	7	—		—		—		39	21
Kapfenberger SV	Total		64	23	—		5	7	—		—		—		69	30
LASK	2017–18	Austrian Bundesliga	20	7	—		0	0	—		0	0	—		20	7
LASK	2018–19	Austrian Bundesliga	27	13	—		5	6	—		2 (Note: Appearances in UEFA Europa League)	1	—		34	20
LASK	Total		47	20	—		5	6	—		2	1	—		64	27
Wolfsburg	2019–20	Bundesliga	32	2	—		2	0	—		7	3	—		41	5
Wolfsburg	2020–21	Bundesliga	21	1	—		4	3	—		2	0	—		27	4
Wolfsburg	Total		53	3	—		6	3	—		9	3	—		68	9
Al Jazira	2021–22	UAE Pro League	19	1	—		0	0	4	2	—		3 (Note: Appearances in FIFA Club World Cup and UAE Super Cup)	0	26	3
Botafogo	2022	Série A	27	2	0	0	1	0	—		—		—		28	2
Botafogo	2023	Série A	33	4	11	2	4	0	—		8 (Note: Appearances in Copa Sudamericana)	2	—		57	8
Botafogo	2024	Série A	0	0	8	0	0	0	—		1 (Note: Appearance in Copa Libertadores)	0	—		9	0
Botafogo	Total		60	6	19	2	5	0	—		9	2	—		94	10
Krasnodar	2023–24	Russian Premier League	12	1	—		1	0	—		—		—		13	1
Krasnodar	2024–25	Russian Premier League	25	3	—		3	0	—		—		1 (Note: Appearances in Russian Super Cup)	0	29	3
Krasnodar	2025–26	Russian Premier League	22	5	—		8	0	—		—		1	0	31	5
Krasnodar	Total		59	9	—		12	0	—		—		2	0	73	9
Career total			302	62	57	8	33	16	4	2	20	6	5	0	422	94

== Honours ==
=== Club ===
Krasnodar

- Russian Premier League: 2024–25

=== Individual ===
- Austrian Cup Top goalscorer: 2016–17, 2018–19
