= Olakunle Olusegun =

Nigerian footballer (born 2002)

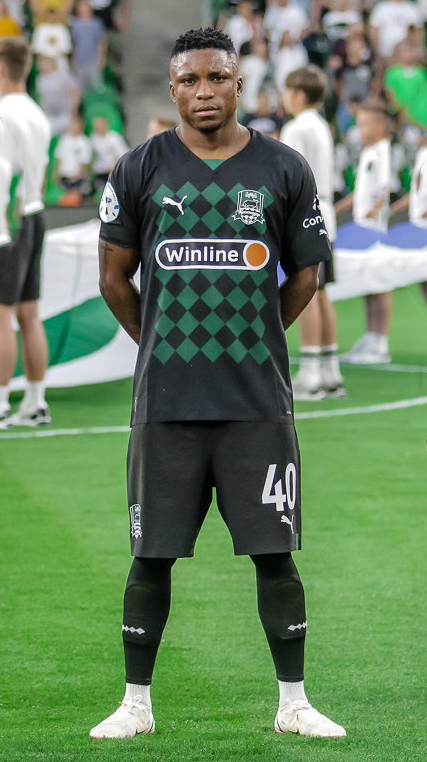
- Olusegun with Krasnodar in 2022

Personal information
- Full name: Olakunle Junior Olusegun
- Date of birth: 23 April 2002 (age 24)
- Place of birth: Ilorin, Nigeria
- Height: 1.67 m (5 ft 6 in)
- Position: Right-back

Team information
- Current team: Rostov
- Number: 6

Youth career
- –2020: ABS

Senior career*
Years	Team	Apps	(Gls)
2020	FDC Vista Gelendzhik		
2020–2021	Fremad Amager	34	(7)
2021–2022	Botev Plovdiv	0	(0)
2021–2022	→ Krasnodar-2 (loan)	19	(6)
2022	→ Krasnodar (loan)	9	(0)
2022–2026	Krasnodar	70	(10)
2025–2026	→ Pari Nizhny Novgorod (loan)	26	(5)
2026–	Rostov	15	(2)

International career^{‡}
2019	Nigeria U17	10	(3)
2025–	Nigeria	2	(0)
- * Club domestic league appearances and goals as of 20 November 2026 ‡ National team caps and goals as of 14 October 2025

Olakunle Junior Olusegun (born 23 April 2002) is a Nigerian professional footballer who plays as a right-back for Russian club Rostov and the Nigeria national team.

== Club career ==
In August 2021, Olusegun's rights were purchased by Bulgarian club Botev Plovdiv who immediately loaned him to Krasnodar-2 in Russia for the 2021–22 season.

He made his debut in the Russian Football National League for Krasnodar-2 on 29 August 2021 in a game against Baltika Kaliningrad.

In April 2022, Olusegun was promoted to the main squad of Krasnodar and made his Russian Premier League debut on 3 April 2022 in a game against Dynamo Moscow.

On 14 June 2022, Olusegun transferred to FC Krasnodar on a permanent basis and signed a four-year contract with the club. On 5 March 2024, Olusegun extended his contract with Krasnodar until 30 June 2028.

On 23 July 2025, Olusegun was loaned by Pari Nizhny Novgorod.

On 17 July 2026, Olusegun transferred to Rostov.

== International career ==
Olusegun represented Nigeria at the 2019 Africa U-17 Cup of Nations, where he scored a goal against Angola, and at the 2019 FIFA U-17 World Cup, where he scored in their Round of 16 1–3 loss to the Netherlands.

He made his debut for the senior national team on 6 June 2025 in a friendly against Russia.

== Career statistics ==
=== Club ===
As of match played 20 November 2026

Appearances and goals by club, season and competition
Club	Season	League			Cup (Note: Includes Danish Cup & Russian Cup)		Other		Total	
Club	Season	Division	Apps	Goals	Apps	Goals	Apps	Goals	Apps	Goals
Fremad Amager	2020–21	Danish 1st Division	31	7	3	2	—		34	9
Fremad Amager	2021–22	Danish 1st Division	3	0	0	0	—		3	0
Fremad Amager	Total		34	7	3	2	—		37	9
Krasnodar-2	2021–22	Russian First League	19	6	—		—		19	6
Krasnodar (loan)	2021–22	Russian Premier League	9	0	—		—		9	0
Krasnodar	2022–23	Russian Premier League	24	5	8	1	—		32	6
Krasnodar	2023–24	Russian Premier League	27	3	4	0	—		31	3
Krasnodar	2024–25	Russian Premier League	19	2	8	1	1 (Note: Appearance in Russian Super Cup)	0	28	3
Krasnodar	Total		70	10	20	2	1	0	91	12
Pari Nizhny Novgorod (loan)	2025–26	Russian Premier League	26	5	5	0	—		31	5
Rostov	2026–27	Russian Premier League	15	2	3	2	—		18	4
Career total			173	30	31	6	1	0	205	36

=== International ===
As of match played 14 October 2025

Appearances and goals by national team and year
National team	Year	Apps	Goals
Nigeria	2025	2	0
Total		2	0

== Honours ==
Krasnodar

- Russian Premier League: 2024–25
