= Kevin Pina (footballer) =

Cape Verdean footballer (born 1997)

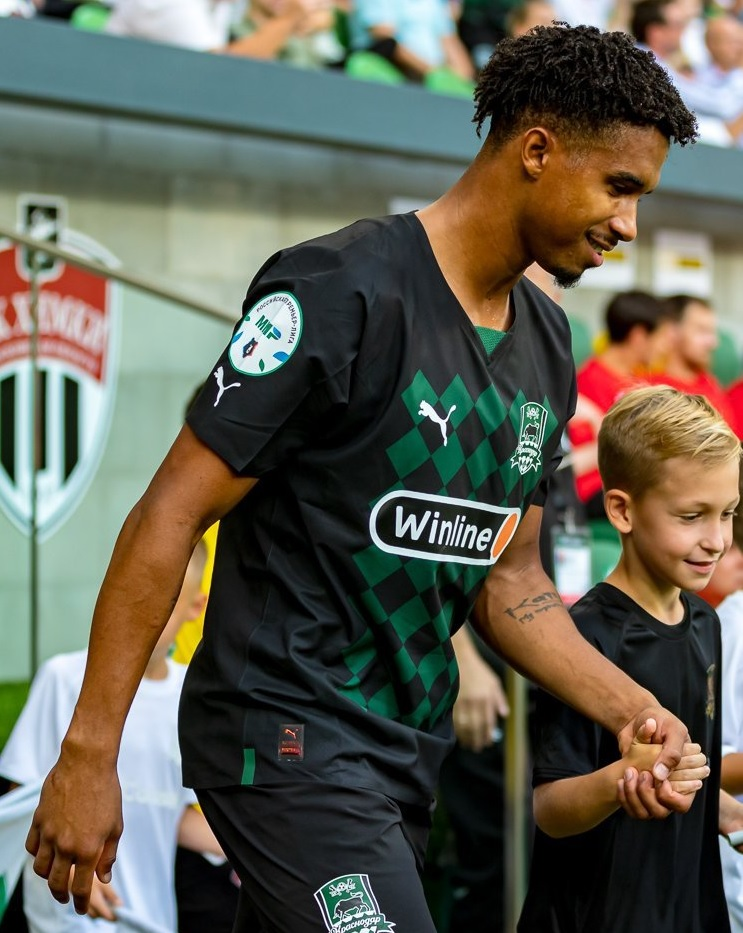
- Pina with Krasnodar in 2022

Personal information
- Full name: Kevin Lenini Gonçalves Pereira de Pina
- Date of birth: 27 January 1997 (age 29)
- Place of birth: Praia, Cape Verde
- Height: 1.81 m (5 ft 11 in)
- Position: Defensive midfielder

Team information
- Current team: Krasnodar
- Number: 6

Youth career
- Tchadense

Senior career*
Years	Team	Apps	(Gls)
2017–2019	Oliveirense	1	(0)
2018	→ Anadia (loan)	6	(0)
2018–2019	→ Sertanense (loan)	31	(2)
2019–2020	Chaves B	25	(2)
2020–2022	Chaves	39	(1)
2022–	Krasnodar	100	(6)

International career^{‡}
2019	Cape Verde U20	1	(0)
2022–	Cape Verde	38	(4)
- * Club domestic league appearances and goals as of 22 November 2026 ‡ National team caps and goals as of 17 November 2026

Kevin Lenini Gonçalves Pereira de Pina (Portuguese: [ˈkɛ.vin le.ˈni.ni ɡõ.ˈsal.vɨʃ pɨ.ˈɾej.ɾɐ dɨ ˈpi.nɐ]; born 27 January 1997) is a Cape Verdean professional footballer who plays as a defensive midfielder for Russian club Krasnodar and the Cape Verde national team.

== Club career ==
A youth product of the Cape Verdean team Tchadense, Pina made his professional debut with Oliveirense in a 3–2 LigaPro loss to Benfica B on 13 January 2018. He shortly after went on loan to Anadia and Sertanense, before transferring to Chaves in 2019.

On 8 September 2022, Pina signed a three-year contract with the Russian Premier League club Krasnodar. On 16 July 2024, he extended his contract to June 2027. On 29 July 2026, he extended it again to June 2029.

== International career ==
Pina was called up to represent the Cape Verde national team for 2022 FIFA World Cup qualification matches in September 2021. He debuted with Cape Verde in a 6–0 friendly win over Liechtenstein on 25 March 2022.

In December 2023, Pina was named in Cape Verde's squad for the 2023 Africa Cup of Nations in the Ivory Coast. He was in the starting line-up for Cape Verde's opening match against Ghana, as the Tubarões Azuis defeated the four-time African champions 2–1. In the team's second match, he scored the final goal of a 3–0 win over Mozambique which qualified Cape Verde for the knockout stage of the competition.

Pina was named in Cape Verde's squad for the 2026 FIFA World Cup, the country's first-ever participation in the tournament. He became the first player in Cape Verde's history to score at a FIFA World Cup, netting the nation's first-ever World Cup goal against Uruguay at the 2026 edition. He also earned the Man of the Match award for his performance.

== Career statistics ==
=== Club ===
As of match played 22 November 2026

Appearances and goals by club, season and competition
Club	Season	League			National cup (Note: Includes Taça de Portugal, Russian Cup)		Other		Total	
Club	Season	Division	Apps	Goals	Apps	Goals	Apps	Goals	Apps	Goals
Oliveirense	2017–18	Liga Portugal 2	1	0	0	0	1 (Note: Appearances in Taça da Liga)	0	2	0
Anadia	2017–18	Campeonato de Portugal	6	0	—		—		6	0
Sertanense	2018–19	Campeonato de Portugal	31	2	2	1	—		33	3
Chaves B	2019–20	Campeonato de Portugal	25	2	—		—		25	2
Chaves	2020–21	Liga Portugal 2	6	0	0	0	—		6	0
Chaves	2021–22	Liga Portugal 2	28	1	1	0	3 (Note: Two appearances in the promotion play-offs, one appearance in Taça da Liga)	0	32	1
Chaves	2022–23	Primeira Liga	5	0	—		—		5	0
Chaves	Total		39	1	1	0	3	0	43	1
Krasnodar	2022–23	Russian Premier League	15	1	9	0	—		24	1
Krasnodar	2023–24	Russian Premier League	15	1	5	0	—		20	1
Krasnodar	2024–25	Russian Premier League	29	3	4	1	1 (Note: Appearance in Russian Super Cup)	0	34	4
Krasnodar	2025–26	Russian Premier League	27	1	12	1	1	0	40	2
Krasnodar	2026–27	Russian Premier League	14	0	5	0	—		19	0
Krasnodar	Total		100	6	35	2	2	0	137	8
Career total			202	11	38	3	6	0	246	14

=== International ===
As of match played 17 November 2026

Appearances and goals by national team and year
National team	Year	Apps	Goals
Cape Verde	2022	2	0
Cape Verde	2023	3	1
Cape Verde	2024	16	1
Cape Verde	2025	7	0
Cape Verde	2026	10	2
Total		38	4

As of match played 21 June 2026. Cape Verde's score listed first, score column indicates score after each Pina goal.

List of international goals scored by Kevin Pina
No.	Date	Venue	Cap	Opponent	Score	Result	Competition
1	10 September 2023	Stade de Kégué, Lomé, Togo	5	Togo	1–0	2–3	2023 Africa Cup of Nations qualification
2	19 January 2024	Felix Houphouet Boigny Stadium, Abidjan, Ivory Coast	8	Mozambique	3–0	3–0	2023 Africa Cup of Nations
3	31 May 2026	Estádio do Restelo, Lisbon, Portugal	31	Serbia	1–0	3–0	Friendly
4	21 June 2026	Hard Rock Stadium, Miami Gardens, United States	33	Uruguay	1–0	2–2	2026 FIFA World Cup

== Honours ==
Krasnodar

- Russian Premier League: 2024–25
