= João Batxi =

Angolan international footballer (born 1998)

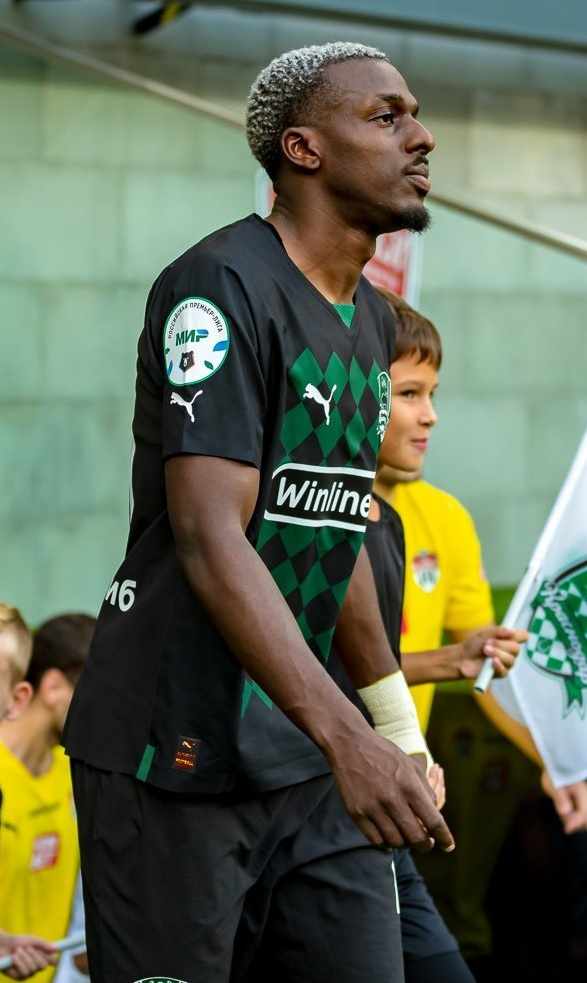
- Batxi with Krasnodar in 2022

Personal information
- Full name: João Pedro Fortes Bachiessa
- Date of birth: 1 May 1998 (age 28)
- Place of birth: Sintra, Portugal
- Height: 1.74 m (5 ft 9 in)
- Position: Winger

Team information
- Current team: Krasnodar
- Number: 11

Youth career
- –2007: Núcleo Sintra
- 2007–2011: Benfica
- 2011–2015: Real Massamá
- 2015–2016: Oriental
- 2016–2017: Tondela

Senior career*
Years	Team	Apps	(Gls)
2017–2019	Chaves B	44	(11)
2019–2022	Chaves	80	(13)
2022–	Krasnodar	118	(16)

International career^{‡}
2021–	Angola	3	(0)
- * Club domestic league appearances and goals as of 22 November 2026 ‡ National team caps and goals as of 29 March 2022

João Pedro Fortes Bachiessa (born 1 May 1998) known as João Batxi, is a footballer who plays for Russian Premier League club Krasnodar as a winger, mostly on the left. Born in Portugal, he plays for the Angola national team.

== Club career ==
He made his professional debut for Chaves on 16 November 2019 in the Taça da Liga.

On 7 September 2022, Batxi signed a three-year contract with the Russian Premier League club Krasnodar.

On 21 January 2024, Batxi extended his contract with Krasnodar to June 2027.

On 8 December 2025, Batxi extended his Krasnodar contract once more, to June 2029.

== International career ==
Born in Portugal, Batxi is of Angolan descent. He was called up to represent the Angola national football team for matches in September 2021. He debuted with Angola in a 1–0 2022 FIFA World Cup qualification loss to Egypt on 1 September 2021.

== Career statistics ==
=== Club ===
As of match played 22 November 2026

Appearances and goals by club, season and competition
Club	Season	League			National cup (Note: Includes Taça de Portugal, Russian Cup)		League cup (Note: Includes Taça da Liga)		Other		Total	
Club	Season	Division	Apps	Goals	Apps	Goals	Apps	Goals	Apps	Goals	Apps	Goals
Chaves B	2017–18	Divisão de Honra	11	9	—		—		—		11	9
Chaves B	2018–19	Campeonato de Portugal	29	2	3	0	—		—		32	2
Chaves B	2019–20	Campeonato de Portugal	4	0	—		—		—		4	0
Chaves B	Total		44	11	3	0	—		—		47	11
Chaves	2019–20	Liga Portugal 2	10	0	2	0	2	0	—		14	0
Chaves	2020–21	Liga Portugal 2	32	4	1	0	—		—		33	4
Chaves	2021–22	Liga Portugal 2	34	7	1	0	1	0	2 (Note: Appearances in Liga Portugal 2 promotion play-offs)	0	38	7
Chaves	2022–23	Primeira Liga	4	2	—		—		—		4	2
Chaves	Total		80	13	4	0	3	0	2	0	89	13
Krasnodar	2022–23	Russian Premier League	14	3	8	0	—		—		22	3
Krasnodar	2023–24	Russian Premier League	29	1	5	0	—		—		34	1
Krasnodar	2024–25	Russian Premier League	30	5	5	0	—		1 (Note: Appearance in Russian Super Cup)	0	36	5
Krasnodar	2025–26	Russian Premier League	30	2	13	4	—		1	0	44	6
Krasnodar	2026–27	Russian Premier League	15	5	5	0	—		—		20	5
Krasnodar	Total		118	16	36	4	—		2	0	156	20
Career total			242	40	43	4	3	0	4	0	292	44

== Honours ==
Krasnodar

- Russian Premier League: 2024–25
