= Stanislav Agkatsev =

Russian football player

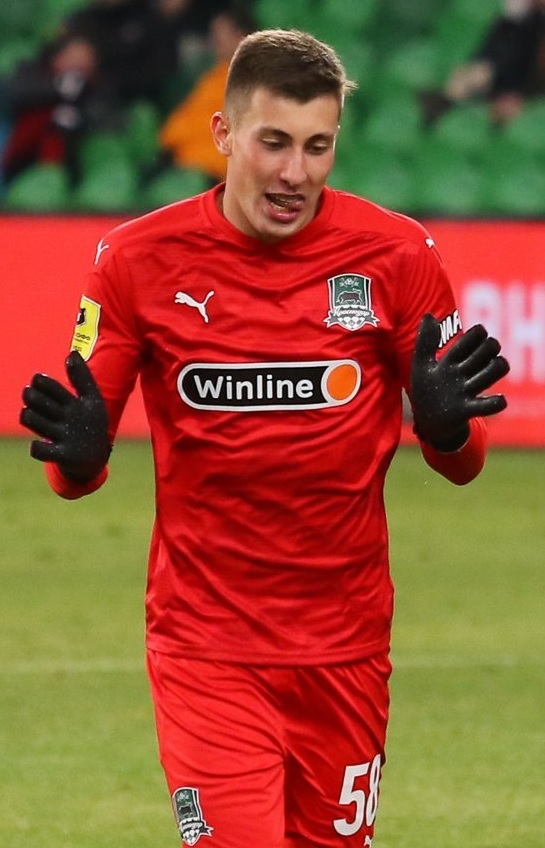
- Agkatsev with FC Krasnodar in 2021

Personal information
- Full name: Stanislav Vitalyevich Agkatsev
- Date of birth: 9 January 2002 (age 24)
- Place of birth: Vladikavkaz, Russia
- Height: 1.89 m (6 ft 2 in)
- Position: Goalkeeper

Team information
- Current team: Krasnodar
- Number: 1

Youth career
- –2015: Yunost Vladikavkaz
- 2015–2019: Krasnodar

Senior career*
| Years | Team | Apps | (Gls) |
| 2019–2021 | Krasnodar-3 | 2 | (0) |
| 2019–2023 | Krasnodar-2 | 51 | (0) |
| 2020– | Krasnodar | 84 | (0) |

International career^{‡}
| 2021 | Russia U21 | 4 | (0) |
| 2024– | Russia | 7 | (0) |
- * Club domestic league appearances and goals as of 22 November 2026 ‡ National team caps and goals as of 3 October 2026

Stanislav Vitalyevich Agkatsev (Russian: Станислав Витальевич Агкацев; born 9 January 2002) is a Russian football goalkeeper who plays for Krasnodar and the Russia national team.

== Club career ==
He made his debut in the Russian Professional Football League for Krasnodar-3 on 11 May 2019 in a game against Spartak Vladikavkaz.

He made his Russian Football National League debut for Krasnodar-2 on 31 August 2019 in a game against Shinnik Yaroslavl.

He made his debut for the main squad of Krasnodar on 25 February 2021 in a Europa League Round of 32 return leg against Dinamo Zagreb. The first-choice goalkeeper Matvey Safonov was injured at the time. He made his Russian Premier League debut for Krasnodar on 28 February 2021 in a game against Ural Yekaterinburg.

On 16 June 2024, Agkatsev extended his contract with Krasnodar until the end of the 2028–29 season.

Agkatsev became Krasnodar's starting goalkeeper in the 2024–25 season, following the transfer of Matvey Safonov to Paris Saint-Germain.

In April 2025, Agkatsev was named as the fourth best goalkeeper in the world, according to data from the CIES Football Observatory Index.

On 25 April 2025, Agkatsev saved a penalty kick in the 11th minute of added time to preserve Krasnodar's 3–2 victory over Dynamo Makhachkala and Krasnodar's lead in the Russian Premier League table, while also breaking the little finger on his hand in his dive for the ball. He commented after the game "you can only win a championship by breaking your fingers". On 24 May 2025, Krasnodar won the Russian Premier League title for the first time in club's history, with one-point lead over second-placed Zenit St. Petersburg.

== International career ==
Agkatsev was first called up to the Russia national football team for a training camp in September 2023.

He made his debut on 15 November 2024 in a friendly against Brunei.

== Career statistics ==
As of match played 22 November 2026

Appearances and goals by club, season and competition
| Club | Season | League | | | Cup | | Continental | | Other | | Total | |
| Club | Season | Division | Apps | Goals | Apps | Goals | Apps | Goals | Apps | Goals | Apps | Goals |
|---|---|---|---|---|---|---|---|---|---|---|---|---|
| Krasnodar-3 | 2018–19 | Russian Second League | 1 | 0 | — | | — | | — | | 1 | 0 |
| Krasnodar-3 | 2019–20 | Russian Second League | 0 | 0 | — | | — | | — | | 0 | 0 |
| Krasnodar-3 | 2020–21 | Russian Second League | 1 | 0 | — | | — | | — | | 1 | 0 |
| Krasnodar-3 | Total | | 2 | 0 | — | | — | | — | | 2 | 0 |
| Krasnodar-2 | 2018–19 | Russian First League | 0 | 0 | — | | — | | — | | 0 | 0 |
| Krasnodar-2 | 2019–20 | Russian First League | 8 | 0 | — | | — | | — | | 8 | 0 |
| Krasnodar-2 | 2020–21 | Russian First League | 19 | 0 | — | | — | | — | | 19 | 0 |
| Krasnodar-2 | 2021–22 | Russian First League | 15 | 0 | — | | — | | — | | 15 | 0 |
| Krasnodar-2 | 2022–23 | Russian First League | 9 | 0 | — | | — | | — | | 9 | 0 |
| Krasnodar-2 | Total | | 51 | 0 | — | | — | | — | | 51 | 0 |
| Krasnodar | 2019–20 | Russian Premier League | 0 | 0 | 0 | 0 | 0 | 0 | — | | 0 | 0 |
| Krasnodar | 2020–21 | Russian Premier League | 2 | 0 | 0 | 0 | 1 (Note: Appearance in UEFA Europa League) | 0 | — | | 3 | 0 |
| Krasnodar | 2021–22 | Russian Premier League | 3 | 0 | 2 | 0 | — | | — | | 5 | 0 |
| Krasnodar | 2022–23 | Russian Premier League | 3 | 0 | 5 | 0 | — | | — | | 8 | 0 |
| Krasnodar | 2023–24 | Russian Premier League | 1 | 0 | 7 | 0 | — | | — | | 8 | 0 |
| Krasnodar | 2024–25 | Russian Premier League | 30 | 0 | 3 | 0 | — | | 1 (Note: Appearances in Russian Super Cup) | 0 | 34 | 0 |
| Krasnodar | 2025–26 | Russian Premier League | 30 | 0 | 6 | 0 | — | | 1 | 0 | 37 | 0 |
| Krasnodar | 2026–27 | Russian Premier League | 15 | 0 | 0 | 0 | — | | — | | 15 | 0 |
| Krasnodar | Total | | 84 | 0 | 23 | 0 | 1 | 0 | 2 | 0 | 110 | 0 |
| Career total | | | 137 | 0 | 23 | 0 | 1 | 0 | 2 | 0 | 163 | 0 |

=== International ===
As of match played 3 October 2026

Appearances and goals by national team and year
| National team | Year | Apps | Goals |
|---|---|---|---|
| Russia | 2024 | 1 | 0 |
| Russia | 2025 | 3 | 0 |
| Russia | 2026 | 3 | 0 |
| Total | | 7 | 0 |

== Honours ==
Krasnodar

- Russian Premier League: 2024–25

Individual

- Russian Premier League Goalkeeper of the Year: 2025–26
