= Moses Cobnan =

Nigerian footballer

Personal information
- Full name: Moses David Cobnan
- Date of birth: 10 September 2002 (age 24)
- Place of birth: Jos, Nigeria
- Height: 1.78 m (5 ft 10 in)
- Position: Forward

Team information
- Current team: Levadiakos (on loan from Krasnodar)
- Number: 99

Senior career*
Years	Team	Apps	(Gls)
–2021	Obazz FC		
2021–2022	Sereď	9	(1)
2021–2022	→ Slovan Duslo Šaľa (loan)		
2022	Železiarne Podbrezová	18	(9)
2023–	Krasnodar	55	(6)
2026–	→ Levadiakos (loan)	5	(0)
- * Club domestic league appearances and goals as of 20 September 2026

Moses David Cobnan (born 10 September 2002) is a Nigerian professional footballer who plays as a centre-forward or right winger for Super League Greece club Levadiakos on loan from Russian club Krasnodar.

== Club career ==
=== ŠKF Sereď ===
Cobnan made his professional Fortuna Liga debut for Sereď against Senica on 11 September 2021.

=== Krasnodar ===
On 5 January 2023, Russian Premier League club Krasnodar announced the signing of Cobnan to a contract lasting until June 2026. The contract was signed on 15 January 2023.

On 18 May 2024, Cobnan appeared as a substitute in the 82nd minute of the penultimate 2023–24 Russian Premier League Krasnodar game against Sochi, with Krasnodar down 2–1. In the 85th minute, Krasnodar converted a penalty kick that was awarded for a foul against Cobnan, and then Cobnan scored the winning goal in added time (his first league goal for Krasnodar), keeping the club in the title race. On 18 August 2024, he came off the bench with 20 minutes left and scored twice to secure a 2–1 comeback victory over Pari Nizhny Novgorod.

On 19 August 2024, Cobnan extended his contract with Krasnodar to June 2028.

On 31 July 2026, Cobnan was loaned to Levadiakos in Greece.

== Career statistics ==
As of match played 24 May 2026

Appearances and goals by club, season and competition
Club	Season	League			Cup		Other		Total	
Club	Season	Division	Apps	Goals	Apps	Goals	Apps	Goals	Apps	Goals
Sered	2021–22	Slovak First Football League	9	1	0	0	—		9	1
Železiarne Podbrezová	2022–23	Slovak First Football League	18	9	3	5	—		21	14
Krasnodar	2022–23	Russian Premier League	10	0	6	1	—		16	1
Krasnodar	2023–24	Russian Premier League	10	1	6	1	—		16	2
Krasnodar	2024–25	Russian Premier League	25	4	8	0	1 (Note: Appearances in Russian Super Cup)	0	34	4
Krasnodar	2025–26	Russian Premier League	10	1	5	1	1	0	16	2
Krasnodar	Total		55	6	25	3	2	0	82	9
Career total			82	16	28	8	2	0	112	24

== Honours ==
Krasnodar

- Russian Premier League: 2024–25
