= 2020–21 FC Krasnodar season =

FC Krasnodar
2020–21 season
- Chairman: Sergey Galitsky
- Manager: Murad Musayev (until 3 April); Viktor Goncharenko (from 3 April)
- Stadium: Krasnodar Stadium
- Premier League: 10th
- Russian Cup: Round of 16
- Champions League: Group stage
- Europa League: Round of 32
- Top goalscorer: League: Marcus Berg (9); All: Marcus Berg (12)
- Highest home attendance: 17,590 vs Zenit St.Petersburg (17 April 2021) vs Sochi (1 May 2021)
- Lowest home attendance: 0 vs PAOK (22 September 2020) vs Sevilla (24 November 2020)
- Average home league attendance: 8,926 (1 May 2021)
Home colours	Away colours	Third colours

The 2020–21 FC Krasnodar season was the tenth successive season that Krasnodar played in the Russian Premier League, the highest tier of association football in Russia. They finished the previous season in 3rd place, qualifying for the UEFA Champions League for the second time, entering at the third qualifying round. They also took part in the Russian Cup. Krasnodar finished the season in 10th position, were knocked out of the Russian Cup at the Round of 16 stage by Sochi, finished third in their UEFA Champions League group before being knocked out of the UEFA Europa League by Dinamo Zagreb at the Round of 32.

== Season events ==
On 29 July 2020, Igor Smolnikov re-signed for Krasnodar on a two-year contract after leaving Zenit St.Petersburg. On 5 August, Krasnodar announced that Yevgeni Gorodov had returned to the club on a two-year contract, having previously played for Krasnodar between 2011 and 2013.

On 13 September, Krasnodar's away game against Rotor Volgograd was postponed due to 10 cases of COVID-19 within the Rotor squad. Three days later, Krasnodar were awarded a 3–0 technical victory over Rotor Volgograd.

On 15 September, Uroš Spajić was loaned to Feyenoord for the remainder of the season.

On 6 October, Krasnodar announced the signing of Yevgeni Chernov from Rostov on a contract until the end of the 2023/24 season, and the signing of Yevgeni Markov from Dynamo Moscow on a contract until the summer of 2022. On 15 October, Krasnodar signed Aleksei Ionov from Rostov on a contract until the summer of 2023.

On 12 January, Krasnodar announced the signing of Igor Andreyev from Nosta Novotroitsk to Krasnodar-2.

On 12 February, Krasnodar announced the loan signing of Ambroise Oyongo from Montpellier until the end of the season.

On 25 February, Krasnodar signed Yegor Baburin on loan from Rostov, whilst Denis Adamov left the club to join Sochi.

Following Krasnodar's 0–5 defeat to Akhmat Grozny on 3 April, head coach Murad Musayev resigned from his position. On 5 April, Krasnodar announced the appointment of Viktor Goncharenko as their new head coach on a contract until the summer of 2023.

== Squad ==
As of match played 16 May 2021

Number	Name	Nationality	Position	Date of birth (age)	Signed from	Signed in	Contract ends	Apps.	Goals
Goalkeepers
1	Yevgeni Gorodov	(Russia)	GK	13 December 1985 (aged 35)	Akhmat Grozny	2020	2022	34	0
12	Yegor Baburin	(Russia)	GK	9 August 1993 (aged 27)	loan from Rostov	2021	2021	2	0
39	Matvei Safonov	(Russia)	GK	25 February 1999 (aged 22)	Academy	2016		83	0
58	Stanislav Agkatsev	(Russia)	GK	9 January 2002 (aged 19)	Academy	2018		3	0
Defenders
2	Yegor Sorokin	(Russia)	DF	4 November 1995 (aged 25)	Rubin Kazan	2019	2024	28	0
3	Ambroise Oyongo	(Cameroon)	DF	22 June 1991 (aged 29)	loan from Montpellier	2021	2021	1	0
4	Alyaksandr Martynovich	(Belarus)	DF	26 August 1987 (aged 33)	Dinamo Minsk	2010		261	5
6	Cristian Ramírez	(Ecuador)	DF	12 August 1994 (aged 26)	Ferencvárosi	2017		135	1
17	German Osnov	(Russia)	DF	9 August 1993 (aged 27)	Lokomotiv Moscow	2021		0	0
18	Yevgeni Chernov	(Russia)	DF	23 October 1992 (aged 28)	Rostov	2020	2024	26	0
28	Igor Smolnikov	(Russia)	DF	8 August 1988 (aged 32)	Zenit St.Petersburg	2020	2022	63	0
44	Sergei Borodin	(Russia)	DF	30 January 1999 (aged 22)	Academy	2015		0	0
46	Vitali Stezhko	(Russia)	DF	29 January 1997 (aged 24)	Academy	2014		0	0
84	Vyacheslav Litvinov	(Russia)	DF	1 April 2001 (aged 20)	Academy	2018		2	0
86	Daniil Kornyushin	(Russia)	DF	8 October 2001 (aged 19)	Academy	2018		0	0
98	Sergei Petrov	(Russia)	DF	2 January 1991 (aged 30)	Krylia Sovetov	2013		231	14
Midfielders
7	Rémy Cabella	(France)	MF	8 March 1990 (aged 31)	AS Saint-Étienne	2019		44	13
8	Yury Gazinsky	(Russia)	MF	20 July 1989 (aged 31)	Torpedo Moscow	2013		265	13
10	Wanderson	(Brazil)	MF	7 October 1994 (aged 26)	Red Bull Salzburg	2017		130	16
11	Aleksei Ionov	(Russia)	MF	18 February 1989 (aged 32)	Rostov	2020	2023	22	4
14	Kristoffer Olsson	(Sweden)	MF	30 June 1995 (aged 25)	AIK	2019		80	4
15	Aleks Matsukatov	(Russia)	MF	1 November 1999 (aged 21)	Academy	2019		8	0
16	Viktor Claesson	(Sweden)	MF	2 January 1992 (aged 29)	IF Elfsborg	2017	2021	127	40
31	Kaio	(Brazil)	MF	18 September 1995 (aged 25)	Santa Clara	2019	2024	46	1
47	Daniil Utkin	(Russia)	MF	12 October 1999 (aged 21)	Academy	2018		64	7
52	Tonny Vilhena	(Netherlands)	MF	3 January 1995 (aged 26)	Feyenoord	2019		64	7
53	Alexander Chernikov	(Russia)	MF	1 February 2000 (aged 21)	Academy	2019		8	0
74	Eduard Spertsyan	(Armenia)	MF	7 June 2000 (aged 20)	Academy	2018		7	0
77	Ruslan Kambolov	(Russia)	MF	1 January 1990 (aged 31)	Rubin Kazan	2019	2021	38	0
89	Dmitry Stotsky	(Russia)	MF	1 December 1989 (aged 31)	Ufa	2018	2022	60	2
	Andrei Tekuchyov	(Russia)	MF	5 July 1999 (aged 21)	Academy	2016		0	0
Forwards
9	Ari	(Russia)	FW	11 December 1985 (aged 35)	Spartak Moscow	2013		172	54
20	Yevgeni Markov	(Russia)	FW	7 July 1994 (aged 26)	Dynamo Moscow	2020	2022	8	0
33	Marcus Berg	(Sweden)	FW	17 August 1986 (aged 34)	Al Ain	2019	2020	63	22
37	Ilya Vorotnikov	(Russia)	FW	11 February 2001 (aged 20)	Academy	2017		1	0
63	Nikita Sergeyev	(Russia)	FW	17 October 1999 (aged 21)	Academy	2016		4	0
67	Maksim Kutovoy	(Russia)	FW	1 July 2001 (aged 19)	Academy	2019		10	0
81	Leon Sabua	(Russia)	FW	1 September 2000 (aged 20)	Academy	2016		4	1
93	Magomed-Shapi Suleymanov	(Russia)	FW	16 December 1999 (aged 21)	Academy	2015		114	23
96	Ruslan Rzayev	(Russia)	FW	24 January 1998 (aged 23)	Academy	2015		0	0
	Igor Andreyev	(Russia)	FW	15 August 2001 (aged 19)	Nosta Novotroitsk	2021	2025	0	0
Away on loan
5	Uroš Spajić	(Serbia)	DF	13 February 1993 (aged 28)	Anderlecht	2018	2023	65	1
20	Ilya Zhigulyov	(Russia)	MF	1 February 1996 (aged 25)	Academy	2012		23	0
21	Younes Namli	(Denmark)	MF	20 June 1994 (aged 26)	PEC Zwolle	2019	2023	18	1
60	German Onugkha	(Russia)	FW	6 July 1996 (aged 24)	Volgar Astrakhan	2018	2022	3	0
61	Ilya Martynov	(Russia)	DF	25 January 2000 (aged 21)	Academy	2016		0	0
	Leo Goglichidze	(Russia)	DF	29 April 1997 (aged 24)	Chayka Peschanokopskoye	2021		0	0
Players who left during the season
13	Aleksei Gritsayenko	(Russia)	DF	25 May 1995 (aged 25)	Luch Vladivostok	2017		11	1
66	Denis Adamov	(Russia)	GK	20 February 1998 (aged 23)	Academy	2014		2	0
87	Anatoli Katrich	(Russia)	FW	9 July 1994 (aged 26)	Luch Vladivostok	2020		1	0
88	Andrei Sinitsyn	(Russia)	GK	23 June 1988 (aged 32)	Yenisey Krasnoyarsk	2012		103	0
	Roman Kurazhov	(Russia)	MF	28 July 1999 (aged 21)	Academy	2016		0	0

=== Out on loan ===
Note: Flags indicate national team as defined under FIFA eligibility rules; some limited exceptions apply. Players may hold more than one non-FIFA nationality.

No.	Pos.	Nation	Player
—	DF	RUS	Leo Goglichidze (at Nizhny Novgorod until 30 June 2021)
—	DF	RUS	Ilya Martynov (at Tambov until 30 June 2021)
—	DF	RUS	Igor Paradin (at Chayka Peschanokopskoye until 30 June 2021)
—	DF	SRB	Uroš Spajić (at Feyenoord until 31 May 2021)

No.	Pos.	Nation	Player
—	DF	RUS	Yevgeni Nazarov (at SKA-Khabarovsk until 30 June 2021)
—	MF	DEN	Younes Namli (at Colorado Rapids until 31 December 2021)
—	MF	RUS	Ilya Zhigulyov (at Rotor Volgograd until 31 May 2021)

== Transfers ==
=== In ===
Date	Position	Nationality	Name	From	Fee	Ref.
29 July 2020	DF	(Russia)	Igor Smolnikov	Zenit St.Petersburg	Free	
5 August 2020	GK	(Russia)	Yevgeni Gorodov	Akhmat Grozny	Free	
6 October 2020	DF	(Russia)	Yevgeni Chernov	Rostov	Undisclosed	
6 October 2020	FW	(Russia)	Yevgeni Markov	Dynamo Moscow	Undisclosed	
15 October 2020	MF	(Russia)	Aleksei Ionov	Rostov	Undisclosed	
12 January 2021	FW	(Russia)	Igor Andreyev	Nosta Novotroitsk	Undisclosed	

=== Loans in ===
Date from	Position	Nationality	Name	From	Date to	Ref.
22 February 2021	DF	(Cameroon)	Ambroise Oyongo	Montpellier	End of season	
25 February 2021	GK	(Russia)	Yegor Baburin	Rostov	End of season	

=== Out ===
Date	Position	Nationality	Name	To	Fee	Ref.
23 July 2020	DF	(Russia)	Artyom Golubev	Ufa	Undisclosed	
4 September 2020	MF	(Russia)	Roman Kurazhov	Dynamo Stavropol	Undisclosed	
25 February 2021	GK	(Russia)	Denis Adamov	Sochi	Undisclosed	

=== Loans out ===
Date from	Position	Nationality	Name	To	Date to	Ref.
1 July 2020	DF	(Russia)	Yevgeni Nazarov	Teplice	31 December 2020	
20 July 2020	MF	(Russia)	Andrei Tekuchyov	Tom Tomsk	End of season	
4 August 2020	MF	(Russia)	Ilya Zhigulyov	Rotor Volgograd	End of season	
11 August 2020	FW	(Russia)	German Onugkha	Tambov	26 January 2021	
15 September 2020	DF	(Serbia)	Uroš Spajić	Feyenoord	End of season	
13 January 2021	DF	(Russia)	Leo Goglichidze	Nizhny Novgorod	End of season	
1 February 2021	FW	(Russia)	German Onugkha	Vejle	End of season	
15 February 2020	DF	(Russia)	Yevgeni Nazarov	Feyenoord	30 June 2021	

=== Released ===
Date	Position	Nationality	Name	Joined	Date	Ref.
10 August 2020	DF	(Russia)	Aleksei Gritsayenko	Tambov	10 August 2020	
11 January 2021	MF	(Russia)	Anatoli Katrich	Tekstilshchik Ivanovo	23 January 2021	
13 January 2021	GK	(Russia)	Andrei Sinitsyn			
31 May 2021	GK	(Russia)	Nikita Yegyazarov			
31 May 2021	DF	(Russia)	Nikolai Bochko	SKA Rostov-on-Don		
31 May 2021	DF	(Russia)	Daur Chanba			
31 May 2021	DF	(Russia)	Maksim Demenko	Biolog-Novokubansk		
31 May 2021	DF	(Russia)	Kirill Fomenko	Zvezda St.Petersburg		
31 May 2021	DF	(Russia)	Andrei Ivashin			
31 May 2021	DF	(Russia)	Siyovush Khabibulloyev			
31 May 2021	DF	(Russia)	Stepan Nikitin	Mashuk-KMV Pyatigorsk		
31 May 2021	DF	(Russia)	German Osnov	Chayka Peschanokopskoye		
31 May 2021	DF	(Russia)	Daniil Punegov	Mashuk-KMV Pyatigorsk		
31 May 2021	DF	(Russia)	Vitali Stezhko			
31 May 2021	MF	(Russia)	Akim Abdokov	Chernomorets Novorossiysk		
31 May 2021	MF	(Russia)	Stanislav Basyrov			
31 May 2021	MF	(Russia)	Levon Bayramyan	Alashkert		
31 May 2021	MF	(Russia)	Danil Benedyk			
31 May 2021	MF	(Russia)	Valeri Fomenko	Vista Gelendzhik		
31 May 2021	MF	(Russia)	Ruslan Kambolov			
31 May 2021	MF	(Russia)	Dmitri Kotov	Dynamo Vladivostok		
31 May 2021	MF	(Russia)	Fyodor Makarenko			
31 May 2021	MF	(Russia)	Minkail Matsuyev			
31 May 2021	MF	(Russia)	Sergei Peterson	Zenit-Izhevsk		
31 May 2021	MF	(Russia)	Andrei Tekuchyov	Shinnik Yaroslavl		
31 May 2021	FW	(Russia)	Ari			
31 May 2021	FW	(Russia)	Arutyun Grigoryan			
31 May 2021	FW	(Russia)	Yevgeni Markov	Arsenal Tula	9 June 2021	
31 May 2021	FW	(Russia)	Shamil Mavlyanov	Mashuk-KMV Pyatigorsk		
31 May 2021	FW	(Russia)	Nikita Shershnyov			
31 May 2021	FW	(Russia)	Roman Simonov	Zenit-Izhevsk		
31 May 2021	FW	(Russia)	Ruslan Rzayev			
31 May 2021	FW	(Sweden)	Marcus Berg	IFK Göteborg	1 June 2021	

== Friendlies ==
21 January 2021	Legia Warsaw (Poland)	0 – 0	(Russia) Krasnodar	Dubai, United Arab Emirates
16:00 MSK (UTC+3)		Report		Stadium: Nad Al Sheba Stadium; Referee: M.Ocenas

27 January 2021	Riga (Latvia)	0 – 1	(Russia) Krasnodar	Dubai, United Arab Emirates
14:30 MSK (UTC+3)	Rugins (yellow card) 23'; Milošević (yellow card) 27'; M.Vranjanin (yellow card) 44'; Mbombo (yellow card) 79'; M.Fall (yellow card) 89'	Report	Suleymanov (red card) 23'; Spertsyan 38' (pen.); Markov (yellow card) 44'	Stadium: Nad Al Sheba Stadium; Referee: V.Peter

27 January 2021	Shakhtyor Soligorsk (Belarus)	3 – 0	(Russia) Krasnodar	Dubai, United Arab Emirates
16:30 MSK (UTC+3)	Cabella 43'; Claesson 49'; Suleymanov (red card) 78'; Sabua 90+1' (pen.)	Report	Szöke (yellow card) 72'; Begunov (yellow card) 90+1'	Stadium: Nad Al Sheba Stadium; Referee: M.Ocenas

4 February 2021	Krasnodar	1 – 1	Lokomotiv Moscow	Marbella, Spain
16:00 MSK (UTC+3)	Khalnazarov 11'; Kambolov (yellow card) 39'; Grigoryan (yellow card) 60'	Report	Magkeyev (yellow card) 22'; Ageyev 74'	Stadium: Marbella Football Centre; Referee: Hernandez

4 February 2021	Krasnodar	2 – 0	Rostov	Marbella, Spain
18:30 MSK (UTC+3)	Vilhena (yellow card) 45'; Suleymanov 61', 68'	Report	Bayramyan (yellow card) 45'	Stadium: Marbella Football Centre; Referee: E. Jaramillo

11 February 2021	Krasnodar	0 – 4	Lokomotiv Moscow	Marbella, Spain
16:30 MSK (UTC+3)		Report	Zhemaletdinov 3'; Lisakovich 14'; Krychowiak (yellow card) 27'; Kamano (yellow card) 28'; Ignatyev 32', 41'	Stadium: Marbella Football Centre; Referee: Hernandez

11 February 2021	Krasnodar (Russia)	3 – 2	(Georgia (country)) Locomotive Tbilisi	Marbella, Spain
18:30 MSK (UTC+3)	Kambolov 14'; Kutovoy 16'; Suleymanov 34' (pen.)	Report	Sikharulidze 17'; Shonia (yellow card) 36' (goal) 69'; A.Andronikashvili (yellow card) 78'	Stadium: Marbella Football Centre; Referee: E. Vasquez

== Competitions ==
=== Overview ===
Competition	First match	Last match	Starting round	Final position	Record							
Competition	First match	Last match	Starting round	Final position	Pld	W	D	L	GF	GA	GD	Win %
Premier League	9 August 2020	16 May 2021	Matchday 1	10th	30	12	5	13	52	45	+7	40.00
Russian Cup	21 February 2021	21 February 2021	Round of 16	Round of 16	1	0	0	1	1	2	−1	0.00
Champions League	22 September 2020	8 December 2020	Play-off round	Group stage	8	3	2	3	10	13	−3	37.50
Europa League	18 February 2021	25 February 2021	Round of 32	Round of 32	2	0	0	2	2	4	−2	0.00
Total					41	15	7	19	65	64	+1	36.59

Last updated: 16 May 2021
Source: Competitions

=== Premier League ===
==== League table ====
Pos	Team	Pld	W	D	L	GF	GA	GD	Pts
8	Khimki	30	13	6	11	35	39	−4	45
9	Rostov	30	13	4	13	37	35	+2	43
10	Krasnodar	30	12	5	13	52	45	+7	41
11	Akhmat Grozny	30	11	7	12	36	38	−2	40
12	Ural Yekaterinburg	30	7	13	10	26	36	−10	34

Source: Premier Liga
Rules for classification: 1) Points; 2) Head-to-head points; 3) Head-to-head matches won; 4) Head-to-head goal difference; 5) Head-to-head goals scored; 6) Matches won; 7) Goal difference; 8) Goals scored; 9) Play-off.

==== Results summary ====
Overall								Home						Away					
Pld	W	D	L	GF	GA	GD	Pts	W	D	L	GF	GA	GD	W	D	L	GF	GA	GD
30	12	5	13	52	45	+7	41	7	4	4	34	23	+11	5	1	9	18	22	−4

Last updated: 16 May 2021.
Source: See Results

==== Results by round ====
Round	1	2	3	4	5	6	7	8	9	10	11	12	13	14	15	16	17	18	19	20	21	22	23	24	25	26	27	28	29	30
Ground	A	A	H	A	H	H	A	H	A	A	H	A	A	A	H	A	H	H	H	H	A	H	H	H	A	H	A	H	A	A
Result	W	L	W	L	D	D	W	W	D	L	W	L	L	L	W	L	W	W	W	D	L	W	L	L	L	D	W	L	L	W
Position	1	6	4	7	10	9	7	5	7	8	7	8	10	10	9	10	9	8	7	8	9	8	10	10	10	11	10	10	11	10

Updated to match(es) played on 16 May 2021. Source: Premier Liga
A = Away; H = Home; W = Win; D = Draw; L = Loss

==== Results ====
9 August 2020 1	Ufa	0–3	Krasnodar	Ufa
17:00 MSK (UTC+3)	Bezdenezhnykh (yellow card) 42'; Jokić (yellow card) 67'	Report	Petrov (yellow card) 34'; Olsson (yellow card) 51'; Cabella 53', 63'; Berg 65'	Stadium: Neftyanik Stadium; Attendance: 1,215; Referee: Sergei Karasev

15 August 2020 2	Lokomotiv Moscow	1–0	Krasnodar	Moscow
19:00 MSK (UTC+3)	Al.Miranchuk 43'; Guilherme (yellow card) 85'	Report	Ramírez (yellow card) 9'	Stadium: RZD Arena; Attendance: 6,247; Referee: Kirill Levnikov

18 August 2020 3	Krasnodar	2–0	Arsenal Tula	Krasnodar
20:00 MSK (UTC+3)	Utkin (yellow card) 27'; Petrov 35' (yellow card) 62'; Berg (yellow card) 64' (goal) 66'; Olsson (yellow card) 74'	Report	Denisov (yellow card) 16'; Bauer (yellow card) 37'; Čaušić (yellow card) 54'	Stadium: Krasnodar Stadium; Attendance: 3,518; Referee: Sergey Ivanov

22 August 2020 4	Ural Yekaterinburg	1–0	Krasnodar	Yekaterinburg
14:00 MSK (UTC+3)	Podberyozkin 3'; Yefremov (yellow card) 86'; Pomazun (yellow card) 90+'	Report	Kaio (yellow card) 23' (yellow-red card) 54'; Utkin (yellow card) 57'; Olsson (yellow card) 57'; Claesson (yellow card) 61'; Gazinsky (yellow card) 69'	Stadium: Central Stadium; Attendance: 5,816; Referee: Evgeny Turbin

26 August 2020 5	Krasnodar	1–1	CSKA Moscow	Krasnodar
20:30 MSK (UTC+3)	Berg (yellow card) 26'; Ramírez (yellow card) 78'; Wanderson 80'	Report	Kuchayev 28'; Maradishvili (yellow card) 53'; Tiknizyan (yellow card) 90+1'	Stadium: Krasnodar Stadium; Attendance: 6,077; Referee: Vladislav Bezborodov

30 August 2020 6	Krasnodar	1–1	Rostov	Krasnodar
20:00 MSK (UTC+3)	Petrov (yellow card) 27'; Martynovich (yellow card) 63'; Berg 72'	Report	Eremenko (yellow card) 27'; Normann 64'; Toshevski (yellow card) 90'	Stadium: Krasnodar Stadium; Attendance: 9,136; Referee: Sergei Karasev

13 September 2020 7	Rotor Volgograd	0–3	Krasnodar	Volgograd
19:00 MSK (UTC+3)		Report		Stadium: Volgograd Arena
Note: Match postponed on 13 September due to 10 cases of COVID-19 within the Rotor squad. Krasnodar awarded a 3–0 technical victory on 16 September.

18 September 2020 8	Krasnodar	7–2	Khimki	Krasnodar
20:00 MSK (UTC+3)	Berg (penalty missed) 19' 19'; Claesson 23', 45'; Vilhena 52'; Cabella 62'; Utkin 74'; Suleymanov 89'	Report	Tikhiy (yellow card) 18'; Koryan 27', 42' (pen.)	Stadium: Krasnodar Stadium; Attendance: 10,554; Referee: Sergey Lapochkin

26 September 2020 9	Sochi	1–1	Krasnodar	Sochi
20:00 MSK (UTC+3)	Noboa 4' (pen.) (yellow card) 47'; Zabolotny (yellow card) 27'; Yusupov (yellow card) 45+'; Zaika (yellow card) 53' (yellow-red card) 55'; Terekhov (yellow card) 85'	Report	Petrov (yellow card) 4' (goal) 59'; Olsson (yellow card) 17'; Smolnikov (yellow card) 89'	Stadium: Fisht Olympic Stadium; Attendance: 7,641; Referee: Sergei Karasev

4 October 2020 10	Dynamo Moscow	2–0	Krasnodar	Moscow
20:00 MSK (UTC+3)	N'Jie (yellow card) 6'; Grulyov 37'; Parshivlyuk (yellow card) 41'; Szymański (yellow card) 45+'; Lesovoy 57' (yellow card) 75'	Report	Smolnikov (yellow card) 47'; Kaio (yellow card) 66'; Gazinsky (yellow card) 74'	Stadium: VTB Arena; Attendance: 6,076; Referee: Kirill Levnikov

17 October 2020 11	Krasnodar	3–1	Rubin Kazan	Krasnodar
18:30 MSK (UTC+3)	Cabella 45+' (pen.); Olsson 52'; Smolnikov (yellow card) 56'; Berg 90+'; Kaio (yellow card) 90+'	Report	Despotović (yellow card) 45+'; Abildgaard (yellow card) 55'; Shatov (yellow card) 87'; Makarov (yellow card) 90'; Starfelt 90+'	Stadium: Krasnodar Stadium; Attendance: 10,554; Referee: Mikhail Vilkov

24 October 2020 12	Krasnodar	1–3	Spartak Moscow	Krasnodar
19:00 MSK (UTC+3)	Vilhena (yellow card) 52'; Sabua 59'; Martynovich (yellow card) 63' (yellow-red card) 90+'; Smolnikov (yellow card) 74'	Report	Ponce 13'; Moses 33'; Dzhikiya (yellow card) 48'; Maslov (yellow card) 64'; Larsson 82'; Umyarov (yellow card) 83'	Stadium: Krasnodar Stadium; Attendance: 10,554; Referee: Vladislav Bezborodov

31 October 2020 14	Akhmat Grozny	2–0	Krasnodar	Grozny
16:30 MSK (UTC+3)	Ismael (yellow card) 45' (goal) 82'; Ángel 67'; Nižić (yellow card) 88'	Report	Ramírez (yellow card) 37'; Litvinov (yellow card) 52'; Kaio (yellow card) 54'; Gazinsky (yellow card) 73'; Kambolov (yellow card) 90+'	Stadium: Akhmat-Arena; Attendance: 5,751; Referee: Evgeny Kukulyak

8 November 2020 14	Zenit St.Petersburg	3–1	Krasnodar	Saint Petersburg
19:00 MSK (UTC+3)	Wendel (yellow card) 13'; Dzyuba (penalty missed) 45' 79'; Kuzyayev 65' (yellow card) 88'; Sutormin 90+'	Report	Berg 17' (pen.) (yellow card) 30'; Kaio (yellow card) 84'	Stadium: Krestovsky Stadium; Attendance: 24,068; Referee: Vladimir Moskalyov

21 November 2020 15	Krasnodar	1–0	Tambov	Krasnodar
14:00 MSK (UTC+3)	Cabella 17'; Sorokin (yellow card) 32' (yellow-red card) 60'; Ionov (yellow card) 33'; Martynovich (yellow card) 52'; Kambolov (yellow card) 70'; Ramírez (yellow card) 90+'	Report	Kapliyenko (yellow card) 35'; Haroyan (yellow card) 49' (yellow-red card) 64'; Kostyukov (yellow card) 56'; Rybin (yellow card) 71'; Gritsayenko (yellow card) 79'	Stadium: Krasnodar Stadium; Attendance: 9,287; Referee: Sergey Lapochkin

28 November 2020 16	Khimki	1–0	Krasnodar	Khimki
16:30 MSK (UTC+3)	Konaté (yellow card) 32' (goal) 67'; Dyadyun (yellow card) 59'; Mirzov (yellow card) 90+'	Report	Kaio (yellow card) 22'; Ari (yellow card) 90'; Gazinsky (yellow card) 90+'	Stadium: Arena Khimki; Referee: Sergey Ivanov

5 December 2020 17	Krasnodar	5–0	Rotor Volgograd	Krasnodar
19:00 MSK (UTC+3)	Ari 14', 41'; Vilhena (yellow card) 16'; Kambolov (yellow card) 27'; Suleymanov 43'; Chernikov (yellow card) 60'; Claesson 85', 90+'	Report	Ponce (red card) 16'; Kvirkvelia (yellow card) 41'; Aleynik (yellow card) 45+'	Stadium: Krasnodar Stadium; Attendance: 7,780; Referee: Aleksei Matyunin

13 December 2020 18	Krasnodar	5–0	Lokomotiv Moscow	Krasnodar
16:30 MSK (UTC+3)	Claesson 5' (yellow card) 59'; Cabella 11'; Sorokin (yellow card) 52'; Berg 75', 84'; Suleymanov 80'; Olsson (yellow card) 90+1'	Report	Rajković (yellow card) 38'; An.Miranchuk (penalty missed) 44'; Rybus (yellow card) 70'; Ćorluka (yellow card) 78'	Stadium: Krasnodar Stadium; Attendance: 9,033; Referee: Vladimir Moskalyov

17 December 2020 19	Krasnodar	1–0	Ufa	Krasnodar
18:00 MSK (UTC+3)	Berg 22'; Gazinsky (yellow card) 51'	Report	Krotov (yellow card) 4'; Mrzljak (yellow card) 48'; Alikin (yellow card) 53'; Belenov (yellow card) 82'	Stadium: Krasnodar Stadium; Attendance: 10,554; Referee: Kirill Levnikov

28 February 2021 20	Krasnodar	2–2	Ural Yekaterinburg	Krasnodar
19:00 MSK (UTC+3)	Suleymanov 12'; Smolnikov (yellow card) 26' (yellow-red card) 35'; Cabella 85'	Report	Jovičić (yellow card) 4'; Rykov (yellow card) 48'; Augustyniak 52', 59'	Stadium: Krasnodar Stadium; Attendance: 7,034; Referee: Sergei Karasev

7 March 2021 21	Spartak Moscow	6–1	Krasnodar	Moscow
19:00 MSK (UTC+3)	Sobolev 1', 61'; Promes 8'; Larsson 63', 83'; Gigot (yellow card) 67'; Ponce 75'; Umyarov (yellow card) 88'	Report	Gazinsky 56'; Sorokin (yellow card) 87'	Stadium: Otkritie Arena; Attendance: 10,261; Referee: Vitali Meshkov

14 March 2021 22	Tambov	0–4	Krasnodar	Saransk
16:30 MSK (UTC+3)	Karapuzov (yellow card) 32'; Shakhov (yellow card) 90'	Report	Cabella (yellow card) 26' (goal) 27'; Gazinsky 68'; Olsson 75'; Markov (yellow card) 86'; Ionov 88' (pen.)	Stadium: Mordovia Arena; Referee: Pavel Shadykhanov

18 March 2021 23	Krasnodar	2–3	Dynamo Moscow	Krasnodar
19:00 MSK (UTC+3)	Kaio (yellow card) 8' (yellow-red card) 18'; Vilhena 11'; Claesson (yellow card) 33'; Gazinsky 51'; Sorokin (yellow card) 75'; Wanderson (yellow card) 90+'	Report	Grulyov (yellow card) 12'; Varela (yellow card) 27'; Fomin (yellow card) 51' (goal) 58'; Tyukavin 66', 81'	Stadium: Krasnodar Stadium; Attendance: 10,554; Referee: Vasily Kazartsev

3 April 2021 24	Krasnodar	0–5	Akhmat Grozny	Krasnodar
16:30 MSK (UTC+3)	Claesson (yellow card) 35'; Sorokin (yellow card) 81'; Ari (yellow card) 83'; Suleymanov (yellow card) 90+'	Report	Kharin 5'; Semyonov 49'; Berisha 51', 68'; Shvets (yellow card) 82'; Ionov 90+' (o.g.)	Stadium: Krasnodar Stadium; Attendance: 10,554; Referee: Kirill Levnikov

11 April 2021 25	Arsenal Tula	1–0	Krasnodar	Tula
14:00 MSK (UTC+3)	Belyayev (yellow card) 58'; Čaušić 62'	Report	Berg (yellow card) 8'; Cabella (yellow card) 53'; Vilhena (yellow card) 66'; Wanderson (yellow card) 73'	Stadium: Arsenal Stadium; Attendance: 8,974; Referee: Ivan Sidenkov

17 April 2021 26	Krasnodar	2–2	Zenit St.Petersburg	Krasnodar
19:00 MSK (UTC+3)	Ionov 7', 61'; Olsson (yellow card) 54'; Chernov (yellow card) 71'; Claesson (yellow card) 89'	Report	Chistyakov (yellow card) 44'; Azmoun 75' (yellow card) 90+'; Mostovoy 86'	Stadium: Krasnodar Stadium; Attendance: 17,590; Referee: Sergey Ivanov

25 April 2021 27	Rubin Kazan	0–1	Krasnodar	Kazan
19:00 MSK (UTC+3)	Uremović (yellow card) 52'	Report	Smolnikov (yellow card) 6'; Ionov 17'; Gazinsky (yellow card) 29'	Stadium: Ak Bars Arena; Attendance: 9,108; Referee: Vasily Kazartsev

1 May 2021 28	Krasnodar	1–3	Sochi	Krasnodar
19:00 MSK (UTC+3)	Stotsky (yellow card) 5' (goal) 59'; Cabella (yellow card) 49' (yellow-red card) 79'	Report	Noboa 5' (pen.), 90+'; Prutsev (yellow card) 14'; Terekhov (yellow card) 61'; Yusupov (yellow card) 80'; A.Zabolotny 86'	Stadium: Krasnodar Stadium; Attendance: 17,590; Referee: Ivan Sidenkov

8 May 2021 29	CSKA Moscow	3–1	Krasnodar	Moscow
19:00 MSK (UTC+3)	Ejuke 32'; Diveyev (yellow card) 50'; Chalov 56'; Fernandes 69'	Report	Claesson 26' (yellow card) 58'; Gazinsky (yellow card) 42'; Kaio (yellow card) 75'; Vilhena (yellow card) 77'	Stadium: VEB Arena; Attendance: 10,704; Referee: Vitali Meshkov

16 May 2021 30	Rostov	1–3	Krasnodar	Rostov-on-Don
14:00 MSK (UTC+3)	Folmer (yellow card) 5'; Hashimoto (yellow card) 35'; Gazinsky 49' (o.g.)	Report	Chernov (yellow card) 13'; Olsson 45+'; Wanderson 59'; Kaio 90+'	Stadium: Rostov Arena; Attendance: 25,123; Referee: Aleksei Matyunin

=== Russian Cup ===
21 February 2021 Round of 16	Krasnodar	1–2	Sochi	Krasnodar
17:00 MSK (UTC+3)	Ionov (yellow card) 15'; Gazinsky (yellow card) 43'; Olsson (yellow card) 54'; Berg (yellow card) 54'; Vilhena 81'	Report	Terekhov (yellow card) 44'; Zabolotny 52'; Joãozinho 67'	Stadium: Krasnodar Stadium; Attendance: 7,896; Referee: Evgeny Kukulyak

=== UEFA Champions League ===
==== Play-off round ====
22 September 2020 Play-off round, first leg	Krasnodar (Russia)	2–1	(Greece) PAOK	Krasnodar, Russia
22:00 MSK (UTC+3)	Pantaleão (yellow card) 6'; Claesson 39' (pen.), (yellow card) 55'; Cabella 70'; Berg (yellow card) 88'; Olsson (yellow card) 90+1'	Report	Schwab (yellow card) 8'; Pelkas 32'; Crespo (yellow card) 76'; Ingason (yellow card) 90+1'	Stadium: Krasnodar Stadium; Attendance: 0 Referee: Clément Turpin (France)

30 September 2020 Play-off round, second leg	PAOK (Greece)	1–2 (2–4 agg.)	(Russia) Krasnodar	Thessaloniki, Greece
22:00 MSK (UTC+3)	Ingason (yellow card) 24'; Pelkas (yellow card) 37'; El Kaddouri 77', (yellow card) 90+1'	Report	Vilhena (yellow card) 33'; Pantaleão (yellow card) 35'; Michailidis 73' (o.g.); Cabella 78'	Stadium: Toumba Stadium; Attendance: 0 Referee: Daniele Orsato (Italy)

==== Group stage ====
Pos	Team	Pld	W	D	L	GF	GA	GD	Pts	Qualification
1	(England) Chelsea	6	4	2	0	14	2	+12	14	Advance to knockout phase
2	(Spain) Sevilla	6	4	1	1	9	8	+1	13	Advance to knockout phase
3	(Russia) Krasnodar	6	1	2	3	6	11	−5	5	Transfer to Europa League
4	(France) Rennes	6	0	1	5	3	11	−8	1	

Source: UEFA
Rules for classification: Group stage tiebreakers

20 October 2020 1	Rennes (France)	1–1	(Russia) Krasnodar	Rennes, France
22:00 MSK (UTC+3)	Traoré (yellow card) 44'; Guirassy 56' (pen.); Camavinga (yellow card) 63'; Tait (yellow card) 88'	Report	Olsson (yellow card) 15'; Ramírez 59' (yellow card) 90+2'	Stadium: Roazhon Park; Attendance: 4,973; Referee: Anastasios Sidiropoulos (Greece)

28 October 2020 2	Krasnodar (Russia)	0–4	(England) Chelsea	Krasnodar, Russia
20:55 MSK (UTC+3)	Olsson (yellow card) 22'; Martynovich (yellow card) 76'	Report	Hudson-Odoi 37'; Werner 76' (pen.); Ziyech 80'; Pulisic 90'	Stadium: Krasnodar Stadium; Attendance: 10,544; Referee: Ali Palabıyık (Turkey)

4 November 2020 3	Sevilla (Spain)	3–2	(Russia) Krasnodar	Seville, Spain
23:00 MSK (UTC+3)	Koundé (yellow card) 16'; Rakitić 42'; Navas (red card) 45+5'; Óscar (yellow card) 50'; En-Nesyri 69', 72'	Report	Suleymanov 17'; Berg 21' (pen.) (yellow card) 90'; Spertsyan (yellow card) 51'; Kaio (yellow card) 59'	Stadium: Ramón Sánchez Pizjuán; Attendance: 0 Referee: Felix Brych (Germany)
Note: Match played behind closed doors due to the COVID-19 pandemic in Spain.

24 November 2020 4	Krasnodar (Russia)	1–2	(Spain) Sevilla	Krasnodar, Russia
20:55 MSK (UTC+3)	Suleymanov (yellow card) 19'; Wanderson 56'	Report	Rakitić 4'; Jordán (yellow card) 58'; Munir 90+5'	Stadium: Krasnodar Stadium; Attendance: 0 Referee: Marco Guida (Italy)

2 December 2020 5	Krasnodar (Russia)	1–0	(France) Rennes	Krasnodar, Russia
20:55 MSK (UTC+3)	Ramírez (yellow card) 23'; Wanderson (yellow card) 28'; Berg 71'	Report	Nzonzi (yellow card) 22'; Léa Siliki (yellow card) 54'	Stadium: Krasnodar Stadium; Attendance: 8,747; Referee: Willie Collum (Scotland)

8 December 2020 6	Chelsea (England)	1–1	(Russia) Krasnodar	London, England
23:00 MSK (UTC+3)	Jorginho 28' (pen.); Azpilicueta (yellow card) 82'	Report	Cabella 24'	Stadium: Stamford Bridge; Attendance: 2,000; Referee: Pavel Královec (Czech Republic)

=== UEFA Europa League ===
==== Knockout phase ====
18 February 2021 Round of 32 1st Leg	Krasnodar (Russia)	2–3	(Croatia) Dinamo Zagreb	Krasnodar, Russia
20:55 MSK (UTC+3)	Berg 28'; Claesson 69'	Report	Petković 15', 54'; Atiemwen 75'; Franjić (yellow card) 90'	Stadium: Krasnodar Stadium; Attendance: 9,897; Referee: Bartosz Frankowski (Poland)

25 February 2021 Round of 32 2nd Leg	Dinamo Zagreb (Croatia)	1–0 (4–2 agg.)	(Russia) Krasnodar	Zagreb, Croatia
23:00 MSK (UTC+3)	Oršić 31'; Majer (yellow card) 60'	Report	Vilhena (yellow card) 42'	Stadium: Stadion Maksimir; Attendance: 0 Referee: Halil Umut Meler (Turkey)
Note: Match played behind closed doors due to the COVID-19 pandemic in Croatia.

== Squad statistics ==
As of match played 16 May 2021

=== Appearances and goals ===
No.	Pos	Nat	Player	Total		Premier League		Russian Cup		Champions League		Europa League	
No.	Pos	Nat	Player	Apps	Goals	Apps	Goals	Apps	Goals	Apps	Goals	Apps	Goals
1	GK	(Russia) RUS	Yevgeni Gorodov	8	0	4	0	1	0	2	0	1	0
2	DF	(Russia) RUS	Yegor Sorokin	20	0	13+2	0	1	0	2+2	0	0	0
3	DF	(Cameroon) CMR	Ambroise Oyongo	1	0	0+1	0	0	0	0	0	0	0
4	DF	(Belarus) BLR	Alyaksandr Martynovich	33	0	23+1	0	1	0	6	0	2	0
6	DF	(Ecuador) ECU	Cristian Ramírez	24	1	12+4	0	0	0	8	1	0	0
7	MF	(France) FRA	Rémy Cabella	32	11	19+5	8	0+1	0	5	3	2	0
8	MF	(Russia) RUS	Yury Gazinsky	35	3	25+1	3	1	0	5+1	0	1+1	0
9	FW	(Russia) RUS	Ari	13	2	3+6	2	0+1	0	0+2	0	0+1	0
10	MF	(Brazil) BRA	Wanderson	29	3	16+5	2	1	0	3+2	1	1+1	0
11	MF	(Russia) RUS	Aleksei Ionov	22	4	16+3	4	1	0	0	0	1+1	0
12	GK	(Russia) RUS	Yegor Baburin	2	0	2	0	0	0	0	0	0	0
14	MF	(Sweden) SWE	Kristoffer Olsson	35	3	18+8	3	1	0	6	0	1+1	0
15	MF	(Russia) RUS	Aleks Matsukatov	6	0	0+6	0	0	0	0	0	0	0
16	MF	(Sweden) SWE	Viktor Claesson	33	8	20+4	6	1	0	5+1	1	2	1
18	DF	(Russia) RUS	Yevgeni Chernov	26	0	14+4	0	1	0	3+2	0	2	0
20	FW	(Russia) RUS	Yevgeni Markov	8	0	2+5	0	0	0	0+1	0	0	0
28	DF	(Russia) RUS	Igor Smolnikov	32	0	17+6	0	1	0	5+1	0	2	0
31	MF	(Brazil) BRA	Kaio	34	1	22+2	1	0	0	8	0	2	0
33	FW	(Sweden) SWE	Marcus Berg	31	12	19+2	9	1	0	8	2	1	1
39	GK	(Russia) RUS	Matvei Safonov	27	0	21	0	0	0	6	0	0	0
47	MF	(Russia) RUS	Daniil Utkin	26	1	9+11	1	0	0	4+2	0	0	0
52	MF	(Netherlands) NED	Tonny Vilhena	34	3	17+7	2	0+1	1	6+1	0	2	0
53	MF	(Russia) RUS	Aleksandr Chernikov	1	0	0+1	0	0	0	0	0	0	0
58	GK	(Russia) RUS	Stanislav Agkatsev	3	0	2	0	0	0	0	0	1	0
67	FW	(Russia) RUS	Maksim Kutovoy	7	0	1+6	0	0	0	0	0	0	0
74	MF	(Armenia) ARM	Eduard Spertsyan	7	0	2+3	0	0	0	0+2	0	0	0
77	MF	(Russia) RUS	Ruslan Kambolov	14	0	1+9	0	0+1	0	0+3	0	0	0
81	FW	(Russia) RUS	Leon Sabua	4	1	0+2	1	0	0	1+1	0	0	0
84	DF	(Russia) RUS	Vyacheslav Litvinov	2	0	1+1	0	0	0	0	0	0	0
89	MF	(Russia) RUS	Dmitry Stotsky	6	1	3+3	1	0	0	0	0	0	0
93	FW	(Russia) RUS	Magomed-Shapi Suleymanov	38	5	8+19	4	0+1	0	2+6	1	1+1	0
98	DF	(Russia) RUS	Sergei Petrov	13	2	9+1	2	0	0	3	0	0	0
Players away from the club on loan:
Players who left Krasnodar during the season:

=== Goal scorers ===
Place	Position	Nation	Number	Name	Premier League	Russian Cup	Champions League	Europa League	Total
1	FW	(Sweden)	33	Marcus Berg	9	0	2	1	12
2	MF	(France)	7	Rémy Cabella	8	0	3	0	11
3	MF	(Sweden)	16	Viktor Claesson	6	0	1	1	8
4	FW	(Russia)	93	Magomed-Shapi Suleymanov	4	0	1	0	5
5	MF	(Russia)	11	Aleksei Ionov	4	0	0	0	4
6	MF	(Russia)	8	Yury Gazinsky	3	0	0	0	3
6	MF	(Sweden)	14	Kristoffer Olsson	3	0	0	0	3
6	MF	(Netherlands)	52	Tonny Vilhena	2	1	0	0	3
6	MF	(Brazil)	10	Wanderson	2	0	1	0	3
10	DF	(Russia)	98	Sergei Petrov	2	0	0	0	2
10	FW	(Russia)	9	Ari	2	0	0	0	2
12	MF	(Russia)	47	Daniil Utkin	1	0	0	0	1
12	FW	(Russia)	81	Leon Sabua	1	0	0	0	1
12	MF	(Russia)	89	Dmitry Stotsky	1	0	0	0	1
12	MF	(Brazil)	31	Kaio	1	0	0	0	1
12	DF	(Ecuador)	6	Cristian Ramírez	0	0	1	0	1
12				Own goal	0	0	1	0	1
				Awarded Goals	3	0	0	0	3
				TOTALS	52	1	10	2	65

=== Clean sheets ===
Place	Position	Nation	Number	Name	Premier League	Russian Cup	Champions League	Europa League	Total
1	GK	(Russia)	39	Matvei Safonov	4	0	1	0	5
2	GK	(Russia)	1	Yevgeni Gorodov	3	0	0	0	3
3	GK	(Russia)	12	Yegor Baburin	1	0	0	0	1
				TOTALS	8	0	1	0	9

=== Disciplinary record ===
Number	Nation	Position	Name	Premier League		Russian Cup		Champions League		Europa League		Total	
Number	Nation	Position	Name	Booked	Sent off (straight red)	Booked	Sent off (straight red)	Booked	Sent off (straight red)	Booked	Sent off (straight red)	Booked	Sent off (straight red)
2	(Russia)	DF	Yegor Sorokin	6	1	0	0	0	0	0	0	6	1
4	(Belarus)	DF	Alyaksandr Martynovich	4	1	0	0	1	0	0	0	5	1
6	(Ecuador)	DF	Cristian Ramírez	4	0	0	0	2	0	0	0	6	0
7	(France)	MF	Rémy Cabella	4	1	0	0	0	0	0	0	4	1
8	(Russia)	MF	Yury Gazinsky	7	0	1	0	0	0	0	0	8	0
9	(Russia)	FW	Ari	2	0	0	0	0	0	0	0	2	0
10	(Brazil)	MF	Wanderson	2	0	0	0	1	0	0	0	3	0
11	(Russia)	MF	Aleksei Ionov	1	0	1	0	0	0	0	0	2	0
14	(Sweden)	MF	Kristoffer Olsson	6	0	1	0	3	0	0	0	10	0
16	(Sweden)	MF	Viktor Claesson	6	0	0	0	1	0	0	0	7	0
18	(Russia)	DF	Yevgeni Chernov	2	0	0	0	0	0	0	0	2	0
20	(Russia)	FW	Yevgeni Markov	1	0	0	0	0	0	0	0	1	0
28	(Russia)	DF	Igor Smolnikov	7	1	0	0	0	0	0	0	7	1
31	(Brazil)	MF	Kaio	10	2	0	0	3	0	0	0	13	2
33	(Sweden)	FW	Marcus Berg	4	0	1	0	2	0	0	0	7	0
47	(Russia)	MF	Daniil Utkin	2	0	0	0	0	0	0	0	2	0
52	(Netherlands)	MF	Tonny Vilhena	4	0	0	0	1	0	1	0	6	0
53	(Russia)	MF	Aleksandr Chernikov	1	0	0	0	0	0	0	0	1	0
74	(Armenia)	MF	Eduard Spertsyan	0	0	0	0	1	0	0	0	1	0
77	(Russia)	MF	Ruslan Kambolov	3	0	0	0	0	0	0	0	3	0
84	(Russia)	DF	Vyacheslav Litvinov	1	0	0	0	0	0	0	0	1	0
89	(Russia)	MF	Dmitry Stotsky	1	0	0	0	0	0	0	0	1	0
93	(Russia)	FW	Magomed-Shapi Suleymanov	1	0	0	0	1	0	0	0	2	0
98	(Russia)	DF	Sergei Petrov	4	0	0	0	0	0	0	0	4	0
Players away on loan:
Players who left Krasnodar during the season:
			TOTALS	83	6	4	0	16	0	1	0	104	6
