= Igoshin =

Igoshin (masculine, Russian: Игошин) or Igoshina (feminine, Russian: Игошина) is a Russian surname. Notable people with the surname include:

- Igor Igoshin (born 1970), Russian politician
- Konstantīns Igošins (born 1971), Latvian soccer player
- Maksim Igoshin (born 1978), Russian soccer manager and former player
- Valentina Igoshina (born 1978), Russian pianist
