= 2012–13 FC Zenit Saint Petersburg season =

Football team season

Zenit St. Petersburg
2012–13 season
- Chairman: Aleksandr Dyukov
- Manager: Luciano Spalletti
- Stadium: Petrovsky Stadium
- Russian Premier League: 2nd
- Russian Cup: Semi-finals vs Anzhi Makhachkala
- Russian Super Cup: Runners-up
- Champions League: Group stage
- Europa League: Round of 16 vs Basel
- Top goalscorer: League: Aleksandr Kerzhakov (10 goals); All: Hulk; Aleksandr Kerzhakov (11 each)
- Highest home attendance: 21,703 vs Milan; 3 October 2012
- Lowest home attendance: 0 vs CSKA Moscow; 26 November 2012 & Anzhi Makhachkala; 10 December 2012
- Average home league attendance: 15,919
| Home colours | Away colours |

The 2012–13 Zenit season was the 17th successive season that the club will play in the Russian Premier League, the highest tier of association football in Russia.

== Squad ==
As of 2 February 2013. According to RFPL and FC Zenit

Note: Flags indicate national team as defined under FIFA eligibility rules; some limited exceptions apply. Players may hold more than one non-FIFA nationality.

| No. | Pos. | Nation | Player |
|---|---|---|---|
| 2 | DF | RUS | Aleksandr Anyukov |
| 3 | DF | POR | Bruno Alves |
| 4 | DF | ITA | Domenico Criscito |
| 6 | DF | BEL | Nicolas Lombaerts |
| 9 | FW | RUS | Aleksandr Bukharov |
| 10 | MF | POR | Danny |
| 11 | FW | RUS | Aleksandr Kerzhakov |
| 13 | DF | POR | Luís Neto |
| 14 | DF | SVK | Tomáš Hubočan |
| 15 | MF | RUS | Roman Shirokov (captain) |
| 16 | GK | RUS | Vyacheslav Malafeev (vice-captain) |
| 18 | MF | RUS | Konstantin Zyryanov (vice-captain) |

| No. | Pos. | Nation | Player |
|---|---|---|---|
| 20 | MF | RUS | Viktor Fayzulin |
| 21 | DF | SRB | Milan Rodić |
| 24 | DF | SRB | Aleksandar Luković |
| 25 | MF | RUS | Sergei Semak |
| 27 | MF | RUS | Igor Denisov |
| 28 | MF | BEL | Axel Witsel |
| 29 | FW | BRA | Hulk |
| 30 | GK | BLR | Yuri Zhevnov |
| 34 | MF | RUS | Vladimir Bystrov |
| 50 | DF | RUS | Igor Cheminava |
| 71 | GK | RUS | Yegor Baburin |
| 77 | FW | MNE | Luka Đorđević |

== Transfers ==
=== Summer ===
In: Note: Flags indicate national team as defined under FIFA eligibility rules; some limited exceptions apply. Players may hold more than one non-FIFA nationality.

| No. | Pos. | Nation | Player |
|---|---|---|---|
| 28 | DF | DEN | Michael Lumb (end of loan to (Germany) Freiburg, not later than June 2012) |
| 28 | MF | BEL | Axel Witsel (from (Portugal) Benfica) |
| 29 | FW | BRA | Hulk (from (Portugal) Porto) |
| 50 | DF | RUS | Igor Cheminava (end of loan to (Russia) Sibir Novosibirsk) |
| 55 | DF | RUS | Renat Yanbayev (on loan from (Russia) Lokomotiv Moscow) |
| 77 | FW | MNE | Luka Đorđević (end of loan to (Montenegro) Mogren) |

Out: Note: Flags indicate national team as defined under FIFA eligibility rules; some limited exceptions apply. Players may hold more than one non-FIFA nationality.

| No. | Pos. | Nation | Player |
|---|---|---|---|
| 17 | MF | ITA | Alessandro Rosina (to (Italy) Siena) |
| 23 | MF | HUN | Szabolcs Huszti (to (Germany) Hannover 96) |
| 28 | DF | DEN | Michael Lumb (to (Germany) VfL Bochum September 2012) |
| 29 | FW | RUS | Andrei Arshavin (end of loan from (England) Arsenal) |
| 72 | MF | RUS | Ayzer Abbasov (to (Russia) Krylia Sovetov Samara) |
| 82 | GK | RUS | Daniil Sizko (to (Russia) Rus Saint Petersburg) |
| — | FW | RUS | Stanislav Matyash (to (Russia) Amkar Perm, previously on loan to (Russia) Volgar Astrakhan) |
| — | FW | USA | Eugene Starikov (on loan to (Russia) Rostov) |

=== Winter ===
In: Note: Flags indicate national team as defined under FIFA eligibility rules; some limited exceptions apply. Players may hold more than one non-FIFA nationality.

| No. | Pos. | Nation | Player |
|---|---|---|---|
| 13 | DF | POR | Luís Neto (from (Italy) Siena) |
| 21 | DF | SRB | Milan Rodić (from (Serbia) OFK Beograd) |

Out: Note: Flags indicate national team as defined under FIFA eligibility rules; some limited exceptions apply. Players may hold more than one non-FIFA nationality.

| No. | Pos. | Nation | Player |
|---|---|---|---|
| 55 | DF | RUS | Renat Yanbayev (loan return to (Russia) Lokomotiv Moscow) |
| 99 | FW | RUS | Maksim Kanunnikov (to (Russia) Amkar Perm) |
| — | GK | RUS | Dmitri Borodin (end of career) |
| — | FW | SRB | Danko Lazović (on loan to (Russia) Rostov) |

== Friendlies ==
| 16 January 2013 | Zenit St. Petersburg (Russia) | 4 – 1 | (Saudi Arabia) Al-Hilal | Abu Dhabi, United Arab Emirates |
| 17:00 MSK (UTC+4) | Bukharov 26'; Hulk 37' (pen.); Alves 58'; Đorđević 62' | Summary | Al Abdullah S 31' | Stadium: Sheikh Zayed Stadium |

| 19 January 2013 | Zenit St. Petersburg (Russia) | 0 – 1 | (Egypt) Zamalek | Abu Dhabi, United Arab Emirates |
| 20:00 MSK (UTC+4) | | [ Summary] | Samir | Stadium: Sheikh Zayed Stadium |

| 22 January 2013 Super Cup of Champions | Zenit St. Petersburg (Russia) | 1 – 3 | (Ukraine) Shakhtar Donetsk | Abu Dhabi, United Arab Emirates |
| 17:00 MSK (UTC+4) | Zyryanov 35' | Stats; Live Text; Report | Mkhitaryan 21', 39'; Eduardo 79' | Stadium: Al-Wasl Stadium; Attendance: 300 or 1,500; Referee: Bader Abdullah (UAE) |

| 29 January 2013 | Zenit St. Petersburg (Russia) | 1 – 0 | (Croatia) RNK Split | Turkey |
| 19:00 MSK (UTC+4) | Fayzulin (2nd Half) | [ Summary] |

| 31 January 2013 | Zenit St. Petersburg (Russia) | 1 – 0 | (Poland) Górnik Zabrze | Turkey |
| 13:00 MSK (UTC+4) | Bystrov (2nd Half) | [ Summary] |

== Competitions ==
=== Russian Super Cup ===
| 14 July 2012 | Zenit St. Petersburg | 0–2 | Rubin Kazan | Samara |
| 16:00 MSK (UTC+4) | | Report | Bocchetti 28'; Dyadyun 38' | Stadium: Metallurg; Attendance: 16,284; Referee: Sergei Karasyov (Moscow) |

| Zenit | Rubin |

| GK | 16 | (Russia) Vyacheslav Malafeev (c) |
| DF | 3 | (Portugal) Bruno Alves | (substituted off) 65' |
| DF | 4 | (Italy) Domenico Criscito | (yellow card) 68' |
| DF | 6 | (Belgium) Nicolas Lombaerts |
| DF | 14 | (Slovakia) Tomáš Hubočan |
| MF | 15 | (Russia) Roman Shirokov |
| MF | 20 | (Russia) Viktor Fayzulin |
| MF | 25 | (Russia) Sergei Semak | (substituted off) 46' |
| MF | 27 | (Russia) Igor Denisov | (yellow card) 31' |
| MF | 34 | (Russia) Vladimir Bystrov | (yellow card) 62' | (substituted off) 71' |
| FW | 11 | (Russia) Aleksandr Kerzhakov |
Substitutes:
| GK | 30 | (Belarus) Yuri Zhevnov |
| DF | 24 | (Serbia) Aleksandar Luković | (substituted on) 65' |
| DF | 58 | (Russia) Ilya Zuyev |
| MF | 18 | (Russia) Konstantin Zyryanov | (substituted on) 71' |
| MF | 94 | (Russia) Aleksei Yevseyev |
| FW | 9 | (Russia) Aleksandr Bukharov | (substituted on) 46' |
| FW | 99 | (Russia) Maksim Kanunnikov |
Manager:
(Italy) Luciano Spalletti Assistant referees: Vitali Drozdov (Moscow); Oleg Tselovalnikov (Astrakhan); Fourth official: Maksim Layushkin (Moscow)

| GK | 1 | (Russia) Sergey Ryzhikov |
| DF | 2 | (Russia) Oleg Kuzmin |
| DF | 3 | (Argentina) Cristian Ansaldi | (yellow card) 40' |
| DF | 4 | (Spain) César Navas |
| DF | 27 | (Italy) Salvatore Bocchetti | (yellow card) 75' |
| DF | 76 | (Russia) Roman Sharonov (c) |
| MF | 8 | (Russia) Aleksandr Ryazantsev |
| MF | 23 | (Finland) Roman Eremenko |
| MF | 61 | (Turkey) Gökdeniz Karadeniz | (substituted off) 78' |
| FW | 5 | (Nigeria) Obafemi Martins | (yellow card) 34' | (substituted off) 64' |
| FW | 22 | (Russia) Vladimir Dyadyun | (substituted off) 74' |
Substitutes:
| GK | 24 | (Lithuania) Giedrius Arlauskis |
| DF | 19 | (Russia) Vitali Kaleshin | (substituted on) 74' |
| DF | 25 | (Spain) Iván Marcano | (substituted on) 78' |
| MF | 10 | (Russia) Alan Kasaev |
| MF | 16 | (Moldova) Mikhail Platica |
| MF | 20 | (Finland) Alexei Eremenko |
| FW | 18 | (Paraguay) Nelson Haedo Valdez | (substituted on) 64' |
Manager:
(Russia) Kurban Berdyev

=== Russian Premier League ===
==== Matches ====
| 22 July 2012 1 | Zenit St. Petersburg | 2 – 0 | Amkar Perm | Saint Petersburg |
| 15:00 MSK (UTC+4) | Kerzhakov 37', 62' (pen.) | Summary | | Stadium: Petrovsky Stadium; Attendance: 20,057; Referee: Aleksey Eskov |

| 28 July 2012 2 | Zenit St. Petersburg | 2 – 0 | Dynamo Moscow | Saint Petersburg |
| 14:30 MSK (UTC+4) | Kerzhakov 10'; Criscito 71' | Summary | | Stadium: Petrovsky Stadium; Attendance: 20,068; Referee: Vitali Meshkov |

| 4 August 2012 3 | CSKA Moscow | 1 – 3 | Zenit St. Petersburg | Moscow |
| 13:30 MSK (UTC+4) | Honda 43' | Summary | Semak 10', 32'; Kerzhakov 14' (pen.) | Stadium: Luzhniki Stadium; Attendance: 15,621; Referee: Alexey Nikolaev |

| 11 August 2012 4 | Zenit St. Petersburg | 5 – 0 | Spartak Moscow | Saint Petersburg |
| 14:30 MSK (UTC+4) | Kanunnikov 15'; Bystrov 52'; Shirokov 61', 88'; Fayzulin 67' | Summary | McGeady (red card) 63' | Stadium: Petrovsky Stadium; Attendance: 21,107; Referee: Mikhail Vilkov |

| 19 August 2012 5 | Anzhi Makhachkala | 1 – 1 | Zenit St. Petersburg | Makhachkala, Dagestan |
| 21:00 MSK (UTC+4) | Shatov 65' | Summary | Zyryanov 20' | Stadium: Dynamo Stadium; Attendance: 15,200; Referee: Vladimir Kazmenko |

| 25 August 2012 6 | Zenit St. Petersburg | 1 – 2 | Rubin Kazan | Saint Petersburg |
| 16:00 MSK (UTC+4) | Fayzulin 25' | Summary | Natcho 52' (pen.); Eremenko 61' | Stadium: Petrovsky Stadium; Attendance: 20,500; Referee: Aleksandr Egorov |

| 31 August 2012 7 | Mordovia Saransk | 0 – 3 | Zenit St. Petersburg | Saransk |
| 19:00 MSK (UTC+4) | | Summary | Zyryanov 25'; Kerzhakov 55', 63' | Stadium: Start Stadium; Attendance: 11,500; Referee: Evgeny Turbin |

| 14 September 2012 8 | Zenit St. Petersburg | 0 – 2 | Terek Grozny | Saint Petersburg |
| 20:00 MSK (UTC+4) | | Summary | Aílton 86'; Lebedenko 90+3' | Stadium: Petrovsky Stadium; Attendance: 20,500; Referee: Eduard Malyi |

| 22 September 2012 9 | Krylia Sovetov | 2 – 2 | Zenit St. Petersburg | Samara, Samara Oblast |
| 18:00 MSK (UTC+4) | Karnilenka 10'; Caballero 26'; Epureanu (yellow card) 45+2' (yellow-red card) 75' | Summary | Hulk 65'; Shirokov 78' | Stadium: Metallurg Stadium; Attendance: 16,570; Referee: Sergey Karasev |

| 29 September 2012 10 | Zenit St. Petersburg | 1 – 1 | Lokomotiv Moscow | Saint Petersburg |
| 14:00 MSK (UTC+4) | Criscito 14'; Anyukov (yellow card) 31' (yellow-red card) 48' | Summary | N'Doye 25'; Shishkin (yellow card) 6' (yellow-red card) 32' | Stadium: Petrovsky Stadium; Attendance: 19,500; Referee: Mikhail Vilkov |

| 7 October 2012 11 | Krasnodar | 0 – 2 | Zenit St. Petersburg | Krasnodar, Krasnodar Krai |
| 20:15 MSK (UTC+4) | | Summary | Zyryanov 69'; Fayzulin 78' | Stadium: Kuban Stadium; Attendance: 15,400; Referee: Timur Arslanbekov |

| 20 October 2012 12 | Zenit St. Petersburg | 1 – 0 | Kuban Krasnodar | Saint Petersburg |
| 16:00 MSK (UTC+4) | Kerzhakov 45+1' (pen.) | Summary | | Stadium: Petrovsky Stadium; Attendance: 20,000; Referee: Sergey Karasev |

| 27 October 2012 13 | Alania Vladikavkaz | 2 – 3 | Zenit St. Petersburg | Vladikavkaz |
| 19:30 MSK (UTC+4) | Khozin 34', 44' | Summary | Bystrov 13'; Kerzhakov 71', 88' | Stadium: Republican Spartak Stadium; Attendance: 12,500; Referee: Sergey Kuznetsov |

| 2 November 2012 14 | Zenit St. Petersburg | 2 – 1 | Rostov | Saint Petersburg |
| 19:00 MSK (UTC+4) | Bystrov 51'; Shirokov 90+3' | Summary | Holenda 79' | Stadium: Petrovsky Stadium; Attendance: 18,600; Referee: Maxim Layushkin |

| 10 November 2012 15 | Volga Nizhny Novgorod | 1 – 2 | Zenit St. Petersburg | Nizhny Novgorod, Nizhny Novgorod Oblast |
| 18:00 MSK (UTC+4) | Maksimov 90' | Summary | Anyukov 32'; Kerzhakov 90+1' | Stadium: Lokomotiv Stadium; Attendance: 10,700; Referee: Vladimir Kazmenko |

| 17 November 2012 16 | Dynamo Moscow | 3 – 0^{1} | Zenit St. Petersburg | Moscow |
| 16:00 MSK (UTC+4) | Granat 27' | Summary | | Stadium: Arena Khimki; Referee: Alexey Nikolaev |

| 26 November 2012 17 | Zenit St. Petersburg | 1 – 1 | CSKA Moscow | Saint Petersburg |
| 20:00 MSK (UTC+4) | Yanbaev 56' | Summary | Elm 85' (pen.) | Stadium: Petrovsky Stadium; Attendance: 0 Referee: Aleksandr Egorov |

| 30 November 2012 18 | Spartak Moscow | 2 – 4 | Zenit St. Petersburg | Moscow |
| 20:30 MSK (UTC+4) | Dzyuba 26'; Pareja (yellow card) 64' (yellow-red card) 69'; Emenike 81'; Insaurralde (red card) 90+3' | Summary | Hulk 21'; Witsel 41', 71'; Shirokov 78' | Stadium: Luzhniki Stadium; Attendance: 13,251; Referee: Sergey Karasev |

| 10 December 2012 19 | Zenit St. Petersburg | 1 – 1 | Anzhi Makhachkala | Saint Petersburg |
| 20:00 MSK (UTC+4) | Zyryanov 66'; Danny (red card) 90+2' | Summary | João Carlos 24' | Stadium: Petrovsky Stadium; Attendance: 0 Referee: Maxim Layushkin |

| 10 March 2013 20 | Rubin Kazan | 1 – 0 | Zenit St. Petersburg | Kazan, Tatarstan |
| 16:00 MSK (UTC+4) | Neto 30' (o.g.) | Summary | | Stadium: Central Stadium; Attendance: 16,500; Referee: Timur Arslanbekov |

| 17 March 2013 21 | Zenit St. Petersburg | 1 – 0 | Mordovia Saransk | Saint Petersburg |
| 20:15 MSK (UTC+4) | Hulk 55' | Summary | Božović (yellow card) 41' (yellow-red card) 62' | Stadium: Petrovsky Stadium; Attendance: 16,876; Referee: Vlafimar Kazmenko |

| 31 March 2013 22 | Terek Grozny | 0 – 3 | Zenit St. Petersburg | Makhachkala, Dagestan |
| 18:00 MSK (UTC+4) | Kudryashov (red card) 45+2' | Summary | Witsel 8'; Alves 58'; Zyryanov 90+2' | Stadium: Dynamo Stadium; Attendance: 24,128; Referee: Sergey Karasev |

| 7 April 2013 23 | Zenit St. Petersburg | 1 – 0 | Krylia Sovetov | Saint Petersburg |
| 14:30 MSK (UTC+4) | Hulk 14' (pen.); Danny (yellow card) 45+1'; Rodić (yellow card) 57'; Witsel (yellow card) 90' | Summary | Angbwa (yellow card) 20'; Vyeramko (yellow card) 38' | Stadium: Petrovsky Stadium; Attendance: 19,741; Referee: Maxim Layushkin |

| 13 April 2013 24 | Lokomotiv Moscow | 0 – 1 | Zenit St. Petersburg | Moscow |
| MSK (UTC+4) | Ďurica (yellow card) 23' | Summary | Fayzulin 16'; Hulk (yellow card) 90+4' | Stadium: Lokomotiv Stadium; Attendance: 17,016; Referee: Aleksey Eskov |

| 21 April 2013 25 | Zenit St. Petersburg | 1 – 0 | Krasnodar | Saint Petersburg |
| 16:00 MSK (UTC+4) | Danny 90+4' | Summary | | Stadium: Petrovsky Stadium; Attendance: 18,877; Referee: Sergei Ivanov |

| 28 April 2013 26 | Kuban Krasnodar | 2 – 2 | Zenit St. Petersburg | Krasnodar, Krasnodar Krai |
| 16:00 MSK (UTC+4) | Niculae 24'; Popov 30' | Summary | Zyryanov 6'; Danny 66' | Stadium: Kuban Stadium; Attendance: 30,359; Referee: Aleksandr Egorov |

| 4 May 2013 27 | Zenit St. Petersburg | 4 – 0 | Alania Vladikavkaz | Saint Petersburg |
| 20:15 MSK (UTC+4) | Hulk 36' (pen.) 64', 72'; Bukharov 88' | Summary | Vranješ (yellow card) 9' (red card) 14' | Stadium: Petrovsky Stadium; Attendance: 19,307; Referee: Mikhail Vilkov |

| 12 May 2013 28 | Rostov | 1 – 1 | Zenit St. Petersburg | Rostov-on-Don, Rostov Oblast |
| 18:30 MSK (UTC+4) | Dyakov 80' (pen.); Kalachev (yellow card) 90' (yellow-red card) 90+5' | Summary | Witsel 6' | Stadium: Olimp – 2 Attendance: 15,000; Referee: Aleksey Eskov |

| 19 May 2013 29 | Zenit St. Petersburg | 3 – 1 | Volga Nizhny Novgorod | Saint Petersburg |
| 18:30 MSK (UTC+4) | Neto 34'; Fayzulin 20'; Shirokov 90+1'; Shirokov (red card) 90+2' | Summary | Shulenin 17'; Karyaka (yellow card) 10' (yellow-red card) 76' | Stadium: Petrovsky Stadium; Attendance: 18,604; Referee: Aleksandr Egorov |

| 26 May 2013 30 | Amkar Perm | 0 – 0 | Zenit St. Petersburg | Perm, Perm Krai |
| 13:30 MSK (UTC+4) | | Summary | | Stadium: Zvezda Stadium; Attendance: 14,150; Referee: Timur Arslanbekov |

Notes

- The Russian Championship match between Dynamo Moscow and Zenit Saint Petersburg was suspended after 35 minutes after a missile was launched from the crowd at Dynamo's goalkeeper Anton Shunin. On 22 November Dynamo were awarded a 3-0 win, whilst Zenit were fined 500,000 rouble (£10,025.69) and forced to play their next two home games behind closed doors.

==== League table ====
| Pos | Team | Pld | W | D | L | GF | GA | GD | Pts | Qualification or relegation |
|---|---|---|---|---|---|---|---|---|---|---|
| 1 | CSKA Moscow (C) | 30 | 20 | 4 | 6 | 49 | 25 | +24 | 64 | Qualification for the Champions League group stage |
| 2 | Zenit St. Petersburg | 30 | 18 | 8 | 4 | 53 | 25 | +28 | 62 | Qualification for the Champions League third qualifying round |
| 3 | Anzhi Makhachkala | 30 | 15 | 8 | 7 | 45 | 34 | +11 | 53 | Qualification for the Europa League group stage |
| 4 | Spartak Moscow | 30 | 15 | 6 | 9 | 51 | 39 | +12 | 51 | Qualification to Europa League play-off round |
| 5 | Kuban Krasnodar | 30 | 14 | 9 | 7 | 48 | 28 | +20 | 51 | Qualification for the Europa League third qualifying round |

Source: Russian Premier League
Rules for classification: 1) points; 2) number of wins; 3) head-to-head points; 4) number of head-to-head wins; 5) head-to-head goal difference; 6) number of head-to-head goals scored; 7) number of head-to-head away goals scored; 8) goal difference; 9) number of goals scored; 10) number of away goals scored; 11) position in the 2011–12 season (only used until all the regularly scheduled games have been played); 11) extra play-off game or tournament between the teams in question.
(C) Champions

=== Russian Cup ===
| 25 September 2012 Round of 32 | Baltika Kaliningrad | 1–2 | Zenit St. Petersburg | Kaliningrad |
| 20:00 MSK (UTC+4) | Plopa 74' | Summary | Hulk 13'; Alves 71' | Stadium: Baltika Stadium; Attendance: 14,500; Referee: Sergei Ivanov |

| 30 October 2012 Round of 16 | Mordovia Saransk | 0–2 | Zenit St. Petersburg | Saransk |
| 17:00 MSK (UTC+4) | | Summary | Semak 66'; Criscito 90+1' | Stadium: Start Stadium; Attendance: 4,500; Referee: Aleksey Eskov |

| 17 April 2013 Quarter-finals | Zenit St. Petersburg | 0–0 (4–3 p) | Kuban Krasnodar | Saint Petersburg |
| 19:30 MSK (UTC+4) | | Summary | | Stadium: Petrovsky Stadium; Attendance: 19,000; Referee: Vladimir Kazmenko |
| | Penalties |
| | Kerzhakov (penalty scored); Luković (penalty scored); Faizulin (penalty missed); Denisov (penalty missed); Witsel (penalty scored); Semak (penalty scored) | | (penalty scored) Bucur; (penalty scored) Popov; (penalty missed) Kaboré; (penalty missed) Dealbert; (penalty scored) Tsorayev; (penalty missed) Leandro |

| 8 May 2013 Semi-finals | Zenit St. Petersburg | 0–1 | Anzhi Makhachkala | Saint Petersburg |
| 19:30 MSK (UTC+4) | | Summary | Eto'o 61' | Stadium: Petrovsky Stadium; Referee: 19,441 |

=== UEFA Champions League ===
==== Group stage ====
| Pos | Team | Pld | W | D | L | GF | GA | GD | Pts | Qualification | MLG | MIL | ZEN | AND |
|---|---|---|---|---|---|---|---|---|---|---|---|---|---|---|
| 1 | (Spain) Málaga | 6 | 3 | 3 | 0 | 12 | 5 | +7 | 12 | Advance to knockout phase | — | 1–0 | 3–0 | 2–2 |
| 2 | (Italy) Milan | 6 | 2 | 2 | 2 | 7 | 6 | +1 | 8 | Advance to knockout phase | 1–1 | — | 0–1 | 0–0 |
| 3 | (Russia) Zenit Saint Petersburg | 6 | 2 | 1 | 3 | 6 | 9 | −3 | 7 | Transfer to Europa League | 2–2 | 2–3 | — | 1–0 |
| 4 | (Belgium) Anderlecht | 6 | 1 | 2 | 3 | 4 | 9 | −5 | 5 | | 0–3 | 1–3 | 1–0 | — |

Source: Soccerway

| 18 September 2012 1 | Málaga (Spain) | 3–0 | (Russia) Zenit St. Petersburg | Málaga, Spain |
| 22:45 MSK (UTC+4) | Isco 3', 76'; Saviola 13' | Report | | Stadium: La Rosaleda Stadium; Attendance: 23,670; Referee: Mark Clattenburg (England) |

| 3 October 2012 2 | Zenit St. Petersburg (Russia) | 2–3 | (Italy) Milan | Saint Petersburg, Russia |
| 20:00 MSK (UTC+4) | Hulk 45+2'; Shirokov 49' | Report | Emanuelson 13'; El Shaarawy 16'; Hubočan 75' (o.g.) | Stadium: Petrovsky Stadium; Attendance: 21,703; Referee: Felix Brych (Germany) |

| 24 October 2012 3 | Zenit St. Petersburg (Russia) | 1–0 | (Belgium) Anderlecht | Saint Petersburg, Russia |
| 20:00 MSK (UTC+4) | Kerzhakov 72' (pen.) | Report | | Stadium: Petrovsky Stadium; Attendance: 18,000; Referee: Ivan Bebek (Croatia) |

| 6 November 2012 4 | Anderlecht (Belgium) | 1–0 | (Russia) Zenit St. Petersburg | Anderlecht, Belgium |
| 23:45 MSK (UTC+4) | Mbokani 17' | Report | | Stadium: Constant Vanden Stock Stadium; Attendance: 16,437; Referee: Antony Gautier (France) |

| 21 November 2012 5 | Zenit St. Petersburg (Russia) | 2–2 | (Spain) Málaga | Saint Petersburg, Russia |
| 21:00 MSK (UTC+4) | Danny (yellow card) 28', (goal) 49'; Anyukov (yellow card) 66'; Alves (yellow card) 70'; Fayzulin 86'; Bystrov (red card) 90+5' | Report | Buonanotte 8', (yellow card) 36'; Fernández 9', (yellow card) 45+1'; Demichelis (yellow card) 14' | Stadium: Petrovsky Stadium; Attendance: 18,347; Referee: Olegário Benquerença (Portugal) |

| 4 December 2012 6 | Milan (Italy) | 0–1 | (Russia) Zenit St. Petersburg | Milan, Italy |
| 23:45 MSK (UTC+4) | | Report | Danny 35' | Stadium: San Siro; Attendance: 29,508; Referee: Tony Chapron (France) |

=== UEFA Europa League ===
==== Knockout phase ====
===== Round of 32 =====
| 14 February 2013 First leg | Zenit St. Petersburg (Russia) | 2–0 | (England) Liverpool | Saint Petersburg, Russia |
| 21:00 MSK (UTC+4) | Hulk 69'; Semak 72' | Report | | Stadium: Petrovsky Stadium; Attendance: 21,000; Referee: Carlos Velasco Carballo (Spain) |

| 22 February 2013 Second leg | Liverpool (England) | 3–1 (3–3 agg.) | (Russia) Zenit St. Petersburg | Liverpool, England |
| 00:05 MSK (UTC+4) | Suárez 28', 59'; Allen 43' | Report | Hulk 19' | Stadium: Anfield; Attendance: 43,026; Referee: Björn Kuipers (Netherlands) |

===== Round of 16 =====
| 8 March 2013 First leg | Basel (Switzerland) | 2–0 | (Russia) Zenit St. Petersburg | Basel, Switzerland |
| 00:05 MSK (UTC+4) | Díaz 83'; A. Frei 90+4' (pen.) | Report | Neto (red card) 90+3' | Stadium: St. Jakob-Park; Attendance: 15,008; Referee: Daniele Orsato (Italy) |

| 14 March 2013 Second leg | Zenit St. Petersburg (Russia) | 1–0 (1–2 agg.) | (Switzerland) Basel | Saint Petersburg, Russia |
| 21:00 MSK (UTC+4) | Witsel 30' | Report | Díaz (yellow card) 41' (yellow-red card) 45' | Stadium: Petrovsky Stadium; Attendance: 20,000; Referee: Paweł Gil (Poland) |

== Squad and statistics ==
As of 21 May 2013

=== Appearances and goals ===
| No. | Pos | Nat | Player | Total | | Premier League | | Russian Cup | | Champions League | | Europa League | |
| No. | Pos | Nat | Player | Apps | Goals | Apps | Goals | Apps | Goals | Apps | Goals | Apps | Goals |
|---|---|---|---|---|---|---|---|---|---|---|---|---|---|
| 2 | DF | (Russia) RUS | Aleksandr Anyukov | 33 | 1 | 21 | 1 | 4 | 0 | 5 | 0 | 3 | 0 |
| 3 | DF | (Portugal) POR | Bruno Alves | 28 | 2 | 19+1 | 1 | 2 | 1 | 3+2 | 0 | 1 | 0 |
| 4 | DF | (Italy) ITA | Domenico Criscito | 17 | 3 | 12 | 2 | 0+1 | 1 | 3 | 0 | 0+1 | 0 |
| 6 | DF | (Belgium) BEL | Nicolas Lombaerts | 33 | 0 | 20+1 | 0 | 2 | 0 | 6 | 0 | 4 | 0 |
| 9 | FW | (Russia) RUS | Aleksandr Bukharov | 14 | 1 | 2+7 | 1 | 1+2 | 0 | 0+1 | 0 | 0+1 | 0 |
| 10 | MF | (Portugal) POR | Danny | 20 | 4 | 9+2 | 2 | 2 | 0 | 2+1 | 2 | 4 | 0 |
| 11 | FW | (Russia) RUS | Aleksandr Kerzhakov | 30 | 11 | 18+3 | 10 | 1 | 0 | 5 | 1 | 2+1 | 0 |
| 13 | DF | (Portugal) POR | Luís Neto | 14 | 1 | 9 | 1 | 2 | 0 | 0 | 0 | 3 | 0 |
| 14 | DF | (Slovakia) SVK | Tomáš Hubočan | 34 | 0 | 22 | 0 | 3 | 0 | 5 | 0 | 4 | 0 |
| 15 | MF | (Russia) RUS | Roman Shirokov | 37 | 6 | 23+1 | 5 | 3 | 0 | 6 | 1 | 4 | 0 |
| 16 | GK | (Russia) RUS | Vyacheslav Malafeev | 38 | 0 | 25 | 0 | 4 | 0 | 6 | 0 | 3 | 0 |
| 18 | MF | (Russia) RUS | Konstantin Zyryanov | 33 | 6 | 15+11 | 6 | 3 | 0 | 1+3 | 0 | 0 | 0 |
| 20 | MF | (Russia) RUS | Viktor Fayzulin | 36 | 6 | 23+1 | 5 | 1+3 | 0 | 3+1 | 1 | 0+4 | 0 |
| 21 | DF | (Serbia) SRB | Milan Rodić | 6 | 0 | 3+1 | 0 | 0 | 0 | 0 | 0 | 1+1 | 0 |
| 24 | DF | (Serbia) SRB | Aleksandar Luković | 12 | 0 | 3+6 | 0 | 1+1 | 0 | 1 | 0 | 0 | 0 |
| 25 | MF | (Russia) RUS | Sergei Semak | 23 | 4 | 8+7 | 2 | 1+1 | 1 | 3 | 0 | 2+1 | 1 |
| 27 | MF | (Russia) RUS | Igor Denisov | 32 | 0 | 21+1 | 0 | 2 | 0 | 4 | 0 | 4 | 0 |
| 28 | MF | (Belgium) BEL | Axel Witsel | 31 | 5 | 16+3 | 4 | 3 | 0 | 5 | 0 | 4 | 1 |
| 29 | FW | (Brazil) BRA | Hulk | 29 | 11 | 17+1 | 7 | 3 | 1 | 4 | 1 | 4 | 2 |
| 30 | GK | (Belarus) BLR | Yuri Zhevnov | 3 | 0 | 2 | 0 | 0 | 0 | 0 | 0 | 1 | 0 |
| 34 | MF | (Russia) RUS | Vladimir Bystrov | 32 | 3 | 13+11 | 3 | 2 | 0 | 2+3 | 0 | 0+1 | 0 |
| 48 | FW | (Russia) RUS | Aleksei Gasilin | 1 | 0 | 0+1 | 0 | 0 | 0 | 0 | 0 | 0 | 0 |
| 50 | DF | (Russia) RUS | Igor Cheminava | 1 | 0 | 0+1 | 0 | 0 | 0 | 0 | 0 | 0 | 0 |
| 65 | MF | (Russia) RUS | Danila Yashchuk | 1 | 0 | 0+1 | 0 | 0 | 0 | 0 | 0 | 0 | 0 |
| 68 | MF | (Russia) RUS | Vyacheslav Zinkov | 1 | 0 | 0+1 | 0 | 0 | 0 | 0 | 0 | 0 | 0 |
| 71 | GK | (Russia) RUS | Yegor Baburin | 4 | 0 | 2+2 | 0 | 0 | 0 | 0 | 0 | 0 | 0 |
| 77 | FW | (Montenegro) MNE | Luka Đorđević | 10 | 0 | 2+5 | 0 | 0+2 | 0 | 0+1 | 0 | 0 | 0 |
| 85 | FW | (Russia) RUS | Pavel Mogilevets | 2 | 0 | 1+1 | 0 | 0 | 0 | 0 | 0 | 0 | 0 |
| 94 | MF | (Russia) RUS | Aleksei Yevseyev | 2 | 0 | 0+1 | 0 | 1 | 0 | 0 | 0 | 0 | 0 |
Players away from the club on loan:
Players who appeared for Zenit no longer at the club:
| 82 | DF | (Denmark) DEN | Michael Lumb | 3 | 0 | 0+1 | 0 | 0 | 0 | 0+2 | 0 | 0 | 0 |
| 55 | DF | (Russia) RUS | Renat Yanbayev | 12 | 1 | 7+3 | 1 | 2 | 0 | 0 | 0 | 0 | 0 |
| 99 | FW | (Russia) RUS | Maksim Kanunnikov | 14 | 1 | 3+6 | 1 | 1+1 | 0 | 0+3 | 0 | 0 | 0 |

=== Top scorers ===
| Place | Position | Nation | Number | Name | Russian Premier League | Russian Cup | Champions League | Europa League | Total |
|---|---|---|---|---|---|---|---|---|---|
| 1 | FW | (Russia) | 11 | Aleksandr Kerzhakov | 10 | 0 | 1 | 0 | 11 |
| 1 | FW | (Brazil) | 29 | Hulk | 7 | 1 | 1 | 2 | 11 |
| 3 | MF | (Russia) | 18 | Konstantin Zyryanov | 6 | 0 | 0 | 0 | 6 |
| 3 | DF | (Russia) | 15 | Roman Shirokov | 5 | 0 | 1 | 0 | 6 |
| 3 | MF | (Russia) | 20 | Viktor Fayzulin | 5 | 0 | 1 | 0 | 6 |
| 6 | MF | (Belgium) | 28 | Axel Witsel | 4 | 0 | 0 | 1 | 5 |
| 7 | MF | (Russia) | 25 | Sergei Semak | 2 | 1 | 0 | 1 | 4 |
| 7 | MF | (Portugal) | 10 | Danny | 2 | 0 | 2 | 0 | 4 |
| 9 | DF | (Italy) | 4 | Domenico Criscito | 2 | 1 | 0 | 0 | 3 |
| 9 | MF | (Russia) | 34 | Vladimir Bystrov | 3 | 0 | 0 | 0 | 3 |
| 11 | DF | (Portugal) | 3 | Bruno Alves | 1 | 1 | 0 | 0 | 2 |
| 12 | FW | (Russia) | 99 | Maksim Kanunnikov | 1 | 0 | 0 | 0 | 1 |
| 12 | DF | (Russia) | 2 | Aleksandr Anyukov | 1 | 0 | 0 | 0 | 1 |
| 12 | DF | (Russia) | 55 | Renat Yanbayev | 1 | 0 | 0 | 0 | 1 |
| 12 | FW | (Russia) | 9 | Aleksandr Bukharov | 1 | 0 | 0 | 0 | 1 |
| 12 | DF | (Portugal) | 13 | Luís Neto | 1 | 0 | 0 | 0 | 1 |
| | | | | TOTALS | 54 | 4 | 6 | 3 | 68 |

=== Disciplinary record ===
| Number | Nation | Position | Name | Russian Premier League | | Russian Cup | | Champions League | | Europa League | | Total | |
| Number | Nation | Position | Name | Yellow card | Red card | Yellow card | Red card | Yellow card | Red card | Yellow card | Red card | Yellow card | Red card |
| 2 | (Russia) | DF | Aleksandr Anyukov | 5 | 1 | 0 | 0 | 2 | 0 | 0 | 0 | 7 | 1 |
| 3 | (Portugal) | DF | Bruno Alves | 8 | 0 | 0 | 0 | 3 | 0 | 0 | 0 | 11 | 0 |
| 4 | (Italy) | DF | Domenico Criscito | 2 | 0 | 0 | 0 | 0 | 0 | 0 | 0 | 2 | 0 |
| 6 | (Belgium) | DF | Nicolas Lombaerts | 2 | 0 | 0 | 0 | 1 | 0 | 0 | 0 | 3 | 0 |
| 9 | (Russia) | FW | Aleksandr Bukharov | 2 | 0 | 0 | 0 | 0 | 0 | 0 | 0 | 2 | 0 |
| 10 | (Portugal) | MF | Danny | 4 | 1 | 0 | 0 | 1 | 0 | 0 | 0 | 5 | 1 |
| 11 | (Russia) | FW | Aleksandr Kerzhakov | 1 | 0 | 0 | 0 | 0 | 0 | 1 | 0 | 2 | 0 |
| 13 | (Portugal) | DF | Luís Neto | 3 | 0 | 1 | 0 | 0 | 0 | 1 | 1 | 5 | 1 |
| 14 | (Slovakia) | DF | Tomáš Hubočan | 7 | 0 | 1 | 0 | 2 | 0 | 1 | 0 | 11 | 0 |
| 15 | (Russia) | MF | Roman Shirokov | 3 | 1 | 1 | 0 | 2 | 0 | 1 | 0 | 7 | 1 |
| 16 | (Russia) | GK | Vyacheslav Malafeev | 1 | 0 | 0 | 0 | 0 | 0 | 0 | 0 | 1 | 0 |
| 18 | (Slovakia) | MF | Konstantin Zyryanov | 2 | 0 | 1 | 0 | 0 | 0 | 0 | 0 | 3 | 0 |
| 20 | (Russia) | MF | Viktor Fayzulin | 2 | 0 | 1 | 0 | 2 | 0 | 0 | 0 | 5 | 0 |
| 21 | (Serbia) | DF | Milan Rodić | 2 | 0 | 0 | 0 | 0 | 0 | 0 | 0 | 2 | 0 |
| 25 | (Russia) | MF | Sergei Semak | 1 | 0 | 0 | 0 | 0 | 0 | 0 | 0 | 1 | 0 |
| 27 | (Russia) | MF | Igor Denisov | 2 | 0 | 0 | 0 | 0 | 0 | 2 | 0 | 4 | 0 |
| 28 | (Belgium) | MF | Axel Witsel | 5 | 0 | 0 | 0 | 1 | 0 | 2 | 0 | 8 | 0 |
| 29 | (Brazil) | FW | Hulk | 8 | 0 | 1 | 0 | 2 | 0 | 0 | 0 | 11 | 0 |
| 34 | (Russia) | MF | Vladimir Bystrov | 2 | 0 | 0 | 0 | 0 | 1 | 0 | 0 | 2 | 1 |
| 55 | (Russia) | DF | Renat Yanbayev | 1 | 0 | 0 | 0 | 0 | 0 | 0 | 0 | 1 | 0 |
| 77 | (Montenegro) | FW | Luka Đorđević | 1 | 0 | 0 | 0 | 0 | 0 | 0 | 0 | 1 | 0 |
| | | | TOTALS | 63 | 3 | 7 | 0 | 16 | 1 | 8 | 1 | 94 | 5 |
