= Kaio Pantaleão =

Brazilian footballer (born 1995)

Kaio
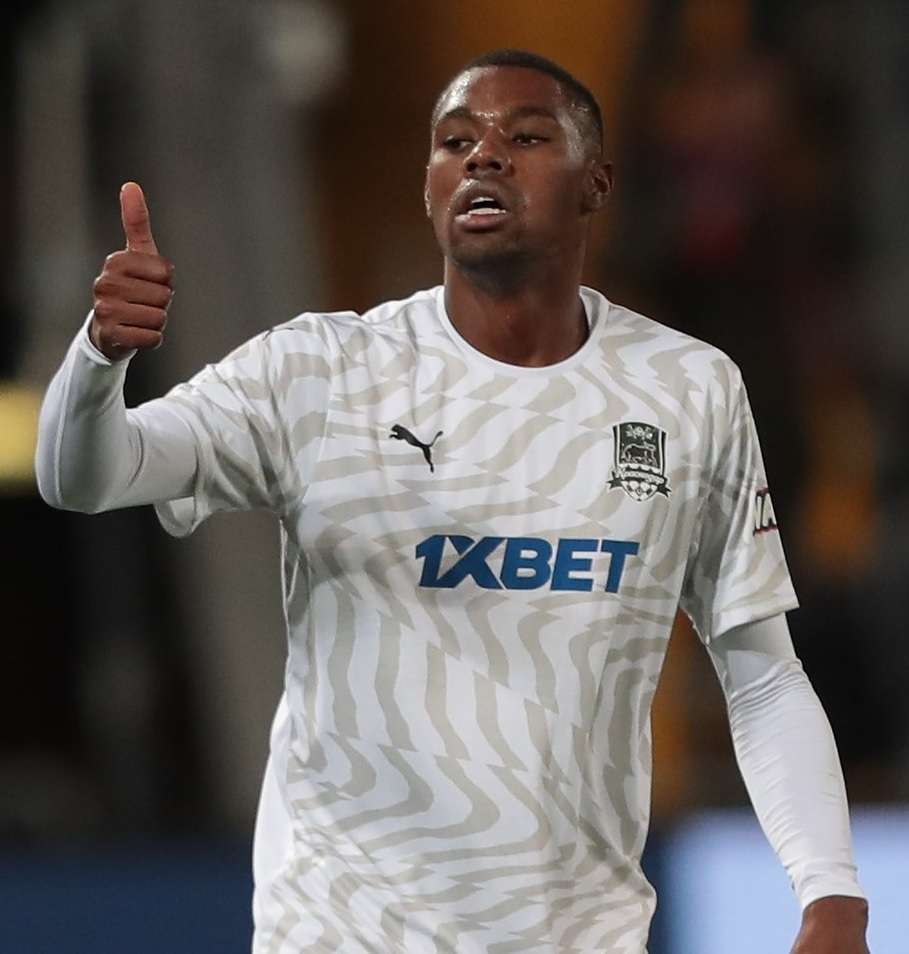
- Kaio with FC Krasnodar in 2019

Personal information
- Full name: Kaio Fernando da Silva Pantaleão
- Date of birth: 8 September 1995 (age 31)
- Place of birth: Araraquara, Brazil
- Height: 1.86 m (6 ft 1 in)
- Position: Centre-back

Team information
- Current team: Botafogo
- Number: 31

Youth career
- –2015: Ferroviária
- 2015: → Atlético Paranaense (loan)

Senior career*
Years	Team	Apps	(Gls)
2014–2018	Ferroviária	4	(0)
2017–2018	→ Santa Clara (loan)	14	(0)
2018–2019	Santa Clara	22	(0)
2019–2020	Krasnodar-2	6	(0)
2019–2025	Krasnodar	96	(3)
2025–	Botafogo	11	(0)
- * Club domestic league appearances and goals as of 13 December 2025

Kaio Fernando da Silva Pantaleão (born 8 September 1995), known mononymously as Kaio, is a Brazilian professional footballer who plays as a centre-back for Brazilian club Botafogo.

== Career ==
Born in Araraquara, Brazil, Kaio is product of local Ferroviária youth ranks. On 22 July 2017, he started his first experience abroad, joining Santa Clara on a one-year loan deal. He made his debut for the Azorean team on 13 August 2017, in a 2–1 home win against Sporting da Covilhã.

Before the 2018–19 season, Santa Clara bought out his rights.

=== Krasnodar ===
On 20 May 2019, he signed a five-year contract with Russian Premier League club FC Krasnodar. On 3 March 2022, following the Russian invasion of Ukraine, Krasnodar announced that his contract was suspended and he would not train with the team, but the contract was not terminated and remained valid. Kaio returned to the club in June 2022.

After having spent the last six seasons defending FK Krasnodar, he ended his time in Russia with 124 appearances and four goals. Last season, however, the defender lost his absolute starting place at Krasnodar and took to the field 13 times in the campaign that ended with the club's first Russian title in history.

=== Botafogo ===
On 5 June 2025, Botafogo made the arrival of Kaio Pantaleão official, he signed a contract with Glorioso valid for three years, therefore, going until June 2028. He will wear the name Kaio Fernando on the number 31 shirt.

== Career statistics ==
As of match played 10 May 2025

Appearances and goals by club, season and competition
Club	Season	League			Cup		Continental		Other		Total	
Club	Season	Division	Apps	Goals	Apps	Goals	Apps	Goals	Apps	Goals	Apps	Goals
Ferroviária	2013	Paulista Série A2	—		—		—		11 (Note: Appearances in Copa Paulista)	2	11	2
Ferroviária	2014	Paulista Série A2	—		—		—		11 (Note: 10 appearances in Copa Paulista, 1 appearance in Paulista Série A2)	0	11	0
Athletico Paranaense	2015	Paranaense	—		—		—		0	0	0	0
Ferroviária	2016	Paulista	—		2	0	—		20	2	22	2
Ferroviária	2017	Paulista	—		—		—		3 (Note: Appearances in Campeonato Paulista)	0	3	0
Ferroviária	Total		0	0	2	0	0	0	45	4	47	4
Santa Clara	2017–18	LigaPro	14	0	4	0	—		—		18	0
Santa Clara	2018–19	Primeira Liga	22	0	1	0	—		1 (Note: Appearance in Taça da Liga)	0	24	0
Santa Clara	Total		36	0	5	0	0	0	1	0	42	0
Krasnodar-2	2019–20	Russian Football National League	6	0	—		—		—		6	0
Krasnodar	2019–20	Russian Premier League	11	0	1	0	0	0	—		12	0
Krasnodar	2020–21	Russian Premier League	24	1	0	0	10 (Note: 8 appearances in the UEFA Champions League, 2 appearances in the UEFA Europa League)	0	—		34	1
Krasnodar	2021–22	Russian Premier League	16	0	0	0	—		—		16	0
Krasnodar	2022–23	Russian Premier League	20	0	8	1	—		—		28	1
Krasnodar	2023–24	Russian Premier League	12	1	2	0	—		—		14	1
Krasnodar	2024–25	Russian Premier League	13	1	5	0	—		1 (Note: Appearance in Russian Super Cup)	0	19	1
Krasnodar	Total		96	3	16	1	10	0	1	0	123	4
Career total			138	3	22	1	10	0	47	4	218	8

== Honours ==
Krasnodar

- Russian Premier League: 2024–25
