= FC Zenit Penza =

Russian football club

- Full name: Football Club Zenit Penza
- Founded: 1918; 108 years ago
- Ground: Zenit Stadium
- Capacity: 960
- Owner: Penza
- Chairman: Dmitry Sergeyev
- Manager: Maksim Igoshin
- League: Russian Second League, Division B, Group 3
- 2026: 13th
- Website: zenit-penza.ru
Home colours	Away colours	Third colours

FC Zenit Penza (Russian: «Зенит» (Пенза)) is a Russian football club based in Penza. It played professionally in 1948–49, 1961–1973, 1990–1999, 2002–2008, 2010–2017 and from 2021. It played on the second-highest level in the Soviet First League in 1948–1949 and 1960–1962, where its best result was 8th place in Zone 3 in 1961. In 2009, it played in the Amateur Football League which it won and was promoted to the Russian Second Division for 2010. It dropped out the third-tier PFL during the winter break of the 2017–18 season. It re-entered the third tier for the 2021–22 season.

== Current squad ==
As of 11 September 2026, according to the Second League website.

Note: Flags indicate national team as defined under FIFA eligibility rules; some limited exceptions apply. Players may hold more than one non-FIFA nationality.

No.	Pos.	Nation	Player
1	GK	RUS	Timur Zaynullin
2	DF	RUS	Zakhar Kostyukhin
3	DF	RUS	Gleb Geykin
5	MF	RUS	Ilya Kurakin
6	MF	RUS	Dmitry Bitel
7	MF	RUS	Elkhan Shamsudinov
8	MF	RUS	Artyom Serebryakov
9	FW	RUS	Aleksandr Kukharchuk
10	MF	RUS	Denis Skrypnikov
11	FW	RUS	Nikita Kolesin
16	GK	RUS	Ilya Gorunov
17	MF	RUS	Yevgeny Yegorov
18	MF	RUS	Sergei Peterson
19	MF	RUS	Daniil Kashmin
20	DF	RUS	Aleksandr Dementyev

No.	Pos.	Nation	Player
21	DF	RUS	Aleksandr Vezikov
25	MF	RUS	Oleg Sarinov
26	DF	RUS	Yevgeny Aleksandrov
38	FW	RUS	Maksim Poptsov
39	MF	RUS	Yegor Kolodyazhny
45	MF	RUS	Artyom Erdenko
55	DF	RUS	Kirill Gorbatov
58	GK	RUS	Semyon Abramov
64	DF	RUS	Anton Yegorushkin (on loan from Sokol Saratov)
69	DF	RUS	Yaroslav Terechev
71	FW	RUS	Aleksandr Rodionov
73	MF	RUS	Grigory Loskov
77	DF	RUS	Ivan Belik
88	MF	RUS	Maksim Krasnopyorov
99	FW	RUS	Ivan Polumysko

== Team name history ==
- 1918–1926: KLS Penza (Klub Lyubiteley Sporta – Sport Lovers Club)
- 1927: Rabochiy Klub Penza
- 1927–1929: Zavod N50 Penza
- 1930–1935: ZIF Penza
- 1936–1947: FC Zenit Penza
- 1948–1959: FC Spartak Penza
- 1960–1963: FC Zarya Penza
- 1964–1965: FC Trud Penza
- 1966: FC Velozavodets Penza
- 1967–1971: FC Khimmashevets Penza
- 1972–1973: FC Sura Penza
- 1973–1978: FC Granit Penza
- 1979: FC SKA Penza
- 1980–1991: FC Granit Penza
- 1992–present: FC Zenit Penza
