= Daniil Utkin =

Russian footballer

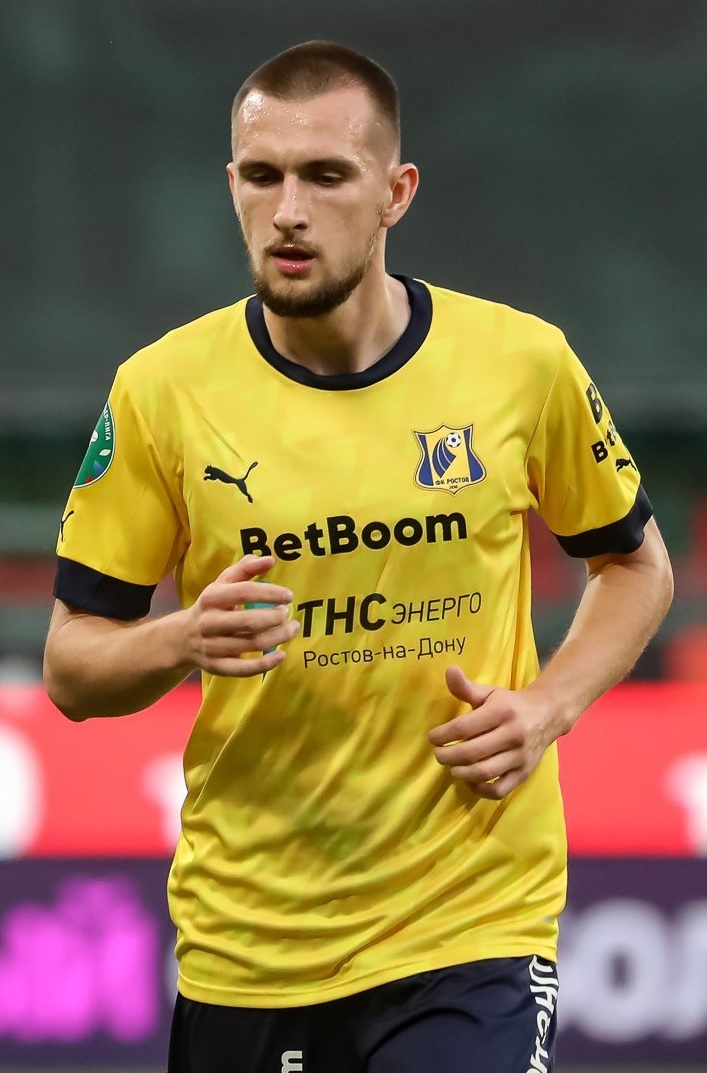
- Utkin with Rostov in 2022

Personal information
- Full name: Daniil Pavlovich Utkin
- Date of birth: 12 October 1999 (age 27)
- Place of birth: Aksay, Russia
- Height: 1.83 m (6 ft 0 in)
- Position: Midfielder

Team information
- Current team: Krasnodar
- Number: 47

Youth career
- 2005–2006: SKA Rostov-on-Don
- 2006–2009: Viktor Ponedelnik Academy
- 2009–2010: FC Maxima
- 2010–2017: Krasnodar

Senior career*
Years	Team	Apps	(Gls)
2018–2022	Krasnodar	49	(6)
2018–2021	→ Krasnodar-2	34	(12)
2021–2022	→ Akhmat Grozny (loan)	28	(9)
2022–2026	Rostov	56	(4)
2024–2025	→ Akhmat Grozny (loan)	16	(1)
2025–2026	→ Baltika Kaliningrad (loan)	1	(0)
2026	→ Torpedo Moscow (loan)	13	(3)
2026–	Krasnodar	14	(1)

International career^{‡}
2015	Russia U-16	3	(1)
2015–2016	Russia U-17	11	(0)
2016–2017	Russia U-18	13	(5)
2017	Russia U-19	6	(3)
2019–2020	Russia U-21	10	(1)
2022–	Russia	2	(1)
- * Club domestic league appearances and goals as of 22 November 2026 ‡ National team caps and goals as of 24 September 2022

Daniil Pavlovich Utkin (Russian: Дании́л Па́влович У́ткин; born 12 October 1999) is a Russian football player who plays as a central midfielder for Krasnodar and the Russia national team.

== Club career ==
Utkin made his Russian Professional Football League debut for Krasnodar-2 on 10 March 2018 in a game against Chayka Peschanokopskoye.

He made his first appearance for the main squad of Krasnodar on 1 November 2018 in a Russian Cup game against Krylia Sovetov Samara.

He made his Russian Premier League debut for Krasnodar on 9 December 2018 in a game against Ufa as a 82nd-minute substitute for Viktor Claesson.

On 11 June 2021, he joined Akhmat Grozny on loan until 31 May 2022.

On 16 June 2022, Utkin signed a four-year contract with Rostov.

On 11 September 2024, Utkin returned to Akhmat Grozny on loan. On 12 June 2025, he joined Baltika Kaliningrad on a season-long loan. On 13 February 2026, he moved on a new loan to Torpedo Moscow.

On 19 June 2026, Utkin returned to Krasnodar on a three-year contract.

== International career ==
Utkin was called up to the Russia national football team for the first time for a friendly against Kyrgyzstan in September 2022. He made his debut on 24 September 2022 in that game and scored the winning goal in the 89th minute.

== Career statistics ==
=== Club ===
As of match played 22 November 2026

Appearances and goals by club, season and competition
Club	Season	League			Cup		Europe		Other		Total	
Club	Season	Division	Apps	Goals	Apps	Goals	Apps	Goals	Apps	Goals	Apps	Goals
Krasnodar-2	2016–17	Russian Second League	—		—		—		2 (Note: Appearances in the FNL Cup)	1	2	1
Krasnodar-2	2017–18	Russian Second League	2	0	—		—		3	1	5	1
Krasnodar-2	2018–19	Russian First League	25	10	—		—		2	0	27	10
Krasnodar-2	2019–20	Russian First League	6	2	—		—		—		6	2
Krasnodar-2	2020–21	Russian First League	1	0	—		—		—		1	0
Krasnodar-2	Total		34	12	—		—		7	2	41	14
Krasnodar	2018–19	Russian Premier League	7	1	2	0	0	0	—		9	1
Krasnodar	2019–20	Russian Premier League	22	4	1	0	6 (Note: One appearance, one goal in the UEFA Champions League, five appearances in the UEFA Europa League)	1	—		29	5
Krasnodar	2020–21	Russian Premier League	20	1	0	0	6 (Note: Appearances in the UEFA Champions League)	0	—		26	1
Krasnodar	Total		49	6	3	0	12	1	—		64	7
Akhmat Grozny (loan)	2021–22	Russian Premier League	28	9	1	1	—		—		29	10
Rostov	2022–23	Russian Premier League	27	3	8	0	—		—		35	3
Rostov	2023–24	Russian Premier League	24	1	7	0	—		—		31	1
Rostov	2024–25	Russian Premier League	5	0	2	0	—		—		7	0
Rostov	Total		56	4	17	0	—		—		73	4
Akhmat Grozny (loan)	2024–25	Russian Premier League	16	1	5	0	—		—		21	1
Akhmat Grozny (loan)	Club total		44	10	6	1	—		—		50	11
Baltika Kaliningrad (loan)	2025–26	Russian Premier League	1	0	1	0	—		—		2	0
Torpedo Moscow (loan)	2025–26	Russian First League	13	3	—		—		—		13	3
Krasnodar	2026–27	Russian Premier League	14	1	4	1	—		—		18	2
Krasnodar	Club total		63	7	7	1	12	1	—		82	9
Career total			211	36	31	2	12	1	7	2	261	41

=== International ===
As of match played 17 November 2022

Appearances and goals by national team and year
National team	Year	Apps	Goals
Russia	2022	2	1
Total		2	1

=== International goals ===
Scores and results list Russia's goal tally first, score column indicates score after each Utkin goal.

List of international goals scored by Daniil Utkin
No.	Date	Venue	Opponent	Score	Result	Competition
1	24 September 2022	Dolen Omurzakov Stadium, Bishkek, Kyrgyzstan	Kyrgyzstan	2–1	2–1	Friendly

== Personal life ==
Daniil confirmed that he converted to Islam while playing for Rostov.
