= Yegor Baburin =

Russian footballer (born 1993)

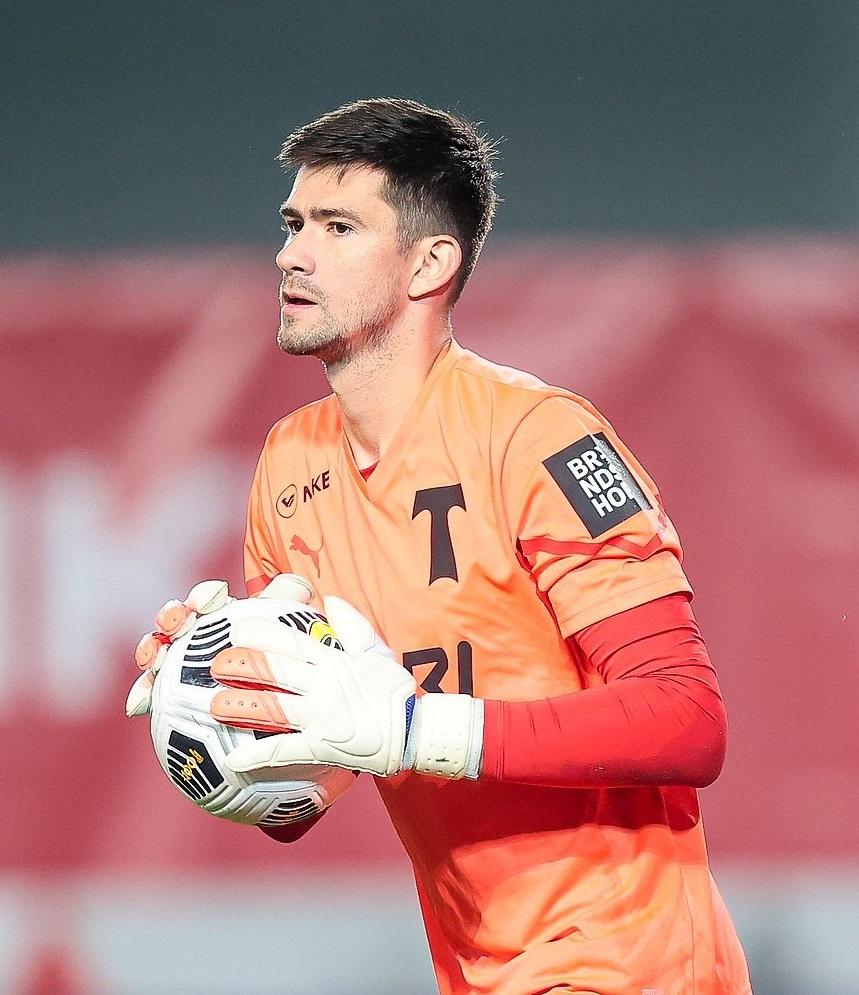
- Baburin with Torpedo Moscow in 2022

Personal information
- Full name: Yegor Konstantinovich Baburin
- Date of birth: 9 August 1993 (age 33)
- Place of birth: Chernihiv, Ukraine
- Height: 1.91 m (6 ft 3 in)
- Position: Goalkeeper

Team information
- Current team: Volga Ulyanovsk
- Number: 23

Youth career
- 2003–2009: DYuSSh Smena-Zenit
- 2010–2012: Zenit Saint Petersburg

Senior career*
Years	Team	Apps	(Gls)
2013–2019	Zenit Saint Petersburg	6	(0)
2013–2017	→ Zenit-2 Saint Petersburg	89	(0)
2018–2019	→ Rubin Kazan (loan)	6	(0)
2019–2023	Rostov	19	(0)
2021	→ Krasnodar (loan)	2	(0)
2022–2023	→ Torpedo Moscow (loan)	21	(0)
2023–2026	Torpedo Moscow	46	(0)
2026–	Volga Ulyanovsk	13	(0)

International career
2013–2014	Russia U-21	5	(0)
- * Club domestic league appearances and goals as of 16 May 2026

Yegor Konstantinovich Baburin (Russian: Егор Константинович Бабурин; born 9 August 1993) is a Russian professional football goalkeeper who plays for Volga Ulyanovsk.

== Club career ==
He made his debut in the Russian Premier League on 17 March 2013 for Zenit St. Petersburg in a game against FC Mordovia Saransk. First choice Zenit goalkeeper Vyacheslav Malafeev was injured before the game. Baburin entered the pitch after 10 minutes of play when Yuri Zhevnov who started the game picked up the muscle strain.

On 1 August 2018, he extended his contract with Zenit for 3 additional seasons. On 29 August 2018, he joined FC Rubin Kazan on loan for the 2018–19 season.

On 12 July 2019, he signed a 4-year contract with FC Rostov.

On 25 February 2021, he moved to Russian club FC Krasnodar, on a loan deal until the end of the season. On 16 July 2022, Baburin joined FC Torpedo Moscow on loan.

On 21 June 2023, Baburin moved to FC Torpedo Moscow on a permanent basis and signed a three-year contract with the club.

== Honours ==
Zenit Saint Petersburg

- Russian Football Premier League: 2014–15
- Russian Cup: 2015–16

== Career statistics ==
As of 24 May 2025

Club	Season	League			Cup		Continental		Other		Total	
Club	Season	Division	Apps	Goals	Apps	Goals	Apps	Goals	Apps	Goals	Apps	Goals
Zenit St. Petersburg	2012–13	Russian Premier League	4	0	0	0	0	0	–		4	0
Zenit St. Petersburg	2013–14	Russian Premier League	0	0	1	0	0	0	–		1	0
Zenit St. Petersburg	2014–15	Russian Premier League	1	0	0	0	0	0	–		1	0
Zenit St. Petersburg	2016–17	Russian Premier League	0	0	0	0	0	0	–		0	0
Zenit St. Petersburg	2017–18	Russian Premier League	1	0	0	0	0	0	–		1	0
Zenit St. Petersburg	Total		6	0	1	0	0	0	0	0	7	0
Zenit-2 St. Petersburg	2013–14	Russian Second League	4	0	–		–		–		4	0
Zenit-2 St. Petersburg	2014–15	Russian Second League	7	0	–		–		–		7	0
Zenit-2 St. Petersburg	2015–16	Russian First League	22	0	–		–		2 (Note: Appearances in the FNL Cup)	0	24	0
Zenit-2 St. Petersburg	2016–17	Russian First League	35	0	–		–		–		35	0
Zenit-2 St. Petersburg	2017–18	Russian First League	21	0	–		–		–		21	0
Zenit-2 St. Petersburg	Total		89	0	0	0	0	0	2	0	91	0
Rubin Kazan	2018–19	Russian Premier League	6	0	3	0	–		–		9	0
Rostov	2019–20	Russian Premier League	12	0	0	0	–		–		12	0
Rostov	2020–21	Russian Premier League	4	0	0	0	0	0	–		4	0
Rostov	2021–22	Russian Premier League	3	0	2	0	–		–		5	0
Rostov	Total		19	0	2	0	0	0	0	0	21	0
Krasnodar (loan)	2020–21	Russian Premier League	2	0	–		–		–		2	0
Torpedo Moscow (loan)	2022–23	Russian Premier League	21	0	2	0	–		–		23	0
Torpedo Moscow	2023–24	Russian First League	28	0	1	0	–		–		29	0
Torpedo Moscow	2024–25	Russian First League	12	0	0	0	–		–		12	0
Torpedo Moscow	Total		40	0	1	0	0	0	0	0	41	0
Career total			183	0	9	0	0	0	2	0	194	0
