= Sergei Peterson =

Russian footballer

Personal information
- Full name: Sergei Vladislavovich Peterson
- Date of birth: 10 January 2001 (age 25)
- Place of birth: Vyselki, Russia
- Height: 1.82 m (6 ft 0 in)
- Position: Midfielder

Team information
- Current team: Zenit Penza
- Number: 18

Youth career
- –2019: Krasnodar

Senior career*
Years	Team	Apps	(Gls)
2017–2021	Krasnodar-2	5	(0)
2018–2021	Krasnodar-3	39	(4)
2021–2022	Zenit-Izhevsk	19	(0)
2022–2023	Tver	24	(0)
2023–2024	Pobeda Khasavyurt	17	(1)
2024–2025	Oryol	44	(0)
2026–	Zenit Penza	8	(0)

International career^{‡}
2017	Russia U17	7	(0)
- * Club domestic league appearances and goals as of 31 October 2026 ‡ National team caps and goals as of 14 November 2017

Sergei Vladislavovich Peterson (Russian: Сергей Владиславович Петерсон; born 10 January 2001) is a Russian football player who plays for Zenit Penza.

== Club career ==
He made his debut in the Russian Football National League for Krasnodar-2 on 4 October 2020 in a game against Nizhny Novgorod.
