= Arutyun Grigoryan =

Russian footballer

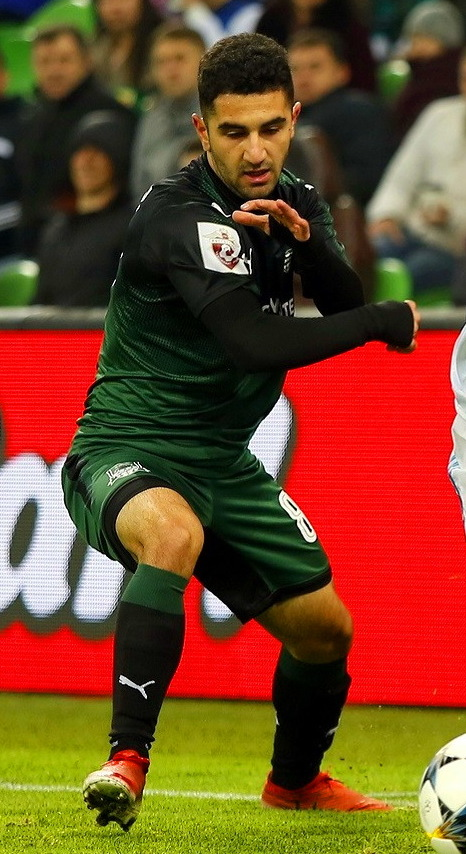

Personal information
- Full name: Arutyun Artakovich Grigoryan
- Date of birth: 19 May 1998 (age 28)
- Place of birth: Gyumri, Armenia
- Height: 1.65 m (5 ft 5 in)
- Positions: Winger; attacking midfielder

Youth career
- 2014–2018: FC Krasnodar

Senior career*
Years	Team	Apps	(Gls)
2014–2021	FC Krasnodar-2	128	(14)
2018–2019	→ FC Krasnodar-3	5	(0)
2020	→ Mladá Boleslav (loan)	0	(0)
2021–2022	FC Tver	23	(3)
2022–2023	FC Arsenal Tula	21	(1)
2023	FC Arsenal-2 Tula	5	(1)
2023	FC Chayka Peschanokopskoye	16	(0)
2024	FC Mashuk-KMV Pyatigorsk	11	(0)
- * Club domestic league appearances and goals as of 8 June 2024

Arutyun Artakovich Grigoryan (Russian: Арутюн Артакович Григорян; born 19 May 1998) is a Russian football player.

== Career ==
=== Club career ===
He made his debut in the Russian Professional Football League for FC Krasnodar-2 on 9 April 2015 in a game against FC Astrakhan. He made his Russian Football National League debut for Krasnodar-2 on 29 July 2018 in a game against FC Mordovia Saransk.

On 3 January 2020 FC Krasnodar announced that he's been loaned to Czech club FK Mladá Boleslav until the end of 2020.
