= Yevgeni Nazarov =

Russian footballer

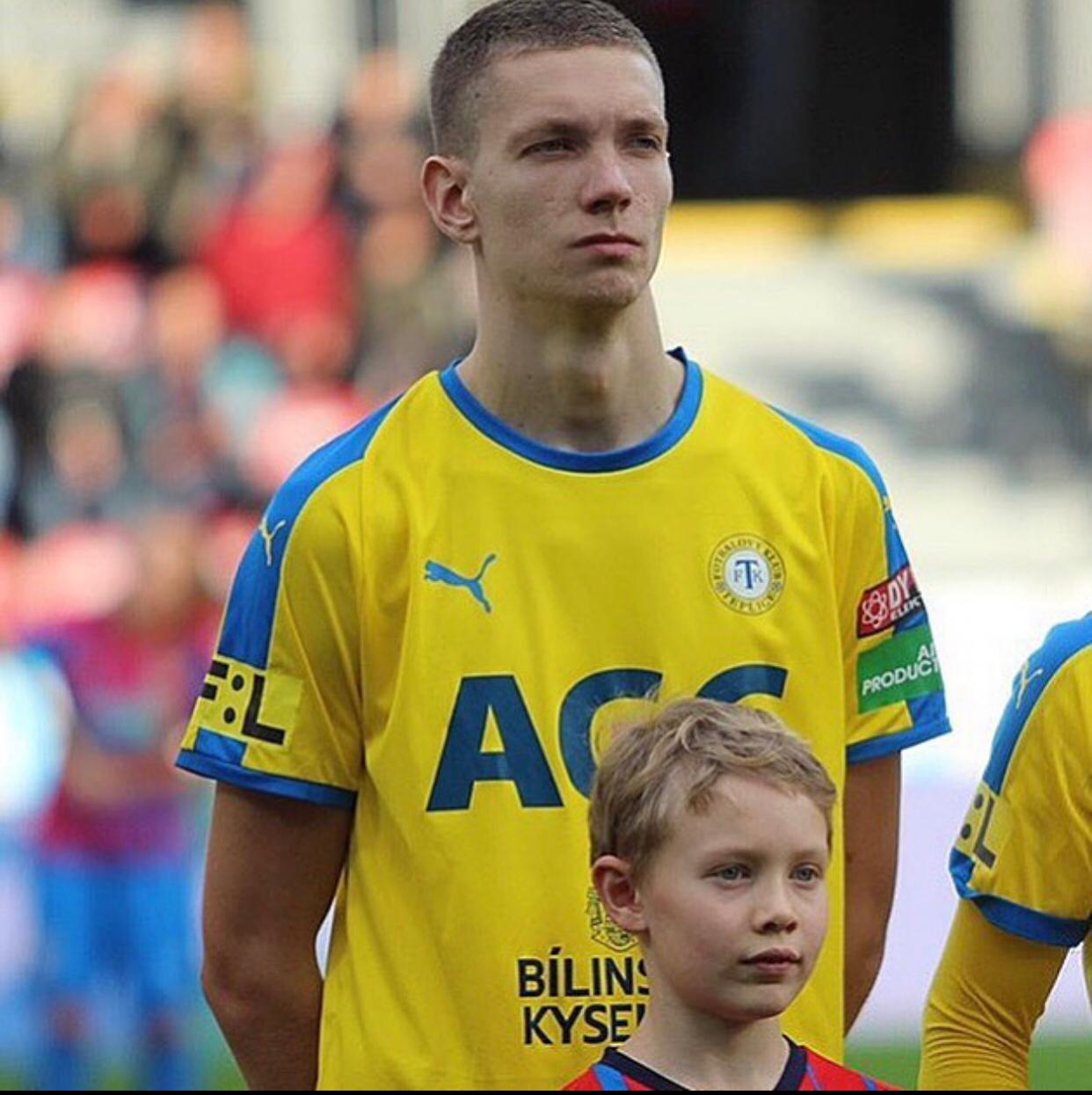

Personal information
- Full name: Yevgeni Nikolayevich Nazarov
- Date of birth: 7 April 1997 (age 29)
- Place of birth: Neftekumsk, Russia
- Height: 1.93 m (6 ft 4 in)
- Position: Centre back

Youth career
- –2009: Torpedo Taganrog
- 2009–2015: Viktor Ponedelnik Academy Rostov-on-Don
- 2015–2019: Krasnodar

Senior career*
Years	Team	Apps	(Gls)
2016–2017	Krasnodar	0	(0)
2017–2021	Krasnodar-2	70	(4)
2018–2019	Krasnodar-3	15	(1)
2019–2020	→ Teplice (loan)	18	(1)
2021	→ SKA-Khabarovsk (loan)	8	(0)
2022	Bohemians 1905	1	(0)
2022	Urartu	2	(0)
2023	Dinamo Samarqand	6	(0)
2023	Amkal Moscow		
2024	Chayka Peschanokopskoye	2	(0)

International career
2017	Russia U-21	2	(0)
- * Club domestic league appearances and goals as of 8 June 2024

Yevgeni Nikolayevich Nazarov (Russian: Евгений Николаевич Назаров; born 7 April 1997) is a Russian football player.

== Club career ==
Nazarov made his debut in the Russian Professional Football League for Krasnodar-2 on 29 July 2016 in a game against Sochi. In the 2016–17 season, he was called up to the main squad of FC Krasnodar for two Russian Cup games, but remained on the bench. He made his Russian Football National League debut for Krasnodar-2 on 8 August 2018 in a game against Tambov.

On 14 June 2019, he joined Czech club Teplice on loan.

On 25 January 2022, Nazarov signed a one-year contract with Bohemians 1905 in the Czech Republic.

On 23 July 2022, Urartu announced the signing of Nazarov. Nazarov left Urartu less than two months later, on 1 September 2022 having played twice for the club.
