= Maksim Plopa =

Moldovan-Russian footballer

Personal information
- Full name: Maksim Mikhailovich Plopa
- Date of birth: 23 January 1990 (age 36)
- Place of birth: Bălţi, Moldovan SSR
- Height: 1.88 m (6 ft 2 in)
- Position: Defender

Senior career*
| Years | Team | Apps | (Gls) |
| 2008 | FC Khimki | 0 | (0) |
| 2009–2010 | FC Saturn Moscow Oblast | 0 | (0) |
| 2011–2015 | FC Baltika Kaliningrad | 108 | (2) |
| 2015–2017 | FC Sibir Novosibirsk | 69 | (3) |
| 2018 | FC Orenburg | 1 | (0) |
| 2018–2021 | FC Baltika Kaliningrad | 42 | (0) |
| 2021–2022 | FC Novosibirsk | 27 | (1) |
| 2022–2024 | FC Murom | 32 | (0) |
- * Club domestic league appearances and goals

Maksim Mikhailovich Plopa (Russian: Максим Михайлович Плопа; born 23 January 1990) is a Moldovan-Russian former football player who played as a centre-back.

== Career ==
Plopa was a registered Khimki player in the 2008 Russian Premier League season, but only played for the reserves. He made his professional debut for Saturn on 15 July 2009 in the Russian Cup game against FC Luch-Energiya Vladivostok.

He made his Russian Football National League debut for FC Baltika Kaliningrad on 27 June 2011 in a game against FC Nizhny Novgorod.
