= German Osnov =

Russian footballer

Personal information
- Date of birth: 7 May 2001 (age 25)
- Place of birth: Luhansk, Ukraine
- Height: 1.85 m (6 ft 1 in)
- Position: Left-back

Youth career
- 2014–2017: Dynamo Moscow
- 2017–2019: Lokomotiv Moscow

Senior career*
Years	Team	Apps	(Gls)
2018–2020	Lokomotiv Moscow	0	(0)
2020	→ Akron Tolyatti (loan)	0	(0)
2020	→ Energetik-BGU Minsk (loan)	3	(0)
2021	Krasnodar	0	(0)
2021	→ Krasnodar-2	2	(0)
2021	→ Krasnodar-3	10	(0)
2021	Chayka Peschanokopskoye	2	(0)
2021–2022	Novosibirsk	15	(0)
2022–2024	Rodina Moscow	0	(0)
2022–2024	Rodina-2 Moscow	32	(0)
2024	→ Chelyabinsk (loan)	0	(0)
2024	Avangard Kursk	1	(0)

International career
2016–2017	Russia U17	5	(1)
- * Club domestic league appearances and goals as of 16 August 2024

German Nikolayevich Osnov (Russian: Герман Николаевич Основ; born 7 May 2001) is a Russian footballer.
