= Danil Benedyk =

Russian footballer

Personal information
- Full name: Danil Ivanovich Benedyk
- Date of birth: 5 March 2001 (age 25)
- Height: 1.68 m (5 ft 6 in)
- Position: Midfielder

Senior career*
Years	Team	Apps	(Gls)
2018–2021	FC Krasnodar-3	33	(2)
2020–2021	FC Krasnodar-2	2	(0)
2021–2022	PFC Spartak Nalchik	13	(1)

International career^{‡}
2016	Russia U-16	3	(0)
- * Club domestic league appearances and goals as of 5 June 2022 ‡ National team caps and goals as of 29 October 2016

Danil Ivanovich Benedyk (Russian: Данил Иванович Бенедык; born 5 March 2001) is a Russian football player.

== Club career ==
He made his debut in the Russian Football National League for FC Krasnodar-2 on 4 October 2020 in a game against FC Nizhny Novgorod.
