= Maksim Igoshin =

Russian footballer and manager

Personal information
- Full name: Maksim Vladimirovich Igoshin
- Date of birth: 10 April 1978 (age 48)
- Height: 1.75 m (5 ft 9 in)
- Positions: Defender; midfielder

Team information
- Current team: FC Zenit Penza (manager)

Youth career
- DYuSSh-4 Penza

Senior career*
Years	Team	Apps	(Gls)
1997–1999	FC Zenit Penza	81	(3)
2000–2004	FC Volga Ulyanovsk	116	(0)
2005–2006	FC Chita	46	(0)
2006–2008	FC Zvezda Irkutsk	77	(0)
2009–2010	FC Metallurg-Yenisey Krasnoyarsk	46	(0)
2011–2012	FC Volga Ulyanovsk	23	(0)
2012–2017	FC Zenit Penza	84	(0)

Managerial career
- 2017–2022: FC Zenit Penza (assistant)
- 2022–2023: FC Zenit Penza (assistant)
- 2024–2025: FC Dorozhnik Kamenka
- 2026: FC Zenit Penza (assistant)
- 2026–: FC Zenit Penza
- * Club domestic league appearances and goals

Maksim Vladimirovich Igoshin (Russian: Максим Владимирович Игошин; born 10 April 1978) is a Russian professional football manager and a former player who is the manager of FC Zenit Penza.

== Club career ==
He played 3 seasons in the Russian Football National League for FC Chita and FC Zvezda Irkutsk.
