= Roman Simonov =

Russian footballer

Personal information
- Full name: Roman Dmitriyevich Simonov
- Date of birth: 9 August 2001 (age 25)
- Height: 1.74 m (5 ft 9 in)
- Position: Forward

Youth career
- –2019: FC Krasnodar

Senior career*
Years	Team	Apps	(Gls)
2018–2021	FC Krasnodar-3	45	(9)
2020–2021	FC Krasnodar-2	5	(0)
2021–2022	FC Zenit-Izhevsk	26	(2)
2022–2023	FC Amkar Perm	23	(1)
- * Club domestic league appearances and goals as of 4 June 2023

Roman Dmitriyevich Simonov (Russian: Роман Дмитриевич Симонов; born 9 August 2001) is a Russian football player.

== Club career ==
He made his debut in the Russian Football National League for FC Krasnodar-2 on 4 October 2020 in a game against FC Nizhny Novgorod.
