= 2022–23 FC Krasnodar season =

FC Krasnodar
2022–23 season
- Chairman: Sergey Galitsky
- Manager: Aleksandr Storozhuk (until 4 January); Vladimir Ivić (from 4 January)
- Stadium: Krasnodar Stadium
- Premier League: 6th
- Russian Cup: Runners Up
- Top goalscorer: League: Jhon Córdoba (14); All: Jhon Córdoba (21)
- Highest home attendance: 33,757 vs Zenit St.Petersburg (30 October 2022)
- Lowest home attendance: 7,965 vs Torpedo Moscow (5 March 2023)
- Average home league attendance: 19,155 (27 May 2023)
Home colours	Away colours	Third colours

The 2022–23 FC Krasnodar season was the twelfth successive season that Krasnodar played in the Russian Premier League, the highest tier of association football in Russia. They finished the season in 6th place, and were runners up in the Russian Cup.

== Season events ==
On 14 June, Krasnodar announced the permanent signing of Ifeanyi David Nduka, Olakunle Olusegun and Jonathan Okoronkwo all from Botev Plovdiv, after the three players had spent the previous six-months on loan at Krasnodar.

On 16 June, Krasnodar announced the signing of Danil Karpov from Tyumen to a three-year contract.

On 7 July, Krasnodar announced the signing of free-agent Ilzat Akhmetov to a two-year contract.

On 20 July, Krasnodar announced the singing of Mihajlo Banjac from TSC, to a four-year contract.

On 11 August, Krasnodar announced the singing of Alidzhoni Ayni from Regar-TadAZ, to a five-year contract.

On 7 September, Krasnodar announced the signing of João Batxi] to a three-year contract from Chaves, with Kevin Pina also signing a three-year contract from Chaves the following day.

On 4 January, Aleksandr Storozhuk moved to the Head Coaching role with Krasnodar-2, and Vladimir Ivić was appointed as the Head Coach of Krasnodar on a two-year contract. On the same day, Krasnodar announced the singing of Kady Borges from Qarabağ on a contract until June 2026. The following day, 5 January, Krasnodar announced the signing of Moses Cobnan from Železiarne Podbrezová on a contract until June 2026.

== Squad ==
As of match played 11 June 2023

Number	Name	Nationality	Position	Date of birth (age)	Signed from	Signed in	Contract ends	Apps.	Goals
Goalkeepers
1	Stanislav Agkatsev	(Russia)	GK	9 January 2002 (aged 21)	Academy	2018		16	0
39	Matvei Safonov	(Russia)	GK	25 February 1999 (aged 24)	Academy	2016		146	0
Defenders
4	Júnior Alonso	(Paraguay)	DF	9 February 1993 (aged 30)	Atlético Mineiro	2022	2025	19	1
6	Cristian Ramírez	(Ecuador)	DF	12 August 1994 (aged 28)	Ferencvárosi	2017		187	3
28	Grigory Zhilkin	(Russia)	DF	20 June 2003 (aged 19)	Academy	2021		1	0
31	Kaio	(Brazil)	DF	18 September 1995 (aged 27)	Santa Clara	2019	2024	90	2
32	Dmitri Pivovarov	(Russia)	DF	21 March 2000 (aged 23)	Academy	2021		4	0
33	Georgy Arutyunyan	(Armenia)	DF	9 August 2004 (aged 18)	Academy	2022		3	0
41	Mikhail Sukhoruchenko	(Russia)	DF	13 April 2003 (aged 20)	Academy	2021		2	0
48	Oleg Isayenko	(Russia)	DF	31 January 2000 (aged 23)	Academy	2018		12	0
80	Yegor Sorokin	(Russia)	DF	4 November 1995 (aged 27)	Rubin Kazan	2019	2024	67	0
82	Sergei Volkov	(Russia)	DF	9 September 2002 (aged 20)	Academy	2018		44	2
84	Vyacheslav Litvinov	(Russia)	DF	1 April 2001 (aged 22)	Academy	2018		36	2
98	Sergei Petrov	(Russia)	DF	2 January 1991 (aged 32)	Krylia Sovetov	2013		276	15
Midfielders
7	Ilzat Akhmetov	(Russia)	MF	31 December 1997 (aged 25)	Unattached	2022	2024	40	4
8	Alexander Chernikov	(Russia)	MF	1 February 2000 (aged 23)	Academy	2019		52	3
10	Eduard Spertsyan	(Armenia)	MF	7 June 2000 (aged 23)	Academy	2018		75	22
11	Aleksei Ionov	(Russia)	MF	18 February 1989 (aged 34)	Rostov	2020	2023	85	13
14	Mihajlo Banjac	(Serbia)	MF	10 November 1999 (aged 23)	TSC	2022	2026	40	3
16	Kevin Pina	(Cape Verde)	MF	27 January 1997 (aged 26)	Chaves	2022	2025	24	1
20	Kady Borges	(Brazil)	MF	2 May 1996 (aged 27)	Qarabağ	2023	2026	11	3
26	Dmitri Kratkov	(Russia)	MF	15 January 2002 (aged 21)	Academy	2022		2	0
38	David Kokoyev	(Russia)	MF	29 August 2002 (aged 20)	Academy	2021		2	0
61	Ifeanyi David Nduka	(Nigeria)	MF	2 December 2003 (aged 19)	Botev Plovdiv	2022	2026	1	0
88	Nikita Krivtsov	(Russia)	MF	18 August 2002 (aged 20)	Torpedo Vladimir	2021		49	10
94	Dmitry Kuchugura	(Russia)	MF	21 October 2004 (aged 18)	Academy	2021		1	0
Forwards
9	Jhon Córdoba	(Colombia)	FW	11 May 1993 (aged 29)	Hertha BSC	2021	2025	53	27
17	Kirill Bogdanets	(Russia)	FW	28 March 2004 (aged 19)	Academy	2022		1	0
19	João Batxi	(Angola)	FW	1 May 1998 (aged 25)	Chaves	2022	2025	22	3
21	Danil Karpov	(Russia)	FW	28 June 1999 (aged 23)	Tyumen	2022	2025	2	0
40	Olakunle Olusegun	(Nigeria)	FW	23 April 2002 (aged 21)	Botev Plovdiv	2022	2026	42	3
67	Maksim Kutovoy	(Russia)	FW	1 July 2001 (aged 21)	Academy	2019		11	1
70	Vladislav Samko	(Russia)	FW	3 January 2002 (aged 21)	Academy	2021		10	0
72	Rustam Khalnazarov	(Russia)	FW	20 July 2000 (aged 22)	Academy	2022		1	0
79	Omar Popov	(Russia)	FW	2 January 2003 (aged 20)	Academy	2021		2	0
85	Jonathan Okoronkwo	(Nigeria)	FW	13 September 2003 (aged 18)	Botev Plovdiv	2022	2026	5	0
90	Moses Cobnan	(Nigeria)	FW	10 September 2002 (aged 19)	Železiarne Podbrezová	2023	2026	16	1
96	Alexander Koksharov	(Russia)	FW	20 December 2004 (aged 18)	Academy	2022		8	2
Away on loan
15	Aleks Matsukatov	(Russia)	MF	1 November 1999 (aged 23)	Academy	2019		18	0
18	Yevgeni Chernov	(Russia)	DF	23 October 1992 (aged 30)	Rostov	2020	2024	36	0
23	Vyacheslav Yakimov	(Russia)	MF	5 January 1998 (aged 25)	Academy	2021		17	0
44	Sergei Borodin	(Russia)	DF	30 January 1999 (aged 24)	Academy	2015		16	1
69	Irakli Manelov	(Russia)	FW	19 September 2002 (aged 20)	Academy	2021		25	1
92	Ruslan Apekov	(Russia)	FW	8 June 2000 (aged 23)	Academy	2021		7	0
93	Magomed-Shapi Suleymanov	(Russia)	FW	16 December 1999 (aged 23)	Academy	2015		122	23
	Alidzhoni Ayni	(Tajikistan)	MF	6 August 2004 (aged 18)	Regar-TadAZ	2022	2027	0	0
Contracts suspended
3	Grzegorz Krychowiak	(Poland)	MF	29 January 1990 (aged 33)	Lokomotiv Moscow	2021	2024	15	5
Players who left during the season
10	Wanderson	(Brazil)	MF	7 October 1994 (aged 27)	Red Bull Salzburg	2017		130	16

== Transfers ==
=== In ===
Date	Position	Nationality	Name	From	Fee	Ref.
14 June 2022	MF	(Nigeria)	Ifeanyi David Nduka	Botev Plovdiv	Undisclosed	
14 June 2022	FW	(Nigeria)	Olakunle Olusegun	Botev Plovdiv	Undisclosed	
14 June 2022	FW	(Nigeria)	Jonathan Okoronkwo	Botev Plovdiv	Undisclosed	
16 June 2022	FW	(Russia)	Danil Karpov	Tyumen	Undisclosed	
7 July 2022	MF	(Russia)	Ilzat Akhmetov	Unattached	Free	
20 July 2022	MF	(Serbia)	Mihajlo Banjac	TSC	Undisclosed	
11 August 2022	MF	(Tajikistan)	Alidzhoni Ayni	Regar-TadAZ	Undisclosed	
7 September 2022	FW	(Angola)	João Batxi	Chaves	Undisclosed	
8 September 2022	MF	(Cape Verde)	Kevin Pina	Chaves	Undisclosed	
4 January 2023	MF	(Brazil)	Kady Borges	Qarabağ	Undisclosed	
5 January 2023	FW	(Nigeria)	Moses Cobnan	Železiarne Podbrezová	Undisclosed	

=== Out ===
Date	Position	Nationality	Name	To	Fee	Ref.
1 June 2022	DF	(Russia)	Ilya Martynov	Rotor Volgograd	Undisclosed	
16 June 2022	MF	(Russia)	Daniil Utkin	Rostov	Undisclosed	
22 June 2022	MF	(Russia)	Bogdan Reikhmen	Torpedo Moscow	Undisclosed	
27 June 2022	GK	(Russia)	Sergei Yeshchenko	Kuban Krasnodar	Undisclosed	
30 June 2022	DF	(Russia)	Daniil Kornyushin	Pari NN	Undisclosed	
4 July 2022	FW	(Russia)	Leon Sabua	Urartu	Undisclosed	
6 July 2022	FW	(Russia)	Igor Andreyev	Rodina Moscow	Undisclosed	
11 July 2022	FW	(Denmark)	Younes Namli	Sparta Rotterdam	Undisclosed	
12 July 2022	MF	(Netherlands)	Tonny Vilhena	Espanyol	Undisclosed	
21 December 2022	FW	(Brazil)	Wanderson	Internacional	Undisclosed	
8 June 2023	DF	(Russia)	Ruslan Apekov	Akron Tolyatti	Undisclosed	
14 June 2023	DF	(Russia)	Vyacheslav Litvinov	Sochi	Undisclosed	
15 June 2023	MF	(Russia)	Vyacheslav Yakimov	Fakel Voronezh	Undisclosed	
20 June 2023	DF	(Russia)	Yevgeni Chernov	Rostov	Undisclosed	
20 June 2023	FW	(Russia)	Irakly Manelov	Torpedo Moscow	Undisclosed	
23 June 2023	DF	(Russia)	Oleg Isayenko	Khimki	Undisclosed	
29 June 2023	DF	(Russia)	Sergei Borodin	Torpedo Moscow	Undisclosed	
30 June 2023	MF	(Russia)	Aleks Matsukatov	Arsenal Tula	Undisclosed	

=== Loans out ===
Date from	Position	Nationality	Name	To	Date to	Ref.
8 July 2022	MF	(Poland)	Grzegorz Krychowiak	Al Shabab	End of season	
10 July 2022	DF	(Russia)	Yevgeni Chernov	Rostov	End of season	
7 August 2022	GK	(Russia)	Nikita Kokarev	Rotor Volgograd	End of season	
17 August 2022	FW	(Russia)	Magomed-Shapi Suleymanov	Hapoel Be'er Sheva	End of season	
5 December 2022	DF	(Russia)	Vyacheslav Yakimov	Fakel Voronezh	End of season	
11 January 2023	DF	(Russia)	Sergei Borodin	Beitar Jerusalem	End of season	
16 January 2023	FW	(Russia)	Ruslan Apekov	Akron Tolyatti	End of season	
24 January 2023	FW	(Russia)	Irakly Manelov	Arsenal Tula	End of season	
18 February 2023	MF	(Tajikistan)	Alidzhoni Ayni	Istiklol	31 December 2023	
22 February 2023	MF	(Russia)	Aleks Matsukatov	Akron Tolyatti	End of season	

=== Released ===
Date	Position	Nationality	Name	Joined	Date	Ref.
21 June 2022	FW	(Russia)	Vladimir Ilyin	Akhmat Grozny	23 June 2022	
31 December 2022	MF	(Russia)	Vladislav Yanchenko			
11 June 2023	MF	(Russia)	Aleksei Ionov	Rostov	20 June 2023	
30 June 2023	GK	(Russia)	Valentin Grishin			
30 June 2023	DF	(Russia)	Ivan Dmitriyev			
30 June 2023	DF	(Russia)	Bogdan Logachyov	Astrakhan		
30 June 2023	DF	(Russia)	Sergey Novikov			
30 June 2023	MF	(Russia)	Grzegorz Krychowiak	Abha		
30 June 2023	MF	(Russia)	Rustam Berzegov	Rodina-2 Moscow		
30 June 2023	MF	(Russia)	Dmitri Kratkov			
30 June 2023	FW	(Russia)	Danil Polyakh	Biolog-Novokubansk		

== Friendlies ==
24 January 2023	Krasnodar	1 – 0	Bunyodkor	Dubai, United Arab Emirates
15:30 MSK (UTC+3)	Spertsyan 14' (pen.); Ramírez (yellow card) 36'; Karpov (yellow card) 75'; Puzanov (yellow card) 79'	Report	Ergashev (yellow card) 76'; Yokubov (yellow card) 81'	Stadium: The Sevens Stadium

3 February 2023	Krasnodar	1 – 0	Sochi	Abu Dhabi, United Arab Emirates
19:30 MSK (UTC+3)	Kaio 23'; Pina (yellow card) 84'	Report	Meshchaninov (red card) 81'	Stadium: Al Nahyan Stadium

6 February 2023	Krasnodar	0 – 4	Spartak Moscow	Abu Dhabi, United Arab Emirates
20:00 MSK (UTC+3)	Cobnan (yellow card) 51'	Report	Melyoshin 22'; Klassen (yellow card) 54'; Zinkovsky 58'; Chernov (yellow card) 68'; Zobnin (yellow card) 76'; Nicholson 81'; Baldé 83' (pen.) (yellow card) 88'	Stadium: Al Nahyan Stadium

11 February 2023	Rostov	0 – 4	Krasnodar	Abu Dhabi, United Arab Emirates
20:00 MSK (UTC+3)		Report	Pina 9'; Cobnan 43'; Córdoba 59', 78'	Stadium: Al Nahyan Stadium; Referee: Sergei Karasev

== Competitions ==
=== Overview ===
Competition	First match	Last match	Starting round	Final position	Record							
Competition	First match	Last match	Starting round	Final position	Pld	W	D	L	GF	GA	GD	Win %
Premier League	16 July 2022	3 June 2023	Matchday 1	6th	30	13	9	8	62	46	+16	43.33
Russian Cup	31 August 2022	11 June 2023	Round of 32	Runners Up	14	7	5	2	21	12	+9	50.00
Total					44	20	14	10	83	58	+25	45.45

Last updated: 11 June 2023
Source: See Results

=== Premier League ===
==== League table ====
Pos	Team	Pld	W	D	L	GF	GA	GD	Pts
4	Rostov	30	15	8	7	48	44	+4	53
5	Akhmat Grozny	30	15	5	10	51	39	+12	50
6	Krasnodar	30	13	9	8	62	46	+16	48
7	Orenburg	30	14	4	12	58	55	+3	46
8	Lokomotiv Moscow	30	13	6	11	54	46	+8	45 (Note: Lokomotiv and Dynamo tied on head-to-head criteria. Overall goal difference: Lokomotiv +8, Dynamo +4.)

Source: Premier Liga
Rules for classification: 1) Points; 2) Head-to-head points; 3) Head-to-head matches won; 4) Head-to-head goal difference; 5) Head-to-head goals scored; 6) Matches won; 7) Goal difference; 8) Goals scored; 9) 2021–22 position (not applicable to final standings); 10) Play-off.

==== Results summary ====
Overall								Home						Away					
Pld	W	D	L	GF	GA	GD	Pts	W	D	L	GF	GA	GD	W	D	L	GF	GA	GD
30	13	9	8	62	46	+16	48	8	4	3	29	18	+11	5	5	5	33	28	+5

Last updated: 3 June 2023.
Source: See Results

==== Results by round ====
Round	1	2	3	4	5	6	7	8	9	10	11	12	13	14	15	16	17	18	19	20	21	22	23	24	25	26	27	28	29	30
Ground	H	H	A	H	A	H	A	H	A	H	A	A	H	A	H	A	A	H	H	A	A	H	A	A	H	H	A	H	H	A
Result	D	L	W	W	D	W	W	W	L	W	D	L	L	W	L	D	L	D	W	L	W	W	W	L	D	W	D	W	D	D
Position	4	13	9	8	7	6	4	3	4	4	5	5	5	5	6	7	8	8	7	8	8	7	6	7	6	6	6	6	6	6

Updated to match(es) played on 3 June 2023. Source: See Results
A = Away; H = Home; W = Win; D = Draw; L = Loss

==== Results ====
17 July 2022 1	Krasnodar	2 – 2	Fakel Voronezh	Krasnodar
20:00 MSK (UTC+3)	Ionov 24' (yellow card) 89'; Spertsyan 40'; Córdoba (penalty missed) 45'+	Report	Dashayev 10'; Cherov (yellow card) 45'; Akbashev 49'; Bozhin (yellow card) 81'	Stadium: Krasnodar Stadium; Attendance: 16,125; Referee: Sergei Karasev

23 July 2022 2	Krasnodar	1 – 4	Spartak Moscow	Krasnodar
20:00 MSK (UTC+3)	Borodin (yellow card) 24'; Chernikov (red card) 37'; Spertsyan 60' (pen.)	Report	Sobolev (yellow card) 20'; Martins (yellow card) 26'; Zobnin 35', 53'; Promes 46'; Litvinov (yellow card) 49'; Moses 83'; Selikhov (yellow card) 87'	Stadium: Krasnodar Stadium; Attendance: 28,738; Referee: Kirill Levnikov

29 July 2022 3	Ural Yekaterinburg	1 – 3	Krasnodar	Yekaterinburg
18:00 MSK (UTC+3)	Konovalov (yellow card) 33'; Gerasimov (yellow card) 58'; Miškić (yellow card) 67'; Kashtanov 90'	Report	Borodin 28'; Yakimov (yellow card) 52'; Spertsyan 59' (pen.), 74' (pen.)	Stadium: Central Stadium; Attendance: 2,997; Referee: Vladimir Moskalyov

6 August 2022 4	Krasnodar	3 – 0	Lokomotiv Moscow	Krasnodar
20:00 MSK (UTC+3)	Ionov (yellow card) 9'; Spertsyan (yellow card) 20'; Volkov (yellow card) 45+'; Ramírez (yellow card) 65' (goal) 78'; Olusegun 85', 90+'; Manelov (yellow card) 85'	Report	Miranchuk (yellow card) 15'; Mampassi (yellow card) 66'	Stadium: Krasnodar Stadium; Attendance: 25,226; Referee: Vladislav Bezborodov

13 August 2022 5	Dynamo Moscow	0 – 0	Krasnodar	Moscow
20:00 MSK (UTC+3)	Gagnidze (yellow card) 37'; Parshivlyuk (yellow card) 45+'; Fomin (yellow card) 83'	Report	Spertsyan (yellow card) 12'; Ionov (yellow card) 77'; Safonov (yellow card) 83'	Stadium: VTB Arena; Attendance: 19,430; Referee: Sergei Karasev

21 August 2022 6	Krasnodar	2 – 0	Orenburg	Krasnodar
20:00 MSK (UTC+3)	Ionov 28'; Krivtsov (yellow card) 61'; Córdoba 66'; Banjac (yellow card) 68'	Report	Gojković (yellow card) 10'; Mansilla (yellow card) 40' (yellow-red card) 56'; Ayupov (yellow card) 55'	Stadium: Krasnodar Stadium; Attendance: 21,348; Referee: Aleksey Amelin

28 August 2022 7	Torpedo Moscow	1 – 4	Krasnodar	Khimki
17:30 MSK (UTC+3)	Pomerko (yellow card) 42'; Krivtsov 59' (o.g.)	Report	Spertsyan 31', 44'; Córdoba 54'; Borodin (yellow card) 65'; Kaio (yellow card) 75'; Akhmetov 90'	Stadium: Arena Khimki; Attendance: 2,500; Referee: Evgeniy Kukulyak

3 September 2022 8	Krasnodar	2 – 1	Sochi	Krasnodar
18:30 MSK (UTC+3)	Olusegun 49'; Spertsyan 52'; Banjac (yellow card) 79'; Krivtsov (yellow card) 81'; Córdoba (yellow card) 90+'	Report	Melkadze 65'; Makarchuk (yellow card) 72'; Yurganov (yellow card) 76'; Terekhov (yellow card) 90+'	Stadium: Krasnodar Stadium; Attendance: 27,097; Referee: Pavel Shadykhanov

10 September 2022 9	CSKA Moscow	4 – 1	Krasnodar	Moscow
17:30 MSK (UTC+3)	Carrascal 30' (pen.); Zdjelar (yellow card) 37'; Chalov 45+' (pen.); Medina 62' (pen.); Gaich (yellow card) 89' (goal) 90+'; Oblyakov (yellow card) 90'	Report	Safonov (yellow card) 29'; Krivtsov (yellow card) 35'; Ramírez 47'; Yakimov (yellow card) 67'; Batxi (yellow card) 84'; Akhmetov (yellow card) 88'	Stadium: VEB Arena; Attendance: 14,880; Referee: Sergey Ivanov

18 September 2022 10	Krasnodar	3 – 1	Khimki	Krasnodar
16:30 MSK (UTC+3)	Olusegun (yellow card) 1'; Spertsyan 7'; Krivtsov 33'; Manelov (yellow card) 68'; Kutovoy 90+'	Report	Lomovitsky (yellow card) 25'; Tikhy (yellow card) 51'; Kukharchuk 57'; Sadygov (yellow card) 90+'	Stadium: Krasnodar Stadium; Attendance: 22,259; Referee: Vladislav Bezborodov

3 October 2022 11	Krylia Sovetov	0 – 0	Krasnodar	Samara
19:00 MSK (UTC+3)	Bijl (yellow card) 39'; Glushenkov (yellow card) 72'	Report	Kaio (yellow card) 39'	Stadium: Solidarnost Samara Arena; Attendance: 3,685; Referee: Alexey Sukhoi

9 October 2022 12	Rostov	3 – 2	Krasnodar	Rostov-on-Don
19:00 MSK (UTC+3)	Pesyakov (yellow card) 48'; Silyanov 51'; Poloz 59' (pen.) (yellow card) 80'; Mironov 75'; Golenkov (yellow card) 90'	Report	Olusegun 1'; Pina (yellow card) 11'; Kaio (yellow card) 11' (yellow-red card) 57'; Córdoba 32' (yellow card) 90'	Stadium: Rostov Arena; Attendance: 8,325; Referee: Vitali Meshkov

15 October 2022 13	Krasnodar	2 – 3	Akhmat Grozny	Krasnodar
16:30 MSK (UTC+3)	Spertsyan 30'; Banjac (yellow card) 38' (goal) 55'; Krivtsov (yellow card) 90+'	Report	Berisha 18' (pen.); Timofeyev 35' (yellow card) 54'; Karapuzov (yellow card) 45+'; Sadulayev (yellow card) 65'; Kamilov (yellow card) 75'; Oleynikov (yellow card) 90+' (goal) 90+'	Stadium: Krasnodar Stadium; Attendance: 20,139; Referee: Yan Bobrovsky

22 October 2022 14	Pari NN	0 – 2	Krasnodar	Nizhny Novgorod
14:00 MSK (UTC+3)	Yuldoshev (yellow card) 14'; Maiga (yellow card) 43' (yellow-red card) 48'; Kakkoyev (yellow card) 82' (red card) 90+'	Report	Akhmetov 17'; Volkov (yellow card) 46'; Sorokin (yellow card) 79'; Córdoba (yellow card) 88' (goal) 90+'; Spertsyan (yellow card) 90+'	Stadium: Nizhny Novgorod Stadium; Attendance: 4,368; Referee: Vasily Kazartsev

30 October 2022 15	Krasnodar	0 – 1	Zenit St.Petersburg	Krasnodar
19:30 MSK (UTC+3)	Spertsyan (yellow card) 39'; Volkov (yellow card) 47'; Petrov (yellow card) 69'; Ramírez (yellow card) 82'	Report	Alip (yellow card) 43'; Kuzyayev (yellow card) 79' (goal) 87' (pen.)	Stadium: Krasnodar Stadium; Attendance: 33,757; Referee: Vladimir Moskalyov

5 November 2022 16	Fakel Voronezh	3 – 3	Krasnodar	Voronezh
16:30 MSK (UTC+3)	Akbashev 11'; Dmitriyev (yellow card) 33'; Kvekveskiri (yellow card) 40' (goal) 73', 84'	Report	Córdoba 28' (yellow card) 49'; Banjac 42' (pen.) (yellow card) 48'; Ionov 62'; Ramírez (penalty missed) 67'	Stadium: Tsentralnyi Profsoyuz Stadion; Attendance: 13,578; Referee: Sergei Karasev

13 November 2022 17	Orenburg	5 – 1	Krasnodar	Orenburg
14:00 MSK (UTC+3)	Sychevoy 2', 29', 58'; Vera 23'; Marín 51'; Ayupov (yellow card) 72'	Report	Kaio (yellow card) 9'; Volkov (yellow card) 15'; Ionov 43'; Manelov (yellow card) 45'; Akhmetov (yellow card) 47'; Spertsyan (yellow card) 57'; Petrov (yellow card) 71'; Sorokin (yellow card) 77'	Stadium: Gazovik Stadium; Attendance: 4,852; Referee: Kirill Levnikov

5 March 2023 18	Krasnodar	2 – 2	Torpedo Moscow	Krasnodar
16:30 MSK (UTC+3)	Cobnan (yellow card) 12'; Córdoba (yellow card) 40' (goal) 70'; Kady (yellow card) 45+'; Petrov 62'	Report	Stefanovich 9'; Roganović (yellow card) 13'; Kutepov (yellow card) 18'; Lebedenko 78'; Proshkin (yellow card) 90+'	Stadium: Krasnodar Stadium; Attendance: 7,965; Referee: Evgeniy Kukulyak

11 March 2023 19	Krasnodar	3 – 1	Dynamo Moscow	Krasnodar
19:00 MSK (UTC+3)	Kady 24', 67'; Spertsyan (yellow card) 85'; Krivtsov 90+'	Report	Skopintsev (yellow card) 14'; Tyukavin 19'; Sazonov (yellow card) 36'; Fomin (yellow card) 50'; Ngamaleu (red card) 58'; Normann (yellow card) 65'	Stadium: Krasnodar Stadium; Attendance: 13,256; Referee: Artyom Lyubimov

18 March 2023 20	Lokomotiv Moscow	3 – 2	Krasnodar	Moscow
19:30 MSK (UTC+3)	Smolnikov (yellow card) 21' (yellow-red card) 72'; Karpukas (yellow card) 43'; Tiknizyan (yellow card) 45+'; Dzyuba (penalty missed) 45'+ 66'; Barinov 47'; Glushenkov 51'; Zhemaletdinov (yellow card) 61'; Shchetinin (yellow card) 86'	Report	Cobnan (yellow card) 16'; Alonso 29'; Córdoba 39' (yellow card) 66'; Ramírez (yellow card) 56' (yellow-red card) 63'	Stadium: RZD Arena; Attendance: 3,335; Referee: Kirill Levnikov

2 April 2023 21	Khimki	0 – 6	Krasnodar	Khimki
14:00 MSK (UTC+3)	Lystsov (red card) 27'; Tassano (yellow card) 42'; Karginov (yellow card) 81'	Report	Batxi 23'; Córdoba 47', 56'; Kady 63'; Ionov 78'; Krivtsov 86'	Stadium: Arena Khimki; Attendance: 1,129; Referee: Pavel Shadykhanov

9 April 2023 22	Krasnodar	3 – 1	Pari NN	Krasnodar
19:00 MSK (UTC+3)	Krivtsov 4', 14' (yellow card) 88'; Córdoba 62'; Olusegun (yellow card) 79'	Report	Masoero (yellow card) 48'; Krotov (yellow card) 54'; Suleymanov 71' (pen.) (yellow card) 87'	Stadium: Krasnodar Stadium; Attendance: 10,677; Referee: Sergey Cheban

15 April 2023 23	Sochi	0 – 2	Krasnodar	Sochi
16:30 MSK (UTC+3)	Margasov (yellow card) 86'	Report	Batxi 40'; Krivtsov 48'; Chernikov (yellow card) 56'; Kaio (yellow card) 74'	Stadium: Fisht Olympic Stadium; Attendance: 3,129; Referee: Vitali Meshkov

24 April 2023 24	Spartak Moscow	4 – 3	Krasnodar	Moscow
19:00 MSK (UTC+3)	Dzhikiya (yellow card) 31'; Sobolev 63' (pen.), 68'; Zinkovsky 81'; Promes 85'; Selikhov (yellow card) 88'	Report	Córdoba 11'; Pina (yellow card) 43'; Litvinov (yellow card) 45+'; Batxi (yellow card) 54' (goal) 58'; Ramírez (yellow card) 63'; Spertsyan 72'	Stadium: Lukoil Arena; Attendance: 6,083; Referee: Vladislav Bezborodov

29 April 2023 25	Krasnodar	1 – 1	Ural Yekaterinburg	Krasnodar
19:00 MSK (UTC+3)	Pina 13'; Volkov (yellow card) 90+'} Cobnan (yellow card) 90+'	Report	Yushin 39'; Sungatulin (yellow card) 67'; Zheleznov (yellow card) 90+'	Stadium: Krasnodar Stadium; Attendance: 10,051; Referee: Sergei Karasev

7 May 2023 26	Krasnodar	2 – 1	Krylia Sovetov	Krasnodar
19:00 MSK (UTC+3)	Ramírez (yellow card) 23'; Pina (yellow card) 23'; Volkov 35'; Córdoba 89'	Report	Pinyayev (yellow card) 12' (yellow-red card) 31'; Garré 16'; Zuyev (yellow card) 57'	Stadium: Krasnodar Stadium; Attendance: 9,874; Referee: Alexey Amelin

13 May 2023 27	Zenit St.Petersburg	2 – 2	Krasnodar	Saint Petersburg
16:30 MSK (UTC+3)	Malcom 15'; Claudinho (yellow card) 78'; Kuzyayev (yellow card) 84'; Cassierra 90+'; Krugovoy (yellow card) 90+'	Report	Cobnan (yellow card) 29'; Banjac 51'; Ionov 58'	Stadium: Krestovsky Stadium; Attendance: 25,508; Referee: Roman Safyan

21 May 2023 28	Krasnodar	3 – 0	Rostov	Krasnodar
19:00 MSK (UTC+3)	Ionov 3'; Córdoba 10'; Koksharov 33'	Report	Melyokhin (yellow card) 41'	Stadium: Krasnodar Stadium; Attendance: 17,069; Referee: Artyom Lyubimov

27 May 2023 29	Krasnodar	0 – 0	CSKA Moscow	Krasnodar
19:00 MSK (UTC+3)	Pina (yellow card) 13'; Litvinov (red card) 57'	Report	Medina (yellow card) 83'	Stadium: Krasnodar Stadium; Attendance: 23,750; Referee: Kirill Levnikov

3 June 2023 30	Akhmat Grozny	2 – 2	Krasnodar	Grozny
17 MSK (UTC+3)	Kharin (yellow card) 35'; Kamilov 70' (yellow card) 83'; Oleynikov 78'; Karapuzov (yellow card) 82'; Sheliya (yellow card) 89'; Alsultanov (yellow card) 90+'	Report	Ionov (yellow card) 26'; Arutyunyan (yellow card) 39'; Córdoba 66' (yellow card) 83'; Olusegun 90+'	Stadium: Akhmat-Arena; Attendance: 5,987; Referee: Rafael Shafeev

=== Russian Cup ===
==== Group stage ====
Pos	Team	Pld	W	PW	PL	L	GF	GA	GD	Pts	Qualification
1	Krasnodar	6	4	0	1	1	11	4	+7	13	Qualification to the Knockout phase (RPL path)
2	Lokomotiv Moscow	6	3	1	0	2	11	6	+5	11	Qualification to the Knockout phase (RPL path)
3	Pari Nizhny Novgorod	6	2	2	0	2	6	7	−1	10	Qualification to the Knockout phase (regions path)
4	Khimki	6	0	0	2	4	3	14	−11	2	

Source: Russian Football Union (in Russian), Soccerway
Rules for classification: 1) Points; 2) Head-to-head points; 3) Head-to-head matches won; 4) Head-to-head goal difference; 5) Head-to-head goals scored; 6) Matches won; 7) Goal difference; 8) Goals scored; 9) Penalty shoot-out goal difference; 10) Draw.

31 August 2022 1	Khimki	0 – 2	Krasnodar	Khimki
16:30 MSK (UTC+3)	Volkov (red card) 26'; Gbane (yellow card) 62'	Report	Litvinov 27'; Akhmetov 41'; Sorokin (yellow card) 65'	Stadium: Arena Khimki; Attendance: 837; Referee: Anton Frolov

14 September 2022 2	Lokomotiv Moscow	2 – 2 (3 – 1 p)	Krasnodar	Moscow
15:00 MSK (UTC+3)	Kamano 6'; Isidor (yellow card) 16'; Kerk 58'	Report	Litvinov 12'; Córdoba 20'; Sorokin (yellow card) 45+1'; Safonov (yellow card) 45+2'	Stadium: RZD Arena; Attendance: 4,512; Referee: Artyom Lyubimov
	Penalties
	Isidor (penalty scored); Pedrinho (penalty scored); Ignatyev (penalty scored)		(penalty scored) Ramírez; (penalty missed) Sorokin; (penalty missed) Krivtsov; (penalty missed) Akhmetov

28 September 2022 3	Krasnodar	2 – 0	Pari NN	Krasnodar
20:00 MSK (UTC+3)	Córdoba 85'; Olusegun 87'	Report	Stotsky (yellow card) 7'; Gotsuk (yellow card) 73'	Stadium: Krasnodar Stadium; Attendance: 15,096; Referee: Roman Safyan

19 October 2022 4	Pari NN	1 – 0	Krasnodar	Nizhny Novgorod
18:00 MSK (UTC+3)	Milson (yellow card) 5'; Shiltsov 49'; Kakkoyev (yellow card) 52'; Nigmatullin (yellow card) 65'; Zhigulyov (yellow card) 81'	Report	Spertsyan (yellow card) 73'	Stadium: Nizhny Novgorod Stadium; Attendance: 6,150; Referee: Vladimir Moskalyov

23 November 2022 5	Krasnodar	1 – 0	Lokomotiv Moscow	Krasnodar
20:00 MSK (UTC+3)	Akhmetov 1'	Report	Barinov (yellow card) 45+1'; Magkeyev (yellow card) 55'	Stadium: Krasnodar Stadium; Attendance: 23,237; Referee: Sergey Karasyov

27 November 2022 6	Krasnodar	4 – 1	Khimki	Krasnodar
19:00 MSK (UTC+3)	Spertsyan 13'; Córdoba 32', 56'; Koksharov 89'	Report	Magomedov 30'; Nikitin (yellow card) 86'	Stadium: Krasnodar Stadium; Attendance: 20,278; Referee: Rafael Shafeyev

==== Knockout stage ====
23 February 2023 RPL path Quarter-finals 1st leg	CSKA Moscow	3 – 0	Krasnodar	Moscow
17:30 MSK (UTC+3)	Moisés 12'; Chalov 30'; Carrascal (penalty missed) 64'; Zabolotny 86'	Report	Kady (yellow card) 45+3'	Stadium: VEB Arena; Attendance: 6,546; Referee: Pavel Kukuyan

28 February 2023 RPL path Quarter-finals 2nd leg	Krasnodar	1 – 0 (1 – 3 agg.)	CSKA Moscow	Krasnodar
19:30 MSK (UTC+3)	Alonso (yellow card) 23'; Spertsyan 50'; Volkov (yellow card) 81'; Krivtsov (yellow card) 90+2'	Report		Stadium: Krasnodar Stadium; Attendance: 26,314; Referee: Sergei Karasev

15 March 2023 Regions path Quarter-finals Stage 2	Akhmat Grozny	0 – 3	Krasnodar	Grozny
15:00 MSK (UTC+3)	Shvets (yellow card) 36'; Timofeyev (red card) 39'	Report	Cobnan 27'; Krivtsov 60', 90+3'; Chernikov (yellow card) 86'	Stadium: Akhmat Arena; Attendance: 6,700; Referee: Sergey Ivanov

6 April 2023 Regions path Semi-finals Stage 1	Krasnodar	1 – 1 (5 – 3 p)	Rostov	Krasnodar
20:00 MSK (UTC+3)	Spertsyan 24' (yellow card) 69'; Banjac (yellow card) 61'; Kady (yellow card) 73'; Ramírez (yellow card) 78'; Alonso (yellow card) 88'	Report	Selyava (yellow card) 40'; Tugarev 54'; Terentyev (yellow card) 56'; Melyokhin (yellow card) 69'	Stadium: Krasnodar Stadium; Attendance: 25,895; Referee: Vladislav Bezborodov
	Penalties
	Spertsyan (penalty scored); Ionov (penalty scored); Córdoba (penalty scored); Alonso (penalty scored); Krivtsov (penalty scored)		(penalty scored) Bayramyan; (penalty scored) Komlichenko; (penalty missed) Prokhin; (penalty scored) Tugarev

19 April 2023 Regions path Semi-finals Stage 2	Krasnodar	2 – 2 (5 – 3 p)	Krylia Sovetov Samara	Krasnodar
19:00 MSK (UTC+3)	Sperstyan 32'; Córdoba 70'	Report	Rahmanović (yellow card) 45' (yellow-red card) 47'; Bijl (yellow card) 90'; Tsypchenko 90+3'; Gaponov 90+5'	Stadium: Krasnodar Stadium; Attendance: 18,478; Referee: Pavel Shadykhanov
	Penalties
	Sperstyan (penalty scored); Banjac (penalty scored); Akhmetov (penalty scored)		Bijl (penalty missed); Pisarsky (penalty missed); Gorshkov (penalty missed)

3 May 2023 Regions path Final Stage 1	Krasnodar	0 – 0 (4 – 2 p)	Akron Tolyatti	Krasnodar
19:30 MSK (UTC+3)	Alonso (yellow card) 65'; Córdoba (yellow card) 80'	Report		Stadium: Krasnodar Stadium; Attendance: 27,125; Referee: Artyom Chistyakov
	Penalties
	Spertsyan (penalty scored); Córdoba (penalty scored); Akhmetov (penalty scored); Batxi (penalty scored)		(penalty scored) Savichev; (penalty missed) Pesegov; (penalty scored) Eldurashev; (penalty missed) Azarov

17 May 2023 Regions path Final Stage 2	Krasnodar	2 – 1	Ural Yekaterinburg	Krasnodar
19:30 MSK (UTC+3)	Pantaleão 9'; Córdoba 59'; Banjac (yellow card) 61'	Report	Bicfalvi 22'; Goglichidze (yellow card) 57' (yellow-red card) 90+1'; Yegorychev (yellow card) 68'	Stadium: Krasnodar Stadium; Attendance: 25,828; Referee: Sergei Karasev

==== Final ====
11 June 2023	Krasnodar	1 – 1 (5 – 6 p)	CSKA Moscow	Moscow
17:00 MSK (UTC+3)	Córdoba 50'; Batxi (yellow card) 58'; Petrov (yellow card) 62'; Cobnan (yellow card) 79'	Report	Chalov 32' (pen.); Zdjelar (yellow card) 48'; Oblyakov (yellow card) 58'; Willyan (yellow card) 76'; Carrascal (yellow card) 86'; Diveyev (yellow card) 90'	Stadium: Luzhniki Stadium; Attendance: 53,425; Referee: Vladislav Bezborodov
	Penalties
	Spertsyan (penalty scored); Akhmetov (penalty scored); Córdoba (penalty scored); Batxi (penalty missed); Alonso (penalty scored); Ramírez (penalty scored); Olusegun (penalty missed)		(penalty scored) Chalov; (penalty scored) Diveyev; (penalty missed) Moisés; (penalty scored) Gajić; (penalty scored) Medina; (penalty scored) Carrascal; (penalty scored) Zabolotny

== Squad statistics ==
As of match played 11 June 2023

=== Appearances and goals ===
No.	Pos	Nat	Player	Total		Premier League		Russian Cup	
No.	Pos	Nat	Player	Apps	Goals	Apps	Goals	Apps	Goals
1	GK	(Russia) RUS	Stanislav Agkatsev	8	0	3	0	5	0
4	DF	(Paraguay) PAR	Júnior Alonso	19	1	12	1	7	0
6	DF	(Ecuador) ECU	Cristian Ramírez	39	2	26+1	2	10+2	0
7	MF	(Russia) RUS	Ilzat Akhmetov	40	4	10+17	2	8+5	2
8	MF	(Russia) RUS	Aleksandr Chernikov	19	0	11+2	0	2+4	0
9	FW	(Colombia) COL	Jhon Córdoba	37	21	22+1	14	12+2	7
10	MF	(Armenia) ARM	Eduard Spertsyan	41	14	26+2	10	12+1	4
11	MF	(Russia) RUS	Aleksei Ionov	38	7	20+7	7	8+3	0
14	MF	(Serbia) SRB	Mihajlo Banjac	40	3	16+11	3	10+3	0
16	MF	(Cape Verde) CPV	Kevin Pina	24	1	14+1	1	7+2	0
17	FW	(Russia) RUS	Kirill Bogdanets	1	0	0	0	0+1	0
19	FW	(Angola) ANG	João Batxi	22	3	9+5	3	7+1	0
20	MF	(Brazil) BRA	Kady Borges	11	3	6+1	3	3+1	0
21	FW	(Russia) RUS	Danil Karpov	2	0	0	0	0+2	0
26	MF	(Russia) RUS	Dmitri Kratkov	2	0	0+2	0	0	0
31	DF	(Brazil) BRA	Kaio Pantaleão	28	1	20	0	6+2	1
32	DF	(Russia) RUS	Dmitri Pivovarov	2	0	0+1	0	0+1	0
33	DF	(Armenia) ARM	Georgy Arutyunyan	3	0	2	0	1	0
38	MF	(Russia) RUS	David Kokoyev	1	0	0+1	0	0	0
39	GK	(Russia) RUS	Matvei Safonov	36	0	27	0	9	0
40	FW	(Nigeria) NGR	Olakunle Olusegun	33	3	19+5	2	3+6	1
41	DF	(Russia) RUS	Mikhail Sukhoruchenko	1	0	0+1	0	0	0
48	DF	(Russia) RUS	Oleg Isayenko	4	0	1+2	0	1	0
61	MF	(Nigeria) NGR	Ifeanyi David Nduka	1	0	0+1	0	0	0
67	FW	(Russia) RUS	Maksim Kutovoy	1	1	0+1	1	0	0
70	FW	(Russia) RUS	Vladislav Samko	4	0	0+3	0	1	0
72	FW	(Russia) RUS	Rustam Khalnazarov	1	0	0+1	0	0	0
80	DF	(Russia) RUS	Yegor Sorokin	11	0	6+1	0	4	0
82	DF	(Russia) RUS	Sergei Volkov	40	1	24+3	1	9+4	0
84	DF	(Russia) RUS	Vyacheslav Litvinov	26	2	10+8	0	8	2
85	FW	(Nigeria) NGR	Jonathan Okoronkwo	3	0	0+1	0	1+1	0
88	MF	(Russia) RUS	Nikita Krivtsov	27	8	15+5	6	4+3	2
90	FW	(Nigeria) NGR	Moses Cobnan	16	1	6+4	0	3+3	1
96	FW	(Russia) RUS	Alexander Koksharov	8	2	1+6	1	0+1	1
98	DF	(Russia) RUS	Sergei Petrov	29	1	9+10	1	9+1	0
Players who suspended their contracts:
Players away from the club on loan:
15	MF	(Russia) RUS	Aleks Matsukatov	4	0	0+1	0	0+3	0
23	MF	(Russia) RUS	Vyacheslav Yakimov	7	0	1+4	0	1+1	0
44	DF	(Russia) RUS	Sergei Borodin	12	1	10	1	2	0
69	FW	(Russia) RUS	Irakli Manelov	11	0	3+6	0	1+1	0
92	FW	(Russia) RUS	Ruslan Apekov	2	0	0+2	0	0	0
93	FW	(Russia) RUS	Magomed-Shapi Suleymanov	4	0	1+3	0	0	0
Players who left Krasnodar during the season:

=== Goal scorers ===
Place	Position	Nation	Number	Name	Premier League	Russian Cup	Total
1	FW	(Colombia)	9	Jhon Córdoba	14	7	21
2	MF	(Armenia)	10	Eduard Spertsyan	10	4	14
3	MF	(Russia)	88	Nikita Krivtsov	6	2	8
4	MF	(Russia)	11	Aleksei Ionov	7	0	7
5	FW	(Nigeria)	40	Olakunle Olusegun	5	1	6
6	MF	(Russia)	7	Ilzat Akhmetov	2	2	4
7	MF	(Serbia)	14	Mihajlo Banjac	3	0	3
7	FW	(Angola)	19	João Batxi	3	0	3
7	MF	(Brazil)	20	Kady Borges	3	0	3
10	DF	(Ecuador)	6	Cristian Ramírez	2	0	2
10	FW	(Russia)	96	Alexander Koksharov	1	1	2
10	DF	(Russia)	84	Vyacheslav Litvinov	0	2	2
13	DF	(Paraguay)	4	Júnior Alonso	1	0	1
13	DF	(Russia)	82	Sergei Volkov	1	0	1
13	DF	(Russia)	98	Sergei Petrov	1	0	1
13	DF	(Russia)	44	Sergei Borodin	1	0	1
13	MF	(Cape Verde)	6	Kevin Pina	1	0	1
13	FW	(Russia)	67	Maksim Kutovoy	1	0	1
13	FW	(Nigeria)	90	Moses Cobnan	0	1	1
13	DF	(Brazil)	31	Kaio Pantaleão	0	1	1
				TOTALS	62	21	83

=== Clean sheets ===
Place	Position	Nation	Number	Name	Premier League	Russian Cup	Total
1	GK	(Russia)	39	Matvei Safonov	7	4	11
2	GK	(Russia)	1	Stanislav Agkatsev	2	2	4
				TOTALS	9	6	15

=== Disciplinary record ===
Number	Nation	Position	Name	Premier League		Russian Cup		Total	
Number	Nation	Position	Name	Booked	Sent off (straight red)	Booked	Sent off (straight red)	Booked	Sent off (straight red)
4	(Paraguay)	DF	Júnior Alonso	0	0	3	0	3	0
6	(Ecuador)	DF	Cristian Ramírez	6	1	1	0	7	1
7	(Russia)	MF	Ilzat Akhmetov	2	0	0	0	2	0
8	(Russia)	MF	Aleksandr Chernikov	1	1	1	0	2	1
9	(Colombia)	FW	Jhon Córdoba	7	0	1	0	8	0
10	(Armenia)	MF	Eduard Spertsyan	6	0	2	0	8	0
11	(Russia)	MF	Aleksei Ionov	4	0	0	0	4	0
14	(Serbia)	MF	Mihajlo Banjac	4	0	2	0	6	0
16	(Cape Verde)	MF	Kevin Pina	4	0	0	0	4	0
19	(Angola)	FW	João Batxi	2	0	1	0	3	0
20	(Brazil)	MF	Kady Borges	1	0	2	0	3	0
31	(Brazil)	DF	Kaio Pantaleão	6	1	0	0	6	1
33	(Armenia)	DF	Georgy Arutyunyan	1	0	0	0	1	0
39	(Russia)	GK	Matvei Safonov	2	0	1	0	3	0
40	(Nigeria)	FW	Olakunle Olusegun	2	0	0	0	2	0
80	(Russia)	DF	Yegor Sorokin	3	0	2	0	5	0
82	(Russia)	DF	Sergei Volkov	5	0	1	0	6	0
84	(Russia)	DF	Vyacheslav Litvinov	1	1	0	0	1	1
88	(Russia)	MF	Nikita Krivtsov	5	0	1	0	6	0
90	(Nigeria)	FW	Moses Cobnan	4	0	1	0	5	0
98	(Russia)	DF	Sergei Petrov	2	0	1	0	3	0
Players who suspended their contracts:
Players away on loan:
23	(Russia)	MF	Vyacheslav Yakimov	2	0	0	0	2	0
44	(Russia)	DF	Sergei Borodin	2	0	0	0	2	0
69	(Russia)	MF	Irakli Manelov	3	0	0	0	3	0
Players who left Krasnodar during the season:
			TOTALS	75	4	20	0	95	4
