= 2024–25 FC Torpedo Moscow season =

FC Torpedo Moscow
2024–25 season
- Manager: Oleg Kononov
- Stadium: Luzhniki Stadium
- Russian First League: 4th
- Russian Cup: Pre-season

The 2024–25 season is the 101st season in the history of FC Torpedo Moscow, and the club's second consecutive season in the Russian First League. In addition to the domestic league, the team is scheduled to participate in the Russian Cup.

== Transfers ==
=== In ===
Pos.	Player	Transferred to	Fee	Date	Source
FW	(Hungary) Márk Koszta	(Israel) Maccabi Bnei Reineh	Loan return	30 June 2024	

=== Out ===
Pos.	Player	Transferred to	Fee	Date	Source
FW	(Hungary) Márk Koszta	(Greece) Volos	Contract termination	8 July 2024	

== Friendlies ==
25 January 2025 Friendly	Lokomotiv Plovdiv (Bulgaria)	2–0	(Russia) Torpedo Moscow

== Competitions ==
=== Overall record ===
Competition	First match	Last match	Starting round	Record							
Competition	First match	Last match	Starting round	Pld	W	D	L	GF	GA	GD	Win %
Russian First League	14 July 2024		Matchday 1	4	2	2	0	7	2	+5	50.00
Russian Cup				0	0	0	0	0	0	+0	—
Total				4	2	2	0	7	2	+5	50.00

Last updated: 3 August 2024
Source: Soccerway

=== Russian First League ===
==== League table ====
Pos	Team	Pld	W	D	L	GF	GA	GD	Pts	Promotion, qualification or relegation
1	Baltika Kaliningrad (C, P)	34	19	12	3	50	18	+32	69	Promotion to Premier League
2	Torpedo Moscow (Note: The owner and the general director of Torpedo were arrested on 19 June 2025 and later charged with attempting to bribe a referee during the 2024–25 season. Russian Football Union conducted their own investigation. On 10 July 2025, Torpedo was excluded from the RPL for the 2025–26 season, cancelling their promotion. They remained in the Russian First League.)	34	17	14	3	51	25	+26	65	
3	Chernomorets Novorossiysk (Note: Chernomorets was not issued the 2025–26 RPL license and was replaced in the play-offs by Sochi.)	34	19	7	8	51	34	+17	64	
4	Ural Yekaterinburg	34	16	11	7	50	38	+12	59	Qualification to Premier League play-offs
5	Sochi (O, P)	34	16	9	9	55	34	+21	57	Qualification to Premier League play-offs

Source: Soccerway
Rules for classification: 1) Points; 2) Head-to-head points; 3) Head-to-head matches won; 4) Head-to-head goal difference; 5) Head-to-head goals scored; 6) Head-to-head away goals scored; 7) Matches won; 8) Goal difference; 9) Goals scored; 10) Away matches won; 11) Away goals scored; 12) Best disciplinary record (3 points for red card, 1 point for yellow card); 13) Drawing lots. If teams tied on points did not play an equal number of head-to-head games, head-to-head criteria and disciplinary record are not used for positioning. If 1st- and 2nd-placed teams are tied in the final standings on the first 12 criteria, a winner is determined in an additional play-off game, with no extra time and a penalty-shootout if tied at the end of regulation, instead of drawing lots.
(C) Champions; (O) Play-off winners; (P) Promoted

==== Results summary ====
Overall								Home						Away					
Pld	W	D	L	GF	GA	GD	Pts	W	D	L	GF	GA	GD	W	D	L	GF	GA	GD
28	13	12	3	42	21	+21	51	7	6	1	25	9	+16	6	6	2	17	12	+5

Last updated: 12 April 2025.
Source: soccerway

==== Results by round ====
Round	1	2	3	4	5	6	7	8	9	10	11	12	13	14	15	16	17	18	19	20	21	22	23	24	25	26	27	28	29	30	31	32	33	34
Ground	H	A	A	H	A	H	H	A	H	H	A	H	A	H	A	A	H	H	A	A	H	A	H	A	H	A	H	A	H	A	A	H	A	H
Result	W	D	W	D	D	W	D	W	D	W	D	D	D	W	W	D	W	W	D	W	W	L	D	W	D	W	L	L						
Position	1	4	3	4	5	3	3	3	3	2	3	2	2	1	1	1	1	1	2	2	2	2	2	2	2	2	2	2						

Updated to match(es) played on 12 April 2025. Source: worldfootball
A = Away; H = Home; W = Win; D = Draw; L = Loss

==== Matches ====
The tentative match schedule was released on 27 June.

14 July 2024 1	Torpedo Moscow	4–0	SKA-Khabarovsk	Khimki
18:30 UTC+3	Chervyakov 21'; Ćurić 47'; Gorbunov 81'; Shitov 85'			Stadium: Arena Khimki; Attendance: 1,420; Referee: Ivan Sidenkov

22 July 2024 2	FC Rotor Volgograd	1–1	Torpedo Moscow	Volgograd
18:00 UTC+3	Bolotov 66'		Gorbunov 18'	Stadium: Volgograd Arena; Attendance: 19,109; Referee: Ranel Ziyakov

27 July 2024 3	Yenisey Krasnoyarsk	0–1	Torpedo Moscow	Krasnoyarsk
14:00 UTC+3			Netfullin 90+4'	Stadium: Central Stadium

3 August 2024 4	Torpedo Moscow	1–1	Chayka Peschanokopskoye	Khimki
15:30 UTC+3	Chervyakov 34'		Kozhedub 32' (pen.)	Stadium: Arena Khimki

12 August 2024 5	KAMAZ	1–1	Torpedo Moscow	Nizhnekamsk
21:00 UTC+3	Abramov 54'	Report	Koryan (yellow card) 79'; Galkin 90+4'	Stadium: Neftekhimik Stadium; Attendance: 878; Referee: (Russia) German Kovalenko

17 August 2024 6	Torpedo Moscow	2–1	Neftekhimik	Moscow
20:25 UTC+3	Ivankov (yellow card) 28'; Koryan 32'; Manelov 35'	Report	Petrov 30' (yellow card) 88'; Sitdikov (yellow card) 39'; Shorkin (yellow card) 47'; Shiltsov (yellow card) 53'	Stadium: Luzhniki Stadium; Attendance: 4,942; Referee: (Russia) Oleg Sokolov

25 August 2024 7	Torpedo Moscow	1–1	Chernomorets	Khimki
18:00 UTC+3	Chupayov 56'; Gorbunov (yellow card) 80'	Report	Fomin (yellow card) 35'; Ivanov 59'	Stadium: Arena Khimki; Attendance: 1,051; Referee: (Russia) Inal Tanashev

31 August 2024 8	Ufa	0–1	Torpedo Moscow	Ufa
13:30 UTC+3	Adayev (yellow card) 6'; Perchenok (yellow card) 19'; Karpov (yellow card) 47'	Report	Sokolov 84'	Stadium: BetBoom Arena; Attendance: 2,320; Referee: (Russia) Kirill Silantyev

9 September 2024 9	Torpedo Moscow	2–2	Arsenal Tula	Khimki
20:00 UTC+3	Koryan 34'; Danilkin (yellow card) 36'; Berdnikov 42' (o.g.)	Report	Popov 8'; Tkachyov 39'; Levin (yellow card) 72'; Geloyan (yellow card) 83'	Stadium: Arena Khimki; Attendance: 1,036; Referee: (Russia) Sergey Tsyganok

16 September 2024 10	Torpedo Moscow	2–1	Baltika	Khimki
20:30 UTC+3	Netfullin 43' (pen.); Sokolov (yellow card) 51'; Maksimov 63'; Gorbunov (yellow card) 77'	Report	Avanesyan (yellow card) 12'; Lisakovich 53'; Pryakhin (yellow card) 61'	Stadium: Arena Khimki; Attendance: 1,091; Referee: (Russia) Ivan Saraev

21 September 2024 11	Shinnik	1–1	Torpedo Moscow	Yaroslavl
16:00 UTC+3	Artyom Malakhov 32' (yellow card) 66'	Report	Chupayov 65'	Stadium: Shinnik Stadium; Attendance: 4,039; Referee: (Russia) Nikolay Voloshin

29 September 2024 12	Torpedo Moscow	2–2	Sochi	Khimki
18:00 UTC+3	Borodin (yellow card) 36'; Chervyakov (yellow card) 78'; Gorbunov 83'; Maksimov 88'; Danilkin (yellow card) 90+4'; Roganović (yellow card) 90+6'	Report	Kramarič 45+1'; Suslov (yellow card) 68'; Melyoshin 90+1'	Stadium: Arena Khimki; Attendance: 1,132; Referee: (Russia) Yuriy Karpov

5 October 2024 13	Ural	1–1	Torpedo Moscow	Yekaterinburg
17:00 UTC+3	Sekulić 16'; Sungatulin (yellow card) 47'; Ayupov (yellow card) 72'; Begić (yellow card) 90+5'	Report	Borodin (yellow card) 63'; Netfullin 90+6' (pen.)	Stadium: Central Stadium; Attendance: 10,634; Referee: (Russia) Ranel Ziyakov

12 October 2024 14	Torpedo Moscow	5–0	Sokol Saratov	Khimki
18:00 UTC+3	Borodin 12'; Manelov 15'; Galkin 25'; Netfullin 51' 57' (pen.)	Report	Ivan Churikov (yellow card) 59'; Dudiyev (yellow card) 90+2'	Stadium: Arena Khimki; Attendance: 1,012; Referee: (Russia) Vladislav Tselovalnikov

21 October 2024 15	Tyumen	0–3	Torpedo Moscow	Tyumen
18:00 UTC+3	Andrey Maryanov (yellow card) 37'; Shavlokhov (yellow card) 55'	Report	Maksimov 18'; Manelov 45'; Koryan 67'; Camara (yellow card) 90'	Stadium: Geolog Stadium; Attendance: 1,485; Referee: (Russia) Bogdan Golovko

27 October 2024 16	Rodina Moscow	1–1	Torpedo Moscow	Moscow
19:00 UTC+3	Yushin 5'; Kané (yellow card) 44'; Kleshchenko (yellow card) 69'	Report	Netfullin 43'; Manelov (yellow card) 44'; Roganović (yellow card) 90+2'; Koryan (yellow card) 90+2'	Stadium: Sapsan Arena; Attendance: 1,344; Referee: (Russia) Artur Fedorov

2 November 2024 17	Torpedo Moscow	3–0	Alania Vladikavkaz	Khimki
19:00 UTC+3	Roganović 23'; Koledin 62'; Maksimov (yellow card) 85' (goal) 86'	Report	Pliyev (red card) 21'; Daurov (yellow card) 79'; Tatayev (yellow card) 85'	Stadium: Arena Khimki; Attendance: 953; Referee: (Russia) Igor Zakharov

9 November 2024 18	Torpedo Moscow	2–0	Yenisey	Khimki
17:00 UTC+3	Roganović 11'; Maksimov 65'; Shevchenko (yellow card) 90+2'	Report	Rukas (yellow card) 32'; Emmerson (yellow card) 61'	Stadium: Arena Khimki; Attendance: 1,032; Referee: (Russia) Oleg Sokolov

17 November 2024 19	SKA-Khabarovsk	2–2	Torpedo Moscow	Khabarovsk
08:00 UTC+3	Pokidyshev 33'; Simonyan (yellow card) 73'; Gongadze 90+1' (pen.); Poyarkov (red card) 90+4'	Report	Borodin 85'; Kostin 87'; Galkin (red card) 90+4'	Stadium: Lenin Stadium; Attendance: 707; Referee: (Russia) Andrey Fisenko

24 November 2024 20	Sokol Saratov	1–2	Torpedo Moscow	Saratov
13:00 UTC+3	Maksimenko 23'	Report	Manelov 5'; Borodin (yellow card) 18'; Chupayov 90'	Stadium: Lokomotiv Stadium; Attendance: 1,370; Referee: (Russia) Vladislav Tselovalnikov

1 December 2024 21	Torpedo Moscow	1–0	Tyumen	Khimki
16:00 UTC+3	Gorbunov 33'	Report	Klyonkin (yellow card) 43'; Mikhail Petrov (yellow card) 58'	Stadium: Arena Khimki; Attendance: 1,257; Referee: (Russia) German Kovalenko

=== Russian Cup ===
25 September 2024 Round Four	KAMAZ	1-2	Torpedo Moscow	Naberezhnye Chelny
20:30	Surkhaykhan Abdullayev 59'; Gorelov (yellow card) 71'; Ayukin (yellow card) 87'; Artyom Gyurdzhan (yellow card) 87'	Report	Koledin 35'; Shitov 51'; Gorbunov (yellow card) 80'; Galkin (yellow card) 87'	Stadium: KAMAZ Stadium; Attendance: 1,212; Referee: (Russia) Inal Tanashev

16 October 2024 Round Five	Torpedo Moscow	0-4	Baltika	Khimki
20:30	Chervyakov (yellow card) 24'; Baytukov (yellow card) 86'	Report	Alex Fernandes 19' (pen.) 50'; Stefanovich 37'; Zazvonkin 45+1'	Stadium: Arena Khimki; Attendance: 704; Referee: (Russia) Evgeniy Galimov
