= Mamadou Camara (footballer, born 18 February 2001) =

Malian footballer (born 2001)

Personal information
- Full name: Mamadou Harouna Camara
- Date of birth: 18 February 2001 (age 25)
- Place of birth: Bamako, Mali
- Height: 1.83 m (6 ft 0 in)
- Position: Midfielder

Team information
- Current team: Torpedo Moscow
- Number: 33

Youth career
- –2021: Black Stars

Senior career*
Years	Team	Apps	(Gls)
2022–2024	Black Stars		
2022–2024	→ Milsami Orhei (loan)	45	(9)
2024–	Torpedo Moscow	19	(1)
2025	→ Torpedo-BelAZ Zhodino (loan)	25	(3)
- * Club domestic league appearances and goals as of 16 May 2026

Mamadou Harouna Camara (born 18 February 2001) is a Malian footballer who plays as a midfielder for Russian club Torpedo Moscow.

== Club career ==
He made his Moldovan Super Liga debut for Milsami Orhei on 4 April 2022 in a game against Sfîntul Gheorghe.

== Career statistics ==
As of 16 May 2026

Club	Season	League			Cup		Continental		Total	
Club	Season	Division	Apps	Goals	Apps	Goals	Apps	Goals	Apps	Goals
Milsami Orhei (loan)	2021–22	Moldovan Liga	6	0	2	1	—		8	1
Milsami Orhei (loan)	2022–23	Moldovan Liga	17	3	1	1	4 (Note: Appearances in the UEFA Conference League)	1	22	5
Milsami Orhei (loan)	2023–24	Moldovan Liga	21	5	1	0	2	0	24	5
Milsami Orhei (loan)	2024–25	Moldovan Liga	1	1	—		—		1	1
Milsami Orhei (loan)	Total		45	9	4	2	6	1	55	12
Torpedo Moscow	2024–25	Russian First League	8	0	2	0	—		10	0
Torpedo Moscow	2025–26	Russian First League	11	1	—		—		11	1
Torpedo Moscow	Total		19	1	2	0	0	0	21	1
Torpedo-BelAZ Zhodino (loan)	2025	Belarusian Premier League	25	3	6	1	2	0	33	4
Career total			89	13	12	3	8	1	109	17
