= Aleksandr Chupayov =

Russian footballer (born 2004)

Personal information
- Full name: Aleksandr Aleksandrovich Chupayov
- Date of birth: 28 October 2004 (age 22)
- Place of birth: Ramenskoye, Russia
- Height: 1.90 m (6 ft 3 in)
- Position: Centre-forward

Team information
- Current team: Volgar Astrakhan
- Number: 9

Youth career
- 2011–2014: CDYuS Vympel Zhukovsky
- 2015–2018: Lokomotiv Moscow
- 2019–2020: SSh Meteor Zhukovsky
- 2021: Saturn Ramenskoye

Senior career*
| Years | Team | Apps | (Gls) |
| 2021 | Saturn Ramenskoye | 16 | (2) |
| 2022–2024 | Dynamo Moscow | 1 | (0) |
| 2022–2024 | → Dynamo-2 Moscow | 56 | (24) |
| 2024–2026 | Torpedo Moscow | 41 | (4) |
| 2026 | → Spartak Kostroma (loan) | 4 | (0) |
| 2026– | Volgar Astrakhan | 8 | (1) |

International career^{‡}
| 2021 | Russia U-18 | 5 | (1) |
| 2023– | Russia U-21 | 6 | (1) |
- * Club domestic league appearances and goals as of 15 November 2026 ‡ National team caps and goals as of 24 March 2025

Aleksandr Aleksandrovich Chupayov (Russian: Александр Александрович Чупаёв; born 28 August 2004) is a Russian football player who plays as a centre-forward for Volgar Astrakhan.

== Career ==
He made his debut in the Russian Premier League for Dynamo Moscow on 12 November 2023 in a game against Orenburg.

== Career statistics ==
As of match played 24 May 2025

Appearances and goals by club, season and competition
| Club | Season | League | | | Cup | | Other | | Total | |
| Club | Season | Division | Apps | Goals | Apps | Goals | Apps | Goals | Apps | Goals |
|---|---|---|---|---|---|---|---|---|---|---|
| Saturn Ramenskoye | 2021–22 | Russian Second League | 16 | 2 | 1 | 0 | – | | 17 | 2 |
| Dynamo-2 Moscow | 2021–22 | Russian Second League | 11 | 4 | – | | – | | 11 | 4 |
| Dynamo-2 Moscow | 2022–23 | Russian Second League | 16 | 4 | – | | – | | 16 | 4 |
| Dynamo-2 Moscow | 2023 | Russian Second League B | 14 | 9 | – | | – | | 14 | 9 |
| Dynamo-2 Moscow | 2024 | Russian Second League B | 15 | 7 | – | | – | | 15 | 7 |
| Dynamo-2 Moscow | Total | | 56 | 24 | – | | – | | 56 | 24 |
| Dynamo Moscow | 2023–24 | Russian Premier League | 1 | 0 | 0 | 0 | – | | 1 | 0 |
| Torpedo Moscow | 2024–25 | Russian First League | 24 | 3 | 0 | 0 | – | | 24 | 3 |
| Career total | | | 97 | 29 | 1 | 0 | 0 | 0 | 98 | 29 |
