= Dmitri Rebrov =

Russian footballer

Personal information
- Full name: Dmitri Pavlovich Rebrov
- Date of birth: 2 October 1997 (age 29)
- Place of birth: Moscow, Russia
- Height: 1.87 m (6 ft 2 in)
- Position: Goalkeeper

Team information
- Current team: FC Volna Nizhny Novgorod Oblast
- Number: 22

Senior career*
Years	Team	Apps	(Gls)
2015–2019	FSK Dolgoprudny	35	(0)
2019	FC Luch Vladivostok	0	(0)
2020–2023	FC Yenisey Krasnoyarsk	14	(0)
2022–2023	FC Yenisey-2 Krasnoyarsk	6	(0)
2024–2025	FC Chernomorets Novorossiysk	1	(0)
2025	FC Kosmos Dolgoprudny	23	(0)
2026–	FC Volna Nizhny Novgorod Oblast	28	(0)
- * Club domestic league appearances and goals as of 31 October 2026

Dmitri Pavlovich Rebrov (Russian: Дмитрий Павлович Ребров; born 2 October 1997) is a Russian football player who plays for FC Volna Nizhny Novgorod Oblast.

== Club career ==
He made his debut in the Russian Professional Football League for FSK Dolgoprudny on 30 April 2017 in a game against FC Volga Tver.

He played in all games in the 2019–20 Russian Cup campaign for FC Luch Vladivostok, in which Luch eliminated Premier League club FC Dynamo Moscow and Rebrov kept a clean sheet, before falling to another Premier League club FC Akhmat Grozny with a score of 1–5.
