= Ravil Netfullin =

Russian footballer

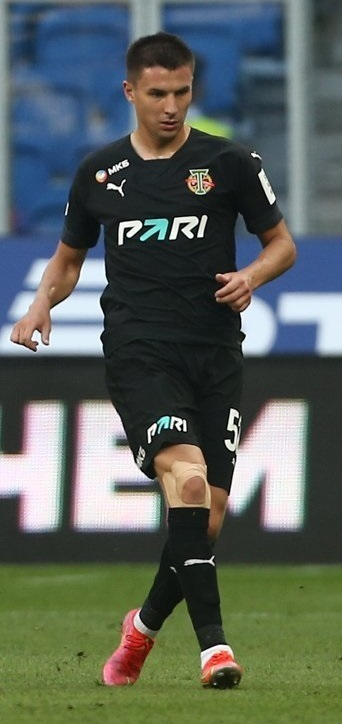
- Netfullin with Torpedo Moscow in 2022

Personal information
- Full name: Ravil Syagidovich Netfullin
- Date of birth: 3 March 1993 (age 33)
- Place of birth: Moscow, Russia
- Height: 1.83 m (6 ft 0 in)
- Position: Defensive midfielder

Team information
- Current team: Fakel Voronezh
- Number: 52

Youth career
- Moscow
- 2010–2013: CSKA Moscow

Senior career*
Years	Team	Apps	(Gls)
2012–2014	CSKA Moscow	8	(0)
2013–2014	→ Fakel Voronezh (loan)	15	(0)
2014–2016	Solyaris Moscow	50	(8)
2016–2017	Shinnik Yaroslavl	37	(2)
2017–2018	Avangard Kursk	36	(1)
2018–2020	Khimki	53	(2)
2020–2023	Torpedo Moscow	98	(4)
2023–2024	Khimki	30	(5)
2024–2025	Torpedo Moscow	31	(6)
2025–	Fakel Voronezh	47	(3)

International career^{‡}
2011	Russia U-18	2	(0)
2011	Russia U-19	4	(0)
2012–2013	Russia U-21	2	(0)
- * Club domestic league appearances and goals as of 21 November 2026 ‡ National team caps and goals as of 7 February 2013

Ravil Syagidovich Netfullin (Russian: Рави́ль Сяги́дович Нетфу́ллин; born 3 March 1993) is a Russian professional football player of Tatar descent who plays as a defensive midfielder or central midfielder for Fakel Voronezh.

== Club career ==
He made his debut in the Russian Premier League on 28 July 2012 for CSKA Moscow in a game against Amkar Perm.

He played in the 2017–18 Russian Cup final for Avangard Kursk on 9 May 2018 in the Volgograd Arena against 2–1 winners Tosno.

== Career statistics ==
As of 21 November 2026

Club	Season	League			Cup		Continental		Other		Total	
Club	Season	Division	Apps	Goals	Apps	Goals	Apps	Goals	Apps	Goals	Apps	Goals
CSKA Moscow	2012–13	Russian Premier League	8	0	2	0	0	0	0	0	10	0
Fakel Voronezh (loan)	2013–14	Russian Second League	15	0	0	0	–		–		15	0
Solyaris Moscow	2014–15	Russian Second League	22	3	–		–		–		22	3
Solyaris Moscow	2015–16	Russian Second League	28	5	1	0	–		–		29	5
Solyaris Moscow	Total		50	8	1	0	0	0	0	0	51	8
Shinnik Yaroslavl	2016–17	Russian First League	37	2	2	0	–		5 (Note: Appearances in FNL Cup)	1	44	3
Avangard Kursk	2017–18	Russian First League	36	1	6	0	–		–		42	1
Khimki	2018–19	Russian First League	33	1	2	0	–		5	0	40	1
Khimki	2019–20	Russian First League	20	1	2	0	–		–		22	1
Khimki	Total		53	2	4	0	0	0	5	0	62	2
Torpedo Moscow	2019–20	Russian First League	2	0	0	0	–		–		2	0
Torpedo Moscow	2020–21	Russian First League	40	3	1	0	–		–		41	3
Torpedo Moscow	2021–22	Russian First League	35	0	2	0	–		–		37	0
Torpedo Moscow	2022–23	Russian Premier League	21	1	6	0	–		–		27	1
Torpedo Moscow	Total		98	4	9	0	0	0	0	0	107	4
Khimki	2023–24	Russian First League	30	5	5	1	–		–		35	6
Khimki	Club total		83	7	9	1	0	0	5	0	97	8
Torpedo Moscow	2024–25	Russian First League	31	6	0	0	–		–		31	6
Torpedo Moscow	Club total		129	10	9	0	0	0	0	0	138	10
Fakel Voronezh	2025–26	Russian First League	33	2	1	0	–		–		34	2
Fakel Voronezh	2026–27	Russian Premier League	14	1	5	0	–		–		19	1
Fakel Voronezh	Total		47	3	6	0	0	0	0	0	53	3
Fakel Voronezh	Club total		62	3	6	0	0	0	0	0	68	3
Career total			405	31	35	1	0	0	10	1	450	33

== Honours ==
CSKA Moscow

- Russian Premier League (1): 2012–13
- Russian Cup (1): 2012–13

Torpedo Moscow

- Russian Football National League : 2021–22

Individual

- Russian Premier League goal of the month: September 2026 (against Baltika, 12 September).
