= Andrei Kostin =

Russian footballer

Personal information
- Full name: Andrei Nikolaievich Kostin
- Date of birth: 31 July 2002 (age 24)
- Place of birth: Yegoryevsk, Moscow Oblast, Russia
- Height: 1.91 m (6 ft 3 in)
- Positions: Midfielder; defender

Youth career
- –2011: Pioner Ramenskoye
- 2011–2013: Saturn Ramenskoye
- 2013–2014: Chertanovo Moscow
- 2014–2016: Saturn Ramenskoye
- 2017–2018: Pioner Ramenskoye

Senior career*
Years	Team	Apps	(Gls)
2019–2020	Saturn-2 Moscow Region (amateur)		
2020	Pioner Ramenskoye (amateur)		
2021	Znamya Noginsk	0	(0)
2021	Pioner Ramenskoye (amateur)		
2021–2023	Znamya Noginsk	30	(1)
2023	Leon Saturn Ramenskoye	16	(1)
2024–2025	Torpedo Moscow	26	(1)
- * Club domestic league appearances and goals as of 7 September 2025

Andrei Nikolaievich Kostin (Russian: Андрей Николаевич Костин; born 31 July 2002) is a Russian footballer who plays as a midfielder.

== Club career ==
Kostin made his debut in the Russian Second League for Znamya Noginsk on 29 August 2021 in a game against Rodina Moscow.

On 17 February 2024, he signed a contract with Torpedo Moscow.

On 2 March 2024, he made his debut in the Russian First League for Torpedo Moscow in a match against Leningradets Leningrad Oblast.

== Career statistics ==
As of 24 May 2025

Club	Season	League			Cup		Continental		Total	
Club	Season	Division	Apps	Goals	Apps	Goals	Apps	Goals	Apps	Goals
Znamya Noginsk	2021–22	Russian Second League	10	0	0	0	–		10	0
Znamya Noginsk	2022–23	Russian Second League	20	1	1	0	–		21	1
Znamya Noginsk	Total		30	1	1	0	0	0	31	1
Leon Saturn Ramenskoye	2023	Russian Second League B	16	1	2	0	–		18	1
Torpedo Moscow	2023–24	Russian First League	9	0	0	0	–		9	0
Torpedo Moscow	2024–25	Russian First League	13	1	2	0	–		15	1
Torpedo Moscow	Total		22	1	2	0	0	0	24	1
Career total			68	3	5	0	0	0	73	3
