= Ruslan Baytukov =

Russian footballer (born 1997)

Personal information
- Full name: Ruslan Nazarovich Baytukov
- Date of birth: 24 May 1997 (age 29)
- Place of birth: Rudny, Kazakhstan
- Height: 1.86 m (6 ft 1 in)
- Position: Defender

Youth career
- 2005–2012: DYuSSh Metar Chelyabinsk
- 2013–2014: SDYuSShOR Signal Chelyabinsk

Senior career*
| Years | Team | Apps | (Gls) |
| 2014–2018 | Shakhter Korkino (amateur) | | |
| 2015–2021 | Chelyabinsk | 102 | (11) |
| 2021–2023 | Rodina Moscow | 46 | (2) |
| 2023 | → Rodina-2 Moscow | 8 | (0) |
| 2023–2024 | Tyumen | 32 | (3) |
| 2024–2026 | Torpedo Moscow | 30 | (0) |
| 2026 | Chelyabinsk | 17 | (0) |
- * Club domestic league appearances and goals as of 5 September 2026

Ruslan Nazarovich Baytukov (Russian: Руслан Назарович Байтуков; born 24 May 1997) is a Russian and Kazakhstan footballer who plays as a defender.

== Club career ==
He made his debut in the Russian Second League for Chelyabinsk on 26 April 2016 in a game against Neftekhimik Nizhnekamsk.

He made his debut in the Russian First League for Rodina Moscow on 17 July 2022 in a game against Rubin Kazan.

On 6 June 2024, he signed a contract with Torpedo Moscow.

== Career statistics ==
As of 24 May 2025

| Club | Season | League | | | Cup | | Continental | | Other | | Total | |
| Club | Season | Division | Apps | Goals | Apps | Goals | Apps | Goals | Apps | Goals | Apps | Goals |
|---|---|---|---|---|---|---|---|---|---|---|---|---|
| Chelyabinsk | 2015–16 | Russian Second League | 2 | 0 | 0 | 0 | – | | – | | 2 | 0 |
| Chelyabinsk | 2016–17 | Russian Second League | 21 | 1 | 3 | 0 | – | | – | | 24 | 1 |
| Chelyabinsk | 2017–18 | Russian Second League | 18 | 1 | 1 | 0 | – | | – | | 19 | 1 |
| Chelyabinsk | 2018–19 | Russian Second League | 21 | 3 | 3 | 0 | – | | – | | 24 | 3 |
| Chelyabinsk | 2019–20 | Russian Second League | 16 | 5 | 1 | 0 | – | | – | | 17 | 5 |
| Chelyabinsk | 2020–21 | Russian Second League | 24 | 1 | 1 | 0 | – | | – | | 25 | 1 |
| Chelyabinsk | Total | | 102 | 11 | 9 | 0 | 0 | 0 | 0 | 0 | 111 | 11 |
| Rodina Moscow | 2021–22 | Russian Second League | 31 | 2 | 1 | 0 | – | | – | | 32 | 2 |
| Rodina Moscow | 2022–23 | Russian First League | 15 | 0 | 1 | 0 | – | | 2 (Note: Appearances in the promotion play-offs) | 0 | 18 | 0 |
| Rodina Moscow | Total | | 46 | 2 | 2 | 0 | 0 | 0 | 2 | 0 | 50 | 2 |
| Rodina-2 Moscow | 2022–23 | Russian Second League | 8 | 0 | – | | – | | – | | 8 | 0 |
| Tyumen | 2023–24 | Russian First League | 32 | 3 | 0 | 0 | – | | – | | 32 | 3 |
| Torpedo Moscow | 2024–25 | Russian First League | 16 | 0 | 2 | 0 | – | | – | | 18 | 0 |
| Career total | | | 204 | 16 | 13 | 0 | 0 | 0 | 2 | 0 | 219 | 16 |
