= FC Volna Nizhny Novgorod Oblast =

Russian football club

- Full name: Football Club Volna Nizhny Novgorod Oblast
- Founded: 2016
- Ground: Zavolzhsky Stadium, Zavolzhye
- Capacity: 1,500
- Manager: Andriy Proshyn
- League: Russian Second League, Division B, Group 3
- 2026: 2nd
- Website: fcvolna.ru
| Home colours | Away colours |

FC Volna Nizhny Novgorod Oblast (Russian: ФК «Волна» Нижегородская Область) is a Russian football team that represents Nizhny Novgorod Oblast as a whole. It was previously based in Kovernino and since 2024 plays home games in Zavolzhye.

== Club history ==
It was founded in 2016 and played on the amateur level as FC Volna Kovernino. For 2020–21 season, it received the license for the third-tier Russian Professional Football League. For the occasion, it also changed the name to represent the whole Nizhny Novgorod Oblast. The club did not receive professional license for the 2022–23 season and moved down to amateur levels.

Before the 2024 season, a different Second League club FC Elektron Veliky Novgorod was moved to Nizhny Novgorod and was renamed to Volna.

== Current squad ==
As of 11 September 2026, according to the Second League website.

Note: Flags indicate national team as defined under FIFA eligibility rules; some limited exceptions apply. Players may hold more than one non-FIFA nationality.

| No. | Pos. | Nation | Player |
|---|---|---|---|
| 1 | GK | RUS | Ivan Migunov |
| 2 | MF | RUS | Ivan Semyonov |
| 4 | DF | RUS | Artyom Abramov |
| 6 | MF | RUS | Ruslan Kazakov |
| 7 | MF | RUS | Artemi Gunko |
| 8 | FW | RUS | Mikhail Zabotkin |
| 9 | FW | RUS | Gocha Gogrichiani |
| 10 | FW | RUS | Kirill Bogdanets |
| 11 | FW | RUS | Yevgeni Ragulkin |
| 14 | MF | RUS | Aleksey Titkov |
| 17 | MF | RUS | Dmitry Kalayda |
| 19 | MF | RUS | Nikita Romanov |
| 20 | FW | RUS | Artyom Tarasov |
| 21 | DF | RUS | Denis Kaykov |

| No. | Pos. | Nation | Player |
|---|---|---|---|
| 22 | GK | RUS | Dmitri Rebrov |
| 30 | DF | RUS | Aleksandr Volkov |
| 47 | GK | RUS | Aleksandr Shashkov |
| 52 | MF | RUS | Ivan Ananyev (on loan from CSKA Moscow) |
| 73 | DF | RUS | Artyom Yamangulov |
| 74 | DF | RUS | Arseny Yagodkin |
| 76 | MF | RUS | Maksim Gavrilov |
| 77 | DF | RUS | Erik Gubiyev |
| 88 | MF | RUS | Aleksandr Popovich |
| 90 | MF | RUS | Ivan Severyanov |
| 91 | FW | RUS | Nikita Chugunov |
| 92 | FW | RUS | Pavel Popov |
| 95 | DF | RUS | Kirill Belov |
| 99 | DF | RUS | Ivan Savitsky |
