= Ruslan Chervyakov =

Ukrainian-born Russian footballer (born 2005)

Personal information
- Full name: Ruslan Maksymovych Chervyakov
- Date of birth: 18 February 2005 (age 21)
- Place of birth: Dnipropetrovsk, Ukraine
- Height: 1.81 m (5 ft 11 in)
- Position: Forward

Team information
- Current team: Spartak Kostroma
- Number: 70

Youth career
- 2014–2019: Dnipro
- 2020: Shakhtar Donetsk
- 2021: Inhulets Petrove
- 2022: Valencia
- 2022–2023: Gil Vicente

Senior career*
| Years | Team | Apps | (Gls) |
| 2023–2025 | Torpedo Moscow | 50 | (3) |
| 2025–2026 | Chayka Peschanokopskoye | 23 | (2) |
| 2026– | Spartak Kostroma | 0 | (0) |
- * Club domestic league appearances and goals as of 16 May 2026

Ruslan Maksymovych Chervyakov (Russian: Руслан Максимович Червяков; Ukrainian: Руслан Максимович Черв'яков; born 18 February 2005) is a Russian and Ukrainian professional footballer who plays for Russian club Spartak Kostroma.

== Club career ==
He made his debut in the Russian First League for Torpedo Moscow on 5 August 2023 in a game against Sokol Saratov.

== Career statistics ==
As of 24 May 2025

| Club | Season | League | | | Cup | | Continental | | Total | |
| Club | Season | Division | Apps | Goals | Apps | Goals | Apps | Goals | Apps | Goals |
|---|---|---|---|---|---|---|---|---|---|---|
| Torpedo Moscow | 2023–24 | Russian First League | 19 | 1 | 0 | 0 | – | | 19 | 1 |
| Torpedo Moscow | 2024–25 | Russian First League | 24 | 3 | 2 | 0 | – | | 26 | 3 |
| Torpedo Moscow | Total | | 43 | 4 | 2 | 0 | 0 | 0 | 45 | 4 |
| Career total | | | 43 | 4 | 2 | 0 | 0 | 0 | 45 | 4 |
