= Jhon Córdoba =

Colombian footballer (born 1993)

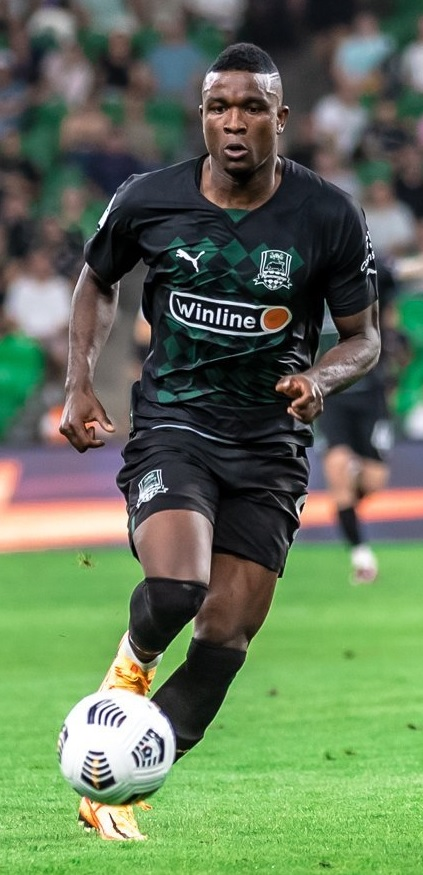
- Córdoba playing for Krasnodar in 2022

Personal information
- Full name: Jhon Andrés Córdoba Copete
- Date of birth: 11 May 1993 (age 33)
- Place of birth: Istmina, Colombia
- Height: 1.88 m (6 ft 2 in)
- Position: Forward

Team information
- Current team: Krasnodar
- Number: 9

Senior career*
Years	Team	Apps	(Gls)
2010–2012	Envigado	37	(11)
2012–2013	Chiapas	17	(1)
2013–2014	Querétaro	0	(0)
2013	→ Dorados (loan)	1	(0)
2013–2014	→ Espanyol (loan)	28	(4)
2014–2015	Granada	26	(4)
2015–2016	→ Mainz 05 (loan)	22	(5)
2016–2017	Mainz 05	29	(5)
2017–2020	1. FC Köln	78	(33)
2020–2021	Hertha BSC	21	(7)
2021–	Krasnodar	129	(71)

International career^{‡}
2013	Colombia U20	17	(6)
2019–	Colombia	24	(6)
Medal record
Men's football
Representing Colombia
Copa América
Runner-up	2024 United States
- * Club domestic league appearances and goals as of 22 November 2026 ‡ National team caps and goals as of 4 July 2026

Jhon Andrés Córdoba Copete (Spanish pronunciation: [ɟʝoŋ ˈkoɾðoβa]; born 11 May 1993) is a Colombian professional footballer who plays as a forward for Russian Premier League club Krasnodar and the Colombia national team.

A powerful striker noted for his pace and strength, Córdoba began his senior career with Envigado before moving abroad to Chiapas in Mexico in 2012. After spells in Spain with Espanyol and Granada, and in Germany with Mainz 05, he joined Köln in 2017. There, he finished as the club's top scorer and secured promotion to the Bundesliga. He later played for Hertha BSC before transferring to Krasnodar in 2021, where he helped the club win their first Russian Premier League title in 2025. Subsequently, Córdoba was recognised as Russian Footballer of the Year for the 2024–25 and 2025–26 seasons.

At international level, Córdoba was part of the Colombia U20 side that won the South American U20 Championship in 2013. He made his senior debut in 2019 and has since earned over 15 caps, featuring at the 2024 Copa América, where Colombia finished runner-ups.

== Club career ==
=== Envigado and professional breakthrough ===
A youth product of Envigado, Córdoba made his senior debut in 2009, scoring on his debut against Itagüí. He broke through during the 2011 Torneo Finalización, notably scoring a brace in a 3–2 defeat away to Once Caldas on 1 October 2011, and netting the winner against Independiente Medellín two weeks later. He remained a starter into the 2012 Apertura, finishing as Envigado's top league scorer with six goals in 16 matches.

=== Chiapas ===
On 9 July 2012, Córdoba moved to Mexico, joining Querétaro and being loaned immediately to Jaguares de Chiapas. He made his Liga MX debut on 20 July 2012 against Tigres UANL, and scored his first Liga MX goal in a 4–0 home win over San Luis on 7 October 2012. He went on to score three goals in total for Chiapas during the 2012–13 campaign.

=== Espanyol (loan) ===
On 2 September 2013, Córdoba joined Espanyol on a one-year loan with an option to buy. He scored his first La Liga goal for the club on 30 November 2013 in a 2–1 loss away to Real Sociedad. His second league goal came on 25 January 2014 in a 2–2 draw against Valencia. He finished the season with four goals, proving a reliable attacking option.

=== Granada ===
On 12 August 2014, Córdoba signed a five-year deal with Granada. He scored the winner in a 1–0 victory over Athletic Bilbao at San Mamés on 20 September 2014, converting a defensive error on his first start for the club. He later described it as “my debut as a starter” and said he took the opportunity by scoring.

=== Mainz 05 ===
Córdoba joined Mainz 05 on loan from Granada on 31 August 2015, and on 2 March 2016 scored the late winner in a 2–1 victory over Bayern Munich. Mainz exercised their option to sign him permanently in May 2016. He also scored in Mainz's 3–2 UEFA Europa League group stage win against Qabala on 29 September.

=== 1. FC Köln ===
On 28 June 2017, Córdoba transferred to fellow German side 1. FC Köln on a four-year deal. In the 2018–19 season, he scored 20 league goals as Köln won the title and promotion. On 6 May 2019 he scored a hat-trick in a 4–0 win over SpVgg Greuther Fürth, clinching the championship. On 18 January 2020, he registered his first Bundesliga brace in a 3–1 win over VfL Wolfsburg.

=== Hertha BSC ===
On 15 September 2020, Córdoba joined Hertha BSC on a four-year contract. He scored on his Bundesliga debut for the club in a 4–1 away win at Werder Bremen on 19 September. He finished the season as the club's joint-top scorer with seven goals.

=== Krasnodar ===
On 18 July 2021, Hertha announced an agreement to sell Córdoba to Russian side Krasnodar. He signed a four-year contract with Krasnodar on 23 July. His contract was suspended in March 2022 amid the league's hiatus, before he returned to action later that year.

On 5 November 2024, Krasnodar announced his extension through 30 June 2027. In the 2024–25 season, he scored in the decisive final-round win over Dynamo Moscow as Krasnodar clinched their first Russian Premier League title, and was later voted the league's Footballer of the Year by fellow players.

On 30 November 2025, Córdoba scored his 69th goal for Krasnodar, becoming the top scorer in club history, overtaking Fyodor Smolov. With the same goal, he also took the top spot in club history for goals plus assists with 96. On 21 March 2026, Córdoba scored four goals against Pari Nizhny Novgorod. He became the 2025–26 Russian Premier League top scorer with 17 goals and was voted league's Footballer of the Year for the second consecutive season.

== International career ==
=== Youth ===
==== 2013 South American Youth Championship ====
Córdoba was selected to wear the number 9 jersey to represent Colombia at the 2013 South American Youth Championship. He scored the decisive goal in the opening match against Paraguay, securing a 1–0 victory. In the following game against Bolivia, he netted two goals in a commanding 6–0 win despite missing several promising opportunities. Consequently, he was not selected for the final group stage match against Argentina, as Colombia had already secured a spot in the next round. Córdoba scored the winning goal in a 1–0 victory over Uruguay, propelling Colombia to the top of their group. Following their triumph in the South American championship, he tallied four goals, significantly contributing to his nation's success. This achievement made him Colombia's second-highest scorer in the tournament, just behind Juan Fernando Quintero, who scored five goals.

==== 2013 U-20 FIFA World Cup ====
In the opening match against Australia, Córdoba missed several opportunities while Colombia trailed 1–0. However, he redeemed himself by scoring in the 78th minute, securing a 1–1 draw. In the final group match against El Salvador, Córdoba successfully converted a penalty, contributing to a 3–0 victory. He played in the round of 16 match against South Korea, where Colombia was eliminated in a penalty shootout following a 1–1 draw.

=== Senior ===
He was first called up in the preliminary list for friendly matches against Chile and Algeria on 12 and 15 October 2019 respectively. In 2020, he was called up to the Colombia preliminary squad for 2022 FIFA World Cup qualification against Venezuela and Chile on 26 and 31 March 2020 respectively. However, he made his first appearance for the senior team as late as 2023.

He made his debut on 16 November 2023 in a 2–1 victory over Brazil during the FIFA World Cup qualifiers. He scored his first international goal in a 3–2 win against Romania in an international friendly.

On 28 June 2024, he scored his first competitive international goal in a 3–0 victory over Costa Rica during the group stage of the 2024 Copa América. He also won a penalty for his team in the match. He scored his second competitive international goal against Panama in the quarter-finals.

On 25 May 2026, he was named in head coach Néstor Lorenzo's final 26-man squad for the 2026 FIFA World Cup. He made his FIFA World Cup debut on 24 June in a 1–0 victory over the DR Congo, coming on as a substitute for Luis Javier Suárez in the 58th minute.

On 3 July, during his third appearance at the tournament in the Round of 32 against Ghana, he suffered a hamstring tear in the opening minutes of the match and was forced off injured. It was subsequently confirmed that he would miss the remainder of the tournament, with an expected recovery period of four weeks.

== Style of play ==
Córdoba is a striker noted for his physical attributes, including height and strength, as well as for his shooting ability and pace. His stature has contributed to his effectiveness in aerial play, and he has occasionally been compared to Didier Drogba.

== Personal life ==
Córdoba's father Manuel was also a professional football striker.

== Career statistics ==
=== Club ===
As of match played 22 November 2026

Appearances and goals by club, season and competition
Club	Season	League			National cup (Note: Includes Copa Colombia, Copa MX, Copa del Rey, DFB-Pokal, Russian Cup)		Continental		Other		Total	
Club	Season	Division	Apps	Goals	Apps	Goals	Apps	Goals	Apps	Goals	Apps	Goals
Envigado	2010	Categoría Primera A	1	0	0	0	—		—		1	0
Envigado	2011	Categoría Primera A	20	5	8	2	—		—		28	7
Envigado	2012	Categoría Primera A	16	6	2	0	—		—		18	6
Envigado	Total		37	11	10	2	0	0	0	0	47	13
Chiapas	2012–13	Liga MX	17	1	4	1	—		—		21	2
Espanyol (loan)	2013–14	La Liga	28	4	5	0	—		—		33	4
Granada	2014–15	La Liga	22	5	2	1	—		—		24	6
Mainz 05 (loan)	2015–16	Bundesliga	22	5	0	0	—		—		22	5
Mainz 05	2016–17	Bundesliga	29	5	2	2	6 (Note: Appearances in UEFA Europa League)	1	—		37	8
Mainz 05	Total		51	10	2	2	6	1	0	0	59	13
1. FC Köln	2017–18	Bundesliga	18	0	1	1	3	1	—		22	2
1. FC Köln	2018–19	2. Bundesliga	31	20	2	1	—		—		33	21
1. FC Köln	2019–20	Bundesliga	29	13	2	1	—		—		31	14
1. FC Köln	Total		78	33	5	3	3	1	0	0	86	37
Hertha BSC	2020–21	Bundesliga	21	7	0	0	—		—		21	7
Krasnodar	2021–22	Russian Premier League	15	6	1	0	—		—		16	6
Krasnodar	2022–23	Russian Premier League	23	14	14	7	—		—		37	21
Krasnodar	2023–24	Russian Premier League	27	15	5	3	—		—		32	18
Krasnodar	2024–25	Russian Premier League	25	12	5	1	—		—		30	13
Krasnodar	2025–26	Russian Premier League	28	17	12	5	—		1 (Note: Appearance in Russian Super Cup)	0	41	22
Krasnodar	2026–27	Russian Premier League	11	7	2	0	—		—		13	7
Krasnodar	Total		129	71	39	16	0	0	1	0	169	87
Career total			383	142	67	25	9	2	1	0	460	169

=== International ===
As of match played 3 July 2026

Appearances and goals by national team and year
National team	Year	Apps	Goals
Colombia	2023	2	0
Colombia	2024	13	4
Colombia	2025	4	2
Colombia	2026	5	0
Total		24	6

Scores and results list Colombia's goal tally first.

List of international goals scored by Jhon Córdoba
No.	Date	Venue	Opponent	Score	Result	Competition
1.	26 March 2024	Metropolitano Stadium, Madrid, Spain	Romania	1–0	3–2	Friendly
2.	15 June 2024	Pratt & Whitney Stadium, East Hartford, United States	Bolivia	2–0	3–0	Friendly
3.	28 June 2024	State Farm Stadium, Glendale, United States	Costa Rica	3–0	3–0	2024 Copa América
4.	6 July 2024	State Farm Stadium, Glendale, United States	Panama	1–0	5–0	2024 Copa América
5.	4 September 2025	Estadio Metropolitano Roberto Meléndez, Barranquilla, Colombia	Bolivia	2–0	3–0	2026 FIFA World Cup qualification
6.	9 September 2025	Estadio Monumental, Maturín, Venezuela	Venezuela	6–3	6–3	2026 FIFA World Cup qualification

== Honours ==
1. FC Köln

- 2. Bundesliga: 2018–19

Krasnodar

- Russian Premier League: 2024–25

Colombia U20

- South American Youth Championship: 2013

Individual

- Russian Premier League top scorer: 2025–26 (17 goals).
- Russian Premier League Player of the Month: October 2024
- Russian Premier League Goal of the Month: October 2024 (on 28 October 2024 against Krylia Sovetov Samara)
- Russian Premier League Forward of the Season: 2025–26
- Footballer of the Year in Russia: 2024–25, 2025–26
