= Danil Karpov =

Russian footballer

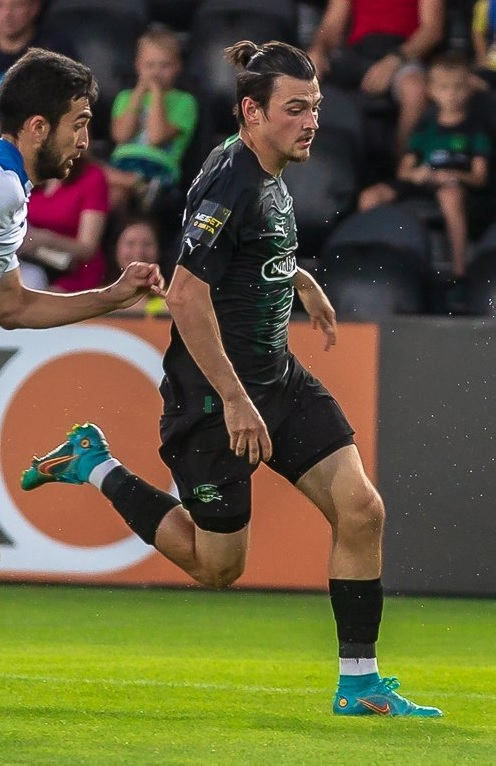
- Karpov with FC Krasnodar-2 in 2022

Personal information
- Full name: Danil Aleksandrovich Karpov
- Date of birth: 28 June 1999 (age 27)
- Height: 1.79 m (5 ft 10 in)
- Position: Forward

Senior career*
Years	Team	Apps	(Gls)
2017–2022	Tyumen	104	(43)
2022–2024	Krasnodar-2	60	(12)
2022–2025	Krasnodar	0	(0)
2024–2025	→ Tyumen (loan)	26	(1)
- * Club domestic league appearances and goals as of 24 May 2025

Danil Aleksandrovich Karpov (Russian: Данил Александрович Карпов; born 28 June 1999) is a Russian football player.

== Club career ==
He made his debut in the Russian Football National League for Tyumen on 6 May 2017 in a game against Shinnik Yaroslavl.

On 16 June 2022, Karpov signed a three-year contract with Russian Premier League club Krasnodar. Karpov made his debut for Krasnodar's main squad on 31 August 2022 in a Russian Cup game against Khimki.

On 30 July 2024, Karpov returned to Tyumen on loan.

== Career statistics ==
As of 27 November 2022

Club	Season	League			Cup		Continental		Other		Total	
Club	Season	Division	Apps	Goals	Apps	Goals	Apps	Goals	Apps	Goals	Apps	Goals
Tyumen	2016–17	First League	1	0	–		–		–		1	0
Tyumen	2017–18	First League	16	2	1	1	–		4 (Note: Appearances in the FNL Cup)	0	21	3
Tyumen	2018–19	First League	23	3	2	1	–		3	1	28	5
Tyumen	2019–20	Second League	12	2	1	0	–		–		13	2
Tyumen	2020–21	Second League	25	15	2	0	–		–		27	15
Tyumen	2021–22	Second League	27	21	3	2	–		–		30	23
Tyumen	Total		104	43	9	4	0	0	7	1	120	48
Krasnodar-2	2022–23	First League	15	4	–		–		–		15	4
Krasnodar	2022–23	RPL	0	0	2	0	–		–		2	0
Career total			119	47	11	4	0	0	7	1	137	52
