= Irakli Manelov =

Russian footballer (born 2002)

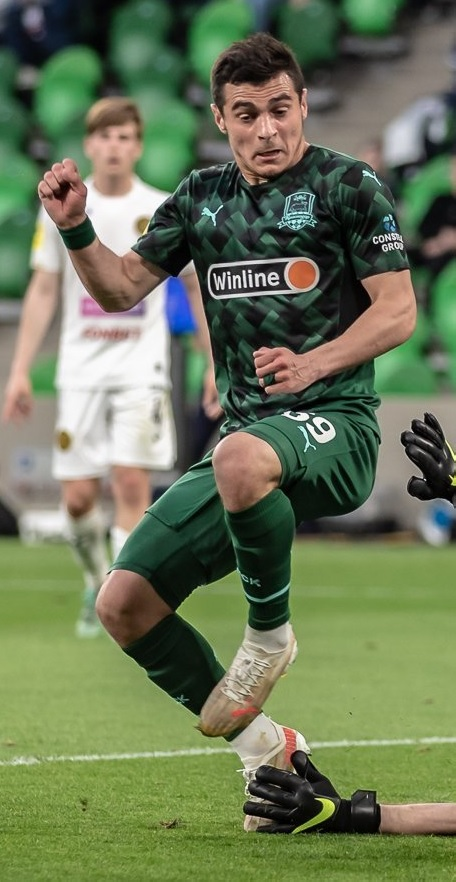
- Manelov with Krasnodar in 2022

Personal information
- Full name: Irakli Mikhaylovich Manelov
- Date of birth: 19 September 2002 (age 24)
- Place of birth: Vyselki, Russia
- Height: 1.72 m (5 ft 8 in)
- Position: Midfielder

Team information
- Current team: Rotor Volgograd (on loan from Baltika Kaliningrad)
- Number: 2

Youth career
- 2009–2019: Krasnodar

Senior career*
Years	Team	Apps	(Gls)
2019–2023	Krasnodar	22	(1)
2019	→ Krasnodar-3	11	(1)
2021–2023	→ Krasnodar-2	34	(5)
2023	→ Arsenal Tula (loan)	13	(2)
2023–2025	Torpedo Moscow	69	(6)
2025–	Baltika Kaliningrad	16	(0)
2026–	→ Rotor Volgograd (loan)	0	(0)
- * Club domestic league appearances and goals as of 23 April 2026

Irakli Mikhaylovich Manelov (Russian: Ираклий Михайлович Манелов; born 19 September 2002) is a Russian football player of Pontic Greek origin who plays for Rotor Volgograd on loan from Baltika Kaliningrad.

== Club career ==
He made his debut in the Russian Football National League for Krasnodar-2 on 10 July 2021 in a game against Spartak-2 Moscow.

He made his Russian Premier League debut for Krasnodar on 18 September 2021 in a game against Akhmat Grozny.

In January 2023, Manelov signed for Arsenal Tula on loan until the end of the season.

On 20 June 2023, Manelov signed a three-year contract with Torpedo Moscow.

On 19 August 2025, Manelov joined Baltika Kaliningrad, with a contract until 10 June 2028. On 2 September 2026, he was loaned by Baltika to Rotor Volgograd.

== Career statistics ==
As of 23 April 2026

Club	Season	League			Cup		Total	
Club	Season	Division	Apps	Goals	Apps	Goals	Apps	Goals
Krasnodar-3	2019–20	Russian Second League	11	1	–		11	1
Krasnodar-2	2021–22	Russian First League	23	5	–		23	5
Krasnodar-2	2022–23	Russian First League	11	0	–		11	0
Krasnodar-2	Total		34	5	0	0	34	5
Krasnodar	2021–22	Russian Premier League	13	1	1	0	14	1
Krasnodar	2022–23	Russian Premier League	9	0	2	0	11	0
Krasnodar	Total		22	1	3	0	25	1
Arsenal Tula (loan)	2022–23	Russian First League	13	2	0	0	13	2
Torpedo Moscow	2023–24	Russian First League	32	2	0	0	32	2
Torpedo Moscow	2024–25	Russian First League	34	4	1	0	35	4
Torpedo Moscow	2025–26	Russian First League	3	0	0	0	3	0
Torpedo Moscow	Total		69	6	1	0	70	6
Baltika Kaliningrad	2025–26	Russian Premier League	16	0	6	0	22	0
Career total			165	15	10	0	175	15
