= Mihajlo Banjac =

Serbian footballer

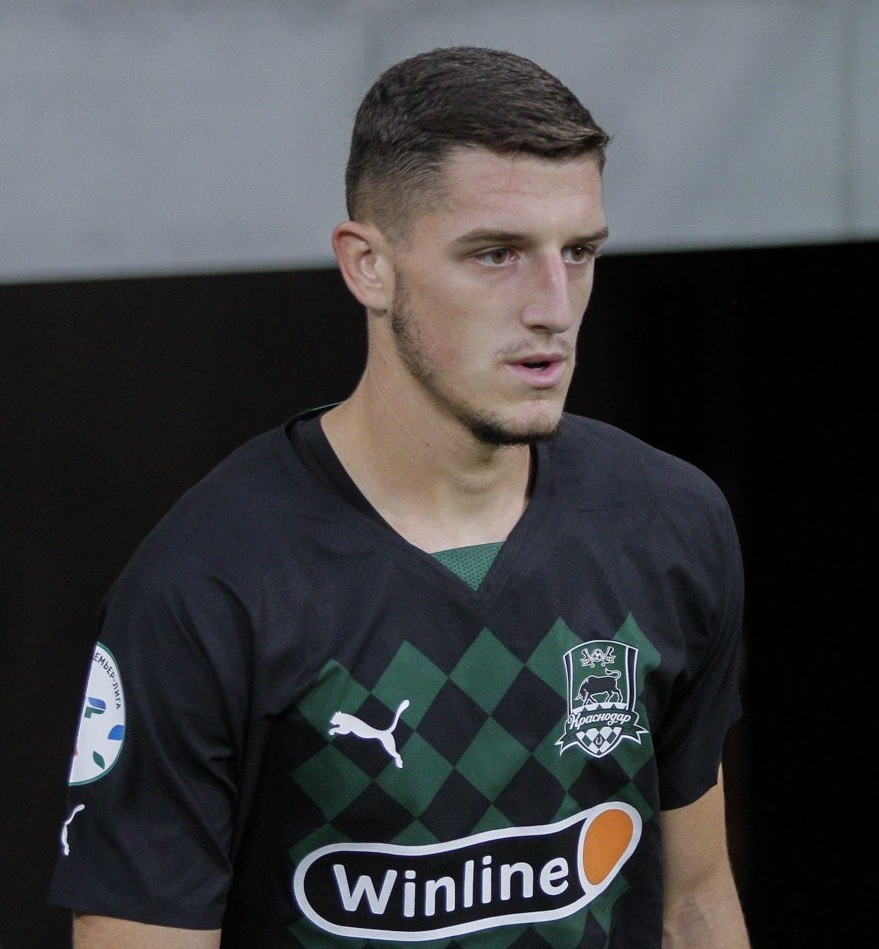
- Banjac with Krasnodar in 2022

Personal information
- Date of birth: 10 November 1999 (age 27)
- Place of birth: Novi Sad, FR Yugoslavia
- Height: 1.86 m (6 ft 1 in)
- Position: Central midfielder

Team information
- Current team: Krylia Sovetov Samara
- Number: 7

Youth career
- Inđija

Senior career*
Years	Team	Apps	(Gls)
2017–2020	Inđija	48	(6)
2020–2022	TSC	75	(15)
2022–2025	Krasnodar	45	(3)
2024–2025	→ TSC (loan)	19	(1)
2025–	Krylia Sovetov Samara	36	(0)
- * Club domestic league appearances and goals as of 20 November 2026

Mihajlo Banjac (Serbian Cyrillic: Михајло Бањац; born 10 November 1999) is a Serbian professional footballer who plays as a central midfielder for Russian club Krylia Sovetov Samara.

== Club career ==
On 15 July 2022, Russian Premier League club FC Krasnodar announced Banjac's transfer. On 20 July 2022, Banjac signed a four-year contract with Krasnodar.

On 3 July 2024, Banjac returned to TSC on a season-long loan.

On 16 July 2025, Banjac signed a three-season contract with Krylia Sovetov Samara in Russia.

== Career statistics ==
As of match played 20 November 2026

Appearances and goals by club, season and competition
Club	Season	League			Cup		Continental		Other		Total	
Club	Season	Division	Apps	Goals	Apps	Goals	Apps	Goals	Apps	Goals	Apps	Goals
Inđija	2016–17	Serbian First League	1	0	0	0	—		—		1	0
Inđija	2017–18	Serbian First League	0	0	0	0	—		—		0	0
Inđija	2018–19	Serbian First League	27	5	1	0	—		3 (Note: Appearances in the promotion play-offs)	0	31	5
Inđija	2019–20	Serbian SuperLiga	20	1	2	0	—		—		22	1
Inđija	Total		48	6	3	0	0	0	3	0	54	6
TSC	2020–21	Serbian SuperLiga	38	7	2	0	2 (Note: Appearances in the UEFA Europa League)	0	—		42	7
TSC	2021–22	Serbian SuperLiga	36	7	2	0	—		—		38	7
TSC	2022–23	Serbian SuperLiga	1	1	—		—		—		1	1
TSC	Total		75	15	4	0	2	0	0	0	81	15
Krasnodar	2022–23	Russian Premier League	27	3	13	0	—		—		40	3
Krasnodar	2023–24	Russian Premier League	18	0	7	0	—		—		25	0
Krasnodar	Total		45	3	20	0	—		—		65	3
TSC (loan)	2024–25	Serbian SuperLiga	19	1	1	1	7 (Note: One appearance in UEFA Europa League, six appearances in UEFA Conference League)	0	—		27	2
Krylia Sovetov Samara	2025–26	Russian Premier League	27	0	8	1	—		—		35	1
Krylia Sovetov Samara	2026–27	Russian Premier League	9	0	4	1	—		—		13	1
Krylia Sovetov Samara	Total		36	0	12	2	—		—		48	2
Career total			223	25	40	3	9	0	3	0	275	28

== Honours ==
Individual

- Serbian SuperLiga Player of the Week: 2021–22 (Round 3), 2022–23 (Round 1)
