= Bojan Roganović =

Montenegrin footballer

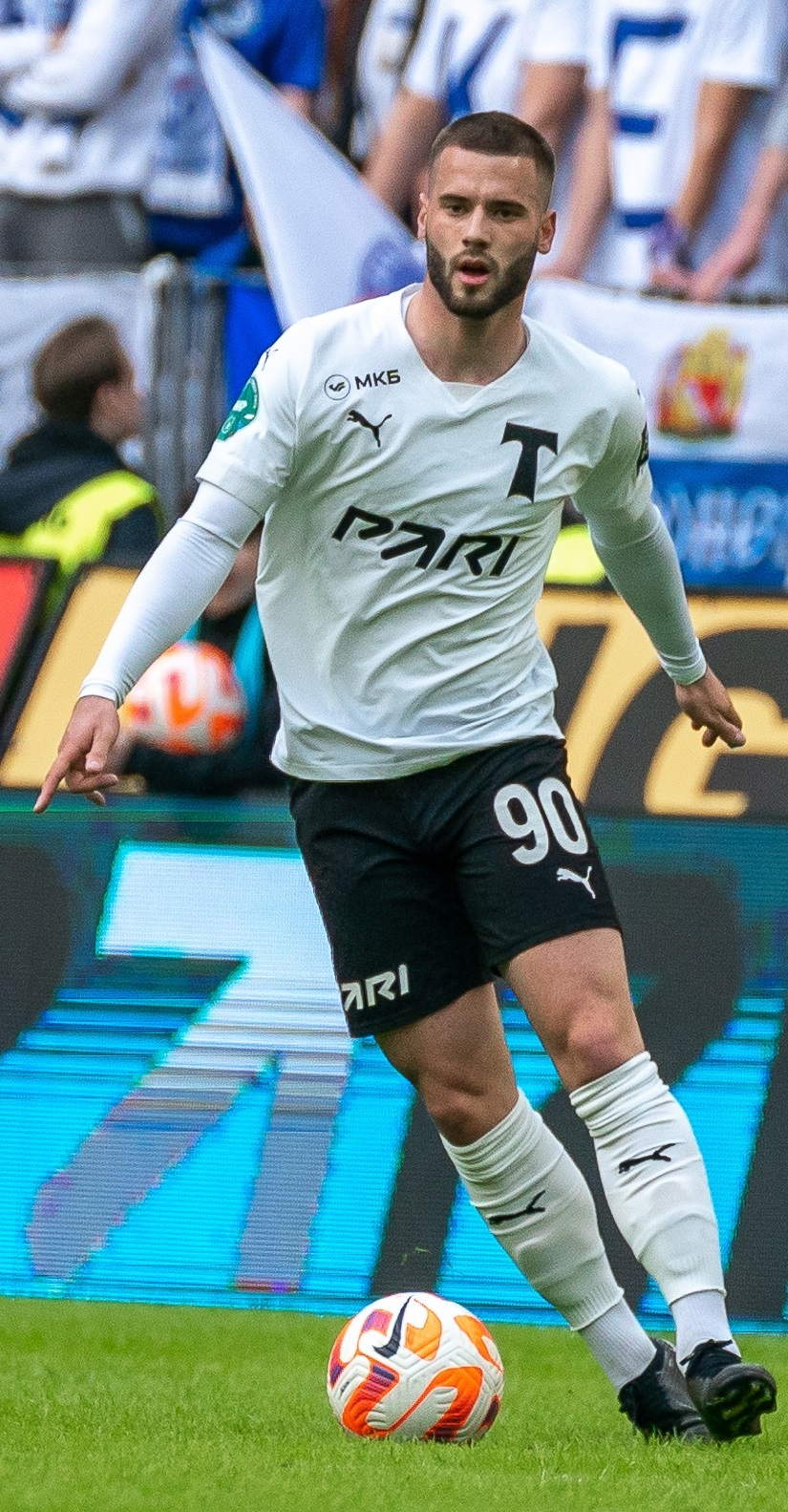
- Roganović with Torpedo Moscow in 2023

Personal information
- Date of birth: 28 September 2000 (age 26)
- Place of birth: Podgorica, Serbia and Montenegro
- Height: 1.81 m (5 ft 11 in)
- Position: Left-back

Team information
- Current team: Torpedo Moscow
- Number: 90

Youth career
- –2017: Budućnost Podgorica

Senior career*
Years	Team	Apps	(Gls)
2018–2019	Budućnost Podgorica	26	(0)
2020–2021	OFK Titograd	38	(0)
2021–2022	Čukarički	32	(1)
2022–	Torpedo Moscow	81	(2)

International career^{‡}
2016–2017	Montenegro U17	6	(0)
2017–2018	Montenegro U19	6	(0)
2019–2020	Montenegro U21	5	(0)
- * Club domestic league appearances and goals as of 16 May 2026 ‡ National team caps and goals as of 17 November 2020

Bojan Roganović (born 28 September 2000) is a Montenegrin footballer who plays as a defender for Russian club Torpedo Moscow.

== Career ==
He made his Montenegrin First League debut for Budućnost Podgorica on 14 March 2018 in a game against FK Dečić.

== Career statistics ==
As of 16 May 2026

Club	Season	League			Cup		Continental		Other		Total	
Club	Season	Division	Apps	Goals	Apps	Goals	Apps	Goals	Apps	Goals	Apps	Goals
Budućnost Podgorica	2017–18	Montenegrin First League	4	0	0	0	0	0	–		4	0
Budućnost Podgorica	2018–19	Montenegrin First League	13	0	0	0	2 (Note: Appearances in the UEFA Europa League)	0	–		15	0
Budućnost Podgorica	2019–20	Montenegrin First League	9	0	2	0	1	0	–		12	0
Budućnost Podgorica	Total		26	0	2	0	3	0	1	0	31	0
OFK Titograd	2019–20	Montenegrin First League	9	0	–		–		2 (Note: Appearances in relegation play-offs)	0	11	0
OFK Titograd	2020–21	Montenegrin First League	29	0	–		–		–		29	0
OFK Titograd	Total		38	0	0	0	0	0	2	0	40	0
Čukarički	2021–22	Serbian SuperLiga	26	1	1	0	4 (Note: Appearances in the UEFA Europa Conference League)	0	–		31	1
Čukarički	2022–23	Serbian SuperLiga	6	0	–		4	0	–		10	0
Čukarički	Total		32	1	1	0	8	0	0	0	41	1
Torpedo Moscow	2022–23	Russian Premier League	13	0	6	0	–		–		19	0
Torpedo Moscow	2023–24	Russian First League	9	0	0	0	–		–		9	0
Torpedo Moscow	2024–25	Russian First League	32	2	0	0	–		–		32	2
Torpedo Moscow	2025–26	Russian First League	27	0	2	0	–		–		29	0
Torpedo Moscow	Total		81	2	8	0	0	0	0	0	89	2
Career total			150	3	9	0	11	0	2	0	172	3
