= Kirill Bogdanets =

Russian footballer (born 2004)

Personal information
- Full name: Kirill Viktorovich Bogdanets
- Date of birth: 28 March 2004 (age 22)
- Height: 1.79 m (5 ft 10 in)
- Positions: Midfielder; forward

Team information
- Current team: Volna Nizhny Novgorod Oblast
- Number: 10

Youth career
- Krasnodar

Senior career*
Years	Team	Apps	(Gls)
2022–2024	Krasnodar-2	26	(4)
2022–2024	Krasnodar	0	(0)
2025–2026	Arsenal Tula	20	(0)
2025	Arsenal-2 Tula	2	(0)
2026–	Volna Nizhny Novgorod Oblast	14	(0)

International career^{‡}
2019–2020	Russia U16	6	(0)
2023	Russia U19	2	(1)
2023	Russia U21	1	(0)
- * Club domestic league appearances and goals as of 31 October 2026 ‡ National team caps and goals as of 15 November 2023

Kirill Viktorovich Bogdanets (Russian: Кирилл Викторович Богданец; born 28 March 2004) is a Russian footballer who plays as a forward for Volna Nizhny Novgorod Oblast.

== Club career ==
Bogdanets made his debut for Krasnodar on 27 November 2022 in a Russian Cup game against Khimki.

== Career statistics ==
As of 27 November 2022

Appearances and goals by club, season and competition
Club	Season	League			Cup		Continental		Total	
Club	Season	Division	Apps	Goals	Apps	Goals	Apps	Goals	Apps	Goals
Krasnodar-2	2022–23	First League	2	0	–		–		2	0
Krasnodar	2022–23	RPL	0	0	1	0	–		1	0
Career total			2	0	1	0	0	0	3	0
