= Yegor Proshkin =

Russian football player

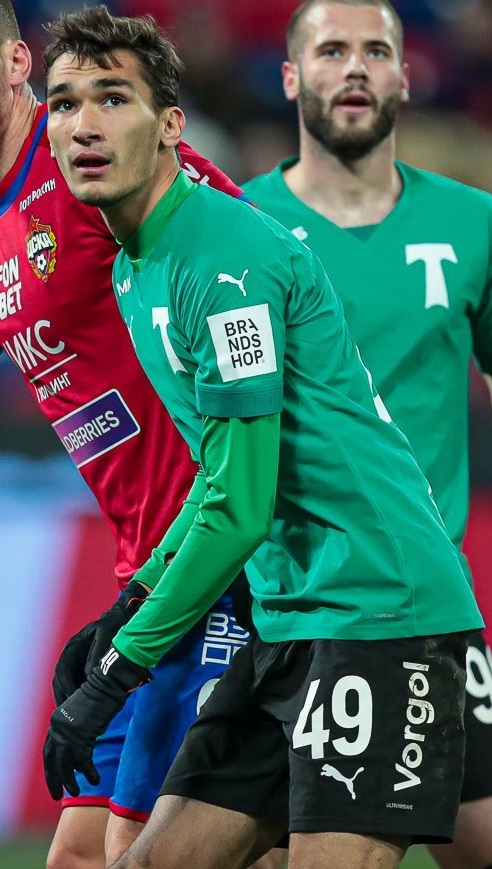
- Proshkin with Torpedo Moscow in 2022

Personal information
- Full name: Yegor Vadimovich Proshkin
- Date of birth: 15 January 1999 (age 27)
- Place of birth: Moscow, Russia
- Height: 1.87 m (6 ft 2 in)
- Position: Centre-back

Team information
- Current team: FC Volgar Astrakhan
- Number: 28

Youth career
- –2017: Master-Saturn Yegoryevsk
- 2018: FC Khimki

Senior career*
Years	Team	Apps	(Gls)
2018–2020	FC Khimki	0	(0)
2018–2020	→ FC Khimki-M	38	(5)
2020–2023	FC Torpedo Moscow	44	(1)
2023–	FC Volgar Astrakhan	78	(2)
- * Club domestic league appearances and goals as of 15 November 2026

Yegor Vadimovich Proshkin (Russian: Егор Вадимович Прошкин; born 15 January 1999) is a Russian football player who plays for FC Volgar Astrakhan.

== Club career ==
He made his debut in the Russian Professional Football League for FC Khimki-M on 10 August 2018 in a game against FC Metallurg Lipetsk.

He made his Russian Football National League debut for FC Torpedo Moscow on 2 August 2020 in a game against FC Shinnik Yaroslavl. He made his Russian Premier League debut for Torpedo on 21 August 2022 against FC Zenit Saint Petersburg.

== Honours ==
Torpedo Moscow

- Russian Football National League : 2021-22

== Career statistics ==
As of 27 November 2022

Club	Season	League			Cup		Continental		Other		Total	
Club	Season	Division	Apps	Goals	Apps	Goals	Apps	Goals	Apps	Goals	Apps	Goals
Khimki-M	2018–19	Second League	23	2	–		–		–		23	2
Khimki-M	2019–20	Second League	15	3	–		–		–		15	3
Khimki-M	Total		38	5	0	0	0	0	0	0	38	5
Khimki	2019–20	First League	0	0	0	0	–		1 (Note: Appearance in the FNL Cup)	0	1	0
Torpedo Moscow	2020–21	First League	18	1	1	0	–		–		19	1
Torpedo Moscow	2021–22	First League	14	0	2	0	–		–		16	0
Torpedo Moscow	2022–23	Premier League	7	0	2	0	–		–		9	0
Torpedo Moscow	Total		39	1	5	0	0	0	0	0	44	1
Career total			77	6	5	0	0	0	1	0	83	6
