= Artyom Abramov =

Russian football player

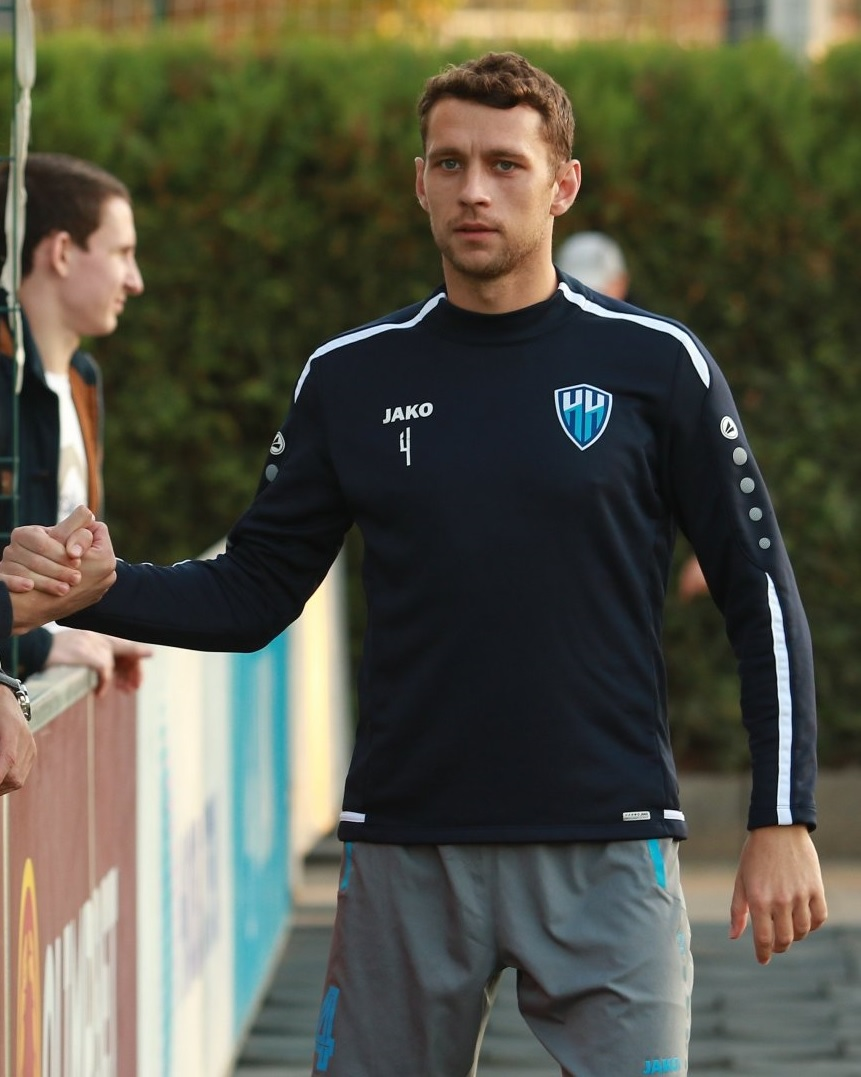
- Abramov with Nizhny Novgorod in 2019

Personal information
- Full name: Artyom Mikhaylovich Abramov
- Date of birth: 16 March 1991 (age 35)
- Place of birth: Nizhny Novgorod, Russian SFSR
- Height: 1.82 m (6 ft 0 in)
- Position: Defender

Team information
- Current team: Volna Nizhny Novgorod Oblast
- Number: 4

Youth career
- Spartak Moscow

Senior career*
Years	Team	Apps	(Gls)
2011	Volga Nizhny Novgorod	0	(0)
2011	Zvezda Ryazan	9	(0)
2012	Volga Ulyanovsk	8	(0)
2012	Shakhtyor Peshelan		
2013–2015	Volga Ulyanovsk	50	(1)
2015–2020	Nizhny Novgorod	106	(6)
2020–2021	Yenisey Krasnoyarsk	23	(0)
2021–2022	Tom Tomsk	29	(0)
2022–2025	KAMAZ Naberezhnye Chelny	73	(1)
2025–	Volna Nizhny Novgorod Oblast	45	(1)
- * Club domestic league appearances and goals as of 31 October 2026

Artyom Mikhaylovich Abramov (Russian: Артём Михайлович Абрамов; born 16 March 1991) is a Russian football player who plays as a defender for Volna Nizhny Novgorod Oblast.

== Club career ==
Abramov made his debut in the Russian Second Division for Zvezda Ryazan on 5 August 2011 in a game against Spartak Tambov.

He made his Russian Football National League debut for Olimpiyets Nizhny Novgorod on 8 July 2017 in a game against Avangard Kursk.
