= Dmitri Kratkov =

Russian footballer

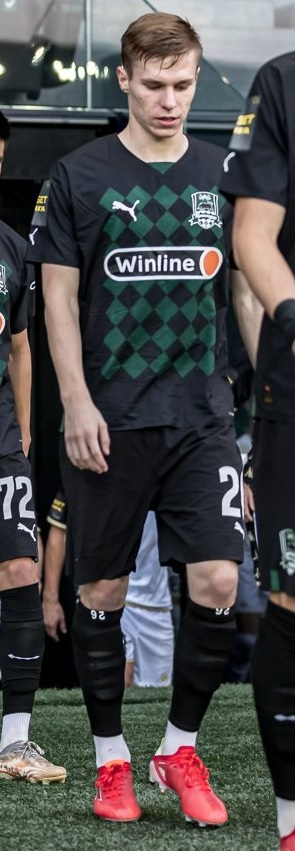
- Kratkov with Krasnodar-2 in 2022

Personal information
- Full name: Dmitri Viktorovich Kratkov
- Date of birth: 15 January 2002 (age 24)
- Place of birth: Krasnogvardeyskoye, Russia
- Height: 1.75 m (5 ft 9 in)
- Position: Midfielder

Team information
- Current team: PFC Dynamo Stavropol
- Number: 26

Youth career
- 2019–2021: FC Krasnodar

Senior career*
Years	Team	Apps	(Gls)
2019	FC Krasnodar-3	8	(0)
2021–2024	FC Krasnodar-2	48	(0)
2022	FC Krasnodar	2	(0)
2025	FC Surkhon	8	(0)
2025–2026	FC Saturn Ramenskoye	7	(1)
2026–	PFC Dynamo Stavropol	24	(2)

International career^{‡}
2017–2018	Russia U-16	18	(3)
2018–2019	Russia U-17	12	(3)
- * Club domestic league appearances and goals as of 17 October 2026 ‡ National team caps and goals as of 10 May 2019

Dmitri Viktorovich Kratkov (Russian: Дмитрий Викторович Кратков; born 15 January 2002) is a Russian football player who plays for PFC Dynamo Stavropol.

== Club career ==
He made his debut in the Russian Football National League for FC Krasnodar-2 on 17 July 2021 in a game against FC Alania Vladikavkaz.

Kratkov made his Russian Premier League debut for FC Krasnodar on 29 July 2022 against FC Ural Yekaterinburg.

== International career ==
He represented Russia at the 2019 UEFA European Under-17 Championship, where Russia lost all 3 games and was eliminated at group stage.

== Career statistics ==
As of 27 November 2022

Club	Season	League			Cup		Continental		Total	
Club	Season	Division	Apps	Goals	Apps	Goals	Apps	Goals	Apps	Goals
Krasnodar-3	2018–19	Second League	1	0	–		–		1	0
Krasnodar-3	2019–20	Second League	7	0	–		–		7	0
Krasnodar-3	Total		8	0	0	0	0	0	8	0
Krasnodar-2	2021–22	First League	12	0	–		–		12	0
Krasnodar-2	2022–23	First League	12	0	–		–		12	0
Krasnodar-2	Total		24	0	0	0	0	0	24	0
Krasnodar	2022–23	RPL	2	0	0	0	–		2	0
Career total			34	0	0	0	0	0	34	0
