= 2020–21 FC Spartak Moscow season =

Spartak Moscow
2020–21 season
- Chairman: Tomas Zorn
- Manager: Domenico Tedesco
- Stadium: Otkrytiye Arena
- Premier League: 2nd
- Russian Cup: Round of 16
- Top goalscorer: League: Jordan Larsson (15); All: Jordan Larsson (15); Aleksandr Sobolev (15)
- Highest home attendance: 12,393 vs Lokomotiv Moscow (23 August 2020)
- Lowest home attendance: 2,363 vs Rostov (31 October 2020)
- Average home league attendance: 9,333 (2 May 2021)
Home colours	Away colours

The 2020–21 Spartak Moscow season was the twenty-ninth successive season that the club played in the Russian Premier League, the highest tier of association football in Russia.

== Season events ==
On 25 July, Aleksandr Rudenko joined Sochi on a season-long loan deal.

On 2 August, Spartak announced the signing of Aleksandr Kokorin to a three-year contract, with the option of an additional year, after his Zenit St.Petersburg contract had expired.

On 5 August, Spartak announced the signing of Oston Urunov to a long-term contract from FC Ufa.

On 6 August, Artyom Timofeyev joined Akhmat Grozny on a season-long loan deal.

On 12 August, Aleksandr Lomovitsky joined Khimki on a season-long loan deal.

On 14 August, Georgi Melkadze joined Artyom Timofeyev on loan at Akhmat Grozny for the season.

On 3 September, Guus Til joined Bundesliga side SC Freiburg on a season-long loan with option to buy.

On 1 October, Aleksandr Lomovitsky was recalled from his loan at Khimki, and sent on loan for the season to Arsenal Tula, where he was joined by Nikolai Rasskazov in a similar deal. The following day, Reziuan Mirzov joined Khimki on loan for the season.

On 15 October, Spartak Moscow announced the signing of Victor Moses on loan from Chelsea for the remainder of the season, with an option to make the move permanent.

On 16 January, Spartak Moscow announced the signing of Jorrit Hendrix from PSV Eindhoven for the remainder of the season, with an option to make the move permanent.

== Squad ==
As of match played 16 May 2021

No.	Name	Nationality	Position	Date of birth (age)	Signed from	Signed in	Contract ends	Apps.	Goals
27	Timur Akmurzin	(Russia)	GK	7 December 1997 (aged 23)	Rubin Kazan	2019		0	0
30	Andrea Romagnoli	(Italy)	GK	29 July 1998 (aged 22)	Roma	2019		0	0
31	Anton Shitov	(Russia)	GK	29 January 2000 (aged 21)	Ararat Moscow	2018		0	0
32	Artyom Rebrov	(Russia)	GK	4 March 1984 (aged 37)	Shinnik Yaroslavl	2011		132	0
57	Aleksandr Selikhov	(Russia)	GK	7 April 1994 (aged 27)	Amkar Perm	2016		38	0
91	Daniil Markov	(Russia)	GK	1 January 2001 (aged 20)	Youth team	2018		0	0
98	Aleksandr Maksimenko	(Russia)	GK	23 February 1998 (aged 23)	Youth Team	2014		99	0
Defenders
2	Samuel Gigot	(France)	DF	12 October 1993 (aged 27)	Gent	2018	2022	72	8
6	Ayrton Lucas	(Brazil)	DF	19 June 1997 (aged 23)	Fluminense	2018		78	3
14	Georgi Dzhikiya	(Russia)	DF	21 November 1993 (aged 27)	Amkar Perm	2016		133	3
17	Georgi Tigiyev	(Russia)	DF	20 June 1995 (aged 25)	Anzhi Makhachkala	2017		7	0
29	Ilya Kutepov	(Russia)	DF	29 July 1993 (aged 27)	Akademiya Tolyatti	2012		109	2
35	Leonid Mironov	(Russia)	DF	14 September 1998 (aged 22)	Youth team	2015		1	0
36	Artyom Voropayev	(Russia)	DF	30 October 1999 (aged 21)	Lada-Tolyatti	2018	2019	0	0
38	Andrey Yeshchenko	(Russia)	DF	9 February 1984 (aged 37)	Anzhi Makhachkala	2016		109	1
39	Pavel Maslov	(Russia)	DF	14 April 2000 (aged 21)	Tyumen	2018	2024	39	0
56	Ilya Gaponov	(Russia)	DF	25 October 1997 (aged 23)	Strogino Moscow	2018		23	0
61	Ilya Golosov	(Russia)	DF	9 August 2001 (aged 19)	Lokomotiv Moscow	2019	2024	3	0
63	Daniil Petrunin	(Russia)	DF	10 June 1999 (aged 21)	Youth team	2015		1	0
93	Nikita Morgunov	(Russia)	DF	31 January 2001 (aged 20)	Youth team	2018		0	0
Midfielders
4	Jorrit Hendrix	(Netherlands)	MF	6 February 1995 (aged 26)	PSV Eindhoven	2021		11	0
8	Victor Moses	(Nigeria)	MF	12 December 1990 (aged 30)	loan from Chelsea	2020	2021	19	4
10	Zelimkhan Bakayev	(Russia)	MF	1 July 1996 (aged 24)	Youth team	2013		68	11
22	Mikhail Ignatov	(Russia)	MF	4 May 2000 (aged 21)	Youth team	2016		16	1
24	Quincy Promes	(Netherlands)	MF	4 January 1992 (aged 29)	Ajax	2021	2024	145	69
33	Alex Král	(Czech Republic)	MF	19 May 1998 (aged 22)	Slavia Prague	2019		53	0
47	Roman Zobnin	(Russia)	MF	11 February 1994 (aged 27)	Dynamo Moscow	2016		147	7
54	Nail Umyarov	(Russia)	MF	27 June 2000 (aged 20)	Chertanovo Moscow	2019		55	0
68	Ruslan Litvinov	(Russia)	MF	18 August 2001 (aged 19)	Youth team	2018		7	0
74	Dmitri Markitesov	(Russia)	MF	22 March 2001 (aged 20)	Youth team	2018		10	0
80	Nikita Bakalyuk	(Russia)	MF	3 April 2001 (aged 20)	Youth team	2018		1	0
84	Stepan Oganesyan	(Russia)	MF	28 September 2001 (aged 19)	Youth team	2019		2	0
87	Ayaz Guliyev	(Russia)	MF	27 November 1996 (aged 24)	Youth team	2012		26	1
90	Konstantin Shiltsov	(Russia)	MF	7 May 2002 (aged 19)	Youth team	2019		1	0
Forwards
7	Aleksandr Sobolev	(Russia)	FW	7 March 1997 (aged 24)	Krylia Sovetov	2020		37	18
11	Jordan Larsson	(Sweden)	FW	20 June 1997 (aged 23)	IFK Norrköping	2019		60	25
13	Nikoloz Kutateladze	(Georgia (country))	FW	19 March 2001 (aged 20)	Anzhi Makhachkala	2019		0	0
19	Ezequiel Ponce	(Argentina)	FW	29 March 1997 (aged 24)	Roma	2019		62	21
89	Ilya Golyatov	(Russia)	FW	6 April 2002 (aged 19)	Youth team	2019		0	0
99	Pedro Rocha	(Brazil)	FW	1 October 1994 (aged 26)	Grêmio	2017		19	1
Unregistered
88	Aleksandr Tashayev	(Russia)	MF	23 June 1994 (aged 26)	Dynamo Moscow	2018		28	0
Away on loan
8	Guus Til	(Netherlands)	MF	22 December 1997 (aged 23)	AZ Alkmaar	2019		24	2
15	Maksim Glushenkov	(Russia)	MF	28 July 1999 (aged 21)	Chertanovo Moscow	2019		11	0
20	Oston Urunov	(Uzbekistan)	MF	19 December 2000 (aged 20)	Ufa	2020		9	1
23	Aleksandr Lomovitsky	(Russia)	MF	27 January 1998 (aged 23)	Youth team	2015		25	0
37	Georgi Melkadze	(Russia)	MF	4 April 1997 (aged 24)	Youth team	2014		22	0
40	Artyom Timofeyev	(Russia)	MF	12 January 1994 (aged 27)	Your team	2012		32	0
77	Reziuan Mirzov	(Russia)	FW	22 June 1993 (aged 27)	Rostov	2019		27	1
79	Aleksandr Rudenko	(Russia)	FW	15 March 1999 (aged 22)	Youth team	2015		0	0
92	Nikolai Rasskazov	(Russia)	DF	4 January 1998 (aged 23)	Youth team	2015		50	2
Players that left Spartak Moscow during the season
9	Aleksandr Kokorin	(Russia)	FW	19 March 1991 (aged 30)	Zenit St.Petersburg	2020	2023 (+1)	10	2
21	Malcolm Badu	(Germany)	DF	23 June 1997 (aged 23)	VfL Wolfsburg II	2019		0	0
42	Vladislav Vasilyev	(Russia)	MF	27 July 1999 (aged 21)	Dnepr Smolensk	2019		19	0
66	Sylvanus Nimely	(Liberia)	FW	4 April 1998 (aged 23)	MFK Karviná	2016		1	0
67	Maksim Sazonov	(Russia)	DF	2 April 2000 (aged 21)	Youth team	2017		0	0
70	Ivan Repyakh	(Russia)	MF	18 October 2001 (aged 19)	Youth team	2018		0	0
78	Maksim Danilin	(Russia)	MF	13 September 2001 (aged 19)	Youth team	2018		0	0
87	Svyatoslav Kozhedub	(Russia)	MF	22 May 2002 (aged 18)	Youth team	2019		1	0

=== Out on loan ===
Note: Flags indicate national team as defined under FIFA eligibility rules; some limited exceptions apply. Players may hold more than one non-FIFA nationality.

No.	Pos.	Nation	Player
8	MF	NED	Guus Til (at SC Freiburg until end of 2020–21 season)
15	MF	RUS	Maksim Glushenkov (at Khimki until end of 2020–21 season)
20	MF	UZB	Oston Urunov (at Ufa until end of 2020–21 season)
23	MF	RUS	Aleksandr Lomovitsky (at Arsenal Tula until end of 2020–21 season)
37	MF	RUS	Georgi Melkadze (at Akhmat Grozny until end of 2020–21 season)

No.	Pos.	Nation	Player
40	MF	RUS	Artyom Timofeyev (at Akhmat Grozny until end of 2020–21 season)
77	FW	RUS	Reziuan Mirzov (at Khimki until end of 2020–21 season)
79	FW	RUS	Aleksandr Rudenko (at Sochi until end of 2020–21 season)
92	DF	RUS	Nikolai Rasskazov (at Arsenal Tula until end of 2020–21 season)

== Transfers ==
=== In ===
Date	Position	Nationality	Name	From	Fee	Ref.
2 August 2020	FW	(Russia)	Aleksandr Kokorin	Zenit St.Petersburg	Free	
5 August 2020	MF	(Uzbekistan)	Oston Urunov	Ufa	Undisclosed	
16 January 2021	MF	(Netherlands)	Jorrit Hendrix	PSV Eindhoven	Undisclosed	
24 February 2021	MF	(Netherlands)	Quincy Promes	Ajax	Undisclosed	

=== Loans in ===
Date from	Position	Nationality	Name	From	Date to	Ref.
15 October 2020	MF	(Nigeria)	Victor Moses	Chelsea	End of season	

=== Out ===
Date	Position	Nationality	Name	To	Fee	Ref.
21 January 2021	FW	(Russia)	Aleksandr Kokorin	Fiorentina	Undisclosed	
26 January 2021	FW	(Liberia)	Sylvanus Nimely	Gorica	Undisclosed	
4 February 2021	MF	(Russia)	Vladislav Vasilyev	Van	Undisclosed	

=== Loans out ===
Date from	Position	Nationality	Name	To	Date to	Ref.
24 December 2019	FW	(Brazil)	Pedro Rocha	Flamengo	31 December 2020	
25 July 2020	FW	(Russia)	Aleksandr Rudenko	Sochi	End of season	
6 August 2020	MF	(Russia)	Artyom Timofeyev	Akhmat Grozny	End of season	
12 August 2020	MF	(Russia)	Aleksandr Lomovitsky	Khimki	1 October 2020	
14 August 2020	MF	(Russia)	Georgi Melkadze	Akhmat Grozny	End of season	
3 September 2020	MF	(Netherlands)	Guus Til	SC Freiburg	End of season	
1 October 2020	DF	(Russia)	Nikolai Rasskazov	Arsenal Tula	End of season	
1 October 2020	MF	(Russia)	Aleksandr Lomovitsky	Arsenal Tula	End of season	
2 October 2020	FW	(Russia)	Reziuan Mirzov	Khimki	End of season	
2 February 2021	MF	(Russia)	Maksim Glushenkov	Khimki	End of season	
20 February 2021	MF	(Uzbekistan)	Oston Urunov	Ufa	End of season	

=== Released ===
Date	Position	Nationality	Name	Joined	Date	Ref.
31 December 2020	MF	(Russia)	Maksim Danilin			
31 December 2020	MF	(Russia)	Svyatoslav Kozhedub			
31 December 2020	DF	(Russia)	Maksim Sazonov	Metallurg Lipetsk		
14 January 2021	DF	(Germany)	Malcolm Badu			

== Friendlies ==
30 January 2021	Pakhtakor Tashkent (Uzbekistan)	1 – 2	(Russia) Spartak Moscow	Dubai, United Arab Emirates
15:00 MSK (UTC+3)	Ćeran 7' (pen.)	Report	Král 30'; Zobnin 87'	Stadium: Jebel Ali Stadium

== Competitions ==
=== Premier League ===
==== League table ====
Pos	Team	Pld	W	D	L	GF	GA	GD	Pts	Qualification or relegation
1	Zenit Saint Petersburg (C)	30	19	8	3	76	26	+50	65	Qualification for the Champions League group stage
2	Spartak Moscow	30	17	6	7	56	37	+19	57	Qualification for the Champions League third qualifying round
3	Lokomotiv Moscow	30	17	5	8	45	35	+10	56	Qualification for the Europa League group stage (Note: FC Lokomotiv Moscow qualified for the Europa League group stage by winning the 2020–21 Russian Cup. The Europa Conference League spot awarded to the third-placed team is passed to fourth-placed team, and the spot awarded to the fourth-placed team is passed to fifth-placed team.)
4	Rubin Kazan	30	16	5	9	42	33	+9	53 (Note: Head-to-head points: Rubin 3, Sochi 3. Overall matches won: Rubin 16, Sochi 15.)	Qualification for the Europa Conference League third qualifying round
5	Sochi	30	15	8	7	49	33	+16	53	Qualification for the Europa Conference League second qualifying round

Source: Premier Liga
Rules for classification: 1) Points; 2) Head-to-head points; 3) Head-to-head matches won; 4) Head-to-head goal difference; 5) Head-to-head goals scored; 6) Matches won; 7) Goal difference; 8) Goals scored; 9) Play-off.
(C) Champions

==== Results summary ====
Overall								Home						Away					
Pld	W	D	L	GF	GA	GD	Pts	W	D	L	GF	GA	GD	W	D	L	GF	GA	GD
30	17	6	7	57	37	+20	57	9	3	3	32	16	+16	8	3	4	25	21	+4

Last updated: 16 May 2021.
Source: See Results

==== Results by round ====
Round	1	2	3	4	5	6	7	8	9	10	11	12	13	14	15	16	17	18	19	20	21	22	23	24	25	26	27	28	29	30
Ground	H	H	A	H	A	H	A	A	A	H	A	A	H	A	H	H	H	A	A	H	H	A	H	A	A	H	H	A	H	A
Result	D	W	D	W	W	W	L	W	W	D	W	W	L	D	D	W	W	L	L	L	W	W	W	W	L	L	W	W	W	D
Position	7	4	6	2	2	1	3	2	2	2	2	1	3	3	3	3	2	2	3	4	3	2	2	2	2	3	3	2	2	2

Updated to match(es) played on 16 May 2021. Source: Premier Liga
A = Away; H = Home; W = Win; D = Draw; L = Loss

==== Results ====
9 August 2020 1	Spartak Moscow	2 – 2	Sochi	Moscow
20:00 MSK (UTC+3)	Sobolev 8' (yellow card) 8'; Larsson 10' (yellow card) 74'; Král (yellow card) 84'; Maksimenko (yellow card) 90'	Report	Poloz 15' (pen.); Terkhov (yellow card) 40'; Margasov (yellow card) 82'; Noboa 90' (pen.)	Stadium: Otkritie Arena; Attendance: 9,738; Referee: Vasili Kazartsev

14 August 2020 2	Spartak Moscow	2 – 0	Akhmat Grozny	Moscow
20:00 MSK (UTC+3)	Král (yellow card) 40'; Larsson 52' (pen.); Ponce 69'; Zobnin (yellow card) 86'	Report	Berisha (yellow card) 2'; Shvets (yellow card) 26'; Kharin (yellow card) 38'; Ismael (yellow card) 40'; Semyonov (yellow card) 50'; Nenakhov (yellow card) 68' (yellow-red card) 77'; Bogosavac (yellow card) 72'; Roshi (yellow card) 90+'	Stadium: Otkritie Arena; Attendance: 8,946; Referee: Evgeny Turbin

19 August 2020 3	Ufa	1 – 1	Spartak Moscow	Ufa
16:00 MSK (UTC+3)	Alikin 2' (yellow card) 27'; Zhamaletdinov (yellow card) 78'; Folmer (yellow card) 80'	Report	Larsson (penalty missed) 12'; Ponce 18'	Stadium: Neftyanik Stadium; Attendance: 3,407; Referee: Stanislav Vasiliev

23 August 2020 4	Spartak Moscow	2 – 1	Lokomotiv Moscow	Moscow
19:00 MSK (UTC+3)	Larsson 53'; Sobolev 81'; Umyarov (yellow card) 86'	Report	Barinov (yellow card) 7'; Cerqueira 10'; Rybus (yellow card) 42'; Krychowiak (yellow card) 44'; Ćorluka (yellow card) 69'; Rybchinsky (yellow card) 80'; Guilherme (yellow card) 90+4'	Stadium: Otkritie Arena; Attendance: 12,393; Referee: Sergei Karasev

26 August 2020 5	Rotor Volgograd	0 – 1	Spartak Moscow	Volgograd
18:30 MSK (UTC+3)	Makarov (yellow card) 28'; Kvirkvelia (yellow card) 53'; Bairyyev (yellow card) 66'; Gogoua (yellow card) 71'; Kozhemyakin (yellow card) 90+'	Report	Bakayev (yellow card) 5' (goal) 55' (pen.); Zobnin (yellow card) 65'; Yeshchenko (yellow card) 90+'; Sobolev (yellow card) 90+'; Maksimenko (yellow card) 90+'; Maslov (yellow card) 90+'	Stadium: Volgograd Arena; Attendance: 18,139; Referee: Alexey Sukhoi

29 August 2020 6	Spartak Moscow	2 – 1	Arsenal Tula	Moscow
18:00 MSK (UTC+3)	Sobolev 41'; Gigot 45+' (yellow card) 71'	Report	Lesovoy (yellow card) 13' (yellow-red card) 45'; Sokol (yellow card) 30'; Khlusevich 36'; Panteleyev (yellow card) 42'; Čaušić (yellow card) 90'	Stadium: Otkritie Arena; Attendance: 9,186; Referee: Aleksei Matyunin

13 September 2020 7	CSKA Moscow	3 – 1	Spartak Moscow	Moscow
19:00 MSK (UTC+3)	Karpov (yellow card) 1'; Magnússon 30' (yellow card) 90+'; Vlašić 45+'; Ejuke 90+'; Shchennikov (yellow card) FT	Report	Ponce 11'; Maslov (yellow card) 29'; Ayrton (yellow card) 34'; Sobolev (yellow card) 58'; Urunov (yellow card) 90'	Stadium: VEB Arena; Attendance: 13,330; Referee: Sergei Karasev

20 September 2020 8	Rubin Kazan	0 – 2	Spartak Moscow	Kazan
16:30 MSK (UTC+3)	Kvaratskhelia (yellow card) 24'; Abildgaard (yellow card) 29'; Merkulov (yellow card) 47'; Uremović (yellow card) 90'; Makarov (yellow card) 90+'; Jevtić (yellow card) 90+'	Report	Larsson 5'; Merkulov 21' (o.g.); Maslov (yellow card) 39' (yellow-red card) 61'; Maksimenko (yellow card) 61'; Urunov (yellow card) 81'	Stadium: Ak Bars Arena; Attendance: 18,465; Referee: Kirill Levnikov

26 September 2020 9	Tambov	0 – 2	Spartak Moscow	Saransk
14:00 MSK (UTC+3)	Balashov (yellow card) 40'; Ciupercă (yellow card) 57'; Chagrov (yellow card) 82'; Kapliyenko (yellow card) 90'	Report	Kutepov (yellow card) 10'; Ponce (yellow card) 55'; Ayrton 75', 84'; Zobnin (yellow card) 87'	Stadium: Mordovia Arena; Attendance: 14,977; Referee: Igor Panin
Note: Match played at the Mordovia Arena in Saransk instead of Tambov's regular Spartak Stadium.

3 October 2020 10	Spartak Moscow	1 – 1	Zenit St.Petersburg	Moscow
19:00 MSK (UTC+3)	Sobolev (yellow card) 59'; Ponce 86'; Yeshchenko (yellow card) 90'	Report	Douglas (yellow card) 37'; Yerokhin 65'; Barrios (yellow card) 88'; Lovren (yellow card) 89'	Stadium: Otkritie Arena; Attendance: 17,150; Referee: Pavel Kukuyan

17 October 2020 11	Khimki	2 – 3	Spartak Moscow	Khimki
19:00 MSK (UTC+3)	Troshechkin (yellow card) 5'; Mirzov (yellow card) 40' (goal) 48'; Kukharchuk (yellow card) 52'; Logashov (yellow card) 57'; Idowu 85'; Glushakov (yellow card) 88'; Danilkin (yellow card) 90+'	Report	Ponce (yellow card) 29' (goal) 63'; Maslov (yellow card) 31'; Kokorin 57' (pen.) (yellow card) 70'; Larsson 77'	Stadium: Arena Khimki; Attendance: 3,881; Referee: Kirill Levnikov

24 October 2020 12	Krasnodar	1 – 3	Spartak Moscow	Krasnodar
19:00 MSK (UTC+3)	Vilhena (yellow card) 52'; Sabua 59'; Martynovich (yellow card) 63' (yellow-red card) 90+'; Smolnikov (yellow card) 74'	Report	Ponce 13'; Moses 33'; Dzhikiya (yellow card) 48'; Maslov (yellow card) 64'; Larsson 82'; Umyarov (yellow card) 83'	Stadium: Krasnodar Stadium; Attendance: 10,554; Referee: Vladislav Bezborodov

31 October 2020 13	Spartak Moscow	0 – 1	Rostov	Moscow
16:30 MSK (UTC+3)	Larsson (yellow card) 41'; Kutepov (yellow card) 55'; Sobolev (yellow card) 58'; Ayrton (yellow card) 90'	Report	Mamayev 26'; Hadžikadunić (yellow card) 42' (yellow-red card) 75'; Kozlov (yellow card) 60'; Poyarkov (yellow card) 61'; Gigović (yellow card) 72'; Terentyev (yellow card) 88'; Glebov (yellow card) 89'	Stadium: Otkritie Arena; Attendance: 2,363; Referee: Vitaly Meshkov

7 November 2020 14	Ural Yekaterinburg	2 – 2	Spartak Moscow	Yekaterinburg
14:00 MSK (UTC+3)	Pogrebnyak 11'; El Kabir (yellow card) 44'; Rykov (yellow card) 45'; Zolotov (yellow card) 53'; Augustyniak 60'	Report	Sobolev 6', 45+' (pen.); Moses (yellow card) 34'; Ayrton (yellow card) 86'; Gigot (yellow card) 89'	Stadium: Central Stadium; Attendance: 9,669; Referee: Pavel Kukuyan

21 November 2020 15	Spartak Moscow	1 – 1	Dynamo Moscow	Moscow
19:00 MSK (UTC+3)	Ayrton (yellow card) 81'; Maslov (yellow card) 83'; Zobnin 85'	Report	Grulyov (yellow card) 76'; Neustädter (yellow card) 78'; Skopintsev 79'	Stadium: Otkritie Arena; Attendance: 4,953; Referee: Sergey Ivanov

29 November 2020 16	Spartak Moscow	2 – 0	Rotor Volgograd	Moscow
19:00 MSK (UTC+3)	Kokorin 15' (pen.); Larsson (yellow card) 60'; Yeshchenko (yellow card) 86'; Gigot (yellow card) 90+'; Zobnin (yellow card) 90+2'	Report	Davitashvili (yellow card) 13'	Stadium: Otkritie Arena; Attendance: 6,429; Referee: Nikolay Voloshin

5 December 2020 17	Spartak Moscow	5 – 1	Tambov	Moscow
16:30 MSK (UTC+3)	Larsson 27', 83'; Ponce 63', 90+'; Gigot 87'	Report	Onugkha 65'; Chicherin (yellow card) 83'	Stadium: Otkritie Arena; Attendance: Stanislav Vasiliev; Referee: 5,964

12 December 2020 18	Sochi	1 – 0	Spartak Moscow	Sochi
16:30 MSK (UTC+3)	Mammana (yellow card) 9'; Terekhov (yellow card) 26'; Dugandžić (yellow card) 50'; Noboa 57'; A.Zabolotny (yellow card) 65'; Zaika (yellow card) 83'	Report	Král (yellow card) 32'; Umyarov (yellow card) 81'; Ayrton (yellow card) 90+'	Stadium: Fisht Olympic Stadium; Attendance: 10,747; Referee: Igor Panin

16 December 2020 19	Zenit St.Petersburg	3 – 1	Spartak Moscow	Saint Petersburg
20:00 MSK (UTC+3)	Azmoun 8'; Malcom (yellow card) 39'; Rakitskiy 74'; Sutormin (yellow card) 78'; Barrios (yellow card) 83'; Dzyuba 90+'	Report	Zobnin (yellow card) 25'; Larsson (yellow card) 36'; Dzhikiya (yellow card) 54'; Lovren 67' (o.g.)	Stadium: Krestovsky Stadium; Attendance: 1,993; Referee: Sergei Karasev

28 February 2021 20	Spartak Moscow	0 – 2	Rubin Kazan	Moscow
14:00 MSK (UTC+3)	Gigot (yellow card) 12'; Moses (yellow card) 20'; Zobnin (yellow card) 37' (yellow-red card) 45+3'; Sobolev (yellow card) 75'; Dzhikiya (yellow card) 87'	Report	Shatov (yellow card) 7'; Begić (yellow card) 26'; Despotović 53', 89'; Abildgaard (yellow card) 62' (yellow-red card) 71'	Stadium: Otkritie Arena; Attendance: 9,834; Referee: Sergey Lapochkin

7 March 2021 21	Spartak Moscow	6 – 1	Krasnodar	Moscow
19:00 MSK (UTC+3)	Sobolev 1', 61'; Promes 8'; Larsson 63', 83'; Gigot (yellow card) 67'; Ponce 75'; Umyarov (yellow card) 88'	Report	Gazinsky 56'; Sorokin (yellow card) 87'	Stadium: Otkritie Arena; Attendance: 10,261; Referee: Vitali Meshkov

13 March 2021 22	Dynamo Moscow	1 – 2	Spartak Moscow	Moscow
16:30 MSK (UTC+3)	Maslov 18' (pen.); Parshivlyuk (yellow card) 41'; Skopintsev (yellow card) 89'	Report	Moses 30'; Ayrton (yellow card) 53'; Promes (yellow card) 61'; Sobolev 63' (pen.) (yellow card) 90+'; Kutepov (yellow card) 80'	Stadium: VTB Arena; Attendance: 12,567; Referee: Sergey Ivanov

18 March 2021 23	Spartak Moscow	5 – 1	Ural Yekaterinburg	Moscow
19:00 MSK (UTC+3)	Larsson 12', 47' (yellow card) 84'; Promes 26'; Sobolev 45+' (pen.), 90+' (pen.); Gigot (yellow card) 74'; Kutepov (yellow card) 76'; Ayrton (yellow card) 86'	Report	Bicfalvi 55' (pen.); Gerasimov (yellow card) 56'; Konovalov (yellow card) 84'; Strandberg (yellow card) 90+'	Stadium: Otkritie Arena; Attendance: 10,170; Referee: Vladimir Moskalyov

4 April 2021 24	Rostov	2 – 3	Spartak Moscow	Rostov-on-Don
19:00 MSK (UTC+3)	Maslov 27' (o.g.); Makhatadze 32'; Sowe (yellow card) 52'	Report	Promes (yellow card) 15'; Moses 23'; Sobolev 44', 58'; Zobnin (yellow card) 62'; Hendrix (yellow card) 90'	Stadium: Rostov Arena; Attendance: 32,888; Referee: Pavel Kukuyan

11 April 2021 25	Lokomotiv Moscow	2 – 0	Spartak Moscow	Moscow
19:00 MSK (UTC+3)	Kamano 22' (yellow card) 76'; Smolov 45+'; Barinov (yellow card) 55'; Mukhin (yellow card) 58'; Guilherme (yellow card) 74'; Zhemaletdinov (yellow card) 84'; Zhivoglyadov (yellow card) 85'	Report	Sobolev (yellow card) 23'; Ayrton (red card) 45'; Dzhikiya (yellow card) 76'; Maslov (yellow card) 85'	Stadium: RZD Arena; Attendance: 11,902; Referee: Kirill Levnikov

18 April 2021 26	Spartak Moscow	0 – 3	Ufa	Moscow
19:00 MSK (UTC+3)	Promes (yellow card) 7'; Ponce (yellow card) 11'; Gigot (yellow card) 28' (yellow-red card) 79'; Kutepov (yellow card) 86'	Report	Tabidze (yellow card) 27'; Kamilov 45', 87' (penalty missed) 87'; Mrzljak 48'; Bizoza (yellow card) 88'	Stadium: Otkritie Arena; Attendance: 10,980; Referee: Vitali Meshkov

25 April 2021 27	Spartak Moscow	1 – 0	CSKA Moscow	Moscow
16:30 MSK (UTC+3)	Larsson 52'; Ayrton (yellow card) 62'; Maksimenko (yellow card) 88'; Moses (yellow card) 90+'; Umyarov (yellow card) 90+'	Report	Akhmetov (red card) 37'; Dzagoev (yellow card) 53'; Maradishvili (yellow card) 64'	Stadium: Otkritie Arena; Attendance: 11,974; Referee: Pavel Kukuyan

3 May 2021 28	Arsenal Tula	1 – 2	Spartak Moscow	Tula
16:30 MSK (UTC+3)	Đorđević (yellow card) 38'; Čaušić (yellow card) 40'; Kutepov 45' (o.g.); Kavalyow (yellow card) 60'; Tkachyov (yellow card) 90'	Report	Sobolev 21' (yellow card) 29'; Larsson 76'	Stadium: Arsenal Stadium; Attendance: 9,432; Referee: Sergey Ivanov

10 May 2021 29	Spartak Moscow	2 – 1	Khimki	Moscow
19:00 MSK (UTC+3)	Kutepov (yellow card) 2'; Ponce (yellow card) 39'; Dzhikiya (yellow card) 45+2'; Sobolev 54'; Larsson 89' (yellow card) 90+2'	Report	Glushenkov (yellow card) 6' (red card) 37' (goal) 27'; Sebai (yellow card) 14'; Danilkin (yellow card) 23'; Bozhenov (yellow card) 41'; Lantratov (yellow card) 74'	Stadium: Otkritie Arena; Attendance: 9,649; Referee: Vladislav Bezborodov

16 May 2021 30	Akhmat Grozny	2 – 2	Spartak Moscow	Grozny
14:00 MSK (UTC+3)	Nenakhov (yellow card) 8'; Ilyin 20', 31'; Bystrov (yellow card) 43'; Berisha (yellow card) 74'	Report	Promes 54'; Dzhikiya (yellow card) 67'; Moses 83'; Zobnin (yellow card) 87'; Sobolev (yellow card) 90+'	Stadium: Akhmat-Arena; Attendance: 11,086; Referee: Pavel Kukuyan

=== Russian Cup ===
==== Round of 32 ====
Pos	Team	Pld	W	D	L	GF	GA	GD	Pts	Qualification
1	Spartak Moscow	2	1	0	1	5	2	+3	3	Advance to Play-off
2	Rodina Moscow	2	1	0	1	4	5	−1	3	
3	Yenisey Krasnoyarsk	2	1	0	1	1	3	−2	3	

16 September 2020 1	Rodina Moscow	1 – 5	Spartak Moscow	Moscow
19:00 MSK (UTC+3)	G.Yudintsev (yellow card) 50'; M.Abdusalamov 61'	Report	Sobolev 35'; Urunov 53'; Ayrton 56'; Zobnin 59'; Ponce 80'	Stadium: Otkritie Arena; Referee: Anton Frolov
Note: Match played at the Otkritie Arena in Moscow, instead of Rodina Moscow's regular Yantar Stadium in Moscow.

21 October 2020 2	Yenisey Krasnoyarsk	1 – 0	Spartak Moscow	Krasnoyarsk
15:00 MSK (UTC+3)	Sanaya (yellow card) 46'; Lescano 47'; Komkov (yellow card) 56'; Tskhovrebov (yellow card) 67'	Report	Kutepov (yellow card) 7'; Markitesov (yellow card) 69'	Stadium: Central Stadium; Referee: Roman Galimov

==== Round of 16 ====
20 February 2021 Round of 16	Dynamo Moscow	2 – 0	Spartak Moscow	Moscow
19:30 MSK (UTC+3)	Fomin 16' (pen.) (yellow card) 74'; Szymański (yellow card) 56'; Tyukavin 70'; Kaboré (yellow card) 90+3'	Report	Moses (yellow card) 15' (yellow-red card) 81'; Larsson (yellow card) 26'; Ponce (yellow card) 69'	Stadium: VTB Arena; Attendance: 11,322; Referee: Kirill Levnikov

== Squad statistics ==
As of match played 16 May 2021

=== Appearances and goals ===
No.	Pos	Nat	Player	Total		Premier League		Russian Cup	
No.	Pos	Nat	Player	Apps	Goals	Apps	Goals	Apps	Goals
2	DF	(France) FRA	Samuel Gigot	27	3	26	3	1	0
4	MF	(Netherlands) NED	Jorrit Hendrix	11	0	1+9	0	1	0
6	DF	(Brazil) BRA	Ayrton Lucas	29	3	27	2	2	1
7	FW	(Russia) RUS	Aleksandr Sobolev	24	15	16+6	14	1+1	1
8	MF	(Nigeria) NGR	Victor Moses	20	4	18+1	4	1	0
10	MF	(Russia) RUS	Zelimkhan Bakayev	26	1	13+10	1	2+1	0
11	FW	(Sweden) SWE	Jordan Larsson	30	15	29	15	1	0
14	DF	(Russia) RUS	Georgi Dzhikiya	30	0	27+1	0	2	0
19	FW	(Argentina) ARG	Ezequiel Ponce	28	10	18+7	9	2+1	1
22	MF	(Russia) RUS	Mikhail Ignatov	3	0	0+2	0	0+1	0
24	MF	(Netherlands) NED	Quincy Promes	11	3	10+1	3	0	0
29	DF	(Russia) RUS	Ilya Kutepov	18	0	10+6	0	2	0
32	GK	(Russia) RUS	Artyom Rebrov	1	0	0	0	1	0
33	MF	(Czech Republic) CZE	Alex Král	30	0	28+1	0	1	0
35	DF	(Russia) RUS	Leonid Mironov	1	0	0	0	1	0
38	DF	(Russia) RUS	Andrey Yeshchenko	15	0	0+15	0	0	0
39	DF	(Russia) RUS	Pavel Maslov	28	0	24+1	0	3	0
47	MF	(Russia) RUS	Roman Zobnin	30	2	28	1	2	1
54	MF	(Russia) RUS	Nail Umyarov	29	0	16+10	0	2+1	0
56	DF	(Russia) RUS	Ilya Gaponov	13	0	3+8	0	1+1	0
57	GK	(Russia) RUS	Aleksandr Selikhov	1	0	1	0	0	0
61	DF	(Russia) RUS	Ilya Golosov	1	0	0	0	0+1	0
63	DF	(Russia) RUS	Daniil Petrunin	1	0	0	0	0+1	0
68	MF	(Russia) RUS	Ruslan Litvinov	7	0	0+6	0	0+1	0
74	MF	(Russia) RUS	Dmitri Markitesov	8	0	0+6	0	1+1	0
84	MF	(Russia) RUS	Stepan Oganesyan	2	0	0+1	0	1	0
90	MF	(Russia) RUS	Konstantin Shiltsov	1	0	0	0	0+1	0
98	GK	(Russia) RUS	Aleksandr Maksimenko	31	0	29	0	2	0
Players away from the club on loan:
8	MF	(Netherlands) NED	Guus Til	3	0	0+3	0	0	0
15	MF	(Russia) RUS	Maksim Glushenkov	5	0	1+4	0	0	0
20	MF	(Uzbekistan) UZB	Oston Urunov	9	1	1+7	0	1	1
77	FW	(Russia) RUS	Reziuan Mirzov	1	0	0+1	0	0	0
Players who left Spartak Moscow during the season:
9	FW	(Russia) RUS	Aleksandr Kokorin	10	2	4+4	2	2	0
87	MF	(Russia) RUS	Svyatoslav Kozhedub	1	0	0	0	0+1	0

=== Goal scorers ===
Place	Position	Nation	Number	Name	Premier League	Russian Cup	Total
1	FW	(Sweden)	11	Jordan Larsson	15	0	15
1	FW	(Russia)	7	Aleksandr Sobolev	14	1	15
3	FW	(Argentina)	19	Ezequiel Ponce	9	1	10
4	MF	(Nigeria)	8	Victor Moses	4	0	4
5	DF	(France)	2	Samuel Gigot	3	0	3
5	MF	(Netherlands)	24	Quincy Promes	3	0	3
5	DF	(Brazil)	6	Ayrton Lucas	2	1	3
8	FW	(Russia)	9	Aleksandr Kokorin	2	0	2
8	MF	(Russia)	47	Roman Zobnin	1	1	2
8				Own goal	1	1	2
11	MF	(Russia)	10	Zelimkhan Bakayev	1	0	1
11	MF	(Uzbekistan)	20	Oston Urunov	0	1	1
				TOTALS	56	5	61

=== Clean sheets ===
Place	Position	Nation	Number	Name	Premier League	Russian Cup	Total
1	GK	(Russia)	98	Aleksandr Maksimenko	6	0	6
				TOTALS	6	0	6

=== Disciplinary record ===
Number	Nation	Position	Name	Premier League		Russian Cup		Total	
Number	Nation	Position	Name	Booked	Sent off (straight red)	Booked	Sent off (straight red)	Booked	Sent off (straight red)
2	(France)	DF	Samuel Gigot	7	1	0	0	7	1
4	(Netherlands)	MF	Jorrit Hendrix	1	0	0	0	1	0
6	(Brazil)	DF	Ayrton Lucas	8	1	0	0	8	1
7	(Russia)	FW	Aleksandr Sobolev	10	0	0	0	10	0
8	(Nigeria)	MF	Victor Moses	3	0	2	1	5	1
10	(Russia)	MF	Zelimkhan Bakayev	1	0	0	0	1	0
11	(Sweden)	FW	Jordan Larsson	6	0	1	0	7	0
14	(Russia)	DF	Georgi Dzhikiya	6	0	0	0	6	0
19	(Argentina)	FW	Ezequiel Ponce	4	0	1	0	5	0
24	(Netherlands)	MF	Quincy Promes	3	0	0	0	3	0
29	(Russia)	DF	Ilya Kutepov	6	0	1	0	7	0
33	(Czech Republic)	MF	Alex Král	3	0	0	0	3	0
38	(Russia)	DF	Andrey Yeshchenko	3	0	0	0	3	0
39	(Russia)	DF	Pavel Maslov	8	1	0	0	8	1
47	(Russia)	MF	Roman Zobnin	9	1	0	0	9	1
54	(Russia)	MF	Nail Umyarov	5	0	0	0	5	0
74	(Russia)	MF	Dmitri Markitesov	0	0	1	0	1	0
98	(Russia)	GK	Aleksandr Maksimenko	4	0	0	0	4	0
Players out on loan:
20	(Uzbekistan)	MF	Oston Urunov	2	0	0	0	2	0
Players who left Spartak Moscow during the season:
9	(Russia)	FW	Aleksandr Kokorin	1	0	0	0	1	0
			TOTALS	90	4	6	1	96	5
