= 2019–20 FC Spartak Moscow season =

Spartak Moscow
2019–20 season
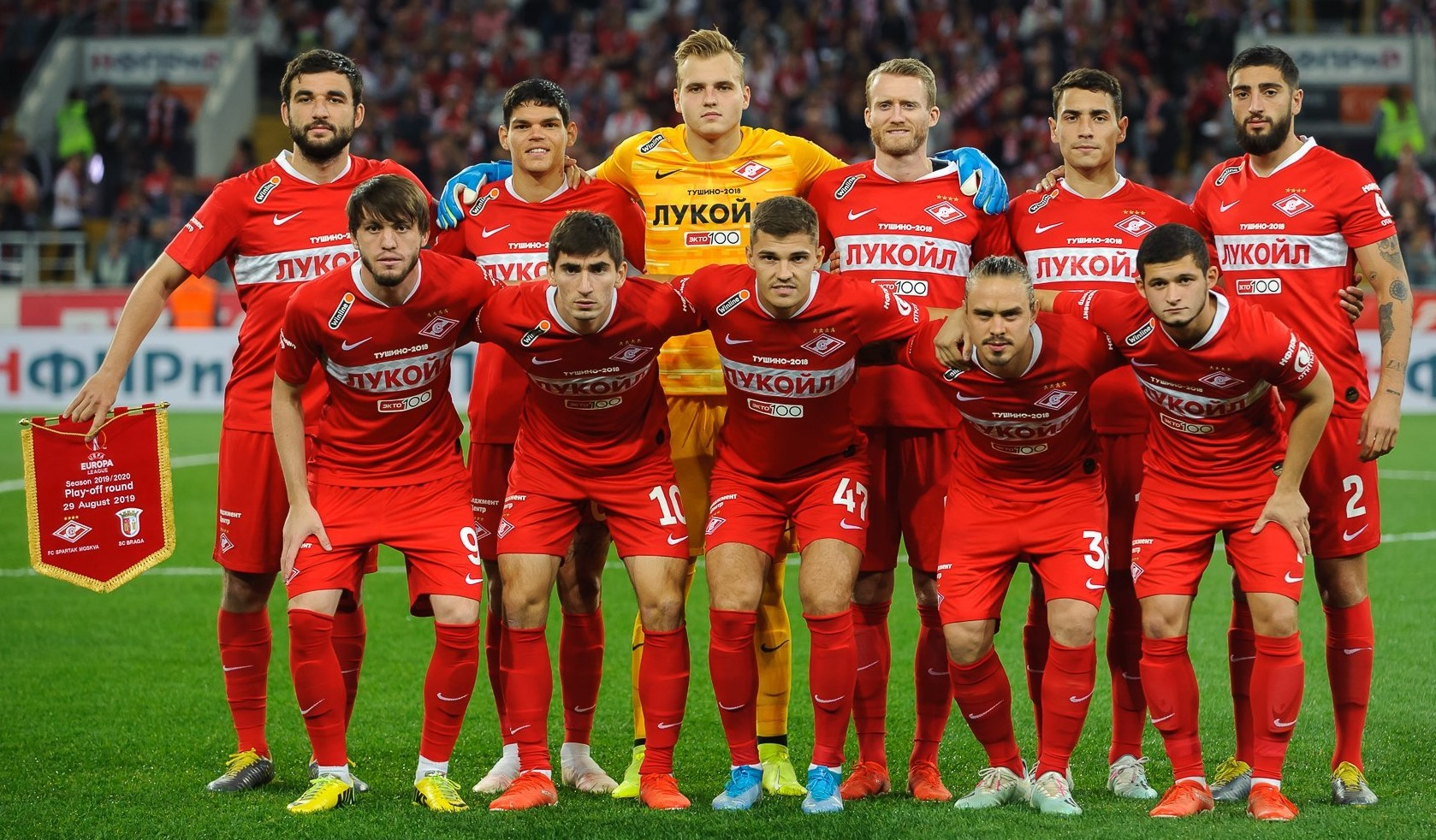
- Chairman: Tomas Zorn
- Manager: Oleg Kononov until 29 September; Serhiy Kuznetsov Caretaker; 29 September-14 October; Domenico Tedesco from 14 October
- Stadium: Otkrytiye Arena
- Premier League: 7th
- Russian Cup: Semi-finals
- UEFA Europa League: Play-off round
- Top goalscorer: League: Jordan Larsson (7); All: Ezequiel Ponce (11)
| Home colours | Away colours |

The 2019–20 Spartak Moscow season was the twenty-eighth successive season that the club played in the Russian Premier League, the highest tier of association football in Russia.

== Season events ==
On 29 September, Oleg Kononov resigned as manager with Serhiy Kuznetsov being appointed as Caretaker manager. On 14 October, Domenico Tedesco was appointed as the new head coach on a contract until June 2021.

On 17 March, the Russian Premier League postponed all league fixtures until 10 April due to the COVID-19 pandemic.

On 1 April, the Russian Football Union extended the suspension of football until 31 May.

On 15 May, the Russian Football Union announced that the Russian Premier League season would resume on 21 June.

On 18 May, Spartak Moscow announced that they had exercised their option to purchase Aleksandr Sobolev from Krylia Sovetov.

On 25 June, Spartak Moscow signed a new contracts with Pavel Maslov and Ilya Golosov until the summer of 2024.

== Squad ==
As of match played 22 July 2020

| No. | Name | Nationality | Position | Date of birth (age) | Signed from | Signed in | Contract ends | Apps. | Goals |
|---|---|---|---|---|---|---|---|---|---|
| 27 | Timur Akmurzin | (Russia) | GK | 7 December 1997 (aged 22) | Rubin Kazan | 2019 | | 0 | 0 |
| 30 | Andrea Romagnoli | (Italy) | GK | 29 July 1998 (aged 21) | Roma | 2019 | | 0 | 0 |
| 31 | Anton Shitov | (Russia) | GK | 29 January 2000 (aged 20) | Ararat Moscow | 2018 | | 0 | 0 |
| 32 | Artyom Rebrov | (Russia) | GK | 4 March 1984 (aged 36) | Shinnik Yaroslavl | 2011 | | 131 | 0 |
| 48 | Daniil Yarusov | (Russia) | GK | 25 January 2001 (aged 19) | Youth team | 2018 | | 0 | 0 |
| 57 | Aleksandr Selikhov | (Russia) | GK | 7 April 1994 (aged 26) | Amkar Perm | 2016 | | 37 | 0 |
| 85 | Aleksandr Alekseev | (Russia) | GK | 14 February 2002 (aged 18) | Youth team | 2019 | | 0 | 0 |
| 91 | Daniil Markov | (Russia) | GK | 1 January 2001 (aged 19) | Youth team | 2018 | | 0 | 0 |
| 98 | Aleksandr Maksimenko | (Russia) | GK | 23 February 1998 (aged 22) | Youth Team | 2014 | | 68 | 0 |
Defenders
| 2 | Samuel Gigot | (France) | DF | 12 October 1993 (aged 26) | Gent | 2018 | 2022 | 45 | 5 |
| 6 | Ayrton Lucas | (Brazil) | DF | 19 June 1997 (aged 23) | Fluminense | 2018 | | 49 | 0 |
| 14 | Georgi Dzhikiya | (Russia) | DF | 21 November 1993 (aged 26) | Amkar Perm | 2016 | | 103 | 3 |
| 17 | Georgi Tigiyev | (Russia) | DF | 20 June 1995 (aged 25) | Anzhi Makhachkala | 2017 | | 7 | 0 |
| 21 | Malcolm Badu | (Germany) | DF | 23 June 1997 (aged 23) | VfL Wolfsburg II | 2019 | | 0 | 0 |
| 29 | Ilya Kutepov | (Russia) | DF | 29 July 1993 (aged 26) | Akademiya Tolyatti | 2012 | | 91 | 2 |
| 35 | Leonid Mironov | (Russia) | DF | 14 September 1998 (aged 21) | Youth team | 2015 | | 0 | 0 |
| 36 | Artyom Voropayev | (Russia) | DF | 30 October 1999 (aged 20) | Lada-Tolyatti | 2018 | 2019 | 0 | 0 |
| 38 | Andrey Yeshchenko | (Russia) | DF | 9 February 1984 (aged 36) | Anzhi Makhachkala | 2016 | | 94 | 1 |
| 39 | Pavel Maslov | (Russia) | DF | 14 April 2000 (aged 20) | Tyumen | 2018 | 2024 | 11 | 0 |
| 46 | Artyom Gorbulin | (Russia) | DF | 30 January 1999 (aged 21) | Dynamo Moscow | 2018 | | 0 | 0 |
| 49 | Roman Shishkin | (Russia) | DF | 27 January 1987 (aged 33) | Torpedo Moscow | 2020 | | 86 | 1 |
| 55 | Vitali Dyakov | (Russia) | DF | 31 January 1989 (aged 31) | Dinamo Minsk | 2020 | | 0 | 0 |
| 56 | Ilya Gaponov | (Russia) | DF | 25 October 1997 (aged 22) | Strogino Moscow | 2018 | | 10 | 0 |
| 61 | Ilya Golosov | (Russia) | DF | 9 August 2001 (aged 18) | Lokomotiv Moscow | 2019 | 2024 | 2 | 0 |
| 63 | Daniil Petrunin | (Russia) | DF | 10 June 1999 (aged 21) | Youth team | 2015 | | 0 | 0 |
| 67 | Maksim Sazonov | (Russia) | DF | 2 April 2000 (aged 20) | Youth team | 2017 | | 0 | 0 |
| 92 | Nikolai Rasskazov | (Russia) | DF | 4 January 1998 (aged 22) | Youth team | 2015 | | 50 | 2 |
| 93 | Nikita Morgunov | (Russia) | DF | 31 January 2001 (aged 19) | Youth team | 2018 | | 0 | 0 |
Midfielders
| 4 | Nikolai Tyunin | (Russia) | MF | 6 January 1987 (aged 33) | Khimki | 2018 | | 1 | 0 |
| 7 | Ayaz Guliyev | (Russia) | MF | 27 November 1996 (aged 23) | Youth team | 2012 | | 26 | 1 |
| 8 | Guus Til | (Netherlands) | MF | 22 December 1997 (aged 22) | AZ Alkmaar | 2019 | | 21 | 2 |
| 10 | Zelimkhan Bakayev | (Russia) | MF | 1 July 1996 (aged 24) | Youth team | 2013 | | 42 | 10 |
| 22 | Mikhail Ignatov | (Russia) | MF | 4 May 2000 (aged 20) | Youth team | 2016 | | 13 | 1 |
| 25 | Lorenzo Melgarejo | (Paraguay) | MF | 10 August 1990 (aged 29) | Kuban Krasnodar | 2016 | | 116 | 17 |
| 33 | Alex Král | (Czech Republic) | MF | 19 May 1998 (aged 22) | Slavia Prague | 2019 | | 23 | 0 |
| 42 | Vladislav Vasilyev | (Russia) | MF | 27 July 1999 (aged 20) | Dnepr Smolensk | 2019 | | 19 | 0 |
| 43 | Pyotr Volodkin | (Russia) | MF | 4 March 1999 (aged 21) | Youth team | 2015 | | 0 | 0 |
| 47 | Roman Zobnin | (Russia) | MF | 11 February 1994 (aged 26) | Dynamo Moscow | 2016 | | 117 | 5 |
| 54 | Nail Umyarov | (Russia) | MF | 27 June 2000 (aged 20) | Chertanovo Moscow | 2019 | | 26 | 0 |
| 68 | Ruslan Litvinov | (Russia) | MF | 18 August 2001 (aged 18) | Youth team | 2018 | | 0 | 0 |
| 70 | Ivan Repyakh | (Russia) | MF | 18 October 2001 (aged 18) | Youth team | 2018 | | 0 | 0 |
| 71 | Stepan Melnikov | (Russia) | MF | 25 April 2002 (aged 18) | Youth team | 2019 | | 0 | 0 |
| 74 | Dmitri Markitesov | (Russia) | MF | 22 March 2001 (aged 19) | Youth team | 2018 | | 2 | 0 |
| 76 | Maksim Kalachevsky | (Russia) | MF | 5 February 1999 (aged 21) | Youth team | 2018 | | 0 | 0 |
| 78 | Maksim Danilin | (Russia) | MF | 13 September 2001 (aged 18) | Youth team | 2018 | | 0 | 0 |
| 80 | Nikita Bakalyuk | (Russia) | MF | 3 April 2001 (aged 19) | Youth team | 2018 | | 1 | 0 |
| 84 | Stepan Oganesyan | (Russia) | MF | 28 September 2001 (aged 18) | Youth team | 2019 | | 0 | 0 |
| 87 | Svyatoslav Kozhedub | (Russia) | MF | 22 May 2002 (aged 18) | Youth team | 2019 | | 0 | 0 |
Forwards
| 9 | Reziuan Mirzov | (Russia) | FW | 22 June 1993 (aged 27) | Rostov | 2019 | | 26 | 1 |
| 13 | Nikoloz Kutateladze | (Georgia (country)) | FW | 19 March 2001 (aged 19) | Anzhi Makhachkala | 2019 | | 0 | 0 |
| 19 | Ezequiel Ponce | (Argentina) | FW | 29 March 1997 (aged 23) | Roma | 2019 | | 34 | 11 |
| 23 | Jordan Larsson | (Sweden) | FW | 20 June 1997 (aged 23) | IFK Norrköping | 2019 | | 30 | 10 |
| 28 | Thierno Thioub | (Senegal) | FW | 1 June 1998 (aged 22) | Stade de Mbour | 2018 | | 0 | 0 |
| 49 | Idrisa Sambú | (Portugal) | FW | 27 March 1998 (aged 22) | Porto B | 2016 | | 0 | 0 |
| 66 | Sylvanus Nimely | (Liberia) | FW | 4 April 1998 (aged 22) | MFK Karviná | 2016 | | 1 | 0 |
| 77 | Aleksandr Sobolev | (Russia) | FW | 7 March 1997 (aged 23) | Krylia Sovetov | 2020 | | 13 | 3 |
| 79 | Aleksandr Rudenko | (Russia) | FW | 15 March 1999 (aged 21) | Youth team | 2015 | | 0 | 0 |
| 89 | Ilya Golyatov | (Russia) | FW | 6 April 2002 (aged 18) | Youth team | 2019 | | 0 | 0 |
Away on loan
| 15 | Maksim Glushenkov | (Russia) | MF | 28 July 1999 (aged 20) | Chertanovo Moscow | 2019 | | 6 | 0 |
| 23 | Aleksandr Lomovitsky | (Russia) | MF | 27 January 1998 (aged 22) | Youth team | 2015 | | 25 | 0 |
| 37 | Georgi Melkadze | (Russia) | MF | 4 April 1997 (aged 23) | Youth team | 2014 | | 22 | 0 |
| 40 | Artyom Timofeyev | (Russia) | MF | 12 January 1994 (aged 26) | Youth team | 2012 | | 32 | 0 |
| 88 | Aleksandr Tashayev | (Russia) | MF | 23 June 1994 (aged 26) | Dynamo Moscow | 2018 | | 28 | 0 |
| 99 | Pedro Rocha | (Brazil) | FW | 1 October 1994 (aged 25) | Grêmio | 2017 | | 19 | 1 |
Players that left Spartak Moscow during the season
| 11 | Fernando | (Brazil) | MF | 3 March 1992 (aged 28) | Sampdoria | 2016 | | 99 | 11 |
| 12 | Luiz Adriano | (Brazil) | FW | 12 April 1987 (aged 33) | A.C. Milan | 2016 | | 78 | 35 |
| 17 | Soltmurad Bakayev | (Russia) | MF | 5 August 1999 (aged 20) | Youth team | 2015 | | 4 | 0 |
| 20 | André Schürrle | (Germany) | MF | 6 November 1990 (aged 29) | loan from Borussia Dortmund | 2019 | | 18 | 2 |
| 23 | Dmitri Kombarov | (Russia) | DF | 22 January 1987 (aged 33) | Dynamo Moscow | 2010 | | 274 | 26 |
| 94 | Sofiane Hanni | (Algeria) | MF | 4 March 1996 (aged 23) | Anderlecht | 2018 | | 38 | 6 |
| | Jano Ananidze | (Georgia (country)) | MF | 10 October 1992 (aged 27) | Youth Team | 2009 | | 147 | 16 |

=== Out on loan ===
Note: Flags indicate national team as defined under FIFA eligibility rules; some limited exceptions apply. Players may hold more than one non-FIFA nationality.

| No. | Pos. | Nation | Player |
|---|---|---|---|
| 15 | MF | RUS | Maksim Glushenkov (at Krylia Sovetov) |
| 23 | MF | RUS | Aleksandr Lomovitsky (at Arsenal Tula) |
| 37 | MF | RUS | Georgi Melkadze (at Tambov) |

| No. | Pos. | Nation | Player |
|---|---|---|---|
| 40 | MF | RUS | Artyom Timofeyev (at Krylia Sovetov Samara) |
| 88 | MF | RUS | Aleksandr Tashayev (at Rubin Kazan) |
| 99 | FW | BRA | Pedro Rocha (at Flamengo) |

=== Left club during season ===
Note: Flags indicate national team as defined under FIFA eligibility rules; some limited exceptions apply. Players may hold more than one non-FIFA nationality.

| No. | Pos. | Nation | Player |
|---|---|---|---|
| 11 | MF | BRA | Fernando (to Beijing Sinobo Guoan) |
| 12 | FW | BRA | Luiz Adriano (to Palmeiras) |
| 17 | MF | RUS | Soltmurad Bakayev (to Rubin Kazan) |
| 20 | MF | GER | André Schürrle (loan return to Borussia Dortmund) |

| No. | Pos. | Nation | Player |
|---|---|---|---|
| 23 | DF | RUS | Dmitri Kombarov (to Krylia Sovetov) |
| 94 | MF | ALG | Sofiane Hanni (to Al-Gharafa) |
| — | MF | GEO | Jano Ananidze (to Anorthosis Famagusta) |

== Transfers ==
=== In ===
| Date | Position | Nationality | Name | From | Fee | Ref. |
|---|---|---|---|---|---|---|
| Summer 2019 | GK | (Russia) | Timur Akmurzin | Rubin Kazan | Undisclosed | |
| Summer 2019 | GK | (Italy) | Andrea Romagnoli | Roma | Undisclosed | |
| Summer 2019 | DF | (Russia) | Artyom Voropayev | Lada-Tolyatti | Undisclosed | |
| 21 June 2019 | FW | (Argentina) | Ezequiel Ponce | Roma | Undisclosed | |
| 10 July 2019 | DF | (Germany) | Malcolm Badu | VfL Wolfsburg II | Undisclosed | |
| 18 July 2019 | FW | (Russia) | Reziuan Mirzov | Rostov | Undisclosed | |
| 2 August 2019 | FW | (Sweden) | Jordan Larsson | IFK Norrköping | Undisclosed | |
| 5 August 2019 | MF | (Netherlands) | Guus Til | AZ Alkmaar | Undisclosed | |
| 1 September 2019 | MF | (Czech Republic) | Alex Král | Slavia Prague | Undisclosed | |
| 1 July 2020 | FW | (Russia) | Aleksandr Sobolev | Krylia Sovetov | Undisclosed | |

=== Loans in ===
| Date from | Position | Nationality | Name | From | Date to | Ref. |
|---|---|---|---|---|---|---|
| 31 July 2019 | MF | (Germany) | André Schürrle | Borussia Dortmund | 1 July 2020 | |
| 29 January 2020 | FW | (Russia) | Aleksandr Sobolev | Krylia Sovetov | End of Season | |

=== Out ===
| Date | Position | Nationality | Name | To | Fee | Ref. |
|---|---|---|---|---|---|---|
| 23 June 2019 | MF | (Russia) | Ilya Mazurov | Fakel Voronezh | Undisclosed | |
| 4 July 2019 | GK | (Russia) | Danila Yermakov | Fakel Voronezh | Undisclosed | |
| 5 July 2019 | FW | (Cape Verde) | Zé Luís | Porto | Undisclosed | |
| 6 July 2019 | DF | (Russia) | Turgay Mokhbaliyev | Ufa | Undisclosed | |
| 22 July 2019 | MF | (Algeria) | Sofiane Hanni | Al-Gharafa | Undisclosed | |
| 30 July 2019 | FW | (Brazil) | Luiz Adriano | Palmeiras | Undisclosed | |
| 22 January 2020 | MF | (Russia) | Soltmurad Bakayev | Rubin Kazan | Undisclosed | |
| 28 February 2020 | MF | (Brazil) | Fernando | Beijing Guoan | Undisclosed | |
| 17 June 2020 | MF | (Russia) | Pyotr Volodkin | Chayka Peschanokopskoye | Undisclosed | |

=== Loans out ===
| Date from | Position | Nationality | Name | To | Date to | Ref. |
|---|---|---|---|---|---|---|
| 3 April 2019 | FW | (Brazil) | Pedro Rocha | Cruzeiro | 24 December 2019 | |
| 27 June 2019 | MF | (Russia) | Artyom Timofeyev | Krylia Sovetov Samara | End of Season | |
| 26 July 2019 | MF | (Russia) | Aleksandr Lomovitsky | Arsenal Tula | End of Season | |
| 30 July 2019 | MF | (Brazil) | Fernando | Beijing Guoan | 31 December 2019 | |
| 24 December 2019 | FW | (Brazil) | Pedro Rocha | Flamengo | | |
| 26 December 2019 | MF | (Russia) | Aleksandr Rudenko | Torpedo Moscow | End of Season | |

=== Released ===
| Date | Position | Nationality | Name | Joined | Date |
|---|---|---|---|---|---|
| Summer 2019 | GK | (Russia) | Vladislav Teryoshkin | Avangard Kursk | |
| Summer 2019 | DF | (Russia) | Artyom Mamin | Ural Yekaterinburg | |
| Summer 2019 | MF | (Russia) | Danil Poluboyarinov | Energetik-BGU Minsk | |
| Summer 2019 | MF | (Russia) | Yegor Rudkovsky | Chertanovo Moscow | |
| Summer 2019 | FW | (Russia) | Danila Proshlyakov | Rostov | 11 July 2019 |
| 19 June 2019 | MF | (Russia) | Denis Glushakov | Akhmat Grozny | 29 June 2019 |
| 6 July 2019 | DF | (Italy) | Salvatore Bocchetti | Verona | 25 July 2019 |
| 19 June 2019 | DF | (Russia) | Dmitri Kombarov | Krylia Sovetov | 9 July 2019 |
| 21 January 2020 | MF | (Georgia (country)) | Jano Ananidze | Anorthosis Famagusta | |
| 30 June 2020 | GK | (Russia) | Aleksandr Alekseyev | | |
| 30 June 2020 | GK | (Russia) | Daniil Yarusov | Chayka Peschanokopskoye | 5 August 2020 |
| 30 June 2020 | DF | (Russia) | Vitali Dyakov | | |
| 30 June 2020 | DF | (Russia) | Artyom Gorbulin | Avangard Kursk | 20 July 2020 |
| 30 June 2020 | DF | (Russia) | Roman Shishkin | | |
| 30 June 2020 | MF | (Russia) | Maksim Kalachevsky | | |
| 30 June 2020 | MF | (Russia) | Stepan Melnikov | | |
| 30 June 2020 | MF | (Russia) | Nikolai Tyunin | | |
| 30 June 2020 | FW | (Paraguay) | Lorenzo Melgarejo | Racing Club | 25 August 2020 |
| 30 June 2020 | FW | (Portugal) | Idrisa Sambú | | |
| 30 June 2020 | FW | (Senegal) | Thierno Thioub | | |

== Friendlies ==
| 1 February 2020 Match Premier Cup | Spartak Moscow (Russia) | 2–1 | (Russia) Rostov | Doha, Qatar |
| 18:00 MSK (UTC+3) | Schürrle (yellow card) 7'; Dzhikiya (yellow card) 11'; Mirzov 50', 75' | Report | Normann (yellow card) 43'; Hadžikadunić 89' | Stadium: Aspire Dome |

| 5 February 2020 Match Premier Cup | Spartak Moscow (Russia) | 1–1 (2–4 p) | (Russia) Lokomotiv Moscow | Doha, Qatar |
| 18:00 MSK (UTC+3) | Gaponov 48' | Report | Ignatyev 27'; Magkeyev (yellow card) 30'; Ćorluka (yellow card) 53'; Zhemaletdinov (yellow card) 90' | Stadium: Aspire Dome |
| | Penalties |
| | Ayrton (penalty scored); Glushenkov (penalty missed); Král (penalty missed); Mirzov (penalty scored) | | Miranchuk (penalty scored); Zhemaletdinov (penalty scored); Höwedes (penalty missed); Krychowiak (penalty scored); Barinov (penalty scored) |

| 8 February 2020 Match Premier Cup | Spartak Moscow (Russia) | 3–2 | (Serbia) Partizan | Doha, Qatar |
| 18:00 MSK (UTC+3) | Zobnin 7'; Mirzov (yellow card) 36'; Gigot (yellow card) 36'; Sobolev 48' (yellow card) 86'; Ponce 70' (pen.) | Report | Pavlović 16'; Natkho (yellow card) 32' (yellow-red card) 42'; Souma 34' | Stadium: Aspire Dome |

| 16 February 2020 | Ararat Yerevan (Armenia) | 1–3 | (Russia) Spartak Moscow | Sochi, Russia |
| 14:00 MSK (UTC+3) | W.Junior 23' | Report | Ponce 18'; Zobnin 68'; Larsson 89' |

| 22 February 2020 | Spartak Moscow (Russia) | 4–0 | (Uzbekistan) Pakhtakor Tashkent | Moscow, Russia |
| 14:00 MSK (UTC+3) | Sobolev 21'; Ponce 27'; Larsson 84'; Til 87' | Report | | Stadium: Otkrytie Arena |

== Competitions ==
=== Russian Premier League ===
==== Results by round ====
| Round | 1 | 2 | 3 | 4 | 5 | 6 | 7 | 8 | 9 | 10 | 11 | 12 | 13 | 14 | 15 | 16 | 17 | 18 | 19 | 20 | 21 | 22 | 23 | 24 | 25 | 26 | 27 | 28 | 29 | 30 |
|---|---|---|---|---|---|---|---|---|---|---|---|---|---|---|---|---|---|---|---|---|---|---|---|---|---|---|---|---|---|---|
| Ground | H | A | A | H | A | H | A | H | H | A | H | A | H | A | H | H | A | A | H | A | H | A | A | H | A | H | H | A | H | A |
| Result | W | D | L | D | W | W | W | L | L | L | L | L | D | W | L | W | D | L | L | W | L | W | W | D | L | L | D | L | W | W |
| Position | 5 | 6 | 10 | 11 | 7 | 4 | 2 | 6 | 6 | 9 | 9 | 12 | 10 | 7 | 10 | 6 | 6 | 10 | 10 | 9 | 10 | 8 | 6 | 6 | 7 | 8 | 11 | 11 | 9 | 7 |

Updated to match(es) played on 22 July 2020. Source: See Results
A = Away; H = Home; W = Win; D = Draw; L = Loss

==== Results ====
| 13 July 2019 1 | Spartak Moscow | 1–0 | Sochi | Moscow |
| 19:00 MSK (UTC+3) | Lomovitsky (yellow card) 14'; Rasskazov (yellow card) 56'; Ponce (yellow card) 72'; Luiz Adriano (yellow card) 76'; Gigot 90+3' | Report | Tsallagov (yellow card) 42'; Novoseltsev (yellow card) 68' | Stadium: Otkritie Arena; Attendance: 29,892; Referee: Vladimir Moskalyov |

| 20 July 2019 2 | Rostov | 2–2 | Spartak Moscow | Rostov-on-Don |
| 21:30 MSK (UTC+3) | Bayramyan 23'; Zuyev (yellow card) 60' (goal) 90+1'; Eremenko (yellow card) 63' | Report | Luiz Adriano 25' (pen.); Dzhikiya 66'; Melkadze (yellow card) 73'; Bakayev (yellow card) 84'; Fernando (yellow card) 88' | Stadium: Rostov Arena; Attendance: 35,865; Referee: Kirill Levnikov |

| 27 July 2019 3 | Tambov | 2–0 | Spartak Moscow | Saransk |
| 16:30 MSK (UTC+3) | Gogoua 29' (yellow card) 54'; Takazov (yellow card) 53' (goal) 69'; Shelia (yellow card) 90' | Report | Guliyev (yellow card) 3'; Ponce (yellow card) 59'; Gigot (yellow card) 69'; Mirzov (yellow card) 82' | Stadium: Mordovia Arena; Attendance: 23,238; Referee: Mikhail Vilkov |
Note: Match played at the Mordovia Arena in Saransk instead of Tambov's regular Spartak Stadium.

| 3 August 2019 4 | Spartak Moscow | 0–0 | Dynamo Moscow | Moscow |
| 19:00 MSK (UTC+3) | Tashayev (yellow card) 10'; Guliyev (yellow card) 32'; Ponce (red card) 35'; Bakayev (yellow card) 90+4'; Maksimenko (yellow card) 90+5' | Report | Yusupov (yellow card) 57'; Šunjić (yellow card) 85'; N'Jie (yellow card) 89' | Stadium: Otkritie Arena; Attendance: 34,389; Referee: Vladislav Bezborodov |

| 11 August 2019 5 | Akhmat Grozny | 1–3 | Spartak Moscow | Grozny |
| 21:30 MSK (UTC+3) | Shvets (yellow card) 13'; Mbengue 75' (yellow card) 75' (yellow-red card) 77'; Berisha (yellow card) 80' | Report | Til (yellow card) 8'; Bakayev 32', 44'; Schürrle 70'; Zobnin (yellow card) 90' | Stadium: Akhmat-Arena; Attendance: 17,832; Referee: Aleksey Sukhoy |

| 19 August 2019 6 | Spartak Moscow | 2–1 | CSKA Moscow | Moscow |
| 20:00 MSK (UTC+3) | Larsson (yellow card) 36'; Gigot 59', 79' | Report | Fernandes 68'; Magnússon (yellow card) 71'; Nababkin (yellow card) 90+5' | Stadium: Otkritie Arena; Attendance: 44,434; Referee: Sergei Karasev |

| 25 August 2019 7 | Krylia Sovetov | 1–2 | Spartak Moscow | Samara |
| 19:00 MSK (UTC+3) | Gînsari (yellow card) 23'; Sobolev 42'; Radonjić (yellow card) 71'; Anyukov (yellow card) 81' | Report | Dzhikiya (yellow card) 24'; Zobnin (yellow card) 29'; Larsson (yellow card) 32' (goal) 54'; Ayrton (yellow card) 83'; Guliyev (yellow card) 90'; Til 90+1'; Bakayev (yellow card) 90+4' | Stadium: Samara Arena; Attendance: 32,286; Referee: Sergey Lapochkin |

| 1 September 2019 8 | Spartak Moscow | 0–1 | Zenit St.Petersburg | Moscow |
| 19:00 MSK (UTC+3) | Guliyev (yellow card) 3'; Ayrton (yellow card) 15' | Report | Ozdoyev (yellow card) 27'; Zhirkov 41' (yellow card) 54'; Rigoni (yellow card) 44'; Ivanović (yellow card) 61'; Douglas Santos (yellow card) 65' | Stadium: Otkritie Arena; Attendance: 43,482; Referee: Vitali Meshkov |

| 14 September 2019 9 | Spartak Moscow | 1–2 | Ural Yekaterinburg | Moscow |
| 16:30 MSK (UTC+3) | Gigot 12' (yellow card) 84'; Til (yellow card) 64'; Rasskazov (yellow card) 90+1' | Report | El Kabir (yellow card) 42' (goal) 60'; Ilyin 48'; Augustyniak (yellow card) 55'; Haroyan (yellow card) 69' | Stadium: Otkritie Arena; Attendance: 24,198; Referee: Sergey Ivanov |

| 20 September 2019 10 | Ufa | 1–0 | Spartak Moscow | Ufa |
| 17:30 MSK (UTC+3) | Rasskazov 13' (o.g.); Thill (yellow card) 26'; Tabidze (yellow card) 74' | Report | Gigot (yellow card) 16'; Guliyev (yellow card) 33'; Schürrle (yellow card) 72'; Til (yellow card) 79'; Kutepov (yellow card) 86' | Stadium: Neftyanik Stadium; Attendance: 10,809; Referee: Aleksey Sukhoy |

| 29 September 2019 11 | Spartak Moscow | 1–2 | Orenburg | Moscow |
| 16:30 MSK (UTC+3) | Kutepov (yellow card) 6'; Melgarejo 65'; Bakayev (yellow card) 90+4' | Report | Terekhov (yellow card) 21'; Miškić (yellow card) 32' (yellow-red card) 71'; Malykh 45'; Despotović 63' | Stadium: Otkritie Arena; Attendance: 20,817; Referee: Stanislav Vasilyev |

| 6 October 2019 12 | Krasnodar | 2–1 | Spartak Moscow | Krasnodar |
| 19:00 MSK (UTC+3) | Berg 3'; Petrov 20'; Olsson (yellow card) 64'; Ramírez (yellow card) 67'; Kaio (yellow card) 70' (yellow-red card) 88'; Ari (yellow card) 85' | Report | Mirzov (yellow card) 33'; Larsson 45'; Kutepov (yellow card) 90'; Dzhikiya (yellow card) 90+2' (yellow-red card) 90+2' | Stadium: Krasnodar Stadium; Attendance: 32,238; Referee: Vitali Meshkov |

| 19 October 2019 13 | Spartak Moscow | 0–0 | Rubin Kazan | Moscow |
| 16:30 MSK (UTC+3) | Schürrle (yellow card) 48' | Report | Denisov (yellow card) 54'; Mogilevets (yellow card) 60'; Pliyev (yellow card) 90+1' | Stadium: Otkritie Arena; Attendance: 26,844; Referee: Sergey Lapochkin |

| 27 October 2019 14 | Lokomotiv Moscow | 0–3 | Spartak Moscow | Moscow |
| 16:30 MSK (UTC+3) | Ignatyev (yellow card) 41'; Barinov (yellow card) 42'; Eder (yellow card) 71'; Ćorluka (yellow card) 88' | Report | Dzhikiya (yellow card) 22'; Bakayev (yellow card) 45+1'; Ponce 57'; Larsson 79', 81' | Stadium: RZD Arena; Attendance: 22,863; Referee: Aleksey Eskov |

| 4 November 2019 15 | Spartak Moscow | 0–1 | Arsenal Tula | Moscow |
| 19:00 MSK (UTC+3) | Umyarov (yellow card) 86' | Report | Lutsenko 16' (yellow card) 30'; Denisov (yellow card) 60' | Stadium: Otkritie Arena; Attendance: 19,310; Referee: Aleksey Sukhoy |

| 9 November 2019 16 | Spartak Moscow | 2–0 | Krylia Sovetov | Moscow |
| 19:00 MSK (UTC+3) | Ponce 3'; Bakayev (yellow card) 76' (goal) 83' (pen.); Král (yellow card) 80' | Report | Mijailović (red card) 71'; Karpov (red card) 82' | Stadium: Otkritie Arena; Attendance: 18,719; Referee: Vitali Meshkov |

| 24 November 2019 17 | Ural Yekaterinburg | 0–0 | Spartak Moscow | Yekaterinburg |
| 14:00 MSK (UTC+3) | Ilyin (yellow card) 59' | Report | Umyarov (yellow card) 58' | Stadium: Central Stadium; Attendance: 14,637; Referee: Nikolay Voloshin |

| 1 December 2019 18 | Zenit St.Petersburg | 1–0 | Spartak Moscow | Saint Petersburg |
| 19:00 MSK (UTC+3) | Ozdoyev (yellow card) 15' (yellow-red card) 49'; Kutepov 21' (o.g.); Shatov (yellow card) 28' | Report | Bakayev (yellow card) 29'; Kutepov (yellow card) 34'; Umyarov (yellow card) 44'; Král (yellow card) 67'; Gigot (yellow card) 75'; Schürrle (yellow card) 88' | Stadium: Krestovsky Stadium; Attendance: 55,119; Referee: Vitali Meshkov |

| 8 December 2019 19 | Spartak Moscow | 1–4 | Rostov | Moscow |
| 19:00 MSK (UTC+3) | Dzhikiya (yellow card) 38'; Král (yellow card) 42'; Umyarov (yellow card) 77'; Ponce 81' | Report | Popov (yellow card) 18' (penalty missed) 45'; Zaynutdinov 22', 83'; Ionov 53'; Chistyakov 79'; Saplinov (yellow card) 90+2' | Stadium: Otkritie Arena; Attendance: 22,132; Referee: Evgeny Turbin |

| 29 February 2020 20 | Dynamo Moscow | 0–2 | Spartak Moscow | Moscow |
| 16:30 MSK (UTC+3) | Šunjić (yellow card) 64'; Rykov (yellow card) 67' | Report | Bakayev 29'; Zobnin 62' | Stadium: VTB Arena; Attendance: 24,946; Referee: Sergei Karasev |

| 9 March 2020 21 | Spartak Moscow | 0–1 | Krasnodar | Moscow |
| 16:30 MSK (UTC+3) | Yeshchenko (yellow card) 41'; Gigot (yellow card) 45+1'; Zobnin (yellow card) 63' (yellow-red card) 90+2'; Sobolev (yellow card) 77' | Report | Chernikov (yellow card) 25'; Ramírez (yellow card) 37'; Ari 71' (pen.) (yellow card) 83' | Stadium: Otkritie Arena; Attendance: 28,245; Referee: Sergey Lapochkin |

| 14 March 2020 22 | Orenburg | 1–3 | Spartak Moscow | Orenburg |
| 14:00 MSK (UTC+3) | Fameyeh 17'; Terekhov (yellow card) 45+3'; Miškić (yellow card) 56' | Report | Maslov (yellow card) 29'; Ponce 44'; Larsson 71'; Ayrton (yellow card) 90+3'; Mirzov 90+4' | Stadium: Gazovik Stadium; Attendance: 4,935; Referee: Vasiliy Kazartsev |

| 20 June 2020 23 | Arsenal Tula | 2 – 3 | Spartak Moscow | Tula |
| 16:30 MSK (UTC+3) | Tkachyov (yellow card) 68'; Kavalyow (yellow card) 72'; Banda (yellow card) 90+1'; Lutsenko 90+4'; Lesovoy (penalty missed) 90+8' 90+9' | Report | Gigot (yellow card) 3'; Sobolev (yellow card) 28' (goal) 44'; Ayrton (yellow card) 42'; Bakayev (yellow card) 45+4'; Rasskazov 66'; Ponce 79'; Dzhikiya (yellow card) 90+5'; Yeshchenko (yellow card) 90+5' | Stadium: Arsenal Stadium; Referee: Evgeny Turbin |
Note: Match originally scheduled for 21 March, but postponed on 17 March due to the COVID-19 pandemic.

| 27 June 2020 24 | Spartak Moscow | 0 – 0 | Ufa | Moscow |
| 16:30 MSK (UTC+3) | Maslov (yellow card) 43'; Král (yellow card) 80' | Report | Nedelcearu (yellow card) 16'; Tabidze (yellow card) 44' | Stadium: Otkritie Arena; Referee: Vladislav Bezborodov |
Note: Match originally scheduled for 4 April, but postponed on 17 March due to the COVID-19 pandemic.

| 30 June 2020 25 | CSKA Moscow | 2 – 0 | Spartak Moscow | Moscow |
| 20:30 MSK (UTC+3) | Vlašić 27', 90+6'; Chalov (yellow card) 41'; Shchennikov (yellow card) 43'; Nababkin (yellow card) 51'; Bistrović (yellow card) 74'; Fernandes (yellow card) 85' | Report | Maslov (yellow card) 22'; Gigot (yellow card) 37'; Zobnin (red card) 77' | Stadium: VEB Arena; Referee: Aleksey Eskov |
Note: Match originally scheduled for 12 April, but postponed on 1 April due to the COVID-19 pandemic.

| 4 July 2020 26 | Spartak Moscow | 2 – 3 | Tambov | Moscow |
| 18:30 MSK (UTC+3) | Umyarov (yellow card) 26'; Bakayev 36' (pen.); Dzhikiya (yellow card) 53'; Larsson 64'; Gigot (yellow card) 81'; Rasskazov (yellow card) 86' | Report | Oyewole (yellow card) 34'; Takazov (yellow card) 34'; Ciupercă (yellow card) 46' (goal) 60'; Gritsayenko 73'; Obukhov 82' (pen.) | Stadium: Otkritie Arena; Referee: Vladimir Moskalyov |
Note: Match originally scheduled for 19 April, but postponed on 1 April due to the COVID-19 pandemic.

| 8 July 2020 27 | Spartak Moscow | 1 – 1 | Lokomotiv Moscow | Moscow |
| 20:30 MSK (UTC+3) | Ponce (yellow card) 13' (goal) 38'; Bakayev (yellow card) 45+1'; Dzhikiya (yellow card) 90' | Report | Rybus (yellow card) 3'; Kulikov (yellow card) 8'; Magkeyev (yellow card) 27'; Al.Miranchuk 43' (pen.) | Stadium: Otkritie Arena; Referee: Sergey Lapochkin |
Note: Match originally scheduled for 26 April, but postponed on 1 April due to the COVID-19 pandemic.

| 11 July 2020 28 | Sochi | 1 – 0 | Spartak Moscow | Sochi |
| 20:30 MSK (UTC+3) | Zaika (yellow card) 9'; Mevlja (yellow card) 19'; Maslov 24' (o.g.); Poloz (yellow card) 41'; Margasov (yellow card) 63'; Kokorin (yellow card) 90+2' | Report | Ayrton (yellow card) 30'; Umyarov (yellow card) 50'; Rebrov (yellow card) 85'; Mirzov (yellow card) 88' | Stadium: Fisht Olympic Stadium; Referee: Sergey Ivanov |
Note: Match originally scheduled for 1 May, but postponed on 1 April due to the COVID-19 pandemic.

| 15 July 2020 29 | Spartak Moscow | 3 – 0 | Akhmat Grozny | Moscow |
| 18:00 MSK (UTC+3) | Zobnin 51'; Sobolev 81'; Til (yellow card) 90' (goal) 90+3' | Report | Nenakhov (yellow card) 26'; Nižić (yellow card) 39' | Stadium: Otkritie Arena; Referee: Aleksey Sukhoy |
Note: Match originally scheduled for 6 May, but postponed on 1 April due to the COVID-19 pandemic.

| 22 July 2020 30 | Rubin Kazan | 1 – 2 | Spartak Moscow | Kazan |
| 19:00 MSK (UTC+3) | Samoshnikov (yellow card) 4'; Starfelt (yellow card) 38'; Ignatyev 44' (pen.); Konovalov (yellow card) 63'; Uremović (yellow card) 70'; Kvaratskhelia (yellow card) 90' | Report | Ponce (yellow card) 33'; Bakayev 40' (pen.); Larsson 71' (pen.); Rasskazov (yellow card) 74'; Dzhikiya (yellow card) 82'; Sobolev (yellow card) 90+2' | Stadium: Ak Bars Arena; Referee: Pavel Kukuyan |
Note: Match originally scheduled for 17 May, but postponed on 1 April due to the COVID-19 pandemic.

==== League table ====
| Pos | Team | Pld | W | D | L | GF | GA | GD | Pts | Qualification or relegation |
|---|---|---|---|---|---|---|---|---|---|---|
| 5 | Rostov | 30 | 12 | 9 | 9 | 45 | 50 | −5 | 45 | Qualification for the Europa League third qualifying round |
| 6 | Dynamo Moscow | 30 | 11 | 8 | 11 | 27 | 30 | −3 | 41 | Qualification for the Europa League second qualifying round |
| 7 | Spartak Moscow | 30 | 11 | 6 | 13 | 35 | 33 | +2 | 39 | |
| 8 | Arsenal Tula | 30 | 11 | 5 | 14 | 37 | 41 | −4 | 38 (Note: Head-to-head points: Arsenal Tula 4, Ufa 1) | |
| 9 | Ufa | 30 | 8 | 14 | 8 | 22 | 24 | −2 | 38 | |

Source: Russian Premier Liga, Soccerway
Rules for classification: 1) Points; 2) Head-to-head points; 3) Head-to-head matches won; 4) Head-to-head goal difference; 5) Head-to-head goals scored; 6) Matches won; 7) Goal difference; 8) Goals scored; 9) Play-off.

=== Russian Cup ===
| 25 September 2019 Round of 32 | KAMAZ | 1–2 | Spartak Moscow | Naberezhnye Chelny |
| 18:30 MSK (UTC+3) | Stefanovich (yellow card) 13'; Karayev 24' (pen.); Chyorny (yellow card) 87' | Report | Ponce 21', 76'; Král (yellow card) 29'; Gigot (yellow card) 78'; Zobnin (yellow card) 87' | Stadium: KAMAZ Stadium; Attendance: 5,980; Referee: Evgeny Turbin |

| 31 October 2019 Round of 16 | Spartak Moscow | 2–1 | Rostov | Moscow |
| 19:30 MSK (UTC+3) | Ponce (yellow card) 28'; Larsson 43', 59'; Ayrton (yellow card) 45'; Dzhikiya (yellow card) 73' | Report | Zaynutdinov (yellow card) 53'; Dolgov 86' | Stadium: Otkritie Arena; Referee: Pavel Kukuyan |

| 4 March 2020 Quarter-final | Spartak Moscow | 3–2 | CSKA Moscow | Moscow |
| 19:30 MSK (UTC+3) | Bakayev 4'; Ponce 14' (yellow card) 68' (yellow-red card) 103'; Kutepov (yellow card) 34'; Rebrov (yellow card) 105'; Larsson 107'; Zobnin (yellow card) 109' | Report | Diveyev 17'; Akhmetov 45+1'; Fernandes (yellow card) 45+3'; Oblyakov (yellow card) 80'; Karpov (yellow card) 97'; Nababkin (yellow card) 115' | Stadium: Otkrytiye Arena; Referee: Sergey Ivanov |

| 19 July 2020 Semi-final | Zenit St.Petersburg | 2 – 1 | Spartak Moscow | Saint Petersburg |
| 19:30 MSK (UTC+3) | Douglas (yellow card) 2'; Barrios (yellow card) 17'; Dzyuba 24' (pen.); Rakitskiy (yellow card) 27'; Kuzyayev 45+3' (yellow card) 81'; Ozdoyev (yellow card) 89' | Report | Gaponov (yellow card) 24'; Sobolev (yellow card) 39' (goal) 45+1'; Ayrton (yellow card) 74'; Dzhikiya (yellow card) 81'; Gigot (yellow card) 90+1' | Stadium: Krestovsky Stadium; Referee: Sergey Ivanov |

=== UEFA Europa League ===
==== Qualifying rounds ====
| 8 August 2019 Third qualifying round 1st leg | Thun (Switzerland) | 2–3 | (Russia) Spartak Moscow | Thun, Switzerland |
| 20:00 MSK (UTC+3) | Stillhart (yellow card) 8'; Havenaar (yellow card) 50'; Hefti 52'; Rapp 59' | Report | Ponce 22'; Bakayev 29', 73'; Maksimenko (yellow card) 58'; Gigot (yellow card) 90+3' | Stadium: Stockhorn Arena; Attendance: 6,150; Referee: Irfan Peljto (Bosnia and Herzegovina) |

| 15 August 2019 Third qualifying round 2nd leg | Spartak Moscow (Russia) | 2–1 (5–3 agg.) | (Switzerland) Thun | Moscow, Russia |
| 19:45 MSK (UTC+3) | Guliyev (yellow card) 48'; Ponce 52'; Schürrle 58' | Report | Glarner 7'; Havenaar (yellow card) 62'; Kablan (yellow card) 89' | Stadium: Otkritie Arena; Attendance: 33,076; Referee: Bojan Pandžić (Sweden) |

| 22 August 2019 Play-off round 1st leg | Braga (Portugal) | 1–0 | (Russia) Spartak Moscow | Braga, Portugal |
| 21:45 MSK (UTC+3) | Novais (yellow card) 51'; Horta 74' | Report | Guliyev (yellow card) 26'; Dzhikiya (yellow card) 78'; Bakayev (yellow card) 90+1' | Stadium: Estádio Municipal de Braga; Attendance: 11,667; Referee: Xavier Estrada Fernández (Spain) |

| 29 August 2019 Play-off round 2nd leg | Spartak Moscow (Russia) | 1–2 (1–3 agg.) | (Portugal) Braga | Moscow, Russia |
| 20:15 MSK (UTC+3) | Gigot (yellow card) 68'; Bakayev 89' | Report | Palhinha (yellow card) 16'; Horta (yellow card) 33' (goal) 42', 45+2'; Esgaio (yellow card) 46' | Stadium: Otkritie Arena; Referee: Davide Massa (Italy) |

== Squad statistics ==
As of match played 22 July 2020

=== Appearances and goals ===
| No. | Pos | Nat | Player | Total | | Premier League | | Russian Cup | | Europa League | |
| No. | Pos | Nat | Player | Apps | Goals | Apps | Goals | Apps | Goals | Apps | Goals |
|---|---|---|---|---|---|---|---|---|---|---|---|
| 2 | DF | (France) FRA | Samuel Gigot | 34 | 4 | 26 | 4 | 4 | 0 | 4 | 0 |
| 6 | DF | (Brazil) BRA | Ayrton Lucas | 35 | 0 | 27 | 0 | 4 | 0 | 4 | 0 |
| 7 | MF | (Russia) RUS | Ayaz Guliyev | 15 | 0 | 8+3 | 0 | 0 | 0 | 4 | 0 |
| 8 | MF | (Netherlands) NED | Guus Til | 21 | 2 | 10+8 | 2 | 1+2 | 0 | 0 | 0 |
| 9 | FW | (Russia) RUS | Reziuan Mirzov | 26 | 1 | 4+17 | 1 | 0+1 | 0 | 4 | 0 |
| 10 | MF | (Russia) RUS | Zelimkhan Bakayev | 35 | 10 | 26+1 | 6 | 4 | 1 | 4 | 3 |
| 14 | DF | (Russia) RUS | Georgi Dzhikiya | 35 | 1 | 27 | 1 | 4 | 0 | 4 | 0 |
| 15 | MF | (Russia) RUS | Maksim Glushenkov | 1 | 0 | 0+1 | 0 | 0 | 0 | 0 | 0 |
| 19 | FW | (Argentina) ARG | Ezequiel Ponce | 34 | 11 | 18+9 | 6 | 3 | 3 | 4 | 2 |
| 20 | MF | (Germany) GER | André Schürrle | 18 | 2 | 9+4 | 1 | 0+1 | 0 | 3+1 | 1 |
| 22 | MF | (Russia) RUS | Mikhail Ignatov | 1 | 0 | 0+1 | 0 | 0 | 0 | 0 | 0 |
| 23 | FW | (Sweden) SWE | Jordan Larsson | 30 | 10 | 19+7 | 7 | 3+1 | 3 | 0 | 0 |
| 25 | FW | (Paraguay) PAR | Lorenzo Melgarejo | 18 | 1 | 6+6 | 1 | 0+3 | 0 | 0+3 | 0 |
| 29 | DF | (Russia) RUS | Ilya Kutepov | 13 | 0 | 10+1 | 0 | 2 | 0 | 0 | 0 |
| 32 | GK | (Russia) RUS | Artyom Rebrov | 2 | 0 | 1 | 0 | 1 | 0 | 0 | 0 |
| 33 | MF | (Czech Republic) CZE | Alex Král | 23 | 0 | 18+1 | 0 | 4 | 0 | 0 | 0 |
| 38 | DF | (Russia) RUS | Andrey Yeshchenko | 18 | 0 | 8+6 | 0 | 0+1 | 0 | 3 | 0 |
| 39 | DF | (Russia) RUS | Pavel Maslov | 10 | 0 | 9 | 0 | 1 | 0 | 0 | 0 |
| 47 | MF | (Russia) RUS | Roman Zobnin | 32 | 2 | 24+1 | 2 | 3 | 0 | 4 | 0 |
| 54 | DF | (Russia) RUS | Nail Umyarov | 21 | 0 | 12+5 | 0 | 2 | 0 | 0+2 | 0 |
| 56 | DF | (Russia) RUS | Ilya Gaponov | 5 | 0 | 4 | 0 | 1 | 0 | 0 | 0 |
| 61 | DF | (Russia) RUS | Ilya Golosov | 2 | 0 | 0+2 | 0 | 0 | 0 | 0 | 0 |
| 74 | MF | (Russia) RUS | Dmitri Markitesov | 2 | 0 | 0+2 | 0 | 0 | 0 | 0 | 0 |
| 77 | FW | (Russia) RUS | Aleksandr Sobolev | 13 | 3 | 6+5 | 2 | 2 | 1 | 0 | 0 |
| 80 | MF | (Russia) RUS | Nikita Bakalyuk | 1 | 0 | 0+1 | 0 | 0 | 0 | 0 | 0 |
| 92 | DF | (Russia) RUS | Nikolai Rasskazov | 25 | 1 | 17+3 | 1 | 2+2 | 0 | 1 | 0 |
| 98 | GK | (Russia) RUS | Aleksandr Maksimenko | 36 | 0 | 29 | 0 | 3 | 0 | 4 | 0 |
Players away from the club on loan:
| 15 | MF | (Russia) RUS | Maksim Glushenkov | 1 | 0 | 0+1 | 0 | 0 | 0 | 0 | 0 |
| 23 | MF | (Russia) RUS | Aleksandr Lomovitsky | 1 | 0 | 1 | 0 | 0 | 0 | 0 | 0 |
| 37 | FW | (Russia) RUS | Georgi Melkadze | 3 | 0 | 0+2 | 0 | 0 | 0 | 0+1 | 0 |
| 88 | MF | (Russia) RUS | Aleksandr Tashayev | 4 | 0 | 1+2 | 0 | 0 | 0 | 0+1 | 0 |
Players who left Spartak Moscow during the season:
| 11 | MF | (Brazil) BRA | Fernando | 3 | 0 | 3 | 0 | 0 | 0 | 0 | 0 |
| 12 | FW | (Brazil) BRA | Luiz Adriano | 3 | 1 | 3 | 1 | 0 | 0 | 0 | 0 |
| 17 | MF | (Russia) RUS | Soltmurad Bakayev | 3 | 0 | 0+2 | 0 | 0 | 0 | 0+1 | 0 |
| 49 | MF | (Georgia (country)) GEO | Jano Ananidze | 10 | 0 | 4+2 | 0 | 0+1 | 0 | 1+2 | 0 |

=== Goal scorers ===
| Place | Position | Nation | Number | Name | Premier League | Russian Cup | Europa League | Total |
|---|---|---|---|---|---|---|---|---|
| 1 | FW | (Argentina) | 19 | Ezequiel Ponce | 6 | 3 | 2 | 11 |
| 2 | FW | (Sweden) | 23 | Jordan Larsson | 7 | 3 | 0 | 10 |
| 2 | MF | (Russia) | 10 | Zelimkhan Bakayev | 6 | 1 | 3 | 10 |
| 4 | DF | (France) | 2 | Samuel Gigot | 4 | 0 | 0 | 4 |
| 5 | FW | (Russia) | 77 | Aleksandr Sobolev | 2 | 1 | 0 | 3 |
| 6 | MF | (Russia) | 47 | Roman Zobnin | 2 | 0 | 0 | 2 |
| 6 | MF | (Netherlands) | 8 | Guus Til | 2 | 0 | 0 | 2 |
| 6 | MF | (Germany) | 20 | André Schürrle | 1 | 0 | 1 | 2 |
| 9 | FW | (Brazil) | 12 | Luiz Adriano | 1 | 0 | 0 | 1 |
| 9 | DF | (Russia) | 14 | Georgi Dzhikiya | 1 | 0 | 0 | 1 |
| 9 | FW | (Paraguay) | 25 | Lorenzo Melgarejo | 1 | 0 | 0 | 1 |
| 9 | FW | (Russia) | 9 | Reziuan Mirzov | 1 | 0 | 0 | 1 |
| 9 | DF | (Russia) | 92 | Nikolai Rasskazov | 1 | 0 | 0 | 1 |
| | | | | TOTALS | 35 | 8 | 6 | 49 |

=== Clean sheets ===
| Place | Position | Nation | Number | Name | Premier League | Russian Cup | Europa League | Total |
|---|---|---|---|---|---|---|---|---|
| 1 | GK | (Russia) | 98 | Aleksandr Maksimenko | 9 | 0 | 0 | 9 |
| | | | | TOTALS | 9 | 0 | 0 | 9 |

=== Disciplinary record ===
| Number | Nation | Position | Name | Premier League | | Russian Cup | | Europa League | | Total | |
| Number | Nation | Position | Name | Yellow card | Red card | Yellow card | Red card | Yellow card | Red card | Yellow card | Red card |
| 2 | (France) | DF | Samuel Gigot | 8 | 0 | 2 | 0 | 2 | 0 | 12 | 0 |
| 6 | (Brazil) | DF | Ayrton Lucas | 5 | 0 | 2 | 0 | 0 | 0 | 7 | 0 |
| 7 | (Russia) | MF | Ayaz Guliyev | 5 | 0 | 0 | 0 | 2 | 0 | 7 | 0 |
| 8 | (Netherlands) | MF | Guus Til | 4 | 0 | 0 | 0 | 0 | 0 | 4 | 0 |
| 9 | (Russia) | FW | Reziuan Mirzov | 3 | 0 | 0 | 0 | 0 | 0 | 3 | 0 |
| 10 | (Russia) | MF | Zelimkhan Bakayev | 8 | 0 | 0 | 0 | 1 | 0 | 9 | 0 |
| 14 | (Russia) | DF | Georgi Dzhikiya | 9 | 1 | 2 | 0 | 1 | 0 | 12 | 1 |
| 19 | (Argentina) | FW | Ezequiel Ponce | 4 | 1 | 3 | 1 | 0 | 0 | 7 | 2 |
| 20 | (Germany) | MF | André Schürrle | 3 | 0 | 0 | 0 | 0 | 0 | 3 | 0 |
| 23 | (Sweden) | FW | Jordan Larsson | 2 | 0 | 0 | 0 | 0 | 0 | 2 | 0 |
| 29 | (Russia) | DF | Ilya Kutepov | 4 | 0 | 1 | 0 | 0 | 0 | 5 | 0 |
| 32 | (Russia) | GK | Artyom Rebrov | 1 | 0 | 1 | 0 | 0 | 0 | 2 | 0 |
| 33 | (Czech Republic) | MF | Alex Král | 4 | 0 | 1 | 0 | 0 | 0 | 5 | 0 |
| 38 | (Russia) | DF | Andrey Yeshchenko | 2 | 0 | 0 | 0 | 0 | 0 | 2 | 0 |
| 39 | (Russia) | DF | Pavel Maslov | 3 | 0 | 0 | 0 | 0 | 0 | 3 | 0 |
| 47 | (Russia) | MF | Roman Zobnin | 4 | 2 | 2 | 0 | 0 | 0 | 6 | 2 |
| 54 | (Russia) | DF | Nail Umyarov | 6 | 0 | 0 | 0 | 0 | 0 | 6 | 0 |
| 56 | (Russia) | DF | Ilya Gaponov | 0 | 0 | 1 | 0 | 0 | 0 | 1 | 0 |
| 77 | (Russia) | FW | Aleksandr Sobolev | 3 | 0 | 1 | 0 | 0 | 0 | 4 | 0 |
| 92 | (Russia) | DF | Nikolai Rasskazov | 4 | 0 | 0 | 0 | 0 | 0 | 4 | 0 |
| 98 | (Russia) | GK | Aleksandr Maksimenko | 1 | 0 | 0 | 0 | 1 | 0 | 2 | 0 |
Players out on loan:
| 23 | (Russia) | MF | Aleksandr Lomovitsky | 1 | 0 | 0 | 0 | 0 | 0 | 1 | 0 |
| 37 | (Russia) | FW | Georgi Melkadze | 1 | 0 | 0 | 0 | 0 | 0 | 1 | 0 |
| 88 | (Russia) | MF | Aleksandr Tashayev | 1 | 0 | 0 | 0 | 0 | 0 | 1 | 0 |
Players who left Spartak Moscow during the season:
| 11 | (Brazil) | MF | Fernando | 1 | 0 | 0 | 0 | 0 | 0 | 1 | 0 |
| 12 | (Brazil) | FW | Luiz Adriano | 1 | 0 | 0 | 0 | 0 | 0 | 1 | 0 |
| 17 | (Russia) | MF | Soltmurad Bakayev | 1 | 0 | 0 | 0 | 0 | 0 | 1 | 0 |
| | | | TOTALS | 89 | 4 | 16 | 1 | 7 | 0 | 112 | 5 |
