= Aleksandr Maksimenko (footballer, born 1998) =

Russian footballer

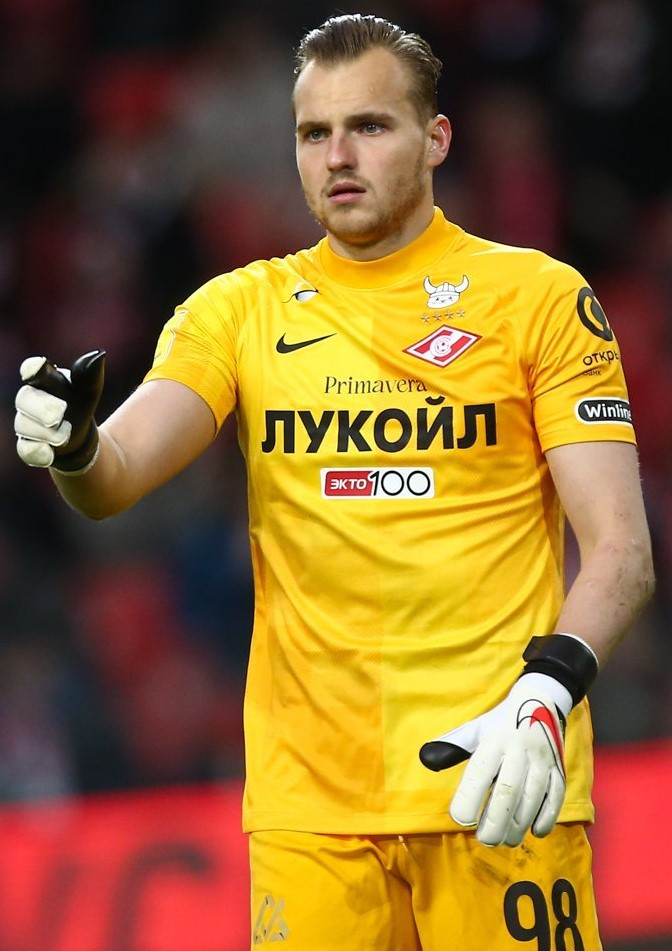
- Maksimenko with Spartak Moscow in 2022

Personal information
- Full name: Aleksandr Vladimirovich Maksimenko
- Date of birth: 19 March 1998 (age 28)
- Place of birth: Rostov-on-Don, Russia
- Height: 1.90 m (6 ft 3 in)
- Position: Goalkeeper

Team information
- Current team: Spartak Moscow
- Number: 98

Youth career
- 2007–2011: Lokomotiv Rostov-on-Don
- 2011–2013: Viktor Ponedelnik Academy
- 2013–2016: Spartak Moscow

Senior career*
Years	Team	Apps	(Gls)
2016–2018	Spartak-2 Moscow	24	(0)
2016–	Spartak Moscow	194	(0)

International career^{‡}
2015	Russia U17	22	(0)
2015–2016	Russia U18	7	(0)
2016	Russia U19	6	(0)
2018–2021	Russia U21	13	(0)
2024–	Russia	6	(0)
- * Club domestic league appearances and goals as of 8 November 2026 ‡ National team caps and goals as of 6 October 2026

Aleksandr Vladimirovich Maksimenko (Russian: Александр Владимирович Максименко; born 19 March 1998) is a Russian football player who plays for Spartak Moscow and the Russia national team.

== Club career ==
Maksimenko made his debut in the Russian Football National League for Spartak-2 Moscow on 13 August 2016 in a game against Tyumen. He made his debut for the main Spartak squad on 25 October 2017 in a Russian Cup game against Spartak Nalchik. He made his debut in the Russian Premier League for Spartak Moscow on 28 July 2018 in a game against Orenburg.

Maksimienko became the starting Spartak goalkeeper after that in the beginning of the 2018–19 season over Artyom Rebrov as Aleksandr Selikhov was suffering from a tendon injury, and later became the joint-first choice keeper along with Selikhov.

Maksimenko won the Russian Cup in 2022.

In 2025, as Selikhov left Spartak, Maksimienko became the sole first-choice goalkeeper.

Maksimenko again won the Russian Cup in 2026.

== International career ==
He played in the 2015 UEFA European Under-17 Championship and 2015 FIFA U-17 World Cup for Russia national under-17 football team.

On 11 May 2021, he was named as a back-up player for the Russia's UEFA Euro 2020 squad.

Maksimenko made his senior team debut on 7 June 2024 in a friendly against Belarus, coming on as a half-time substitute in a 4–0 Russian victory.

== Career statistics ==
=== Club ===
As of match played 8 November 2026

Appearances and goals by club, season and competition
Club	Season	League			Cup		Europe		Other		Total	
Club	Season	Division	Apps	Goals	Apps	Goals	Apps	Goals	Apps	Goals	Apps	Goals
Spartak-2 Moscow	2015–16	Russian First League	0	0	—		—		2 (Note: Appearances in the FNL Cup)	0	2	0
Spartak-2 Moscow	2016–17	Russian First League	4	0	—		—		2	0	6	0
Spartak-2 Moscow	2017–18	Russian First League	20	0	—		—		—		20	0
Spartak-2 Moscow	Total		24	0	—		—		4	0	28	0
Spartak Moscow	2015–16	Russian Premier League	0	0	0	0	—		—		0	0
Spartak Moscow	2016–17	Russian Premier League	0	0	0	0	0	0	—		0	0
Spartak Moscow	2017–18	Russian Premier League	0	0	1	0	0	0	—		1	0
Spartak Moscow	2018–19	Russian Premier League	23	0	1	0	8 (Note: Two appearances in the UEFA Champions League, six appearances in the UEFA Europa League)	0	—		32	0
Spartak Moscow	2019–20	Russian Premier League	29	0	3	0	4 (Note: Appearances in the UEFA Europa League)	0	—		36	0
Spartak Moscow	2020–21	Russian Premier League	29	0	2	0	—		—		31	0
Spartak Moscow	2021–22	Russian Premier League	16	0	4	0	5 (Note: Two appearances in the UEFA Champions League, three appearances in the UEFA Europa League)	0	—		25	0
Spartak Moscow	2022–23	Russian Premier League	3	0	11	0	—		0	0	14	0
Spartak Moscow	2023–24	Russian Premier League	24	0	5	0	—		—		29	0
Spartak Moscow	2024–25	Russian Premier League	27	0	4	0	—		—		31	0
Spartak Moscow	2025–26	Russian Premier League	30	0	5	0	—		—		35	0
Spartak Moscow	2026–27	Russian Premier League	13	0	0	0	—		1 (Note: Appearance in Russian Super Cup)	0	14	0
Spartak Moscow	Total		194	0	36	0	17	0	1	0	248	0
Career total			218	0	36	0	17	0	5	0	276	0

=== International ===
As of match played 6 October 2026

Appearances and goals by national team and year
National team	Year	Apps	Goals
Russia	2024	2	0
Russia	2025	2	0
Russia	2026	2	0
Total		6	0

== Honours ==
Spartak Moscow

- Russian Cup: 2021–22, 2025–26
