= Dmitri Markitesov =

Russian footballer

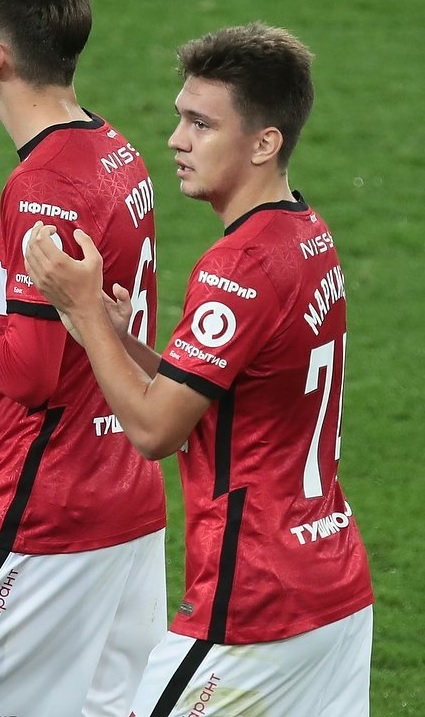
- Markitesov with Spartak Moscow in 2020

Personal information
- Full name: Dmitri Valeryevich Markitesov
- Date of birth: 22 March 2001 (age 25)
- Place of birth: Moscow, Russia
- Height: 1.80 m (5 ft 11 in)
- Position: Midfielder

Team information
- Current team: SKA-Khabarovsk
- Number: 8

Youth career
- 2007–2020: Spartak Moscow

Senior career*
| Years | Team | Apps | (Gls) |
| 2019–2022 | Spartak-2 Moscow | 75 | (9) |
| 2020–2022 | Spartak Moscow | 9 | (0) |
| 2022–2023 | Rodina Moscow | 2 | (0) |
| 2023–2026 | Rodina-2 Moscow | 77 | (5) |
| 2024–2025 | Rodina Moscow | 14 | (0) |
| 2026– | SKA-Khabarovsk | 0 | (0) |

International career^{‡}
| 2016–2017 | Russia U16 | 10 | (2) |
| 2017–2018 | Russia U17 | 12 | (5) |
| 2019 | Russia U18 | 3 | (0) |
- * Club domestic league appearances and goals as of 13 June 2026 ‡ National team caps and goals as of 9 June 2019

Dmitri Valeryevich Markitesov (Russian: Дмитрий Валерьевич Маркитесов; born 22 March 2001) is a Russian football player who plays as a central midfielder or left winger for SKA-Khabarovsk.

== Club career ==
He made his debut in the Russian Football National League for Spartak-2 Moscow on 11 March 2019 in a game against Zenit-2 St. Petersburg.

He made his Russian Premier League debut for Spartak Moscow on 27 June 2020 in a game against Ufa, replacing Roman Zobnin in the 90th minute.

On 15 July 2022, Markitesov signed a three-year contract with Rodina Moscow.

== Career statistics ==
As of 8 June 2024

| Club | Season | League | | | Cup | | Continental | | Other | | Total | |
| Club | Season | Division | Apps | Goals | Apps | Goals | Apps | Goals | Apps | Goals | Apps | Goals |
|---|---|---|---|---|---|---|---|---|---|---|---|---|
| Spartak-2 Moscow | 2018–19 | Russian First League | 6 | 0 | – | | – | | 5 (Note: Appearances in the FNL Cup) | 2 | 11 | 2 |
| Spartak-2 Moscow | 2019–20 | Russian First League | 23 | 2 | – | | – | | – | | 23 | 2 |
| Spartak-2 Moscow | 2020–21 | Russian First League | 16 | 2 | – | | – | | – | | 16 | 2 |
| Spartak-2 Moscow | 2021–22 | Russian First League | 30 | 5 | – | | – | | – | | 30 | 5 |
| Spartak-2 Moscow | Total | | 75 | 9 | 0 | 0 | 0 | 0 | 5 | 2 | 80 | 11 |
| Spartak Moscow | 2019–20 | Russian Premier League | 2 | 0 | 0 | 0 | 0 | 0 | – | | 2 | 0 |
| Spartak Moscow | 2020–21 | Russian Premier League | 6 | 0 | 2 | 0 | – | | – | | 8 | 0 |
| Spartak Moscow | 2021–22 | Russian Premier League | 1 | 0 | 0 | 0 | 0 | 0 | – | | 1 | 0 |
| Spartak Moscow | Total | | 9 | 0 | 2 | 0 | 0 | 0 | 0 | 0 | 11 | 0 |
| Rodina Moscow | 2022–23 | Russian First League | 2 | 0 | 0 | 0 | – | | – | | 2 | 0 |
| Rodina-2 Moscow | 2023–24 | Russian Second League A | 30 | 2 | – | | – | | – | | 30 | 2 |
| Rodina Moscow | 2023–24 | Russian First League | 2 | 0 | 0 | 0 | – | | – | | 2 | 0 |
| Career total | | | 118 | 11 | 2 | 0 | 0 | 0 | 5 | 2 | 125 | 13 |
