= Jordan Larsson =

Swedish footballer (born 1997)

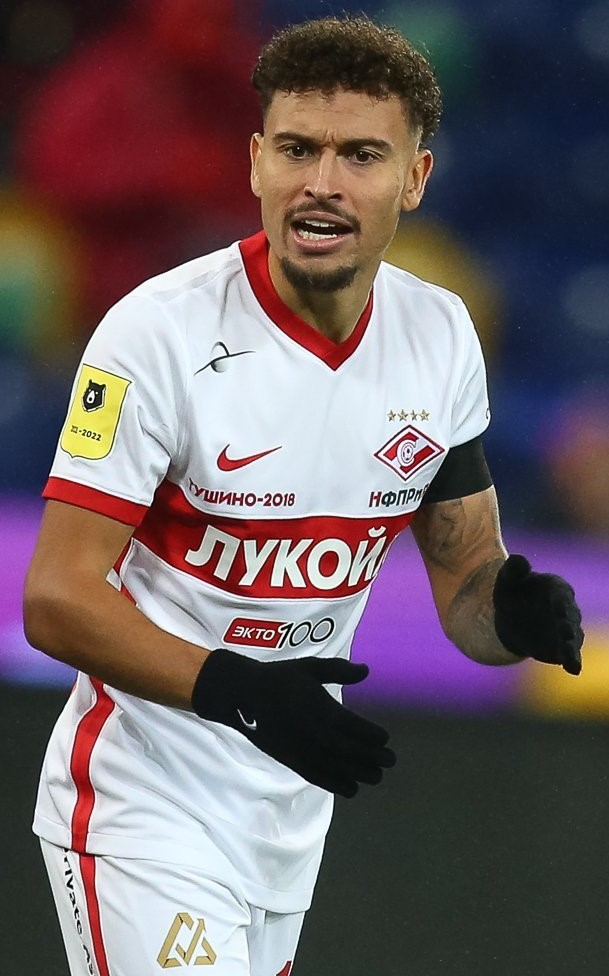
- Larsson with Spartak Moscow in 2021

Personal information
- Full name: Carl Henrik Jordan Larsson
- Date of birth: 20 June 1997 (age 29)
- Place of birth: Rotterdam, Netherlands
- Height: 1.75 m (5 ft 9 in)
- Position: Forward

Team information
- Current team: Al-Ettifaq
- Number: 17

Youth career
- 2004–2006: Barcelona
- 2006–2012: Högaborgs BK

Senior career*
Years	Team	Apps	(Gls)
2012–2014	Högaborgs BK	43	(12)
2014–2016	Helsingborgs IF	61	(10)
2017–2018	NEC	21	(4)
2018–2019	IFK Norrköping	42	(12)
2019–2022	Spartak Moscow	72	(22)
2022	→ AIK (loan)	11	(3)
2022–2023	Schalke 04	11	(0)
2023	→ Copenhagen (loan)	12	(4)
2023–2026	Copenhagen	76	(24)
2026–	Al-Ettifaq	5	(1)

International career^{‡}
2012–2014	Sweden U17	15	(2)
2014–2016	Sweden U19	15	(1)
2016–2018	Sweden U21	14	(2)
2018–	Sweden	8	(1)
- * Club domestic league appearances and goals as of 11 September 2026 ‡ National team caps and goals as of 23:12, 20 June 2025 (UTC)

Carl Henrik Jordan Larsson (born 20 June 1997) is a professional footballer who plays as a forward for Saudi Pro League club Al-Ettifaq. Born in the Netherlands, he plays for the Sweden national team.

Starting his career with Högaborgs BK in Sweden in the early 2010s, Larsson represented Helsingborgs IF, NEC Nijmegen and IFK Norrköping before joining Spartak Moscow in 2019. After the Russian invasion of Ukraine, he left the team, playing for AIK, Schalke 04 and Copenhagen. He made his full international debut for the Sweden national team in 2018 and was a squad member at UEFA Euro 2020.

== Early life ==
Larsson is the son of Swedish footballer Henrik Larsson. He was born in Rotterdam, Netherlands, while his father was playing for Feyenoord. He is of Cape Verdean descent through his paternal grandfather.

== Club career ==
=== Early career ===
While his father, Henrik Larsson, played for FC Barcelona, Larsson played for Barcelona's La Masia academy. He began his senior career at Högaborgs BK in the Swedish Football Division 2, the fourth level of the sport in the country. On 19 June 2013, in a match against Tenhults IF, 15-year-old Larsson played alongside his 41-year-old father, who was making a comeback due to an injury crisis at Högaborg.

Aged 16 in January 2014, Larsson was tracked by another of his father's former employers, Manchester United. Instead, he signed a four-year deal for the city's main club Helsingborgs IF, the same transfer that his father had made 22 years prior.

=== Helsingborgs IF ===
Larsson made his first team debut in the Allsvenskan on 27 July 2014, coming on as a substitute for Mattias Lindström in the 73rd minute of a 1–1 home draw against Örebro SK. On 26 August, he made his first start away to Division 2 team Torslanda IK in the second round of the Svenska Cupen, scoring in each half of a 4–1 away win. That November, his father took over as the team's manager, and assured the public that he would not practise nepotism. The following 4 March in the group stage of the competition, Larsson opened a 2–2 draw against Superettan team Syrianska FC with a goal that received attention abroad for the quality of its technique, reminiscent of his father.

Larsson scored his first league goal for Helsingborg on 6 June 2015 in the second minute of a 3–0 win against Åtvidabergs FF, two weeks before his 18th birthday. On 19 July, he added two more in a 3–1 win over AIK at Olympia, and a further two on 20 August in an 8–1 win at fifth-tier Lunden ÖBK in the second round of the cup, which led to interest from IFK Göteborg.

After Helsingborg lost their relegation play-off to Halmstads BK in November 2016, Larsson, who scored a late goal that would have kept them up, was attacked by hooligans from his own team, who rushed onto the pitch and tore off his shirt. His father subsequently planned to send him on holiday for his protection.

=== NEC ===
On 2 January 2017, Larsson transferred from Helsingborg to the Dutch Eredivisie as his father did in 1993, and signed for NEC. He made his debut eleven days later in a 1–0 win at Willem II, replacing Kévin Mayi after 59 minutes. He scored his first goals in Dutch football on 18 August, one in each half of a 3–1 home win over Almere City FC in the first game of the season. NEC finished the season with relegation to the Eerste Divisie via the play-offs.

=== IFK Norrköping ===
Larsson returned to the Allsvenskan on 2 January 2018, when he signed a three-year deal with IFK Norrköping. Mainly a substitute in his first season back in the league, he scored just once, in a 3–1 win over Kalmar FF on 15 April. Two weeks later he was sent off as the VitBlå suffered a first home defeat of the season to Trelleborgs FF, for a high challenge on Robin Nilsson. On 23 August, in the second round of the Svenska Cupen, he scored a hat-trick in a 10–0 win at sixth-tier Brottby SK.

In July 2019, in his first European tie, Larsson scored in a 2–1 (4–1 aggregate) win over Ireland's St Patrick's Athletic in the first qualifying round of the UEFA Europa League.

=== Spartak Moscow ===
On 2 August 2019, Russian Premier League club FC Spartak Moscow announced the signing of Larsson for around €4 million.

He scored his first goal for Spartak on 25 August in a game against PFC Krylia Sovetov Samara. On 27 October 2019, he scored twice after coming on as a substitute in the second half in a 3–0 victory over FC Lokomotiv Moscow.

==== Loan to AIK and release by Spartak ====
In March 2022, FIFA introduced special regulations related to the Russian invasion of Ukraine. The regulations allow foreign players in Russia to suspend their contracts until the end of the 2021–22 season and sign with a club outside of Russia until that date. On 4 April 2022, Larsson used the new rule to join AIK on a short-term deal, one of the only Spartak players to do so.

He made his debut for the club six days later in the home premiere against IFK Norrköping. Larsson went straight into the starting eleven and made an assist after 15 minutes when he lifted the ball from a corner to Alexander Milošević who scored the match's only goal. He scored his first goal for the club on 1 May 2022 during an away match against GIF Sundsvall which ended in a 2–0 victory.

He scored the second goal for the club on 21 May 2022 in a 2–2 draw against IK Sirius at Friends Arena. The following match, Larsson scored the decisive goal against his old club Helsingborgs IF at Olympia, which AIK won 2–1. He played his last match for the club on 26 June 2022 when he played 61 minutes of a 1–1 draw against Degerfors IF. During his time at the club, he produced 3 goals and 2 assists in 11 Allsvenskan matches.

On 27 June 2022, Larsson's contract with Spartak was terminated by mutual consent.

=== Schalke 04 ===
On 5 August 2022, Schalke 04 signed him on a free transfer until the end of the 2024–25 season.

=== Copenhagen ===
On 28 January 2023, Larsson joined Copenhagen in Denmark on loan for the rest of the 2022–23 season. On 13 June 2023, the move was made permanent.

== International career ==
On 7 October 2015, in the first game of 2016 UEFA European Under-19 Championship qualification in Sint-Niklaas, Belgium, Larsson assisted and then was assisted by Gustaf Nilsson as Sweden won 2–0 against Belarus. They advanced from the qualifying round but were eliminated in the elite round.

He made his under-21 debut on 3 June 2016, coming on in added time for Arber Zeneli and scoring the winner in a 3–2 victory over Georgia at Rimnersvallen, in qualification for the 2017 European Championship.

Larsson was one of three forwards chosen by coach Håkan Ericson for the team at the 2016 Olympics in Brazil. However, he was withdrawn by his father and club manager, as Helsingborg only had one other striker available.

On 7 January 2018, he made his debut for the senior national team playing 64 minutes in a 1–1 friendly draw with Estonia in Abu Dhabi. Two years and two days later he scored his first international goal, the only one of a friendly win against Moldova in Qatar.

Larsson was called up for a major tournament for the first time when he was included in Sweden's 26-man squad for UEFA Euro 2020.

== Career statistics ==
=== Club ===
As of match played 24 October 2026

Appearances and goals by club, season and competition
Club	Season	League			National cup (Note: Includes Svenska Cupen, KNVB Cup, Russian Cup, DFB-Pokal, Danish Cup)		Continental		Other		Total	
Club	Season	Division	Apps	Goals	Apps	Goals	Apps	Goals	Apps	Goals	Apps	Goals
Högaborg	2012	Division 2 Södra	10	5	–		–		–		10	5
Högaborg	2013	Division 2 Västra	19	6	–		–		–		19	6
Högaborg	2014	Division 2 Västra	14	1	–		–		–		14	1
Högaborg	Total		43	12	–		–		–		43	12
Helsingborg	2014	Allsvenskan	9	0	5	3	–		–		14	3
Helsingborg	2015	Allsvenskan	25	3	4	3	–		–		29	6
Helsingborg	2016	Allsvenskan	27	7	1	1	–		2 (Note: Appearances in Allsvenskan relegation play-offs)	1	30	9
Helsingborg	Total		61	10	10	7	–		2	1	73	18
NEC	2016–17	Eredivisie	8	0	0	0	–		1 (Note: Appearance in Eredivisie relegation play-offs)	0	9	0
NEC	2017–18	Eerste Divisie	13	4	2	0	–		–		15	4
NEC	Total		21	4	2	0	–		1	0	24	4
IFK Norrköping	2018	Allsvenskan	26	1	4	3	–		–		30	4
IFK Norrköping	2019	Allsvenskan	16	11	3	3	2 (Note: Appearances in UEFA Europa League)	1	–		21	15
IFK Norrköping	Total		42	12	7	6	2	1	–		51	19
Spartak Moscow	2019–20	Russian Premier League	26	7	4	3	–		–		30	10
Spartak Moscow	2020–21	Russian Premier League	29	15	1	0	–		–		30	15
Spartak Moscow	2021–22	Russian Premier League	17	0	1	1	5 (Note: Two appearances in UEFA Champions League, three appearances, one goal in UEFA Europa League)	1	–		23	2
Spartak Moscow	Total		72	22	6	4	5	1	–		83	27
AIK (loan)	2022	Allsvenskan	11	3	–		–		–		11	3
Schalke 04	2022–23	Bundesliga	11	0	1	0	–		–		12	0
Copenhagen (loan)	2022–23	Danish Superliga	12	4	4	2	–		–		16	6
Copenhagen	2023–24	Danish Superliga	23	3	3	0	11 (Note: Appearances in UEFA Champions League)	3	–		37	6
Copenhagen	2024–25	Danish Superliga	19	8	5	1	9 (Note: Appearances in UEFA Conference League)	1	–		33	10
Copenhagen	2025–26	Danish Superliga	33	13	7	0	14	3	–		54	16
Copenhagen	2026–27	Danish Superliga	1	0	0	0	1	0	–		2	0
Copenhagen	Total		88	28	19	3	35	7	–		142	38
Al-Ettifaq	2026–27	Saudi Pro League	8	1	0	0	–		1 (Note: Appearance in GFF Gulf Club Champions League)	1	9	2
Career total			355	92	45	20	42	9	4	2	447	123

=== International ===
As of match played on 10 June 2025

Appearances and goals by national team and year
National team	Year	Apps	Goals
Sweden	2018	2	0
Sweden	2019	0	0
Sweden	2020	3	1
Sweden	2021	2	0
Sweden	2022	0	0
Sweden	2023	0	0
Sweden	2024	0	0
Sweden	2025	1	0
Total		8	1

Scores and results list Sweden's goal tally first, score column indicates score after each Larsson goal.

List of international goals scored by Jordan Larsson
No.	Date	Venue	Opponent	Score	Result	Competition
1	9 January 2020	Hamad bin Khalifa Stadium, Doha, Qatar	Moldova	1–0	1–0	Friendly

== Honours ==
Spartak Moscow

- Russian Cup: 2021–22

Copenhagen

- Danish Superliga: 2022–23 2024–25
- Danish Cup: 2022–23 2024–25

Individual

- Danish Superliga Player of the Month: May 2025
- Danish Superliga Goal of the Month: August 2025
