= Pavel Maslov =

Russian footballer

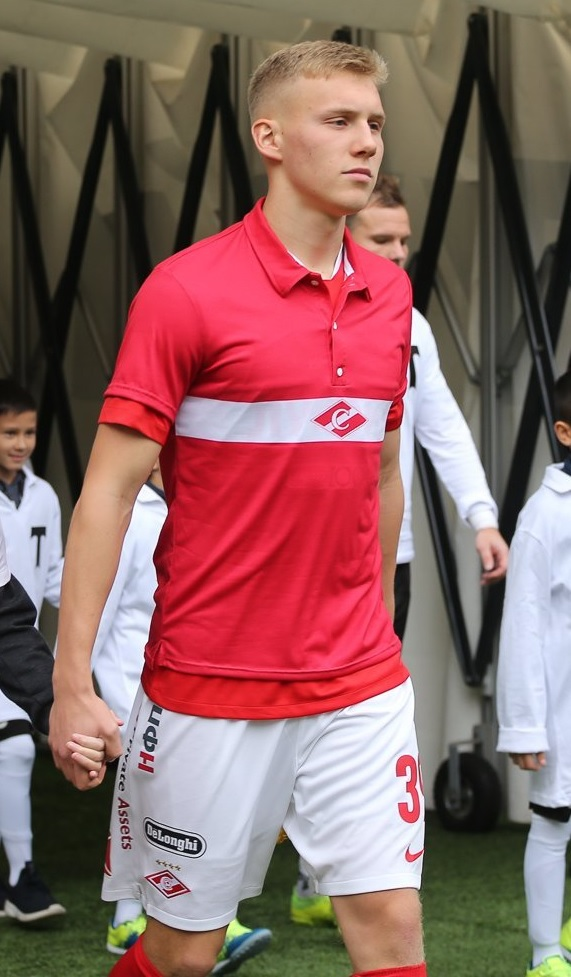
- Maslov with Spartak-2 Moscow in 2019

Personal information
- Full name: Pavel Yevgenyevich Maslov
- Date of birth: 14 April 2000 (age 26)
- Place of birth: Tyumen, Russia
- Height: 1.84 m (6 ft 0 in)
- Positions: Right-back; centre-back

Youth career
- –2011: FC Tyumen
- 2011–2015: PFC CSKA Moscow

Senior career*
Years	Team	Apps	(Gls)
2016–2018	FC Tyumen	52	(0)
2018–2019	FC Spartak-2 Moscow	49	(2)
2018–2025	FC Spartak Moscow	58	(1)
2024–2025	→ PFC Sochi (loan)	18	(2)
2025–2026	Chayka Peschanokopskoye	10	(0)

International career^{‡}
2017–2018	Russia U-18	2	(0)
2018–2019	Russia U-19	10	(1)
2019	Russia U-20	3	(0)
2020–2021	Russia U-21	7	(0)
- * Club domestic league appearances and goals as of 29 November 2025 ‡ National team caps and goals as of 28 March 2021

Pavel Yevgenyevich Maslov (Russian: Павел Евгеньевич Маслов; born 14 April 2000) is a Russian football player who plays as a defender.

== Club career ==
He made his debut in the Russian Football National League for FC Tyumen on 16 March 2016 in a game against FC Baikal Irkutsk.

On 13 June 2018, he signed with FC Spartak Moscow. He made his debut for the main squad of FC Spartak Moscow on 26 September 2018 in a Russian Cup game against FC Chernomorets Novorossiysk. He made his Russian Premier League debut on 14 March 2020 when he started the game against FC Orenburg.

On 12 September 2024, Maslov was loaned by PFC Sochi.

== Personal life ==
He is a son of Yevgeni Maslov.

== Career statistics ==
As of match played 14 August 2024

Appearances and goals by club, season and competition
Club	Season	League			Cup		Europe		Other		Total	
Club	Season	Division	Apps	Goals	Apps	Goals	Apps	Goals	Apps	Goals	Apps	Goals
Tyumen	2015–16	Russian Football National League	7	0	0	0	—		1 (Note: Appearances in the FNL Cup)	0	8	0
Tyumen	2016–17	Russian Football National League	16	0	1	0	—		3	0	20	0
Tyumen	2017–18	Russian Football National League	29	0	1	0	—		4	0	34	0
Tyumen	Total		52	0	2	0	—		8	0	62	0
Spartak-2 Moscow	2018–19	Russian Football National League	28	1	—		—		4	1	32	2
Spartak-2 Moscow	2019–20	Russian Football National League	21	1	—		—		—		21	1
Spartak-2 Moscow	Total		49	2	—		—		4	1	53	3
Spartak Moscow	2018–19	Russian Premier League	0	0	1	0	0	0	—		1	0
Spartak Moscow	2019–20	Russian Premier League	9	0	1	0	0	0	—		10	0
Spartak Moscow	2020–21	Russian Premier League	25	0	3	0	—		—		28	0
Spartak Moscow	2021–22	Russian Premier League	0	0	0	0	0	0	—		0	0
Spartak Moscow	2022–23	Russian Premier League	19	1	8	0	—		—		27	1
Spartak Moscow	2023–24	Russian Premier League	4	0	5	0	—		—		9	0
Spartak Moscow	2024–25	Russian Premier League	1	0	2	1	—		—		3	1
Spartak Moscow	Total		58	1	20	1	—		—		78	2
Career total			159	3	22	1	0	0	12	1	193	5
