= Yevgeni Maslov =

Russian footballer and coach

Personal information
- Full name: Yevgeni Aleksandrovich Maslov
- Date of birth: 7 April 1966 (age 60)
- Height: 1.76 m (5 ft 9 1/2 in)
- Position: Defender

Team information
- Current team: FC Tyumen (assistant manager)

Senior career*
Years	Team	Apps	(Gls)
1984–1995	FC Dynamo-Gazovik Tyumen	252	(17)
1996–1997	FC Irtysh Tobolsk	63	(0)
1998–2002	FC Tyumen	146	(4)

Managerial career
- 2008: FC Tyumen-2 Tyumen
- 2011–: FC Tyumen (assistant)
- 2017: FC Tyumen (caretaker)
- * Club domestic league appearances and goals

Yevgeni Aleksandrovich Maslov (Russian: Евгений Александрович Маслов; born 7 April 1966) is a Russian professional football coach and a former player. He is the assistant manager for FC Tyumen.

== Club career ==
He made his professional debut in the Soviet Second League in 1984 for FC Geolog Tyumen.

== Personal life ==
He is the father of Pavel Maslov.
