= Malcolm Badu =

German footballer (born 1997)

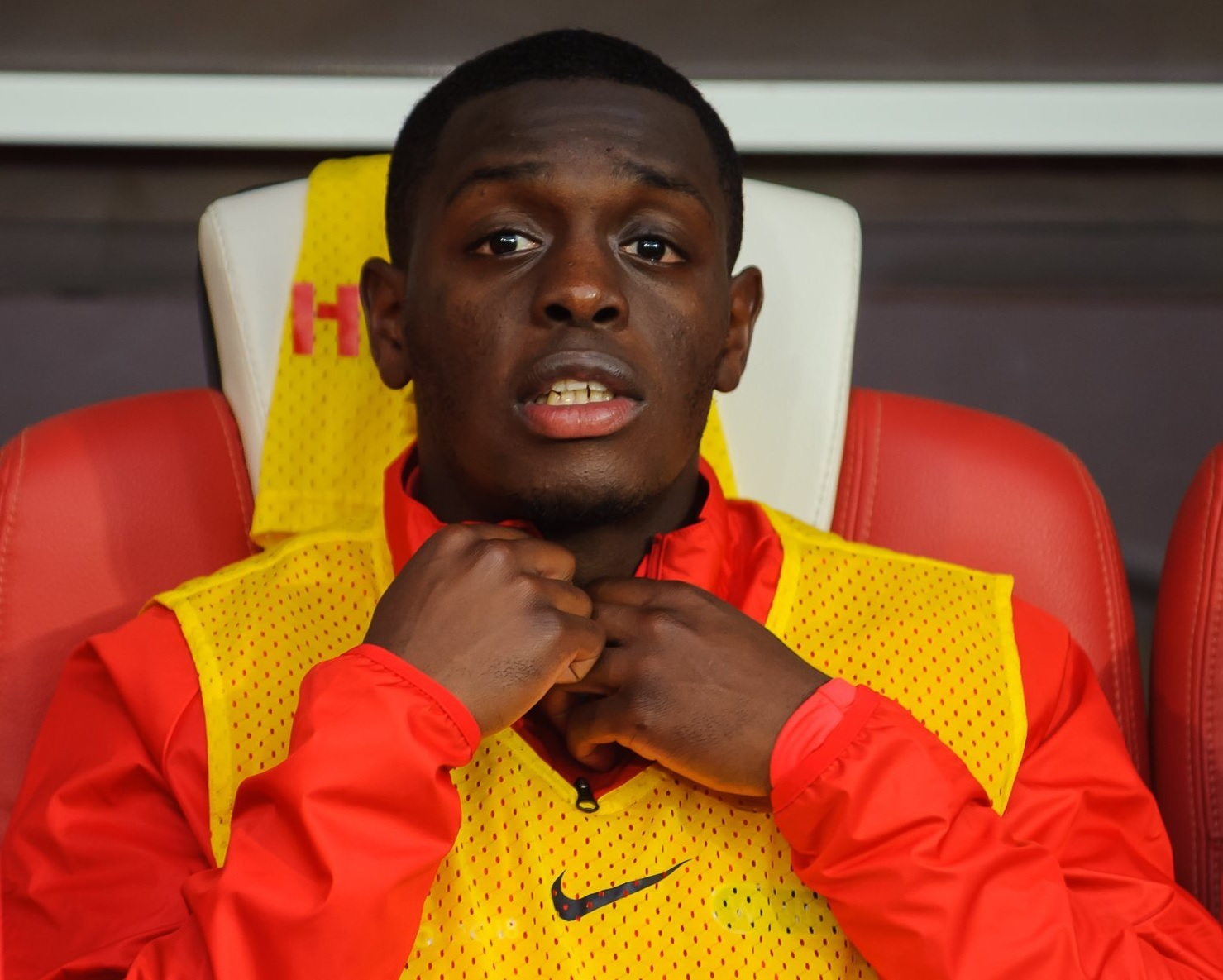
- Badu with Spartak Moscow in 2019

Personal information
- Full name: Kentu Malcolm Badu
- Date of birth: 23 June 1997 (age 29)
- Place of birth: Berlin, Germany
- Height: 1.71 m (5 ft 7 in)
- Position: Defensive midfielder

Team information
- Current team: Lupo Martini Wolfsburg

Youth career
- 2006–2011: SV Empor Berlin
- 2011–2016: VfL Wolfsburg

Senior career*
Years	Team	Apps	(Gls)
2016–2019	VfL Wolfsburg II	57	(3)
2019–2021	Spartak Moscow	0	(0)
2019–2021	→ Spartak-2 Moscow	24	(1)
2021–2023	Energie Cottbus	54	(12)
2023–2024	Rot-Weiß Erfurt	24	(3)
2024–	Lupo Martini Wolfsburg	17	(1)

International career^{‡}
2014–2015	Germany U18	6	(0)
2015	Germany U19	2	(1)
2016–2017	Germany U20	8	(2)
- * Club domestic league appearances and goals as of 14 September 2025 ‡ National team caps and goals as of 31 May 2017

Kentu Malcolm Badu, known as Malcolm Badu (born 23 June 1997) is a German professional footballer who plays as a defensive midfielder for Oberliga Niedersachsen club Lupo Martini Wolfsburg.

== Club career ==
After beginning his club career in the lower German divisions, Badu signed with the Russian Premier League club FC Spartak Moscow on 10 July 2019.

He made his debut in the Russian Football National League for FC Spartak-2 Moscow on 24 July 2019 in a game against FC Nizhny Novgorod.

In January 2021, his contract with Spartak was terminated by mutual consent.

Badu joined Regionalliga Nordost club Energie Cottbus in July 2021, following a trial.

== International career ==
Badu represented Germany at the 2017 FIFA U-20 World Cup.
