= Maksim Sazonov =

Russian footballer

Personal information
- Full name: Maksim Anatolyevich Sazonov
- Date of birth: 2 April 2000 (age 26)
- Place of birth: Yelets, Russia
- Height: 1.76 m (5 ft 9 in)
- Position: Defender

Youth career
- –2011: FC Yelets
- 2012–2015: FC Spartak Moscow
- 2015–2016: FC Dynamo Moscow
- 2016–2019: FC Spartak Moscow

Senior career*
| Years | Team | Apps | (Gls) |
| 2019–2020 | FC Spartak-2 Moscow | 21 | (0) |
| 2021–2023 | FC Metallurg Lipetsk | 40 | (1) |

International career^{‡}
| 2017 | Russia U18 | 3 | (0) |
- * Club domestic league appearances and goals as of 10 June 2023 ‡ National team caps and goals as of 26 August 2017

Maksim Anatolyevich Sazonov (Russian: Максим Анатольевич Сазонов; born 2 April 2000) is a Russian football player.

== Club career ==
He made his debut in the Russian Football National League for FC Spartak-2 Moscow on 20 April 2019 in a game against FC Mordovia Saransk.
