= Ivan Repyakh =

Russian footballer

Personal information
- Full name: Ivan Igorevich Repyakh
- Date of birth: 18 October 2001 (age 25)
- Place of birth: Krasnodar, Russia
- Height: 1.68 m (5 ft 6 in)
- Position: Midfielder

Youth career
- –2016: Krasnodar
- 2016–2020: Spartak Moscow
- 2020: Vejle

Senior career*
| Years | Team | Apps | (Gls) |
| 2018–2020 | Spartak-2 Moscow | 1 | (0) |
| 2020–2022 | Vejle | 1 | (0) |
| 2022 | SKA Rostov-on-Don | 13 | (2) |
| 2023 | Kuban Krasnodar | 0 | (0) |
| 2023–2024 | Spartak Tambov | 14 | (0) |
| 2024 | Leon Saturn Ramenskoye | 9 | (0) |

International career
| 2016 | Russia U15 | 4 | (2) |
| 2016–2017 | Russia U16 | 6 | (1) |
| 2018 | Russia U17 | 4 | (2) |
| 2018 | Russia U18 | 3 | (0) |
- * Club domestic league appearances and goals as of 3 November 2024

Ivan Igorevich Repyakh (Russian: Иван Игоревич Репях; born 18 October 2001) is a Russian professional footballer who plays as a midfielder.

== Club career ==
He made his debut in the Russian Football National League for FC Spartak-2 Moscow on 14 November 2018 in a game against FC Sibir Novosibirsk.

On 24 September 2020, Repyakh signed with Danish Superliga club Vejle. His contract was terminated on 20 January 2022 after making two appearances for the club.
