= Artyom Rebrov =

Russian footballer

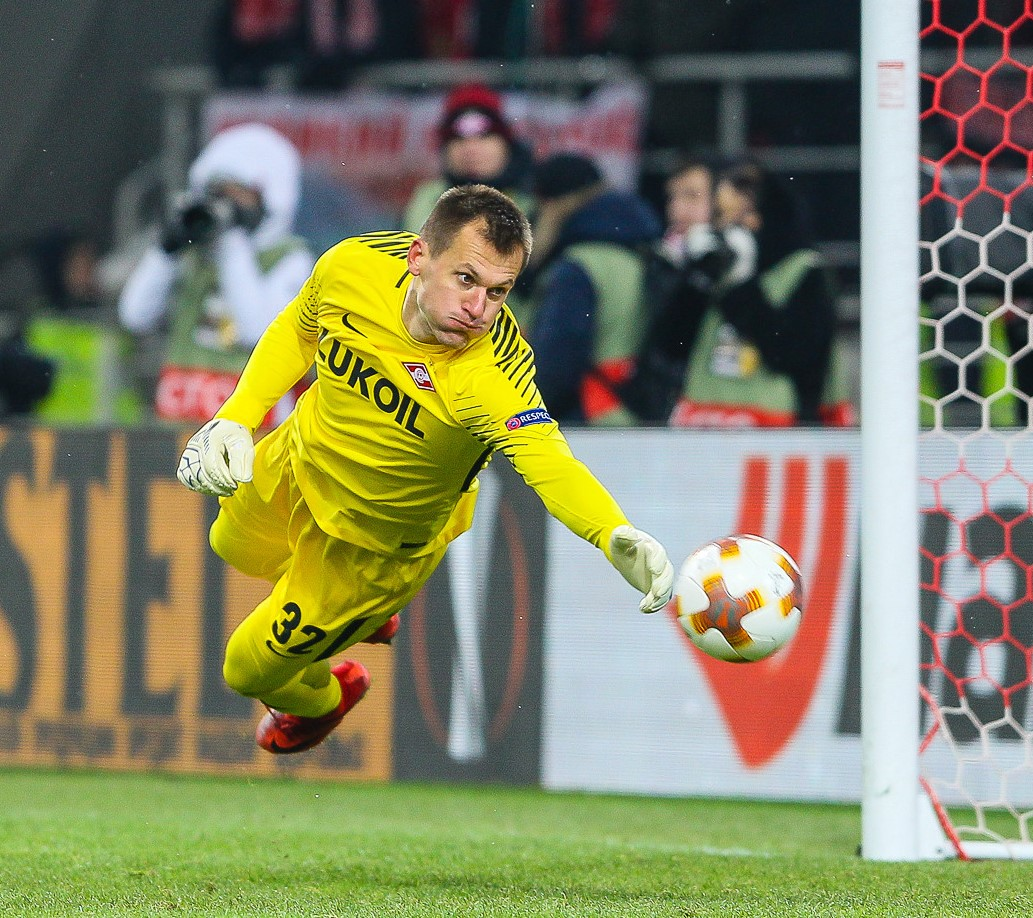
- Rebrov with Spartak Moscow in 2018

Personal information
- Full name: Artyom Gennadyevich Rebrov
- Date of birth: 4 March 1984 (age 42)
- Place of birth: Moscow, Soviet Union
- Height: 1.93 m (6 ft 4 in)
- Position: Goalkeeper

Team information
- Current team: Spartak Moscow (technical coordinator)

Youth career
- 2001: Petrovskiy Zamok
- 2002: MEPhI Moscow

Senior career*
Years	Team	Apps	(Gls)
2003–2004	Dynamo Moscow	0	(0)
2005–2010	Saturn Moscow Oblast	8	(0)
2007	→ Avangard Kursk (loan)	7	(0)
2008	→ Saturn-2 Moscow Oblast (loan)	18	(0)
2008	→ Tom Tomsk (loan)	1	(0)
2011	Shinnik Yaroslavl	21	(0)
2011–2021	Spartak Moscow	113	(0)
Total		168	(0)

International career
2004–2006	Russia U-21	4	(0)
2015	Russia	1	(0)

Managerial career
- 2021–: Spartak Moscow (technical coordinator)
- * Club domestic league appearances and goals

Artyom Gennadyevich Rebrov (Russian: Артём Геннадьевич Ребров, born 4 March 1984) is a Russian former football goalkeeper who works as a technical coordinator at Spartak Moscow.

== Club career ==
He made his Russian Premier League debut for FC Tom Tomsk on 27 September 2008 in a game against PFC CSKA Moscow.

He gained national prominence after moving to Spartak Moscow, for which he played between 2011 and 2021. A successor to Andriy Dikan, he was the first-choice goalkeeper for different periods during the decade, including in years Spartak participated in the UEFA Champions League. He was also the team's Vice Captain.

In 2021, he retired to focus on his new role of technical coordinator, focusing on communications between Spartak's coaching staff (of which he is a key member) and the club administration. He was succeeded as goalkeeper by Aleksandr Selikhov and Alexander Maksimenko.

== Career statistics ==
As of 12 December 2021

Club	Season	League			Cup		Continental		Other		Total	
Club	Season	Division	Apps	Goals	Apps	Goals	Apps	Goals	Apps	Goals	Apps	Goals
FC Dynamo Moscow	2003	Russian Premier League	0	0	0	0	–		2 (Note: Two appearances in the Russian Premier League Cup)	0	2	0
FC Dynamo Moscow	2004	Russian Premier League	0	0	0	0	–		–		0	0
FC Dynamo Moscow	Total		0	0	0	0	0	0	2	0	2	0
FC Saturn Ramenskoye	2005	Russian Premier League	0	0	0	0	–		–		0	0
FC Saturn Ramenskoye	2006	Russian Premier League	0	0	0	0	–		–		0	0
FC Saturn Ramenskoye	2007	Russian Premier League	0	0	0	0	–		–		0	0
FC Avangard Kursk	2007	FNL	7	0	0	0	–		–		7	0
FC Saturn-2 Moscow Oblast	2008	PFL	18	0	0	0	–		–		18	0
FC Tom Tomsk	2008	Premier League	1	0	0	0	–		–		1	0
FC Saturn Ramenskoye	2009	Premier League	1	0	1	0	–		–		2	0
FC Saturn Ramenskoye	2010	Premier League	7	0	1	0	–		–		8	0
FC Saturn Ramenskoye	Total (2 spells)		8	0	2	0	0	0	0	0	10	0
FC Shinnik Yaroslavl	2011–12	FNL	21	0	2	0	–		–		23	0
FC Spartak Moscow	2011–12	Russian Premier League	8	0	1	0	–		–		9	0
FC Spartak Moscow	2012–13	Russian Premier League	4	0	1	0	2	0	–		7	0
FC Spartak Moscow	2013–14	Russian Premier League	8	0	1	0	0	0	–		9	0
FC Spartak Moscow	2014–15	Russian Premier League	28	0	1	0	–		–		29	0
FC Spartak Moscow	2015–16	Russian Premier League	24	0	2	0	–		–		26	0
FC Spartak Moscow	2016–17	Russian Premier League	28	0	0	0	2	0	–		30	0
FC Spartak Moscow	2017–18	Russian Premier League	9	0	0	0	3	0	1 (Note: One appearance in the Russian Super Cup)	0	13	0
FC Spartak Moscow	2018–19	Russian Premier League	3	0	2	0	0	0	–		5	0
FC Spartak Moscow	2019–20	Russian Premier League	1	0	1	0	0	0	–		2	0
FC Spartak Moscow	2020–21	Russian Premier League	0	0	1	0	–		–		1	0
FC Spartak Moscow	2021–22	Russian Premier League	0	0	0	0	0	0	–		0	0
FC Spartak Moscow	Total		113	0	10	0	7	0	1	0	131	0
Career total			168	0	14	0	7	0	3	0	192	0

== Club honours ==
Spartak Moscow

- Russian Premier League: 2016–17
- Russian Super Cup: 2017
