= Leonid Mironov =

Russian footballer

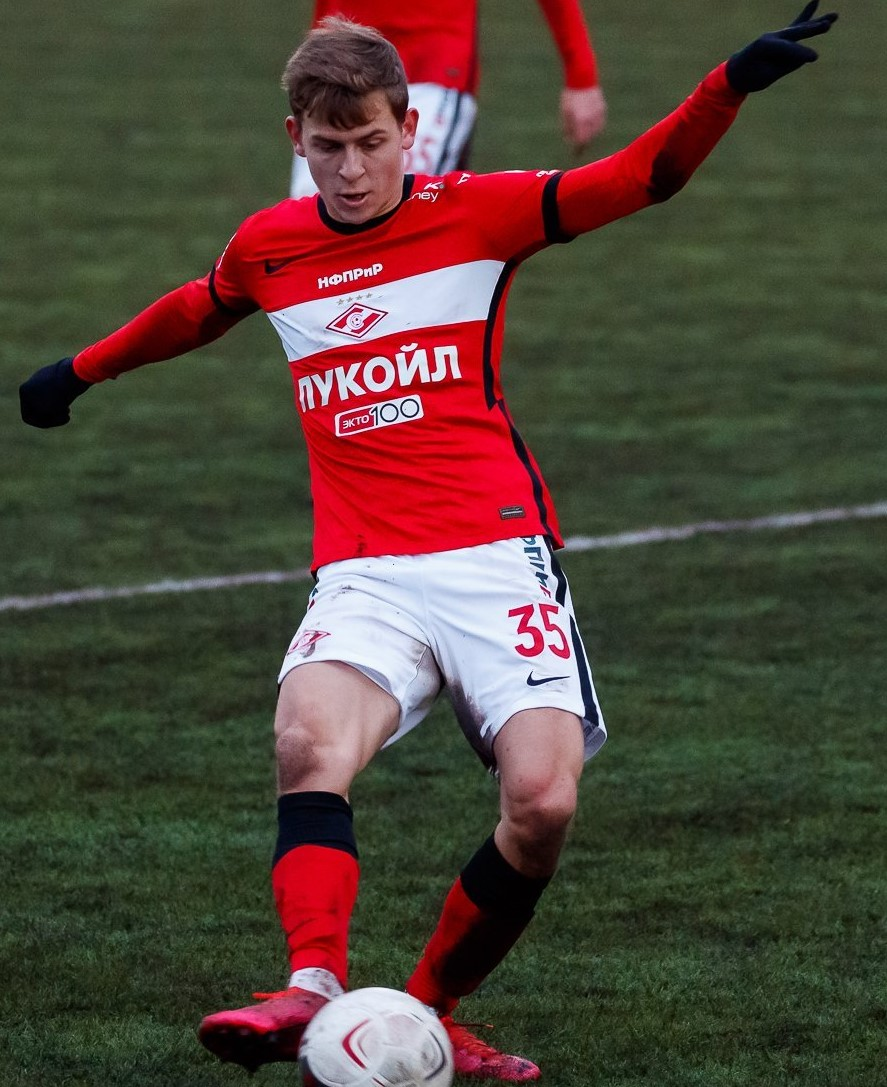

Personal information
- Full name: Leonid Vitalyevich Mironov
- Date of birth: 14 September 1998 (age 28)
- Place of birth: Zhukovsky, Russia
- Height: 1.83 m (6 ft 0 in)
- Position: Defender

Youth career
- –2010: SDYuSShOR-63 Smena Moscow
- 2010–2013: Master-Saturn Yegoryevsk
- 2013–2016: FC Spartak Moscow

Senior career*
Years	Team	Apps	(Gls)
2017–2022	FC Spartak-2 Moscow	66	(3)
2018–2020	FC Spartak Moscow	0	(0)
2022–2023	FC Novosibirsk	6	(0)
- * Club domestic league appearances and goals

Leonid Vitalyevich Mironov (Russian: Леонид Витальевич Миронов; born 14 September 1998) is a Russian former football player.

== Club career ==
He made his debut in the Russian Football National League for FC Spartak-2 Moscow on 24 March 2018 in a game against FC Luch-Energiya Vladivostok.

He made his debut for the main squad of FC Spartak Moscow on 21 October 2020 in a Russian Cup game against FC Yenisey Krasnoyarsk.
