= 2022–23 FC Spartak Moscow season =

FC Spartak Moscow
2022–23 season
- Manager: Paolo Vanoli (until 9 June); Guille Abascal (from 10 June)
- Stadium: Otkritie Arena
- Premier League: 3rd
- Russian Cup: Regions path Semi-finals Stage 2
- Top goalscorer: League: Quincy Promes (20); All: Quincy Promes (25)
| Home colours | Away colours | Third colours |

The 2022–23 season was FC Spartak Moscow's 101st season in existence and 11th consecutive in the Russian Premier League. They also competed in the Russian Cup, where they reached the Regions path Semi-finals Stage 2 before being defeated by Akron Tolyatti.

== Season events ==
On 3 June, Spartak announced that they had signed Christopher Martins permanently from Young Boys, after six-months on loan at the club, on a contract until 30 June 2026.

On 9 June, Paolo Vanoli resigned as Head Coach, with Guille Abascal being appointed as his successor on 10 June.

On 11 June, Spartak announced the signing of Maciej Rybus from Lokomotiv Moscow to a two-year contract.

On 23 June, Spartak announced the signing of Anton Zinkovsky from Krylia Sovetov to a five-year contract.

On 26 August, Spartak announced the signing of Keita Baldé from Cagliari to a three-year contract.

On 8 September, Spartak announced the signing of Miha Mevlja from Alanyaspor to a one-year contract with an option of an additional year.

On 24 January, Spartak announced the signing of Tomás Tavares from Benfica, on a contract until 30 June 2026, and the signing of Alexis Duarte from Cerro Porteño, on a contract until 30 June 2027.

On 10 February, Spartak announced that they had extended their contract with Victor Moses until the summer of 2024.

== Squad ==
As of match played 25 May 2023

| No. | Name | Nationality | Position | Date of birth (age) | Signed from | Signed in | Contract ends | Apps. | Goals |
|---|---|---|---|---|---|---|---|---|---|
| 57 | Aleksandr Selikhov | (Russia) | GK | 7 April 1994 (aged 29) | Amkar Perm | 2016 | | 82 | 0 |
| 98 | Aleksandr Maksimenko | (Russia) | GK | 23 February 1998 (aged 25) | Academy | 2014 | | 138 | 0 |
Defenders
| 4 | Alexis Duarte | (Paraguay) | DF | 12 March 2000 (aged 23) | Cerro Porteño | 2023 | 2027 | 8 | 0 |
| 5 | Leon Klassen | (Russia) | DF | 29 May 2000 (aged 22) | Tirol | 2022 | 2025 | 21 | 0 |
| 13 | Maciej Rybus | (Poland) | DF | 19 August 1989 (aged 33) | Lokomotiv Moscow | 2022 | 2024 | 11 | 1 |
| 14 | Georgi Dzhikiya | (Russia) | DF | 21 November 1993 (aged 29) | Amkar Perm | 2016 | | 202 | 4 |
| 20 | Tomás Tavares | (Portugal) | DF | 7 March 2001 (aged 22) | Benfica | 2023 | 2026 | 18 | 1 |
| 23 | Nikita Chernov | (Russia) | DF | 14 January 1996 (aged 27) | Krylia Sovetov | 2022 | 2026 | 39 | 1 |
| 39 | Pavel Maslov | (Russia) | DF | 14 April 2000 (aged 23) | Tyumen | 2018 | 2024 | 66 | 1 |
| 82 | Daniil Khlusevich | (Russia) | DF | 26 February 2001 (aged 22) | Arsenal Tula | 2021 | 2026 | 46 | 0 |
| 97 | Daniil Denisov | (Russia) | DF | 21 October 2002 (aged 20) | Academy | 2020 | | 48 | 1 |
Midfielders
| 8 | Victor Moses | (Nigeria) | MF | 12 December 1990 (aged 32) | Chelsea | 2021 | 2024 | 63 | 9 |
| 17 | Anton Zinkovsky | (Russia) | MF | 14 April 1996 (aged 27) | Krylia Sovetov | 2022 | 2027 | 36 | 3 |
| 18 | Nail Umyarov | (Russia) | MF | 27 June 2000 (aged 22) | Chertanovo Moscow | 2019 | | 96 | 1 |
| 22 | Mikhail Ignatov | (Russia) | MF | 4 May 2000 (aged 23) | Academy | 2016 | | 81 | 5 |
| 25 | Danil Prutsev | (Russia) | MF | 25 March 2000 (aged 23) | Krylia Sovetov | 2022 | 2026 | 46 | 2 |
| 35 | Christopher Martins | (Luxembourg) | MF | 19 February 1997 (aged 26) | Young Boys | 2022 | 2026 | 37 | 4 |
| 47 | Roman Zobnin | (Russia) | MF | 11 February 1994 (aged 29) | Dynamo Moscow | 2016 | | 220 | 14 |
| 68 | Ruslan Litvinov | (Russia) | MF | 18 August 2001 (aged 21) | Academy | 2018 | | 67 | 5 |
| 87 | Daniil Zorin | (Russia) | MF | 22 February 2004 (aged 19) | Academy | 2022 | | 6 | 0 |
Forwards
| 7 | Aleksandr Sobolev | (Russia) | FW | 7 March 1997 (aged 26) | Krylia Sovetov | 2020 | | 104 | 44 |
| 9 | Keita Baldé | (Senegal) | FW | 8 March 1995 (aged 28) | Cagliari | 2022 | 2024 | 16 | 3 |
| 24 | Quincy Promes | (Netherlands) | FW | 4 January 1992 (aged 31) | Ajax | 2021 | 2024 | 212 | 106 |
| 11 | Shamar Nicholson | (Jamaica) | FW | 16 March 1997 (aged 26) | Charleroi | 2022 | | 42 | 11 |
| 70 | Pavel Melyoshin | (Russia) | FW | 25 March 2004 (aged 19) | Academy | 2022 | | 17 | 3 |
Away on loan
| 3 | Maximiliano Caufriez | (Belgium) | DF | 16 February 1997 (aged 26) | Sint-Truidense | 2021 | | 26 | 0 |
| 76 | Vitali Shitov | (Russia) | MF | 7 May 2003 (aged 20) | Academy | 2020 | | 2 | 0 |
Players that left Spartak Moscow during the season
| 32 | Miha Mevlja | (Slovenia) | DF | 12 June 1990 (aged 32) | Alanyaspor | 2022 | 2023 (+1) | 7 | 0 |
| 73 | Vladislav Shitov | (Russia) | MF | 7 May 2003 (aged 20) | Youth team | 2021 | | 2 | 0 |
| 75 | Fanil Sungatulin | (Russia) | MF | 24 December 2001 (aged 21) | Youth team | 2021 | | 1 | 0 |
| 92 | Nikolai Rasskazov | (Russia) | DF | 4 January 1998 (aged 25) | Academy | 2015 | | 85 | 3 |
| | Ayrton Lucas | (Brazil) | DF | 19 June 1997 (aged 25) | Fluminense | 2018 | | 108 | 4 |

== Transfers ==
=== In ===
| Date | Position | Nationality | Name | From | Fee | Ref. |
|---|---|---|---|---|---|---|
| 3 June 2022 | MF | (Luxembourg) | Christopher Martins | Young Boys | Undisclosed | |
| 11 June 2022 | DF | (Poland) | Maciej Rybus | Lokomotiv Moscow | Undisclosed | |
| 23 June 2022 | MF | (Russia) | Anton Zinkovsky | Krylia Sovetov | Undisclosed | |
| 26 August 2022 | FW | (Senegal) | Keita Baldé | Cagliari | Undisclosed | |
| 8 September 2022 | DF | (Slovenia) | Miha Mevlja | Alanyaspor | Undisclosed | |
| 24 January 2023 | DF | (Paraguay) | Alexis Duarte | Cerro Porteño | Undisclosed | |
| 24 January 2023 | DF | (Portugal) | Tomás Tavares | Benfica | Undisclosed | |

=== Out ===
| Date | Position | Nationality | Name | To | Fee | Ref. |
|---|---|---|---|---|---|---|
| 30 May 2022 | MF | (Russia) | Ilya Gaponov | Krylia Sovetov | Undisclosed | |
| 1 June 2022 | FW | (Argentina) | Ezequiel Ponce | Elche | Undisclosed | |
| 16 June 2022 | MF | (Russia) | Reziuan Mirzov | Khimki | Undisclosed | |
| 20 June 2022 | DF | (Russia) | Ilya Detyonyshev | Chayka Peschanokopskoye | Undisclosed | |
| 21 June 2022 | FW | (Russia) | Aslan Mutaliyev | Veles Moscow | Undisclosed | |
| 23 June 2022 | MF | (Russia) | Ilyas Muminov | SKA-Khabarovsk | Undisclosed | |
| 25 June 2022 | FW | (Russia) | Maksim Glushenkov | Krylia Sovetov | Undisclosed | |
| 4 July 2022 | MF | (Netherlands) | Guus Til | PSV Eindhoven | Undisclosed | |
| 14 July 2022 | DF | (Russia) | Ilya Agapov | Pari NN | Undisclosed | |
| 15 July 2022 | DF | (Russia) | Artyom Voropayev | Rodina Moscow | Undisclosed | |
| 28 July 2022 | FW | (Georgia (country)) | Nikoloz Kutateladze | Rodez | Undisclosed | |
| 16 December 2022 | DF | (Brazil) | Ayrton Lucas | Flamengo | Undisclosed | |
| 27 January 2023 | DF | (Russia) | Nikolai Rasskazov | Krylia Sovetov | Undisclosed | |
| 31 January 2023 | DF | (Russia) | Artyom Gutsa | Tekstilshchik Ivanovo | Undisclosed | |
| 7 February 2023 | MF | (Russia) | Fanil Sungatulin | Ural Yekaterinburg | Undisclosed | |
| 23 February 2023 | FW | (Russia) | Vladislav Shitov | Krylia Sovetov | Undisclosed | |

=== Loans out ===
| Date from | Position | Nationality | Name | To | Date to | Ref. |
|---|---|---|---|---|---|---|
| 6 June 2022 | GK | (Russia) | Ilya Svinov | Fakel Voronezh | End of season | |
| 20 June 2022 | MF | (Russia) | Maksim Laykin | Neftekhimik Nizhnekamsk | End of season | |
| 21 June 2022 | MF | (Russia) | Nikita Bakalyuk | Arsenal Tula | End of season | |
| 21 June 2022 | MF | (Russia) | Fanil Sungatulin | Ural Yekaterinburg | End of season | |
| 28 June 2022 | DF | (Russia) | Ilya Golosov | Kuban Krasnodar | End of season | |
| 29 June 2022 | MF | (Russia) | Stepan Oganesyan | Orenburg | End of season | |
| 4 July 2022 | MF | (Russia) | Konstantin Shiltsov | Pari NN | End of season | |
| 7 July 2022 | DF | (Russia) | Nikolai Tolstopyatov | KAMAZ Naberezhnye Chelny | End of season | |
| 15 July 2022 | FW | (Russia) | Vladislav Shitov | Krylia Sovetov | End of season | |
| 29 August 2022 | DF | (Belgium) | Maximiliano Caufriez | Clermont | End of season | |
| 17 February 2023 | FW | (Russia) | Vitali Shitov | Zvezda St. Petersburg | 11 June 2023 | |

=== Contract suspensions ===
| Date | Position | Nationality | Name | Joined | Date | Ref. |
|---|---|---|---|---|---|---|
| 14 July 2022 | MF | (Czech Republic) | Alex Král | Schalke 04 | 30 June 2023 | |

=== Released ===
| Date | Position | Nationality | Name | Joined | Date | Ref. |
|---|---|---|---|---|---|---|
| 11 August 2022 | MF | (Netherlands) | Jorrit Hendrix | Fortuna Düsseldorf | 11 August 2022 | |
| 11 August 2022 | FW | (Brazil) | Pedro Rocha | Fortaleza | 11 August 2022 | |
| 2 September 2022 | MF | (Uzbekistan) | Oston Urunov | Ural Yekaterinburg | 2 September 2022 | |
| 18 January 2023 | DF | (Slovenia) | Miha Mevlja | | | |

== Competitions ==
=== Overall record ===
| Competition | First match | Last match | Starting round | Final position | Record | | | | | | | |
| Competition | First match | Last match | Starting round | Final position | Pld | W | D | L | GF | GA | GD | Win % |
|---|---|---|---|---|---|---|---|---|---|---|---|---|
| Premier League | 16 July 2022 | 3 June 2023 | Matchday 1 | 3rd | 30 | 15 | 9 | 6 | 60 | 38 | +22 | 50.00 |
| Russian Cup | 30 August 2022 | 19 April 2023 | Group stage | Regions path Semi-finals Stage 2 | 11 | 7 | 2 | 2 | 19 | 9 | +10 | 63.64 |
| Total | | | | | 41 | 22 | 11 | 8 | 79 | 47 | +32 | 53.66 |

Last updated: 3 June 2023
Source: Soccerway

=== Premier League ===
==== League table ====
| Pos | Team | Pld | W | D | L | GF | GA | GD | Pts |
|---|---|---|---|---|---|---|---|---|---|
| 1 | Zenit Saint Petersburg (C) | 30 | 21 | 7 | 2 | 74 | 20 | +54 | 70 |
| 2 | CSKA Moscow | 30 | 17 | 7 | 6 | 56 | 27 | +29 | 58 |
| 3 | Spartak Moscow | 30 | 15 | 9 | 6 | 60 | 38 | +22 | 54 |
| 4 | Rostov | 30 | 15 | 8 | 7 | 48 | 44 | +4 | 53 |
| 5 | Akhmat Grozny | 30 | 15 | 5 | 10 | 51 | 39 | +12 | 50 |

Source: Premier Liga
Rules for classification: 1) Points; 2) Head-to-head points; 3) Head-to-head matches won; 4) Head-to-head goal difference; 5) Head-to-head goals scored; 6) Matches won; 7) Goal difference; 8) Goals scored; 9) 2021–22 position (not applicable to final standings); 10) Play-off.
(C) Champions

==== Results summary ====
| Overall | | | | | | | | Home | | | | | | Away | | | | | |
| Pld | W | D | L | GF | GA | GD | Pts | W | D | L | GF | GA | GD | W | D | L | GF | GA | GD |
|---|---|---|---|---|---|---|---|---|---|---|---|---|---|---|---|---|---|---|---|
| 0 | 0 | 0 | 0 | 0 | 0 | 0 | 0 | 0 | 0 | 0 | 0 | 0 | 0 | 0 | 0 | 0 | 0 | 0 | 0 |

Last updated: 3 June 2023.

==== Results by round ====
| Round | 1 |
|---|---|
| Ground | |
| Result | |
| Position | |

Updated to match(es) played on 3 June 2023. Source: See Results
A = Away; H = Home; W = Win; D = Draw; L = Loss

==== Matches ====
| 16 July 2022 1 | Akhmat Grozny | 1–1 | Spartak Moscow | Grozny |
| 20:00 MSK (UTC+3) | Todorović (yellow card) 41'; Konaté (yellow card) 44'; Timofeyev 45+'; Shvets (yellow card) 72'; Folmer (yellow card) 79'; Sheliya (yellow card) 89' | Report | Rybus (yellow card) 41' (yellow-red card) 41'; Zinkovsky (yellow card) 59'; Promes (yellow card) 72'; Moses 84' | Stadium: Akhmat-Arena; Attendance: 8,051; Referee: Vladislav Bezborodov |

| 23 July 2022 2 | Krasnodar | 1–4 | Spartak Moscow | Krasnodar |
| 20:00 MSK (UTC+3) | Borodin (yellow card) 24'; Chernikov (red card) 37'; Spertsyan 60' (pen.) | Report | Sobolev (yellow card) 20'; Martins (yellow card) 26'; Zobnin 35', 53'; Promes 46'; Litvinov (yellow card) 49'; Moses 83'; Selikhov (yellow card) 87' | Stadium: Krasnodar Stadium; Attendance: 28,738; Referee: Kirill Levnikov |

| 31 July 2022 3 | Spartak Moscow | 3–0 | Orenburg | Moscow |
| 17:30 MSK (UTC+3) | Martins 2'; Sobolev 12'; Promes 38', 90+' (penalty missed) 90+'; Khlusevich (yellow card) 80' | Report | Sivakow (yellow card) 21'; Bašić 55'; Oganesyan (yellow card) 61'; Ektov (yellow card) 87'; Khotulyov (yellow card) 90+' | Stadium: Lukoil Arena; Attendance: 11,303; Referee: Artem Chistyakov |

| 6 August 2022 4 | Ural Yekaterinburg | 0–2 | Spartak Moscow | Yekaterinburg |
| 15:00 MSK (UTC+3) | Gadzhimuradov (yellow card) 75' | Report | Promes 27' (yellow card) 28'; Ignatov 44'; Khlusevich (yellow card) 51' | Stadium: Central Stadium; Attendance: 8,931; Referee: Pavel Kukuyan |

| 14 August 2022 5 | Spartak Moscow | 3–0 | Sochi | Moscow |
| 20:00 MSK (UTC+3) | Promes 57', 84'; Sobolev (yellow card) 59'; Zinkovsky 71' | Report | Kravtsov (yellow card) 88' | Stadium: Lukoil Arena; Attendance: 11,559; Referee: Vitali Meshkov |

| 4 September 2022 8 | Spartak Moscow | 1-2 | Zenit St.Petersburg | Moscow |
| 20:00 MSK (UTC+3) | Sobolev 21'; Promes (yellow card) 42'; Rybus (yellow card) 89'; Dzhikiya (yellow card) FT | Report | Wendel (yellow card) 42'; Lovren 48'; Mostovoy 60'; Rodrigão (yellow card) 62' | Stadium: Otkritie Arena; Attendance: 14,950; Referee: Pavel Kukuyan |

| 11 September 2022 9 | Rostov | 4–2 | Spartak Moscow | Rostov-on-Don |
| 19:45 MSK (UTC+3) | Poloz 28', 71' (pen.); Utkin 34' (yellow card) 90+'; Komlichenko 53' | Report | Promes 24'; Rybus (yellow card) 69'; Sobolev 76' (yellow card) 90+'; Maslov (yellow card) 88' | Stadium: Rostov Arena; Attendance: 10,797; Referee: Sergei Karasev |

| 16 October 2022 13 | CSKA Moscow | 2–2 | Spartak Moscow | Moscow |
| 20:00 MSK (UTC+3) | Moisés (yellow card) 14'; Chalov 17', 70' (yellow card) 76'; Willyan (yellow card) 41'; Yermakov (yellow card) 82' | Report | Promes (yellow card) 8'; Sobolev (yellow card) 14' (goal) 58'; Khlusevich (yellow card) 18'; Litvinov (yellow card) 41'; Zinkovsky 53' | Stadium: VEB Arena; Attendance: 17,102; Referee: Sergei Karasev |

| 5 November 2022 16 | Sochi | 1–1 | Spartak Moscow | Sochi |
| 14:00 MSK (UTC+3) | Zaika 44' | Report | Promes 7'; Sobolev (yellow card) 10'; Khlusevich (yellow card) 37' | Stadium: Fisht Olympic Stadium; Attendance: 6,172; Referee: Artyom Chistyakov |

| 4 March 2023 18 | Spartak Moscow | 2–2 | Ural Yekaterinburg | Moscow |
| 14:00 MSK (UTC+3) | Duarte (yellow card) 29'; Litvinov 45+', 75'; Maslov (yellow card) 57'; Baldé (yellow card) 76'; Prutsev (yellow card) 90+' | Report | Vloet 19' (pen.) (yellow card) 19'; Bicfalvi 64'; Goglichidze (yellow card) 68' | Stadium: Lukoil Arena; Attendance: 4,281; Referee: Vitali Meshkov |

| 18 March 2023 20 | Orenburg | 2–0 | Spartak Moscow | Orenburg |
| 12:00 MSK (UTC+3) | Vorobyov (yellow card) 4' (goal) 23'; Kavalyow 17'; Sivakow (yellow card) 39'; Sysuyev (yellow card) 90+' | Report | Zinkovsky (yellow card) 37'; Sobolev (yellow card) 45+'; Litvinov (yellow card) 55' | Stadium: Gazovik Stadium; Attendance: 4,744; Referee: Pavel Kukuyan |

| 1 April 2023 21 | Spartak Moscow | 0–0 | Akhmat Grozny | Moscow |
| 16:30 MSK (UTC+3) | Nicholson (yellow card) 25'; Baldé (yellow card) 55'; Khlusevich (yellow card) 76' | Report | Ilyin (yellow card) 44'; Sheliya (yellow card) 90+' | Stadium: Otkritie Arena; Attendance: 5,849; Referee: Alexey Sukhoi |

| 24 April 2023 24 | Spartak Moscow | 4–3 | Krasnodar | Moscow |
| 19:00 MSK (UTC+3) | Dzhikiya (yellow card) 31'; Sobolev 63' (pen.), 68'; Zinkovsky 81'; Promes 85'; Selikhov (yellow card) 88' | Report | Córdoba 11'; Pina (yellow card) 43'; Litvinov (yellow card) 45+'; Batxi (yellow card) 54' (goal) 58'; Ramírez (yellow card) 63'; Spertsyan 72' | Stadium: Lukoil Arena; Attendance: 6,083; Referee: Vladislav Bezborodov |

| 29 April 2023 25 | Spartak Moscow | 1–1 | Rostov | Moscow |
| 19:30 MSK (UTC+3) | Litvinov (yellow card) 27'; Sobolev (yellow card) 33' (goal) 90+' | Report | Langovich (yellow card) 45+'; Melyokhin (yellow card) 77'; Selyava 80'; Glebov (yellow card) 89'; Pesyakov (yellow card) 90+'; Mironov (yellow card) 90+' | Stadium: Lukoil Arena; Attendance: 10,568; Referee: Kirill Levnikov |

| 6 May 2023 26 | Zenit St.Petersburg | 3–2 | Spartak Moscow | Saint Petersburg |
| 18:00 MSK (UTC+3) | Claudinho 13'; Mostovoy 40'; Wendel (yellow card) 74'; Chistyakov (yellow card) 84'; Sergeyev 90+'; Kerzhakov (yellow card) 90+' | Report | Baldé 33'; Zinkovsky (yellow card) 35'; Chernov (yellow card) 50'; Duarte (red card) 75'; Promes 85' (pen.) | Stadium: Krestovsky Stadium; Attendance: 44,704; Referee: Pavel Kukuyan |

| 21 May 2023 28 | Spartak Moscow | 2–1 | CSKA Moscow | Moscow |
| 16:30 MSK (UTC+3) | Promes 44', 90' (penalty missed) 90'; Ignatov (yellow card) 58'; Sobolev (red card) 66'; Chernov (yellow card) 77' | Report | Medina 28'; Willyan (red card) 66'; Medina (yellow card) 72' | Stadium: Lukoil Arena; Attendance: 24,679; Referee: Sergei Karasev |

=== Russian Cup ===
==== Group stage ====
| Pos | Team | Pld | W | PW | PL | L | GF | GA | GD | Pts | Qualification |
|---|---|---|---|---|---|---|---|---|---|---|---|
| 1 | Spartak Moscow | 6 | 4 | 0 | 1 | 1 | 10 | 3 | +7 | 13 | Qualification to the Knockout phase (RPL path) |
| 2 | Krylya Sovetov Samara | 6 | 4 | 0 | 0 | 2 | 7 | 4 | +3 | 12 | Qualification to the Knockout phase (RPL path) |
| 3 | Zenit Saint Petersburg | 6 | 3 | 1 | 0 | 2 | 6 | 6 | 0 | 11 | Qualification to the Knockout phase (regions path) |
| 4 | Fakel Voronezh | 6 | 0 | 0 | 0 | 6 | 1 | 11 | −10 | 0 | |

Source: Russian Football Union (in Russian), Soccerway
Rules for classification: 1) Points; 2) Head-to-head points; 3) Head-to-head matches won; 4) Head-to-head goal difference; 5) Head-to-head goals scored; 6) Matches won; 7) Goal difference; 8) Goals scored; 9) Penalty shoot-out goal difference; 10) Draw.

| 30 August 2022 1 | Spartak Moscow | 1–0 | Krylya Sovetov | Moscow |
| 19:00 MSK (UTC+3) | Rybus (yellow card) 41'; Melyoshin 46'; Khlusevich (yellow card) 62'; Prutsev (yellow card) 90+2' | Report | Zotov (yellow card) 33' | Stadium: Otkritie Arena; Attendance: 7,573; Referee: Sergey Ivanov |

| 15 September 2022 2 | Spartak Moscow | 3–0 | Fakel Voronezh | Moscow |
| 17:30 MSK (UTC+3) | Melyoshin 4'; Dzhikiya (yellow card) 30'; Promes 34'; Umyarov (yellow card) 65'; Sobolev 76'; Prutsev (yellow card) 81' | Report | Maksimov (yellow card) 36' | Stadium: Otkritie Arena; Attendance: 4,936; Referee: Evgeny Turbin |

| 29 September 2022 3 | Spartak Moscow | 3–0 | Zenit St.Petersburg | Moscow |
| 20:30 MSK (UTC+3) | Sobolev (yellow card) 22'; Promes (yellow card) 45' (goal) 79', 90+5'; Sobolev 86' | Report | Lovren (yellow card) 31'; Wendel (yellow card) 31'; Malcom (yellow card) 45+1'; Alip (yellow card) 84' | Stadium: Otkritie Arena; Attendance: 7,360; Referee: Vitali Meshkov |

| 19 October 2022 4 | Fakel Voronezh | 1–2 | Spartak Moscow | Voronezh |
| 18:00 MSK (UTC+3) | Maksimov 77' (pen.); Dmitriyev (yellow card) 90+1'; Bozhin (yellow card) 90+3'; Mendel (yellow card) 90+3' | Report | Nicholson (yellow card) 43'; Rasskazov 45+3'; Nicholson 51'; Mevlja (yellow card) 76'; Khlusevich (yellow card) 90+3' | Stadium: Tsentralnyi Profsoyuz Stadion; Attendance: 13,854; Referee: Aleksey Sukhoy |

| 23 November 2022 5 | Krylya Sovetov | 2–1 | Spartak Moscow | Samara |
| 18:00 MSK (UTC+3) | Kovalenko 73'; Pinyayev 74'; Pinyayev (yellow card) 82'; Bijl (yellow card) 84'; Fernando (yellow card) 90' | Report | Chernov 56' | Stadium: Solidarnost Samara Arena; Attendance: 6,412; Referee: Pavel Kukuyan |

| 27 November 2022 6 | Zenit St.Petersburg | 0–0 (4–2 p) | Spartak Moscow | Saint Petersburg |
| 16:00 MSK (UTC+3) | Rodrigão (yellow card) 74' (red card) 90+5'; Kuzyayev (yellow card) 74'; Yerokhin (yellow card) 88'; Barrios (yellow card) 90+4' (red card) 90+5'; Malcom (red card) 90+5' | Report | Dzhikiya (yellow card) 60'; Prutsev (yellow card) 63'; Klassen (yellow card) 65'; Nicholson (yellow card) 74' (red card) 90+5'; Zobnin (yellow card) 74'; Rybus (yellow card) 87'; Sobolev (red card) 90+5'; Selikhov (red card) 90+5' | Stadium: Krestovsky Stadium; Attendance: 51,813; Referee: Vladimir Moskalyov |
| | Penalties |
| | Kuzyayev (penalty scored); Mantuan (penalty scored); Mostovoy (penalty scored); Santos (penalty missed); Bakayev (penalty scored) | | (penalty scored) Khlusevich; (penalty missed) Zinkovsky; (penalty scored) Litvinov; (penalty missed) Denisov |

==== Knockout phase ====
| 22 February 2023 RPL path Quarterfinals 1st leg | Lokomotiv Moscow | 0–1 | Spartak Moscow | Moscow |
| 20:00 MSK (UTC+3) | Magkeyev (yellow card) 71'; Barinov (yellow card) 89' | Report | Purtsev 16'; Litvinov (yellow card) 42' | Stadium: RZD Arena; Attendance: 11,060; Referee: Vladislav Bezborodov |

| 27 February 2023 RPL path Quarterfinals 2nd leg | Spartak Moscow | 4–2 (5–2 agg.) | Lokomotiv Moscow | Moscow |
| 20:00 MSK (UTC+3) | Ignatov 15' (yellow card) 70'; Khlusevich (yellow card) 41'; Zinkovsky (yellow card) 44'; Zobnin 56'; Martins 81'; Promes (penalty missed) 90+4' 90+9' (pen.) | Report | Miranchuk 17', 83'; Glushenkov (yellow card) 18'; Barinov (yellow card) 62'; Tiknizyan (yellow card) 75' | Stadium: Otkritie Arena; Attendance: 10,185; Referee: Sergey Ivanov |

| 14 March 2023 RPL path Semi-finals 1st leg | Spartak Moscow | 1–1 | Ural Yekaterinburg | Moscow |
| 20:00 MSK (UTC+3) | Promes 21' | Report | Yegorychev (yellow card) 51'; Zheleznov 67'; Pomazun (yellow card) 83' | Stadium: Otkritie Arena; Attendance: 9,595; Referee: Sergei Karasev |

| 4 April 2023 RPL path Semi-finals 2nd leg | Ural Yekaterinburg | 2–1 | Spartak Moscow | Yekaterinburg |
| 17:00 MSK (UTC+3) | Begić (yellow card) 17'; Cissé 32'; Filipenko (yellow card) 40'; Kashtanov (yellow card) 52'; Sungatulin 72'; Goglichidze (yellow card) 90'; Kulakov (yellow card) 90+3' | Report | Khlusevich (yellow card) 44'; Baldé 49' (yellow card) 56'; Litvinov (yellow card) 50'; Zobnin (yellow card) 84' | Stadium: Yekaterinburg Arena; Attendance: 24,778; Referee: Kirill Levnikov |

| 19 April 2023 Regions path Semi-finals Stage 2 | Akron Tolyatti | 2–1 | Spartak Moscow | Zhigulyovsk |
| 16:30 MSK (UTC+3) | Ponce 41'; Saltykov 45+1'; Savichev (yellow card) 52' | Report | Duarte (yellow card) 61'; Tavres 78' | Stadium: Kristall Stadium; Attendance: 3,000; Referee: Aleksey Amelin |

== Squad statistics ==
As of match played 25 May 2023

=== Appearances and goals ===
| No. | Pos | Nat | Player | Total | | Premier League | | Russian Cup | |
| No. | Pos | Nat | Player | Apps | Goals | Apps | Goals | Apps | Goals |
|---|---|---|---|---|---|---|---|---|---|
| 4 | DF | (Paraguay) PAR | Alexis Duarte | 8 | 0 | 5+2 | 0 | 1 | 0 |
| 5 | DF | (Russia) RUS | Leon Klassen | 18 | 0 | 2+9 | 0 | 4+3 | 0 |
| 7 | FW | (Russia) RUS | Aleksandr Sobolev | 31 | 11 | 23+3 | 9 | 3+2 | 2 |
| 8 | MF | (Nigeria) NGR | Victor Moses | 11 | 2 | 3+7 | 2 | 0+1 | 0 |
| 9 | FW | (Senegal) SEN | Keita Baldé | 16 | 3 | 6+6 | 2 | 2+2 | 1 |
| 10 | MF | (Netherlands) NED | Quincy Promes | 36 | 25 | 25+2 | 20 | 7+2 | 5 |
| 11 | FW | (Jamaica) JAM | Shamar Nicholson | 26 | 3 | 10+12 | 2 | 2+2 | 1 |
| 13 | DF | (Poland) POL | Maciej Rybus | 11 | 1 | 3+5 | 1 | 3 | 0 |
| 14 | DF | (Russia) RUS | Georgi Dzhikiya | 29 | 0 | 21+1 | 0 | 6+1 | 0 |
| 17 | MF | (Russia) RUS | Anton Zinkovsky | 36 | 3 | 11+17 | 3 | 5+3 | 0 |
| 18 | MF | (Russia) RUS | Nail Umyarov | 15 | 0 | 10+2 | 0 | 2+1 | 0 |
| 20 | DF | (Portugal) POR | Tomás Tavares | 18 | 1 | 10+3 | 0 | 3+2 | 1 |
| 22 | MF | (Russia) RUS | Mikhail Ignatov | 30 | 3 | 18+3 | 2 | 8+1 | 1 |
| 23 | DF | (Russia) RUS | Nikita Chernov | 32 | 1 | 17+7 | 0 | 7+1 | 1 |
| 25 | MF | (Russia) RUS | Danil Prutsev | 37 | 2 | 17+10 | 1 | 10 | 1 |
| 35 | MF | (Luxembourg) LUX | Christopher Martins | 23 | 3 | 13+5 | 2 | 3+2 | 1 |
| 39 | DF | (Russia) RUS | Pavel Maslov | 27 | 1 | 6+13 | 1 | 6+2 | 0 |
| 47 | MF | (Russia) RUS | Roman Zobnin | 40 | 4 | 28+1 | 3 | 8+3 | 1 |
| 57 | GK | (Russia) RUS | Aleksandr Selikhov | 27 | 0 | 27 | 0 | 0 | 0 |
| 68 | MF | (Russia) RUS | Ruslan Litvinov | 33 | 3 | 22+3 | 3 | 6+2 | 0 |
| 70 | FW | (Russia) RUS | Pavel Melyoshin | 17 | 3 | 0+8 | 1 | 4+5 | 2 |
| 82 | DF | (Russia) RUS | Daniil Khlusevich | 34 | 0 | 22+4 | 0 | 7+1 | 0 |
| 87 | MF | (Russia) RUS | Daniil Zorin | 6 | 0 | 0+2 | 0 | 1+3 | 0 |
| 97 | DF | (Russia) RUS | Daniil Denisov | 40 | 1 | 26+3 | 1 | 7+4 | 0 |
| 98 | GK | (Russia) RUS | Aleksandr Maksimenko | 14 | 0 | 3 | 0 | 11 | 0 |
Players away from the club on loan:
| 3 | DF | (Belgium) BEL | Maximiliano Caufriez | 1 | 0 | 0+1 | 0 | 0 | 0 |
| 76 | MF | (Russia) RUS | Vitali Shitov | 2 | 0 | 0+1 | 0 | 0+1 | 0 |
Players who appeared for Spartak Moscow but left during the season:
| 32 | DF | (Slovenia) SLO | Miha Mevlja | 7 | 0 | 2+2 | 0 | 1+2 | 0 |
| 92 | DF | (Russia) RUS | Nikolai Rasskazov | 10 | 1 | 0+4 | 0 | 4+2 | 1 |

=== Goal scorers ===
| Place | Position | Nation | Number | Name | Premier League | Russian Cup | Total |
|---|---|---|---|---|---|---|---|
| 1 | FW | (Netherlands) | 10 | Quincy Promes | 20 | 5 | 25 |
| 2 | FW | (Russia) | 7 | Aleksandr Sobolev | 13 | 2 | 15 |
| 3 | MF | (Russia) | 47 | Roman Zobnin | 3 | 1 | 4 |
| 3 | FW | (Senegal) | 9 | Keita Baldé | 3 | 1 | 4 |
| 3 | FW | (Jamaica) | 11 | Shamar Nicholson | 3 | 1 | 4 |
| 6 | MF | (Russia) | 17 | Anton Zinkovsky | 3 | 0 | 3 |
| 6 | DF | (Russia) | 68 | Ruslan Litvinov | 3 | 0 | 3 |
| 6 | MF | (Russia) | 22 | Mikhail Ignatov | 2 | 1 | 3 |
| 6 | MF | (Luxembourg) | 35 | Christopher Martins | 2 | 1 | 3 |
| 6 | FW | (Russia) | 70 | Pavel Melyoshin | 1 | 2 | 3 |
| 11 | MF | (Nigeria) | 8 | Victor Moses | 2 | 0 | 2 |
| 11 | MF | (Russia) | 25 | Danil Prutsev | 1 | 1 | 2 |
| 13 | DF | (Poland) | 13 | Maciej Rybus | 1 | 0 | 1 |
| 13 | DF | (Russia) | 39 | Pavel Maslov | 1 | 0 | 1 |
| 13 | DF | (Russia) | 97 | Daniil Denisov | 1 | 0 | 1 |
| 13 | DF | (Portugal) | 20 | Tomás Tavares | 0 | 1 | 1 |
| 13 | DF | (Russia) | 23 | Nikita Chernov | 0 | 1 | 1 |
| 13 | DF | (Russia) | 92 | Nikolai Rasskazov | 0 | 1 | 1 |
| 13 | | | | Own goal | 1 | 0 | 1 |
| Total | | | | | 60 | 19 | 79 |

=== Clean sheets ===
| Place | Position | Nation | Number | Name | Premier League | Russian Cup | Total |
|---|---|---|---|---|---|---|---|
| 1 | GK | (Russia) | 57 | Aleksandr Selikhov | 7 | 0 | 7 |
| 2 | GK | (Russia) | 98 | Aleksandr Maksimenko | 0 | 5 | 5 |
| Total | | | | | 7 | 5 | 12 |

=== Disciplinary record ===
| Number | Nation | Position | Name | Premier League | | Russian Cup | | Total | |
| Number | Nation | Position | Name | Yellow card | Red card | Yellow card | Red card | Yellow card | Red card |
|---|---|---|---|---|---|---|---|---|---|
| 4 | (Paraguay) | DF | Alexis Duarte | 1 | 1 | 1 | 0 | 2 | 1 |
| 5 | (Russia) | DF | Leon Klassen | 0 | 0 | 1 | 0 | 1 | 0 |
| 7 | (Russia) | FW | Aleksandr Sobolev | 9 | 1 | 1 | 1 | 10 | 2 |
| 8 | (Nigeria) | MF | Victor Moses | 1 | 0 | 0 | 0 | 1 | 0 |
| 9 | (Senegal) | FW | Keita Baldé | 2 | 0 | 1 | 0 | 3 | 0 |
| 10 | (Netherlands) | FW | Quincy Promes | 6 | 0 | 1 | 0 | 7 | 0 |
| 11 | (Jamaica) | FW | Shamar Nicholson | 2 | 0 | 2 | 1 | 4 | 1 |
| 13 | (Poland) | DF | Maciej Rybus | 4 | 1 | 2 | 0 | 6 | 1 |
| 14 | (Russia) | DF | Georgi Dzhikiya | 6 | 1 | 2 | 0 | 8 | 1 |
| 17 | (Russia) | MF | Anton Zinkovsky | 3 | 0 | 1 | 0 | 4 | 0 |
| 18 | (Russia) | MF | Nail Umyarov | 0 | 0 | 1 | 0 | 1 | 0 |
| 22 | (Russia) | MF | Mikhail Ignatov | 2 | 0 | 1 | 0 | 3 | 0 |
| 23 | (Russia) | DF | Nikita Chernov | 4 | 0 | 0 | 0 | 4 | 0 |
| 25 | (Russia) | MF | Danil Prutsev | 4 | 0 | 3 | 0 | 7 | 0 |
| 35 | (Luxembourg) | MF | Christopher Martins | 3 | 1 | 0 | 0 | 3 | 1 |
| 39 | (Russia) | DF | Pavel Maslov | 2 | 0 | 0 | 0 | 2 | 0 |
| 47 | (Russia) | MF | Roman Zobnin | 3 | 0 | 2 | 0 | 5 | 0 |
| 57 | (Russia) | GK | Aleksandr Selikhov | 3 | 0 | 0 | 1 | 3 | 1 |
| 68 | (Russia) | DF | Ruslan Litvinov | 7 | 1 | 2 | 0 | 9 | 1 |
| 70 | (Russia) | FW | Pavel Melyoshin | 1 | 0 | 0 | 0 | 1 | 0 |
| 82 | (Russia) | MF | Daniil Khlusevich | 7 | 0 | 4 | 0 | 11 | 0 |
| 97 | (Russia) | DF | Daniil Denisov | 6 | 1 | 0 | 0 | 6 | 1 |
| 98 | (Russia) | GK | Aleksandr Maksimenko | 1 | 0 | 0 | 0 | 1 | 0 |
Players away on loan:
Players who left Spartak Moscow during the season:
| 32 | (Slovenia) | DF | Miha Mevlja | 0 | 0 | 1 | 0 | 1 | 0 |
| Total | | | | 77 | 7 | 25 | 3 | 102 | 10 |
