= 2024–25 FC Spartak Moscow season =

FC Spartak Moscow
2024–25 season
- Manager: Dejan Stanković
- Stadium: Lukoil Arena
- Premier League: 4th
- Russian Cup: Regions path Final
- Top goalscorer: League: Manfred Ugalde (17); All: Manfred Ugalde (18)
- Highest home attendance: 40,109 vs Zenit St.Petersburg (16 March 2025)
- Lowest home attendance: 9,393 vs Rostov (5 November 2024)
- Average home league attendance: 19,979 (24 May 2025)
- Biggest win: Spartak Moscow 4–0 Akron Tolyatti (10 November 2024)
- Biggest defeat: Spartak Moscow 0–3 Krasnodar (19 October 2024)
| Home colours | Away colours | Third colours |

The 2024–25 season was the 103rd season in the history of FC Spartak Moscow, and the club's 33rd consecutive season in the Russian top division. In addition to the domestic league, the team participated in the Russian Cup.

== Season events ==
On 16 May 2024, Spartak announced the end of Vladimir Slišković's role as caretaker head coach, with Dejan Stanković being appointed as their new head coach on a two-year contract.

On 1 July, Spartak announced the signing of Willian José to a two-year contract, from Real Betis.

On 25 July, Spartak announced the signing of Esequiel Barco to a three-year contract, from River Plate.

On 26 July, Spartak announced the signing of Aleksandr Dovbnya to a one-year contract, from Shinnik Yaroslavl.

On 3 August, Spartak announced the signing of Marquinhos to a three-year contract, from Ferencváros.

On 16 August, Spartak announced the signing of Myenty Abena to a two-year contract, from Ferencváros.

On 10 September, Spartak announced the signing of Ricardo Mangas to a two-year contract, from Vitória de Guimarães.

On 2 February, Spartak announced the signing of Ilya Pomazun to a two-and-a-half year contract, from CSKA Moscow.

On 7 February, Spartak announced the signing of Levi García to a three-and-a-half year contract, from AEK Athens.

On 11 February, Spartak announced the signing of Pablo Solari to a four-and-a-half year contract, from River Plate.

== Squad ==
As of match played 24 May 2025

| No. | Name | Nationality | Position | Date of birth (age) | Signed from | Signed in | Contract ends | Apps. | Goals |
|---|---|---|---|---|---|---|---|---|---|
| 1 | Ilya Pomazun | (Russia) | GK | 16 August 1996 (aged 28) | CSKA Moscow | 2025 | 2027 | 3 | 0 |
| 16 | Aleksandr Dovbnya | (Russia) | GK | 14 April 1987 (aged 38) | Shinnik Yaroslavl | 2024 | 2025 | 1 | 0 |
| 98 | Aleksandr Maksimenko | (Russia) | GK | 23 February 1998 (aged 27) | Academy | 2014 | | 198 | 0 |
Defenders
| 2 | Oleg Reabciuk | (Moldova) | DF | 16 January 1998 (aged 27) | Olympiacos | 2023 | 2026 | 54 | 0 |
| 4 | Alexis Duarte | (Paraguay) | DF | 12 March 2000 (aged 25) | Cerro Porteño | 2023 | 2027 | 60 | 0 |
| 6 | Srđan Babić | (Serbia) | DF | 22 April 1996 (aged 29) | Almería | 2023 | 2026 | 55 | 5 |
| 14 | Myenty Abena | (Suriname) | DF | 12 December 1994 (aged 30) | Ferencváros | 2024 | 2026 | 12 | 0 |
| 23 | Nikita Chernov | (Russia) | DF | 14 January 1996 (aged 29) | Krylia Sovetov | 2022 | 2026 | 79 | 1 |
| 29 | Ricardo Mangas | (Portugal) | DF | 19 March 1998 (aged 27) | Vitória de Guimarães | 2024 | 2026 | 17 | 3 |
| 68 | Ruslan Litvinov | (Russia) | DF | 18 August 2001 (aged 23) | Academy | 2018 | | 129 | 5 |
| 74 | Yegor Guziyev | (Russia) | DF | 14 May 2005 (aged 20) | Academy | 2024 | | 2 | 0 |
| 97 | Daniil Denisov | (Russia) | DF | 21 October 2002 (aged 22) | Academy | 2020 | | 113 | 1 |
Midfielders
| 5 | Esequiel Barco | (Argentina) | MF | 29 March 1999 (aged 26) | River Plate | 2024 | 2027 | 36 | 14 |
| 8 | Marquinhos | (Brazil) | MF | 23 October 1999 (aged 25) | Ferencváros | 2024 | 2027 | 36 | 2 |
| 18 | Nail Umyarov | (Russia) | MF | 27 June 2000 (aged 24) | Chertanovo Moscow | 2019 | | 164 | 5 |
| 19 | Jesús Medina | (Paraguay) | MF | 30 April 1997 (aged 28) | CSKA Moscow | 2023 | 2026 | 58 | 8 |
| 22 | Mikhail Ignatov | (Russia) | MF | 4 May 2000 (aged 25) | Academy | 2016 | | 131 | 9 |
| 25 | Danil Prutsev | (Russia) | MF | 25 March 2000 (aged 25) | Krylia Sovetov | 2022 | 2026 | 110 | 5 |
| 35 | Christopher Martins | (Luxembourg) | MF | 19 February 1997 (aged 28) | Young Boys | 2022 | 2026 | 106 | 18 |
| 47 | Roman Zobnin | (Russia) | MF | 11 February 1994 (aged 31) | Dynamo Moscow | 2016 | | 270 | 19 |
| 56 | Nikita Massalyga | (Russia) | MF | 9 October 2007 (aged 17) | Yenisey Krasnoyarsk | 2023 | | 3 | 0 |
| 77 | Théo Bongonda | (Democratic Republic of the Congo) | MF | 20 November 1995 (aged 29) | Cádiz | 2023 | 2026 | 69 | 16 |
| 82 | Daniil Khlusevich | (Russia) | MF | 26 February 2001 (aged 24) | Arsenal Tula | 2021 | 2026 | 98 | 5 |
Forwards
| 7 | Pablo Solari | (Argentina) | FW | 22 March 2001 (aged 24) | River Plate | 2025 | 2029 | 15 | 2 |
| 9 | Manfred Ugalde | (Costa Rica) | FW | 25 May 2002 (aged 22) | Twente | 2024 | 2028 | 51 | 19 |
| 11 | Levi García | (Trinidad and Tobago) | FW | 20 November 1997 (aged 27) | AEK Athens | 2025 | 2028 | 15 | 3 |
Away on loan
| 17 | Anton Zinkovsky | (Russia) | MF | 14 April 1996 (aged 29) | Krylia Sovetov | 2022. | 2027 | 86 | 7 |
| 28 | Daniil Zorin | (Russia) | MF | 22 February 2004 (aged 21) | Academy | 2022 | | 16 | 2 |
| 39 | Pavel Maslov | (Russia) | DF | 14 April 2000 (aged 25) | Tyumen | 2018 | 2024 | 78 | 2 |
| | Igor Dmitriyev | (Russia) | MF | 24 July 2004 (aged 20) | Ural Yekaterinburg | 2024 | | 0 | 0 |
| | Maksim Laykin | (Russia) | MF | 31 May 2003 (aged 21) | Academy | 2020 | | 3 | 0 |
| | Anton Roshchin | (Russia) | MF | 24 March 2005 (aged 20) | Academy | 2023 | | 1 | 0 |
| | Vitali Shitov | (Russia) | MF | 7 May 2003 (aged 22) | Academy | 2020 | | 2 | 0 |
Players that left Spartak Moscow during the season
| 7 | Aleksandr Sobolev | (Russia) | FW | 7 March 1997 (aged 28) | Krylia Sovetov | 2020 | | 139 | 54 |
| 11 | Shamar Nicholson | (Jamaica) | FW | 16 March 1997 (aged 28) | Charleroi | 2022 | 2026 | 56 | 15 |
| 12 | Willian José | (Brazil) | FW | 23 November 1991 (aged 33) | Real Betis | 2024 | 2026 | 13 | 1 |
| 57 | Aleksandr Selikhov | (Russia) | GK | 7 April 1994 (aged 31) | Amkar Perm | 2016 | | 101 | 0 |
| 70 | Pavel Melyoshin | (Russia) | FW | 25 March 2004 (aged 21) | Academy | 2022 | | 30 | 4 |
| | Tomás Tavares | (Portugal) | DF | 7 March 2001 (aged 24) | Benfica | 2023 | 2026 | 22 | 1 |

== Transfers ==
=== In ===
| Date | Position | Nationality | Name | From | Fee | Ref. |
|---|---|---|---|---|---|---|
| 1 July 2024 | FW | (Brazil) | Willian José | Real Betis | Undisclosed | |
| 25 July 2024 | MF | (Argentina) | Esequiel Barco | River Plate | Undisclosed | |
| 26 July 2024 | GK | (Russia) | Aleksandr Dovbnya | Shinnik Yaroslavl | Undisclosed | |
| 3 August 2024 | MF | (Brazil) | Marquinhos | Ferencváros | Undisclosed | |
| 16 August 2024 | DF | (Suriname) | Myenty Abena | Ferencváros | Undisclosed | |
| 10 September 2024 | DF | (Portugal) | Ricardo Mangas | Vitória de Guimarães | Undisclosed | |
| 2 February 2025 | GK | (Russia) | Ilya Pomazun | CSKA Moscow | Undisclosed | |
| 7 February 2025 | FW | (Trinidad and Tobago) | Levi García | AEK Athens | Undisclosed | |
| 11 February 2025 | FW | (Argentina) | Pablo Solari | River Plate | Undisclosed | |

=== Out ===
| Date | Position | Nationality | Name | To | Fee | Ref. |
|---|---|---|---|---|---|---|
| 8 July 2024 | GK | (Russia) | Ilya Svinov | Baltika Kaliningrad | Undisclosed | |
| 20 July 2024 | DF | (Russia) | Nikita Bozov | Baltika Kaliningrad | Undisclosed | |
| 30 August 2024 | FW | (Russia) | Aleksandr Sobolev | Zenit St.Petersburg | Undisclosed | |
| 20 February 2025 | FW | (Russia) | Pavel Melyoshin | Sochi | Undisclosed | |

=== Loans out ===
| Date from | Position | Nationality | Name | To | Date to | Ref. |
|---|---|---|---|---|---|---|
| 1 July 2024 | DF | (Russia) | Nikolai Tolstopyatov | Neftekhimik Nizhnekamsk | End of season | |
| 1 July 2024 | MF | (Russia) | Konstantin Shiltsov | Neftekhimik Nizhnekamsk | End of season | |
| 1 July 2024 | FW | (Russia) | Vitali Shitov | Torpedo Moscow | End of season | |
| 10 July 2024 | MF | (Russia) | Maksim Laykin | Yenisey Krasnoyarsk | End of season | |
| 23 July 2024 | DF | (Portugal) | Tomás Tavares | LASK | 15 January 2025 | |
| 7 August 2024 | MF | (Russia) | Igor Dmitriyev | Krylia Sovetov | End of season | |
| 12 September 2024 | DF | (Russia) | Pavel Maslov | Sochi | End of season | |
| 12 September 2024 | FW | (Russia) | Pavel Melyoshin | Sochi | 20 February 2025 | |
| 16 January 2025 | MF | (Russia) | Maksim Laykin | Neftekhimik Nizhnekamsk | End of season | |
| 20 January 2025 | MF | (Russia) | Vitali Shitov | Tyumen | End of season | |
| 18 February 2025 | MF | (Russia) | Anton Zinkovsky | Krylia Sovetov | End of season | |
| 20 February 2025 | MF | (Russia) | Daniil Zorin | Akhmat Grozny | End of season | |

=== Released ===
| Date | Position | Nationality | Name | Joined | Date | Ref. |
|---|---|---|---|---|---|---|
| 6 July 2024 | FW | (Senegal) | Keita Baldé | Sivasspor | 13 August 2024 | |
| 14 January 2025 | FW | (Brazil) | Willian José | Bahia | 14 January 2025 | |
| 15 January 2025 | DF | (Portugal) | Tomás Tavares | AVS | 21 January 2025 | |
| 22 January 2025 | GK | (Russia) | Aleksandr Selikhov | Ural Yekaterinburg | 19 February 2025 | |
| 2 February 2025 | FW | (Jamaica) | Shamar Nicholson | Tijuana | 5 February 2025 | |

== Friendlies ==
| 27 June 2024 | Spartak Moscow | 3–1 | Torpedo Moscow |
| 11:30 MSK (UTC+3) | Zinkovsky 27'; Melyoshin 49'; Zorin 70' | Report | Ivankov 37' |

| 5 July 2024 | Aktobe | 1–1 | Spartak Moscow |
| 16:00 MSK (UTC+3) | Samorodov 13' | Report | Chernov 47' |

| 7 July 2024 | Spartak Moscow | 1–0 | Ufa |
| 16:30 MSK (UTC+3) | Melyoshin 15' | Report |

| 12 July 2024 | Dynamo Moscow | 1–1 (5–4 p) | Spartak Moscow |
| 15:30 MSK (UTC+3) | Majstorović (yellow card) 13'; Ngamaleu 24'; Zorin 70' | Report | Chernov (yellow card) 40' (goal) 74'; Khlusevich (yellow card) 45+2' |
| | Penalties |
| | Grulyov (penalty scored); Makarov (penalty scored); Okishor (penalty scored); Lepsky (penalty scored); Gagnidze (penalty scored) | | (penalty missed) Zinkovsky; (penalty scored) Umyarov; (penalty scored) Zorin; (penalty scored) Medina; (penalty scored) Melyoshin |

| 15 July 2024 | Spartak Moscow | 3–0 | Nasaf |
| 12:00 MSK (UTC+3) | Denisov 13'; Melyoshin 43'; Zorin 45' | Report |

== Competitions ==
=== Overall record ===
| Competition | First match | Last match | Starting round | Final position | Record | | | | | | | |
| Competition | First match | Last match | Starting round | Final position | Pld | W | D | L | GF | GA | GD | Win % |
|---|---|---|---|---|---|---|---|---|---|---|---|---|
| Premier League | 21 July 2024 | 24 May 2025 | Matchday 1 | 4th | 30 | 17 | 6 | 7 | 56 | 25 | +31 | 56.67 |
| Russian Cup | 31 July 2024 | 15 May 2025 | Group stage | Regions path Final | 12 | 8 | 0 | 4 | 24 | 12 | +12 | 66.67 |
| Total | | | | | 42 | 25 | 6 | 11 | 80 | 37 | +43 | 59.52 |

Last updated: 24 May 2025
Source: Soccerway

=== Russian Premier League ===
==== League table ====
| Pos | Team | Pld | W | D | L | GF | GA | GD | Pts |
|---|---|---|---|---|---|---|---|---|---|
| 2 | Zenit Saint Petersburg | 30 | 20 | 6 | 4 | 58 | 18 | +40 | 66 |
| 3 | CSKA Moscow | 30 | 17 | 8 | 5 | 47 | 21 | +26 | 59 |
| 4 | Spartak Moscow | 30 | 17 | 6 | 7 | 56 | 25 | +31 | 57 |
| 5 | Dynamo Moscow | 30 | 16 | 8 | 6 | 61 | 35 | +26 | 56 |
| 6 | Lokomotiv Moscow | 30 | 15 | 8 | 7 | 51 | 41 | +10 | 53 |

Source: Premier Liga
Rules for classification: 1) Points; 2) Head-to-head points; 3) Head-to-head matches won; 4) Head-to-head goal difference; 5) Head-to-head goals scored; 6) Matches won; 7) Goal difference; 8) Goals scored; 9) 2023–24 position (not applicable to final standings); 10) Play-off. Note: if teams tied on points did not play an equal number of head-to-head games, head-to-head results are not considered for the standings.

==== Results summary ====
| Overall | | | | | | | | Home | | | | | | Away | | | | | |
| Pld | W | D | L | GF | GA | GD | Pts | W | D | L | GF | GA | GD | W | D | L | GF | GA | GD |
|---|---|---|---|---|---|---|---|---|---|---|---|---|---|---|---|---|---|---|---|
| 30 | 17 | 6 | 7 | 56 | 25 | +31 | 57 | 10 | 2 | 3 | 35 | 12 | +23 | 7 | 4 | 4 | 21 | 13 | +8 |

Last updated: 24 May 2025.

==== Results by round ====
| Round | 1 | 2 | 3 | 4 | 5 | 6 | 7 | 8 | 9 | 10 | 11 | 12 | 13 | 14 | 15 | 16 | 17 | 18 | 19 | 20 | 21 | 22 | 23 | 24 | 25 | 26 | 27 | 28 | 29 | 30 |
|---|---|---|---|---|---|---|---|---|---|---|---|---|---|---|---|---|---|---|---|---|---|---|---|---|---|---|---|---|---|---|
| Ground | A | A | H | H | A | A | H | A | H | A | H | H | A | A | H | H | A | H | H | A | H | A | A | H | A | H | A | A | A | H |
| Result | L | W | W | D | W | D | W | D | D | L | W | L | W | W | W | W | W | W | W | L | W | D | W | L | W | L | D | L | W | W |
| Position | 15 | 7 | 5 | 5 | 4 | 5 | 4 | 5 | 5 | 6 | 6 | 6 | 6 | 5 | 5 | 4 | 3 | 3 | 2 | 3 | 2 | 3 | 2 | 3 | 3 | 4 | 4 | 5 | 5 | 4 |

Updated to match(es) played on 24 May 2025. Source:
A = Away; H = Home; W = Win; D = Draw; L = Loss

==== Matches ====
The match schedule was released on 20 June 2024.

| 21 July 2024 1 | Orenburg | 2–0 | Spartak Moscow | Orenburg |
| 17:30 MSK (UTC+3) | Pérez (yellow card) 43', (goal) 62'; Gürlük 67'; Muro (yellow card) 88' | Report | Umyarov (yellow card) 23'; Khlusevich (yellow card) 80' | Stadium: Gazovik Stadium; Attendance: 7,270; Referee: Aleksey Sukhoy |

| 28 July 2024 2 | Khimki | 1–3 | Spartak Moscow | Khimki |
| 15:00 MSK (UTC+3) | Anđelković (yellow card) 62'; Zabolotny (yellow card) 73'; Magomedov 90' | Report | Bongonda (penalty missed) 45+'; Barco 49'; Ugalde 55'; Babić 72'; Zobnin (yellow card) 90+' | Stadium: Arena Khimki; Attendance: 6,305; Referee: Vasily Kazartsev |

| 5 August 2024 3 | Spartak Moscow | 3–0 | Krylya Sovetov | Moscow |
| 20:00 MSK (UTC+3) | Ugalde 29', 56'; Prutsev 40'; Denisov (yellow card) 61' | Report | Babkin (yellow card) 23'; Vityugov (yellow card) 28'; Bijl (yellow card) 68'; Popov (yellow card) 86' | Stadium: Lukoil Arena; Attendance: 13,407; Referee: Kirill Levnikov |

| 11 August 2024 4 | Spartak Moscow | 0–0 | Akhmat Grozny | Moscow |
| 20:00 MSK (UTC+3) | Litvinov (yellow card) 45+'; Umyarov (yellow card) 54'; Denisov (yellow card) 59'; Babić (yellow card) 63' | Report | Sadulayev (yellow card) 47'; Shvets (yellow card) 63'; Agalarov (yellow card) 68'; Sheliya (yellow card) 90+' | Stadium: Lukoil Arena; Attendance: 14,257; Referee: Vladislav Bezborodov |

| 18 August 2024 5 | Spartak Moscow | 3–0 | Fakel Voronezh | Moscow |
| 17:30 MSK (UTC+3) | Ugalde 3'; Babić 9'; Barco 60' (pen.) | Report | Bozhin (yellow card) 11'; Bagamayev (yellow card) 88' | Stadium: Lukoil Arena; Attendance: 11,534; Referee: Sergey Ivanov |

| 24 August 2024 6 | Zenit St.Petersburg | 0–0 | Spartak Moscow | Saint Petersburg |
| 17:30 MSK (UTC+3) | Eraković (yellow card) 56' (yellow-red card); Santos (yellow card) 90+4' | Report | Martins (yellow card) 12'; Medina (yellow card) 34'; Umyarov (yellow card) 36'; Denisov (yellow card) 65' | Stadium: Krestovsky Stadium; Attendance: 48,534; Referee: Vitali Meshkov |

| 31 August 2024 7 | Spartak Moscow | 1–0 | Rubin Kazan | Moscow |
| 19:45 MSK (UTC+3) | Denisov (yellow card) 29'; Zobnin (yellow card) 45+' (yellow-red card) 62'; Barco 74' (pen.); Reabciuk (yellow card) 90+' | Report | Vujačić (yellow card) 26'; Rozhkov (yellow card) 39'; Daku (yellow card) 90+' | Stadium: Lukoil Arena; Attendance: 16,694; Referee: Sergei Karasev |

| 15 September 2024 8 | Dynamo Makhachkala | 1–1 | Spartak Moscow | Kaspiysk |
| 19:00 MSK (UTC+3) | Litvinov 36' (o.g.); Sundukov (yellow card) 50'; Mrezigue (red card) 90+'; Kagermazov (yellow card) 90+3' | Report | Ugalde 20'; Bongonda (yellow card) 69'; Babić (yellow card) 75' | Stadium: Anzhi Arena; Attendance: 11,839; Referee: Pavel Kukuyan |

| 22 September 2024 9 | Spartak Moscow | 2–2 | Dynamo Moscow | Moscow |
| 16:30 MSK (UTC+3) | Ugalde 7'; Barco 23' (pen.); Babić (yellow card) 52'; Medina (yellow card) 79' | Report | Tyukavin 3', 90+'; Bitello (yellow card) 56'; Maouhoub (yellow card) 72' (yellow-red card) 74'; Fernández (yellow card) 72' | Stadium: Lukoil Arena; Attendance: 26,297; Referee: Sergey Ivanov |

| 28 September 2024 10 | Lokomotiv Moscow | 3–1 | Spartak Moscow | Moscow |
| 16:30 MSK (UTC+3) | Samoshnikov 7', 36' (yellow card) 69'; Vorobyov 58' | Report | Barco 16' (pen.) (yellow card) 71'; Babić (yellow card) 45+'; Ugalde (yellow card) 47'; Reabciuk (yellow card) 61'; Martins (yellow card) 86'; Khlusevich (yellow card) 90+' | Stadium: RZD Arena; Attendance: 19,725; Referee: Vladislav Bezborodov |

| 5 October 2024 11 | Spartak Moscow | 3–0 | Rostov | Moscow |
| 19:00 MSK (UTC+3) | Denisov (yellow card) 11'; Umyarov 29'; Nicholson 34', 45+' (yellow card) 37'; Litvinov (yellow card) 74' | Report | Langovich (yellow card) 21' | Stadium: Lukoil Arena; Attendance: 14,695; Referee: Pavel Kukuyan |

| 19 October 2024 12 | Spartak Moscow | 0–3 | Krasnodar | Moscow |
| 16:30 MSK (UTC+3) | Umyarov (yellow card) 34'; Litvinov (yellow card) 68' | Report | Pina 8' (yellow card) 10'; Sá 45'; Medina 90+' (o.g.) | Stadium: Lukoil Arena; Attendance: 25,422; Referee: Kirill Levnikov |

| 27 October 2024 13 | Pari NN | 0–2 | Spartak Moscow | Nizhny Novgorod |
| 14:15 MSK (UTC+3) | Ožegović (yellow card) 84'; Karapuzov (red card) 90+' | Report | Martins (yellow card) 30'; Bongonda 68'; Nicholson 90+'; Duarte (yellow card) 90+' | Stadium: Nizhny Novgorod Stadium; Attendance: 15,374; Referee: Vladimir Moskalov |

| 2 November 2024 14 | CSKA Moscow | 0–2 | Spartak Moscow | Moscow |
| 20:45 MSK (UTC+3) | Willyan (red card) 57'; Oblyakov (yellow card) 69' (yellow-red card) 85'; Pjanić (yellow card) 83' | Report | Bongonda 45'; Babić (yellow card) 57'; Umyarov (yellow card) 57'; Litvinov (red card) 57'; Prutsev (yellow card) 83'; Denisov (yellow card) 90'; Medina 90+' | Stadium: VEB Arena; Attendance: 23,045; Referee: Aleksey Sukhoi |

| 10 November 2024 15 | Spartak Moscow | 4–0 | Akron Tolyatti | Moscow |
| 15:15 MSK (UTC+3) | Bongonda 28', 63'; Ugalde 58', 74' | Report | Bakayev (yellow card) 86' (yellow-red card) 86' | Stadium: Lukoil Arena; Attendance: 11,360; Referee: Sergey Ivanov |

| 23 November 2024 16 | Spartak Moscow | 5–2 | Lokomotiv Moscow | Moscow |
| 18:00 MSK (UTC+3) | Ugalde 10', 21', 34', 73'; Reabciuk (yellow card) 50'; Martins (yellow card) 62'; Barco 80' | Report | Nyamsi (yellow card) 41' (goal) 63'; Montes (yellow card) 42'; Pinyayev 55'; Suleymanov (yellow card) 67'; Batrakov (yellow card) 68'; Samoshnikov (yellow card) 85' | Stadium: Lukoil Arena; Attendance: 20,152; Referee: Kirill Levnikov |

| 1 December 2024 17 | Krasnodar | 0–3 | Spartak Moscow | Krasnodar |
| 19:30 MSK (UTC+3) | Chernikov (yellow card) 19'; Petrov (yellow card) 40'; Córdoba (yellow card) 68'; Tormena (yellow card) 71' | Report | Ugalde 17', 28' (yellow card) 62'; Marquinhos (yellow card) 26'; Babić (yellow card) 82'; Barco 90+' (yellow card) 90+' | Stadium: Krasnodar Stadium; Attendance: 33,146; Referee: Artem Chistyakov |

| 7 December 2024 18 | Spartak Moscow | 3–0 | Pari NN | Moscow |
| 14:00 MSK (UTC+3) | Bongonda 53'; Ugalde 62'; Barco 64' | Report | Karapuzov (yellow card) 33'; Vedernikov (yellow card) 90+' | Stadium: Lukoil Arena; Attendance: 14,315; Referee: Evgeniy Kukulyak |

| 2 March 2025 19 | Spartak Moscow | 2–0 | Orenburg | Moscow |
| 16:30 MSK (UTC+3) | Ugalde 51'; Solari 90+'; Denisov (yellow card) 90+' | Report | Sidorov (yellow card) 8' (yellow-red card) 58'; Marín (yellow card) 49' | Stadium: Lukoil Arena; Attendance: 16,995; Referee: Pavel Kukuyan |

| 9 March 2025 20 | Rubin Kazan | 2–1 | Spartak Moscow | Kazan |
| 19:30 MSK (UTC+3) | Kabutov (yellow card) 5'; Daku 8', 28' (yellow card) 28' (yellow-red card) 75'; Iwu (yellow card) 59' | Report | Barco 42' (pen.); Duarte (yellow card) 63' (yellow-red card) 75'; Marquinhos (yellow card) 68'; Solari (yellow card) 87' | Stadium: Ak Bars Arena; Attendance: 17,449; Referee: Kirill Levnikov |

| 16 March 2025 21 | Spartak Moscow | 2–1 | Zenit St.Petersburg | Moscow |
| 19:45 MSK (UTC+3) | Babić (yellow card) 27'; Umyarov (yellow card) 31'; Martins 45+', 90' (yellow card) 81'; Reabciuk (yellow card) 73' | Report | Henrique (yellow card) 53' (goal) 83'; Eraković (yellow card) 90+' | Stadium: Lukoil Arena; Attendance: 40,109; Referee: Sergey Ivanov |

| 30 March 2025 22 | Akhmat Grozny | 0–0 | Spartak Moscow | Grozny |
| 16:30 MSK (UTC+3) | Ghandri (yellow card) 15'; Ibishev (yellow card) 36' | Report | Babić (yellow card) 83' | Stadium: Akhmat-Arena; Attendance: 1,706; Referee: Vasily Kazartsev |

| 6 April 2025 23 | Rostov | 0–3 | Spartak Moscow | Rostov-on-Don |
| 16:30 MSK (UTC+3) | Sutormin (red card) 45+'; Komlichenko (yellow card) 45+'; Melyokhin (yellow card) 62' | Report | Solari (yellow card) 62'; Umyarov 65'; Martins 68'; Barco 88' | Stadium: Rostov Arena; Attendance: 29,122; Referee: Vladimir Moskalyov |

| 11 April 2025 24 | Spartak Moscow | 1–2 | Dynamo Makhachkala | Moscow |
| 19:30 MSK (UTC+3) | Denisov (yellow card) 45+'; Bongonda 68'; Solari (yellow card) 81'; Medina (penalty missed) 87' | Report | Glushkov (yellow card) 2'; Kagermazov (yellow card) 3'; Denisov 10' (o.g.); Mrezigue 16' | Stadium: Lukoil Arena; Attendance: 18,731; Referee: Vitali Meshkov |

| 19 April 2025 25 | Akron Tolyatti | 2–3 | Spartak Moscow | Samara |
| 14:30 MSK (UTC+3) | Dzyuba 23' (pen.) (yellow card) 79'; Pestryakov 29' (yellow card) 71'; Savichev (yellow card) 34'; Kuzmin (yellow card) 45+'; Đakovac (yellow card) 90+' | Report | Bongonda 39'; Barco (penalty missed) 45+' 90+' (pen.) (yellow card) 90+'; Đurasović 61' (o.g.); Solari (yellow card) 71' | Stadium: Solidarnost Samara Arena; Attendance: 8,728; Referee: Aleksey Sukhoi |

| 26 April 2025 26 | Spartak Moscow | 1–2 | CSKA Moscow | Moscow |
| 19:30 MSK (UTC+3) | Martins (yellow card) 4'; Babić (yellow card) 41' (yellow-red card) 90+'; Duarte (yellow card) 61'; Barco 87' (pen.) (yellow card) 88'; Maksimenko (yellow card) 89' | Report | Fayzullaev (yellow card) 16'; Guarirapa 44'; Pjanić (yellow card) 51'; Gajić (yellow card) 60'; Glebov (yellow card) 88'; Bistrović 89'; Moisés (yellow card) 90+' | Stadium: Lukoil Arena; Attendance: 39,018; Referee: Kirill Levnikov |

| 4 May 2025 27 | Fakel Voronezh | 0–0 | Spartak Moscow | Voronezh |
| 14:00 MSK (UTC+3) | Mertens (yellow card) 48'; Yakimov (yellow card) 90+' | Report | Litvinov (red card) 23'; Solari (yellow card) 52'; Abena (yellow card) 77' | Stadium: Fakel Stadium; Attendance: 9,745; Referee: Ranel Ziyakov |

| 11 May 2025 28 | Dynamo Moscow | 2–0 | Spartak Moscow | Moscow |
| 19:30 MSK (UTC+3) | Carrascal 7' (pen.); Glebov 30'; Cáceres (yellow card) 49'; Ngamaleu (yellow card) 70' | Report | Reabciuk (yellow card) 6'; Barco (yellow card) 21'; Duarte (yellow card) 39'; Khlusevich (yellow card) 52' | Stadium: VTB Arena; Attendance: 20,992; Referee: Aleksey Sukhoi |

| 18 May 2025 29 | Krylia Sovetov | 0–2 | Spartak Moscow | Samara |
| 13:30 MSK (UTC+3) | Bijl (red card) 10'; Fernando (yellow card) 17' (yellow-red card) 50' | Report | Mangas 22'; Solari 42' (pen.); Zobnin (yellow card) 80'; Chernov (yellow card) 90+' | Stadium: Solidarnost Samara Arena; Attendance: 22,589; Referee: Sergei Karasev |

| 24 May 2025 30 | Spartak Moscow | 5–0 | Khimki | Moscow |
| 16:30 MSK (UTC+3) | Umyarov 4'; Ugalde 36'; García 82'; Mangas 85'; Zobnin 89' | Report | Mejía (yellow card) 40'; Golubović (yellow card) 76' | Stadium: VTB Arena; Attendance: 16,702; Referee: Egor Egorov |

=== Russian Cup ===
==== Group stage ====
| Pos | Team | Pld | W | PW | PL | L | GF | GA | GD | Pts | Qualification |
|---|---|---|---|---|---|---|---|---|---|---|---|
| 1 | Spartak Moscow | 6 | 5 | 0 | 0 | 1 | 14 | 4 | +10 | 15 | Qualification to the Knockout phase (RPL path) |
| 2 | Dynamo Moscow | 6 | 3 | 1 | 0 | 2 | 17 | 13 | +4 | 11 | Qualification to the Knockout phase (RPL path) |
| 3 | Dynamo Makhachkala | 6 | 2 | 0 | 2 | 2 | 8 | 8 | 0 | 8 | Qualification to the Knockout phase (regions path) |
| 4 | Krylia Sovetov Samara | 6 | 0 | 1 | 0 | 5 | 8 | 22 | −14 | 2 | |

Source: Russian Football Union (in Russian), Soccerway
Rules for classification: 1) Points; 2) Head-to-head points; 3) Head-to-head matches won; 4) Head-to-head goal difference; 5) Head-to-head goals scored; 6) Matches won; 7) Goal difference; 8) Goals scored; 9) Penalty shoot-out goal difference; 10) Draw.

| 31 July 2024 1 | Spartak Moscow | 3–0 | Dynamo Moscow | Moscow |
| 18:30 MSK (UTC+3) | Ugalde 37'; Selikhov (yellow card) 64'; Medina 68' (pen.); Maslov 75' (yellow card) 90+2' | Report | Lepsky (yellow card) 40'; Kutitsky (yellow card) 50'; Ngamaleu (yellow card) 67'; Majstorović (yellow card) 90+3' | Stadium: Lukoil Arena; Attendance: 20,431; Referee: Vladimir Moskalyov |

| 14 August 2024 2 | Krylia Sovetov | 0–3 | Spartak Moscow | Samara |
| 19:30 MSK (UTC+3) | Yevgenyev (yellow card) 14'; Costanza (yellow card) 73' | Report | Litvinov (yellow card) 28'; Maslov (yellow card) 30'; Martins 64'; Medina 83'; Zorin 90+3' | Stadium: Solidarnost Samara Arena; Attendance: 20,040; Referee: Ivan Abrosimov |

| 27 August 2024 3 | Spartak Moscow | 0–1 | Dynamo Makhachkala | Moscow |
| 19:30 MSK (UTC+3) | Zobnin (yellow card) 16'; Ugalde (yellow card) 90'; Abena (yellow card) 90+4' | Report | Agalarov 14'; Mrezigue (yellow card) 30'; Gadzhiyev (yellow card) 44'; Sundukov (yellow card) 61'; Paltsev (yellow card) 90'; Volk (yellow card) 90+2' | Stadium: Lukoil Arena; Attendance: 19,419; Referee: Alexander Mashlyakevich |

| 19 September 2024 4 | Spartak Moscow | 4–1 | Krylia Sovetov | Moscow |
| 20:45 MSK (UTC+3) | Nicholson 2'; Zobnin 19'; Khlusevich (yellow card) 24'; Marquinhos (yellow card) 24'; Pyachenin 41' (o.g.); Mangas 89' | Report | Pyachenin (yellow card) 34' (yellow-red card) 86'; Shitov 68'; Costanza (yellow card) 70' | Stadium: Lukoil Arena; Attendance: 13,014; Referee: Roman Safyan |

| 2 October 2024 5 | Dynamo Moscow | 2–3 | Spartak Moscow | Moscow |
| 19:00 MSK (UTC+3) | Dasa 2'; Maouhoub (yellow card) 17' (goal) 20'; Balbuena (yellow card) 90'; Kutitsky (yellow card) 90+7' | Report | Barco 10' (pen.); Khlusevich (yellow card) 19'; Litvinov (yellow card) 56'; Martins 84'; Willian 90' | Stadium: VTB Arena; Attendance: 22,035; Referee: Vitali Meshkov |

| 22 October 2024 6 | Dynamo Makhachkala | 0–1 | Spartak Moscow | Kaspiysk |
| 18:30 MSK (UTC+3) | Kirsh (red card) 37'; Kagermazov (yellow card) 89' | Report | Zorin 48' (yellow card) 53' (yellow-red card) 85'; Mangas (yellow card) 75' | Stadium: Anzhi Arena; Attendance: 10,032; Referee: Pavel Shadykhanov |

==== Knockout phase ====
| 5 November 2024 RPL path Quarterfinals 1st leg | Spartak Moscow | 0–1 | Rostov | Moscow |
| 18:30 MSK (UTC+3) | Litvinov (yellow card) 9'; Barco (penalty missed) 44'; Umyarov (yellow card) 70'; Reabciuk (red card) 86' | Report | Zhbanov (yellow card) 16'; Melyokhin (yellow card) 43'; Shchetinin (yellow card) 45+2'; Mohebi 71' (pen.); Komarov (yellow card) 90+3' | Stadium: Lukoil Arena; Attendance: 9,393; Referee: Vasily Kazartsev |

| 27 November 2024 RPL path Quarterfinals 2nd leg | Rostov | 2–1 (3–1 agg.) | Spartak Moscow | Rostov |
| 20:30 MSK (UTC+3) | Golenkov 19'; Melyokhin 31'; Kuchayev (yellow card) 57'; Shchetinin (yellow card) 75' | Report | Zorin (yellow card) 41'; Martins 55'; Umyarov (yellow card) 85'; Marquinhos (yellow card) 90+2' | Stadium: Rostov Arena; Attendance: 26,990; Referee: Sergei Karasev |

| 12 March 2025 Regions path Quarter-finals Stage 2 | Akron Tolyatti | 2–3 | Spartak Moscow | Samara |
| 16:00 MSK (UTC+3) | Esanov 58' (pen.); Dzyuba 70' | Report | Martins 17', 59'; Bongonda 59' | Stadium: Solidarnost Samara Arena; Attendance: 2,960; Referee: Artyom Chistyakov |

| 15 April 2025 Regions path Semi-finals Stage 1 | Spartak Moscow | 3–0 | Ural Yekaterinburg | Moscow |
| 20:30 MSK (UTC+3) | Martins 6'; Marquinhos 28'; Barco 40' (pen.) | Report | Morozov (yellow card) 35'; Yegorychev (yellow card) 42'; Sungatulin (yellow card) 64' | Stadium: Lukoil Arena; Attendance: 26,103; Referee: Yevgeny Kukulyak |

| 29 April 2025 Regions path Semi-finals Stage 2 | Spartak Moscow | 2–1 | Dynamo Moscow | Moscow |
| 20:30 MSK (UTC+3) | Martins (yellow card) 11'; Marquinhos 14'; García 50'; Reabciuk (yellow card) 83' | Report | Fernández (yellow card) 9'; Denisov 20' (o.g.); Cáceres (yellow card) 25'; Balbuena (yellow card) 68' | Stadium: Lukoil Arena; Attendance: 31,195; Referee: Pavel Kukuyan |

| 15 May 2025 Regions path Final | Spartak Moscow | 1–2 | Rostov | Moscow |
| 20:00 MSK (UTC+3) | García 76'; Ugalde (yellow card) 47' (yellow-red card) 84'; Babić (yellow card) 90'; Umyarov (red card) 90+5' | Report | Ignatov (yellow card) 13'; Maksimenko 31' (o.g.); Komarov (yellow card) 69'; Komlichenko 78'; Bayramyan (yellow card) 90'; Yatimov (yellow card) 90+3' | Stadium: Lukoil Arena; Attendance: 36,085; Referee: Kirill Levnikov |

== Squad statistics ==
As of match played 24 May 2025

=== Appearances and goals ===
| No. | Pos | Nat | Player | Total | | Premier League | | Russian Cup | |
| No. | Pos | Nat | Player | Apps | Goals | Apps | Goals | Apps | Goals |
|---|---|---|---|---|---|---|---|---|---|
| 1 | GK | (Russia) RUS | Ilya Pomazun | 3 | 0 | 3 | 0 | 0 | 0 |
| 2 | DF | (Moldova) MDA | Oleg Reabciuk | 35 | 0 | 26+1 | 0 | 7+1 | 0 |
| 4 | DF | (Paraguay) PAR | Alexis Duarte | 19 | 0 | 12+3 | 0 | 3+1 | 0 |
| 5 | MF | (Argentina) ARG | Esequiel Barco | 36 | 14 | 27 | 12 | 5+4 | 2 |
| 6 | DF | (Serbia) SRB | Srđan Babić | 32 | 2 | 26 | 2 | 5+1 | 0 |
| 7 | FW | (Argentina) ARG | Pablo Solari | 15 | 2 | 2+9 | 2 | 1+3 | 0 |
| 8 | MF | (Brazil) BRA | Marquinhos | 36 | 2 | 20+6 | 0 | 8+2 | 2 |
| 9 | FW | (Costa Rica) CRC | Manfred Ugalde | 36 | 18 | 26+3 | 17 | 5+2 | 1 |
| 11 | FW | (Trinidad and Tobago) TTO | Levi García | 15 | 3 | 5+6 | 1 | 3+1 | 2 |
| 14 | DF | (Suriname) SUR | Myenty Abena | 12 | 0 | 4+3 | 0 | 4+1 | 0 |
| 16 | GK | (Russia) RUS | Aleksandr Dovbnya | 1 | 0 | 0+1 | 0 | 0 | 0 |
| 18 | MF | (Russia) RUS | Nail Umyarov | 34 | 3 | 27+1 | 3 | 5+1 | 0 |
| 19 | MF | (Paraguay) PAR | Jesús Medina | 24 | 3 | 6+12 | 1 | 3+3 | 2 |
| 22 | MF | (Russia) RUS | Mikhail Ignatov | 15 | 0 | 2+7 | 0 | 3+3 | 0 |
| 23 | DF | (Russia) RUS | Nikita Chernov | 11 | 0 | 4+4 | 0 | 1+2 | 0 |
| 25 | MF | (Russia) RUS | Danil Prutsev | 30 | 1 | 9+10 | 1 | 9+2 | 0 |
| 29 | DF | (Portugal) POR | Ricardo Mangas | 17 | 3 | 1+10 | 2 | 3+3 | 1 |
| 35 | MF | (Luxembourg) LUX | Christopher Martins | 33 | 9 | 16+7 | 3 | 8+2 | 6 |
| 47 | MF | (Russia) RUS | Roman Zobnin | 22 | 2 | 8+8 | 1 | 4+2 | 1 |
| 56 | MF | (Russia) RUS | Nikita Massalyga | 3 | 0 | 0+3 | 0 | 0 | 0 |
| 68 | DF | (Russia) RUS | Ruslan Litvinov | 31 | 0 | 17+4 | 0 | 10 | 0 |
| 74 | DF | (Russia) RUS | Yegor Guziyev | 2 | 0 | 0 | 0 | 0+2 | 0 |
| 77 | MF | (Democratic Republic of the Congo) COD | Théo Bongonda | 34 | 8 | 25+2 | 7 | 5+2 | 1 |
| 82 | MF | (Russia) RUS | Daniil Khlusevich | 18 | 0 | 8+5 | 0 | 5 | 0 |
| 97 | DF | (Russia) RUS | Daniil Denisov | 36 | 0 | 21+4 | 0 | 9+2 | 0 |
| 98 | GK | (Russia) RUS | Aleksandr Maksimenko | 31 | 0 | 27 | 0 | 4 | 0 |
Players away from the club on loan:
| 17 | MF | (Russia) RUS | Anton Zinkovsky | 13 | 0 | 3+4 | 0 | 3+3 | 0 |
| 28 | MF | (Russia) RUS | Daniil Zorin | 10 | 2 | 1+3 | 0 | 4+2 | 2 |
| 39 | DF | (Russia) RUS | Pavel Maslov | 3 | 1 | 0+1 | 0 | 1+1 | 1 |
Players who appeared for Spartak Moscow but left during the season:
| 7 | FW | (Russia) RUS | Aleksandr Sobolev | 1 | 0 | 1 | 0 | 0 | 0 |
| 11 | FW | (Jamaica) JAM | Shamar Nicholson | 14 | 4 | 3+6 | 3 | 3+2 | 1 |
| 12 | FW | (Brazil) BRA | Willian José | 13 | 1 | 0+7 | 0 | 3+3 | 1 |
| 57 | GK | (Russia) RUS | Aleksandr Selikhov | 8 | 0 | 0 | 0 | 8 | 0 |
| 70 | FW | (Russia) RUS | Pavel Melyoshin | 5 | 0 | 0+2 | 0 | 0+3 | 0 |

=== Goal scorers ===
| Place | Position | Nation | Number | Name | Premier League | Russian Cup | Total |
|---|---|---|---|---|---|---|---|
| 1 | FW | (Costa Rica) | 9 | Manfred Ugalde | 17 | 1 | 18 |
| 2 | MF | (Argentina) | 5 | Esequiel Barco | 12 | 2 | 14 |
| 3 | MF | (Luxembourg) | 35 | Christopher Martins | 3 | 6 | 9 |
| 4 | MF | (Democratic Republic of the Congo) | 77 | Théo Bongonda | 7 | 1 | 8 |
| 5 | FW | (Jamaica) | 11 | Shamar Nicholson | 3 | 1 | 4 |
| 6 | MF | (Russia) | 18 | Nail Umyarov | 3 | 0 | 3 |
| 6 | DF | (Portugal) | 29 | Ricardo Mangas | 2 | 1 | 3 |
| 6 | MF | (Paraguay) | 19 | Jesús Medina | 1 | 2 | 3 |
| 6 | FW | (Trinidad and Tobago) | 11 | Levi García | 1 | 2 | 3 |
| 10 | DF | (Serbia) | 6 | Srđan Babić | 2 | 0 | 2 |
| 10 | FW | (Argentina) | 7 | Pablo Solari | 2 | 0 | 2 |
| 10 | MF | (Russia) | 28 | Daniil Zorin | 0 | 2 | 2 |
| 10 | MF | (Brazil) | 8 | Marquinhos | 0 | 2 | 2 |
| 10 | MF | (Russia) | 47 | Roman Zobnin | 1 | 1 | 2 |
| 10 | | | | Own goal | 1 | 1 | 2 |
| 16 | MF | (Russia) | 25 | Danil Prutsev | 1 | 0 | 1 |
| 16 | DF | (Russia) | 39 | Pavel Maslov | 0 | 1 | 1 |
| 16 | FW | (Brazil) | 12 | Willian José | 0 | 1 | 1 |
| Total | | | | | 56 | 24 | 80 |

=== Clean sheets ===
| Place | Position | Nation | Number | Name | Premier League | Russian Cup | Total |
|---|---|---|---|---|---|---|---|
| 1 | GK | (Russia) | 98 | Aleksandr Maksimenko | 15 | 1 | 16 |
| 2 | GK | (Russia) | 57 | Aleksandr Selikhov | 0 | 3 | 3 |
| 3 | GK | (Russia) | 1 | Ilya Pomazun | 2 | 0 | 2 |
| 4 | GK | (Russia) | 16 | Aleksandr Dovbnya | 1 | 0 | 1 |
| Total | | | | | 17 | 4 | 21 |

Ilya Pomazun & Aleksandr Dovbnya both played in Spartak Moscow's 2-0 victory over Krylia Sovetov on 18 May 2025

=== Disciplinary record ===
| Number | Nation | Position | Name | Premier League | | Russian Cup | | Total | |
| Number | Nation | Position | Name | Yellow card | Red card | Yellow card | Red card | Yellow card | Red card |
|---|---|---|---|---|---|---|---|---|---|
| 2 | (Moldova) | DF | Oleg Reabciuk | 5 | 0 | 1 | 1 | 6 | 1 |
| 4 | (Paraguay) | DF | Alexis Duarte | 6 | 1 | 0 | 0 | 6 | 1 |
| 5 | (Argentina) | MF | Esequiel Barco | 5 | 0 | 0 | 0 | 5 | 0 |
| 6 | (Serbia) | DF | Srđan Babić | 10 | 1 | 1 | 0 | 11 | 1 |
| 7 | (Argentina) | FW | Pablo Solari | 5 | 0 | 0 | 0 | 5 | 0 |
| 8 | (Brazil) | MF | Marquinhos | 2 | 0 | 2 | 0 | 4 | 0 |
| 9 | (Costa Rica) | FW | Manfred Ugalde | 2 | 0 | 3 | 1 | 5 | 1 |
| 14 | (Suriname) | DF | Myenty Abena | 1 | 0 | 1 | 0 | 2 | 0 |
| 18 | (Russia) | MF | Nail Umyarov | 6 | 0 | 2 | 1 | 8 | 1 |
| 19 | (Paraguay) | MF | Jesús Medina | 2 | 0 | 0 | 0 | 2 | 0 |
| 23 | (Russia) | DF | Nikita Chernov | 1 | 0 | 0 | 0 | 1 | 0 |
| 25 | (Russia) | MF | Danil Prutsev | 1 | 0 | 0 | 0 | 1 | 0 |
| 29 | (Portugal) | DF | Ricardo Mangas | 0 | 0 | 1 | 0 | 1 | 0 |
| 35 | (Luxembourg) | MF | Christopher Martins | 6 | 0 | 1 | 0 | 7 | 0 |
| 39 | (Russia) | DF | Pavel Maslov | 0 | 0 | 2 | 0 | 2 | 0 |
| 47 | (Russia) | MF | Roman Zobnin | 4 | 1 | 1 | 0 | 5 | 1 |
| 68 | (Russia) | DF | Ruslan Litvinov | 3 | 2 | 3 | 0 | 6 | 2 |
| 77 | (Democratic Republic of the Congo) | MF | Théo Bongonda | 1 | 0 | 0 | 0 | 1 | 0 |
| 82 | (Russia) | MF | Daniil Khlusevich | 3 | 0 | 2 | 0 | 5 | 0 |
| 97 | (Russia) | DF | Daniil Denisov | 8 | 0 | 0 | 0 | 8 | 0 |
| 98 | (Russia) | GK | Aleksandr Maksimenko | 1 | 0 | 0 | 0 | 1 | 0 |
Players away on loan:
| 28 | (Russia) | MF | Daniil Zorin | 0 | 0 | 3 | 1 | 3 | 1 |
Players who left Spartak Moscow during the season:
| 11 | (Jamaica) | FW | Shamar Nicholson | 1 | 0 | 0 | 0 | 1 | 0 |
| 57 | (Russia) | GK | Aleksandr Selikhov | 0 | 0 | 1 | 0 | 1 | 0 |
| Total | | | | 73 | 5 | 24 | 4 | 97 | 9 |
