= Zobnin =

Zobnin (Russian: Зобнин) is a Russian surname. Notable people with the surname include:

- Aleksandr Zobnin (born 1989), Russian footballer, brother of Roman
- Roman Zobnin (born 1994), Russian footballer
