= Mikhail Volkov =

Russian footballer (born 2003)

Personal information
- Full name: Mikhail Antonovich Volkov
- Date of birth: 10 April 2003 (age 23)
- Place of birth: Saint Petersburg, Russia
- Height: 1.87 m (6 ft 2 in)
- Position: Goalkeeper

Team information
- Current team: Tekstilshchik Ivanovo
- Number: 95

Youth career
- –2017: Zenit Saint Petersburg
- 2018–2023: Spartak Moscow

Senior career*
Years	Team	Apps	(Gls)
2023–2026	Torpedo Moscow	10	(0)
2023	→ Torpedo-2	1	(0)
2026–	Tekstilshchik Ivanovo	0	(0)
- * Club domestic league appearances and goals as of 16 May 2026

Mikhail Antonovich Volkov (Russian: Михаил Антонович Волков; born 10 April 2003) is a Russian footballer who plays as a goalkeeper for Tekstilshchik Ivanovo.

== Club career ==
Volkov was the third goalkeeper of Spartak Moscow in the 2022–23 season, behind Aleksandr Maksimenko and Aleksandr Selikhov and was on the bench in most of their games, including the 2022 Russian Super Cup.

He made his professional debut in the Russian Second League for Torpedo-2 on 29 October 2023 in a game against Torpedo Vladimir.

On 21 April 2025, he made his debut in the Russian First League for Torpedo Moscow in a match against Ural Yekaterinburg.

== Career statistics ==
As of 24 May 2025

Club	Season	League			Cup		Continental		Other		Total	
Club	Season	Division	Apps	Goals	Apps	Goals	Apps	Goals	Apps	Goals	Apps	Goals
Spartak-2 Moscow	2020–21	Russian First League	0	0	–		–		–		0	0
Spartak Moscow	2021–22	Russian Premier League	0	0	0	0	–		–		0	0
Spartak Moscow	2022–23	Russian Premier League	0	0	0	0	–		0	0	0	0
Spartak Moscow	Total		0	0	0	0	0	0	0	0	0	0
Torpedo Moscow	2023–24	Russian First League	0	0	0	0	–		–		0	0
Torpedo Moscow	2024–25	Russian First League	6	0	1	0	–		–		7	0
Torpedo Moscow	Total		6	0	1	0	0	0	0	0	7	0
Torpedo-2	2023	Russian Second League B	1	0	–		–		–		1	0
Career total			7	0	1	0	0	0	0	0	8	0
