= Aleksandr Dovbnya =

Aleksandr Dovbnya may refer to:

- Aleksandr Dovbnya (footballer, born 1987), Russian football goalkeeper
- Aleksandr Dovbnya (footballer, born 1996), Russian football defender
