= Pavel Polekh =

Russian footballer (born 2009)

Personal information
- Full name: Pavel Vladimirovich Polekh
- Date of birth: 2 December 2009 (age 16)
- Place of birth: Tomsk, Russia
- Height: 1.74 m (5 ft 9 in)
- Position: Left winger

Team information
- Current team: Spartak Moscow; Spartak-2 Moscow
- Number: 62

Youth career
- Spartak Moscow

Senior career*
Years	Team	Apps	(Gls)
2026–	Spartak Moscow	3	(0)
2026–	Spartak-2 Moscow	12	(1)

International career^{‡}
2025	Russia U16	4	(1)
2025–	Russia U17	10	(5)
- * Club domestic league appearances and goals as of 1 November 2026 ‡ National team caps and goals as of 23 February 2026

Pavel Vladimirovich Polekh (Russian: Павел Владимирович Полех; born 2 December 2009) is a Russian football player who plays as a left winger for Spartak Moscow and Spartak-2 Moscow.

== Career ==
Polekh made his debut in the Russian Premier League for Spartak Moscow on 22 March 2026 in a game against Orenburg. He was 16 years, 3 months and 20 days old on that day and became the second-youngest player to ever play for Spartak, behind Aleksei Rebko.

On 5 August 2026, Polekh scored his first goal for Spartak in a Russian Cup game against Orenburg and became the youngest goal scorer in club's history (at the age of 16 years, 8 months and 3 days), taking the record previously held by Jano Ananidze.

== Career statistics ==
As of 28 October 2026

Club	Season	League			Cup		Total	
Club	Season	Division	Apps	Goals	Apps	Goals	Apps	Goals
Spartak Moscow	2025–26	Russian Premier League	2	0	0	0	2	0
Spartak Moscow	2026–27	Russian Premier League	1	0	3	1	4	1
Spartak Moscow	Total		3	0	3	1	6	1
Spartak-2 Moscow	2026	Russian Second League B	12	1	—		12	1
Career total			15	1	3	1	18	2
