= Ivan Sorokin (footballer) =

Russian footballer (born 2008)

Personal information
- Full name: Ivan Sergeyevich Sorokin
- Date of birth: 7 June 2008 (age 18)
- Place of birth: Ishim, Russia
- Height: 1.90 m (6 ft 3 in)
- Positions: Central midfielder; centre-forward

Team information
- Current team: Spartak Moscow; Spartak-2 Moscow
- Number: 40

Youth career
- –2018: Tyumen
- 2018–2022: Zenit St. Petersburg
- 2022–2023: SShOR-1 Moskovsky Rayon St. Petersburg
- 2023–2024: Zenit St. Petersburg
- 2025: Spartak Moscow

Senior career*
Years	Team	Apps	(Gls)
2025–	Spartak-2 Moscow	23	(1)
2026–	Spartak Moscow	2	(0)

International career^{‡}
2025	Russia U18	1	(0)
- * Club domestic league appearances and goals as of 1 November 2026 ‡ National team caps and goals as of 15 November 2025

Ivan Sergeyevich Sorokin (Russian: Иван Сергеевич Сорокин; born 7 June 2008) is a Russian football player who plays as a central midfielder or a centre-forward for Spartak Moscow and Spartak-2 Moscow.

== Career ==
Sorokin spent most of his junior career at the Zenit St. Petersburg academy before joining Spartak Moscow in early 2025 and making his senior debut for Spartak's reserve team in the fourth-tier Russian Second League Division B.

Sorokin made his debut for the main squad of Spartak on 5 August 2026 in a Russian Cup game against Orenburg. He made his Russian Premier League debut on 6 September 2026 in an oldest Russian derby game against Dynamo Moscow. He came off the bench in the 84th minute and scored an equalizer 5 minutes later, however, the goal was cancelled for off-side position after a VAR review, the game ended in Spartak's loss.

== Career statistics ==
As of 1 November 2026

Club	Season	League			Cup		Total	
Club	Season	Division	Apps	Goals	Apps	Goals	Apps	Goals
Spartak-2 Moscow	2025	Russian Second League B	11	1	—		11	1
Spartak-2 Moscow	2026	Russian Second League B	12	0	—		12	0
Spartak-2 Moscow	Total		23	1	0	0	23	1
Spartak Moscow	2025–26	Russian Premier League	0	0	0	0	0	0
Spartak Moscow	2026–27	Russian Premier League	2	0	4	0	6	0
Spartak Moscow	Total		2	0	4	0	6	0
Career total			25	1	4	0	29	1
