= Aleksandr Dovbnya (footballer, born 1987) =

Russian footballer

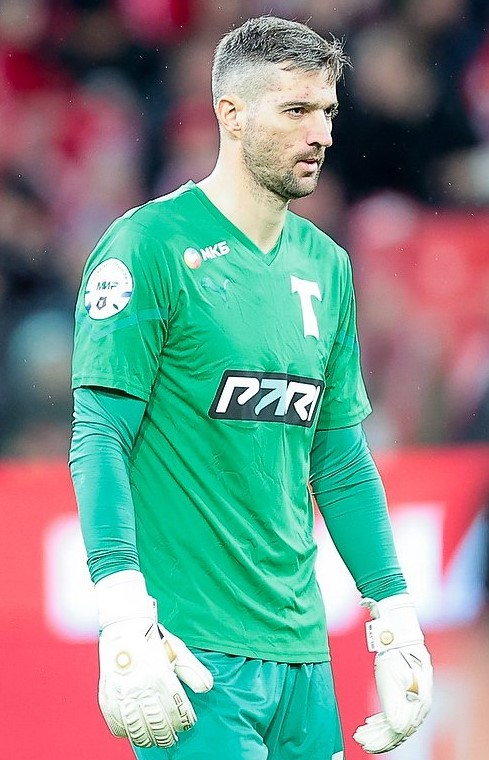
- Dovbnya with Torpedo Moscow in 2022

Personal information
- Full name: Aleksandr Vyacheslavovich Dovbnya
- Date of birth: 14 April 1987 (age 39)
- Place of birth: Moscow, Russian SFSR, Soviet Union
- Height: 1.93 m (6 ft 4 in)
- Position: Goalkeeper

Team information
- Current team: Spartak Moscow
- Number: 56

Youth career
- Spartak-2 Moscow

Senior career*
Years	Team	Apps	(Gls)
2007–2008	Haka	52	(0)
2009	Sibir Novosibirsk	0	(0)
2010	Nizhny Novgorod	0	(0)
2011	Podolye	24	(0)
2012–2013	Torpedo Moscow	27	(0)
2013	→ Luch-Energiya Vladivostok (loan)	10	(0)
2013–2016	Luch-Energiya Vladivostok	41	(0)
2016–2018	SKA-Khabarovsk	42	(0)
2018–2020	Orenburg	13	(0)
2020	Rotor Volgograd	6	(0)
2021–2023	Torpedo Moscow	14	(0)
2023–2024	Shinnik Yaroslavl	33	(0)
2024–	Spartak Moscow	1	(0)
- * Club domestic league appearances and goals as of 18 May 2025

Aleksandr Vyacheslavovich Dovbnya (Russian: Александр Вячеславович Довбня; born 14 April 1987) is a Russian professional football goalkeeper who plays for Spartak Moscow.

== Club career ==
Having begun his professional career in Finland, Dovbnya's current club is Spartak Moscow, Russia's most successful club. He had signed a one-year contract with what was his boyhood team on 26 July 2024.

On 1 July 2026, Dovbnya extended his contract with Spartak for the 2026–27 season.

== Career statistics ==
As of 18 May 2025

Club	Season	League			Cup		Continental		Other		Total	
Club	Season	Division	Apps	Goals	Apps	Goals	Apps	Goals	Apps	Goals	Apps	Goals
Haka	2007	Veikkausliiga	26	0	–		4 (Note: Appearances in the UEFA Cup)	0	–		30	0
Haka	2008	Veikkausliiga	26	0	2	0	4	0	–		32	0
Haka	Total		52	0	2	0	8	0	0	0	62	0
Nizhny Novgorod	2010	First League	0	0	0	0	–		–		0	0
Podolye	2011–12	Second League	24	0	1	0	–		–		25	0
Torpedo Moscow	2011–12	First League	3	0	–		–		–		3	0
Torpedo Moscow	2012–13	First League	24	0	1	0	–		–		25	0
Luch-Energiya	2013–14	First League	19	0	5	0	–		2 (Note: Appearances in the FNL Cup)	0	26	0
Luch-Energiya	2014–15	First League	15	0	0	0	–		3	0	18	0
Luch-Energiya	2015–16	First League	17	0	0	0	–		–		17	0
Luch-Energiya	Total		51	0	5	0	0	0	5	0	61	0
SKA-Khabarovsk	2016–17	First League	16	0	3	0	–		4 (Note: Two appearances in the promotion play-offs, two appearances in the FNL Cup)	0	23	0
SKA-Khabarovsk	2017–18	Premier League	26	0	0	0	–		–		26	0
SKA-Khabarovsk	Total		42	0	3	0	0	0	4	0	49	0
Orenburg	2018–19	Premier League	8	0	2	0	–		–		10	0
Orenburg	2019–20	Premier League	5	0	1	0	–		–		6	0
Orenburg	Total		13	0	3	0	0	0	0	0	16	0
Rotor Volgograd	2020–21	Premier League	6	0	1	0	–		–		7	0
Torpedo Moscow	2020–21	First League	5	0	–		–		–		5	0
Torpedo Moscow	2021–22	First League	3	0	3	0	–		–		6	0
Torpedo Moscow	2022–23	Premier League	6	0	5	0	–		–		11	0
Torpedo Moscow	Total (2 spells)		41	0	9	0	0	0	0	0	50	0
Shinnik Yaroslavl	2023–24	First League	33	0	0	0	–		–		33	0
Spartak Moscow	2024–25	Premier League	1	0	0	0	–		–		1	0
Career total			263	0	24	0	8	0	9	0	304	0

== Honours ==
Torpedo Moscow

- Russian Football National League : 2021-22
