= Nikita Massalyga =

Russian footballer (born 2007)

Personal information
- Full name: Nikita Alekseyevich Massalyga
- Date of birth: 9 October 2007 (age 19)
- Place of birth: Krasnoyarsk, Russia
- Height: 1.87 m (6 ft 2 in)
- Position: Right winger

Team information
- Current team: Spartak Moscow
- Number: 24

Youth career
- –2023: Yenisey Krasnoyarsk
- 2023–: Spartak Moscow

Senior career*
Years	Team	Apps	(Gls)
2025–	Spartak Moscow	9	(1)
2025–	→ Spartak-2 Moscow	14	(2)

International career^{‡}
2023	Russia U17	1	(0)
- * Club domestic league appearances and goals as of 1 November 2026 ‡ National team caps and goals as of 12 October 2023

Nikita Alekseyevich Massalyga (Russian: Никита Алексеевич Массалыга; born 9 October 2007) is a Russian football player who plays as a right winger for Spartak Moscow and Spartak-2 Moscow.

== Career ==
Massalyga made his debut in the Russian Premier League for Spartak Moscow on 19 April 2025 in a game against Akron Tolyatti.

== Career statistics ==
As of 1 November 2026

Club	Season	League			Cup		Total	
Club	Season	Division	Apps	Goals	Apps	Goals	Apps	Goals
Spartak Moscow	2024–25	Russian Premier League	3	0	0	0	3	0
Spartak Moscow	2025–26	Russian Premier League	4	0	5	1	9	1
Spartak Moscow	2026–27	Russian Premier League	2	1	2	0	4	1
Spartak Moscow	Total		9	1	7	1	16	2
Spartak-2 Moscow	2025	Russian Second League B	10	1	—		10	1
Spartak-2 Moscow	2026	Russian Second League B	4	1	—		4	1
Spartak-2 Moscow	Total		14	2	0	0	14	2
Career total			23	3	7	1	30	4

== Honours ==
Spartak Moscow

- Russian Cup: 2025–26
