= Daniil Denisov =

Russian footballer

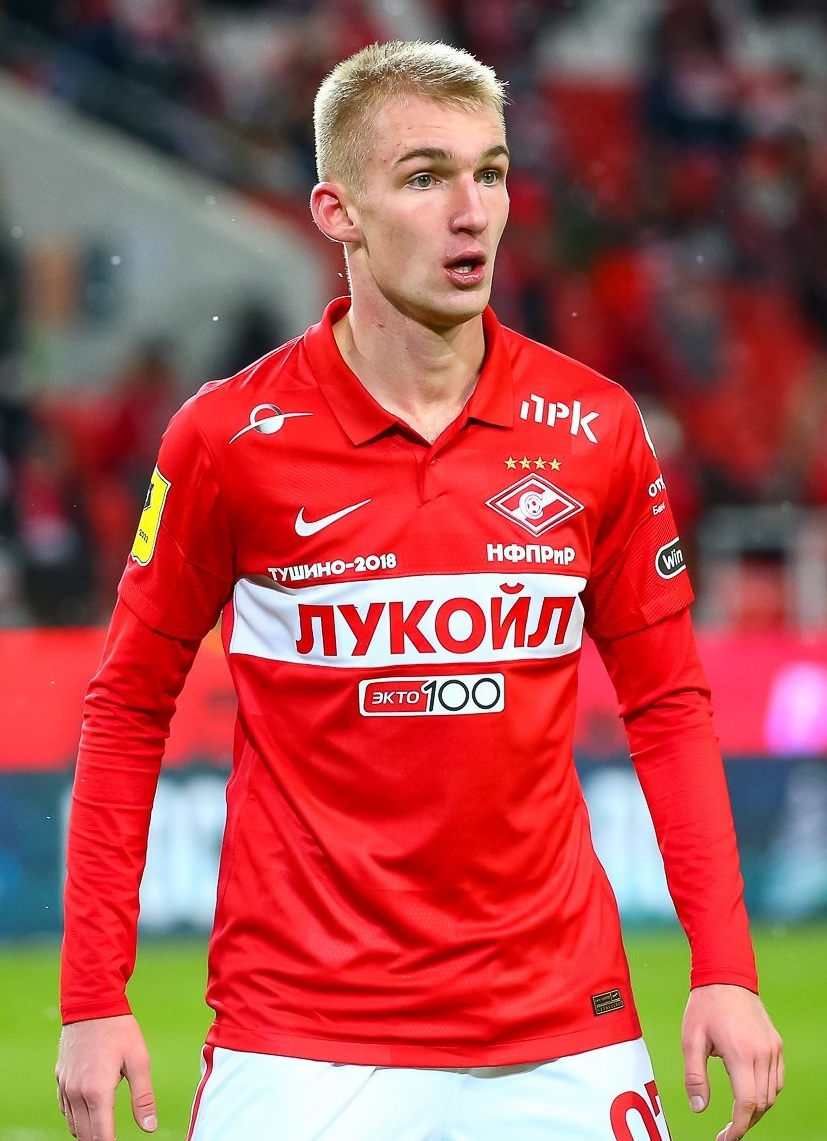
- Denisov with Spartak Moscow in 2021

Personal information
- Full name: Daniil Sergeyevich Denisov
- Date of birth: 21 October 2002 (age 24)
- Place of birth: Saint Petersburg, Russia
- Height: 1.84 m (6 ft 0 in)
- Position: Right-back

Team information
- Current team: FC Spartak Moscow
- Number: 97

Youth career
- 2009–2019: SShOR Zenit Saint Petersburg
- 2019–2020: Spartak Moscow

Senior career*
Years	Team	Apps	(Gls)
2020–2022	Spartak-2 Moscow	54	(0)
2021–	Spartak Moscow	122	(1)

International career^{‡}
2019	Russia U17	5	(0)
2019	Russia U18	6	(0)
2022	Russia U21	3	(0)
2023–	Russia	1	(0)
- * Club domestic league appearances and goals as of 22 November 2026 ‡ National team caps and goals as of 16 November 2022

Daniil Sergeyevich Denisov (Russian: Дании́л Серге́евич Дени́сов; born 21 October 2002) is a Russian football player who plays for FC Spartak Moscow.

== Club career ==
He made his debut in the Russian Football National League for FC Spartak-2 Moscow on 1 August 2020 in a game against FC Chertanovo Moscow, as a starter.

He made his Russian Premier League debut for FC Spartak Moscow on 3 October 2021 in a game against FC Akhmat Grozny.

On 7 February 2022, Denisov extended his contract with Spartak until May 2026. He scored his first goal for the club on 27 August 2022 in a 4–1 victory over FC Fakel Voronezh.

On 5 February 2026, Denisov extended his Spartak contract to June 2030.

== International ==
Denisov played for Russia Under-17 team at the 2019 UEFA European Under-17 Championship, as Russia lost all three group games and was eliminated.

He was called up to the Russia national football team for the first time in March 2023 for a training camp. He made his debut on 26 March 2023 in a friendly against Iraq.

== Career statistics ==
=== Club ===
As of match played 22 November 2026

Appearances and goals by club, season and competition
Club	Season	League			Cup		Europe		Other		Total	
Club	Season	Division	Apps	Goals	Apps	Goals	Apps	Goals	Apps	Goals	Apps	Goals
Spartak-2 Moscow	2020–21	Russian First League	34	0	—		—		—		34	0
Spartak-2 Moscow	2021–22	Russian First League	20	0	—		—		—		20	0
Spartak-2 Moscow	Total		54	0	—		—		—		54	0
Spartak Moscow	2021–22	Russian Premier League	6	0	2	0	0	0	—		8	0
Spartak Moscow	2022–23	Russian Premier League	29	1	11	0	—		1 (Note: Appearances in the Russian Super Cup)	0	41	1
Spartak Moscow	2023–24	Russian Premier League	20	0	9	0	—		—		29	0
Spartak Moscow	2024–25	Russian Premier League	25	0	11	0	—		—		36	0
Spartak Moscow	2025–26	Russian Premier League	29	0	13	0	—		—		42	0
Spartak Moscow	2026–27	Russian Premier League	13	0	4	0	—		1	0	18	0
Spartak Moscow	Total		122	1	50	0	0	0	2	0	174	1
Career total			176	1	50	0	0	0	2	0	228	1

=== International ===
As of match played 26 March 2023

Appearances and goals by national team and year
National team	Year	Apps	Goals
Russia	2023	1	0
Total		1	0

== Honours ==
Spartak Moscow

- Russian Cup: 2021–22, 2025–26
