= Nikolai Tolstopyatov =

Russian footballer

Personal information
- Full name: Nikolai Valeriyevich Tolstopyatov
- Date of birth: 12 May 2002 (age 24)
- Place of birth: Zaozerne, Yevpatoria municipality, Crimea, Ukraine
- Height: 1.95 m (6 ft 5 in)
- Position: Defender

Youth career
- –2017: DYuSSh Yevpatoria
- 2018–2021: Spartak Moscow

Senior career*
Years	Team	Apps	(Gls)
2021–2024	Spartak Moscow	0	(0)
2021–2022	Spartak-2 Moscow	18	(0)
2022–2023	→ KAMAZ Naberezhnye Chelny (loan)	25	(0)
2023	→ Pari Nizhny Novgorod (loan)	3	(0)
2024	→ Sokol Saratov (loan)	5	(0)
2024–2026	Neftekhimik Nizhnekamsk	58	(1)
- * Club domestic league appearances and goals as of 16 May 2026

Nikolai Valeriyevich Tolstopyatov (Russian: Никола́й Вале́риевич Толстопя́тов; born 12 May 2002) is a Russian football player.

== Club career ==
He made his debut in the Russian Football National League for Spartak-2 Moscow on 17 July 2021 in a game against Torpedo Moscow.

On 8 July 2022, Tolstopyatov joined KAMAZ Naberezhnye Chelny.

On 5 July 2023, Tolstopyatov moved on loan to Pari Nizhny Novgorod, with an option to buy. He made his Russian Premier League debut for Pari NN on 26 August 2023 against Rostov. On 5 February 2024, Tolstopyatov moved to Sokol Saratov.

On 24 June 2024, Tolstopyatov joined Neftekhimik Nizhnekamsk.
