= Daniil Zorin =

Russian footballer (born 2004)

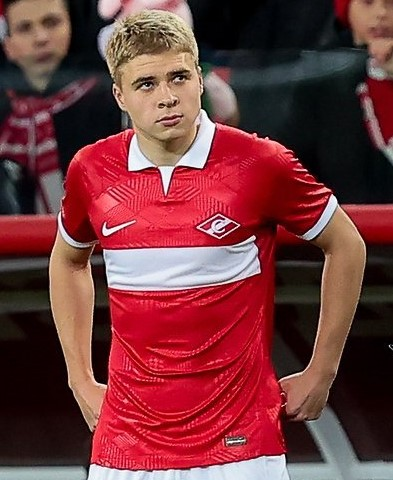
- Zorin with Spartak Moscow in 2022

Personal information
- Full name: Daniil Alekseyevich Zorin
- Date of birth: 22 February 2004 (age 22)
- Place of birth: Moscow, Russia
- Height: 1.80 m (5 ft 11 in)
- Position: Midfielder

Team information
- Current team: Spartak Moscow
- Number: 28

Youth career
- Spartak Moscow

Senior career*
| Years | Team | Apps | (Gls) |
| 2022– | Spartak Moscow | 8 | (0) |
| 2023 | → Dinamo Minsk (loan) | 11 | (7) |
| 2025 | → Akhmat Grozny (loan) | 10 | (1) |

International career^{‡}
| 2019–2020 | Russia U16 | 4 | (0) |
| 2021 | Russia U17 | 2 | (1) |
| 2021 | Russia U18 | 3 | (3) |
| 2023 | Russia U19 | 1 | (0) |
| 2023–2025 | Russia U21 | 7 | (0) |
- * Club domestic league appearances and goals as of 28 September 2025 ‡ National team caps and goals as of 23 March 2025

Daniil Alekseyevich Zorin (Russian: Дании́л Алексе́евич Зо́рин; born 22 February 2004) is a Russian footballer who plays as a midfielder for Spartak Moscow.

== Club career ==
Zorin made his debut for Spartak Moscow on 19 October 2022 in a Russian Cup game against Fakel Voronezh. He made his Russian Premier League debut for Spartak on 23 October 2022 against FC Khimki.

On 4 August 2023, Zorin joined Dinamo Minsk in Belarus on loan until the end of 2023.

On 20 February 2025, Zorin moved on loan to Akhmat Grozny. At the same time, he extended his contract with Spartak to June 2028. On 31 May 2025, Zorin scored a goal in added time that secured Akhmat's victory over Ural Yekaterinburg in the relegation play-offs and Akhmat's place in the Russian Premier League.

== Career statistics ==
As of match played 1 October 2025

Appearances and goals by club, season and competition
| Club | Season | League | | | Cup | | Other | | Total | |
| Club | Season | Division | Apps | Goals | Apps | Goals | Apps | Goals | Apps | Goals |
|---|---|---|---|---|---|---|---|---|---|---|
| Spartak Moscow | 2022–23 | Russian Premier League | 2 | 0 | 4 | 0 | — | | 6 | 0 |
| Spartak Moscow | 2023–24 | Russian Premier League | 0 | 0 | 0 | 0 | — | | 0 | 0 |
| Spartak Moscow | 2024–25 | Russian Premier League | 4 | 0 | 6 | 2 | — | | 10 | 2 |
| Spartak Moscow | 2025–26 | Russian Premier League | 2 | 0 | 4 | 1 | — | | 6 | 1 |
| Spartak Moscow | Total | | 8 | 0 | 14 | 3 | 0 | 0 | 22 | 3 |
| Dinamo Minsk (loan) | 2023 | Belarusian Premier League | 11 | 7 | — | | — | | 11 | 7 |
| Akhmat Grozny (loan) | 2024–25 | Russian Premier League | 10 | 1 | 2 | 0 | 2 (Note: Appearances in relegation play-offs) | 1 | 14 | 2 |
| Career total | | | 29 | 8 | 16 | 3 | 2 | 1 | 47 | 13 |

== Honours ==
Dinamo Minsk

- Belarusian Premier League: 2023

Spartak Moscow

- Russian Cup: 2025–26
