= Vladislav Shitov =

Russian footballer

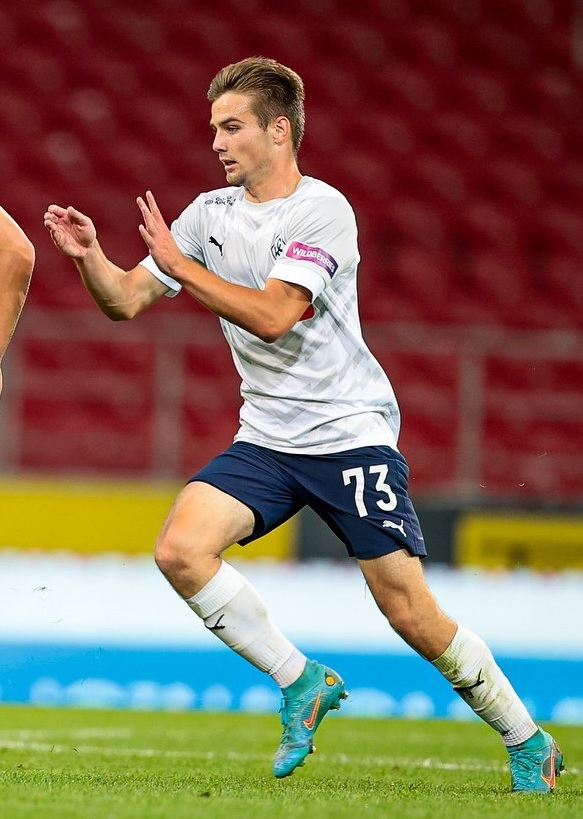
- Shitov with Krylia Sovetov in 2022

Personal information
- Full name: Vladislav Alekseyevich Shitov
- Date of birth: 7 May 2003 (age 23)
- Place of birth: Yaroslavl, Russia
- Height: 1.77 m (5 ft 9 1/2 in)
- Position: Forward

Team information
- Current team: Krylia Sovetov Samara
- Number: 73

Youth career
- Spartak Moscow

Senior career*
Years	Team	Apps	(Gls)
2020–2022	Spartak-2 Moscow	51	(18)
2021–2022	Spartak Moscow	2	(0)
2022	→ Krylia Sovetov Samara (loan)	11	(2)
2023–	Krylia Sovetov Samara	72	(6)
2025–2026	→ Torpedo Moscow (loan)	24	(3)

International career^{‡}
2018	Russia U-15	7	(1)
2018	Russia U-16	5	(2)
2019–2020	Russia U-17	6	(0)
2021	Russia U-18	4	(1)
2021	Russia U-19	6	(2)
2022	Russia U-21	3	(1)
- * Club domestic league appearances and goals as of 20 November 2026 ‡ National team caps and goals as of 16 November 2022

Vladislav Alekseyevich Shitov (Russian: Владислав Алексеевич Шитов; born 7 May 2003) is a Russian football player who plays as a centre-forward for Krylia Sovetov Samara.

== Club career ==
Shitov made his debut in the Russian Football National League for Spartak-2 Moscow on 22 August 2020 in a game against Irtysh Omsk. He was substituted in at the 60th minute and scored twice in the remaining half-hour.

He made his Russian Premier League debut for Spartak Moscow on 13 December 2021 against Sochi.

On 15 July 2022, Shitov joined Krylia Sovetov Samara on a season-long loan. On 23 February 2023, Krylia Sovetov bought out his rights from Spartak and signed a 3.5-year contract with Shitov.

On 11 September 2025, Shitov was loaned by Torpedo Moscow.

== International career ==
Shitov was first called up to the Russia national football team for September 2023 camp.

== Personal life ==
His twin brother Vitali Shitov is also football player.

== Career statistics ==
As of match played 20 November 2026

Appearances and goals by club, season and competition
Club	Season	League			Cup		Europe		Other		Total	
Club	Season	Division	Apps	Goals	Apps	Goals	Apps	Goals	Apps	Goals	Apps	Goals
Spartak-2 Moscow	2020–21	Russian First League	23	5	—		—		—		23	5
Spartak-2 Moscow	2021–22	Russian First League	28	13	—		—		—		28	13
Spartak-2 Moscow	Total		51	18	0	0	0	0	—		51	18
Spartak Moscow	2021–22	Russian Premier League	2	0	0	0	0	0	0	0	2	0
Krylia Sovetov Samara (loan)	2022–23	Russian Premier League	11	2	6	0	—		—		17	2
Krylia Sovetov Samara	2022–23	Russian Premier League	12	0	5	0	—		—		17	0
Krylia Sovetov Samara	2023–24	Russian Premier League	24	4	5	0	—		—		29	4
Krylia Sovetov Samara	2024–25	Russian Premier League	24	1	6	1	—		—		30	2
Krylia Sovetov Samara	2025–26	Russian Premier League	1	0	0	0	—		—		1	0
Krylia Sovetov Samara	2026–27	Russian Premier League	11	1	5	0	—		—		16	1
Krylia Sovetov Samara	Total		72	6	21	1	—		—		93	7
Krylia Sovetov Samara	Club total		83	8	26	1	—		—		109	9
Torpedo Moscow (loan)	2025–26	Russian First League	24	3	4	3	—		—		28	6
Career total			160	29	31	4	0	0	0	0	191	33
