= Roman Zobnin =

Russian footballer (born 1994)

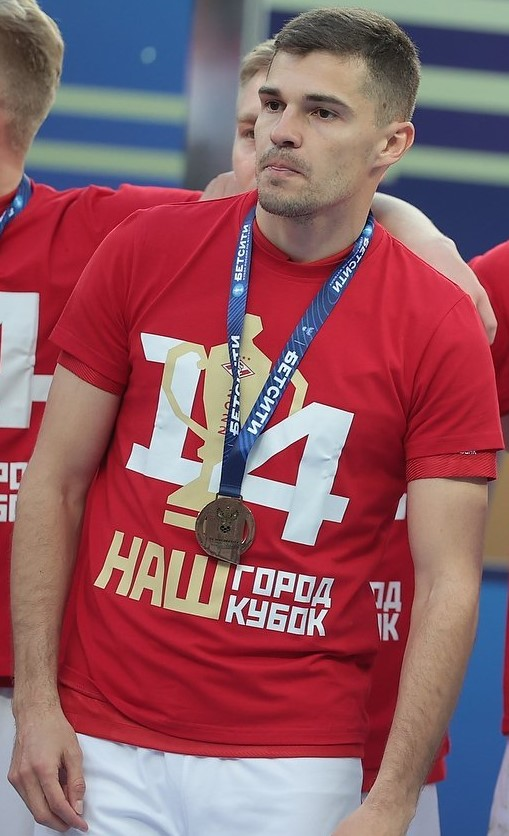
- Zobnin playing for Spartak Moscow in 2022

Personal information
- Full name: Roman Sergeyevich Zobnin
- Date of birth: 11 February 1994 (age 32)
- Place of birth: Irkutsk, Russia
- Height: 1.82 m (6 ft 0 in)
- Position: Midfielder

Team information
- Current team: Spartak Moscow
- Number: 47

Youth career
- Zvezda Irkutsk
- 2004–2010: Konoplyov football academy

Senior career*
Years	Team	Apps	(Gls)
2011–2013	Akademiya Tolyatti	23	(0)
2013–2016	Dynamo Moscow	48	(2)
2016–	Spartak Moscow	254	(20)

International career^{‡}
2009–2010	Russia U16	11	(0)
2010–2011	Russia U17	15	(0)
2012	Russia U18	8	(1)
2012–2013	Russia U19	13	(0)
2015–2016	Russia U21	4	(0)
2015–2021	Russia	41	(0)
- * Club domestic league appearances and goals as of 22 November 2026 ‡ National team caps and goals as of 14 November 2021

Roman Sergeyevich Zobnin (Russian: Роман Сергеевич Зобнин, IPA: [rɐˈman sʲɪrˈɡʲe(j)ɪvʲɪdʑ ˈzobnʲɪn]; born 11 February 1994) is a Russian professional footballer who plays as a central midfielder for Spartak Moscow. He also plays as a right midfielder.

== Club career ==
He made his debut in the Russian Second Division for Akademiya Tolyatti on 30 April 2011 in a game against FC Ufa.

His Russian Premier League debut came on 19 July 2013, while playing for Dynamo Moscow in a match against Anzhi Makhachkala.

On 15 June 2016, following Dynamo's shock relegation from the Premier League, he moved to Spartak Moscow.

He won the Premier League with his team in 2017, as well as the Super Cup. In 2022, he won the Russian Cup.

On 26 December 2025, Zobnin extended his Spartak contract to June 2027.

== International career ==
On 31 March 2015, Zobnin made his debut for the Russia national football team in a friendly game against Kazakhstan.

On 11 May 2018, he was named in Russia's extended 2018 FIFA World Cup squad, also being included in the finalized World Cup squad. He played every minute of every game for the squad as Russia was eventually eliminated in a quarter-final penalty shoot-out by Croatia.

On 11 May 2021, he was included in the preliminary extended 30-man squad for UEFA Euro 2020. On 2 June 2021, he was included in the final squad. He started Russia's opening game against Belgium on 12 June 2021 and was substituted in the 63rd minute as Russia lost 0–3. He played a full match in both Russia's second game against Finland on 16 June in a 1–0 victory and on 21 June in the last group game against Denmark as Russia lost 1–4 and was eliminated.

== Career statistics ==
=== Club ===
As of match played 22 November 2026

Appearances and goals by club, season and competition
Club	Season	League			Cup		Europe		Other		Total	
Club	Season	Division	Apps	Goals	Apps	Goals	Apps	Goals	Apps	Goals	Apps	Goals
Akademiya Tolyatti	2010	Russian Second League	0	0	0	0	—		—		0	0
Akademiya Tolyatti	2011–12	Russian Second League	13	0	0	0	—		—		13	0
Akademiya Tolyatti	2012–13	Russian Second League	10	0	0	0	—		—		10	0
Akademiya Tolyatti	Total		23	0	0	0	—		—		23	0
Dynamo Moscow	2013–14	Russian Premier League	4	0	1	0	—		—		5	0
Dynamo Moscow	2014–15	Russian Premier League	15	1	0	0	1 (Note: Appearances in the UEFA Europa League)	0	—		16	1
Dynamo Moscow	2015–16	Russian Premier League	29	1	3	0	—		—		32	1
Dynamo Moscow	Total		48	2	4	0	1	0	—		53	2
Spartak Moscow	2016–17	Russian Premier League	29	2	1	0	2	0	—		32	2
Spartak Moscow	2017–18	Russian Premier League	14	0	2	0	4 (Note: Two appearances in the UEFA Champions League, two appearances in the UEFA Europa League)	0	—		20	0
Spartak Moscow	2018–19	Russian Premier League	26	1	1	0	6 (Note: Two appearances in the UEFA Champions League, four appearances in the UEFA Europa League)	0	—		33	1
Spartak Moscow	2019–20	Russian Premier League	25	2	3	0	4	0	—		32	2
Spartak Moscow	2020–21	Russian Premier League	28	1	2	1	—		—		30	2
Spartak Moscow	2021–22	Russian Premier League	25	3	2	0	6 (Note: Two appearances in the UEFA Champions League, four appearances in the UEFA Europa League)	0	—		33	3
Spartak Moscow	2022–23	Russian Premier League	29	4	11	1	—		1 (Note: Appearances in the Russian Super Cup)	0	41	5
Spartak Moscow	2023–24	Russian Premier League	22	2	7	1	—		—		29	3
Spartak Moscow	2024–25	Russian Premier League	16	1	6	1	—		—		22	2
Spartak Moscow	2025–26	Russian Premier League	25	2	11	1	—		—		36	3
Spartak Moscow	2026–27	Russian Premier League	15	2	3	1	—		1	0	19	3
Spartak Moscow	Total		254	20	49	6	22	0	2	0	327	26
Career total			325	22	53	6	23	0	2	0	401	28

=== International ===
Statistics accurate as of match played 14 November 2021.

Russia
Year	Apps	Goals
2015	1	0
2016	5	0
2017	3	0
2018	12	0
2019	6	0
2020	6	0
2021	8	0
Total	41	0

== Honours ==
Spartak Moscow

- Russian Premier League: 2016–17
- Russian Cup: 2021–22, 2025–26
- Russian Super Cup: 2017

== Personal life ==
His older brother Aleksandr Zobnin also played football professionally.
