= Pavel Melyoshin =

Russian footballer (born 2004)

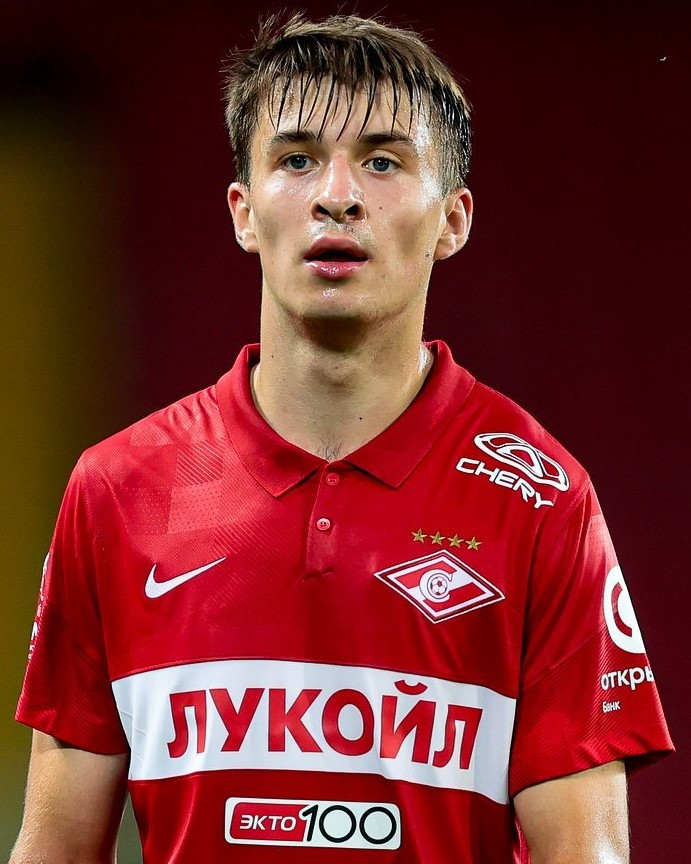
- Melyoshin with Spartak Moscow in 2022

Personal information
- Full name: Pavel Alekseyevich Melyoshin
- Date of birth: 25 March 2004 (age 22)
- Place of birth: Shchyolkovo, Moscow Oblast, Russia
- Height: 1.88 m (6 ft 2 in)
- Position: Forward

Team information
- Current team: Sochi
- Number: 11

Youth career
- Spartak Moscow

Senior career*
Years	Team	Apps	(Gls)
2022–2025	Spartak Moscow	13	(1)
2024	→ Dinamo Minsk (loan)	10	(2)
2024–2025	→ Sochi (loan)	10	(7)
2025–	Sochi	12	(4)

International career^{‡}
2023	Russia U19	1	(1)
2023	Russia U21	1	(1)
- * Club domestic league appearances and goals as of 17 May 2026 ‡ National team caps and goals as of 15 June 2023

Pavel Alekseyevich Melyoshin (Russian: Павел Алексеевич Мелёшин; born 25 March 2004) is a Russian footballer who plays as a forward for Sochi.

== Career ==
Melyoshin made his debut for the senior team of Spartak Moscow on 30 August 2022 in a Russian Cup game against Krylia Sovetov Samara and scored the only goal of the game in a 1–0 Spartak victory. He made his Russian Premier League debut for Spartak on 11 September 2022 against FC Rostov. In his next start, Spartak's next Russian Cup game against Fakel Voronezh on 15 September 2022, Melyoshin scored once again.

On 8 February 2024, Melyoshin moved on loan to Dinamo Minsk in Belarus until the end of 2024. He returned from loan early in the summer of 2024.

On 12 September 2024, Melyoshin was loaned by Sochi. On 20 February 2025, Sochi exercised their option to buy and signed a three-and-a-half-year contract with Melyoshin.

== Personal life ==
His father Aleksei Melyoshin won the Russian Premier League four times with Spartak Moscow.

== Career statistics ==
As of match played 17 May 2026

Appearances and goals by club, season and competition
Club	Season	League			Cup		Other		Total	
Club	Season	Division	Apps	Goals	Apps	Goals	Apps	Goals	Apps	Goals
Spartak Moscow	2022–23	Russian Premier League	8	1	9	2	—		17	3
Spartak Moscow	2023–24	Russian Premier League	3	0	5	1	—		8	1
Spartak Moscow	2024–25	Russian Premier League	2	0	3	0	—		5	0
Spartak Moscow	Total		13	1	17	3	—		30	4
Dinamo Minsk (loan)	2024	Belarusian Premier League	10	2	4	0	1 (Note: Appearance in Belarusian Super Cup)	0	15	2
Sochi (loan)	2024–25	Russian First League	10	7	3	2	—		13	9
Sochi	2024–25	Russian First League	8	4	0	0	0	0	8	4
Sochi	2025–26	Russian Premier League	4	0	0	0	—		4	0
Sochi	Total		12	4	0	0	—		12	4
Career total			45	14	24	5	1	0	70	19
