= Zaozerne =

Zaozerne Заозерне
- Urban-type settlement
- Flag Coat of arms

- Location of Zaozerne in Crimea
- Coordinates: 45°09′38″N 33°17′06″E
- Country: Disputed; Russia, Ukraine
- Republic: Crimea
- Municipality: Yevpatoria
- Town status: 1973

Government
  - Town Head: Stanislav Navrotskyi

Area
  - Total: 8.56 km^{2} (3.31 sq mi)
- Elevation: 5 m (16 ft)

Population (2015)
  - Total: 4,332 ▲
  - Density: 506/km^{2} (1,310/sq mi)
- Time zone: UTC+4 (MSK)
- Postal code: 97493
- Area code: +380 6569
- Website: http://rada.gov.ua/

Zaozerne (Ukrainian: Заозерне; Russian: Заозёрное, romanized: Zaozyornoye; Crimean Tatar: Yalı Moynaq) is an urban-type settlement in the Yevpatoria municipality of the Autonomous Republic of Crimea, a territory recognized by a majority of countries as part of Ukraine and incorporated by Russia as the Republic of Crimea. Population: 4,332 (2014 Census); 4,161 as of the 2001 Ukrainian Census, and 4,940 in 2011.

Until 1948, the settlement was known by its native Crimean tatar name Yaly-Moinak (Ukrainian: Яли-Мойнак; Crimean Tatar: Yalı Moynaq). Its current name is literally translated as "beyond the lake." It was granted the status of an urban-type settlement in 1973.
