= Vitali Shitov =

Russian footballer

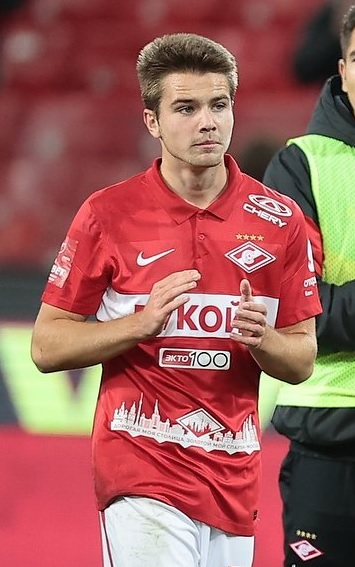
- Shitov with Spartak Moscow in 2022

Personal information
- Full name: Vitali Alekseyevich Shitov
- Date of birth: 7 May 2003 (age 23)
- Place of birth: Yaroslavl, Russia
- Height: 1.76 m (5 ft 9 1/2 in)
- Position: Midfielder

Team information
- Current team: Tyumen
- Number: 17

Youth career
- 2009–2015: Shinnik Yaroslavl
- 2015–2020: Spartak Moscow

Senior career*
Years	Team	Apps	(Gls)
2020–2025	Spartak Moscow	1	(0)
2020–2022	→ Spartak-2 Moscow	46	(2)
2023	→ Zvezda St. Petersburg (loan)	12	(0)
2023–2024	→ Tyumen (loan)	32	(5)
2024	→ Torpedo Moscow (loan)	5	(1)
2025	→ Tyumen (loan)	8	(1)
2025–	Tyumen	41	(7)

International career^{‡}
2018–2019	Russia U-16	9	(2)
2019–2020	Russia U-17	6	(1)
2021	Russia U-18	4	(1)
2021	Russia U-19	7	(1)
- * Club domestic league appearances and goals as of 17 October 2026 ‡ National team caps and goals as of 16 November 2021

Vitali Alekseyevich Shitov (Russian: Виталий Алексеевич Шитов; born 7 May 2003) is a Russian football player who plays for Tyumen.

== Club career ==
He made his debut in the Russian Football National League for Spartak-2 Moscow on 9 October 2020 in a game against Chayka Peschanokopskoye and scored a goal on his debut. His twin brother Vladislav scored twice on his own professional debut for Spartak-2 a month and a half earlier.

He made his debut for the senior squad of Spartak Moscow on 15 September 2022 in a Russian Cup game against Fakel Voronezh. He made his Russian Premier League debut for Spartak on 23 October 2022 against Khimki.

On 17 February 2023, Shitov was loaned to Zvezda St. Petersburg until 11 June 2023.

On 26 June 2023, Shitov joined Tyumen on a season-long loan.

On 21 June 2024, Shitov was loaned by Torpedo Moscow. On 20 January 2025, he returned to Tyumen on a new loan.

On 16 July 2025, Shitov moved to Tyumen on a permanent basis.

== Personal life ==
His twin brother Vladislav Shitov is also professional footballer.

== Career statistics ==
As of 24 May 2025

Club	Season	League			Cup		Continental		Total	
Club	Season	Division	Apps	Goals	Apps	Goals	Apps	Goals	Apps	Goals
Spartak-2 Moscow	2020–21	Russian First League	14	1	–		–		14	1
Spartak-2 Moscow	2021–22	Russian First League	32	1	–		–		32	1
Spartak-2 Moscow	Total		46	2	0	0	0	0	46	2
Spartak Moscow	2022–23	Russian Premier League	1	0	1	0	–		2	0
Zvezda St. Petersburg (loan)	2022–23	Russian Second League	12	0	1	0	–		13	0
Tyumen (loan)	2023–24	Russian First League	32	5	0	0	–		32	5
Torpedo Moscow (loan)	2024–25	Russian First League	5	1	2	1	–		7	2
Tyumen (loan)	2024–25	Russian First League	8	1	0	0	–		8	1
Career total			104	9	4	1	0	0	108	10
