= Aleksandr Zobnin =

Russian footballer

Personal information
- Full name: Aleksandr Sergeyevich Zobnin
- Date of birth: 22 February 1989 (age 37)
- Place of birth: Kemerovo, Soviet Union
- Height: 1.86 m (6 ft 1 in)
- Position: Forward

Senior career*
Years	Team	Apps	(Gls)
2006	FC Krylia Sovetov-SOK Dimitrovgrad	0	(0)
2008	FC Zvezda Irkutsk	26	(0)
2009	FC Tom Tomsk	0	(0)
2010	FC Avangard Kursk	17	(1)
2011–2012	FC Radian-Baikal Irkutsk	21	(1)
- * Club domestic league appearances and goals

Aleksandr Sergeyevich Zobnin (Russian: Александр Серге́евич Зобнин; born 22 February 1989) is a retired Russian professional footballer. He is the older brother of Roman Zobnin.

After retirement he became a civil pilot for S7 Airlines.

== Club career ==
He made his professional debut in the Russian Football National League in 2008 for FC Zvezda Irkutsk.
