= FC Spartak-2 Moscow =

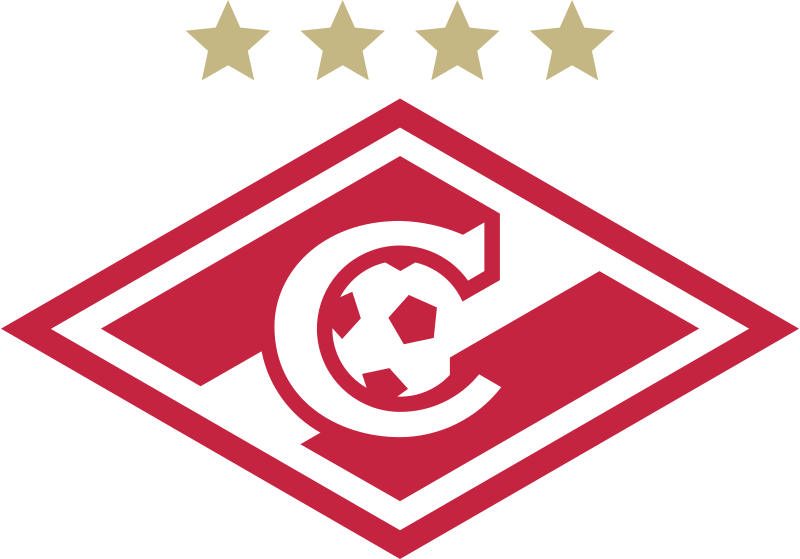
- Full name: Football Club Spartak-2 Moscow
- Founded: 2013
- Ground: Spartak Moscow Cherenkov Academy Stadium
- Capacity: 3,077
- Owner: Lukoil
- Chairman: Oleg Malyshev
- Manager: Pavel Figon
- League: Russian Second League, Division B, Group 2
- 2026: 10th
- Website: spartak.com
Home colours	Away colours

FC Spartak-2 Moscow (Russian: ФК «Спартак-2» Москва) is a Russian football team from Moscow, founded in 1964. It is the reserve club of Russian Premier League team FC Spartak Moscow.

== History ==
The club has participated in professional competition in the past, as FC Spartak-d Moscow (Russian Second League in 1992–1993, Russian Third Division in 1994–1997) and as FC Spartak-2 Moscow (Russian Second Division in 1998–2000). It started playing professionally again in 2013 in the third-tier Russian Professional Football League.

On 24 May 2015, they secured the top spot in the West Zone of the PFL and promotion for the first time in history to the second-tier Russian Football National League for the 2015–16 season.

On 23 May 2022, FC Spartak Moscow announced that Spartak-2 will be dissolved and not participate in the 2022–23 season for budgetary reasons.

On 25 December 2023, Spartak announced the revival of the team and their plans to enter the Russian Second League. They were assigned to Group 2 of Division B (fourth tier).

== Current squad ==
As of 11 September 2026, according to the Second League website.

Note: Flags indicate national team as defined under FIFA eligibility rules; some limited exceptions apply. Players may hold more than one non-FIFA nationality.

No.	Pos.	Nation	Player
24	MF	RUS	Nikita Massalyga
32	GK	RUS	Ruslan Pichiyenko
33	GK	RUS	Rinat Agishev
36	GK	RUS	Aleksey Polessky
38	MF	RUS	Vladimir Pavlov
40	MF	RUS	Ivan Sorokin
42	MF	RUS	Fyodor Vinokurenkov
45	DF	RUS	Ruslan Bystritsky
48	MF	RUS	Artyom Chudakov
50	GK	RUS	Bulat Tsaliyev
52	MF	RUS	Marat Shayakhmetov
53	DF	RUS	Georgy Khanin
54	GK	RUS	Maksim Nakleskin
57	DF	RUS	Nikolay Dergach
58	DF	RUS	Matvey Kuznetsov
59	MF	KGZ	Nursultan Alisherov
60	DF	RUS	Denis Bogomolov
61	DF	RUS	Timofey Rozhkov
62	FW	RUS	Pavel Polekh
63	FW	RUS	Stepan Klyukin
64	MF	RUS	Stepan Bogdanov
66	DF	RUS	Nikita Zakharov
67	DF	RUS	Nikita Romas

No.	Pos.	Nation	Player
69	FW	RUS	Ilya Ivarlak
70	MF	RUS	Makar Vysochenko
71	DF	RUS	Aleksandr Dobroditsky
73	FW	RUS	Vadim Tsygankov
74	DF	RUS	Yegor Maksimov
76	MF	RUS	Nikita Kochanov
77	MF	RUS	Anton Zinkovsky
78	MF	RUS	Pavel Pelevin
79	FW	RUS	Daniil Zhitnikov
80	DF	RUS	Maksim Serov
81	DF	RUS	Semyon Chukhleb
84	FW	RUS	Artyom Bykovsky
85	FW	RUS	Aleksandr Konkin
86	GK	RUS	Pavel Yegorov
87	MF	RUS	Danil Makushenko
89	FW	RUS	Viktor Solopov
90	FW	RUS	Daniil Danu
92	MF	RUS	Karim Bikbulatov
94	FW	RUS	Roman Frolov
95	MF	RUS	Gadzhimurad Abdullayev
96	FW	RUS	Zakhar Chushkin
99	MF	RUS	Artyom Rogov
