= List of Russian football transfers winter 2024–25 =

This is a list of Russian football transfers in the 2024–25 winter transfer window by club. Only clubs of the 2024–25 Russian Premier League are included.

== Russian Premier League 2024–25 ==
=== Akhmat Grozny ===
In: Note: Flags indicate national team as defined under FIFA eligibility rules; some limited exceptions apply. Players may hold more than one non-FIFA nationality.

No.	Pos.	Nation	Player
1	GK	RUS	Vadim Ulyanov (from (Kazakhstan) Kairat)
3	DF	RUS	Leo Goglichidze (from Ural Yekaterinburg)
9	FW	PAR	Rodrigo Ruiz Díaz (from (Paraguay) 2 de Mayo)
28	MF	RUS	Daniil Zorin (on loan from Spartak Moscow)
32	DF	RUS	Ilyas Gaibov (from own academy)
61	FW	RUS	Bulat Vatsuyev (from own academy)
74	MF	RUS	Daniil Turishchev (from own academy)
77	FW	RUS	Georgi Melkadze (from (Georgia (country)) Kolkheti-1913 Poti)

Out: Note: Flags indicate national team as defined under FIFA eligibility rules; some limited exceptions apply. Players may hold more than one non-FIFA nationality.

No.	Pos.	Nation	Player
1	GK	RUS	Mikhail Oparin (to Shinnik Yaroslavl)
15	MF	BRA	Camilo (to (Brazil) Grêmio)
30	FW	BRA	Felippe Cardoso (on loan to (China) Henan)
36	DF	BRA	Lucas Lovat (on loan to (Brazil) Goiás)
98	FW	BUL	Svetoslav Kovachev (on loan to (Bulgaria) Arda Kardzhali)
—	GK	RUS	Rizvan Tashayev (on loan to Amkar Perm, previously on loan to Sokol Kazan)
—	DF	RUS	Vladislav Volkov (to Mashuk-KMV, previously on loan to Volgar Astrakhan)

=== Akron Tolyatti ===
In: Note: Flags indicate national team as defined under FIFA eligibility rules; some limited exceptions apply. Players may hold more than one non-FIFA nationality.

No.	Pos.	Nation	Player
16	GK	RUS	Matvey Bezrogov (from own academy)
22	DF	ROU	Ionuț Nedelcearu (from (Italy) Palermo)
32	GK	RUS	Ignat Terekhovsky (from Krasnodar)
35	MF	BIH	Ifet Đakovac (from (Serbia) TSC)
54	DF	RUS	Aleksey Solovyov (from Akron-2 Tolyatti)
95	GK	RUS	Artyom Grigoryev (from Akron-2 Tolyatti)

Out: Note: Flags indicate national team as defined under FIFA eligibility rules; some limited exceptions apply. Players may hold more than one non-FIFA nationality.

No.	Pos.	Nation	Player
10	MF	RUS	Maksim Paliyenko (to (Armenia) Urartu)
13	FW	CGO	Mavis Tchibota (on loan to (Israel) Bnei Sakhnin)
22	DF	BLR	Nikita Baranok (on loan to (Belarus) Maxline Vitebsk)
23	DF	MKD	Bojan Dimoski (on loan to (Serbia) Partizan)
28	MF	RUS	Aksenty Chaligava (to Akron-2 Tolyatti)
48	DF	RUS	Nikita Shershov (to Akron-2 Tolyatti)
50	GK	RUS	Dmitry Nagayev (to KDV Tomsk)
82	DF	RUS	Aleksandr Alyokhin (to Rodina Moscow)
99	FW	RUS	Ivan Timoshenko (end of loan from Rodina Moscow)

=== CSKA Moscow ===
In: Note: Flags indicate national team as defined under FIFA eligibility rules; some limited exceptions apply. Players may hold more than one non-FIFA nationality.

No.	Pos.	Nation	Player
5	MF	ARG	Rodrigo Villagra (from (Argentina) River Plate)
7	FW	BRA	Alerrandro (from (Brazil) Red Bull Bragantino)
47	MF	RUS	Ivan Ananyev (from Zenit-2 St. Petersburg)
79	DF	RUS	Kirill Danilov (from own academy)
82	MF	RUS	Aleksey Bondarenko (from own academy)
87	MF	RUS	Artyom Ponomarchuk (from Spartak Moscow)
88	FW	RUS	Artyom Serikov (from own academy)

Out: Note: Flags indicate national team as defined under FIFA eligibility rules; some limited exceptions apply. Players may hold more than one non-FIFA nationality.

No.	Pos.	Nation	Player
5	MF	SRB	Saša Zdjelar (to Zenit St. Petersburg)
23	GK	RUS	Ilya Pomazun (to Spartak Moscow)
46	FW	RUS	Vladislav Yakovlev (on loan to (Armenia) Urartu)
54	DF	RUS	Aleksandr Dyomin (on loan to Spartak Tambov)
55	FW	RUS	Rostislav Polyakov (to Mashuk-KMV)
56	FW	RUS	Maksim Sidelnikov (on loan to Veles Moscow)
59	MF	RUS	Danila Prokopyev (to Sochi-2)
63	MF	RUS	Kirill Dudarin (on loan to Rotor Volgograd)
77	DF	RUS	Ilya Agapov (on loan to Pari Nizhny Novgorod)
81	FW	RUS	Daniil Reznichenko
87	DF	RUS	Sergey Vasilyev (to Saturn Ramenskoye)
89	MF	RUS	Vadim Churilov (to Torpedo Moscow)
—	DF	BRA	Bruno Fuchs (to (Brazil) Atlético Mineiro, previously on loan)
—	DF	IRI	Amirhossein Reyvandi (on loan to (Croatia) Jarun Zagreb, previously on loan to (Uzbekistan) Bukhara)
—	MF	ALG	Sid Ahmed Aissaoui (on loan to (Algeria) MC Alger, previously on loan to (Moldova) Sheriff Tiraspol)
—	MF	RUS	Renat Golybin (to KAMAZ Naberezhnye Chelny, previously on loan to Neftekhimik Nizhnekamsk)
—	MF	CHI	Víctor Méndez (to (Chile) Colo-Colo, previously on loan to Krylia Sovetov Samara)

=== Dynamo Makhachkala ===
In: Note: Flags indicate national team as defined under FIFA eligibility rules; some limited exceptions apply. Players may hold more than one non-FIFA nationality.

No.	Pos.	Nation	Player
14	DF	RUS	Abakar Akayev (from Dynamo-2 Makhachkala)
21	MF	RUS	Abdulpasha Dzhabrailov (end of loan to Mashuk-KMV)
22	DF	ALG	Mohamed Azzi (from (Algeria) CR Belouizdad)
36	GK	RUS	Zaynudin Zaynudinov (from Dynamo-2 Makhachkala)
43	DF	RUS	Ilyas Akhmedov (from Dynamo-2 Makhachkala)
96	FW	RUS	Kirill Pomeshkin (from Kosmos Dolgoprudny)
98	FW	RUS	Gadzhi Budunov (from Dynamo-2 Makhachkala)

Out: Note: Flags indicate national team as defined under FIFA eligibility rules; some limited exceptions apply. Players may hold more than one non-FIFA nationality.

No.	Pos.	Nation	Player
1	GK	RUS	Nikita Goylo (end of loan from Zenit St. Petersburg)
17	MF	RUS	Anton Krachkovsky (on loan to (Azerbaijan) Turan Tovuz)
20	FW	RUS	Alimkhan Zaynivov (to Dynamo-2 Makhachkala)
22	MF	RUS	Zalimkhan Yusupov (to Chernomorets Novorossiysk)
55	DF	SRB	Vladimir Kovačević (to Sokol Saratov)
82	DF	RUS	Nikita Kotin (end of loan from Rostov)
—	DF	COL	Francisco Campo (to (Belarus) Minsk, previously on loan to (Kazakhstan) Shakhter Karagandy)

=== Dynamo Moscow ===
In: Note: Flags indicate national team as defined under FIFA eligibility rules; some limited exceptions apply. Players may hold more than one non-FIFA nationality.

No.	Pos.	Nation	Player
4	DF	PAR	Juan José Cáceres (from (Argentina) Lanús)
15	MF	RUS	Danil Glebov (from Rostov)
29	DF	RUS	Andrey Rogachyov (from own academy)
33	MF	RUS	Gleb Knyazev (from own academy)
39	MF	RUS	Aleksandr Yefimov (from own academy)
43	MF	RUS	Pavel Gulin (from own academy)
45	MF	RUS	Leonid Kononov (from own academy)
48	DF	RUS	Daniil Zavarzin (from own academy)
49	DF	RUS	Aleksandr Lubnin (from own academy)
53	MF	RUS	Vladislav Kudryavtsev (from own academy)
57	MF	RUS	Daniil Promoshkin (from Amkar Perm)
59	MF	RUS	Vladislav Stepanov (from own academy)
60	MF	RUS	Timofey Marinkin (from own academy)
62	DF	RUS	Konstantin Tron (from own academy)
63	FW	RUS	Gadzhimagomed Khalilulayev (from own academy)
64	FW	RUS	Vitaly Petrov (from own academy)
65	DF	RUS	Vladimir Ivanov (from own academy)
66	MF	RUS	Andrey Dyomushkin (from own academy)
67	DF	RUS	Daniil Cherkasov (from own academy)
68	DF	RUS	Georgy Tikhomirov (from own academy)
71	MF	RUS	Artyom Zmeyev (from own academy)
75	MF	RUS	Maksim Mayorov (from own academy)
78	DF	RUS	Danil Avramenko (from own academy)
81	DF	RUS	Nikita Shchepetkin (from (Malta) Birkirkara)
82	MF	RUS	Savva Potapov (from own academy)
83	DF	RUS	Timur Korchagin (from own academy)
84	MF	RUS	Daniil Tushich (from Zenit St. Petersburg academy)
85	GK	RUS	Aleksandr Temirov (from own academy)
94	FW	RUS	Roman Bosov (from own academy)
95	FW	RUS	Ivan Sirotkin (from own academy)
96	MF	RUS	Albert Ratnikov (from Zenit St. Petersburg academy)
97	DF	RUS	Nikita Morozov (from own academy)
99	FW	RUS	Maksim Yurin (from own academy)

Out: Note: Flags indicate national team as defined under FIFA eligibility rules; some limited exceptions apply. Players may hold more than one non-FIFA nationality.

No.	Pos.	Nation	Player
20	FW	RUS	Vyacheslav Grulyov (to Pari Nizhny Novgorod)
28	DF	RUS	Kirill Isayev (on loan to Torpedo Moscow)
34	MF	GEO	Luka Gagnidze (on loan to Krylia Sovetov Samara)
59	DF	RUS	Ivan Lepsky (on loan to Sokol Saratov)
80	DF	RUS	Stanislav Bessmertny (on loan to Ural Yekaterinburg)
—	MF	RUS	Ivan Zazvonkin (on loan to Yenisey Krasnoyarsk, previously on loan to Baltika Kaliningrad)

=== Fakel Voronezh ===
In: Note: Flags indicate national team as defined under FIFA eligibility rules; some limited exceptions apply. Players may hold more than one non-FIFA nationality.

No.	Pos.	Nation	Player
5	DF	RUS	Albert Gabarayev (from (Kazakhstan) Tobol)
19	FW	ALB	Belajdi Pusi (from (Azerbaijan) Shamakhi)
26	MF	RUS	Ruslan Plaksin (from own academy)
52	FW	RUS	Aleksandr Belyayev (from own academy)
66	FW	RUS	Nikita Patkovich (from own academy)
71	MF	BLR	Anton Kavalyow (from (Belarus) Torpedo-BelAZ Zhodino)
77	FW	RUS	Aleksandr Lomovitsky (on loan from Rubin Kazan)
79	GK	RUS	Artyom Shestopalov (from own academy)
95	DF	RUS	Artyom Goryainov (from own academy)

Out: Note: Flags indicate national team as defined under FIFA eligibility rules; some limited exceptions apply. Players may hold more than one non-FIFA nationality.

No.	Pos.	Nation	Player
5	MF	RSA	Thabo Cele (to (South Africa) Kaizer Chiefs)
8	MF	RUS	Abdula Bagamayev (on loan to Dynamo Vladivostok)
20	FW	RUS	Yevgeni Markov (to Ural Yekaterinburg)
35	GK	RUS	Vyacheslav Dorovskikh (on loan to Kaluga)
77	FW	RUS	Luka Bagateliya (on loan to Volga Ulyanovsk)
88	DF	RUS	Vladislav Masternoy (to Chernomorets Novorossiysk)
98	FW	RUS	Ilya Vasin (on loan to Kuban Krasnodar)

=== Khimki ===
In: Note: Flags indicate national team as defined under FIFA eligibility rules; some limited exceptions apply. Players may hold more than one non-FIFA nationality.

No.	Pos.	Nation	Player
29	MF	CIV	Boni Amian (end of loan to (Belarus) Dinamo Minsk)
35	GK	RUS	Martin Khomich (from Khimki-M)
41	MF	RUS	David Bekoyev (from Khimki-M)
56	MF	RUS	Zaurbek Ramonov (from Khimki-M)
71	DF	RUS	Vladimir Shishnin (from Khimki-M)
78	MF	RUS	Magomet Tsoloyev (from Khimki-M)
83	FW	RUS	Fyodor Subbotin (from Khimki-M)
86	DF	RUS	Kirill Skvortsov (from own academy)
94	FW	RUS	Maksim Chufyrov (from Khimki-M)
98	FW	RUS	Oleg Trofimov (from Khimki-M)

Out: Note: Flags indicate national team as defined under FIFA eligibility rules; some limited exceptions apply. Players may hold more than one non-FIFA nationality.

No.	Pos.	Nation	Player
8	FW	RUS	Kirill Panchenko (retired)
10	MF	NGR	Saminu Abdullahi (to (Mexico) Juárez)
13	DF	RUS	Sergey Terekhov (to Sochi)
21	FW	UZB	Alisher Odilov (to (Uzbekistan) Navbahor)
26	DF	SRB	Nemanja Anđelković (to (Kazakhstan) Aktobe)
27	DF	CIV	Cédric Gogoua (to Shinnik Yaroslavl)
44	GK	RUS	Yaroslav Burychenkov
70	MF	RUS	Ruslan Ozdoyev (to Baltika-2)
80	MF	RUS	Khetag Khosonov (to Torpedo Moscow)
88	MF	RUS	Denis Glushakov
—	DF	BLR	Zakhar Volkov (to (Belarus) Maxline Vitebsk, previously on loan to Arsenal Tula)
—	MF	KAZ	Lev Skvortsov (to (Kazakhstan) Aktobe, previously on loan to Shinnik Yaroslavl)
—	FW	RUS	Ilya Porokhov (on loan to Sokol Saratov, previously on loan to Ural Yekaterinburg)

=== Krasnodar ===
In: Note: Flags indicate national team as defined under FIFA eligibility rules; some limited exceptions apply. Players may hold more than one non-FIFA nationality.

No.	Pos.	Nation	Player
26	FW	RUS	Arkhip Kazantsev (from own academy)
27	MF	RUS	Yefim Burkin (from own academy)
28	DF	RUS	Marat Kulayev (from own academy)
29	FW	RUS	Eldar Guseynov (from own academy)
50	DF	RUS	Nikita Zakarlyuka (from own academy)
60	MF	RUS	Andrey Polevoy (from own academy)
70	FW	RUS	Artyom Dryakhlov (from own academy)
75	FW	RUS	Oleg Semizarov (from own academy)

Out: Note: Flags indicate national team as defined under FIFA eligibility rules; some limited exceptions apply. Players may hold more than one non-FIFA nationality.

No.	Pos.	Nation	Player
5	MF	COL	Kevin Castaño (to (Argentina) River Plate)
22	DF	RUS	Stanislav Puzanov (on loan to Volgar Astrakhan)
26	MF	RUS	Dmitri Kratkov (to (Uzbekistan) Surkhon)
27	MF	RUS	Mikhail Umnikov (on loan to Volga Ulyanovsk)
29	DF	RUS	Vitali Shakhov
30	GK	RUS	Valentin Grishin (on loan to Astrakhan)
33	DF	ARM	Georgy Arutyunyan (to (Hungary) Puskás Akadémia)
35	GK	RUS	Roman Safronov (on loan to Forte Taganrog)
36	DF	RUS	Danila Gayvoronsky (on loan to Forte Taganrog)
39	GK	RUS	Ignat Terekhovsky (to Akron Tolyatti)
41	FW	RUS	Timur Abdrashitov (on loan to Uralets-TS Nizhny Tagil)
47	MF	RUS	Stanislav Oleynik (to Orenburg-2)
48	DF	RUS	Bogdan Surikov
50	MF	RUS	Grigory Lovtsov (on loan to Dynamo Kirov)
51	FW	RUS	Klim Zvonaryov (to Tver)
52	DF	RUS	Vitaly Khabarov (to Dynamo St. Petersburg)
54	DF	RUS	Kirill Kistenyov (on loan to Znamya Truda)
55	FW	RUS	Andrey Domotsev (to Mashuk-KMV)
57	FW	RUS	Ivan Kovrechenkov (to Ural Yekaterinburg)
60	MF	RUS	Denis Bogomolov (to Mashuk-KMV)
62	FW	RUS	Yevgeny Kovalevsky (on loan to Spartak Kostroma)
68	FW	RUS	Artur Avagumyan (to Pobeda Khasavyurt)
70	DF	RUS	Kirill Peredery (to Baltika-2 Kaliningrad)
75	MF	ARM	Eduard Bagrintsev (to Kuban Krasnodar)
77	MF	RUS	Nikita Getman (to Irtysh Omsk)
80	DF	RUS	Aleksandr Mosin (to Arsenal-2 Tula)
86	MF	RUS	Artyom Zhelannikov (to Orenburg-2)
87	MF	RUS	Islam-Bek Gubzhokov (to Dynamo Vologda)
92	FW	RUS	Arseny Popushoy (to Baltika-BFU Kaliningrad)
93	FW	RUS	Sergey Dedyayev (to Znamya Truda)
94	MF	RUS	Dmitry Kuchugura (on loan to Ural Yekaterinburg)
96	FW	RUS	Aleksandr Koksharov (on loan to Pari Nizhny Novgorod)
—	DF	RUS	Mikhail Sukhoruchenko (on loan to Amkar Perm, previously on loan to Tyumen)
—	DF	RUS	Grigory Zhilkin (on loan to Chernomorets Novorossiysk, previously on loan to Arsenal Tula)
—	MF	RUS	Ruslan Chobanov (on loan to Veles Moscow, previously on loan to Sokol Saratov)
—	MF	NGR	Ifeanyi David Nduka (on loan to Sokol Saratov, previously on loan to Arsenal Tula)
—	MF	RUS	Aleksandr Yegurnev (to Murom, previously on loan to Spartak Kostroma)

=== Krylia Sovetov Samara ===
In: Note: Flags indicate national team as defined under FIFA eligibility rules; some limited exceptions apply. Players may hold more than one non-FIFA nationality.

No.	Pos.	Nation	Player
9	FW	RUS	Anton Zinkovsky (on loan from Spartak Moscow)
34	MF	GEO	Luka Gagnidze (on loan from Dynamo Moscow)
83	MF	RUS	Dmitry Cherkasov (from own academy)
89	DF	RUS	Artur Zagorodnikov (from Krylia Sovetov-2 Samara)
91	FW	RUS	Vladimir Ignatenko (from Krylia Sovetov-2 Samara)

Out: Note: Flags indicate national team as defined under FIFA eligibility rules; some limited exceptions apply. Players may hold more than one non-FIFA nationality.

No.	Pos.	Nation	Player
10	MF	ARG	Benjamín Garré (to (Brazil) Vasco da Gama)
23	MF	CHI	Víctor Méndez (end of loan from CSKA Moscow)
32	FW	ARG	Franco Orozco (end of loan from (Argentina) Lanús)
63	DF	RUS	Aleksey Mutovkin (to Arsenal-2 Tula)
—	MF	RUS	Artyom Sokolov (on loan to Chelyabinsk, previously on loan to Torpedo Moscow)

=== Lokomotiv Moscow ===
In: Note: Flags indicate national team as defined under FIFA eligibility rules; some limited exceptions apply. Players may hold more than one non-FIFA nationality.

No.	Pos.	Nation	Player
56	GK	RUS	Bogdan Sheyko (from own academy)
66	DF	BLR	Arseniy Ageyev (end of loan to (Belarus) Arsenal Dzerzhinsk)
80	DF	RUS	Kirill Volkov (end of loan to (Belarus) Arsenal Dzerzhinsk)
90	MF	RUS	Danila Godyayev (end of loan to (Belarus) Arsenal Dzerzhinsk)

Out: Note: Flags indicate national team as defined under FIFA eligibility rules; some limited exceptions apply. Players may hold more than one non-FIFA nationality.

No.	Pos.	Nation	Player
58	DF	RUS	Denis Uralyov
67	MF	RUS	Vladislav Mamonov
—	DF	RUS	Ivan Kuzmichyov (on loan to Rodina Moscow, previously on loan to Torpedo Moscow)
—	DF	ALB	Mario Mitaj (to (Saudi Arabia) Al-Ittihad, previously on loan)
—	MF	ARM	Vadim Harutyunyan (on loan to (Belarus) Arsenal Dzerzhinsk, previously from the same club)
—	FW	RUS	Anton Kamyshenko (to Rodina-2 Moscow, previously on loan to Sochi)
—	FW	RUS	Roman Kolmakov (to Zenit-2 St. Petersburg, previously on loan)
—	FW	BLR	Ruslan Myalkovskiy (on loan to (Belarus) Arsenal Dzerzhinsk, previously from the same club)
—	FW	RUS	Andrey Nikitin (on loan to Neftekhimik Nizhnekamsk, previously on loan to Arsenal Tula)
—	FW	BRA	Pedrinho (on loan to (Brazil) Cuiabá, previously on loan to (Brazil) Santos)
—	FW	RUS	Denis Pushkaryov (to Chelyabinsk, previously on loan)

=== Orenburg ===
In: Note: Flags indicate national team as defined under FIFA eligibility rules; some limited exceptions apply. Players may hold more than one non-FIFA nationality.

No.	Pos.	Nation	Player
5	DF	RUS	Aleksei Tatayev (from Alania Vladikavkaz)
33	GK	RUS	Vladimir Manakov (from own academy)
37	FW	RUS	Viktor Saranchukov (from Orenburg-2)
50	GK	RUS	Yegor Skichko (from own academy)
63	MF	RUS	Omar Minatulayev (from own academy)
64	FW	RUS	Osman Minatulayev (from own academy)
65	MF	RUS	Ivan Ivashchenko (from own academy)
70	FW	RUS	Danil Kapustyansky (end of loan to Amkar Perm)
76	DF	RUS	Pavel Klinov (from own academy)
77	FW	RUS	Atsamaz Revazov (from Kuban-Holding Pavlovskaya)
82	FW	RUS	Ilya Vsyakikh (from own academy)
85	GK	RUS	Nikolay Tyulenev (from own academy)
88	DF	RUS	Nikolay Koserik (from own academy)
90	FW	RUS	Maksim Savelyev (from Yenisey Krasnoyarsk)
97	MF	RUS	Ilya Yerokhin (from Orenburg-2)

Out: Note: Flags indicate national team as defined under FIFA eligibility rules; some limited exceptions apply. Players may hold more than one non-FIFA nationality.

No.	Pos.	Nation	Player
6	DF	IRI	Mohammad Ghorbani (to (United Arab Emirates) Al Wahda)
13	GK	RUS	Aleksei Kenyaykin (to Volga Ulyanovsk)
22	DF	ARG	Matías Pérez (to (Paraguay) Cerro Porteño)
69	MF	RUS	Semyon Yurin
—	MF	RUS	Batraz Gurtsiyev (on loan to Sokol Saratov, previously on loan to Alania Vladikavkaz)

=== Pari Nizhny Novgorod ===
In: Note: Flags indicate national team as defined under FIFA eligibility rules; some limited exceptions apply. Players may hold more than one non-FIFA nationality.

No.	Pos.	Nation	Player
9	FW	URU	Thiago Vecino (on loan from (Argentina) Vélez Sarsfield)
16	DF	RUS	Yaroslav Krashevsky (from Khimik Dzerzhinsk)
23	DF	COL	Juan Castillo (from (Colombia) Fortaleza CEIF)
27	FW	RUS	Vyacheslav Grulyov (from Dynamo Moscow)
35	GK	RUS	Konstantin Melentyev (from own academy)
51	GK	RUS	Yegor Koshkin (from Spartak Moscow)
57	MF	RUS	Roman Chibanov (from Pari NN-2)
67	DF	RUS	Yegor Skvortsov (from Pari NN-2)
86	DF	RUS	Ilya Agapov (on loan from CSKA Moscow)
96	FW	RUS	Aleksandr Koksharov (on loan from Krasnodar)

Out: Note: Flags indicate national team as defined under FIFA eligibility rules; some limited exceptions apply. Players may hold more than one non-FIFA nationality.

No.	Pos.	Nation	Player
2	DF	RUS	Danila Vedernikov (to Astrakhan)
4	MF	RUS	Ilya Zhigulyov (to KAMAZ Naberezhnye Chelny)
6	DF	RUS	Dmitry Tikhy (to (Armenia) Urartu)
9	FW	GBS	Zé Turbo (on loan to (Cyprus) AEL Limassol)
11	DF	BUL	Mateo Stamatov
18	MF	ISR	Dan Glazer (to (Kazakhstan) Kairat)
21	MF	RUS	Dmitry Kalayda (on loan to Amkar Perm)
23	FW	GEO	Nikoloz Kutateladze (on loan to (Georgia (country)) Dinamo Tbilisi)
27	DF	RUS	Dmitri Zhivoglyadov
34	MF	RUS	Anton Mukhin (on loan to Dynamo Vladivostok)
47	DF	RUS	Artyom Varganov (to (Bulgaria) Slavia Sofia)
61	DF	RUS	Yevgeny Lukinykh (on loan to Zenit-2 St. Petersburg)
81	GK	RUS	Ivan Kukushkin (on loan to Baltika Kaliningrad)
87	MF	RUS	Kirill Bozhenov (on loan to Chelyabinsk)
88	MF	RUS	Kirill Glushchenkov (on loan to (Belarus) Torpedo-BelAZ Zhodino)
90	FW	SRB	Ognjen Ožegović (on loan to (Turkey) Sakaryaspor)
—	DF	UZB	Ibrokhimkhalil Yuldoshev (to (Uzbekistan) Neftchi Fergana, previously on loan to (Kazakhstan) Kairat)
—	MF	RUS	David Kobesov (to Alania Vladikavkaz)
—	MF	RUS	Ivan Sutugin (on loan to Rotor Volgograd, previously on loan to Khimik Dzerzhinsk)

=== Rostov ===
In: Note: Flags indicate national team as defined under FIFA eligibility rules; some limited exceptions apply. Players may hold more than one non-FIFA nationality.

No.	Pos.	Nation	Player
5	DF	RUS	Nikolai Poyarkov (end of loan to SKA-Khabarovsk)
39	DF	RUS	Maksim Radchenko (from Rostov-2)
41	DF	RUS	Artur Maksetsov (from Rostov-2)
42	DF	RUS	Kirill Shubin (from own academy)
43	MF	RUS	Andrey Bondar (from own academy)
54	MF	RUS	Andrey Amosov (from own academy)
59	DF	RUS	Nikita Babakin (from own academy)
61	FW	RUS	Kirill Cheburakov (from Rostov-2)
63	MF	RUS	Dmitry Shevchenko (from own academy)
68	DF	RUS	Sarkis Tveritnev (from own academy)
72	FW	RUS	Vadim Rassadin (from own academy)
76	MF	RUS	Murad Alimov (from Rostov-2)
81	DF	RUS	Yevgeny Tonevitsky (from Rostov-2)
83	FW	RUS	Ivan Petrov (from own academy)
88	FW	TKM	Denis Titov (from own academy)
94	MF	RUS	Marat Kovalkov (from Rostov-2)

Out: Note: Flags indicate national team as defined under FIFA eligibility rules; some limited exceptions apply. Players may hold more than one non-FIFA nationality.

No.	Pos.	Nation	Player
15	MF	RUS	Danil Glebov (to Dynamo Moscow)
23	FW	RUS	Roman Tugarev (to (Kazakhstan) Elimai)
28	DF	RUS	Yevgeni Chernov (on loan to Baltika Kaliningrad)
75	FW	RUS	Danil Khromov (to Rostov-2)
77	MF	RUS	Stepan Melnikov
78	GK	RUS	Mikhail Tsulaya (to Arsenal Tula)
—	GK	RUS	Aleksandr Dyachkov (to Rostov-2, previously on loan to Chernomorets Novorossiysk)
—	GK	RUS	Aleksandr Grigoryev (on loan to Tekstilshchik Ivanovo, previously on loan to Leningradets Leningrad Oblast)
—	DF	RUS	Nikita Kotin (on loan to Shinnik Yaroslavl, previously on loan to Dynamo Makhachkala)

=== Rubin Kazan ===
In: Note: Flags indicate national team as defined under FIFA eligibility rules; some limited exceptions apply. Players may hold more than one non-FIFA nationality.

No.	Pos.	Nation	Player
80	DF	RUS	Ramil Kalmurzin (from own academy)

Out: Note: Flags indicate national team as defined under FIFA eligibility rules; some limited exceptions apply. Players may hold more than one non-FIFA nationality.

No.	Pos.	Nation	Player
9	FW	RUS	Aleksandr Lomovitsky (on loan to Fakel Voronezh)
20	FW	GHA	Joel Fameyeh (to (Hungary) Puskás Akadémia)
33	MF	UZB	Umarali Rakhmonaliev (on loan to (Azerbaijan) Sabah)
77	FW	RUS	Daniil Kuznetsov (on loan to Ural Yekaterinburg)
97	FW	RUS	Daniil Motorin (on loan to KAMAZ Naberezhnye Chelny)
—	GK	RUS	Artyom Ismagilov (to Kaluga, previously on loan to Amkar Perm)

=== Spartak Moscow ===
In: Note: Flags indicate national team as defined under FIFA eligibility rules; some limited exceptions apply. Players may hold more than one non-FIFA nationality.

No.	Pos.	Nation	Player
1	GK	RUS	Ilya Pomazun (from CSKA Moscow)
7	FW	ARG	Pablo Solari (from (Argentina) River Plate)
11	FW	TTO	Levi García (from (Greece) AEK Athens)
32	GK	RUS	Ruslan Pichiyenko (from own academy)
34	FW	RUS	Georgy Rykov (from own academy)
41	DF	RUS	Dmitry Kuroshev (from Spartak-2 Moscow)
43	MF	RUS	Ruslan Voytsekhovsky (from Spartak-2 Moscow)
59	DF	RUS	Artyom Krutovskikh (from own academy)
66	DF	RUS	Yury Petin (from Spartak-2 Moscow)
67	MF	RUS	Ivan Ivanov (from Spartak-2 Moscow)
71	DF	RUS	Aleksandr Dobroditsky (from own academy)
74	MF	RUS	Zakhar Dyatlov (from Rostov academy)
80	MF	RUS	Gleb Popolitov (from Stroitel Kamensk-Shakhtinsky)

Out: Note: Flags indicate national team as defined under FIFA eligibility rules; some limited exceptions apply. Players may hold more than one non-FIFA nationality.

No.	Pos.	Nation	Player
11	FW	JAM	Shamar Nicholson (to (Mexico) Tijuana)
12	FW	BRA	Willian José (to (Brazil) Bahia)
17	FW	RUS	Anton Zinkovsky (on loan to Krylia Sovetov Samara)
28	MF	RUS	Daniil Zorin (on loan to Akhmat Grozny)
37	MF	RUS	Ivan Starkov (to Saturn Ramenskoye)
48	DF	RUS	Aleksandr Danilov (to Volga Ulyanovsk)
52	GK	RUS	Yegor Koshkin (to Pari Nizhny Novgorod)
57	GK	RUS	Aleksandr Selikhov (to Ural Yekaterinburg)
60	MF	RUS	Abdullo Dzhebov (to Saturn Ramenskoye)
74	DF	RUS	Yegor Guziyev (to Saturn Ramenskoye)
78	MF	RUS	Artyom Ponomarchuk (to CSKA Moscow)
84	MF	RUS	Daniil Plotnikov (to Khimik Dzerzhinsk)
86	GK	RUS	Ilya Tikhomirov (to Spartak-2 Moscow)
93	FW	RUS	Artyom Bykovsky (on loan to (Moldova) Petrocub Hîncești)
91	FW	RUS	Aleksandr Pomalyuk (on loan to Chertanovo Moscow)
96	FW	RUS	Yegor Sysoyev (to Torpedo Moscow)
—	DF	RUS	Yuri Koledin (to Saturn Ramenskoye, previously on loan to Torpedo Moscow)
—	DF	POR	Tomás Tavares (to (Portugal) AVS, previously on loan to (Austria) LASK)
—	MF	RUS	Andrey Ishutin (to (Belarus) Arsenal Dzerzhinsk, previously on loan to Rostov-2)
—	MF	RUS	Maksim Laykin (on loan to Neftekhimik Nizhnekamsk, previously on loan to Yenisey Krasnoyarsk)
—	MF	RUS	Vitali Shitov (on loan to Tyumen, previously on loan to Torpedo Moscow)
—	FW	RUS	Pavel Melyoshin (to Sochi, previously on loan)

=== Zenit Saint Petersburg ===
In: Note: Flags indicate national team as defined under FIFA eligibility rules; some limited exceptions apply. Players may hold more than one non-FIFA nationality.

No.	Pos.	Nation	Player
6	DF	SLO	Vanja Drkušić (end of loan to (Serbia) Red Star Belgrade)
11	FW	BRA	Luiz Henrique (from (Brazil) Botafogo)
13	GK	RUS	Nikita Goylo (end of loan to Dynamo Makhachkala)
14	MF	SRB	Saša Zdjelar (from CSKA Moscow)
39	FW	RUS	Maksim Khokhlov (from own academy)
43	DF	RUS	Aleksandr Tarasov (from own academy)
53	DF	RUS	Matvey Bardachyov (end of loan to Ural Yekaterinburg)
57	DF	RUS	Nikita Lobov (from Zenit-2 St. Petersburg)
70	DF	SRB	Ognjen Mimović (on loan from (Turkey) Fenerbahçe)
92	DF	RUS	Ivan Shilyonok (from Zenit-2 St. Petersburg)
93	GK	RUS	Maksim Shichanin (from own academy)
95	GK	RUS	Georgy Korolyov (end of loan to Forte Taganrog)
96	GK	RUS	Maksim Zaytsev (from own academy)

Out: Note: Flags indicate national team as defined under FIFA eligibility rules; some limited exceptions apply. Players may hold more than one non-FIFA nationality.

No.	Pos.	Nation	Player
9	FW	BRA	Artur (to (Brazil) Botafogo)
11	MF	BRA	Claudinho (to (Qatar) Al Sadd)
47	DF	RUS	Serafim Abzalilov (to Astrakhan)
49	FW	RUS	Igor Kozlov (to Zenit-2 St. Petersburg)
51	DF	RUS	Yelisey Yemelyanov (to Kuban Krasnodar)
59	DF	RUS	Aleksiy Kostyuk (to (Kyrgyzstan) Neftchi Kochkor-Ata)
69	DF	RUS	Artur Maksimchuk (to Kaluga)
70	MF	RUS	Nikita Vershinin (to Zenit-2 St. Petersburg)
72	MF	RUS	Yevgeny Kim (to Sochi-2)
73	DF	RUS	Kirill Dontsov (end of loan from Rotor Volgograd)
76	FW	RUS	Roman Kolmakov (end of loan from Lokomotiv Moscow)
80	DF	RUS	Ilya Bulygin (to Zenit-2 St. Petersburg)
83	MF	RUS	Kirill Stolbov (to Zenit-2 St. Petersburg)
84	MF	RUS	Ivan Galanin (to Volgar Astrakhan)
86	FW	RUS	Yevgeny Pshennikov (to Zenit-2 St. Petersburg)
88	GK	RUS	Vladimir Pavlov (to Ural-2 Yekaterinburg)
96	FW	RUS	Denis Rubanov (end of loan from Sochi)
98	GK	RUS	Maksim Timofeyev
—	MF	BRA	Du Queiroz (on loan to (Brazil) Sport Recife, previously on loan to (Brazil) Grêmio)
—	FW	FRA	Wilson Isidor (to (England) Sunderland, previously on loan)
