= 2023–24 FC Spartak Moscow season =

FC Spartak Moscow
2023–24 season
- Manager: Guille Abascal (until 14 April); Vladimir Slišković (from 14 April)
- Stadium: Otkritie Arena
- Premier League: 5th
- Russian Cup: Regions Final
- Top goalscorer: League: Théo Bongonda (7); All: Aleksandr Sobolev (10)
- Average home league attendance: 15,286
Home colours	Away colours	Third colours

The 2023–24 season was FC Spartak Moscow's 102nd season in existence and 12th consecutive in the Russian Premier League. They also competed in the Russian Cup, where they reached the Regions Final before being defeated by Baltika Kaliningrad.

== Season events ==
On 29 February, Quincy Promes was detained at the Al Maktoum International Airport on suspicion of leaving the scene of a traffic accident as Spartak were returning to Russia after a mid-season training camp in the UAE. On 12 March, Promes was arrested again and the Netherlands sent an official request for his extradition.

On 14 April, Spartak sacked Head Coach Guille Abascal, with Vladimir Slišković taking over in a temporary capacity.

== Squad ==
As of match played 25 May 2024

No.	Name	Nationality	Position	Date of birth (age)	Signed from	Signed in	Contract ends	Apps.	Goals
57	Aleksandr Selikhov	(Russia)	GK	7 April 1994 (aged 30)	Amkar Perm	2016		93	0
88	Ilya Svinov	(Russia)	GK	25 September 2000 (aged 23)	Fakel Voronezh	2022		3	0
98	Aleksandr Maksimenko	(Russia)	GK	23 February 1998 (aged 26)	Academy	2014		167	0
Defenders
2	Oleg Reabciuk	(Moldova)	DF	16 January 1998 (aged 26)	Olympiacos	2023		19	0
4	Alexis Duarte	(Paraguay)	DF	12 March 2000 (aged 24)	Cerro Porteño	2023	2027	41	0
5	Leon Klassen	(Russia)	DF	29 May 2000 (aged 23)	Tirol	2022	2025	32	2
6	Srđan Babić	(Serbia)	DF	22 April 1996 (aged 28)	Almería	2023		23	3
14	Georgi Dzhikiya	(Russia)	DF	21 November 1993 (aged 30)	Amkar Perm	2016		214	4
20	Tomás Tavares	(Portugal)	DF	7 March 2001 (aged 23)	Benfica	2023	2026	22	1
23	Nikita Chernov	(Russia)	DF	14 January 1996 (aged 28)	Krylia Sovetov	2022	2026	68	1
39	Pavel Maslov	(Russia)	DF	14 April 2000 (aged 24)	Tyumen	2018	2024	75	1
68	Ruslan Litvinov	(Russia)	DF	18 August 2001 (aged 22)	Academy	2018		98	5
97	Daniil Denisov	(Russia)	DF	21 October 2002 (aged 21)	Academy	2020		77	1
Midfielders
8	Victor Moses	(Nigeria)	MF	12 December 1990 (aged 33)	Chelsea	2021	2024	82	10
17	Anton Zinkovsky	(Russia)	MF	14 April 1996 (aged 28)	Krylia Sovetov	2022.	2027	73	7
18	Nail Umyarov	(Russia)	MF	27 June 2000 (aged 23)	Chertanovo Moscow	2019		130	2
19	Jesús Medina	(Paraguay)	MF	30 April 1997 (aged 27)	CSKA Moscow	2023		34	5
22	Mikhail Ignatov	(Russia)	MF	4 May 2000 (aged 24)	Academy	2016		116	9
25	Danil Prutsev	(Russia)	MF	25 March 2000 (aged 24)	Krylia Sovetov	2022	2026	80	4
35	Christopher Martins	(Luxembourg)	MF	19 February 1997 (aged 27)	Young Boys	2022	2026	73	9
47	Roman Zobnin	(Russia)	MF	11 February 1994 (aged 30)	Dynamo Moscow	2016		248	17
77	Théo Bongonda	(Democratic Republic of the Congo)	MF	20 November 1995 (aged 28)	Cádiz	2023		35	8
82	Daniil Khlusevich	(Russia)	MF	26 February 2001 (aged 23)	Arsenal Tula	2021	2026	80	5
91	Anton Roshchin	(Russia)	MF	24 March 2005 (aged 19)	Academy	2023		1	0
Forwards
7	Aleksandr Sobolev	(Russia)	FW	7 March 1997 (aged 27)	Krylia Sovetov	2020		138	54
9	Manfred Ugalde	(Costa Rica)	FW	25 May 2002 (aged 22)	Twente	2024		15	1
10	Quincy Promes	(Netherlands)	FW	4 January 1992 (aged 32)	Ajax	2021	2024	233	114
Away on loan
9	Keita Baldé	(Senegal)	FW	8 March 1995 (aged 29)	Cagliari	2022	2024	19	3
11	Shamar Nicholson	(Jamaica)	FW	16 March 1997 (aged 27)	Charleroi	2022	2026	42	11
13	Maksim Laykin	(Russia)	MF	31 May 2003 (aged 20)	Academy	2020		3	0
70	Pavel Melyoshin	(Russia)	FW	25 March 2004 (aged 20)	Academy	2022		25	4
76	Vitali Shitov	(Russia)	MF	7 May 2003 (aged 21)	Academy	2020		2	0
87	Daniil Zorin	(Russia)	MF	22 February 2004 (aged 20)	Academy	2022		6	0
Players that left Spartak Moscow during the season

== Transfers ==
=== In ===
Date	Position	Nationality	Name	From	Fee	Ref.
26 June 2023	MF	(Russia)	Maksim Nikiforov	Rubin Kazan	Undisclosed	
5 July 2023	DF	(Russia)	Aleksandr Danilov	Konoplyov football academy	Undisclosed	
10 July 2023	MF	(Paraguay)	Jesús Medina	CSKA Moscow	Undisclosed	
12 July 2023	MF	(Democratic Republic of the Congo)	Théo Bongonda	Cádiz	Undisclosed	
7 August 2023	DF	(Moldova)	Oleg Reabciuk	Olympiacos	Undisclosed	
21 August 2023	DF	(Serbia)	Srđan Babić	Almería	Undisclosed	
29 January 2024	FW	(Costa Rica)	Manfred Ugalde	Twente	Undisclosed	
5 February 2024	DF	(Russia)	Ivan Goryainov	Zvezda St.Petersburg	Undisclosed	
5 February 2024	DF	(Russia)	Yegor Guziyev	Chertanovo Moscow	Undisclosed	
5 February 2024	DF	(Russia)	Maksim Karpov	Zvezda St.Petersburg	Undisclosed	
5 February 2024	DF	(Russia)	Yury Koledin	Zvezda St.Petersburg	Undisclosed	
5 February 2024	MF	(Russia)	Nikita Posmashny	Zvezda St.Petersburg	Undisclosed	
5 February 2024	MF	(Russia)	Daniil Stolyarov	Zvezda St.Petersburg	Undisclosed	
8 February 2024	MF	(Russia)	Ivan Ivanov	Chertanovo Moscow	Undisclosed	

=== Out ===
Date	Position	Nationality	Name	To	Fee	Ref.
7 June 2023	FW	(Russia)	Stepan Oganesyan	Orenburg	Undisclosed	
21 June 2023	MF	(Russia)	Konstantin Mishin	Leon Saturn Ramenskoye	Undisclosed	
21 June 2023	MF	(Russia)	Konstantin Mishin	Leon Saturn Ramenskoye	Undisclosed	
27 June 2023	MF	(Belgium)	Maximiliano Caufriez	Clermont	Undisclosed	
18 August 2023	DF	(Russia)	Ilya Golosov	Arsenal Tula	Undisclosed	
22 January 2024	MF	(Russia)	Konstantin Mishin	Leon Saturn Ramenskoye	Undisclosed	

=== Loans out ===
Date from	Position	Nationality	Name	To	Date to	Ref.
2 June 2023	MF	(Czech Republic)	Alex Král	Union Berlin	End of season	
23 June 2023	FW	(Russia)	Ivan Pyatkin	Rotor Volgograd	End of season	
26 June 2023	FW	(Russia)	Vitali Shitov	Tyumen	End of season	
28 June 2023	DF	(Russia)	Maksim Vedeneyev	Kuban Krasnodar	End of season	
5 July 2023	DF	(Russia)	Nikolai Tolstopyatov	Pari NN	End of season	
12 July 2023	FW	(Russia)	Artur Maksimchuk	Salyut Belgorod	End of season	
22 July 2023	DF	(Russia)	Yaroslav Krashevsky	Yenisey Krasnoyarsk	20 February 2024	
4 August 2023	MF	(Russia)	Daniil Zorin	Dinamo Minsk	End of season	
23 August 2023	MF	(Russia)	Konstantin Shiltsov	Rodina Moscow	End of season	
1 September 2023	FW	(Jamaica)	Shamar Nicholson	Clermont	End of season	
1 September 2023	FW	(Senegal)	Keita Baldé	Espanyol	End of season	
5 February 2024	DF	(Russia)	Nikolai Tolstopyatov	Sokol Saratov	End of season	
8 February 2024	FW	(Russia)	Pavel Melyoshin	Dinamo Minsk	31 December 2024	
14 February 2024	MF	(Russia)	Maksim Laykin	Arsenal Tula	End of season	
16 February 2024	MF	(Russia)	Konstantin Shiltsov	Neftekhimik Nizhnekamsk	End of season	
22 February 2024	DF	(Russia)	Yaroslav Krashevsky	Rotor Volgograd	End of season	

=== Released ===
Date	Position	Nationality	Name	Joined	Date	Ref.
9 June 2023	DF	(Russia)	Yegor Chistyakov	Fakel Voronezh		
9 June 2023	MF	(Russia)	Fayziddin Nazhmov	Strogino Moscow		
10 June 2023	MF	(Russia)	Nikita Bakalyuk	Kuban Krasnodar	7 September 2023	
18 June 2023	GK	(Russia)	Anton Shitov	Veles Moscow	14 July 2023	
19 June 2023	GK	(Russia)	Mikhail Volkov	Torpedo Moscow	28 June 2023	
21 June 2023	MF	(Poland)	Maciej Rybus	Rubin Kazan	23 June 2023	
30 June 2023	DF	(Russia)	Danil Trukhanov	Kosmos Dolgoprudny		
30 June 2023	MF	(Russia)	Rodion Kabakov			
30 June 2023	MF	(Russia)	Ilya Levchenkov	Kosmos Dolgoprudny		
30 June 2023	MF	(Russia)	Mikhail Pilipenko	Dynamo Bryansk		
31 December 2023	GK	(Russia)	Aleksandr Ignatyev			
31 December 2023	GK	(Russia)	Anton Migunov			
31 December 2023	DF	(Russia)	Mikhail Kondratyev	Sochi		
31 December 2023	DF	(Russia)	Aleksandr Sergin			
31 December 2023	DF	(Russia)	Timofey Danilov	Rodina-2 Moscow		
31 December 2023	MF	(Russia)	Nikita Kononenko			
31 December 2023	MF	(Russia)	Artemy Gunko	Kosmos Dolgoprudny		
31 December 2023	FW	(Russia)	Timur Kim	Ryazan		
27 June 2024	DF	(Russia)	Leon Klassen	Lyngby	29 August 2024	
30 June 2024	DF	(Russia)	Georgi Dzhikiya	Khimki		
30 June 2024	MF	(Czech Republic)	Alex Král	Union Berlin		
30 June 2024	FW	(Netherlands)	Quincy Promes	United FC	4 September 2024	
30 June 2024	FW	(Nigeria)	Victor Moses	Luton Town	10 September 2024	

== Pre-season and friendlies ==
Win Draw Loss Fixtures

July 2023 Friendly	Spartak Moscow (Russia)	v	(Russia)

== Competitions ==
=== Overall record ===
Competition	First match	Last match	Starting round	Final position	Record							
Competition	First match	Last match	Starting round	Final position	Pld	W	D	L	GF	GA	GD	Win %
Premier League	23 July 2023	25 May 2024	Matchday 1	5th	30	14	8	8	41	32	+9	46.67
Russian Cup	27 July 2023	14 May 2024	Group stage	Regions Final	12	6	1	5	22	17	+5	50.00
Total					42	20	9	13	63	49	+14	47.62

Last updated: 25 May 2024
Source: Soccerway

=== Premier League ===
==== League table ====
Pos	Team	Pld	W	D	L	GF	GA	GD	Pts
3	Dynamo Moscow	30	16	8	6	53	39	+14	56 (Note: Krasnodar is ahead of Dynamo on head-to-head points: Krasnodar 6, Dynamo 0)
4	Lokomotiv Moscow	30	14	11	5	52	38	+14	53
5	Spartak Moscow	30	14	8	8	41	32	+9	50
6	CSKA Moscow	30	12	12	6	56	40	+16	48
7	Rostov	30	12	7	11	43	46	−3	43

Source: Premier Liga
Rules for classification: 1) Points; 2) Head-to-head points; 3) Head-to-head matches won; 4) Head-to-head goal difference; 5) Head-to-head goals scored; 6) Matches won; 7) Goal difference; 8) Goals scored; 9) 2022–23 position (not applicable to final standings); 10) Play-off. Note: if teams tied on points played an equal number of head-to-head games, head-to-head results are considered in aggregate, in a separate 'table'. If teams tied on points played a different number of head-to-head games, head-to-head criteria are considered in one-on-one pairs for each team against each other, then the teams are ordered by the number of one-on-one matchups they have advantage in.

==== Results summary ====
Overall								Home						Away					
Pld	W	D	L	GF	GA	GD	Pts	W	D	L	GF	GA	GD	W	D	L	GF	GA	GD
30	14	8	8	41	32	+9	50	10	3	2	24	14	+10	4	5	6	17	18	−1

Last updated: 25 May 2024.

==== Results by round ====
Round	1	2	3	4	5	6	7	8	9	10	11	12	13	14	15	16	17	18	19	20	22	23	24	25	21^{1}	26	27	28	29	30
Ground	H	H	A	A	H	H	A	H	H	A	H	H	A	A	H	A	A	H	A	H	H	A	A	A	A	H	A	H	H	A
Result	W	W	W	L	L	D	L	W	W	L	D	W	L	D	W	W	L	W	D	L	D	W	L	W	D	W	D	W	W	D
Position	4	2	1	4	6	7	9	6	4	5	5	4	6	6	6	4	7	5	4	6	6	7	4	4	6	4	5	5	5	5

Updated to match(es) played on 25 May 2024. Source: See Results
A = Away; H = Home; W = Win; D = Draw; L = Loss

==== Matches ====
The league fixtures were unveiled on 24 June 2023.

23 July 2023 1	Spartak Moscow	3–2	Orenburg	Moscow
17:30 MSK (UTC+3)	Moses 45+'; Melyoshin (yellow card) 65'; Khlusevich 76', 90+'; Baldé (yellow card) 90+'	Report	Florentín (yellow card) 45+' (goal) 67'; Vorobyov 51'; Pérez (yellow card) 65'; Mansilla (yellow card) 79'; Sysuyev (yellow card) 88'	Stadium: Otkritie Arena; Attendance: 11,466; Referee: Artyom Chistyakov

31 July 2023 2	Spartak Moscow	2–1	Baltika Kaliningrad	Moscow
19:30 MSK (UTC+3)	Bongonda 43'; Umyarov (yellow card) 61'; Promes 84'; Martins (yellow card) 90+'	Report	Radmanovac (yellow card) 78'; Henríquez 90'	Stadium: Otkritie Arena; Attendance: 10,992; Referee: Pavel Kukuyan

5 August 2023 3	Rubin Kazan	1–4	Spartak Moscow	Kazan
17:30 MSK (UTC+3)	Fameyeh (yellow card) 24'; Iwu 39'; Apshatsev (yellow card) 71'; Lisakovich (yellow card) 84'; Gritsayenko (yellow card) 90+1'	Report	Bongonda 19'; Khlusevich (yellow card) 35'; Medina 59'; Ignatov 68'; Promes 73'	Stadium: Ak Bars Arena; Attendance: 17,806; Referee: Evgeny Kukulyak

11 August 2023 4	Ural Yekaterinburg	3–2	Spartak Moscow	Yekaterinburg
18:00 MSK (UTC+3)	Miškić (penalty missed) 11' 45+'; Yushin (yellow card) 38'; Beveyev (yellow card) 44'; Guilherme (yellow card) 68' (yellow-red card) 90+'; Begić (yellow card) 87'; Yegorychev 90'; Bicfalvi 90+'	Report	Sobolev (yellow card) 28' (goal) 81'; Bongonda 53'; Dzhikiya (yellow card) 88'; Khlusevich (yellow card) 90+'	Stadium: Central Stadium; Attendance: 19,385; Referee: Kirill Levnikov

20 August 2023 5	Spartak Moscow	1–3	Zenit St.Petersburg	Moscow
19:30 MSK (UTC+3)	Ignatov (yellow card) 10'; Sobolev 81' (pen.)	Report	Wendel 32', 73'; Cassierra 90+4' (yellow card) 90+6'	Stadium: Otkritie Arena; Attendance: 33,852; Referee: Sergei Karasev

26 August 2023 6	Spartak Moscow	0–0	Akhmat Grozny	Moscow
19:30 MSK (UTC+3)	Umyarov (yellow card) 55'	Report	Oleynikov (yellow card) 53'; Sheliya (yellow card) 90+'	Stadium: Lukoil Arena; Attendance: 12,086; Referee: Rafael Shafeev

2 September 2023 7	Krasnodar	2–0	Spartak Moscow	Krasnodar
20:00 MSK (UTC+3)	Córdoba (yellow card) 20' (goal) 40'; Olusegun (yellow card) 58'; Spertsyan 84' (pen.); Kady (yellow card) 90+'	Report	Selikhov (yellow card) 81'; Medina (yellow card) 87'	Stadium: Krasnodar Stadium; Attendance: 32,766; Referee: Alexey Sukhoi

16 September 2023 8	Spartak Moscow	1–0	Sochi	Moscow
19:00 MSK (UTC+3)	Khlusevich (yellow card) 29'; Babić 90+'; Sobolev (yellow card) 90+'	Report	Batyrev (yellow card) 4'; Zabolotny (yellow card) 88'	Stadium: Lukoil Arena; Attendance: 8,760; Referee: Artyom Chistyakov

23 September 2023 9	Spartak Moscow	1–0	Dynamo Moscow	Moscow
15:00 MSK (UTC+3)	Bongonda 7'; Maksimenko (yellow card) 84'; Denisov (yellow card) 87'; Sobolev (yellow card) 90+6'	Report	Chávez (yellow card) 90+2'	Stadium: Lukoil Arena; Attendance: 19,025; Referee: Pavel Kukuyan

1 October 2023 10	Krylia Sovetov	4–0	Spartak Moscow	Samara
16:30 MSK (UTC+3)	Gorshkov 7', 25'; Rahmanović (yellow card) 36'; Garré (yellow card) 41' (goal) 78'; Fernando (yellow card) 86'; Shitov 90' (yellow card) 90+'	Report	Sobolev (yellow card) 80'; Ignatov (yellow card) 83'; Duarte (yellow card) 85'	Stadium: Solidarnost Samara Arena; Attendance: 23,225; Referee: Rafael Shafeev

8 October 2023 11	Spartak Moscow	2–2	CSKA Moscow	Moscow
19:00 MSK (UTC+3)	Promes 39'; Reabciuk (yellow card) 68'; Medina 90+6'	Report	Gajić 31', 60', (yellow card) 90+6'; Moisés (yellow card) 80'; Fayzullaev (yellow card) 90'	Stadium: Otkritie Arena; Attendance: 25,245; Referee: Kirill Levnikov

22 October 2023 12	Spartak Moscow	2–0	Pari NN	Moscow
14:00 MSK (UTC+3)	Prutsev 41'; Martins 90+'	Report	Gotsuk (red card) 82'; Troshechkin (yellow card) 90+'; Kakkoyev (yellow card) 90+'	Stadium: Otkritie Arena; Attendance: 10,201; Referee: Alexey Amelin

28 October 2023 13	Fakel Voronezh	2–0	Spartak Moscow	Voronezh
14:00 MSK (UTC+3)	Bozhin (yellow card) 29'; Markov 71' (pen.); Maksimov 83'	Report	Babić (yellow card) 36' (yellow-red card) 70'; Duarte (yellow card) 68'; Umyarov (yellow card) 86'	Stadium: Tsentralnyi Profsoyuz Stadion; Attendance: 11,612; Referee: Vladislav Bezborodov

5 November 2023 14	Lokomotiv Moscow	1–1	Spartak Moscow	Moscow
19:30 MSK (UTC+3)	Barinov (yellow card) 45+1'; Miranchuk (yellow card) 49'; Dzyuba 64'	Report	Khlusevich (red card) 38'; Zinkovsky 53'; Ignatov (yellow card) 60'	Stadium: RZD Arena; Attendance: 14,523; Referee: Pavel Kukuyan

12 November 2023 15	Spartak Moscow	2–1	Rostov	Moscow
19:30 MSK (UTC+3)	Ignatov 4'; Promes 15'	Report	Osipenko 81' (pen.)	Stadium: Otkritie Arena; Attendance: 10,517; Referee: Kirill Levnikov

25 November 2023 16	Baltika Kaliningrad	0–2	Spartak Moscow	Kaliningrad
19:45 MSK (UTC+3)	Soto (yellow card) 52'	Report	Khlusevich 32'; Medina (yellow card) 39'; Babić (yellow card) 80'; Promes 88'	Stadium: Kaliningrad Stadium; Attendance: 16,267; Referee: Rafael Shafeev

3 December 2023 17	Akhmat Grozny	2–1	Spartak Moscow	Grozny
19:00 MSK (UTC+3)	Timofeyev (yellow card) 12'; Agalarov 35'; Berisha (yellow card) 36'; Kovachev 47'; Utsiyev (yellow card) 90+'	Report	Ignatov (yellow card) 27'; Zinkovsky 44'; Litvinov (yellow card) 62'	Stadium: Akhmat-Arena; Attendance: 4,643; Referee: Evgeniy Kukulyak

9 December 2023 18	Spartak Moscow	3–0	Krylia Sovetov	Moscow
14:00 MSK (UTC+3)	Promes 2' (yellow card) 75'; Sobolev 8'; Umyarov (yellow card) 19'; Martins 50'	Report	Rahmanović (yellow card) 11'	Stadium: Otkritie Arena; Attendance: 7,217; Referee: Pavel Kukuyan

2 March 2024 19	Zenit St.Petersburg	0–0	Spartak Moscow	Saint Petersburg
16:00 MSK (UTC+3)	Eraković (yellow card) 59'; Douglas Santos (yellow card) 77'; Barrios (yellow card) 88'; Wendel (yellow card) 90'	Report	Duarte (yellow card) 22'; Khlusevich (yellow card) 80'; Martins (yellow card) 82'; Prutsev (yellow card) 90'	Stadium: Krestovsky Stadium; Attendance: 57,858; Referee: Sergei Karasev

10 March 2024 20	Spartak Moscow	0–2	Fakel Voronezh	Moscow
19:00 MSK (UTC+3)	Prutsev (yellow card) 16'; Martins (yellow card) 36'; Babić (yellow card) 45+'; Moses (yellow card) 83'; Litvinov (yellow card) 89'; Sobolev (yellow card) 90+'	Report	Magal (yellow card) 14'; Kvekveskiri (yellow card) 18'; Appayev (yellow card) 26'; Markov 37' (pen.); Cherov (yellow card) 62'; Prutsev 66' (o.g.); Belenov (yellow card) 90+'; Bozhin (yellow card) 90+'	Stadium: Otkritie Arena; Attendance: 11,640; Referee: Artyom Lyubimov

30 March 2023 22	Spartak Moscow	0–0	Ural	Moscow
19:00 MSK (UTC+3)	Ugalde (yellow card) 83' Khlusevich (yellow card) 90+'	Report	Miškić (yellow card) 35'; Kulakov (yellow card) 72'; Kiki (yellow card) 76'; Filipenko (yellow card) 83'	Stadium: Otkritie Arena; Attendance: 8,544; Referee: Vladimir Moskalyov

7 April 2024 23	Dynamo Moscow	1–2	Spartak Moscow	Moscow
19:30 MSK (UTC+3)	Chávez 5' (pen.); Smolov (yellow card) 77'	Report	Medina (yellow card) 54'; Umyarov (yellow card) 56'; Sobolev (yellow card) 57', (goal) 74', 87'; Klassen (yellow card) 83'	Stadium: VTB Arena; Attendance: 18,072; Referee: Kirill Levnikov

13 April 2024 24	Sochi	1–0	Spartak Moscow	Sochi
14:00 MSK (UTC+3)	Attiyat Allah 76'; Miguel (yellow card) 80'; Zabolotny (yellow card) 90+4'	Report	Khlusevich (yellow card) 80'	Stadium: Fisht Olympic Stadium; Attendance: 8,855; Referee: Rafael Shafeev

21 April 2024 25	Rostov	1–5	Spartak Moscow	Rostov-on-Don
20:30 MSK (UTC+3)	Osipenko (yellow card) 12'; Mohebi (yellow card) 15'; Golenkov 36'; Chernov (yellow card) 45+'	Report	Khlusevich 16'; Babić (yellow card) 39'; Medina 54', 60' (pen.); Martins 76'; Sobolev (yellow card) 80'; Bongonda 90+'	Stadium: Rostov Arena; Attendance: 30,593; Referee: Vladimir Moskalyov

25 April 2024 21	CSKA Moscow	0–0	Spartak Moscow	Moscow
20:30 MSK (UTC+3)	Moisés (yellow card) 89'	Report	Duarte (yellow card) 45'	Stadium: VEB Arena; Attendance: 18,495; Referee: Vasily Kazartsev

28 April 2024 26	Spartak Moscow	3–2	Lokomotiv Moscow	Moscow
16:15 MSK (UTC+3)	Bongonda 44' (pen.); Umyarov (yellow card) 48'; Medina 56'; Khlusevich 67'; Martins (yellow card) 73'	Report	Suleymanov 51'; Sarveli 71'	Stadium: Otkritie Arena; Attendance: 20,016; Referee: Kirill Levnikov

5 May 2024 27	Pari NN	0–0	Spartak Moscow	Nizhny Novgorod
19:00 MSK (UTC+3)	Gotsuk (yellow card) 33'	Report	Ugalde (yellow card) 18'	Stadium: Nizhny Novgorod Stadium; Attendance: 13,233; Referee: Pavel Shadykhanov

11 May 2024 28	Spartak Moscow	1–0	Krasnodar	Moscow
16:30 MSK (UTC+3)	Zobnin 35'	Report	Kaio (yellow card) 81'	Stadium: Lukoil Arena; Attendance: 21,843; Referee: Artyom Chistyakov

19 May 2024 29	Spartak Moscow	3–1	Rubin Kazan	Moscow
13:15 MSK (UTC+3)	Umyarov (yellow card) 5'; Bongonda 20'; Zobnin 28' (yellow card) 86'; Martins 64'; Khlusevich (yellow card) 78'; Chernov (yellow card) 81'	Report	Rozhkov (yellow card) 72'; Teslenko (yellow card) 73'; Daku 77'	Stadium: Lukoil Arena; Attendance: 17,881; Referee: Vladimir Moskalyov

25 May 2024 30	Orenburg	0–0	Spartak Moscow	Orenburg
16:30 MSK (UTC+3)	Pérez (yellow card) 79'; Oganesyan (yellow card) 88'	Report	Litvinov (yellow card) 55'; Maksimenko (yellow card) 79'	Stadium: Gazovik Stadium; Attendance: 8,076; Referee: Sergey Ivanov

=== Russian Cup ===
==== Group stage ====
Pos	Team	Pld	W	PW	PL	L	GF	GA	GD	Pts	Qualification
1	Spartak Moscow	6	4	0	0	2	16	12	+4	12	Qualification to the Knockout phase (RPL path)
2	Dynamo Moscow	6	3	0	2	1	12	10	+2	11 (Note: Head-to-head points: Dynamo 4, Krasnodar 2.)	Qualification to the Knockout phase (RPL path)
3	Krasnodar	6	3	1	0	2	12	9	+3	11	Qualification to the Knockout phase (regions path)
4	Pari Nizhny Novgorod	6	0	1	0	5	6	15	−9	2	

Source: Russian Football Union (in Russian), Soccerway
Rules for classification: 1) Points; 2) Head-to-head points; 3) Head-to-head matches won; 4) Head-to-head goal difference; 5) Head-to-head goals scored; 6) Matches won; 7) Goal difference; 8) Goals scored; 9) Penalty shoot-out goal difference; 10) Draw.
Notes:

27 July 2023 1	Krasnodar	1–2	Spartak Moscow	Krasnodar
20:00 MSK (UTC+3)	Spertsyan (red card) 44'; Córdoba (yellow card) 45+2'; Arutyunyan (yellow card) 88'; Borges (yellow card) 90' (goal) 90+5'	Report	Zobnin 21'; Ignatov (yellow card) 47'; Bogonda 67'; Klassen (yellow card) 79'	Stadium: Krasnodar Stadium; Attendance: 31,733; Referee: Aleksey Sukhoy

8 August 2023 2	Spartak Moscow	5–4	Pari NN	Moscow
20:45 MSK (UTC+3)	Klassen 9' (yellow card) 44'; Prutsev 15'; Melyoshin 36'; Duarte (yellow card) 61'; Ignatov 80'; Promes 89'; Reabciuk (yellow card) 90'	Report	Suleymanov (yellow card) 21' (goal) 29', 56' (pen.); Sevikyan 46'; Aleksandrov 50'; Botnar (yellow card) 68'; Jiyanov (yellow card) 80'	Stadium: Otkritie Arena; Attendance: 13,323; Referee: Sergey Tsyganok

29 August 2023 3	Spartak Moscow	4–1	Dynamo Moscow	Moscow
19:30 MSK (UTC+3)	Sobolev 6', 18'; Babić 15'; Zinkovsky 24'; Medina (yellow card) 68'; Reabciuk (yellow card) 76'	Report	Parshivlyuk (yellow card) 14'; Lesovoy (yellow card) 45+1'; Ngamaleu 65'; Carrascal (yellow card) 80'; Laxalt (yellow card) 86'; Gagnidze (yellow card) 90+3'	Stadium: Otkritie Arena; Attendance: 19,208; Referee: Vitaly Meshkov

19 September 2023 4	Pari NN	0–3	Spartak Moscow	Nizhny Novgorod
17:15 MSK (UTC+3)	Stotsky (yellow card) 23'; Gotsuk (yellow card) 90'; Karapuzov (yellow card) 90+5'	Report	Klassen 27'; Prutsev (yellow card) 44'; Dzhikiya (yellow card) 45+2'; Denisov (yellow card) 81'; Martins 90+1'; Promes (yellow card) 90+5' (goal) 90+6'	Stadium: Nizhny Novgorod Stadium; Attendance: 32,189; Referee: Yevgeny Bulanov

4 October 2023 5	Dynamo Moscow	3–0	Spartak Moscow	Moscow
16:45 MSK (UTC+3)	Marichal (yellow card) 31'; Bitello 43'; Fomin 45' Zazvonkin 90+5'	Report	Maslov (yellow card) 30'; Prutsev (yellow card) 48'; Chernov (yellow card) 71'	Stadium: VTB Arena; Attendance: 18,205; Referee: Vladimir Moskalyov

1 November 2023 6	Spartak Moscow	2–3	Krasnodar	Moscow
20:45 MSK (UTC+3)	Sobolev 8' (pen.) (yellow card) 86'; Umyarov 45+1'; Klassen (yellow card) 72'	Report	Koksharov 3', 61' (yellow card) 90+6'; Krivtsov (yellow card) 19'; Denisov 74' (o.g.); Agkatsev (yellow card) 83'; Banjac (yellow card) 90+8'	Stadium: Lukoil Arena; Attendance: 11,280; Referee: Yevgeni Bulanov

==== Knockout stage ====
29 November 2023 RPL path Quarter-finals 1st leg	Orenburg	1–0	Spartak Moscow	Orenburg
16:00 MSK (UTC+3)	Titkov 11' (pen.) (yellow card) 33'; Oganesyan (yellow card) 55'	Report	Reabciuk (red card) 40'; Medina (yellow card) 90+1'	Stadium: Gazovik Stadium; Attendance: 5,438; Referee: Aleksey Sukhoy

14 March 2024 RPL path Quarter-finals 2nd leg	Spartak Moscow	3–1 (3–2 agg.)	Orenburg	Moscow
18:00 MSK (UTC+3)	Sobolev 36'; Zinkovsky 64'; Babić 68'; Selikhov (yellow card) 90'	Report	Ghorbani 10' (yellow card) 20'; Gojković (yellow card) 14'; Poluyakhtov (yellow card) 45+1' (yellow-red card) 84'	Stadium: Lukoil Arena; Attendance: 10,321; Referee: Vladislav Bezborodov

3 April 2024 RPL path Semi-finals 1st leg	Spartak Moscow	1–2	Zenit St.Petersburg	Moscow
20:30 MSK (UTC+3)	Ugalde 12' (yellow card) 41'; Umyarov (yellow card) 57'; Babić (yellow card) 59'	Report	Alip (yellow card) 41'; Pedro 55', 65' (yellow card) 67'; Sergeyev (yellow card) 90+6'	Stadium: Lukoil Arena; Attendance: 23,849; Referee: Sergei Karasev

17 April 2024 RPL path Semi-finals 2nd leg	Zenit St.Petersburg	0–0 (2–1 agg.)	Spartak Moscow	Saint Petersburg
19:30 MSK (UTC+3)		Report	Ugalde (yellow card) 78'; Sobolev (yellow card) 90+1'	Stadium: Krestovsky Stadium; Attendance: 56,470; Referee: Aleksey Sukhoy

1 May 2024 Regions path Semi-finals Stage 2	Dynamo Moscow	0–2	Spartak Moscow	Moscow
18:00 MSK (UTC+3)	Smolov (yellow card) 56'; Carrascal (yellow card) 78'	Report	Sobolev 9'; Ignatov 39'; Prutsev (yellow card) 59'	Stadium: VTB Arena; Attendance: 25,512; Referee: Aleksey Sukhoy

14 May 2024 Regions Final	Baltika Kaliningrad	1–0	Spartak Moscow	Kaliningrad
20:45 MSK (UTC+3)	Andrade 4'; Kaplenko (yellow card) 18'; Fernandes (yellow card) 90+6'	Report	Litvinov (yellow card) 15'	Stadium: Rostec Arena; Attendance: 26,717; Referee: Vladislav Bezborodov

== Squad statistics ==
As of match played 25 May 2024

=== Appearances and goals ===
No.	Pos	Nat	Player	Total		Premier League		Russian Cup	
No.	Pos	Nat	Player	Apps	Goals	Apps	Goals	Apps	Goals
2	DF	(Moldova) MDA	Oleg Reabciuk	19	0	11+2	0	3+3	0
4	DF	(Paraguay) PAR	Alexis Duarte	33	0	26+1	0	4+2	0
5	DF	(Russia) RUS	Leon Klassen	11	2	2+3	0	4+2	2
6	DF	(Serbia) SRB	Srđan Babić	23	3	16+1	1	6	2
7	FW	(Russia) RUS	Aleksandr Sobolev	34	10	19+8	5	7	5
8	MF	(Nigeria) NGR	Victor Moses	19	1	8+8	1	1+2	0
9	FW	(Costa Rica) CRC	Manfred Ugalde	15	1	9+2	0	2+2	1
10	FW	(Netherlands) NED	Quincy Promes	21	8	17	6	1+3	2
14	DF	(Russia) RUS	Georgi Dzhikiya	12	0	6+2	0	3+1	0
17	MF	(Russia) RUS	Anton Zinkovsky	37	4	15+11	2	7+4	2
18	MF	(Russia) RUS	Nail Umyarov	34	1	11+12	0	8+3	1
19	MF	(Paraguay) PAR	Jesús Medina	34	5	16+8	5	5+5	0
20	DF	(Portugal) POR	Tomás Tavares	4	0	0+3	0	1	0
22	MF	(Russia) RUS	Mikhail Ignatov	35	4	12+12	2	9+2	2
23	DF	(Russia) RUS	Nikita Chernov	29	0	9+8	0	10+2	0
25	MF	(Russia) RUS	Danil Prutsev	34	2	18+5	1	9+2	1
35	MF	(Luxembourg) LUX	Christopher Martins	36	5	15+10	4	4+7	1
39	DF	(Russia) RUS	Pavel Maslov	9	0	2+2	0	4+1	0
47	MF	(Russia) RUS	Roman Zobnin	28	3	18+3	2	3+4	1
57	GK	(Russia) RUS	Aleksandr Selikhov	11	0	5	0	6	0
68	DF	(Russia) RUS	Ruslan Litvinov	31	0	15+9	0	3+4	0
77	MF	(Democratic Republic of the Congo) COD	Théo Bongonda	35	8	16+9	7	4+6	1
82	MF	(Russia) RUS	Daniil Khlusevich	34	5	20+4	5	9+1	0
88	GK	(Russia) RUS	Ilya Svinov	3	0	2	0	1	0
91	MF	(Russia) RUS	Anton Roshchin	1	0	0+1	0	0	0
97	DF	(Russia) RUS	Daniil Denisov	29	0	18+2	0	7+2	0
98	GK	(Russia) RUS	Aleksandr Maksimenko	29	0	23+1	0	5	0
Players away from the club on loan:
9	FW	(Senegal) SEN	Keita Baldé	3	0	0+2	0	1	0
13	MF	(Russia) RUS	Maksim Laykin	3	0	0+2	0	1	0
70	FW	(Russia) RUS	Pavel Melyoshin	8	1	1+2	0	4+1	1
Players who appeared for Spartak Moscow but left during the season:

=== Goal scorers ===
Place	Position	Nation	Number	Name	Premier League	Russian Cup	Total
1	FW	(Russia)	7	Aleksandr Sobolev	5	5	10
2	MF	(Democratic Republic of the Congo)	77	Théo Bongonda	7	1	8
2	FW	(Netherlands)	10	Quincy Promes	6	2	8
4	MF	(Russia)	82	Daniil Khlusevich	5	0	5
4	MF	(Paraguay)	19	Jesús Medina	5	0	5
4	MF	(Luxembourg)	35	Christopher Martins	4	1	5
7	MF	(Russia)	17	Anton Zinkovsky	2	2	4
7	MF	(Russia)	22	Mikhail Ignatov	2	2	4
9	MF	(Russia)	47	Roman Zobnin	2	1	3
9	DF	(Serbia)	6	Srđan Babić	1	2	3
11	MF	(Russia)	25	Danil Prutsev	1	1	2
11	DF	(Russia)	5	Leon Klassen	0	2	2
13	MF	(Nigeria)	8	Victor Moses	1	0	1
13	FW	(Russia)	70	Pavel Melyoshin	0	1	1
13	MF	(Russia)	18	Nail Umyarov	0	1	1
13	FW	(Costa Rica)	9	Manfred Ugalde	0	1	1
Total					41	22	63

=== Clean sheets ===
Place	Position	Nation	Number	Name	Premier League	Russian Cup	Total
1	GK	(Russia)	98	Aleksandr Maksimenko	9	2	11
2	GK	(Russia)	57	Aleksandr Selikhov	3	1	4
Total					12	3	15

=== Disciplinary record ===
Number	Nation	Position	Name	Premier League		Russian Cup		Total	
Number	Nation	Position	Name	Yellow card	Red card	Yellow card	Red card	Yellow card	Red card
2	(Moldova)	DF	Oleg Reabciuk	1	0	2	1	3	1
4	(Paraguay)	DF	Alexis Duarte	4	0	1	0	5	0
5	(Russia)	DF	Leon Klassen	1	0	3	0	4	0
6	(Serbia)	DF	Srđan Babić	5	1	1	0	6	1
7	(Russia)	FW	Aleksandr Sobolev	7	0	2	0	9	0
8	(Nigeria)	MF	Victor Moses	1	0	0	0	1	0
9	(Costa Rica)	FW	Manfred Ugalde	2	0	2	0	4	0
10	(Netherlands)	FW	Quincy Promes	1	0	1	0	2	0
14	(Russia)	DF	Georgi Dzhikiya	1	0	1	0	2	0
18	(Russia)	MF	Nail Umyarov	7	0	1	0	8	0
19	(Paraguay)	MF	Jesús Medina	3	0	2	0	5	0
22	(Russia)	MF	Mikhail Ignatov	4	0	1	0	5	0
23	(Russia)	DF	Nikita Chernov	1	0	1	0	2	0
25	(Russia)	MF	Danil Prutsev	2	0	3	0	5	0
35	(Luxembourg)	MF	Christopher Martins	4	0	0	0	4	0
39	(Russia)	DF	Pavel Maslov	0	0	1	0	1	0
47	(Russia)	MF	Roman Zobnin	1	0	0	0	1	0
57	(Russia)	GK	Aleksandr Selikhov	1	0	1	0	2	0
68	(Russia)	DF	Ruslan Litvinov	3	0	1	0	4	0
82	(Russia)	MF	Daniil Khlusevich	7	1	0	0	7	1
97	(Russia)	DF	Daniil Denisov	1	0	1	0	2	0
98	(Russia)	GK	Aleksandr Maksimenko	2	0	0	0	2	0
Players away on loan:
9	(Senegal)	FW	Keita Baldé	1	0	0	0	1	0
70	(Russia)	FW	Pavel Melyoshin	1	0	0	0	1	0
Players who left Spartak Moscow during the season:
Total				61	2	25	1	86	3
