= 2024–25 FC Orenburg season =

FC Orenburg
2024–25 season
- Stadium: Gazovik Stadium
- Russian Premier League: 6th
- Average home league attendance: 4,520
- Biggest win: Orenburg 2–0 Spartak Moscow
- All statistics correct as of 21 July 2024.

The 2024–25 season is the 49th season in the history of FC Orenburg, and the club's third consecutive season in Russian Premier League. In addition to the domestic league, the team is scheduled to participate in the Russian Cup.

== Transfers ==
=== In ===
Pos.	Player	Transferred to	Fee	Date	Source
DF	(Russia) Georgi Zotov	(Russia) Krylia Sovetov Samara	Free	4 July 2024	
FW	(Iran) Saeid Saharkhizan	(Iran) Gol Gohar Sirjan	Undisclosed	9 July 2024	

=== Out ===
Pos.	Player	Transferred to	Fee	Date	Source
FW	(Russia) Dmitry Vorobyov	(Russia) Lokomotiv Moscow	€2,500,000	1 July 2024	
MF	(Argentina) Lucas Vera	(Russia) Khimki		10 July 2024	
MF	(Russia) Danil Kapustyansky	(Russia) Amkar Perm	Loan	25 July 2024	

== Friendlies ==
=== Pre-season ===
6 July 2024 Friendly	Ankara Keçiörengücü (Turkey)	1–0	(Russia) Orenburg	Turkey
17:00

7 July 2024 Friendly	Orenburg (Russia)	2–1	(Azerbaijan) Sumgayit FK	Turkey
17:00 UTC+3	83'; 88'		40' (o.g.)

10 July 2024 Friendly	Esenler Erokspor (Turkey)	0–2	(Russia) Orenburg	Turkey
16:00 UTC+3

== Competitions ==
=== Overall record ===
Competition	First match	Last match	Starting round	Record							
Competition	First match	Last match	Starting round	Pld	W	D	L	GF	GA	GD	Win %
Russian Premier League	19–22 July 2024	24 May 2025	Matchday 1	1	1	0	0	2	0	+2	100.00
Russian Cup	31 July 2024			0	0	0	0	0	0	+0	—
Total				1	1	0	0	2	0	+2	100.00

Last updated: 21 July 2024
Source: Soccerway

=== Russian Premier League ===
==== League table ====
Pos	Team	Pld	W	D	L	GF	GA	GD	Pts	Qualification or relegation
12	Khimki (D, R)	30	6	11	13	35	56	−21	29 (Note: Dynamo Makhachkala 4–1 Khimki, Khimki 1–1 Dynamo Makhachkala)	Administratively relegated, then dissolved. (Note: Khimki were not issued the 2025–26 RPL license and were administratively relegated. They were replaced by Pari Nizhny Novgorod. Khimki were then dissolved.)
13	Pari Nizhny Novgorod (X)	30	7	6	17	27	54	−27	27	Qualification to relegation play-offs
14	Akhmat Grozny (O)	30	4	13	13	27	48	−21	25	Qualification to relegation play-offs
15	Orenburg (Note: Orenburg was originally relegated, then returned to Russian Premier League on 11 July 2025 to replace Torpedo Moscow which was originally promoted and then removed from the league for attempted match-fixing in the previous season.)	30	4	7	19	28	56	−28	19	
16	Fakel Voronezh (R)	30	2	12	16	14	42	−28	18	Relegation to First League

Source: Premier Liga
Rules for classification: 1) Points; 2) Head-to-head points; 3) Head-to-head matches won; 4) Head-to-head goal difference; 5) Head-to-head goals scored; 6) Matches won; 7) Goal difference; 8) Goals scored; 9) 2023–24 position (not applicable to final standings); 10) Play-off. Note: if teams tied on points did not play an equal number of head-to-head games, head-to-head results are not considered for the standings.
(D) Disqualified; (O) Play-off winners; (R) Relegated; (X) Lost in the play-offs, reprieved from relegation after Khimki was administratively relegated.

==== Results summary ====
Overall								Home						Away					
Pld	W	D	L	GF	GA	GD	Pts	W	D	L	GF	GA	GD	W	D	L	GF	GA	GD
1	1	0	0	2	0	+2	3	1	0	0	2	0	+2	0	0	0	0	0	0

Last updated: 21 July 2024.

==== Results by round ====
Round	1	2
Ground	H	H
Result	W	
Position		

A = Away; H = Home; W = Win; D = Draw; L = Loss

==== Matches ====
The match schedule was released on 20 June 2024.

21 July 2024 1	Orenburg	2–0	Spartak Moscow	Orenburg
19:30 YEKT	Pérez (yellow card) 43', (goal) 62'; Gürlük 67'; Muro (yellow card) 88'	Report	Umyarov (yellow card) 23'; Khlusevich (yellow card) 80'	Stadium: Gazovik Stadium; Attendance: 7,270; Referee: Aleksey Sukhoy

28 July 2024 2	Orenburg	0-0	Akhmat Grozny	Orenburg
19:30 YEKT	Pérez (yellow card) 38'; Ghorbani (yellow card) 60'	Report	Kovachev (yellow card) 19'; Ghandri (yellow card) 40'; Berisha (yellow card) 71'	Stadium: Gazovik Stadium; Attendance: 5,673; Referee: Yan Bobrovskiy

4 August 2024 3	CSKA Moscow	5-1	Orenburg	Orenburg
18:30 YEKT	Musayev 23'; Moisés (yellow card) 26'; Diveyev 30', 59'; Oblyakov 39'; Khellven 71'; Koïta (yellow card) 90+1'	Report	Sidorov (yellow card) 25'; Rybchinsky 31'; Bašić (yellow card) 89'	Stadium: Gazovik Stadium; Attendance: 9,959; Referee: Sergey Ivanov

10 August 2024 4	Orenburg	v	Akron Tolyatti	Orenburg
20:30 YEKT				Stadium: Gazovik Stadium

=== Russian Cup ===
==== Group stage ====
31 July 2024 1	Khimki	1-0	Orenburg	Khimki
16:00 MSK (UTC+3)	Magomedov 90'	Report		Stadium: Arena Khimki
