= Alexis Duarte =

Paraguayan footballer (born 2000)

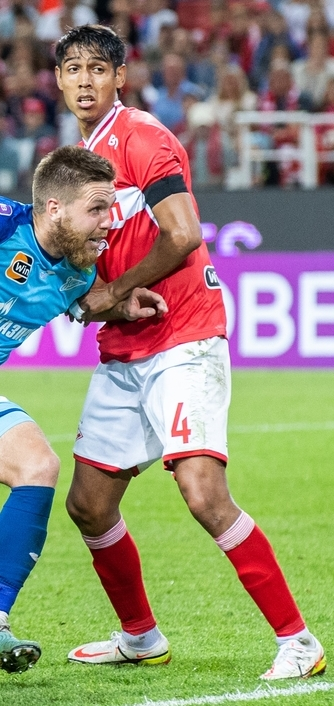
- Duarte playing for Spartak Moscow in 2023

Personal information
- Full name: Alexis David Duarte Pereira
- Date of birth: 12 March 2000 (age 26)
- Place of birth: Itauguá, Paraguay
- Height: 1.86 m (6 ft 1 in)
- Position: Centre-back

Team information
- Current team: Libertad (on loan from Santos)
- Number: 16

Youth career
- 2013–2019: Cerro Porteño

Senior career*
Years	Team	Apps	(Gls)
2018–2023	Cerro Porteño	92	(1)
2023–2025	Spartak Moscow	55	(0)
2025–	Santos	6	(0)
2026–	→ Libertad (loan)	1	(0)

International career^{‡}
2017	Paraguay U17	6	(0)
2019	Paraguay U20	4	(0)
2025–	Paraguay	1	(0)
- * Club domestic league appearances and goals as of 20:56, 22 April 2026 (UTC) ‡ National team caps and goals as of 15:27, 19 November 2025 (UTC)

Alexis David Duarte Pereira (born 12 March 2000) is a Paraguayan professional footballer who plays as a centre-back for Libertad, on loan from Campeonato Brasileiro Série A club Santos, and the Paraguay national team.

== Club career ==
=== Cerro Porteño ===
Born in Itauguá, Duarte joined Cerro Porteño's youth sides in 2013, for the under-14 team. He made his first team debut on 3 October 2018, starting in a 4–2 away win over 2 de Mayo for the Copa Paraguay.

After featuring in a further two cup matches, Duarte made his Primera División debut on 29 April 2019, starting in a 3–0 win over Nacional Asunción. He only became a regular starter in the 2020 season, and scored his first goal on 26 September of that year, netting Cerro's third in a 3–1 home success over River Plate Asunción, in a match that ensured the club's 2020 Apertura title.

In January 2021, Duarte agreed a move to Liga MX side Club Necaxa but the move fell through due to injury; he also received an offer from a Major League Soccer side in the summer, but it was refused by Cerro. He became team captain ahead of the 2022 Clausura tournament, and renewed his contract until 2026 on 1 September of that year.

=== Spartak Moscow ===
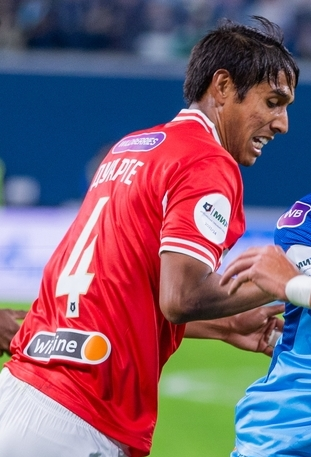
Duarte in action for Spartak Moscow in 2024

On 11 January 2023, Cerro announced that the club had reached an agreement for the transfer of Duarte to Russian Premier League side Spartak Moscow. Spartak confirmed the transfer thirteen days later, with the player signing a four-and-a-half-year deal for a rumoured fee of US$5 million.

Duarte made his debut abroad on 4 March 2023, starting in a 2–2 home draw against Ural Yekaterinburg. He became a regular starter in the 2023–24 season, featuring in 33 matches.

=== Santos ===
On 2 September 2025, Campeonato Brasileiro Série A club Santos announced the signing of Duarte on a four-year contract. He made his club debut on 28 September, starting in a 2–2 away draw against Red Bull Bragantino.

Duarte featured in a further four matches in the year, but started the 2026 campaign as a fifth-choice behind Adonis Frías, Zé Ivaldo, Luan Peres and João Basso. He featured in one match against Chapecoense, before being deemed surplus to requirements.

==== Loan to Libertad ====
On 25 February 2026, Duarte returned to his home country after agreeing to a loan deal with Libertad until the end of the year. In March, he suffered a knee injury which sidelined him for the remainder of the season, also ruling him out of the 2026 FIFA World Cup.

== International career ==
Having represented his country in the 2017 FIFA U-17 World Cup and the 2019 South American U-20 Championship, Duarte earned his first call-up to the Paraguay senior team in September 2021 for their World Cup qualifiers. He was an unused substitute in the nation's 1–0 loss to Ecuador on 2 September.

In August 2022, Duarte was called up to the national side for a friendly against Mexico, but had to withdraw due to injury. He made his full international debut on 18 November 2025, starting in a 2–1 win over the same opponent at the Alamodome in San Antonio, Texas.

== Personal life ==
Duarte's father and brother, both named Andrés, were also footballers and defenders. They also played for Cerro.

== Career statistics ==
=== Club ===
As of 22 April 2026

Appearances and goals by club, season and competition
Club	Season	League			National cup (Note: Includes Copa Paraguay, Russian Cup)		Continental		State league		Other		Total	
Club	Season	Division	Apps	Goals	Apps	Goals	Apps	Goals	Apps	Goals	Apps	Goals	Apps	Goals
Cerro Porteño	2018	Paraguayan Primera División	0	0	3	0	0	0	—		—		3	0
Cerro Porteño	2019	Paraguayan Primera División	1	0	0	0	0	0	—		—		1	0
Cerro Porteño	2020	Paraguayan Primera División	25	1	0	0	0	0	—		—		25	1
Cerro Porteño	2021	Paraguayan Primera División	28	0	0	0	8 (Note: Appearances in Copa Libertadores)	0	—		1 (Note: Appearance in Supercopa Paraguay)	0	37	0
Cerro Porteño	2022	Paraguayan Primera División	38	0	0	0	7	0	—		—		45	0
Cerro Porteño	Total		92	1	3	0	15	0	—		1	0	111	0
Spartak Moscow	2022–23	Russian Premier League	7	0	1	0	—		—		—		8	0
Spartak Moscow	2023–24	Russian Premier League	27	0	6	0	—		—		—		33	0
Spartak Moscow	2024–25	Russian Premier League	15	0	4	0	—		—		—		19	0
Spartak Moscow	2025–26	Russian Premier League	6	0	1	0	—		—		—		7	0
Spartak Moscow	Total		55	0	12	0	—		—		—		67	0
Santos	2025	Série A	5	0	—		—		—		—		5	0
Santos	2026	Série A	1	0	0	0	0	0	0	0	—		1	0
Santos	Total		6	0	0	0	0	0	0	0	—		6	0
Libertad (loan)	2026	Paraguayan Primera División	1	0	0	0	0	0	—		—		1	0
Career total			154	1	15	0	15	0	0	0	1	0	185	1

=== International ===
As of match played 18 November 2025

Appearances and goals by national team and year
National team	Year	Apps	Goals
Paraguay	2025	1	0
Total		1	0

== Honours ==
Cerro Porteño

- Paraguayan Primera División: 2020 Apertura, 2021 Clausura

Spartak Moscow

- Russian Cup: 2025–26
