= Tomás Muro =

Argentine footballer

Personal information
- Full name: Tomás Ramiro Muro
- Date of birth: 5 May 2002 (age 24)
- Place of birth: General Pinto, Argentina
- Height: 1.80 m (5 ft 11 in)
- Position: Central midfielder

Team information
- Current team: Sportivo Luqueño (on loan from Independiente Rivadavia)
- Number: 29

Youth career
- Gimnasia

Senior career*
Years	Team	Apps	(Gls)
2022–2023	Gimnasia	25	(2)
2023–2025	Orenburg	4	(0)
2025–	Independiente Rivadavia	1	(0)
2026–	→ Sportivo Luqueño (loan)	11	(1)
- * Club domestic league appearances and goals as of 17:09, 27 November 2025 (UTC)

Tomás Ramiro Muro (born 5 May 2002) is an Argentine football player who plays as a central midfielder for Sportivo Luqueño, on loan from Independiente Rivadavia.

== Career ==
On 7 June 2023, Muro signed a contract with Russian Premier League club Orenburg, joining four other Argentine players already on the squad.

Muro made his debut for Orenburg on 26 July 2023 in a Russian Cup game against CSKA Moscow. In his second Cup game against Sochi he provided an assist. Shortly thereafter he suffered an ACL tear. Muro returned to Orenburg squad in April 2024, but did not make any more appearances in the 2023–24 season. He made his league debut on 21 July 2024 against Spartak Moscow.

== Career statistics ==
As of match played 19 April 2025

Appearances and goals by club, season and competition
Club	Season	League			Cup		Continental		Other		Total	
Club	Season	Division	Apps	Goals	Apps	Goals	Apps	Goals	Apps	Goals	Apps	Goals
Gimnasia	2022	Argentine Primera División	16	2	2	0	—		7 (Note: Appearances in the Copa de la Liga Profesional. Soccerway includes them in the league totals.)	0	25	2
Gimnasia	2023	Argentine Primera División	9	0	0	0	4 (Note: Appearances in the Copa Sudamericana)	0	—		13	0
Gimnasia	Total		25	2	2	0	4	0	7	0	38	2
Orenburg	2023–24	Russian Premier League	0	0	2	0	—		—		2	0
Orenburg	2024–25	Russian Premier League	4	0	4	0	—		—		8	0
Orenburg	Total		4	0	6	0	—		—		10	0
Career total			29	2	8	0	4	0	7	0	48	2
