= Andrés Duarte =

Paraguayan footballer (born 1972)

Personal information
- Full name: Andrés Duarte Villamayor
- Date of birth: 4 February 1972 (age 54)
- Place of birth: Asunción, Paraguay
- Position: Right-back

Senior career*
Years	Team	Apps	(Gls)
1990–1993	Cerro Porteño		
1993–1995	Argentinos Juniors	25	(1)
1995–1996	Ferro Carril Oeste	10	(0)
1996–1997	Deportivo Italiano	6	(1)
1997	Cerro Corá		
1998–1999	Instituto	12	(0)
2000	River Plate Asunción		
2000–2004	Mineros		

International career
1992	Paraguay U23	4	(0)
1993	Paraguay	7	(0)
- * Club domestic league appearances and goals

Andrés Duarte Villamayor (born 4 February 1972, in Asunción) is a retired Paraguayan footballer. A defender, he was a member of the Paraguay national team, competing at the 1992 Summer Olympics in Barcelona, Spain.

== Club career ==
Duarte played for Cerro Porteño, Cerro Corá and River Plate Asunción in Paraguay and Argentinos Juniors, Ferro Carril Oeste, Sportivo Italiano and Instituto in Argentina. He retired with Venezuelan club Mineros in 2004.

== International career ==
Duarte made his international debut for the Paraguay national football team on 3 March 1993 in a friendly match against Bolivia (1–0 win). He obtained a total number of seven international caps, scoring no goals for the national side.

== Personal life ==
Duarte's sons Alexis and Andrés are also footballers and defenders.
