= Andrey Nikitin (footballer, born 2000) =

Russian footballer

Personal information
- Full name: Andrey Vadimovich Nikitin
- Date of birth: 26 October 2000 (age 26)
- Place of birth: Orel, Russia
- Height: 1.78 m (5 ft 10 in)
- Position: Left winger

Team information
- Current team: Volga Ulyanovsk
- Number: 7

Youth career
- Salyut Belgorod

Senior career*
Years	Team	Apps	(Gls)
2018–2019	Salyut Belgorod	21	(3)
2019–2020	Ryazan	13	(3)
2020	Fakel Voronezh	24	(2)
2021–2025	Lokomotiv Moscow	0	(0)
2021	→ Fakel Voronezh (loan)	11	(1)
2021	→ Kazanka Moscow	1	(0)
2021–2022	→ Fakel Voronezh (loan)	24	(1)
2022–2023	→ Ufa (loan)	28	(0)
2023–2024	→ SKA-Khabarovsk (loan)	32	(2)
2024–2025	→ Arsenal Tula (loan)	3	(0)
2025	→ Neftekhimik Nizhnekamsk (loan)	13	(0)
2025–2026	Neftekhimik Nizhnekamsk	33	(5)
2026–	Volga Ulyanovsk	0	(0)
- * Club domestic league appearances and goals as of 16 May 2026

Andrey Vadimovich Nikitin (Russian: Андрей Вадимович Никитин; born 26 October 2000) is a Russian football player who plays as a left winger for Volga Ulyanovsk.

== Club career ==
He made his debut in the Russian Football National League for Fakel Voronezh on 1 August 2020 in a game against Akron Tolyatti, as a starter.

On 11 February 2021, Lokomotiv Moscow purchased his rights and loaned him back to Fakel until the end of the 2020–21 season. On 6 September 2021, he returned to Fakel on a new loan for the 2021–22 season.

On 19 August 2022, Nikitin joined Ufa on loan with an option to buy. On 21 June 2023, Nikitin moved on a new loan to SKA-Khabarovsk. On 8 July 2024, Nikitin joined Arsenal Tula on loan. On 16 January 2025, he moved on a new loan to Neftekhimik Nizhnekamsk.

On 20 June 2025, Nikitin returned to Neftekhimik Nizhnekamsk on a permanent basis.

== Career statistics ==
As of 24 May 2025

Club	Season	League			Cup		Continental		Total	
Club	Season	Division	Apps	Goals	Apps	Goals	Apps	Goals	Apps	Goals
Salyut Belgorod	2018–19	Russian Second League	21	3	0	0	–		21	3
Ryazan	2019–20	Russian Second League	13	3	2	0	–		15	3
Fakel Voronezh	2020–21	Russian First League	24	2	1	0	–		25	2
Fakel Voronezh (loan)	2020–21	Russian First League	11	1	–		–		11	1
Kazanka Moscow	2021–22	Russian Second League	1	0	–		–		1	0
Fakel Voronezh (loan)	2021–22	Russian First League	24	1	1	0	–		25	1
Ufa (loan)	2022–23	Russian First League	28	0	4	1	–		32	1
SKA-Khabarovsk (loan)	2023–24	Russian First League	32	2	2	0	–		34	2
Arsenal Tula (loan)	2024–25	Russian First League	3	0	1	0	–		4	0
Neftekhimik Nizhnekamsk (loan)	2024–25	Russian First League	13	0	0	0	–		13	0
Career total			170	12	11	1	0	0	181	13
