= Anton Roshchin =

Russian footballer (born 2005)

Personal information
- Full name: Anton Vladimirovich Roshchin
- Date of birth: 24 March 2005 (age 21)
- Place of birth: Astrakhan, Russia
- Height: 1.81 m (5 ft 11 in)
- Position: Right midfielder

Team information
- Current team: Tyumen (on loan from KAMAZ Naberezhnye Chelny)
- Number: 7

Youth career
- Volgar Astrakhan
- UOR-5 Yegoryevsk
- Spartak Moscow

Senior career*
Years	Team	Apps	(Gls)
2023–2026	Spartak Moscow	1	(0)
2024–2025	→ Metallurg Lipetsk (loan)	29	(8)
2025–2026	→ Leningradets (loan)	11	(1)
2026–	KAMAZ Naberezhnye Chelny	11	(0)
2026–	→ Tyumen (loan)	7	(4)
- * Club domestic league appearances and goals as of 17 October 2026

Anton Vladimirovich Roshchin (Russian: Антон Владимирович Рощин; born 24 March 2005) is a Russian football player who plays as a right midfielder for Tyumen on loan from KAMAZ Naberezhnye Chelny.

== Career ==
Roshchin made his debut in the Russian Premier League for Spartak Moscow on 21 April 2024 in a game against Rostov.

On 18 February 2026, Roshchin signed with KAMAZ Naberezhnye Chelny.

== Career statistics ==
As of 16 May 2026

Club	Season	League			Cup		Total	
Club	Season	Division	Apps	Goals	Apps	Goals	Apps	Goals
Spartak Moscow	2023–24	Russian Premier League	1	0	0	0	1	0
Metallurg Lipetsk (loan)	2024–25	Russian Second League A	15	5	1	0	16	5
Metallurg Lipetsk (loan)	2025	Russian Second League B	14	3	0	0	14	3
Metallurg Lipetsk (loan)	Total		29	8	1	0	30	8
Leningradets (loan)	2025–26	Russian Second League A	11	1	0	0	11	1
KAMAZ	2025–26	Russian First League	9	0	—		9	0
Career total			50	9	1	0	!51	9
