= Islam-Bek Gubzhokov =

Russian footballer (born 2002)

Personal information
- Full name: Islam-Bek Khadisovich Gubzhokov
- Date of birth: 25 January 2002 (age 24)
- Place of birth: Nalchik, Russia
- Height: 1.72 m (5 ft 8 in)
- Position: Midfielder

Team information
- Current team: Spartak Nalchik
- Number: 70

Youth career
- –2018: Krasnodar

Senior career*
Years	Team	Apps	(Gls)
2019–2024	Krasnodar	0	(0)
2019	→ Krasnodar-3	3	(2)
2022–2024	→ Krasnodar-2	47	(3)
2025–2026	Dynamo Vologda	31	(2)
2026–	Spartak Nalchik	6	(2)

International career
2019	Russia U-17	8	(1)
2019	Russia U-18	3	(0)
- * Club domestic league appearances and goals as of 31 October 2026

Islam-Bek Khadisovich Gubzhokov (Russian: Ислам-Бек Хадисович Губжоков; born 25 January 2002) is a Russian footballer who plays as a midfielder for Spartak Nalchik.

== Club career ==
He made his debut in the Russian Second League for Krasnodar-3 on 21 April 2019 in a game against Druzhba Maikop.

He made his debut in the Russian First League for Krasnodar-2 on 10 April 2022 in a game against Rotor Volgograd.
