= Sultan Dzhamilov =

Russian footballer

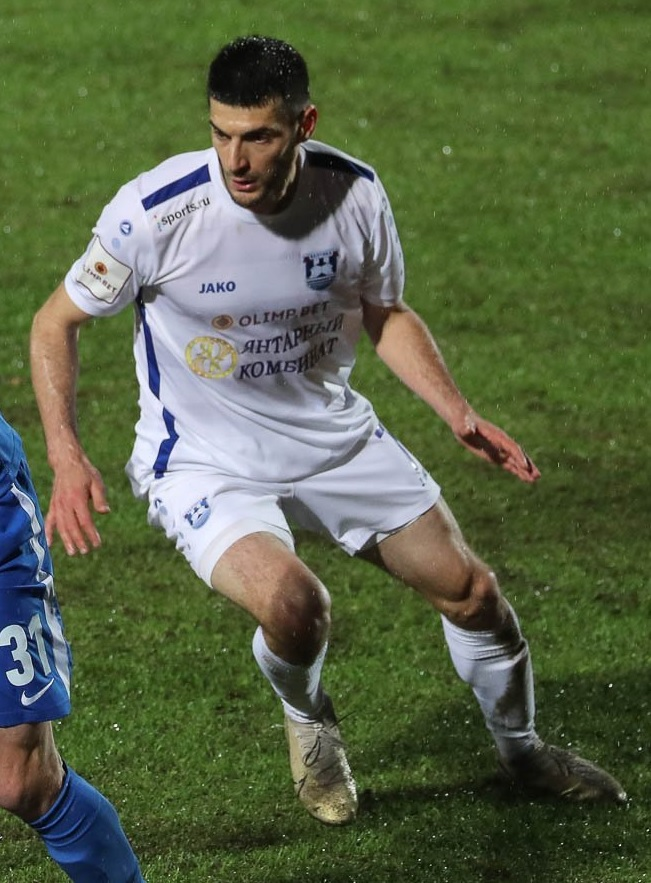
- Dzhamilov with Baltika in 2021

Personal information
- Full name: Sultan Gasanovich Dzhamilov
- Date of birth: 18 July 1995 (age 31)
- Place of birth: Moscow, Russia
- Height: 1.75 m (5 ft 9 in)
- Position: Midfielder

Team information
- Current team: FC Neftekhimik Nizhnekamsk
- Number: 7

Youth career
- SDYuSShOR-27 Sokol Moscow
- –2014: FC Spartak Moscow

Senior career*
Years	Team	Apps	(Gls)
2014–2015	LFK Lokomotiv Moscow		
2015	FC Znamya Truda Orekhovo-Zuyevo	10	(1)
2015–2016	FC Druzhba Maykop	30	(2)
2016–2017	FC Metallurg Moscow		
2017	FShM Moscow (amateur)		
2019–2020	FC Rodina Moscow	17	(5)
2020–2022	FC Baltika Kaliningrad	42	(1)
2022	FC Baltika-BFU Kaliningrad	9	(1)
2023–	FC Neftekhimik Nizhnekamsk	76	(7)
- * Club domestic league appearances and goals as of 16 May 2026

Sultan Gasanovich Dzhamilov (Russian: Султан Гасанович Джамилов; born 18 July 1995) is a Russian football player who plays for FC Neftekhimik Nizhnekamsk.

== Club career ==
He made his debut in the Russian Football National League for FC Baltika Kaliningrad on 4 October 2020 in a game against FC Yenisey Krasnoyarsk.
