= Yefim Burkin =

Russian footballer (born 2008)

Personal information
- Full name: Yefim Olegovich Burkin
- Date of birth: 15 April 2008 (age 18)
- Height: 1.72 m (5 ft 8 in)
- Position: Attacking midfielder

Team information
- Current team: Krasnodar
- Number: 27

Youth career
- Krasnodar

Senior career*
| Years | Team | Apps | (Gls) |
| 2026– | Krasnodar | 2 | (0) |

International career^{‡}
| 2023 | Russia U15 | 4 | (0) |
| 2023–2024 | Russia U16 | 5 | (1) |
| 2024 | Russia U17 | 5 | (0) |
| 2025 | Russia U18 | 2 | (0) |
| 2026– | Russia U19 | 4 | (1) |
- * Club domestic league appearances and goals as of 31 October 2026 ‡ National team caps and goals as of 6 October 2026

Yefim Olegovich Burkin (Russian: Ефим Олегович Буркин; born 15 April 2008) is a Russian football player who plays as an attacking midfielder for Krasnodar.

== Career ==
Burkin made his senior debut for Krasnodar on 17 March 2026 in a Russian Cup game against CSKA Moscow. He made his Russian Premier League debut four days later in a game against Pari Nizhny Novgorod.

== Career statistics ==
As of 31 October 2026

| Club | Season | League | | | Cup | | Total | |
| Club | Season | Division | Apps | Goals | Apps | Goals | Apps | Goals |
|---|---|---|---|---|---|---|---|---|
| Krasnodar | 2025–26 | Russian Premier League | 1 | 0 | 1 | 0 | 2 | 0 |
| Krasnodar | 2026–27 | Russian Premier League | 1 | 0 | 2 | 0 | 3 | 0 |
| Krasnodar | Total | | 2 | 0 | 3 | 0 | 5 | 0 |
| Career total | | | 2 | 0 | 3 | 0 | 5 | 0 |
