= Eldar Guseynov =

Russian footballer (born 2008)

Personal information
- Full name: Eldar Agasafovich Guseynov
- Date of birth: 9 February 2008 (age 18)
- Place of birth: Syzran, Russia
- Height: 1.70 m (5 ft 7 in)
- Position: Left winger

Team information
- Current team: Krasnodar
- Number: 29

Youth career
- Krasnodar

Senior career*
Years	Team	Apps	(Gls)
2025–	Krasnodar	2	(0)

International career^{‡}
2024–2025	Russia U17	7	(1)
- * Club domestic league appearances and goals as of 21 March 2026 ‡ National team caps and goals as of 21 March 2025

Eldar Agasafovich Guseynov (Russian: Эльдар Агасафович Гусейнов; born 9 February 2008) is a Russian football player who plays as a left winger for Krasnodar.

== Career ==
Guseynov made his debut in the Russian Premier League for Krasnodar on 8 March 2026 in a game against Rubin Kazan.

== Career statistics ==
As of 8 April 2026

Club	Season	League			Cup		Total	
Club	Season	Division	Apps	Goals	Apps	Goals	Apps	Goals
Krasnodar	2025–26	Russian Premier League	2	0	2	0	4	0
Career total			2	0	2	0	4	0
