= Ignat Terekhovsky =

Russian footballer (born 2006

Personal information
- Full name: Ignat Konstantinovich Terekhovsky
- Date of birth: 27 March 2006 (age 20)
- Place of birth: Tolyatti, Russia
- Height: 1.92 m (6 ft 4 in)
- Position: Goalkeeper

Team information
- Current team: Akron Tolyatti
- Number: 32

Youth career
- –2020: Konoplyov football academy
- 2020–2025: Krasnodar

Senior career*
Years	Team	Apps	(Gls)
2025–	Akron Tolyatti	3	(0)
2025	Akron-2 Tolyatti	7	(0)
- * Club domestic league appearances and goals as of 4 April 2026

Ignat Konstantinovich Terekhovsky (Russian: Игнат Константинович Тереховский; born 27 March 2006) is a Russian football player who plays as a goalkeeper for Akron Tolyatti.

== Career ==
Terekhovsky made his senior debut for Akron Tolyatti on 29 July 2025 in a Russian Cup game against Baltika Kaliningrad. He made his Russian Premier League debut for Akron on 15 March 2026 in a game against Akhmat Grozny.

== Career statistics ==
As of 28 October 2026

Club	Season	League			Cup		Other		Total	
Club	Season	Division	Apps	Goals	Apps	Goals	Apps	Goals	Apps	Goals
Akron Tolyatti	2024–25	Russian Premier League	0	0	0	0	—		0	0
Akron Tolyatti	2025–26	Russian Premier League	3	0	3	0	2 (Note: Appearances in relegation play-offs)	0	8	0
Akron Tolyatti	2026–27	Russian Premier League	0	0	5	0	—		5	0
Akron Tolyatti	Total		3	0	8	0	2	0	13	0
Akron-2 Tolyatti	2025	Russian Second League B	7	0	—		—		7	0
Career total			10	0	8	0	2	0	20	0
