= Konstantin Shiltsov =

Russian footballer

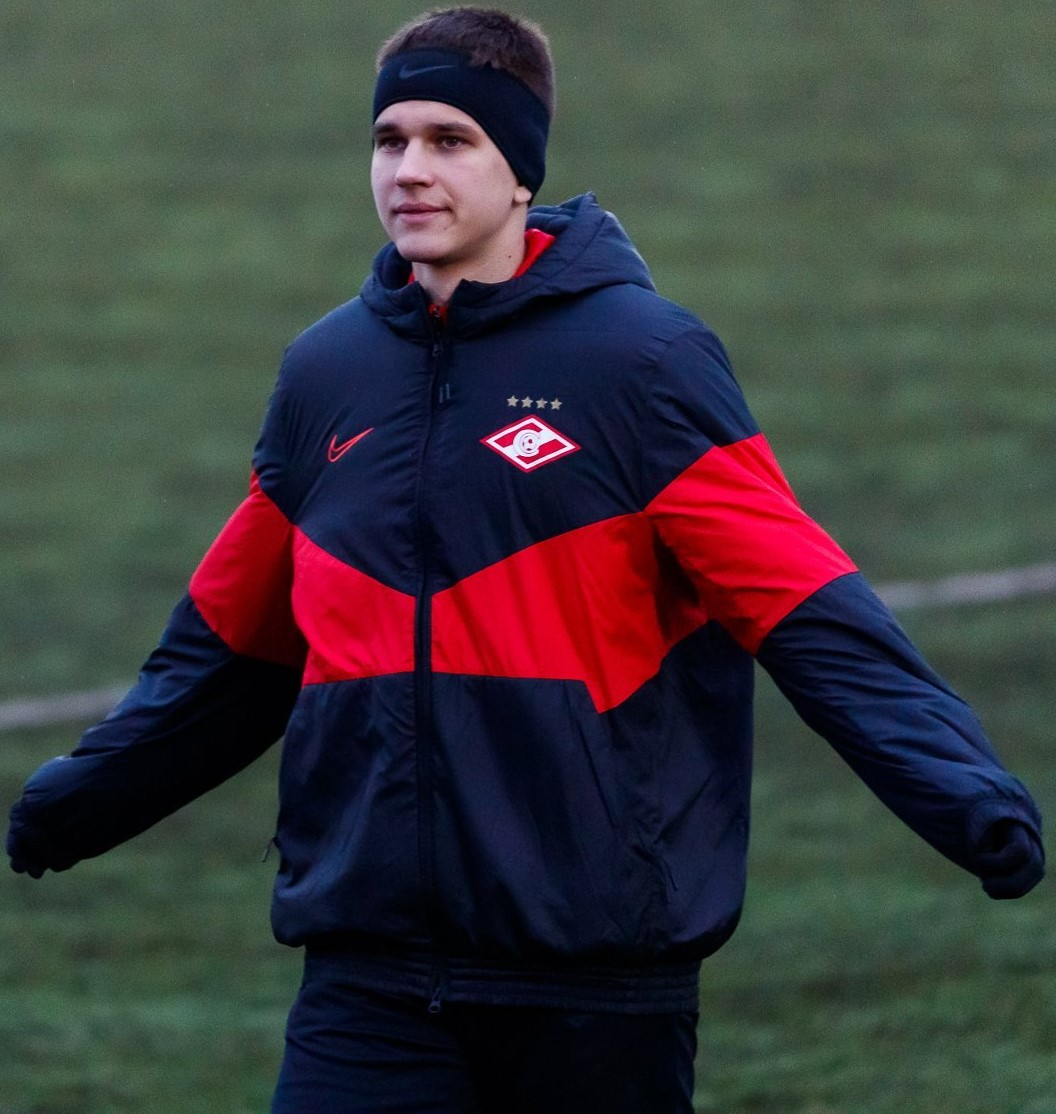

Personal information
- Full name: Konstantin Sergeyevich Shiltsov
- Date of birth: 7 May 2002 (age 24)
- Place of birth: Yelets, Russia
- Height: 1.86 m (6 ft 1 in)
- Position: Midfielder

Team information
- Current team: Baltika Kaliningrad
- Number: 7

Youth career
- 2010–2017: Yelets
- 2017–2019: Master-Saturn
- 2019: Spartak Moscow

Senior career*
Years	Team	Apps	(Gls)
2020–2024	Spartak Moscow	0	(0)
2020–2022	→ Spartak-2 Moscow	41	(10)
2022–2023	→ Pari NN (loan)	10	(0)
2023–2024	→ Rodina Moscow (loan)	6	(0)
2024	→ Neftekhimik Nizhnekamsk (loan)	12	(0)
2024–2026	Neftekhimik Nizhnekamsk	65	(7)
2026–	Baltika Kaliningrad	11	(0)

International career^{‡}
2019	Russia U-18	5	(0)
2022	Russia U-21	3	(0)
- * Club domestic league appearances and goals as of 21 November 2026 ‡ National team caps and goals as of 16 November 2022

Konstantin Sergeyevich Shiltsov (Russian: Константин Сергеевич Шильцов; born 7 May 2002) is a Russian football player who plays for Baltika Kaliningrad.

== Club career ==
He made his debut for the main squad of Spartak Moscow on 21 October 2020 in a Russian Cup game against Yenisey Krasnoyarsk.

He made his Russian Football National League debut for Spartak-2 Moscow on 21 November 2020 in a game against Tom Tomsk.

On 1 July 2022, Shiltsov joined Pari NN on loan. He made his Russian Premier League debut for Pari NN on 17 July 2022 against Lokomotiv Moscow.

On 23 August 2023, Shiltsov moved on a new loan to Rodina Moscow, with an option to buy.

On 16 February 2024, Shiltsov was loaned by Neftekhimik Nizhnekamsk. He returned to Neftekhimik for the 2024–25 season.

On 11 February 2026, Shiltsov signed a four-year contract with Baltika Kaliningrad, beginning on 1 July 2026. He finished the 2025–26 season with Neftekhimik.

== Career statistics ==
As of 21 November 2026

Club	Season	League			Cup		Total	
Club	Season	Division	Apps	Goals	Apps	Goals	Apps	Goals
Spartak Moscow	2019–20	Russian Premier League	0	0	0	0	0	0
Spartak Moscow	2020–21	Russian Premier League	0	0	1	0	1	0
Spartak Moscow	Total		0	0	1	0	1	0
Spartak-2 Moscow	2020–21	Russian First League	10	0	–		10	0
Spartak-2 Moscow	2021–22	Russian First League	31	10	–		31	10
Spartak-2 Moscow	Total		41	10	0	0	41	10
Pari NN (loan)	2022–23	Russian Premier League	10	0	5	1	15	1
Rodina Moscow (loan)	2023–24	Russian First League	6	0	2	0	8	0
Neftekhimik Nizhnekamsk (loan)	2023–24	Russian First League	12	0	–		12	0
Neftekhimik Nizhnekamsk	2024–25	Russian First League	32	3	1	0	33	3
Neftekhimik Nizhnekamsk	2025–26	Russian First League	33	4	2	0	35	4
Neftekhimik Nizhnekamsk	Total		65	7	3	0	68	7
Baltika Kaliningrad	2026–27	Russian Premier League	11	0	4	0	15	0
Career total			145	17	15	1	160	18
