= Maksim Laykin =

Russian footballer (born 2003)

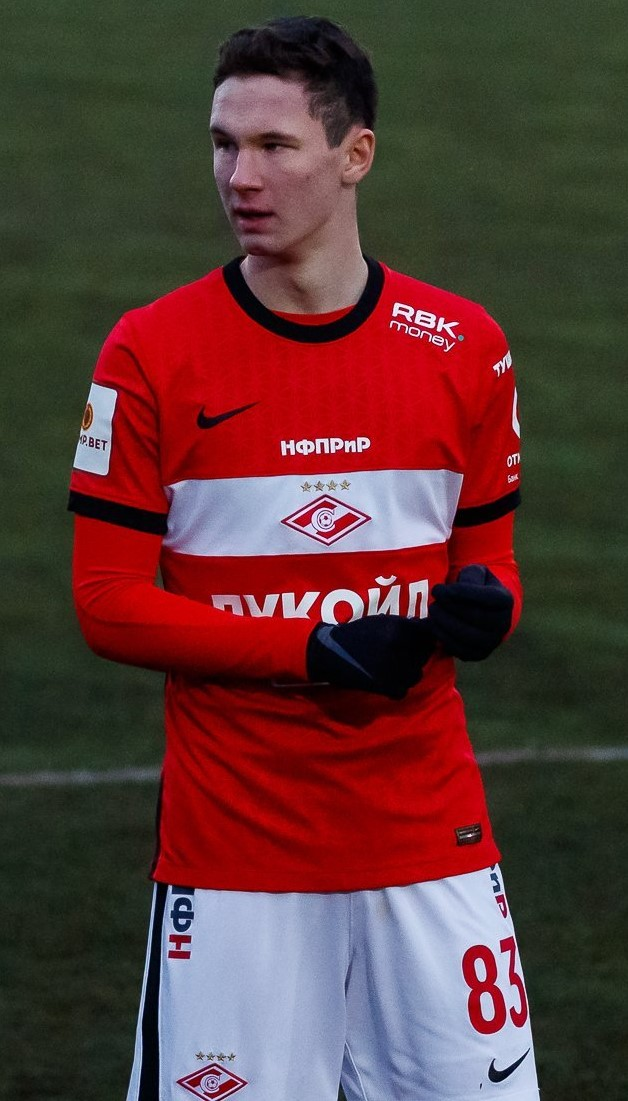

Personal information
- Full name: Maksim Igorevich Laykin
- Date of birth: 31 May 2003 (age 23)
- Place of birth: Saransk, Russia
- Height: 1.79 m (5 ft 10 1/2 in)
- Positions: Attacking midfielder; defensive midfielder

Team information
- Current team: KAMAZ Naberezhnye Chelny
- Number: 83

Youth career
- Mordovia Saransk
- Spartak Moscow

Senior career*
Years	Team	Apps	(Gls)
2020–2022	Spartak-2 Moscow	36	(0)
2022–2026	Spartak Moscow	2	(0)
2022–2023	→ Neftekhimik Nizhnekamsk (loan)	31	(4)
2024	→ Arsenal Tula (loan)	6	(0)
2024	→ Yenisey Krasnoyarsk (loan)	12	(0)
2025	→ Neftekhimik Nizhnekamsk (loan)	11	(0)
2026–	KAMAZ Naberezhnye Chelny	12	(0)

International career^{‡}
2018	Russia U-15	2	(0)
2018–2019	Russia U-16	8	(2)
2019–2020	Russia U-17	7	(0)
2021	Russia U-18	5	(3)
2021	Russia U-19	8	(5)
- * Club domestic league appearances and goals as of 16 May 2026 ‡ National team caps and goals as of 13 November 2021

Maksim Igorevich Laykin (Russian: Максим Игоревич Лайкин; born 31 May 2003) is a Russian football player who plays as an attacking midfielder or a defensive midfielder for KAMAZ Naberezhnye Chelny.

== Club career ==
He made his debut in the Russian Football National League for Spartak-2 Moscow on 22 August 2020 in a game against Irtysh Omsk.

On 17 June 2022, Laykin joined Neftekhimik Nizhnekamsk.

Laykin made his Russian Premier League debut for Spartak on 25 November 2023 against Baltika Kaliningrad. He made his first start for Spartak on 29 November 2023 in a Russian Cup game against Orenburg.

On 14 February 2024, Laykin moved on loan to Arsenal Tula. On 10 July 2024, he was loaned to Yenisey Krasnoyarsk. On 16 January 2025, he returned to Neftekhimik Nizhnekamsk on a new loan.

On 18 February 2026, Laykin joined Russian First League club KAMAZ Naberezhnye Chelny, Spartak retained a buy-back option.

== Career statistics ==
As of match played 24 May 2025

Appearances and goals by club, season and competition
Club	Season	League			Cup		Other		Total	
Club	Season	Division	Apps	Goals	Apps	Goals	Apps	Goals	Apps	Goals
Spartak-2 Moscow	2020–21	Russian First League	15	0	–		–		15	0
Spartak-2 Moscow	2021–22	Russian First League	21	0	–		–		21	0
Spartak-2 Moscow	Total		36	0	–		–		36	0
Neftekhimik Nizhnekamsk (loan)	2022–23	Russian First League	31	4	2	0	–		33	4
Spartak Moscow	2023–24	Russian Premier League	2	0	1	0	–		3	0
Arsenal Tula (loan)	2023–24	Russian First League	6	0	0	0	1 (Note: Appearance in promotion play-offs)	0	7	0
Yenisey Krasnoyarsk (loan)	2024–25	Russian First League	12	0	0	0	–		12	0
Neftekhimik Nizhnekamsk (loan)	2024–25	Russian First League	11	0	0	0	–		11	0
KAMAZ	2025–26	Russian First League	12	0	–		–		12	0
Career total			110	4	3	0	1	0	114	4
