= 2024–25 FC Neftekhimik Nizhnekamsk season =

FC Neftekhimik Nizhnekamsk
2024–25 season
- Stadium: Neftekhimik Stadium
- Russian First League: 3rd
- Russian Cup: Pre-season
- Top goalscorer: League: Said Aliyev (2); All: Said Aliyev (2)
- Highest home attendance: 1,872 vs Rotor Volgograd
- Lowest home attendance: 1,141 vs Tyumen

The 2024–25 season is the 34th season in the history of FC Neftekhimik Nizhnekamsk, and the club's sixth consecutive season in the Russian First League. In addition to the domestic league, the team is scheduled to participate in the Russian Cup.

== Competitions ==
=== Overall record ===
Competition	First match	Last match	Starting round	Record							
Competition	First match	Last match	Starting round	Pld	W	D	L	GF	GA	GD	Win %
Russian First League	14 July 2024		Matchday 1	5	3	1	1	7	6	+1	60.00
Russian Cup				0	0	0	0	0	0	+0	—
Total				5	3	1	1	7	6	+1	60.00

Last updated: 11 August 2024
Source: Soccerway

=== Russian First League ===
==== League table ====
Pos	Team	Pld	W	D	L	GF	GA	GD	Pts
10	Arsenal Tula	34	8	17	9	25	30	−5	41
11	KAMAZ Naberezhnye Chelny	34	10	8	16	31	35	−4	38 (Note: Ranked on head-to-head points (KAMAZ 6, Neftekhimik 5, Chayka 4))
12	Neftekhimik Nizhnekamsk	34	9	11	14	31	37	−6	38
13	Chayka Peschanokopskoye	34	8	14	12	31	43	−12	38
14	Shinnik Yaroslavl	34	8	11	15	24	42	−18	35 (Note: Ranked on head-to-head goal difference (Shinnik +1, Ufa –1))

Source: Soccerway
Rules for classification: 1) Points; 2) Head-to-head points; 3) Head-to-head matches won; 4) Head-to-head goal difference; 5) Head-to-head goals scored; 6) Head-to-head away goals scored; 7) Matches won; 8) Goal difference; 9) Goals scored; 10) Away matches won; 11) Away goals scored; 12) Best disciplinary record (3 points for red card, 1 point for yellow card); 13) Drawing lots. If teams tied on points did not play an equal number of head-to-head games, head-to-head criteria and disciplinary record are not used for positioning. If 1st- and 2nd-placed teams are tied in the final standings on the first 12 criteria, a winner is determined in an additional play-off game, with no extra time and a penalty-shootout if tied at the end of regulation, instead of drawing lots.

==== Results summary ====
Overall								Home						Away					
Pld	W	D	L	GF	GA	GD	Pts	W	D	L	GF	GA	GD	W	D	L	GF	GA	GD
5	3	1	1	7	6	+1	10	3	0	0	6	1	+5	0	1	1	1	5	−4

Last updated: 11 August 2024.

==== Results by round ====
Round	1	2	3	4	5
Ground	H	H	A	H	A
Result	W	W	L	W	D
Position	2	1			

Updated to match(es) played on 11 August 2024. Source:
A = Away; H = Home; W = Win; D = Draw; L = Loss

==== Matches ====
The tentative match schedule was released on 27 June.

14 July 2024 1	Neftekhimik Nizhnekamsk	3–0	Tyumen	Nizhnekamsk
18:00 UTC+3	Aliyev 23'; Petrov 36'; Dzhamilov 60'			Stadium: Neftekhimik Stadium; Attendance: 1,141; Referee: Oleg Sokolov

21 July 2024 2	Neftekhimik Nizhnekamsk	2–1	Ufa	Nizhnekamsk
18:00 UTC+3	Aliyev 79'; Shorkin 88'		Pasevich 10'; Kutin (red card) 59'	Stadium: Neftekhimik Stadium; Attendance: 1,451; Referee: Anton Anopa

28 July 2024 3	Chayka Peschanokopskoye	4–0	Neftekhimik Nizhnekamsk	Peschanokopskoye
19:30 UTC+3	Bammatgereev 29'; Biblyk 41'; Yanov 62'; Rudenko 82'			Stadium: Chayka Central Stadium; Attendance: 1,478; Referee: Vladislav Tselovalnikov

4 August 2024 4	Neftekhimik Nizhnekamsk	1–0	Rotor Volgograd	Nizhnekamsk
18:00 UTC+3	Dzhamilov 3'			Stadium: Neftekhimik Stadium; Attendance: 1,872; Referee: Vera Opeykina

11 August 2024 5	Arsenal Tula	1–1	Neftekhimik Nizhnekamsk	Tula
19:00 UTC+3	Tkachyov 86'		Shiltsov 33'	Stadium: Arsenal Stadium; Attendance: 4,111; Referee: Inal Tanashev
