= Matías Pérez (footballer, born 1999) =

Argentine footballer

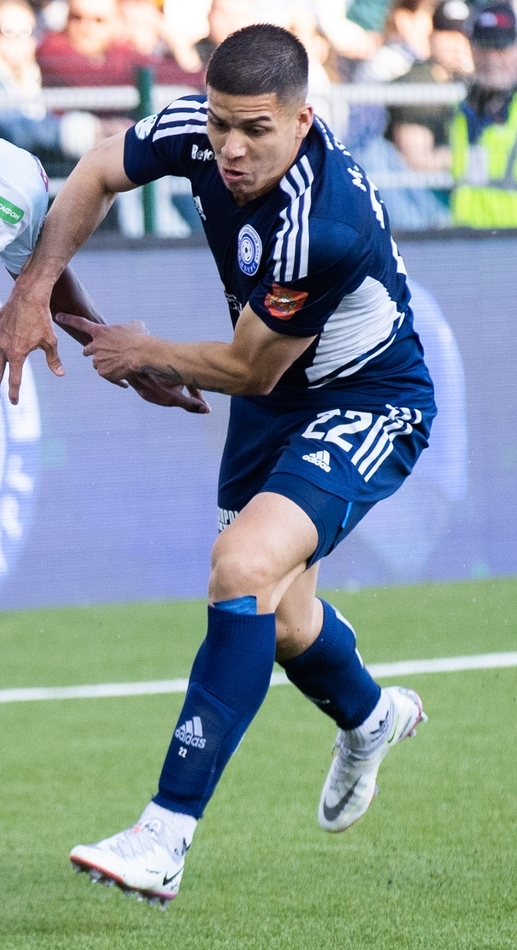

Personal information
- Full name: Matías Damián Pérez
- Date of birth: 3 March 1999 (age 27)
- Place of birth: Florencio Varela, Argentina
- Height: 1.85 m (6 ft 1 in)
- Position: Centre-back

Team information
- Current team: Racing Club
- Number: 2

Youth career
- Florencio Varela
- 11 de Agosto
- 2007–2020: Lanús

Senior career*
Years	Team	Apps	(Gls)
2020–2022	Lanús	58	(3)
2022–2025	Orenburg	53	(9)
2025–2026	Cerro Porteño	58	(1)
2026–	Racing Club	5	(0)
- * Club domestic league appearances and goals as of 18:00, 8 November 2026 (UTC)

Matías Damián Pérez (born 3 March 1999) is an Argentine professional footballer who plays as a centre-back for Racing Club.

== Professional career ==
A youth product of his local clubs Florencio Varela and 11 de Agosto, Pérez moved to the youth academy of Lanús at the age of 8. He made his professional debut for Lanús in a 2-0 Argentine Primera División win over Godoy Cruz on 2 February 2020. On 4 March 2022, he extended his professional contract with the club until 2026. He ended a 13-game winless streak for Lanús over Arsenal de Sarandí in August 2022, scoring the only goal in a 1–0 win.

On 21 December 2022, Pérez joined Russian Premier League club Orenburg.

On 15 January 2025, he moved to Cerro Porteño in Paraguay.

== Career statistics ==
As of match played 30 November 2024

Appearances and goals by club, season and competition
Club	Season	League			National Cup (Note: Includes Copa Argentina, Russian Cup)		Continental		Other		Total	
Club	Season	Division	Apps	Goals	Apps	Goals	Apps	Goals	Apps	Goals	Apps	Goals
Lanús	2019–20	Argentine Primera División	1	0	0	0	6 (Note: Appearances in Copa Sudamericana)	0	5	0	12	0
Lanús	2020–21	Argentine Primera División	5	0	1	0	7	0	0	0	13	0
Lanús	2021	Argentine Primera División	16	0	0	0	0	0	0	0	16	0
Lanús	2022	Argentine Primera División	36	3	2	0	8	0	0	0	46	3
Lanús	Total		58	3	3	0	21	0	5	0	87	3
Orenburg	2022–23	Russian Premier League	10	0	0	0	—		—		10	0
Orenburg	2023–24	Russian Premier League	27	7	3	0	—		—		30	7
Orenburg	2024–25	Russian Premier League	16	2	1	0	—		—		17	2
Orenburg	Total		53	9	4	0	—		—		57	9
Career total			111	12	7	0	21	0	5	0	139	12

== Honours ==
Individual

- Russian Premier League goal of the month: March 2024 (March 2 against CSKA Moscow).
