= Danil Kapustyansky =

Russian footballer

Personal information
- Full name: Danil Yevgeniyevich Kapustyansky
- Date of birth: 30 October 2004 (age 22)
- Place of birth: Orenburg, Russia
- Height: 1.76 m (5 ft 9 in)
- Position: Winger

Team information
- Current team: Orenburg-2
- Number: 70

Youth career
- Orenburg

Senior career*
Years	Team	Apps	(Gls)
2023–2025	Orenburg	6	(1)
2023–2026	Orenburg-2	45	(3)
2023–2024	→ Yenisey Krasnoyarsk (loan)	3	(0)
2024	→ Ufa (loan)	3	(0)
2024	→ Amkar Perm (loan)	4	(0)
- * Club domestic league appearances and goals as of 2 August 2026

Danil Yevgeniyevich Kapustyansky (Russian: Данил Евгениевич Капустянский; born 30 October 2004) is a Russian football player who plays as an attacking midfielder or winger.

== Career ==
Kapustyansky made his debut in the Russian Premier League for Orenburg on 10 March 2023 in a game against Sochi.

On 22 February 2024, Kapustyansky was loaned by Ufa. On 25 July 2024, he moved on a new loan to Amkar Perm.

== Career statistics ==
As of 22 October 2025

Club	Season	League			Cup		Total	
Club	Season	Division	Apps	Goals	Apps	Goals	Apps	Goals
Orenburg	2022–23	Russian Premier League	6	1	–		6	1
Orenburg	2023–24	Russian Premier League	0	0	0	0	0	0
Orenburg	2025–26	Russian Premier League	0	0	1	0	1	0
Orenburg	Total		6	1	1	0	7	1
Orenburg-2	2022–23	Russian Second League	3	0	–		3	0
Orenburg-2	2023	Russian Second League B	8	1	–		8	1
Orenburg-2	2025	Russian Second League B	19	2	–		19	2
Orenburg-2	Total		30	3	0	0	30	3
Yenisey Krasnoyarsk (loan)	2023–24	Russian First League	3	0	2	0	5	0
Ufa (loan)	2023–24	Russian Second League A	3	0	–		3	0
Amkar Perm (loan)	2024	Russian Second League B	4	0	1	0	5	0
Career total			46	4	4	0	50	4
