= Yaroslav Krashevsky =

Russian football player (born 2004)

Personal information
- Full name: Yaroslav Stanislavovich Krashevsky
- Date of birth: 16 March 2004 (age 22)
- Place of birth: Moscow, Russia
- Height: 1.80 m (5 ft 11 in)
- Position: Left-back

Team information
- Current team: Arsenal Tula (on loan from Pari Nizhny Novgorod)
- Number: 5

Youth career
- –2015: Yunyi Dinamovets Moscow
- 2016–2023: Spartak Moscow

Senior career*
Years	Team	Apps	(Gls)
2023–2024	Spartak Moscow	0	(0)
2023	→ Yenisey Krasnoyarsk (loan)	7	(0)
2024	→ Rotor Volgograd (loan)	15	(0)
2024	Khimik Dzerzhinsk	14	(0)
2025–	Pari Nizhny Novgorod	10	(0)
2026–	→ Arsenal Tula (loan)	0	(0)

International career^{‡}
2019–2020	Russia U-16	7	(1)
2021	Russia U-18	7	(0)
2023	Russia U-21	2	(0)
- * Club domestic league appearances and goals as of 8 November 2025 ‡ National team caps and goals as of 15 November 2023

Yaroslav Stanislavovich Krashevsky (Russian: Ярослав Станиславович Крашевский; born 16 March 2004) is a Russian football player who plays as a left-back for Arsenal Tula on loan from Pari Nizhny Novgorod.

== Career ==
On 10 January 2025, Krashevsky signed a three-and-a-half-year contract with Russian Premier League club Pari Nizhny Novgorod. He made his RPL debut for Pari Nizhny Novgorod on 12 April 2025 in a game against Dynamo Moscow.

== Career statistics ==
As of 8 November 2025

Club	Season	League			Cup		Other		Total	
Club	Season	Division	Apps	Goals	Apps	Goals	Apps	Goals	Apps	Goals
Yenisey Krasnoyarsk (loan)	2023–24	Russian First League	7	0	1	0	–		8	0
Rotor Volgograd (loan)	2023–24	Russian Second League Division A	15	0	–		1 (Note: Appearances in the promotion play-offs)	0	16	0
Khimik Dzerzhinsk	2024–25	Russian Second League Division A	14	0	2	0	–		16	0
Pari Nizhny Novgorod	2024–25	Russian Premier League	4	0	–		2 (Note: Appearances in the relegation play-offs)	0	6	0
Pari Nizhny Novgorod	2025–26	Russian Premier League	6	0	5	0	–		11	0
Pari Nizhny Novgorod	Ttotal		10	0	5	0	2	0	17	0
Career total			46	0	8	0	3	0	57	0
