= 2022 Russian Cup final =

Финал Кубка России 2022
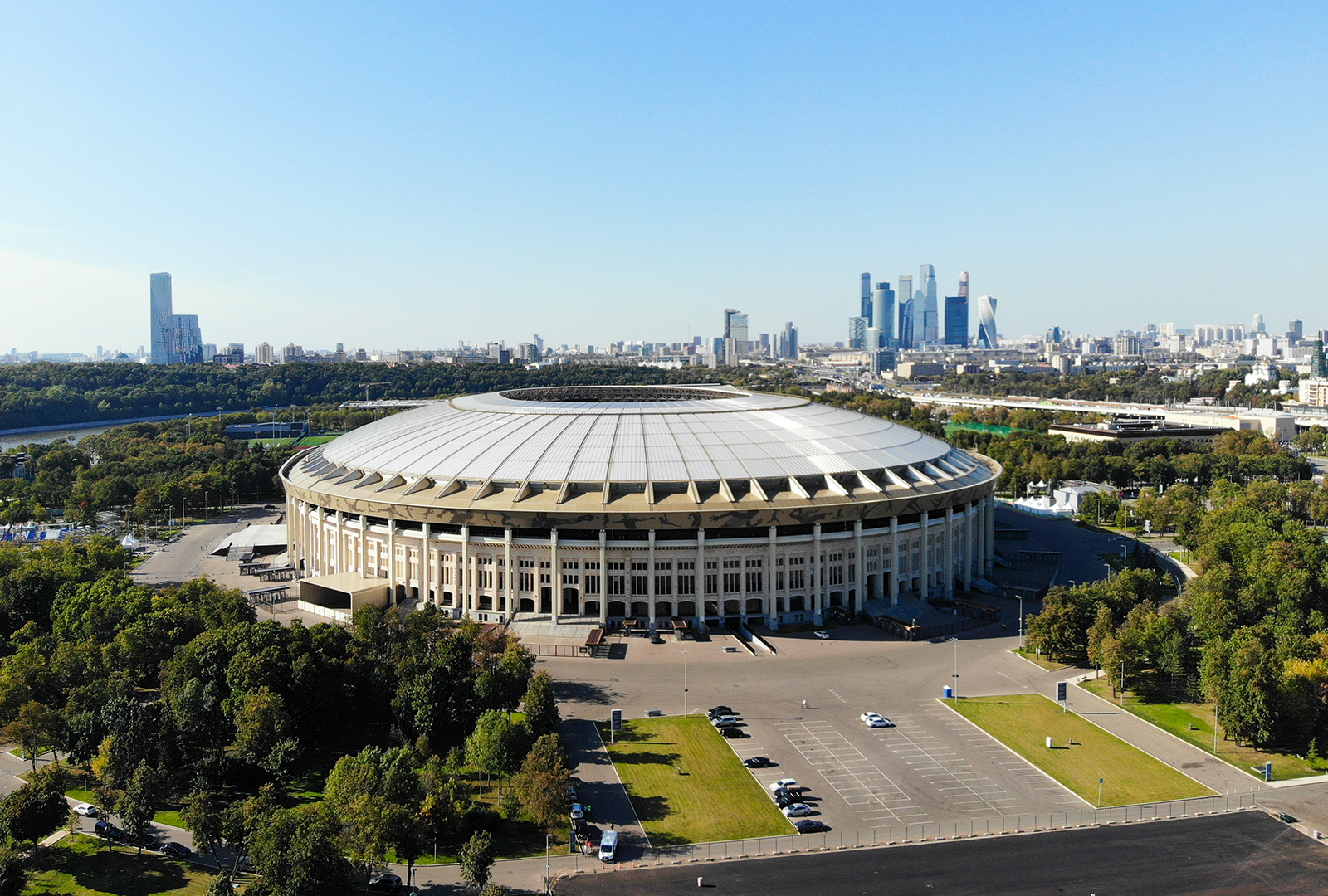
- view of Luzhniki Stadium
- Event: 2021–22 Russian Cup
Spartak Moscow	Dynamo Moscow
2	1
- Date: 29 May 2022
- Venue: Luzhniki Stadium, Moscow
- Referee: Kirill Levnikov
- Attendance: 69,306
- Weather: sun

The 2022 Russian Cup final was the 30th Russian Cup Final, the final match of the 2021–22 Russian Cup. It was played at Luzhniki Stadium in Moscow, Russia, on 29 May 2022, contested by Spartak Moscow and Dynamo Moscow.

It was the first Russian Cup Final at Luzhniki Stadium since 2007 and in Moscow since 2008.

== Pre-game ==
2022 Russian Cup Final was a single football match of Oldest Russian derby. The teams faced each other in the Russian Cup final for the first time. In the finals of Soviet Cup the teams played each other in 1950, Spartak Moscow won 3–0.

== Match ==
The score was opened early by Aleksandr Sobolev. Arsen Zakharyan equalized in the second half, and then Quincy Promes scored the winning goal. Dynamo was awarded a penalty kick during stoppage time after a VAR review, but Daniil Fomin sailed it high over the crossbar.

=== Details ===
29 May 2022
17:00 MSK

Spartak Moscow	2–1	Dynamo Moscow
Sobolev 10'; Promes 72'	Report	Zakharyan 55'

Luzhniki Stadium, Moscow
Attendance: 69,306
Referee: Kirill Levnikov (St. Petersburg)

Spartak Moscow	Dynamo Moscow

GK	98	(Russia) Aleksandr Maksimenko
DF	14	(Russia) Georgi Dzhikiya (c)		(substituted off) 66'
DF	2	(France) Samuel Gigot	(yellow card) 90+3'
DF	68	(Russia) Ruslan Litvinov
MF	24	(Netherlands) Quincy Promes		(substituted off) 90'
MF	22	(Russia) Mikhail Ignatov		(substituted off) 66'
MF	26	(Russia) Daniil Khlusevich	(yellow card) 26'
MF	25	(Russia) Danil Prutsev
MF	8	(Nigeria) Victor Moses
MF	17	(Luxembourg) Christopher Martins
FW	7	(Russia) Aleksandr Sobolev	(yellow card) 81'	(substituted off) 81'
Substitutes:
GK	57	(Russia) Aleksandr Selikhov
GK	88	(Russia) Ilya Svinov
DF	23	(Russia) Nikita Chernov
DF	92	(Russia) Nikolai Rasskazov
DF	39	(Russia) Pavel Maslov
DF	3	(Belgium) Maximiliano Caufriez		(substituted on) 66'
DF	5	(Russia) Leon Klassen
MF	47	(Russia) Roman Zobnin		(substituted on) 81'
MF	10	(Russia) Zelimkhan Bakayev
MF	18	(Russia) Nail Umyarov		(substituted on) 90'
MF	97	(Russia) Daniil Denisov
FW	19	(Jamaica) Shamar Nicholson		(substituted on) 66'
Manager:
(Italy) Paolo Vanoli (yellow card) 34'

GK	31	(Russia) Igor Leshchuk
DF	4	(Russia) Sergei Parshivlyuk (c)	(substituted off) 77'
DF	7	(Russia) Dmitri Skopintsev	(substituted off) 88'
DF	24	(Russia) Roman Yevgenyev
DF	2	(Uruguay) Guillermo Varela	(substituted off) 88'
DF	5	(Paraguay) Fabián Balbuena
MF	74	(Russia) Daniil Fomin
MF	47	(Russia) Arsen Zakharyan
MF	53	(Poland) Sebastian Szymański
FW	40	(Russia) Fyodor Smolov	(substituted off) 77'
FW	70	(Russia) Konstantin Tyukavin
Substitutes:
GK	1	(Russia) Anton Shunin
DF	3	(Russia) Zaurbek Pliyev
DF	50	(Russia) Aleksandr Kutitsky
DF	15	(Russia) Saba Sazonov
DF	43	(Russia) Denis Osokin
DF	93	(Uruguay) Diego Laxalt
MF	19	(Russia) Daniil Lesovoy	(substituted on) 77'
MF	88	(Russia) Denis Makarov	(substituted on) 88'
MF	78	(Russia) Georgy Sulakvelidze
MF	88	(Croatia) Nikola Moro	(substituted on) 88'
FW	20	(Russia) Vyacheslav Grulyov	(substituted on) 77'
FW	91	(Russia) Yaroslav Gladyshev
Manager:
(Germany) Sandro Schwarz

Man of the Match:

Assistant referees:
Yegor Bolkhovitin (Leningrad Oblast)
Rashid Abusuyev (St. Petersburg)
Fourth official:
Vladimir Moskalyov (Voronezh)
Inspector:
Garyafy Zhafyarov (Moscow)
VAR:
Vladislav Bezborodov (St. Petersburg)
AVAR:
Anton Kobzev (Moscow)

Match rules

- 90 minutes
- No extra time
- Penalty shoot-out if scores level
- Twelve named substitutes
- Maximum of five substitutions
