= 2021–22 FC Spartak Moscow season =

Spartak Moscow
2021–22 season
- Managing director: Yevgeni Melezhikov
- Head coach: Rui Vitória (until 15 December 2021); Paolo Vanoli (from 17 December 2021)
- Stadium: Otkritie Arena
- Premier League: 10th
- Russian Cup: Winners
- UEFA Champions League: Third qualifying round vs Benfica
- UEFA Europa League: Round of 16 (banned)
- Top goalscorer: League: Aleksandr Sobolev (9); All: Aleksandr Sobolev (14)
- Highest home attendance: 11,366 vs Leicester City (20 October 2021)
- Lowest home attendance: 2,713 vs Sochi (26 August 2021)
- Average home league attendance: 6,609 (15 May 2022)
Home colours	Away colours

The 2021–22 season was the 100th season in the existence of FC Spartak Moscow and the club's 30th consecutive season in the top flight of Russian football. In addition to the domestic league, Spartak Moscow participate in this season's editions of the Russian Cup and the UEFA Champions League.

== Squad ==
As of match played 29 May 2022

No.	Name	Nationality	Position	Date of birth (age)	Signed from	Signed in	Contract ends	Apps.	Goals
27	Timur Akmurzin	(Russia)	GK	7 December 1997 (aged 24)	Rubin Kazan	2019		0	0
31	Anton Shitov	(Russia)	GK	29 January 2000 (aged 22)	Ararat Moscow	2018		0	0
57	Aleksandr Selikhov	(Russia)	GK	7 April 1994 (aged 28)	Amkar Perm	2016		55	0
88	Ilya Svinov	(Russia)	GK	25 September 2000 (aged 21)	Fakel Voronezh	2022	2025	0	0
98	Aleksandr Maksimenko	(Russia)	GK	23 February 1998 (aged 24)	Youth Team	2014		124	0
Defenders
2	Samuel Gigot	(France)	DF	12 October 1993 (aged 28)	on loan from Marseille	2022	2022	110	10
3	Maximiliano Caufriez	(Belgium)	DF	16 February 1997 (aged 25)	Sint-Truidense	2021		25	0
5	Leon Klassen	(Russia)	DF	29 May 2000 (aged 22)	Tirol	2022	2025	3	0
14	Georgi Dzhikiya	(Russia)	DF	21 November 1993 (aged 28)	Amkar Perm	2016		173	4
23	Nikita Chernov	(Russia)	DF	14 January 1996 (aged 26)	Krylia Sovetov	2022	2026	7	0
29	Ilya Kutepov	(Russia)	DF	29 July 1993 (aged 28)	Akademiya Tolyatti	2012		114	2
35	Leonid Mironov	(Russia)	DF	14 September 1998 (aged 23)	Youth team	2015		1	0
36	Artyom Voropayev	(Russia)	DF	30 October 1999 (aged 22)	Lada-Tolyatti	2018	2019	0	0
39	Pavel Maslov	(Russia)	DF	14 April 2000 (aged 22)	Tyumen	2018	2024	39	0
63	Daniil Petrunin	(Russia)	DF	10 June 1999 (aged 22)	Youth team	2015		1	0
92	Nikolai Rasskazov	(Russia)	DF	4 January 1998 (aged 24)	Youth team	2015		75	2
97	Daniil Denisov	(Russia)	DF	21 October 2002 (aged 19)	Youth team	2020		8	0
Midfielders
8	Victor Moses	(Nigeria)	MF	12 December 1990 (aged 31)	Chelsea	2021	2023	52	7
10	Zelimkhan Bakayev	(Russia)	MF	1 July 1996 (aged 25)	Youth team	2013		104	14
17	Christopher Martins	(Luxembourg)	MF	19 February 1997 (aged 25)	on loan from Young Boys	2022	2022	14	1
18	Nail Umyarov	(Russia)	MF	27 June 2000 (aged 21)	Chertanovo Moscow	2019		81	1
22	Mikhail Ignatov	(Russia)	MF	4 May 2000 (aged 22)	Youth team	2016		51	2
25	Danil Prutsev	(Russia)	MF	25 March 2000 (aged 22)	Krylia Sovetov	2022	2026	9	0
26	Daniil Khlusevich	(Russia)	MF	26 February 2001 (aged 21)	Arsenal Tula	2021	2026	12	0
47	Roman Zobnin	(Russia)	MF	11 February 1994 (aged 28)	Dynamo Moscow	2016		180	10
68	Ruslan Litvinov	(Russia)	MF	18 August 2001 (aged 20)	Youth team	2018		34	2
73	Vladislav Shitov	(Russia)	MF	7 May 2003 (aged 19)	Youth team	2021		2	0
74	Dmitri Markitesov	(Russia)	MF	22 March 2001 (aged 21)	Youth team	2018		11	0
75	Fanil Sungatulin	(Russia)	MF	24 December 2001 (aged 20)	Youth team	2021		1	0
80	Nikita Bakalyuk	(Russia)	MF	3 April 2001 (aged 21)	Youth team	2018		1	0
84	Stepan Oganesyan	(Russia)	MF	28 September 2001 (aged 20)	Youth team	2019		2	0
90	Konstantin Shiltsov	(Russia)	MF	7 May 2002 (aged 20)	Youth team	2019		1	0
Forwards
7	Aleksandr Sobolev	(Russia)	FW	7 March 1997 (aged 25)	Krylia Sovetov	2020		73	33
13	Nikoloz Kutateladze	(Georgia (country))	FW	19 March 2001 (aged 21)	Anzhi Makhachkala	2019		0	0
19	Shamar Nicholson	(Jamaica)	FW	16 March 1997 (aged 25)	Charleroi	2022		16	8
24	Quincy Promes	(Netherlands)	FW	4 January 1992 (aged 30)	Ajax	2021	2024	176	81
87	Artur Maksimchuk	(Russia)	FW	12 January 2002 (aged 20)	Saturn Ramenskoye	2022	2025	0	0
Contracts suspended
11	Jordan Larsson	(Sweden)	FW	20 June 1997 (aged 24)	IFK Norrköping	2019		83	27
Away on loan
4	Jorrit Hendrix	(Netherlands)	MF	6 February 1995 (aged 27)	PSV Eindhoven	2021		22	0
6	Ayrton Lucas	(Brazil)	DF	19 June 1997 (aged 24)	Fluminense	2018		108	4
9	Ezequiel Ponce	(Argentina)	FW	29 March 1997 (aged 25)	Roma	2019		73	25
33	Alex Král	(Czech Republic)	MF	19 May 1998 (aged 24)	Slavia Prague	2019		60	0
56	Ilya Gaponov	(Russia)	DF	25 October 1997 (aged 24)	Strogino Moscow	2018		23	0
61	Ilya Golosov	(Russia)	DF	9 August 2001 (aged 20)	Lokomotiv Moscow	2019	2024	3	0
77	Reziuan Mirzov	(Russia)	FW	22 June 1993 (aged 28)	Rostov	2019		33	1
93	Nikita Morgunov	(Russia)	DF	31 January 2001 (aged 21)	Youth team	2018		0	0
	Guus Til	(Netherlands)	MF	22 December 1997 (aged 24)	AZ Alkmaar	2019		24	2
	Maksim Glushenkov	(Russia)	MF	28 July 1999 (aged 22)	Chertanovo Moscow	2019		11	0
	Oston Urunov	(Uzbekistan)	MF	19 December 2000 (aged 21)	Ufa	2020		9	1
	Pedro Rocha	(Brazil)	FW	1 October 1994 (aged 27)	Grêmio	2017		19	1
Players that left Spartak Moscow during the season
21	Georgi Melkadze	(Russia)	FW	4 April 1997 (aged 25)	Youth team	2014		26	0
23	Aleksandr Lomovitsky	(Russia)	MF	27 January 1998 (aged 24)	Youth team	2015		46	0
32	Artyom Rebrov	(Russia)	GK	4 March 1984 (aged 38)	Shinnik Yaroslavl	2011		132	0
38	Andrey Yeshchenko	(Russia)	DF	9 February 1984 (aged 38)	Anzhi Makhachkala	2016		109	1
71	Stepan Melnikov	(Russia)	MF	25 April 2002 (aged 20)	Youth team	2021		1	0
79	Aleksandr Rudenko	(Russia)	FW	15 March 1999 (aged 23)	Youth team	2015		0	0
89	Ilya Golyatov	(Russia)	FW	6 April 2002 (aged 20)	Youth team	2019		0	0

=== Contract suspensions ===
Note: Flags indicate national team as defined under FIFA eligibility rules; some limited exceptions apply. Players may hold more than one non-FIFA nationality.

No.	Pos.	Nation	Player
—	FW	SWE	Jordan Larsson (at AIK)

=== Out on loan ===
Note: Flags indicate national team as defined under FIFA eligibility rules; some limited exceptions apply. Players may hold more than one non-FIFA nationality.

No.	Pos.	Nation	Player
—	DF	BRA	Ayrton Lucas (at Flamengo)
—	DF	RUS	Ilya Gaponov (at Krylia Sovetov Samara)
—	DF	RUS	Ilya Golosov (at Rotor Volgograd)
—	DF	RUS	Nikita Morgunov (at Lada-Tolyatti)
—	MF	RUS	Maksim Glushenkov (at Krylia Sovetov Samara)
—	MF	NED	Jorrit Hendrix (at Feyenoord)

No.	Pos.	Nation	Player
—	MF	CZE	Alex Král (at West Ham United)
—	MF	RUS	Reziuan Mirzov (at Khimki)
—	MF	NED	Guus Til (at Feyenoord)
—	MF	UZB	Oston Urunov (at FC Ufa)
—	FW	ARG	Ezequiel Ponce (at Elche)
—	FW	BRA	Pedro Rocha (at Athletico Paranaense)

== Transfers ==
=== In ===
Date	Position	Nationality	Name	From	Fee	Ref.
2 June 2021	DF	(Russia)	Ilya Agapov	Rubin Kazan	Undisclosed	
2 July 2021	MF	(Nigeria)	Victor Moses	Chelsea	Undisclosed	
9 July 2021	FW	(Russia)	Artyom Bykovskiy	Master-Saturn Yegoryevsk	Undisclosed	
29 August 2021	DF	(Belgium)	Maximiliano Caufriez	Sint-Truiden	Undisclosed	
1 November 2021	MF	(Russia)	Daniil Khlusevich	Arsenal Tula	Undisclosed	
6 December 2021	GK	(Russia)	Ilya Svinov	Fakel Voronezh	Undisclosed	
21 December 2021	FW	(Jamaica)	Shamar Nicholson	Charleroi	Undisclosed	
30 December 2021	DF	(Russia)	Leon Klassen	WSG Tirol	Undisclosed	
21 January 2022	MF	(Russia)	Danil Prutsev	Krylia Sovetov	Undisclosed	
25 January 2022	FW	(Russia)	Artur Maksimchuk	Saturn Ramenskoye	Undisclosed	
22 February 2022	DF	(Russia)	Nikita Chernov	Krylia Sovetov	Undisclosed	

=== Loans in ===
Date from	Position	Nationality	Name	From	Date to	Ref.
29 January 2022	DF	(France)	Samuel Gigot	Marseille	End of season	
31 January 2022	MF	(Luxembourg)	Christopher Martins	Young Boys	End of season	

=== Out ===
Date	Position	Nationality	Name	To	Fee	Ref.
11 May 2021	MF	(Russia)	Ayaz Guliyev	Arsenal Tula	Undisclosed	
21 June 2021	MF	(Russia)	Aleksandr Tashayev	Rotor Volgograd	Undisclosed	
31 July 2021	MF	(Russia)	Artyom Timofeyev	Akhmat Grozny	Undisclosed	
18 August 2021	GK	(Italy)	Andrea Romagnoli	Catanzaro	Undisclosed	
29 December 2021	MF	(Russia)	Aleksandr Lomovitsky	Rubin Kazan	Undisclosed	
17 January 2022	FW	(Russia)	Svyatoslav Kozhedub	Akron Tolyatti	Undisclosed	
20 January 2022	FW	(Russia)	Stepan Melnikov	Rostov	Undisclosed	
25 January 2022	FW	(Russia)	Georgi Melkadze	Sochi	Undisclosed	
29 January 2022	DF	(France)	Samuel Gigot	Marseille	Undisclosed	
14 February 2022	GK	(Russia)	Artyom Poplevchenkov	Kuban Krasnodar	Undisclosed	
20 February 2022	FW	(Russia)	Aleksandr Rudenko	Khimki	Undisclosed	
22 February 2022	FW	(Russia)	Ilya Golyatov	Volna Nizhny Novgorod Oblast	Undisclosed	

=== Loans out ===
Date from	Position	Nationality	Name	To	Date to	Ref.
2 June 2021	MF	(Netherlands)	Guus Til	Feyenoord	End of season	
11 July 2021	DF	(Russia)	Nikita Morgunov	Tyumen	End of season	
22 July 2021	DF	(Russia)	Ilya Golosov	Rotor Volgograd	22 February 2022	
23 July 2021	MF	(Russia)	Maksim Glushenkov	Krylia Sovetov	End of season	
13 August 2021	FW	(Brazil)	Pedro Rocha	Athletico Paranaense	End of season	
19 August 2021	MF	(Uzbekistan)	Oston Urunov	Ufa	End of season	
31 August 2021	MF	(Czech Republic)	Alex Král	West Ham United	End of season	
7 September 2021	MF	(Russia)	Reziuan Mirzov	Khimki	End of season	
26 January 2022	MF	(Netherlands)	Jorrit Hendrix	Feyenoord	End of season	
31 January 2022	FW	(Argentina)	Ezequiel Ponce	Elche	End of season	
22 February 2022	DF	(Russia)	Ilya Gaponov	Krylia Sovetov	End of season	
31 March 2022	DF	(Brazil)	Ayrton Lucas	Flamengo	31 December 2022	

=== Contract suspensions ===
Date	Position	Nationality	Name	Joined	Date	Ref.
4 April 2022	FW	(Sweden)	Jordan Larsson	AIK	30 June 2022	

=== Released ===
Date	Position	Nationality	Name	Joined	Date	Ref.
1 June 2021	DF	(Russia)	Georgi Tigiyev			
14 December 2021	GK	(Russia)	Artyom Rebrov	Retired		
13 January 2022	DF	(Russia)	Andrey Yeshchenko	Retired		
1 June 2022	MF	(Russia)	Zelimkhan Bakayev	Zenit St.Petersburg	15 June 2022	
2 June 2022	DF	(Russia)	Ilya Kutepov	Torpedo Moscow	1 July 2022	
27 June 2022	FW	(Sweden)	Jordan Larsson	Schalke 04	5 August 2022	

== Pre-season and friendlies ==
Win Draw Loss Fixtures

11 July 2021 Premier Cup	Spartak Moscow (Russia)	4–0	(Russia) Sochi	Moscow, Russia
17:00 MSK (UTC+3)	Bakayev 6'; Mirzov 38'; Sobolev 62'; Moses 83'	Report		Stadium: Otkrytiye Arena

14 July 2021 Friendly	Rubin Kazan (Russia)	0–4	(Russia) Spartak Moscow	Moscow, Russia
20:00 MSK (UTC+3)		Report	Moses 10'; Sobolev 56'; Zobnin 59'; Dzhikiya 63'	Stadium: Otkrytiye Arena

18 July 2021 Friendly	Spartak Moscow (Russia)	5–1	(Russia) Khimki	Moscow, Russia
20:00 MSK (UTC+3)	Gigot 10'; Sobolev 21'; Larsson 29'; Kutepov 66'; Melkadze 75'	Report	Danilkin 90'	Stadium: Otkrytiye Arena

28 January 2022 Friendly	Spartak Moscow (Russia)	2–2	(Slovakia) Slovan Bratislava	Moscow, Russia
16:00 MSK (UTC+3)	Denisov 20'; Bakayev 40'		Weiss 60'; Čavrić 87'	Stadium: Otkrytiye Arena

== Competitions ==
=== Overall record ===
Competition	First match	Last match	Starting round	Final position	Record							
Competition	First match	Last match	Starting round	Final position	Pld	W	D	L	GF	GA	GD	Win %
Premier League	24 July 2021	21 May 2022	Matchday 1	10th	30	10	8	12	37	41	−4	33.33
Russian Cup	2 March 2022	29 May 2021	Round of 16	Winners	4	4	0	0	12	2	+10	100.00
UEFA Champions League	4 August 2021	10 August 2021	Third qualifying round	Third qualifying round	2	0	0	2	0	4	−4	0.00
UEFA Europa League	15 September 2021	9 December 2021	Group stage	Round of 16	6	3	1	2	10	9	+1	50.00
Total					42	17	9	16	59	56	+3	40.48

Last updated: 29 May 2022
Source: Soccerway

=== Premier League ===
==== League table ====
Pos	Team	Pld	W	D	L	GF	GA	GD	Pts
8	Krylia Sovetov Samara	30	12	5	13	39	36	+3	41
9	Rostov	30	10	8	12	47	51	−4	38 (Note: Head-to-head points: Rostov 4, Spartak Moscow 1.)
10	Spartak Moscow	30	10	8	12	37	41	−4	38
11	Nizhny Novgorod	30	8	9	13	26	39	−13	33 (Note: Head-to-head points: Nizhny Novgorod 4, Ural Yekaterinburg 1.)
12	Ural Yekaterinburg	30	8	9	13	27	35	−8	33

Source: Premier Liga
Rules for classification: 1) Points; 2) Head-to-head points; 3) Head-to-head matches won; 4) Head-to-head goal difference; 5) Head-to-head goals scored; 6) Matches won; 7) Goal difference; 8) Goals scored; 9) 2020–21 position (not applicable to final standings); 10) Play-off.

==== Results summary ====
Overall								Home						Away					
Pld	W	D	L	GF	GA	GD	Pts	W	D	L	GF	GA	GD	W	D	L	GF	GA	GD
30	10	8	12	37	36	+1	38	6	5	4	22	17	+5	4	3	8	15	19	−4

Last updated: 21 May 2022.
Source: FBref

==== Results by round ====
Round	1	2	3	4	5	6	7	8	9	10	11	12	13	14	15	16	17	18	19	20	21	22	23	24	25	26	27	28	29	30
Ground	A	A	H	H	A	H	H	A	H	A	H	A	Н	H	А	А	Н	A	H	A	H	A	A	H	H	A	H	A	H	A
Result	L	W	L	W	D	L	W	L	W	W	D	L	D	D	L	D	W	L	L	W	L	D	L	W	D	L	W	W	D	L
Position	12	9	11	10	8	10	9	9	8	7	7	7	9	9	10	10	9	9	9	9	9	9	10	9	10	10	10	9	10	10

Updated to match(es) played on 21 May 2022. Source: Premier Liga
A = Away; H = Home; W = Win; D = Draw; L = Loss

==== Matches ====
24 July 2021 1	Rubin Kazan	1–0	Spartak Moscow	Kazan
20:00 MSK (UTC+3)	Uremović (yellow card) 18'; Abildgaard (yellow card) 37'; Despotović (yellow card) 42'; Samoshnikov 49'; Zuyev (yellow card) 66'; Kvaratskhelia (yellow card) 68'; Shatov (yellow card) 70'	Report	Gigot (yellow card) 18'; Rasskazov (yellow card) 79'; Sobolev (yellow card) 88'; Mirzov (yellow card) 90'	Stadium: Ak Bars Arena; Attendance: 14,409; Referee: Vladislav Bezborodov

30 July 2021 2	Krylia Sovetov	0–1	Spartak Moscow	Samara
19:00 MSK (UTC+3)	Gorshkov (yellow card) 47'; Bozhin (yellow card) 67'; Ivanisenya (yellow card) 90'	Report	Moses (yellow card) 58'; Bakayev (yellow card) 65'; Sobolev 68' (pen.)	Stadium: Solidarnost Arena; Attendance: 500; Referee: Pavel Kukuyan

7 August 2021 3	Spartak Moscow	1–2	Nizhny Novgorod	Moscow
20:00 MSK (UTC+3)	Sololev (yellow card) 63'; Rasskazov (yellow card) 81'; Ponce 86'	Report	Gotsuk 4'; Kozlov 16'	Stadium: Otkritie Arena; Attendance: 2,849; Referee: Aleksei Suhoj

14 August 2021 4	Spartak Moscow	1–0	Ural	Moscow
16:30 MSK (UTC+3)	Rasskazov (yellow card) 23'; Zobnin 27'; Gigot (yellow card) 42'	Report	Gerasimov (yellow card) 33'; Hodzyur (yellow card) 45'; Yegorychev (yellow card) 76'	Stadium: Otkritie Arena; Attendance: 2,945; Referee: Evgeni Kukulyak

21 August 2021 5	Arsenal Tula	1–1	Spartak Moscow	Tula
16:00 MSK (UTC+3)	Smolnikov (yellow card) 16'; Markov (yellow card) 27'; Guliyev (yellow card) 41'; Novoseltev (yellow card) 50'; Khlusevich 82' (yellow card) 90+2'	Report	Zobnin (yellow card) 32'; Hendrix (yellow card) 75'; Ponce 76'; Larsson (yellow card) 86'; Rasskazov (yellow card) 90+7'	Stadium: Arsenal Stadium; Attendance: 2,945; Referee: Vladimir Moskalev

26 August 2021 6	Spartak Moscow	1–2	Sochi	Moscow
18:30 MSK (UTC+3)	Zobnin (yellow card) 38' (goal) 60'; Sobolev (yellow card) 90+2'; Hendrix (yellow card) 90+3'	Report	Angban (yellow card) 34'; Margasov (yellow card) 39'; Rodrigo (yellow card) 41'; Barsov 65'; Yusupov 72'; Dzhanayev (yellow card) 90+5'	Stadium: Otkritie Arena; Attendance: 2,713; Referee: Vitali Meshkov

11 September 2021 7	Spartak Moscow	3–1	Khimki	Moscow
19:00 MSK (UTC+3)	Dzhikiya (yellow card) 8'; Ayrton 25'; Sobolev (yellow card) 41'; Promes 48'; Umayrov (yellow card) 61'; Ponce 68'; Gigot (yellow card) 81'; Caufriez (yellow card) 88'	Report	Troshechkin (yellow card) 44'; Sokolov (yellow card) 62'; Glushakov (yellow card) 89'	Stadium: Otkritie Arena; Attendance: 2,968; Referee: Sergey Ivanov

20 September 2021 8	CSKA Moscow	1–0	Spartak Moscow	Moscow
19:30 MSK (UTC+3)	Zablotny (yellow card) 43' (yellow-red card) 90+1', (goal) 81'; Bohinen (yellow card) 70'; Oblyakov (yellow card) 75'	Report	Umyarov (yellow card) 53'	Stadium: VEB Arena; Attendance: 9,023; Referee: Sergei Karasev

25 September 2021 9	Spartak Moscow	2–0	Ufa	Moscow
19:00 MSK (UTC+3)	Ponce 3'; Promes 29'	Report	Krotov (yellow card) 18'; Kamilov (yellow card) 19'; Mrzljak (yellow card) 54'; Golubev (yellow card) 68'	Stadium: Otkritie Arena; Attendance: 6,898; Referee: Artem Lyubimov

3 October 2021 10	Akhmat Grozny	0–1	Spartak Moscow	Grozny
19:00 MSK (UTC+3)	Utsiyev (yellow card) 38'; Konovalov (yellow card) 55'	Report	Litvinov (yellow card) 39'; Sobolev 41'; Moses (yellow card) 71'; Ayrton (yellow card) 83'; Lomovitskiy (yellow card) 90+6'	Stadium: Akhmat-Arena; Attendance: 7,640; Referee: Kirill Levnikov

16 October 2021 11	Spartak Moscow	2–2	Dynamo Moscow	Moscow
19:00 MSK (UTC+3)	Gigot (yellow card) 42' (goal) 90'; Dzhikiya (yellow card) 42' (goal) 87'	Report	Fomin (yellow card) 11'; Ordets 17'; N'Jie (yellow card) 22'; Yevgenyev (yellow card) 33'; Zakharyan (yellow card) 42'; Grulyov (yellow card) 42'; Szymański (yellow card) 47'; Tyukavin 60'	Stadium: Otkritie Arena; Attendance: 10,443; Referee: Sergei Karasev

24 October 2021 12	Zenit St. Petersburg	7–1	Spartak Moscow	Saint Petersburg
19:00 MSK (UTC+3)	Azmoun 20', 36'; Claudinho 28'; Mostovoy 45', 56'; Rakitskyi (yellow card) 72'; Dzyuba 80' (pen.); Yerokhin 88'	Report	Promes 53'; Caufriez (yellow card) 65' (yellow-red card) 79'; Bakaev (yellow card) 90+2'	Stadium: Krestovsky Stadium; Attendance: 18,721; Referee: Sergey Ivanov

30 October 2021 13	Spartak Moscow	1–1	Rostov	Moscow
16:30 MSK (UTC+3)	Litvinov 78'; Bakayev (yellow card) 84'; Dzhikiya (yellow card) 87'; Sobolev (yellow card) 90'	Report	Glebov 90+6'	Stadium: Otkritie Arena; Attendance: 6,199; Referee: Artyom Lyubimov

7 November 2021 14	Spartak Moscow	1–1	Lokomotiv Moscow	Moscow
19:00 MSK (UTC+3)	Litvinov (yellow card) 11' (yellow-red card) 35'; Sobolev (yellow card) 36'; Bakayev (yellow card) 36'; Umyarov 64'	Report	Kerk 23'; Maradishvili (yellow card) 26'; Kulikov (yellow card) 30'; Kerk (yellow card) 45+1'; Zhivoglyadov (yellow card) 55'; Barinov (yellow card) 78'; Jedvaj (yellow card) 90' (yellow-red card) 90'	Stadium: Otkritie Arena; Attendance: 7,186; Referee: Ivan Sidenkov

20 November 2021 15	Krasnodar	2–1	Spartak Moscow	Krasnodar
19:00 MSK (UTC+3)	Córdoba 16'; Chernikov (yellow card) 33'; Krychowiak 60' (pen.); Spertsyan (yellow card) 66'; Vilhena (yellow card) 74'	Report	Umyarov (yellow card) 10'; Sobolev 45+3' (pen.); Caufriez (yellow card) 56'; Ayrton (yellow card) 59'	Stadium: Krasnodar Stadium; Attendance: 10,554; Referee: Alexey Sukhoi

29 November 2021 16	Ufa	1–1	Spartak Moscow	Ufa
17:00 MSK (UTC+3)	Krotov (yellow card) 37'; Zhuralev (yellow card) 38'; Kamilov (yellow card) 45+3'; Mrzljak (yellow card) 54'; Jokić (yellow card) 67'; Nikitin 71' (yellow card) 90+3'; Aliyev (yellow card) 88'	Report	Ayrton (yellow card) 19'; Umayrov (yellow card) 43'; Rasskazov (yellow card) 74' (yellow-red card) 86'	Stadium: BetBoom Arena; Attendance: 1,325; Referee: Pavel Kukuyan

4 December 2021 17	Spartak Moscow	2–1	Akmat Grozny	Moscow
17:00 MSK (UTC+3)	Moses 13'; Sobolev (red card) 32'; Promes (yellow card) 65' (goal) 87'; Gigot (yellow card) 72'; Ayrton (yellow card) 89'; Selikhov (yellow card) 90+2'	Report	Konovalov (yellow card) 5'; Semyonov (yellow card) 38'; Utkin 45+3'; Arkhipov (yellow card) 49'	Stadium: Otkritie Arena; Attendance: 5,850; Referee: Vitali Meshkov

13 December 2021 18	Sochi	3–0	Spartak Moscow	Sochi
17:00 MSK (UTC+3)	Noboa 28' (red card) 65'; Yusupov (yellow card) 36' (goal) 90+7'; Prokhin (yellow card) 45+3'; Tsallagov (yellow card) 48'; Rodrigo (yellow card) 63'; Popov 89'; Adamov (yellow card) 90+1' (yellow-red card) 90+3'	Report	Ignatov (yellow card) 27'; Gigot (yellow card) 79'; Bakaev (yellow card) 90'; Caufriez (red card) 90+6'	Stadium: Fisht Olympic Stadium; Attendance: 9,298; Referee: Sergey Ivanov

26 February 2022 19	Spartak Moscow	0–2	CSKA Moscow	Moscow
19:00 MSK (UTC+3)	Umyarov (yellow card) 40'; Moses (yellow card) 90+6'	Report	Fernandes (yellow card) 24'; Carrascal (yellow card) 30'; Yazıcı 49'; Zaynutdinov 79'; Ejuke (yellow card) 83'	Stadium: Otkritie Arena; Attendance: 10,961; Referee: Vitali Meshkov

6 March 2022 20	Dynamo Moscow	0–2	Spartak Moscow	Moscow
19:00 MSK (UTC+3)	Grulyov (yellow card) 3'; Varela (yellow card) 42' (yellow-red card) 45+3'; Zakharyan (yellow card) 65'	Report	Caufriez (yellow card) 1'; Nicholson 26'; Promes 37'; Ayrton (yellow card) 40'; Martins (yellow card) 72'; Umyarov (yellow card) 86'	Stadium: VTB Arena; Attendance: 19,353; Referee: Sergei Karasev

13 March 2022 21	Spartak Moscow	1 – 2	Krasnodar	Moscow
19:00 MSK (UTC+3)	Promes 38' (pen.); Umyarov (yellow card) 43'; Nicholson (yellow card) 44'	Report	Spertsyan 5', 86' (pen.); Chernikov (yellow card) 31'	Stadium: Otkritie Arena; Attendance: 4,969; Referee: Evgeny Kukulyak

19 March 2022 22	Nizhny Novgorod	1 – 1	Spartak Moscow	Nizhny Novgorod
14:00 MSK (UTC+3)	Ennin (yellow card) 43'; Suleymanov (yellow card) 55'; Yuldoshev 74'; Stotsky (yellow card) 75'; Kravtsov (yellow card) 88'; Nigmatullin (yellow card) 90+'	Report	Martins 72' (yellow card) 83'; Promes (penalty missed) 79'; Ignatov (yellow card) 90+'	Stadium: Nizhny Novgorod Stadium; Attendance: 18,517; Referee: Sergey Ivanov

2 April 2022 23	Lokomotiv Moscow	1 – 0	Spartak Moscow	Moscow
20:30 MSK (UTC+3)	Beka Beka (yellow card) 24'; Babkin (yellow card) 58'; Maradishvili (yellow card) 80'; Isidor 85' (yellow card) 90+'	Report	Caufriez (yellow card) 48'	Stadium: RZD Arena; Attendance: 15,073; Referee: Sergei Karasev

10 April 2022 24	Spartak Moscow	3 – 0	Arsenal Tula	Moscow
16:30 MSK (UTC+3)	Zobnin 53'; Nicholson 57', 75'; Gigot (yellow card) 62'	Report	K.Kangwa (yellow card) 32' (yellow-red card) 86'; Radaković (yellow card) 44'	Stadium: Otkritie Arena; Attendance: 7,022; Referee: Vladislav Bezborodov

16 April 2022 25	Spartak Moscow	1 – 1	Rubin Kazan	Moscow
19:00 MSK (UTC+3)	Khlusevich (yellow card) 41'; Bakayev (yellow card) 53'; Sobolev 69'	Report	Lomovitsky (yellow card) 10'; Ignatyev 30'	Stadium: Otkritie Arena; Attendance: 7,351; Referee: Pavel Kukuyan

24 April 2022 26	Rostov	3 – 2	Spartak Moscow	Rostov-on-Don
16:30 MSK (UTC+3)	Tugarev 14'; Shchetinin (yellow card) 20'; Bayramyan (yellow card) 66'; Poloz 75' (pen.); Sowe 90+'; Golenkov (yellow card) 90+'	Report	Sobolev 17' (yellow card) 45+'; Chernov (yellow card) 45+3'; Litvinov 90+'; Martins (yellow card) 90+'	Stadium: Rostov Arena; Attendance: 25,082; Referee: Vitali Meshkov

1 May 2022 27	Spartak Moscow	2 – 1	Krylia Sovetov	Moscow
14:00 MSK (UTC+3)	Gigot (yellow card) 8'; Dzhikiya (yellow card) 8'; Selikhov (yellow card) 42'; Sobolev 61' (pen.), 83'; Martins (yellow card) 66'	Report	Gorshkov 30' (pen.); Soldatenkov (yellow card) 60'; Fernando (yellow card) 77'	Stadium: Otkritie Arena; Attendance: 11,844; Referee: Evgeny Turbin

7 May 2022 28	Ural Yekaterinburg	1 – 3	Spartak Moscow	Yekaterinburg
14:00 MSK (UTC+3)	Goglichidze 55'	Report	Nicholson 11', 26'; Moses 30'	Stadium: Central Stadium; Attendance: 26,402; Referee: Vladimir Moskalyov

15 May 2022 29	Spartak Moscow	1 – 1	Zenit St. Petersburg	Moscow
16:30 MSK (UTC+3)	Sobolev 49' (yellow card) 51'; Martins (yellow card) 55'; Moses (yellow card) 85'; Khlusevich (yellow card) 87'; Dzhikiya (yellow card) 90+'	Report	Mostovoy 90+'	Stadium: Otkritie Arena; Attendance: 16,598; Referee: Pavel Kukuyan

21 May 2022 30	Khimki	2 – 1	Spartak Moscow	Khimki
19:00 MSK (UTC+3)	Glushakov 39' (pen.); Bozhenov 44'; Lantratov (yellow card) 87'	Report	Gigot 11'	Stadium: Arena Khimki; Attendance: 4,597; Referee: Sergei Karasev

=== Russian Cup ===
2 March 2022 Round of 16	Spartak Moscow	6–1	Kuban Krasnodar	Moscow
20:00 MSK (UTC+3)	Promes 6', 17'; Nicholson 20', 62', 86'; Khlusevich (yellow card) 47'; Larsson 83'	Report	Sidorov (yellow card) 37'; Dzhikiya 55' (o.g.); Ediyev (yellow card) 61'; Sapeta (yellow card) 89'	Stadium: Otkritie Arena; Referee: Yan Bobrovskiy

20 April 2022 Quarter-final	CSKA Moscow	0–1	Spartak Moscow	Moscow
19:30 MSK (UTC+3)	Carrascal (yellow card) 24'; Gbamin (yellow card) 36' (yellow-red card) 45+3'; Mukhin (yellow card) 37'; Zabolotny (yellow card) 68'; Shchennikov (yellow card) 78'; Fuchs (yellow card) 90+3'	Report	Bakayev 21' (pen.) (yellow card) 32'; Martins (yellow card) 43'; Caufriez (yellow card) 45+1'; Nicholson (yellow card) 78'; Sobolev (yellow card) 87'; Gigot (yellow card) 90+4'; Maksimenko (yellow card) 90+5'	Stadium: VEB Arena; Referee: Vladimir Moskalyov

11 May 2022 Semi-final	Spartak Moscow	3–0	Yenisey Krasnoyarsk	Moscow
19:30 MSK (UTC+3)	Promes 21'; Martins (yellow card) 40'; Bakayev 56'; Sobolev 87'; Litvinov (yellow card) 90'	Report		Stadium: Otkritie Arena; Referee: Sergei Karasev

==== Final ====
29 May 2022 Final	Spartak Moscow	2–1	Dynamo Moscow	Moscow
17:00 MSK (UTC+3)	Sobolev 10' (yellow card) 81'; Khlusevich (yellow card) 26'; Promes 72'; Gigot (yellow card) 90+3'	Report	Zakharyan 55'; Fomin (penalty missed) 90+9'	Stadium: Luzhniki Stadium; Attendance: 69,306; Referee: Kirill Levnikov

=== UEFA Champions League ===
==== Third qualifying round ====
The draw for the third qualifying round was held on 19 July 2021.

4 August 2021 First leg	Spartak Moscow (Russia)	0–2	(Portugal) Benfica	Moscow, Russia
19:00 MSK (UTC+3)	Sobolev (yellow card) 33'; Ignatov (yellow card) 87'	Report	Vertonghen (yellow card) 48'; Silva 51'; Gilberto 74'	Stadium: Otkritie Arena; Attendance: 2,933; Referee: Carlos del Cerro Grande (Spain)

10 August 2021 Second leg	Benfica (Portugal)	2–0 (4–0 agg.)	(Russia) Spartak Moscow	Lisbon, Portugal
20:00 WEST (UTC+1)	Otamendi (yellow card) 16'; João Mário 58'; Weigl (yellow card) 71'; Gigot 90+2' (o.g.)	Report	Lomovitsky (yellow card) 25'; Larsson (yellow card) 68'	Stadium: Estádio da Luz; Attendance: 16,312; Referee: Anthony Taylor (England)

=== UEFA Europa League ===
==== Group stage ====
The draw for the group stage was held on 27 August 2021.

Pos	Team	Pld	W	D	L	GF	GA	GD	Pts	Qualification
1	(Russia) Spartak Moscow	6	3	1	2	10	9	+1	10 (Note: Head–to–head points: Spartak Moscow 6, Napoli 0.)	Advance to round of 16
2	(Italy) Napoli	6	3	1	2	15	10	+5	10	Advance to knockout round play-offs
3	(England) Leicester City	6	2	2	2	12	11	+1	8	Transfer to Europa Conference League
4	(Poland) Legia Warsaw	6	2	0	4	4	11	−7	6	

Source: UEFA
Rules for classification: Group stage tiebreakers
Notes:

15 September 2021 1	Spartak Moscow (Russia)	0–1	(Poland) Legia Warsaw	Moscow, Russia
17:30 MSK (UTC+3)		Report	Kastrati 90+1'	Stadium: Otkritie Arena; Attendance: 6,832; Referee: Nikola Dabanović (Montenegro)

30 September 2021 2	Napoli (Italy)	2–3	(Russia) Spartak Moscow	Naples, Italy
18:45 CEST (UTC+2)	Elmas 1'; Mário Rui (red card) 29'; Di Lorenzo (yellow card) 45+8'; Koulibaly (yellow card) 65'; Fabián (yellow card) 78'; Manolas (yellow card) 85'; Osimhen 90+4'	Report	Ponce (yellow card) 43'; Litvinov (yellow card) 45+1'; Sobolev (yellow card) 45+8'; Promes 55', 90'; Caufriez (yellow card) 65' (yellow-red card) 82'; Ayrton (yellow card) 77'; Ignatov 81'; Maksimenko (yellow card) 89'; Umyarov (yellow card) 90+10'	Stadium: Stadio San Paolo; Attendance: 13,373; Referee: Ivan Kružliak (Slovakia)

20 October 2021 3	Spartak Moscow (Russia)	3–4	(England) Leicester City	Moscow, Russia
17:30 MSK (UTC+3)	Sobolev 11', 86'; Litvinov (yellow card) 33'; Larsson 44'; Lomovitsky (yellow card) 90+5'	Report	Pereira (yellow card) 30'; Daka 45', 48', 54', 79'; Soumaré (yellow card) 89'	Stadium: Otkritie Arena; Attendance: 11,366; Referee: Anastasios Sidiropoulos (Greece)

4 November 2021 4	Leicester City (England)	1–1	(Russia) Spartak Moscow	Leicester, England
20:00 GMT (UTC±0)	Amartey 58'; Tielemans (yellow card) 67'; Vardy (penalty missed) 75'	Report	Moses 51', (yellow card) 74'; Sobolev (yellow card) 59'	Stadium: King Power Stadium; Attendance: 30,222; Referee: Halil Umut Meler (Turkey)

24 November 2021 5	Spartak Moscow (Russia)	2–1	(Italy) Napoli	Moscow, Russia
18:30 MSK (UTC+3)	Sobolev 3' (pen.), 28', (yellow card) 88'; Litvinov (yellow card) 14'; Promes (yellow card) 90+2'	Report	Elmas 64'; Koulibaly (yellow card) 78'	Stadium: Otkritie Arena; Attendance: 10,852; Referee: Clément Turpin (France)

9 December 2021 6	Legia Warsaw (Poland)	0–1	(Russia) Spartak Moscow	Warsaw, Poland
18:45 CET (UTC+1)	Martins (yellow card) 24'; Josué (yellow card) 26'; Slisz (yellow card) 44'; Kastrat (yellow card) 61'; Wieteska (yellow card) 81'; Pekhart (penalty missed) 90+5'	Report	Bakaev 17'; Promes (yellow card) 34'; Dzhikiya (yellow card) 61'; Melkadze (yellow card) 80'	Stadium: Stadion Wojska Polskiego; Attendance: 21,629; Referee: Matej Jug (Slovenia)

==== Knockout stage ====
The draw for the round of 16 was held on 25 February 2022. RB Leipzig won on walkover after Spartak Moscow were disqualified as a result of UEFA's suspension of Russian clubs from all competitions following the Russian invasion of Ukraine.

10 March 2022 Round of 16 First leg	RB Leipzig (Germany)	Cancelled	(Russia) Spartak Moscow	Leipzig, Germany
--:-- CET (UTC+1)				Stadium: Red Bull Arena

17 March 2022 Round of 16 Second leg	Spartak Moscow (Russia)	Cancelled	(Germany) RB Leipzig
--:-- CET (UTC+1)
Note: Spartak Moscow where scheduled to play their home match at a neutral venue due to the ongoing Russian invasion of Ukraine before being suspended.

== Squad statistics ==
As of match played 29 May 2022

=== Appearances and goals ===
No.	Pos	Nat	Player	Total		Premier League		Russian Cup		Champions League		Europa League	
No.	Pos	Nat	Player	Apps	Goals	Apps	Goals	Apps	Goals	Apps	Goals	Apps	Goals
2	DF	(France) FRA	Samuel Gigot	38	2	25+2	2	3	0	2	0	6	0
3	DF	(Belgium) BEL	Maximiliano Caufriez	25	0	15+2	0	3+1	0	0	0	4	0
5	DF	(Russia) RUS	Leon Klassen	3	0	2	0	1	0	0	0	0	0
7	FW	(Russia) RUS	Aleksandr Sobolev	36	15	20+6	9	1+2	2	1+1	0	3+2	4
8	MF	(Nigeria) NGR	Victor Moses	33	3	23+2	2	2	0	0	0	6	1
10	MF	(Russia) RUS	Zelimkhan Bakayev	36	3	15+11	0	3	2	2	0	3+2	1
14	DF	(Russia) RUS	Georgi Dzhikiya	40	1	28	1	4	0	2	0	6	0
17	MF	(Luxembourg) LUX	Christopher Martins	14	1	9+1	1	4	0	0	0	0	0
18	MF	(Russia) RUS	Nail Umyarov	26	1	14+3	1	1+1	0	2	0	4+1	0
19	FW	(Jamaica) JAM	Shamar Nicholson	16	8	8+4	5	3+1	3	0	0	0	0
22	MF	(Russia) RUS	Mikhail Ignatov	35	1	11+13	0	2+2	0	0+2	0	3+2	1
23	DF	(Russia) RUS	Nikita Chernov	7	0	4	0	1+2	0	0	0	0	0
24	FW	(Netherlands) NED	Quincy Promes	31	12	19+3	6	3	4	0	0	5+1	2
25	MF	(Russia) RUS	Danil Prutsev	9	0	2+3	0	2+2	0	0	0	0	0
26	MF	(Russia) RUS	Daniil Khlusevich	12	0	7+2	0	3	0	0	0	0	0
29	DF	(Russia) RUS	Ilya Kutepov	5	0	3+1	0	0	0	0	0	0+1	0
47	MF	(Russia) RUS	Roman Zobnin	33	3	20+5	3	1+1	0	2	0	4	0
57	GK	(Russia) RUS	Aleksandr Selikhov	17	0	14	0	0	0	0	0	3	0
68	MF	(Russia) RUS	Ruslan Litvinov	27	2	15+4	2	2+2	0	0	0	4	0
73	MF	(Russia) RUS	Vladislav Shitov	2	0	0+2	0	0	0	0	0	0	0
74	MF	(Russia) RUS	Dmitri Markitesov	1	0	0+1	0	0	0	0	0	0	0
75	MF	(Russia) RUS	Fanil Sungatulin	1	0	0+1	0	0	0	0	0	0	0
92	DF	(Russia) RUS	Nikolai Rasskazov	25	0	10+8	0	0+2	0	2	0	2+1	0
97	DF	(Russia) RUS	Daniil Denisov	8	0	2+4	0	0+2	0	0	0	0	0
98	GK	(Russia) RUS	Aleksandr Maksimenko	25	0	16	0	4	0	2	0	3	0
Players who suspended their contracts:
11	FW	(Sweden) SWE	Jordan Larsson	23	2	11+6	0	0+1	1	2	0	2+1	1
Players away from the club on loan:
4	MF	(Netherlands) NED	Jorrit Hendrix	11	0	2+6	0	0	0	1	0	0+2	0
6	DF	(Brazil) BRA	Ayrton Lucas	30	1	21	1	1	0	2	0	6	0
9	FW	(Argentina) ARG	Ezequiel Ponce	11	4	6+1	4	0	0	1+1	0	2	0
33	MF	(Czech Republic) CZE	Alex Král	7	0	3+2	0	0	0	0+2	0	0	0
77	MF	(Russia) RUS	Reziuan Mirzov	6	0	1+4	0	0	0	0+1	0	0	0
Players who left Spartak Moscow during the season:
17	MF	(Russia) RUS	Aleksandr Lomovitsky	21	0	4+10	0	0	0	1	0	0+6	0
21	FW	(Russia) RUS	Georgi Melkadze	4	0	0+3	0	0	0	0	0	0+1	0
71	MF	(Russia) RUS	Stepan Melnikov	1	0	0+1	0	0	0	0	0	0	0

=== Goal scorers ===
Place	Position	Nation	Number	Name	Premier League	Russian Cup	Champions League	Europa League	Total
1	FW	(Russia)	7	Aleksandr Sobolev	9	2	0	4	15
2	FW	(Netherlands)	24	Quincy Promes	6	4	0	2	12
3	FW	(Jamaica)	19	Shamar Nicholson	5	3	0	0	8
4	FW	(Argentina)	9	Ezequiel Ponce	4	0	0	0	4
5	MF	(Russia)	47	Roman Zobnin	3	0	0	0	3
5	MF	(Nigeria)	8	Victor Moses	2	0	0	1	3
5	MF	(Russia)	10	Zelimkhan Bakayev	0	2	0	1	3
8	MF	(Russia)	68	Ruslan Litvinov	2	0	0	0	2
8	DF	(France)	2	Samuel Gigot	2	0	0	0	2
8	FW	(Sweden)	11	Jordan Larsson	0	1	0	1	2
11	DF	(Brazil)	6	Ayrton Lucas	1	0	0	0	1
11	DF	(Russia)	14	Georgi Dzhikiya	1	0	0	0	1
11	MF	(Russia)	18	Nail Umyarov	1	0	0	0	1
11	MF	(Luxembourg)	17	Christopher Martins	1	0	0	0	1
11	MF	(Russia)	22	Mikhail Ignatov	0	0	0	1	1
				TOTALS	37	12	0	10	59

=== Clean sheets ===
Place	Position	Nation	Number	Name	Premier League	Russian Cup	Champions League	Europa League	Total
1	GK	(Russia)	98	Aleksandr Maksimenko	5	2	0	0	7
2	GK	(Russia)	57	Aleksandr Selikhov	1	0	0	1	2
				TOTALS	6	2	0	1	9

=== Disciplinary record ===
Number	Nation	Position	Name	Premier League		Russian Cup		Champions League		Europa League		Total	
Number	Nation	Position	Name	Yellow card	Red card	Yellow card	Red card	Yellow card	Red card	Yellow card	Red card	Yellow card	Red card
2	(France)	DF	Samuel Gigot	8	0	2	0	0	0	1	0	11	0
3	(Belgium)	DF	Maximiliano Caufriez	6	2	1	0	0	0	2	1	9	3
7	(Russia)	FW	Aleksandr Sobolev	8	1	2	0	1	0	3	0	14	1
8	(Nigeria)	MF	Victor Moses	4	0	0	0	0	0	1	0	5	0
10	(Russia)	MF	Zelimkhan Bakayev	6	0	1	0	0	0	1	0	8	0
14	(Russia)	DF	Georgi Dzhikiya	5	0	0	0	0	0	1	0	6	0
17	(Luxembourg)	MF	Christopher Martins	5	0	2	0	1	0	0	0	8	0
18	(Russia)	MF	Nail Umyarov	7	0	0	0	0	0	2	0	9	0
19	(Jamaica)	FW	Shamar Nicholson	1	0	1	0	0	0	0	0	2	0
22	(Russia)	MF	Mikhail Ignatov	2	0	0	0	1	0	0	0	3	0
23	(Russia)	DF	Nikita Chernov	1	0	0	0	0	0	0	0	1	0
24	(Netherlands)	FW	Quincy Promes	1	0	0	0	0	0	2	0	3	0
26	(Russia)	MF	Daniil Khlusevich	2	0	2	0	0	0	0	0	4	0
47	(Russia)	MF	Roman Zobnin	2	0	0	0	0	0	0	0	2	0
57	(Russia)	GK	Aleksandr Selikhov	2	0	0	0	0	0	0	0	2	0
68	(Russia)	MF	Ruslan Litvinov	3	1	1	0	0	0	3	0	7	1
92	(Russia)	DF	Nikolai Rasskazov	6	1	0	0	0	0	0	0	6	1
98	(Russia)	GK	Aleksandr Maksimenko	0	0	1	0	0	0	1	0	2	0
Players who suspended their contracts:
11	(Sweden)	FW	Jordan Larsson	1	0	0	0	1	0	0	0	2	0
Players away on loan:
4	(Netherlands)	MF	Jorrit Hendrix	2	0	0	0	0	0	0	0	2	0
6	(Brazil)	DF	Ayrton Lucas	5	0	0	0	0	0	1	0	6	0
9	(Argentina)	FW	Ezequiel Ponce	0	0	0	0	0	0	1	0	1	0
77	(Russia)	MF	Reziuan Mirzov	1	0	0	0	0	0	0	0	1	0
Players who left Spartak Moscow during the season:
17	(Russia)	MF	Aleksandr Lomovitsky	1	0	0	0	1	0	2	0	4	0
21	(Russia)	FW	Georgi Melkadze	0	0	0	0	0	0	1	0	1	0
			TOTALS	79	5	13	0	4	0	22	1	118	6
