= Ruslan Litvinov =

Russian footballer (born 2001)

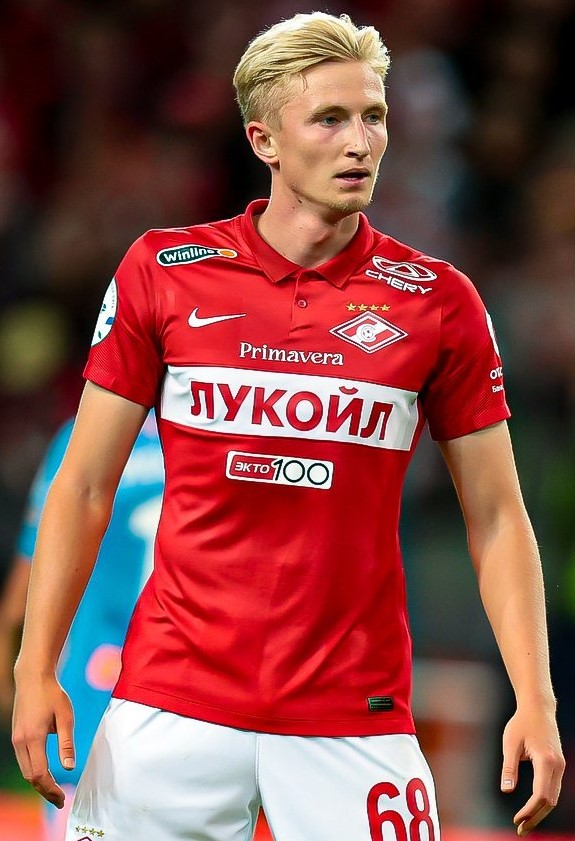
- Litvinov with Spartak Moscow in 2022

Personal information
- Full name: Ruslan Romanovich Litvinov
- Date of birth: 18 August 2001 (age 25)
- Place of birth: Voronezh, Russia
- Height: 1.83 m (6 ft 0 in)
- Position: Centre-back

Team information
- Current team: FC Spartak Moscow
- Number: 68

Youth career
- 2005–2016: Shmarov Football Center-73 Voronezh
- 2016–2019: Spartak Moscow

Senior career*
Years	Team	Apps	(Gls)
2019–2021	Spartak-2 Moscow	35	(3)
2020–	Spartak Moscow	132	(6)

International career^{‡}
2017–2018	Russia U-17	6	(1)
2018–2019	Russia U-18	19	(5)
2019	Russia U-19	7	(0)
2019	Russia U-20	5	(1)
2020–2021	Russia U-21	8	(0)
2022–	Russia	8	(0)
- * Club domestic league appearances and goals as of 22 November 2026 ‡ National team caps and goals as of 27 March 2026

Ruslan Romanovich Litvinov (Russian: Руслан Романович Литвинов; born 18 August 2001) is a Russian football player who plays as a centre back for FC Spartak Moscow and the Russian national team.

== Club career ==
He made his debut in the Russian Football National League for FC Spartak-2 Moscow on 20 August 2019 in a game against FC Yenisey Krasnoyarsk, he substituted Mikhail Ignatov in the 79th minute.

He made his debut for the main squad of FC Spartak Moscow on 21 October 2020 in a Russian Cup game against FC Yenisey Krasnoyarsk. He made his Russian Premier League debut for Spartak on 5 December 2020 in a game against FC Tambov, he substituted Alex Král in the 3rd added minute.

On 7 February 2022, Litvinov extended his contract with Spartak until May 2026. On 29 May 2022, he won the Russian Cup, playing the full final against Dynamo Moscow, which Spartak won 2–1.

== International career ==
Litvinov was called up to the Russia national football team for the first time in November 2022 for friendly games against Tajikistan and Uzbekistan. He made his debut against Uzbekistan on 20 November 2022.

== Career statistics ==
=== Club ===
As of match played 22 November 2026

Appearances and goals by club, season and competition
Club	Season	League			Cup		Europe		Other		Total	
Club	Season	Division	Apps	Goals	Apps	Goals	Apps	Goals	Apps	Goals	Apps	Goals
Spartak-2 Moscow	2019–20	Russian Football National League	7	0	—		—		—		7	0
Spartak-2 Moscow	2020–21	Russian Football National League	24	2	—		—		—		24	2
Spartak-2 Moscow	2021–22	Russian Football National League	4	1	—		—		—		4	1
Spartak-2 Moscow	Total		35	3	—		—		—		35	3
Spartak Moscow	2020–21	Russian Premier League	6	0	1	0	—		—		7	0
Spartak Moscow	2021–22	Russian Premier League	19	2	4	0	4 (Note: Appearances in the UEFA Europa League)	0	—		27	2
Spartak Moscow	2022–23	Russian Premier League	25	3	6	0	—		1 (Note: Appearances in the Russian Super Cup)	0	32	3
Spartak Moscow	2023–24	Russian Premier League	24	0	7	0	—		—		31	0
Spartak Moscow	2024–25	Russian Premier League	21	0	10	0	—		—		31	0
Spartak Moscow	2025–26	Russian Premier League	27	1	9	2	—		—		36	3
Spartak Moscow	2026–27	Russian Premier League	10	0	4	0	—		1	0	15	0
Spartak Moscow	Total		132	6	41	2	4	0	2	0	179	8
Career total			167	9	41	2	4	0	2	0	214	11

=== International ===
As of match played 27 March 2026

Appearances and goals by national team and year
National team	Year	Apps	Goals
Russia	2022	1	0
Russia	2023	2	0
Russia	2024	1	0
Russia	2025	3	0
Russia	2026	1	0
Total		8	0

== Honours ==
Spartak Moscow

- Russian Cup: 2021–22, 2025–26

Individual

- Russian Premier League Goal of the Month: March 2023, March 2026.
- Russian Premier League Team of the Season: 2022–23
