= Aleksandr Sobolev =

Russian footballer (born 1997)

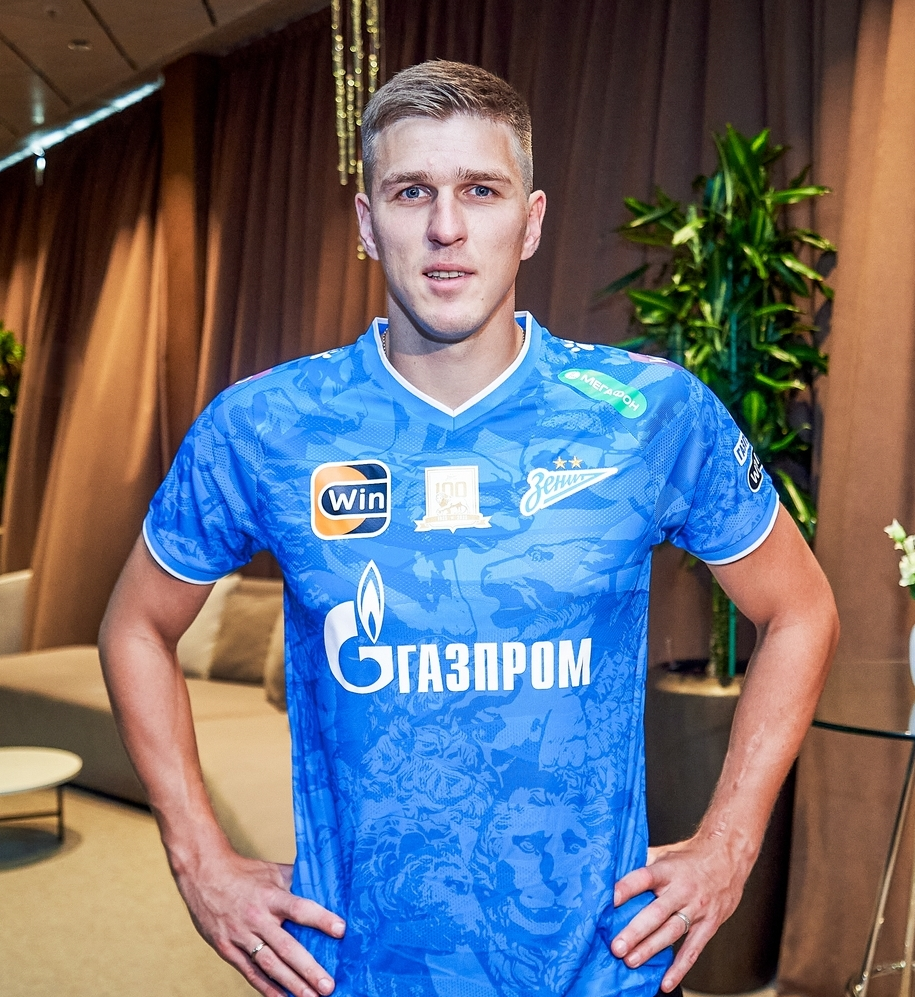
- Sobolev with Zenit St. Petersburg in 2024

Personal information
- Full name: Aleksandr Sergeyevich Sobolev
- Date of birth: 7 March 1997 (age 29)
- Place of birth: Barnaul, Russia
- Height: 1.92 m (6 ft 4 in)
- Position: Forward

Team information
- Current team: Zenit St. Petersburg
- Number: 7

Youth career
- 2002–2016: Dynamo Barnaul

Senior career*
Years	Team	Apps	(Gls)
2016–2017	Tom Tomsk	37	(9)
2018–2020	Krylia Sovetov Samara	42	(19)
2019	→ Yenisey Krasnoyarsk (loan)	10	(3)
2020	→ Spartak Moscow (loan)	11	(2)
2020–2024	Spartak Moscow	102	(41)
2024–	Zenit St. Petersburg	65	(24)

International career^{‡}
2018	Russia U21	2	(0)
2020–	Russia	18	(6)
- * Club domestic league appearances and goals as of 21 November 2026 ‡ National team caps and goals as of 6 October 2026

Aleksandr Sergeyevich Sobolev (Russian: Александр Сергеевич Соболев; born 7 March 1997) is a Russian professional footballer who plays as a striker for Zenit St. Petersburg and the Russia national team.

== Club career ==
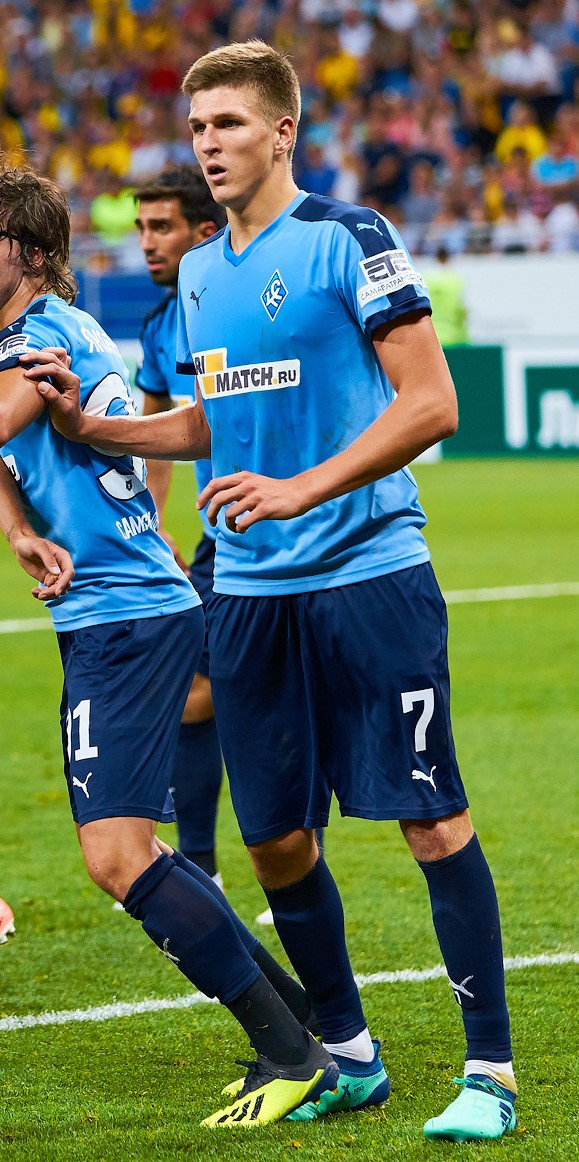
Sobolev playing for Krylia Sovetov in 2018

Sobolev made his Russian Premier League debut for FC Tom Tomsk on 5 December 2016 in a game against FC Ufa.

Sobolev scored more goals than any other player in the 2017–18 Russian Cup.

On 2 February 2019, Sobolev joined Yenisey Krasnoyarsk on loan.

On 29 January 2020, Sobolev joined Spartak Moscow on loan until the end of the 2019–20 season, with Spartak holding an option to purchase his rights at the end of the loan.

On 18 May 2020, Spartak Moscow announced that they had exercised the option to purchase Sobolev from Krylia Sovetov.

On 13 August 2021, he extended his contract with Spartak until May 2026. On 29 May 2022, Sobolev scored the opening goal in the 2022 Russian Cup Final against FC Dynamo Moscow which Spartak won 2–1.

On 30 August 2024, Sobolev signed a contract with Zenit St. Petersburg for three seasons, with an option for a fourth.

== International career ==
On 6 October 2019, Sobolev was called up to the Russia national team for the first time for the UEFA Euro 2020 qualifying matches against Scotland and Cyprus, replacing injured Fedor Smolov.

He made his debut on 8 October 2020 in a friendly against Sweden and scored an added-time goal in a 2–1 home loss.

On 11 May 2021, he was included in the preliminary extended 30-man squad for UEFA Euro 2020. On 2 June 2021, he was included in the final squad. He appeared as a late substitute in Russia's second game against Finland on 16 June in a 1–0 victory. He appeared as a substitute for the last half-hour of the match on 21 June in the last group game against Denmark as Russia lost 4–1 and was eliminated.

== Career statistics ==
=== Club ===
As of match played 21 November 2026

Appearances and goals by club, season and competition
Club	Season	League			Cup		Continental		Other		Total	
Club	Season	Division	Apps	Goals	Apps	Goals	Apps	Goals	Apps	Goals	Apps	Goals
Tom Tomsk	2016–17	Russian Premier League	13	3	0	0	—		—		13	3
Tom Tomsk	2017–18	Russian First League	24	6	3	3	—		—		27	9
Tom Tomsk	Total		37	9	3	3	0	0	0	0	40	12
Krylia Sovetov Samara	2017–18	Russian First League	12	8	1	1	—		2 (Note: Appearances in the FNL Cup)	0	15	9
Krylia Sovetov Samara	2018–19	Russian Premier League	12	1	1	1	—		—		13	2
Krylia Sovetov Samara	2019–20	Russian Premier League	18	10	1	0	—		—		19	10
Krylia Sovetov Samara	Total		42	19	3	2	0	0	2	0	47	21
Yenisey Krasnoyarsk (loan)	2018–19	Russian Premier League	10	3	—		—		—		10	3
Spartak Moscow (loan)	2019–20	Russian Premier League	11	2	2	1	—		1 (Note: Appearances in the Russian Super Cup)	0	14	3
Spartak Moscow	2020–21	Russian Premier League	22	14	2	1	—		—		24	15
Spartak Moscow	2021–22	Russian Premier League	26	9	3	2	7 (Note: Two appearances in the UEFA Champions League, five appearances, four goals in the UEFA Europa League)	4	—		36	15
Spartak Moscow	2022–23	Russian Premier League	26	13	5	2	—		1	0	32	15
Spartak Moscow	2023–24	Russian Premier League	27	5	7	5	—		—		34	10
Spartak Moscow	2024–25	Russian Premier League	1	0	0	0	—		—		1	0
Spartak Moscow	Total		102	41	17	10	7	4	1	0	127	55
Zenit St. Petersburg	2024–25	Russian Premier League	23	4	8	3	—		—		31	7
Zenit St. Petersburg	2025–26	Russian Premier League	28	10	10	3	—		—		38	13
Zenit St. Petersburg	2026–27	Russian Premier League	14	10	2	2	—		1	1	17	13
Zenit St. Petersburg	Total		66	24	20	8	0	0	1	1	86	33
Career total			267	98	45	24	7	4	5	1	324	127

=== International ===
As of match played 6 October 2026

Russia
Year	Apps	Goals
2020	3	1
2021	5	2
2022	2	1
2023	5	2
2024	0	0
2025	0	0
2026	3	0
Total	18	6

=== International goals ===
Scores and results list Russia's goal tally first, score column indicates score after each Sobolev goal.

List of international goals scored by Aleksandr Sobolev
No.	Date	Venue	Opponent	Score	Result	Competition
1	8 October 2020	VEB Arena, Moscow, Russia	Sweden	1–2	1–2	Friendly
2	24 March 2021	National Stadium, Ta' Qali, Malta	Malta	3–1	3–1	2022 FIFA World Cup qualification
3	5 June 2021	VTB Arena, Moscow, Russia	Bulgaria	1–0	1–0	Friendly
4	24 September 2022	Dolen Omurzakov Stadium, Bishkek, Kyrgyzstan	Kyrgyzstan	1–1	2–1	Friendly
5	16 October 2023	Mardan Sports Complex, Aksu, Turkey	Kenya	1–0	2–2	Friendly
6	20 November 2023	Volgograd Arena, Volgograd, Russia	Cuba	5–0	8–0	Friendly

== Honours ==
Spartak Moscow

- Russian Cup: 2021–22

Zenit Saint Petersburg

- Russian Premier League: 2025–26
- Russian Super Cup: 2026

Individual

- Russian Premier League Player of the Month: July 2019, March 2021, August 2022.
