= Fanil Sungatulin =

Russian footballer

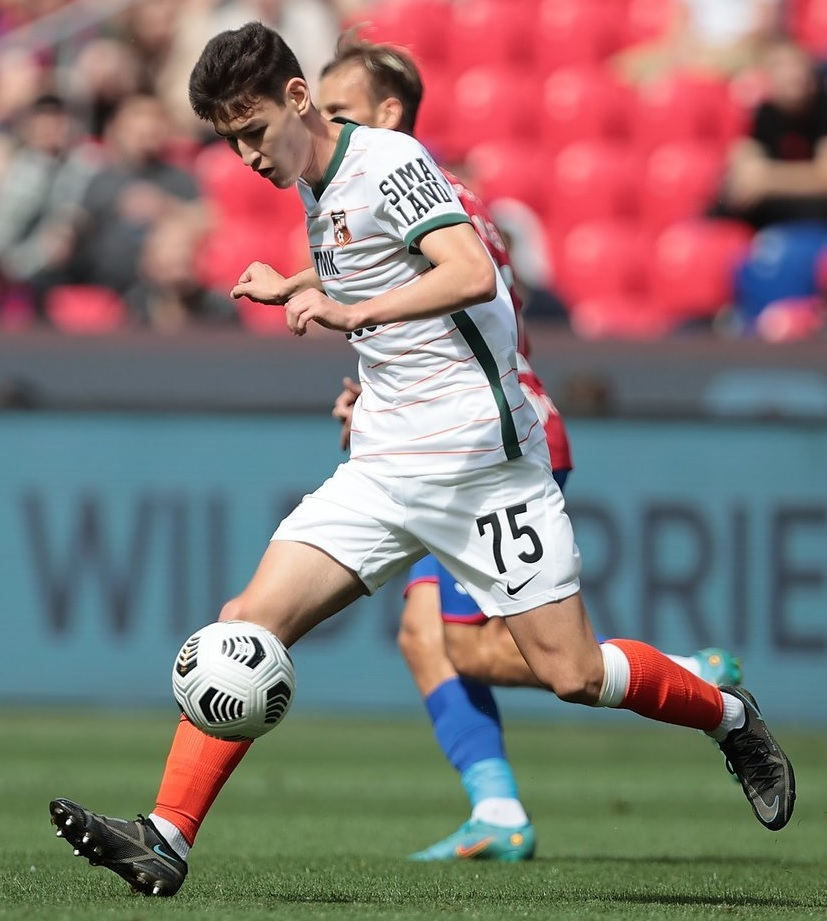
- Sungatulin with Ural Yekaterinburg in 2022

Personal information
- Full name: Fanil Ramayevich Sungatulin
- Date of birth: 24 December 2001 (age 24)
- Place of birth: Yarkovo, Russia
- Height: 1.77 m (5 ft 10 in)
- Position: Midfielder

Team information
- Current team: FC Ural Yekaterinburg
- Number: 6

Youth career
- FC Vagay
- FC Spartak Moscow

Senior career*
Years	Team	Apps	(Gls)
2018–2022	FC Spartak-2 Moscow	49	(1)
2021–2023	FC Spartak Moscow	1	(0)
2022–2023	→ FC Ural Yekaterinburg (loan)	13	(0)
2022–2023	→ FC Ural-2 Yekaterinburg (loan)	1	(0)
2023–	FC Ural Yekaterinburg	74	(0)

International career^{‡}
2016	Russia U15	4	(0)
2016–2017	Russia U16	12	(0)
2017–2018	Russia U17	10	(1)
- * Club domestic league appearances and goals as of 16 May 2026 ‡ National team caps and goals as of 2 March 2018

Fanil Ramayevich Sungatulin (Russian: Фаниль Рамаевич Сунгатулин; born 24 December 2001) is a Russian football player who plays for FC Ural Yekaterinburg.

== Club career ==
He made his debut in the Russian Football National League for FC Spartak-2 Moscow on 25 May 2019 in a game against PFC Sochi.

He made his debut in the Russian Premier League for FC Spartak Moscow on 21 May 2022 in a game against FC Khimki.

On 21 June 2022, Sungatullin joined FC Ural Yekaterinburg on loan. On 7 February 2023, the transfer to Ural was made permanent.

== Career statistics ==
As of 1 June 2024

Club	Season	League			Cup		Continental		Other		Total	
Club	Season	Division	Apps	Goals	Apps	Goals	Apps	Goals	Apps	Goals	Apps	Goals
Spartak-2 Moscow	2018–19	Russian First League	1	0	–		–		2 (Note: Appearances in the FNL Cup)	0	3	0
Spartak-2 Moscow	2020–21	Russian First League	16	0	–		–		–		16	0
Spartak-2 Moscow	2021–22	Russian First League	32	1	–		–		–		32	1
Spartak-2 Moscow	Total		49	1	0	0	0	0	2	0	51	1
Spartak Moscow	2021–22	Russian Premier League	1	0	0	0	0	0	–		1	0
Ural Yekaterinburg (loan)	2022–23	Russian Premier League	13	0	3	0	–		–		16	0
Ural-2 Yekaterinburg (loan)	2022–23	Russian Second League	1	0	–		–		–		1	0
Ural Yekaterinburg	2022–23	Russian Premier League	11	0	6	1	–		–		17	1
Ural Yekaterinburg	2023–24	Russian Premier League	8	0	8	0	–		0	0	16	0
Ural Yekaterinburg	Total		19	0	14	1	0	0	0	0	33	1
Career total			83	1	17	1	0	0	2	0	102	2
