= Daniil Khlusevich =

Russian footballer (born 2001)

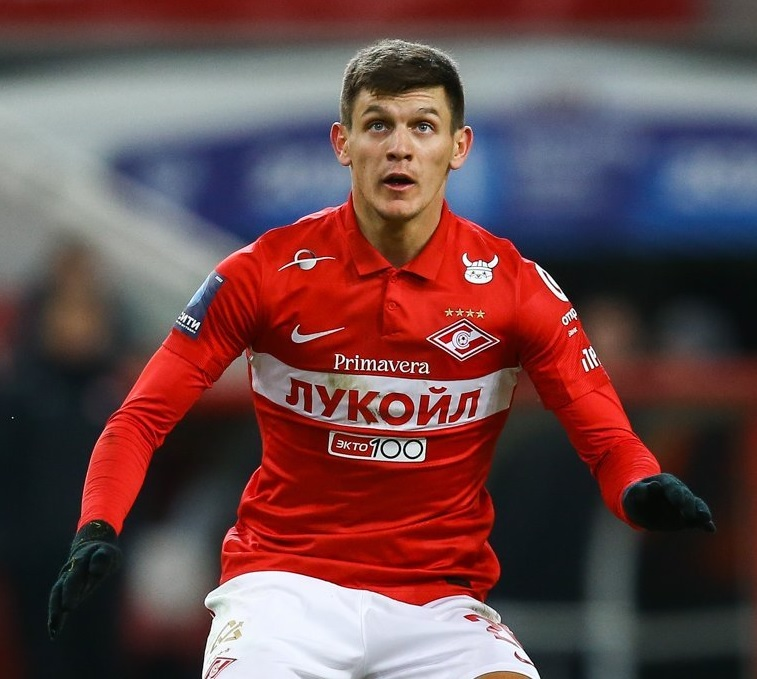
- Khlusevich with Spartak Moscow in 2022

Personal information
- Full name: Daniil Andreyevich Khlusevich
- Date of birth: 26 February 2001 (age 25)
- Place of birth: Simferopol, AR Crimea, Ukraine
- Height: 1.82 m (6 ft 0 in)
- Position: Midfielder

Team information
- Current team: Rostov
- Number: 26

Youth career
- 2009–2015: Krymteplytsia Molodizhne
- 2015–2016: UOR Simferopol
- 2016–2017: UOR Krasnolissia

Senior career*
Years	Team	Apps	(Gls)
2018–2021	Arsenal Tula	46	(8)
2022–2026	Spartak Moscow	75	(5)
2026	→ Akhmat Grozny (loan)	8	(0)
2026–	Rostov	5	(0)

International career^{‡}
2021	Russia U21	8	(3)
2022–	Russia	5	(0)
- * Club domestic league appearances and goals as of 20 November 2026 ‡ National team caps and goals as of 21 March 2024

Daniil Andreyevich Khlusevich (Russian: Даниил Андреевич Хлусевич; Ukrainian: Данило Андрійович Хлусевич; born 26 February 2001) is a professional footballer who plays as a right midfielder for Rostov. Born in Ukraine, he plays for the Russia national team.

== Club career ==
Khlusevich began and spent his youth career in Crimea, where he was born.

He made his debut for the main squad of Arsenal Tula, to which he moved in 2017, on 26 September 2018 in a Russian Cup game against Sakhalin.

Khlusevich made his Russian Premier League debut for Arsenal on 4 July 2020 in a game against Dynamo Moscow, replacing Aleksandr Lomovitsky in the 83rd minute. He made his first start in the next game against Krylia Sovetov Samara on 7 July 2020.

On 1 November 2021, he signed a 4.5-year contract with Spartak Moscow beginning on 1 January 2022. He won the Russian Cup on 29 May 2022. Khlusevich started the 2023–24 season by scoring two goals, including one in stoppage time, to achieve a 3–2 victory over Orenburg on 23 July 2023.

On 13 February 2026, Khlusevich moved on loan to Akhmat Grozny until the end of the 2025–26 season. He returned to Spartak at the end of the loan.

On 10 September 2026, Khlusevich signed with Rostov.

== International career ==
Khlusevich was called up to the Russia national football team for the first time for a friendly against Kyrgyzstan in September 2022. He made his debut in that game on 24 September 2022.

== Personal life ==
A Ukrainian citizen by birth, he acquired citizenship of Russia in 2014 after the annexation of Crimea from Ukraine.

== Career statistics ==
=== Club ===
As of match played 20 November 2026

Appearances and goals by club, season and competition
Club	Season	League			Cup		Other		Total	
Club	Season	Division	Apps	Goals	Apps	Goals	Apps	Goals	Apps	Goals
Arsenal Tula	2018–19	Russian Premier League	0	0	1	0	—		1	0
Arsenal Tula	2019–20	Russian Premier League	5	1	0	0	—		5	1
Arsenal Tula	2020–21	Russian Premier League	25	3	3	0	—		28	3
Arsenal Tula	2021–22	Russian Premier League	16	4	2	1	—		18	5
Arsenal Tula	Total		46	8	6	1	—		52	9
Spartak Moscow	2021–22	Russian Premier League	9	0	3	0	—		12	0
Spartak Moscow	2022–23	Russian Premier League	26	0	6	0	1 (Note: Appearance in Russian Super Cup)	0	33	0
Spartak Moscow	2023–24	Russian Premier League	24	5	10	0	—		34	5
Spartak Moscow	2024–25	Russian Premier League	13	0	5	0	—		18	0
Spartak Moscow	2025–26	Russian Premier League	3	0	7	1	—		10	1
Spartak Moscow	2026–27	Russian Premier League	0	0	1	0	—		1	0
Spartak Moscow	Total		75	5	32	1	1	0	108	6
Akhmat Grozny (loan)	2025–26	Russian Premier League	8	0	—		—		8	0
Rostov	2026–27	Russian Premier League	5	0	2	0	—		7	0
Career total			134	13	40	2	1	0	175	15

=== International ===
As of match played 21 March 2024

Appearances and goals by national team and year
National team	Year	Apps	Goals
Russia	2022	2	0
Russia	2023	2	0
Russia	2024	1	0
Total		5	0

== Honours ==
Spartak Moscow

- Russian Cup: 2021–22, 2025–26
