= Samuel Gigot =

French footballer (born 1993)

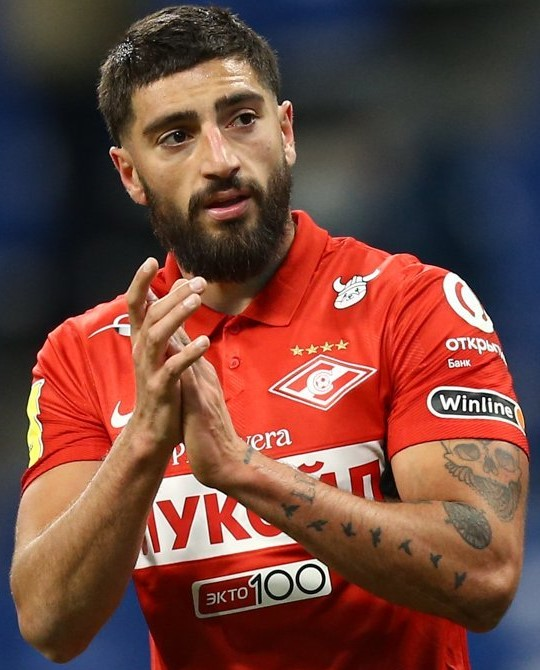
- Gigot with Spartak Moscow in 2022

Personal information
- Full name: Samuel Florent Thomas Gigot
- Date of birth: 12 October 1993 (age 33)
- Place of birth: Avignon, France
- Height: 1.87 m (6 ft 2 in)
- Positions: Centre-back; full-back

Youth career
- 1998–2003: MJC Avignon
- 2003–2010: Avignon
- 2010–2011: USP Grand Avignon
- 2011–2013: Arles-Avignon

Senior career*
Years	Team	Apps	(Gls)
2013–2015	Arles-Avignon B	17	(5)
2013–2015	Arles-Avignon	32	(4)
2015–2017	Kortrijk	41	(2)
2017–2018	Gent	37	(2)
2018–2022	Spartak Moscow	77	(9)
2022–2025	Marseille	47	(5)
2022	→ Spartak Moscow (loan)	11	(1)
2024–2025	→ Lazio (loan)	15	(2)
2025–2026	Lazio	0	(0)
- * Club domestic league appearances and goals as of 30 August 2026

Samuel Florent Thomas Gigot (French: [samɥɛl ʒiɡo]; born 12 October 1993) is a French professional footballer who plays as a centre-back or full-back.

== Career ==
Gigot is a youth product of Arles-Avignon. He made his Ligue 2 debut on 30 August 2013 in a match against Niort. On 15 August 2014, he scored his first league goal against Nancy.

On 4 June 2018, Gigot signed a four-year contract with Russian club Spartak Moscow, where he later became notable for his passion, and, despite being a defender, his willingness to join attacks. On 19 August 2019, he scored two goals in a 2–1 win over CSKA Moscow in the Main Moscow derby.

On 29 January 2022, Gigot signed for Ligue 1 club Marseille; he was loaned back to Spartak Moscow for the rest of the 2021–22 season. On 19 March 2022, he marked his 100th appearance for Spartak in all competitions during a 1–1 tie against FC Nizhny Novgorod. His last match for the team was a highly emotional 2–1 win over Dynamo Moscow on 29 May 2022 in the Russian Cup final.

His debut for Marseille in Ligue 1 was on 7 August 2022, when he started in a 4–1 victory over Reims. Gigot scored his first goal for the club in a 2–1 victory over LOSC Lille on 10 September 2022.

On 30 August 2024, just before the transfer window closed, Gigot joined Serie A club Lazio on loan for the 2024–25 season, with a conditional obligation to buy. The conditions were fulfilled and he joined Lazio on a permanent basis at the end of the season. After more than a season of not playing due to injuries, his Lazio contract was mutually terminated on 1 September 2026.

== Personal life ==
Gigot was born to a French family in Avignon. He was rumoured to be of Algerian descent through his mother, however he denied the information and said he has no links to Algeria.

His brother Tony is a former professional rugby league footballer.

== Career statistics ==
As of match played 18 May 2025

Appearances and goals by club, season and competition
Club	Season	League			National cup (Note: Includes Coupe de France, Belgian Cup, Russian Cup, Coppa Italia)		Europe		Other		Total	
Club	Season	Division	Apps	Goals	Apps	Goals	Apps	Goals	Apps	Goals	Apps	Goals
Arles-Avignon B	2013–14	CFA 2	14	3	–		–		–		14	3
Arles-Avignon B	2014–15	CFA 2	3	2	–		–		–		3	2
Arles-Avignon B	Total		17	5	–		–		–		17	5
Arles-Avignon	2013–14	Ligue 2	9	0	0	0	–		2 (Note: Appearances in Coupe de la Ligue)	0	11	0
Arles-Avignon	2014–15	Ligue 2	23	4	1	0	–		4	0	28	4
Arles-Avignon	Total		32	4	1	0	–		6	0	39	4
Kortrijk	2015–16	Belgian Pro League	21	0	3	0	–		7 (Note: Appearances in Belgian Pro League Europa League play-offs)	0	31	0
Kortrijk	2016–17	Belgian Pro League	20	2	2	0	–		–		22	2
Kortrijk	Total		41	2	5	0	–		7	0	53	2
Gent	2016–17	Belgian Pro League	7	0	–		4 (Note: Appearances in UEFA Europa League)	0	9 (Note: Appearances in Belgian Pro League championship play-offs)	0	20	0
Gent	2017–18	Belgian Pro League	30	2	2	0	2	0	10	0	44	2
Gent	Total		37	2	2	0	6	0	19	0	64	2
Spartak Moscow	2018–19	Russian Premier League	9	1	0	0	2 (Note: Appearances in UEFA Champions League)	0	–		11	1
Spartak Moscow	2019–20	Russian Premier League	26	4	4	0	4	0	–		34	4
Spartak Moscow	2020–21	Russian Premier League	26	3	1	0	–		–		27	3
Spartak Moscow	2021–22	Russian Premier League	27	2	3	0	8 (Note: Two appearances in UEFA Champions League, six appearances in UEFA Europa League)	0	–		38	2
Spartak Moscow	Total		88	10	8	0	14	0	–		110	10
Marseille	2022–23	Ligue 1	26	2	2	0	5	0	–		33	2
Marseille	2023–24	Ligue 1	21	3	2	0	10 (Note: Two appearances in UEFA Champions League, eight appearances in UEFA Europa League)	0	–		33	3
Marseille	Total		47	5	4	0	15	0	–		66	5
Lazio (loan)	2024–25	Serie A	15	2	2	0	6	0	–		23	2
Career total			277	30	22	0	41	0	32	0	372	30

== Honours ==
Spartak Moscow

- Russian Cup: 2021–22
