= Nail Umyarov =

Russian footballer

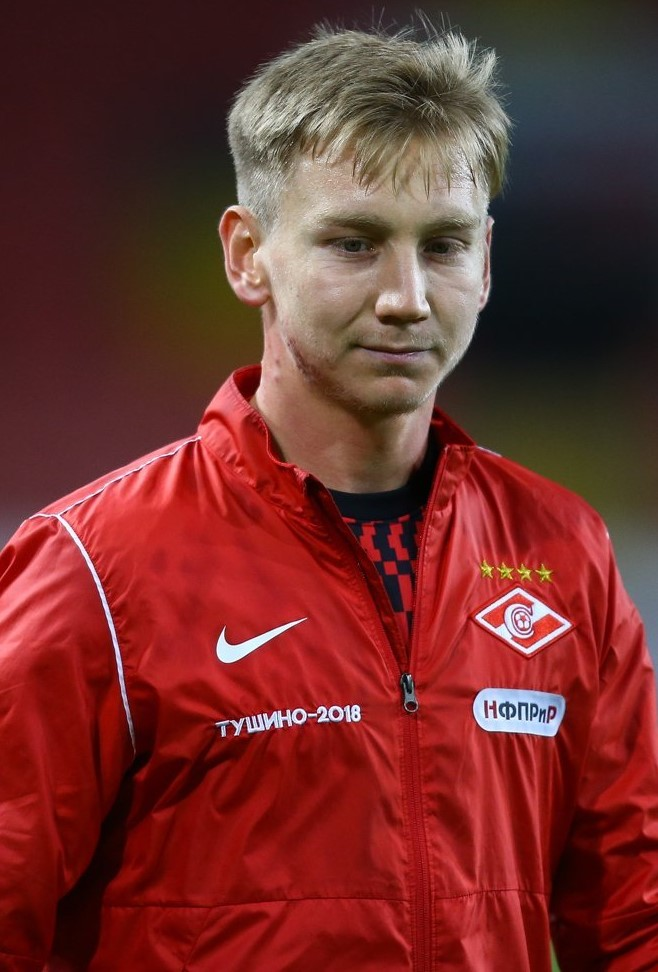
- Umyarov with Spartak Moscow in 2022

Personal information
- Full name: Nail Renadovich Umyarov
- Date of birth: 27 June 2000 (age 26)
- Place of birth: Syzran, Russia
- Height: 1.82 m (6 ft 0 in)
- Position: Defensive midfielder

Team information
- Current team: Spartak Moscow
- Number: 18

Youth career
- 2006–2009: Syzran-2003
- 2009–2011: Konoplyov football academy
- 2011–2016: Chertanovo Education Center

Senior career*
Years	Team	Apps	(Gls)
2017–2018	Chertanovo Moscow	38	(2)
2019–	Spartak Moscow	172	(4)
2019–2020	→ Spartak-2 Moscow	5	(0)

International career^{‡}
2015–2016	Russia U16	9	(1)
2016–2017	Russia U17	19	(5)
2017–2018	Russia U18	8	(0)
2018–2019	Russia U19	9	(1)
2019–2021	Russia U21	19	(1)
2025–	Russia	8	(0)
- * Club domestic league appearances and goals as of 22 November 2026 ‡ National team caps and goals as of 3 October 2026

Nail Renadovich Umyarov (Russian: Наиль Ренадович Умяров; Tatar: Наил Ренад улы Үмәров; born 27 June 2000) is a Russian football player who plays as a defensive midfielder for Spartak Moscow and the Russia national team.

== Club career ==
Umyarov made his debut in the Russian Professional Football League for Chertanovo Moscow on 3 August 2017 in a game against Dynamo-2 Saint Petersburg.

On 8 January 2019, FC Spartak Moscow officially announced that Umyarov signed the contract with the club.

He made his Russian Premier League debut for Spartak on 17 March 2019 in a game against FC Zenit Saint Petersburg.

On 27 October 2021, he extended his contract with Spartak until the end of the 2025–26 season.

On 8 August 2025, Umyarov extended his Spartak contract to 2029.

== International career ==
Umyarov was first called up to the Russia national team in October 2025 for friendlies. He made his debut on 10 October 2025 in a friendly against Iran.

== Career statistics ==
=== Club ===
As of match played 22 November 2026

Appearances and goals by club, season and competition
Club	Season	League			Cup		Europe		Other		Total	
Club	Season	Division	Apps	Goals	Apps	Goals	Apps	Goals	Apps	Goals	Apps	Goals
Chertanovo Moscow	2017–18	Russian Second League	18	0	1	0	—		5 (Note: Appearances in the FNL Cup)	0	24	0
Chertanovo Moscow	2018–19	Russian First League	20	2	1	0	—		—		21	2
Chertanovo Moscow	Total		38	2	2	0	—		5	0	45	2
Spartak Moscow	2018–19	Russian Premier League	5	0	0	0	—		—		5	0
Spartak Moscow	2019–20	Russian Premier League	17	0	2	0	2 (Note: Appearances in the UEFA Europa League)	0	—		21	0
Spartak Moscow	2020–21	Russian Premier League	26	0	3	0	—		—		29	0
Spartak Moscow	2021–22	Russian Premier League	17	1	2	0	7 (Note: Two appearances in the UEFA Champions League, five appearances in the UEFA Europa League)	0	—		26	1
Spartak Moscow	2022–23	Russian Premier League	12	0	3	0	—		1 (Note: Appearances in the Russian Super Cup)	0	16	0
Spartak Moscow	2023–24	Russian Premier League	23	0	11	0	—		—		34	0
Spartak Moscow	2024–25	Russian Premier League	28	3	6	0	—		—		34	3
Spartak Moscow	2025–26	Russian Premier League	29	0	10	0	—		—		39	0
Spartak Moscow	2026–27	Russian Premier League	15	0	4	1	—		1	0	20	1
Spartak Moscow	Total		172	4	41	1	9	0	2	0	224	5
Spartak-2 Moscow	2018–19	Russian First League	1	0	—		—		4	0	5	0
Spartak-2 Moscow	2019–20	Russian First League	4	0	—		—		—		4	0
Spartak-2 Moscow	Total		5	0	—		—		4	0	9	0
Career total			215	6	43	1	9	0	11	0	278	7

=== International ===
As of match played 3 October 2026

Appearances and goals by national team and year
National team	Year	Apps	Goals
Russia	2025	4	0
Russia	2026	4	0
Total		8	0

== Honours ==
Spartak Moscow

- Russian Cup: 2021–22, 2025–26
