= Ilya Svinov =

Russian footballer

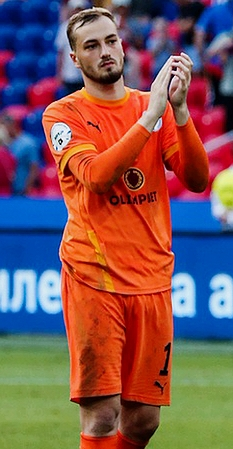

Personal information
- Full name: Ilya Yevgenyevich Svinov
- Date of birth: 25 September 2000 (age 26)
- Place of birth: Tolyatti, Russia
- Height: 1.93 m (6 ft 4 in)
- Position: Goalkeeper

Team information
- Current team: Rodina Moscow
- Number: 71

Senior career*
Years	Team	Apps	(Gls)
2017–2019	Lada-Tolyatti	6	(0)
2019–2021	Nosta Novotroitsk	34	(0)
2021	Fakel Voronezh	24	(0)
2022–2024	Spartak Moscow	2	(0)
2022	→ Spartak-2 Moscow	3	(0)
2022–2023	→ Fakel Voronezh (loan)	24	(0)
2024–2025	Baltika Kaliningrad	5	(0)
2025	→ Ufa (loan)	1	(0)
2025–	Rodina Moscow	2	(0)
- * Club domestic league appearances and goals as of 16 May 2026

Ilya Yevgenyevich Svinov (Russian: Илья Евгеньевич Свинов; born 25 September 2000) is a Russian football player who plays for Rodina Moscow.

== Club career ==
He made his debut in the Russian Football National League for Fakel Voronezh on 10 July 2021 in a game against Baltika Kaliningrad.

On 4 December 2021, he signed a contract with Spartak Moscow until 31 May 2025, with the club option to extend for an additional year.

On 6 June 2022, he returned to Fakel Voronezh on a one-year loan deal. Svinov made his Russian Premier League debut for Fakel on 6 August 2022 against CSKA Moscow.

On 8 July 2024, Svinov signed a two-year contract with Russian First League side Baltika Kaliningrad.

== Career statistics ==
As of match played 16 May 2026

Appearances and goals by club, season and competition
Club	Season	League			Cup		Other		Total	
Club	Season	Division	Apps	Goals	Apps	Goals	Apps	Goals	Apps	Goals
Lada-Tolyatti	2017–18	Russian Second League	1	0	0	0	–		1	0
Lada-Tolyatti	2018–19	Russian Second League	5	0	0	0	–		5	0
Lada-Tolyatti	Total		6	0	0	0	0	0	6	0
Nosta Novotroitsk	2018–19	Russian Second League	1	0	–		–		1	0
Nosta Novotroitsk	2019–20	Russian Second League	8	0	1	0	–		9	0
Nosta Novotroitsk	2020–21	Russian Second League	25	0	0	0	–		25	0
Nosta Novotroitsk	Total		34	0	1	0	0	0	35	0
Fakel Voronezh	2021–22	Russian First League	24	0	0	0	–		24	0
Spartak Moscow	2021–22	Russian Premier League	0	0	0	0	–		0	0
Spartak Moscow	2023–24	Russian Premier League	2	0	1	0	–		3	0
Spartak Moscow	Total		2	0	1	0	0	0	3	0
Spartak-2 Moscow	2021–22	Russian First League	3	0	–		–		3	0
Fakel Voronezh (loan)	2022–23	Russian Premier League	24	0	1	0	2 (Note: Appearance(s) in relegation play-offs)	0	27	0
Baltika Kaliningrad	2024–25	Russian First League	5	0	0	0	–		5	0
Ufa (loan)	2024–25	Russian First League	1	0	0	0	–		1	0
Rodina Moscow	2025–26	Russian First League	2	0	0	0	–		2	0
Career total			101	0	3	0	2	0	106	0
