= Zelimkhan Bakayev =

Russian footballer (born 1996)

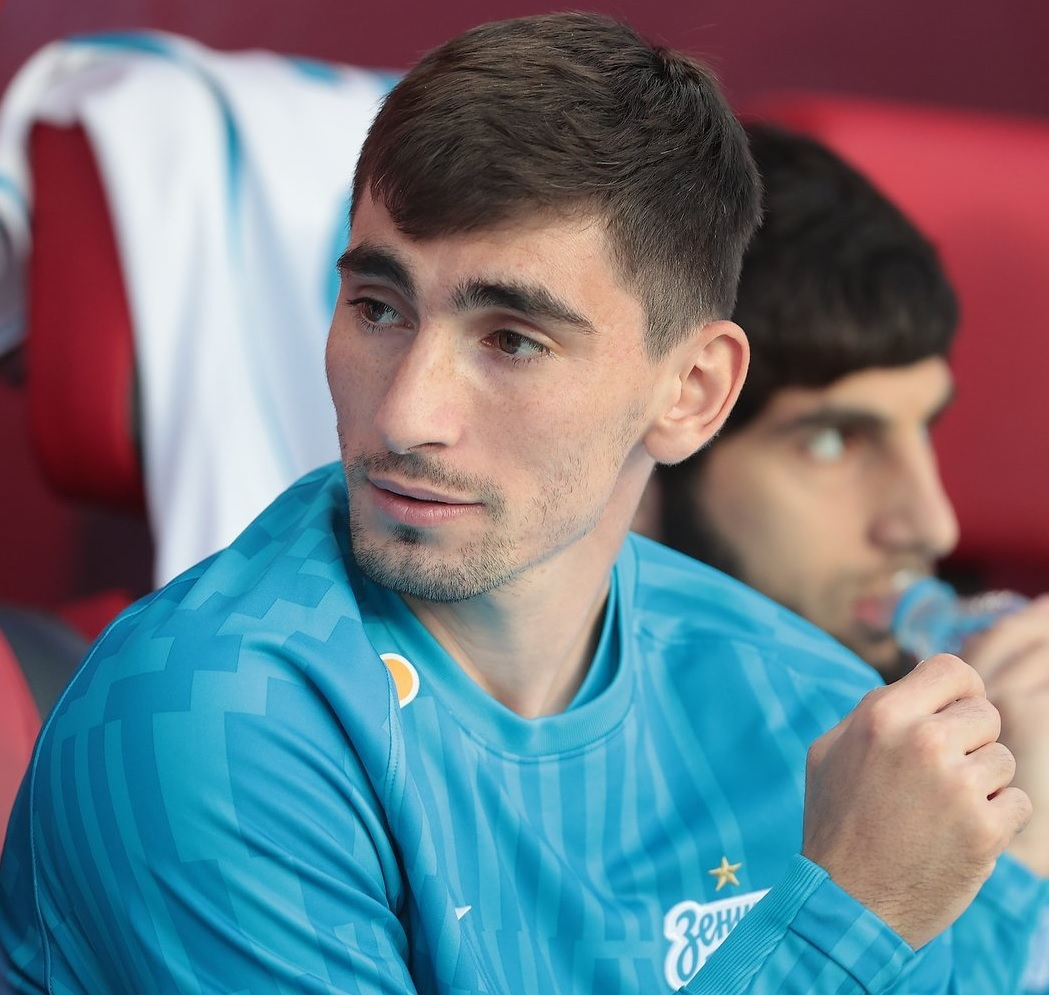
- Bakayev with Zenit in 2022

Personal information
- Full name: Zelimkhan Dzhabrailovich Bakayev
- Date of birth: 1 July 1996 (age 30)
- Place of birth: Nazran, Ingushetia, Russia
- Height: 1.80 m (5 ft 11 in)
- Position: Midfielder

Team information
- Current team: Lokomotiv Moscow
- Number: 7

Youth career
- 2007–2016: Spartak Moscow

Senior career*
Years	Team	Apps	(Gls)
2014–2018	Spartak-2 Moscow	52	(4)
2015–2022	Spartak Moscow	81	(7)
2018–2019	→ Arsenal Tula (loan)	25	(8)
2022–2025	Zenit Saint Petersburg	21	(1)
2023–2024	→ Al Wahda (loan)	19	(1)
2024–2025	→ Khimki (loan)	25	(4)
2025–	Lokomotiv Moscow	40	(4)

International career^{‡}
2016–2018	Russia U21	15	(6)
2019–	Russia	16	(2)
- * Club domestic league appearances and goals as of 22 November 2026 ‡ National team caps and goals as of 10 October 2025

Zelimkhan Dzhabrailovich Bakayev (Russian: Зелимхан Джабраилович Бакаев; born 1 July 1996) is a Russian footballer who plays as a midfielder for Lokomotiv Moscow and the Russia national team.

== Club career ==
He made his debut in the Russian Professional Football League for FC Spartak-2 Moscow on 26 April 2014 in a game against FC Metallurg Vyksa.

He made his debut for the main squad of FC Spartak Moscow on 23 September 2015 in a Russian Cup game against FC Volga Nizhny Novgorod. He made his Russian Premier League debut for Spartak on 23 July 2017 as a starter in a game against FC Ufa.

On 1 August 2018, he joined FC Arsenal Tula on loan for the 2018–19 season.

Upon his return from loan, he scored his first two goals for Spartak on 8 August 2019 in an away Europa League qualifier against FC Thun. 3 days later, he scored his first two Russian Premier League goals for Spartak in a 3–1 victory over FC Akhmat Grozny.

Bakayev left Spartak as a free agent on 1 June 2022.

On 15 June 2022, Bakayev signed a contract with FC Zenit Saint Petersburg for three years with an option for the fourth year.

On 19 September 2023, Bakayev was loaned to Emirati club Al Wahda for a season.

On 2 August 2024, Bakayev moved on loan to Khimki.

On 19 June 2025, Bakayev signed a two-year contract with Lokomotiv Moscow. On 14 April 2026, he extended his Lokomotiv contract to 2029.

== International ==
He was first called up to Russia national football team for UEFA Euro 2020 qualifying matches against San Marino and Cyprus in June 2019. He made his debut on 13 October 2019 in a Euro 2020 qualifier against Cyprus. He substituted Aleksei Ionov in the 78th minute and participated in one of the three goals Russia scored in the remaining time.

He scored his first international goal on 7 September 2021 in a World Cup qualifier against Malta, establishing the final score of 2–0 at home from the penalty spot.

== Career statistics ==
=== Club ===
As of match played 22 November 2026

Appearances and goals by club, season and competition
Club	Season	League			National cup		League cup		Continental		Other		Total	
Club	Season	Division	Apps	Goals	Apps	Goals	Apps	Goals	Apps	Goals	Apps	Goals	Apps	Goals
Spartak-2 Moscow	2013–14	Russian Second League	1	0	—		—		—		—		1	0
Spartak-2 Moscow	2015–16	Russian First League	10	1	—		—		—		—		10	1
Spartak-2 Moscow	2016–17	Russian First League	31	0	—		—		—		4 (Note: Appearances in the FNL Cup)	1	35	1
Spartak-2 Moscow	2017–18	Russian First League	10	3	—		—		—		—		10	3
Spartak-2 Moscow	Total		52	4	0	0	—		0	0	4	1	56	5
Spartak Moscow	2015–16	Russian Premier League	0	0	2	0	—		—		—		2	0
Spartak Moscow	2017–18	Russian Premier League	5	0	1	0	—		0	0	0	0	6	0
Spartak Moscow	2019–20	Russian Premier League	27	6	4	1	—		4 (Note: Appearances in the UEFA Europa League)	3	—		35	10
Spartak Moscow	2020–21	Russian Premier League	23	1	3	0	—		—		—		26	1
Spartak Moscow	2021–22	Russian Premier League	26	0	3	2	—		7 (Note: Two appearances in the UEFA Champions League, five appearances, one goal in the UEFA Europa League)	1	—		36	3
Spartak Moscow	Total		81	7	13	3	—		11	4	0	0	105	14
Arsenal Tula (loan)	2018–19	Russian Premier League	25	8	4	0	—		—		—		29	8
Zenit Saint Petersburg	2022–23	Russian Premier League	17	1	7	1	—		—		1 (Note: Appearances in the Russian Super Cup)	0	25	2
Zenit Saint Petersburg	2023–24	Russian Premier League	4	0	3	0	—		—		1	0	8	0
Zenit Saint Petersburg	Total		21	1	10	1	—		—		2	0	33	2
Al Wahda	2023–24	UAE Pro League	19	1	0	0	5	0	0	0	0	0	24	1
Khimki	2024–25	Russian Premier League	25	4	3	2	—		—		—		28	6
Lokomotiv Moscow	2025–26	Russian Premier League	25	3	9	0	—		—		—		34	3
Lokomotiv Moscow	2026–27	Russian Premier League	15	1	4	0	—		—		—		19	1
Lokomotiv Moscow	Total		40	4	13	0	0	0	0	0	0	0	53	4
Career total			263	29	43	6	5	0	11	4	6	1	328	40

=== International ===
As of match played 10 October 2025

Appearances and goals by national team and year
National team	Year	Apps	Goals
Russia	2019	3	0
Russia	2020	3	0
Russia	2021	6	1
Russia	2022	1	0
Russia	2025	3	1
Total		16	2

Scores and results list Russia's goal tally first.

No.	Date	Venue	Opponent	Score	Result	Competition
1.	7 September 2021	Otkritie Arena, Moscow, Russia	Malta	2–0	2–0	2022 FIFA World Cup qualification
2.	19 March 2025	VTB Arena, Moscow, Russia	Grenada	5–0	5–0	Friendly

== Honors ==
=== Club ===
Spartak Moscow

- Russian Cup: 2021–22
- Russian Super Cup: 2017

Zenit St. Petersburg

- Russian Premier League: 2022–23, 2023–24
- Russian Cup: 2023–24
- Russian Super Cup: 2022, 2023

Al Wahda

- UAE League Cup: 2023–24

== Personal life ==
His younger brother Soltmurad Bakayev is also a footballer. Bakayev is an ethnic Ingush.
