= Aleksandr Lomovitsky =

Russian footballer (born 1998)

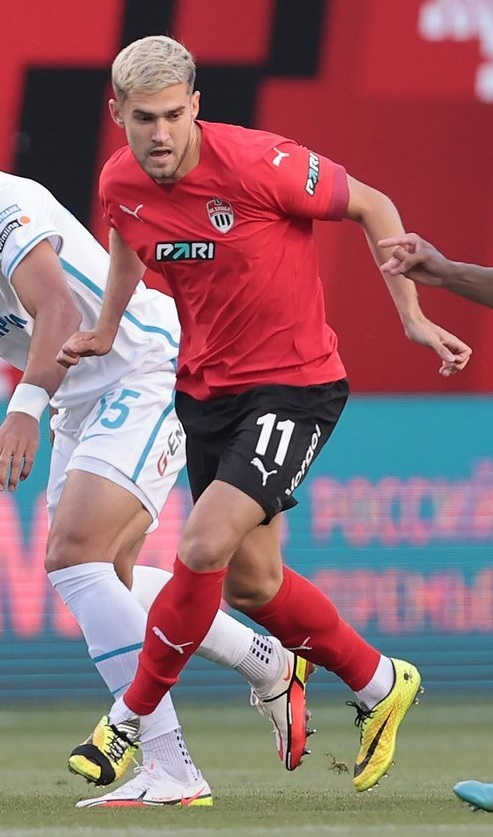
- Lomovitsky with Khimki in 2022

Personal information
- Full name: Aleksandr Yevgenyevich Lomovitsky
- Date of birth: 27 January 1998 (age 28)
- Place of birth: Moscow, Russia
- Height: 1.81 m (5 ft 11 in)
- Position: Winger

Team information
- Current team: FC Torpedo-BelAZ Zhodino
- Number: 11

Youth career
- –2017: FC Spartak Moscow

Senior career*
Years	Team	Apps	(Gls)
2017–2019	FC Spartak-2 Moscow	36	(4)
2017–2021	FC Spartak Moscow	32	(0)
2019–2020	→ FC Arsenal Tula (loan)	24	(2)
2020	→ FC Khimki (loan)	8	(2)
2020–2021	→ FC Arsenal Tula (loan)	18	(2)
2022–2026	FC Rubin Kazan	33	(1)
2022	→ FC Khimki (loan)	15	(1)
2025	→ FC Fakel Voronezh (loan)	9	(0)
2026–	FC Torpedo-BelAZ Zhodino	5	(1)

International career^{‡}
2013–2014	Russia U16	6	(0)
2014–2015	Russia U17	28	(2)
2015–2016	Russia U18	12	(4)
2016	Russia U19	6	(2)
2019–2021	Russia U21	17	(2)
- * Club domestic league appearances and goals as of 5 September 2026 ‡ National team caps and goals as of 31 March 2021

Aleksandr Yevgenyevich Lomovitsky (Russian: Александр Евгеньевич Ломовицкий; born 27 January 1998) is a Russian football player who plays for Belarusian Premier League club FC Torpedo-BelAZ Zhodino. He is a winger who can play on the right or left side.

== Club career ==
He made his debut in the Russian Football National League for FC Spartak-2 Moscow on 8 July 2017 in a game against FC Sibir Novosibirsk.

He made his debut in the Russian Premier League for FC Spartak Moscow on 28 July 2018 in a game against FC Orenburg.

On 26 July 2019, he joined FC Arsenal Tula on loan for the 2019–20 season.

On 12 August 2020, he moved on loan to FC Khimki for the 2020–21 season. On 1 October 2020, he was recalled from the Khimki loan and re-joined FC Arsenal Tula on another loan.

On 29 December 2021, he signed a 4.5-year contract with FC Rubin Kazan. On 14 July 2022, Lomovitsky returned on loan to FC Khimki. On 27 January 2025, Lomovitsky was loaned to FC Fakel Voronezh. He left Rubin as his contract expired in May 2026.

== International ==
He was included in the Russia national under-17 football team for the 2015 UEFA European Under-17 Championship and 2015 FIFA U-17 World Cup.

== Career statistics ==
As of match played 12 August 2025

Appearances and goals by club, season and competition
Club	Season	League			Cup		Europe		Other		Total	
Club	Season	Division	Apps	Goals	Apps	Goals	Apps	Goals	Apps	Goals	Apps	Goals
Spartak-2 Moscow	2016–17	Russian First League	0	0	—		—		3 (Note: Appearances in the FNL Cup)	1	3	1
Spartak-2 Moscow	2017–18	Russian First League	34	4	—		—		5	1	39	5
Spartak-2 Moscow	2018–19	Russian First League	2	0	—		—		—		2	0
Spartak-2 Moscow	Total		36	4	—		—		8	2	44	6
Spartak Moscow	2017–18	Russian Premier League	0	0	0	0	0	0	0	0	0	0
Spartak Moscow	2018–19	Russian Premier League	17	0	2	0	5 (Note: One appearance in the UEFA Champions League, four appearances in the UEFA Europa League)	0	—		24	0
Spartak Moscow	2019–20	Russian Premier League	1	0	—		—		—		1	0
Spartak Moscow	2021–22	Russian Premier League	14	0	0	0	7 (Note: One appearance in the UEFA Champions League, six appearances in the UEFA Europa League)	0	—		21	0
Spartak Moscow	Total		32	0	2	0	12	0	0	0	46	0
Arsenal Tula (loan)	2019–20	Russian Premier League	24	2	2	0	—		—		26	2
Khimki (loan)	2020–21	Russian Premier League	8	2	0	0	—		—		8	2
Arsenal Tula (loan)	2020–21	Russian Premier League	18	2	3	0	—		—		21	2
Rubin Kazan	2021–22	Russian Premier League	11	1	2	0	—		—		13	1
Rubin Kazan	2022–23	Russian First League	8	0	—		—		—		8	0
Rubin Kazan	2023–24	Russian Premier League	14	0	3	0	—		—		17	0
Rubin Kazan	2024–25	Russian Premier League	0	0	3	0	—		—		3	0
Rubin Kazan	2025–26	Russian Premier League	0	0	1	0	—		—		1	0
Rubin Kazan	Total		33	1	9	0	—		—		42	1
Khimki (loan)	2022–23	Russian Premier League	15	1	4	0	—		—		19	1
Fakel Voronezh (loan)	2024–25	Russian Premier League	9	0	—		—		—		9	0
Career total			175	12	20	0	12	0	8	2	215	14
