= Ilya Golosov (footballer) =

Russian footballer

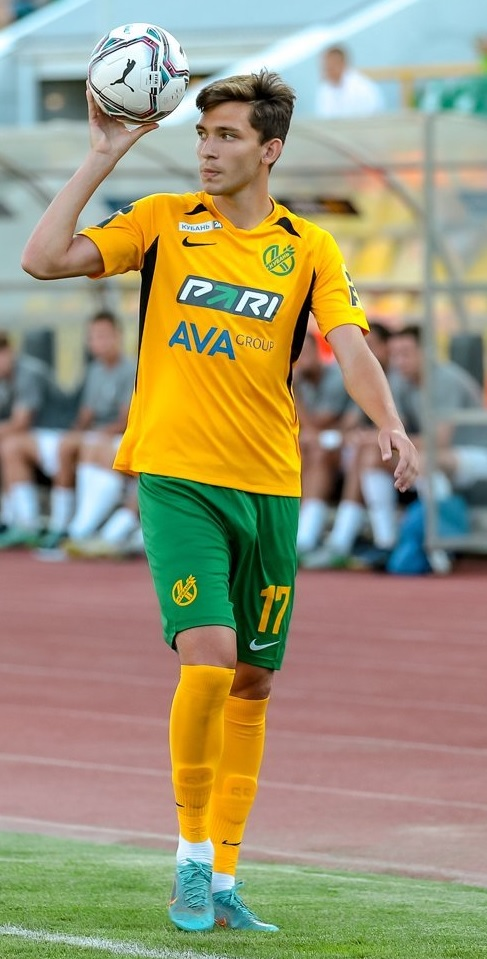
- Golosov with Kuban Krasnodar in 2022

Personal information
- Full name: Ilya Yevgenyevich Golosov
- Date of birth: 9 August 2001 (age 25)
- Place of birth: Rostov-on-Don, Russia
- Height: 1.86 m (6 ft 1 in)
- Position: Left-back

Youth career
- FC Lokomotiv Moscow

Senior career*
Years	Team	Apps	(Gls)
2019–2023	FC Spartak Moscow	2	(0)
2020–2021	→ FC Spartak-2 Moscow	9	(0)
2021–2022	→ FC Rotor Volgograd (loan)	16	(0)
2021–2022	→ FC Rotor-2 Volgograd (loan)	4	(0)
2022–2023	→ FC Kuban Krasnodar (loan)	5	(0)
2023–2024	FC Arsenal-2 Tula	12	(0)
2023–2024	FC Arsenal Tula	2	(0)
- * Club domestic league appearances and goals as of 25 May 2024

Ilya Yevgenyevich Golosov (Russian: Илья Евгеньевич Голосов; born 9 August 2001) is a Russian football player who plays as a left-back.

== Club career ==
He made his debut in the Russian Football National League for FC Spartak-2 Moscow on 9 March 2020 in a game against FC Tekstilshchik Ivanovo. He started the game and was substituted at half-time.

He made his Russian Premier League debut for FC Spartak Moscow on 27 June 2020 in a game against FC Ufa, replacing Andrey Yeshchenko in the 84th minute.

On 22 July 2021, he joined FC Rotor Volgograd on loan for the 2021–22 season.

On 28 June 2022, Golosov was loaned to FC Kuban Krasnodar for the 2022–23 season.

On 18 August 2023, Golosov signed with FC Arsenal Tula.
