= Mikhail Ignatov =

Russian footballer (born 2000)

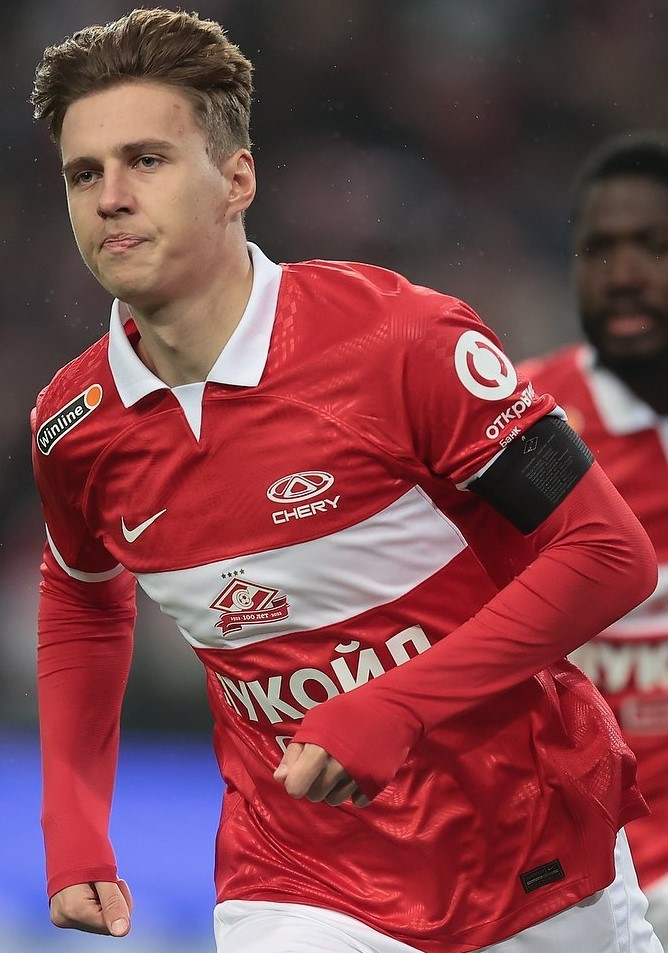
- Ignatov with Spartak Moscow in 2022

Personal information
- Full name: Mikhail Aleksandrovich Ignatov
- Date of birth: 4 May 2000 (age 26)
- Place of birth: Moscow, Russia
- Height: 1.87 m (6 ft 2 in)
- Position: Midfielder

Team information
- Current team: Sochi
- Number: 8

Youth career
- 2007–2014: CSKA Moscow
- 2014–2019: Spartak Moscow

Senior career*
Years	Team	Apps	(Gls)
2018–2022	Spartak-2 Moscow	55	(12)
2018–2025	Spartak Moscow	89	(5)
2025–	Sochi	25	(3)

International career^{‡}
2016	Russia U16	5	(1)
2016	Russia U17	5	(0)
2017	Russia U18	5	(0)
2018	Russia U19	6	(0)
2019	Russia U20	2	(0)
2020–2021	Russia U21	8	(1)
- * Club domestic league appearances and goals as of 17 May 2026 ‡ National team caps and goals as of 12 October 2021

Mikhail Aleksandrovich Ignatov (Russian: Михаил Александрович Игнатов; born 4 May 2000) is a Russian football player who plays as an attacking midfielder for Sochi.

== Club career ==
Ignatov made his debut in the Russian Football National League for Spartak-2 Moscow on 5 March 2018 in a game against Fakel Voronezh.

He made his debut for the main squad of Spartak Moscow on 20 September 2018 in a Europa League game against Rapid Wien.

Ignatov made his Russian Premier League debut in Spartak's next game on 23 September 2018 against CSKA Moscow. In his next league game for Spartak and first as a starter, he scored his first goal in a 3–2 victory over Yenisey Krasnoyarsk on 7 October 2018.

On 21 January 2022, he extended his contract with Spartak until June 2025. Ignatov left the club on 1 June 2025 as his contract expired.

On 9 July 2025, Ignatov signed a three-year contract with Sochi.

== Career statistics ==
As of match played 17 May 2026

Appearances and goals by club, season and competition
Club	Season	League			Cup		Europe		Other		Total	
Club	Season	Division	Apps	Goals	Apps	Goals	Apps	Goals	Apps	Goals	Apps	Goals
Spartak-2 Moscow	2017–18	Russian First League	1	0	—		—		—		1	0
Spartak-2 Moscow	2018–19	Russian First League	7	0	—		—		—		7	0
Spartak-2 Moscow	2019–20	Russian First League	16	1	—		—		—		16	1
Spartak-2 Moscow	2020–21	Russian First League	30	11	—		—		—		30	11
Spartak-2 Moscow	2021–22	Russian First League	1	0	—		—		—		1	0
Spartak-2 Moscow	Total		55	12	—		—		—		55	12
Spartak Moscow	2017–18	Russian Premier League	0	0	0	0	0	0	—		0	0
Spartak Moscow	2018–19	Russian Premier League	8	1	1	0	3 (Note: Appearances in the UEFA Europa League)	0	—		12	1
Spartak Moscow	2019–20	Russian Premier League	1	0	0	0	0	0	—		1	0
Spartak Moscow	2020–21	Russian Premier League	2	0	1	0	—		—		3	0
Spartak Moscow	2021–22	Russian Premier League	24	0	4	0	7 (Note: Two appearances in the UEFA Champions League, five appearances, one goal in the UEFA Europa League)	1	—		35	1
Spartak Moscow	2022–23	Russian Premier League	21	2	9	1	—		1 (Note: Appearances in the Russian Super Cup)	0	31	3
Spartak Moscow	2023–24	Russian Premier League	24	2	11	2	—		—		35	4
Spartak Moscow	2024–25	Russian Premier League	9	0	6	0	—		—		15	0
Spartak Moscow	Total		89	5	32	3	10	1	1	0	132	9
Sochi	2025–26	Russian Premier League	25	3	3	1	—		—		28	4
Career total			169	20	35	4	10	1	1	0	215	25

== Honours ==
Spartak Moscow

- Russian Cup: 2021–22
