= 2024–25 Antalyaspor season =

Antalyaspor
2024–25 season
- Manager: Alex
- Stadium: Antalya Stadium
- Süper Lig: 7th
- Turkish Cup: Pre-season
- Top goalscorer: League: Braian Samudio (2); All: Braian Samudio (2)
- Average home league attendance: 7,996
Home colours	Away colours	Third colours

The 2024–25 season is the 59th season in the history of Antalyaspor, and the club's 10th consecutive season in Süper Lig. In addition to the domestic league, the team is scheduled to participate in the Turkish Cup.

== Transfers ==
=== In ===
Pos.	Player	Transferred from	Fee	Date	Source
MF	(Turkey) Soner Dikmen	(Turkey) Konyaspor	Free	6 July 2024	
GK	(Bosnia and Herzegovina) Kenan Pirić	(Cyprus) AEK Larnaca	Free	6 July 2024	
MF	(Mali) Moussa Djenepo	(Belgium) Standard Liège	Loan	12 July 2024	
DF	(Brazil) Thalisson	(Romania) Universitatea Cluj	€280,000	17 July 2024	
FW	(Paraguay) Braian Samudio	(Mexico) Toluca	Undisclosed	28 July 2024	

=== Out ===
Pos.	Player	Transferred to	Fee	Date	Source
FW	(Democratic Republic of the Congo) Britt Assombalonga	(Turkey) Amed	End of contract	1 July 2024	

== Friendlies ==
=== Pre-season ===
8 July 2024 Friendly	Antalyaspor (Turkey)	0–4	(Russia) Akron Tolyatti	Burdur
11:15 UTC+3			Bardybakhin 8'; Gribov 34'; Bakaev 37'; Boldyrev 55'	Stadium: Makü İstiklal Stadı
Note: 2 x 35 minutes

14 July 2024 Friendly	Antalyaspor (Turkey)	2–3	(Russia) Akron Tolyatti	Burdur
18:00 UTC+3	Van de Streek 59'; Sarı 85'		Eldarushev 2'; Paulo Vitor 11'; Đurasović 90+2'	Stadium: Makü İstiklal Stadı

18 July 2024 Friendly	Antalyaspor (Turkey)	1–2	(Qatar) Al-Khor SC
18:00 UTC+3

25 July 2024 Friendly	Antalyaspor (Turkey)	0–1	(Turkey) Sivasspor
15:00			Menig 41'

== Competitions ==
=== Overall record ===
Competition	First match	Last match	Starting round	Record							
Competition	First match	Last match	Starting round	Pld	W	D	L	GF	GA	GD	Win %
Süper Lig	10 August 2024	1 June 2025	Matchday 1	6	2	2	2	9	12	−3	33.33
Turkish Cup				0	0	0	0	0	0	+0	—
Total				6	2	2	2	9	12	−3	33.33

Last updated: 22 September 2024
Source: Soccerway

=== Süper Lig ===
==== League table ====
Pos	Team	Pld	W	D	L	GF	GA	GD	Pts	Qualification or relegation
13	Alanyaspor	36	12	9	15	43	50	−7	45	
14	Kayserispor	36	11	12	13	45	57	−12	45	
15	Antalyaspor	36	12	8	16	37	62	−25	44	
16	Bodrum (R)	36	9	10	17	26	43	−17	37	Relegation to 2025–26 TFF First League
17	Sivasspor (R)	36	9	8	19	44	60	−16	35	Relegation to 2025–26 TFF First League

Source: Süper Lig
Rules for classification: 1) Points; 2) Head-to-head points; 3) Head-to-head goal difference; 4) Head-to-head goals scored; 5) Goal difference; 6) Goals scored; 7) Play-off.
(Note: Head-to-head record is used only after all the matches between the teams in question have been played)
(R) Relegated

==== Results summary ====
Overall								Home						Away					
Pld	W	D	L	GF	GA	GD	Pts	W	D	L	GF	GA	GD	W	D	L	GF	GA	GD
0	0	0	0	0	0	0	0	0	0	0	0	0	0	0	0	0	0	0	0

Source: Süper Lig

==== Results by round ====
Round	1	2	3	4	5	6	7
Ground	H	A	H	A	H	A	H
Result	D	L	W	L	W	D	
Position	10	16	8	11	9	10	

Updated to match(es) played on 22 September 2024. Source: Süper Lig
A = Away; H = Home; W = Win; D = Draw; L = Loss

==== Matches ====
The match schedule was released on 11 July 2024.

10 August 2024 1	Antalyaspor	0–0	Göztepe	Antalya
21:45				Stadium: Antalya Stadium

18 August 2024 2	Beşiktaş	4–2	Antalyaspor	Beşiktaş
21:45 UTC+3	Immobile 13', 23'; Silva 56'; Muçi 90+5'		Samudio 1', 51'	Stadium: Beşiktaş Stadium; Attendance: 32,966; Referee: Mehmet Türkmen

25 August 2024 3	Antalyaspor	3–2	Hatayspor	Antalya
21:45				Stadium: Antalya Stadium

16 September 2024 5	Antalyaspor	2–1	Adana Demirspor	Antalya
20:00				Stadium: Antalya Stadium

29 September 2024 7	Antalyaspor	v	Fenerbahçe	Antalya
19:00 UTC+3				Stadium: Antalya Stadium
