= 2024–25 FC Akron Tolyatti season =

FC Akron Tolyatti
2024–25 season
- Manager: Zaur Tedeyev
- Stadium: Kristall Stadion Zhigulevsk
- Russian Premier League: 9th
- Russian Cup: Regions path Quarter-finals Stage 2
- Top goalscorer: League: Artem Dzyuba (9); All: Artem Dzyuba (10)
- Highest home attendance: 8,728 vs Spartak Moscow (19 April 2025)
- Lowest home attendance: 2,644 vs Orenburg (30 November 2024)
- Average home league attendance: 4,655
Home colours	Away colours	Third colours
- All statistics correct as of 7 December 2024.

The 2024–25 season was the eighth season in the history of FC Akron Tolyatti, and the club's first season in the Russian top division. In addition to the domestic league, the team participated in the Russian Cup.

== Squad ==
As of 8 February 2025

Note: Flags indicate national team as defined under FIFA eligibility rules; some limited exceptions apply. Players may hold more than one non-FIFA nationality.

No.	Pos.	Nation	Player
1	GK	RUS	Sergey Volkov
4	DF	BRA	Paulo Vitor
5	MF	SRB	Aleksa Đurasović
6	MF	RUS	Maksim Kuzmin
7	FW	RUS	Kirill Danilin
11	FW	CPV	Benchimol
14	MF	RUS	Vladimir Khubulov (on loan from Krylia Sovetov Samara)
15	MF	MNE	Stefan Lončar
17	MF	RUS	Soltmurad Bakayev
19	DF	RUS	Marat Bokoyev
20	MF	RUS	Artur Galoyan
21	DF	BOL	Roberto Fernández (on loan from Bolívar)
22	DF	ROU	Ionuț Nedelcearu

No.	Pos.	Nation	Player
24	FW	RUS	Artem Dzyuba
25	MF	UZB	Sherzod Esanov
26	DF	POR	Rodrigo Escoval
35	MF	BIH	Ifet Đakovac
50	GK	RUS	Dmitry Nagayev
65	MF	RUS	Vladimir Moskvichyov (on loan from Torpedo Moscow)
69	FW	RUS	Arseni Dmitriyev
71	FW	RUS	Dmitri Pestryakov
77	MF	RUS	Konstantin Savichev
78	GK	RUS	Aleksandr Vasyutin
80	DF	RUS	Vyacheslav Bardybakhin
91	MF	RUS	Maksim Boldyrev
97	FW	RUS	Sergei Gribov

=== Reserve team ===
Note: Flags indicate national team as defined under FIFA eligibility rules; some limited exceptions apply. Players may hold more than one non-FIFA nationality.

No.	Pos.	Nation	Player
—	MF	RUS	Aleksey Gusev
17	DF	RUS	Nikita Krivoruchko
28	MF	RUS	Aksenty Chaligava
37	DF	RUS	Vladislav Konovalov
55	DF	RUS	Aleksandr Popov

No.	Pos.	Nation	Player
67	FW	RUS	Ali Kartoyev
75	MF	RUS	Vyacheslav Vinnikov
87	FW	RUS	Nikita Shershov

=== Out on loan ===
Note: Flags indicate national team as defined under FIFA eligibility rules; some limited exceptions apply. Players may hold more than one non-FIFA nationality.

No.	Pos.	Nation	Player
13	FW	CGO	Mavis Tchibota (on loan at Bnei Sakhnin)
22	DF	BLR	Nikita Baranok (on loan at Maxline Vitebsk)
23	DF	MKD	Bojan Dimoski (on loan at Partizan)

== Transfers ==
=== In ===
Date	Position	Nationality	Name	To	Fee	Ref.
17 June 2024	DF	(Brazil)	Paulo Vitor	Maguary	Undisclosed	
21 June 2024	GK	(Russia)	Aleksandr Vasyutin	Zenit St.Petersburg	Undisclosed	
24 June 2024	MF	(Montenegro)	Stefan Lončar	Debrecen	Undisclosed	
26 June 2024	DF	(Russia)	Vyacheslav Bardybakhin	Yenisey Krasnoyarsk	Undisclosed	
28 June 2024	MF	(Russia)	Maksim Kuzmin	Baltika Kaliningrad	Undisclosed	
29 June 2024	DF	(Portugal)	Rodrigo Escoval	Vizela	Undisclosed	
1 July 2024	MF	(Serbia)	Aleksa Đurasović	Spartak Subotica	Undisclosed	
2 July 2024	FW	(Russia)	Soltmurad Bakayev	Rubin Kazan	Undisclosed	
16 July 2024	DF	(Belarus)	Nikita Baranok	Shakhtyor Soligorsk	Undisclosed	
23 July 2024	MF	(Uzbekistan)	Sherzod Esanov	Andijon	Undisclosed	
23 July 2024	FW	(Cape Verde)	Benchimol	Estoril	Undisclosed	
12 September 2024	FW	(Russia)	Artem Dzyuba	Unattached	Free	
13 September 2024	FW	(Republic of the Congo)	Mavis Tchibota	Hapoel Tel Aviv	Undisclosed	
15 January 2025	MF	(Bosnia and Herzegovina)	Ifet Đakovac	TSC	Undisclosed	
7 February 2025	DF	(Romania)	Ionuț Nedelcearu	Palermo	Undisclosed	

=== Loans in ===
Date	Position	Nationality	Name	To	Date to	Ref.
9 July 2024	MF	(Russia)	Vladimir Moskvichyov	Torpedo Moscow	End of season	
17 July 2024	FW	(Russia)	Ivan Timoshenko	Rodina Moscow	9 January 2025	
6 August 2024	FW	(Russia)	Vladimir Khubulov	Krylia Sovetov Samara	End of season	
3 September 2024	DF	(Bolivia)	Roberto Fernández	Bolívar	End of season	

=== Out ===
Date	Position	Nationality	Name	To	Fee	Ref.
27 December 2024	DF	(Russia)	Aleksandr Alyokhin	Rodina Moscow	Undisclosed	
11 February 2025	GK	(Russia)	Ignat Terekhovsky	Krasnodar	Undisclosed	

=== Loans out ===
Date	Position	Nationality	Name	To	Date to	Ref.
26 January 2025	DF	(Belarus)	Nikita Baranok	Maxline Vitebsk	End of season	
27 January 2025	FW	(Republic of the Congo)	Mavis Tchibota	Bnei Sakhnin	End of season	
8 February 2025	DF	(North Macedonia)	Bojan Dimoski	Partizan	End of season	

=== Released ===
Date	Position	Nationality	Name	Joined	Date	Ref.
27 December 2024	MF	(Russia)	Maksim Paliyenko	Urartu	19 January 2025	

== Friendlies ==
27 June 2024 Friendly	Akron Tolyatti (Russia)	10–0	(Turkey) Isparta 32

8 July 2024 Friendly	Antalyaspor (Turkey)	0–4	(Russia) Akron Tolyatti	Burdur
11:15 UTC+3			Bardybakhin 8'; Gribov 34'; Bakaev 37'; Boldyrev 55'	Stadium: Makü İstiklal Stadı
Note: 2 x 35 minutes

8 July 2024 Friendly	FC Khan Tengri (Kazakhstan)	2–5	(Russia) Akron Tolyatti	Turkey
19:00 UTC+3	Boldyrev 12' (pen.); Nurdaulet Agzambaev 61', (penalty missed) 81'		Boldyrev 9'; Paliyenko 48'; Daniilin 49'; Gribov 73', 77'

14 July 2024 Friendly	Antalyaspor (Turkey)	2–3	(Russia) Akron Tolyatti	Burdur, Turkey
18:00 UTC+3	Van de Streek 59'; Sarı 85'		Eldarushev 2'; Paulo Vitor 11'; Đurasović 90+2'	Stadium: Makü İstiklal Stadı

23 January 2025	Akron Tolyatti	2–2	Rodina Moscow	Abu Dhabi, United Arab Emirates
17:00 SAMT (UTC+4)	Dzyuba 33'; Bakayev 79'	Report	Kontsevoy 21'; Markitesov 24'	Stadium: 321 Sport Complex

28 January 2025	Akron Tolyatti	1–3	Chengdu Rongcheng	Abu Dhabi, United Arab Emirates
11:00 SAMT (UTC+4)	Dmitriyev 69'	Report	Felipe 6'; Yan 61'; Li 70'	Stadium: 321 Sport Complex

29 January 2025	Akron Tolyatti	2–0	Urartu	Dubai, United Arab Emirates
18:00 SAMT (UTC+4)	Bakayev; Đurasović	Report		Stadium: Jabel Ali Stadium

5 February 2025	Akron Tolyatti	3–1	Chengdu Rongcheng	Dubai, United Arab Emirates
SAMT (UTC+4)	Dzyuba 15', 33'; Gribov 51'	Report	Rômulo 28'	Stadium: JA Sport Center; Attendance: 50

9 February 2025	Akron Tolyatti	1–0	Zhejiang Professional	Dubai, United Arab Emirates
18:00 SAMT (UTC+4)	Dzyuba 65'	Report

== Competitions ==
=== Overall record ===
Competition	First match	Last match	Starting round	Final position	Record							
Competition	First match	Last match	Starting round	Final position	Pld	W	D	L	GF	GA	GD	Win %
Premier League	20 July 2024	24 May 2025	Matchday 1	9th	30	10	5	15	39	55	−16	33.33
Russian Cup	30 July 2024	12 March 2025	Group Stage	Regions path Quarter-finals Stage 2	8	3	1	4	9	15	−6	37.50
Total					38	13	6	19	48	70	−22	34.21

Last updated: 24 May 2025
Source: Soccerway

=== Premier League ===
==== League table ====
Pos	Team	Pld	W	D	L	GF	GA	GD	Pts
7	Rubin Kazan	30	13	6	11	42	45	−3	45
8	Rostov	30	10	9	11	41	43	−2	39
9	Akron Tolyatti	30	10	5	15	39	55	−16	35
10	Krylia Sovetov Samara	30	8	7	15	36	51	−15	31
11	Dynamo Makhachkala	30	6	11	13	27	35	−8	29 (Note: Dynamo Makhachkala 4–1 Khimki, Khimki 1–1 Dynamo Makhachkala)

Source: Premier Liga
Rules for classification: 1) Points; 2) Head-to-head points; 3) Head-to-head matches won; 4) Head-to-head goal difference; 5) Head-to-head goals scored; 6) Matches won; 7) Goal difference; 8) Goals scored; 9) 2023–24 position (not applicable to final standings); 10) Play-off. Note: if teams tied on points did not play an equal number of head-to-head games, head-to-head results are not considered for the standings.

==== Results summary ====
Overall								Home						Away					
Pld	W	D	L	GF	GA	GD	Pts	W	D	L	GF	GA	GD	W	D	L	GF	GA	GD
30	10	5	15	39	55	−16	35	6	1	8	22	30	−8	4	4	7	17	25	−8

Last updated: 24 May 2025.

==== Results by round ====
Round	1	2	3	4	5	6	7	8	9	10	11	12	13	14	15	16	17	18	19	20	21	22	23	24	25	26	27	28	29	30
Ground	A	A	H	A	H	A	A	H	H	A	H	H	A	H	A	A	H	A	A	A	H	H	A	H	H	A	H	H	A	H
Result	L	W	L	D	L	L	D	W	L	W	D	L	D	W	L	L	W	W	L	W	L	L	L	W	L	D	W	W	L	L
Position	12	6	9	10	13	14	14	11	11	9	8	10	8	8	9	10	9	9	9	9	9	9	9	9	9	10	9	9	9	9

Updated to match(es) played on 24 May 2025. Source:
A = Away; H = Home; W = Win; D = Draw; L = Loss

==== Matches ====
The match schedule was released on 20 June 2024.

20 July 2024 1	Lokomotiv Moscow	3–2	Akron Tolyatti	Moscow
16:00 SAMT (UTC+4)	Pinyaev 28'; Batrakov 38', (yellow card) 86'; Barinov (yellow card) 45+2'; Vorobyev 79'	Report	Bakaev 36'; Eldarushev 40'; Danilin (yellow card) 45+2'; Palienko (yellow card) 55'; Dimoski (yellow card) 63'	Stadium: RZD Arena; Attendance: 7,520; Referee: Vladimir Moskalyov

27 July 2024 2	Fakel Voronezh	0–2	Akron Tolyatti	Voronezh
21:00 SAMT (UTC+4)	Bozhin (yellow card) 6'; Markov (red card) 45+'; Yakimov (yellow card) 56'; Mertens (yellow card) 79'	Report	Dimoski (yellow card) 22'; Gribov (yellow card) 48'; Timoshenko 65'; Bakayev 77'	Stadium: Central Stadium of Trade Unions; Attendance: 9,619; Referee: Vladislav Bezborodov

3 August 2024 3	Akron Tolyatti	0–2	Dynamo Moscow	Samara
16:00 SAMT (UTC+4)	Vitor (yellow card) 22'; Savichev (yellow card) 40'; Esanov (yellow card) 77'	Report	Tyukavin 9'; Gladyshev 57'	Stadium: Solidarnost Samara Arena; Attendance: 6,581; Referee: Pavel Shadykhanov

10 August 2024 4	Orenburg	2–2	Akron Tolyatti	Orenburg
18:30 SAMT (UTC+4)	Ghorbani (yellow card) 32' (goal) 61'; Bašić (yellow card) 45+'; Saharkhizan 48'; Pérez (yellow card) 78'	Report	Savichev (yellow card) 4' (goal) 45+' (pen.); Danilin 65'	Stadium: Gazovik Stadium; Attendance: 4,584; Referee: Sergey Tsyganok

19 August 2024 5	Akron Tolyatti	1–2	Rubin Kazan	Samara
18:30 SAMT (UTC+4)	Paliyenko 9'	Report	Savichev 55' (o.g.); Vujačić (yellow card) 67'; Daku 90' (yellow card) 90'	Stadium: Solidarnost Samara Arena; Attendance: 3,567; Referee: Egor Egorov

24 August 2024 6	CSKA Moscow	4–0	Akron Tolyatti	Moscow
16:00 SAMT (UTC+4)	Willyan (yellow card) 2'; Musayev 49'; Oblyakov 60', 87' (pen.); Moisés 82'	Report		Stadium: VEB Arena; Attendance: 8,054; Referee: Artem Chistyakov

31 August 2024 7	Akhmat Grozny	0–0	Akron Tolyatti	Grozny
21:00 SAMT (UTC+4)	Camilo (yellow card) 88'	Report	Bakayev (yellow card) 67'; Escoval (yellow card) 87'	Stadium: Akhmat-Arena; Attendance: 3,863; Referee: Roman Safyan

15 September 2024 8	Akron Tolyatti	3–0	Khimki	Samara
SAMT (UTC+4)	Bakayev 38'; Lončar 44'; Savichev (yellow card) 71'; Khubulov 90+'	Report	Fariña (yellow card) 90'	Stadium: Solidarnost Samara Arena; Attendance: 3,853; Referee: Sergey Tsyganok

21 September 2024 9	Akron Tolyatti	2–5	Krasnodar	Samara
15:00 SAMT (UTC+4)	Đurasović (yellow card) 22'; Kuzmin (yellow card) 37'; Lončar 54'; Khubulov 86'	Report	Córdoba 27', 76'; Spertsyan 29', 59'; Sá (yellow card) 42'; Krivtsov 88'	Stadium: Solidarnost Samara Arena; Attendance: 4,956; Referee: Vitali Meshkov

28 September 2024 10	Rostov	0–2	Akron Tolyatti	Rostov-on-Don
21:00 SAMT (UTC+4)	Mohebi (yellow card) 69'	Report	Benchimol 5'; Dzyuba 32'	Stadium: Rostov Arena; Attendance: 11,510; Referee: Ivan Abrosimov

5 October 2024 11	Akron Tolyatti	2–2	Pari NN	Samara
15:00 SAMT (UTC+4)	Benchimol 40'; Lončar 64'	Report	Glazer (yellow card) 17'; Karič 47'; Zé Turbo 90+'	Stadium: Solidarnost Samara Arena; Attendance: 3,023; Referee: Yuri Karpov

18 October 2024 12	Akron Tolyatti	0–5	Zenit St.Petersburg	Samara
19:00 SAMT (UTC+4)	Savichev (yellow card) 49' (yellow-red card) 75'	Report	Mostovoy 16', 39'; Cassierra 45'; Gondou 52'; Artur 85'	Stadium: Solidarnost Samara Arena; Attendance: 4,693; Referee: Evgeniy Bulanov

26 October 2024 13	Dynamo Makhachkala	1–1	Akron Tolyatti	Kaspiysk
15:00 SAMT (UTC+4)	Agalarov (yellow card) 40' (goal) 68'; Yusupov (yellow card) 90+1'; Kagermazov (yellow card) 90+4'	Report	Danilin (yellow card) 9'; Lončar (yellow card) 41'; Bakayev (yellow card) 90+2'; Khubulov 90+3'	Stadium: Anzhi Arena; Attendance: 4,554; Referee: Artem Chistyakov

3 November 2024 14	Akron Tolyatti	2–0	Krylia Sovetov	Samara
14:00 SAMT (UTC+4)	Escoval 20'; Lončar (yellow card) 59'; Kuzmin (yellow card) 64'; Dzyuba 72'	Report	Babkin (yellow card) 50'; Sergeyev (penalty missed) 90+'	Stadium: Solidarnost Samara Arena; Attendance: 8,438; Referee: Mikhail Cheremnykh

10 November 2024 15	Spartak Moscow	4–0	Akron Tolyatti	Moscow
16:15 SAMT (UTC+4)	Bongonda 28', 63'; Ugalde 58', 74'	Report	Bakayev (yellow card) 86' (yellow-red card) 86'	Stadium: Lukoil Arena; Attendance: 11,360; Referee: Sergey Ivanov

22 November 2024 16	Rubin Kazan	3–0	Akron Tolyatti	Kazan
19:00 SAMT (UTC+4)	Kabutov (yellow card) 5'; Daku 10', 20'; Bezrukov (yellow card) 63'; Fameyeh 88' (pen.)	Report		Stadium: Ak Bars Arena; Attendance: 6,496; Referee: Yan Bobrovsky

30 November 2024 17	Akron Tolyatti	1–0	Orenburg	Samara
15:00 SAMT (UTC+4)	Lončar (yellow card) 43' (goal) 60'; Savichev (yellow card) 50'; Pestryakov (yellow card) 74'	Report	Marín (yellow card) 45+'	Stadium: Solidarnost Samara Arena; Attendance: 2,644; Referee: Rafael Shafeev

7 December 2024 18	Zenit St.Petersburg	1–2	Akron Tolyatti	Saint Petersburg
17:30 SAMT (UTC+4)	Mostovoy 21'; Wendel (yellow card) 49'; Gondou (yellow card) 90+'	Report	Lončar 10' (yellow card) 45+'; Dzyuba 40'; Danilin (yellow card) 49' (yellow-red card) 55'; Bokoyev (yellow card) 63'; Bardybakhin (yellow card) 87'; Fernández (yellow card) 90+'	Stadium: Krestovsky Stadium; Attendance: 30,006; Referee: Vladimir Moskalyov

1 March 2025 19	Pari NN	2–1	Akron Tolyatti	Nizhny Novgorod
15:00 SAMT (UTC+4)	Grulyov 48'; Koksharov 50'	Report	Dzyuba 70'; Khubulov (yellow card) 77'; Savichev (yellow card) 90+'	Stadium: Nizhny Novgorod Stadium; Attendance: 6,399; Referee: Sergey Cheban

9 March 2025 20	Krylia Sovetov	0–2	Akron Tolyatti	Samara
17:30 SAMT (UTC+4)	Soldatenkov (yellow card) 36'	Report	Dzyuba 9'; Kuzmin (yellow card) 36'; Fernández (yellow card) 65'; Lončar 84'	Stadium: Solidarnost Samara Arena; Attendance: 13,391; Referee: Evgeniy Kukulyak

16 March 2025 21	Akron Tolyatti	1–2	CSKA Moscow	Samara
14:00 SAMT (UTC+4)	Khubulov 64'; Bokoyev (yellow card) 90'; Moskvichyov (yellow card) 90+'	Report	Glebov 36'; Guarirapa 59'; Kislyak (yellow card) 63'	Stadium: Solidarnost Samara Arena; Attendance: 3,896; Referee: Mikhail Cheremnykh

31 March 2025 22	Akron Tolyatti	2–3	Rostov	Samara
19:30 SAMT (UTC+4)	Bokoyev 32'; Đakovac 89'	Report	Osipenko (penalty missed) 41' 44'; Mohebi 62' (yellow card) 90+'; Sako 87'	Stadium: Solidarnost Samara Arena; Attendance: 2,785; Referee: Pavel Shadykhanov

5 April 2025 23	Krasnodar	1–0	Akron Tolyatti	Krasnodar
20:45 SAMT (UTC+4)	Kaio 50'; Chernikov (yellow card) 70'	Report	Escoval (yellow card) 5'; Bardybakhin (yellow card) 56'; Đurasović (yellow card) 64'	Stadium: Krasnodar Stadium; Attendance: 25,669; Referee: Vitali Meshkov

13 April 2025 24	Akron Tolyatti	1–0	Fakel Voronezh	Samara
15:30 SAMT (UTC+4)	Fernández (yellow card) 29'; Dzyuba 72' (pen.)	Report	Mertens (yellow card) 76'	Stadium: Solidarnost Samara Arena; Attendance: 2,948; Referee: Vasily Kazartsev

19 April 2025 25	Akron Tolyatti	2–3	Spartak Moscow	Samara
15:30 SAMT (UTC+4)	Dzyuba 23' (pen.) (yellow card) 79'; Pestryakov 29' (yellow card) 71'; Savichev (yellow card) 34'; Kuzmin (yellow card) 45+'; Đakovac (yellow card) 90+'	Report	Bongonda 39'; Barco (penalty missed) 45+' 90+' (pen.) (yellow card) 90+'; Đurasović 61' (o.g.); Solari (yellow card) 71'	Stadium: Solidarnost Samara Arena; Attendance: 8,728; Referee: Aleksey Sukhoi

27 April 2025 26	Khimki	2–2	Akron Tolyatti	Khimki
17:30 SAMT (UTC+4)	Savichev 25' (o.g.); Vera 29' (pen.); Zabolotny (yellow card) 65'; D.Fernández (yellow card) 85'	Report	Dzyuba 12'; Escoval (yellow card) 27' (goal) 67'; R.Fernández (yellow card) 37'; Bokoyev (yellow card) 42'; Nedelcearu (yellow card) 90+'	Stadium: Khimki Arena; Attendance: 1,542; Referee: Egor Egorov

2 May 2025 27	Akron Tolyatti	1–0	Dynamo Makhachkala	Samara
19:00 SAMT (UTC+4)	Dzyuba 74'; Savichev (yellow card) 79'; Benchimol (yellow card) 85'	Report	Sundukov (yellow card) 72'; Alibekov (yellow card) 84'	Stadium: Solidarnost Samara Arena; Attendance: 2,942; Referee: Vitali Meshkov

11 May 2025 28	Akron Tolyatti	3–2	Akhmat Grozny	Samara
15:00 SAMT (UTC+4)	Pestryakov 17'; Bakayev (yellow card) 21'; Đakovac 45+'; Benchimol (yellow card) 61' (yellow-red card) 90+'; Savichev (yellow card) 79'; Khubulov 85'		Talal 8'; Melkadze 72'; Ismael (yellow card) 75'; Kharin (yellow card) 84'	Stadium: Solidarnost Samara Arena; Attendance: 2,967; Referee: Ivan Abrosimov

18 May 2025 29	Dynamo Moscow	2–1	Akron Tolyatti	Moscow
17:30 SAMT (UTC+4)	Fomin 16' (yellow card) 79'; Fernández (yellow card) 85'; Maouhoub 90+' (yellow card) 90+'	Report	Esanov (yellow card) 32'; Nedelcearu (yellow card) 33'; Khubulov (yellow card) 46'; Galoyan (yellow card) 75' (goal) 80'	Stadium: VTB Arena; Attendance: 15,041; Referee: Egor Egorov

24 May 2025 30	Akron Tolyatti	1–4	Lokomotiv Moscow	Samara
17:30 SAMT (UTC+4)	Bokoyev (yellow card) 71'; Morozov 85' (o.g.)	Report	Batrakov 24' (pen.); Vorobyov 48'; Saltykov (yellow card) 50'; Pinyayev 62'; Morozov (yellow card) 83'; Dmitriyev 90+' (o.g.)	Stadium: Solidarnost Samara Arena; Attendance: 7,800; Referee: Alexander Mashlyakevich

=== Russian Cup ===
==== Group stage ====
Pos	Team	Pld	W	PW	PL	L	GF	GA	GD	Pts	Qualification
1	Zenit Saint Petersburg	6	5	0	1	0	13	2	+11	16	Qualification to the Knockout phase (RPL path)
2	Rubin Kazan	6	3	0	0	3	7	4	+3	9	Qualification to the Knockout phase (RPL path)
3	Akron Tolyatti	6	2	1	0	3	6	12	−6	8	Qualification to the Knockout phase (regions path)
4	Fakel Voronezh	6	1	0	0	5	2	10	−8	3	

Source: Russian Football Union (in Russian), Soccerway
Rules for classification: 1) Points; 2) Head-to-head points; 3) Head-to-head matches won; 4) Head-to-head goal difference; 5) Head-to-head goals scored; 6) Matches won; 7) Goal difference; 8) Goals scored; 9) Penalty shoot-out goal difference; 10) Draw.

30 July 2024 1	Rubin Kazan	4–0	Akron Tolyatti	Kazan
19:30 SAMT (U8TC+4)	Kuznetsov 8'; Ivanov (yellow card) 10'; Rozhkov 48'; Jukić 74'; Iwu 81'	Report	Baranok (yellow card) 26'; Moskvichyov (yellow card) 47'	Stadium: Ak Bars Arena; Attendance: 7,140; Referee: Roman Safyan

15 August 2024 2	Fakel Voronezh	1–2	Akron Tolyatti	Voronezh
19:00 SAMT (UTC+4)	Markov 5'	Report	Dmitriyev 10'; Paliyenko 70' (pen.)	Stadium: Fakel Stadium; Attendance: 10,052; Referee: Ranel Ziyakov

27 August 2024 3	Akron Tolyatti	1–1 (5–4 p)	Zenit St.Petersburg	Samara
19:15 SAMT (UTC+4)	Esanov (yellow card) 48'; Timoshenko 54' (pen.); Khubulov (yellow card) 65'; Bakaev (yellow card) 73'	Report	Alip (yellow card) 37'; Vasiljev 45+2', (yellow card) 84'	Stadium: Solidarnost Samara Arena; Attendance: 4,834; Referee: Sergey Tsyganok
	Penalties
	Kuzmin (penalty scored); Bakaev (penalty scored); Timoshenko (penalty scored); Júnior (penalty scored); Khubulov (penalty scored)		Mantuan (penalty scored); Pedro (penalty scored); Akhmetov (penalty scored); Artur (penalty missed); Claudinho (penalty scored)

17 September 2024 4	Akron Tolyatti	2–0	Fakel Voronezh	Samara
17:15 SAMT (UTC+4)	Khubulov 50' (yellow card) 55'; Gribov 63'	Report	Ivlev (yellow card) 22'; Mertens (yellow card) 90'	Stadium: Solidarnost Samara Arena; Attendance: 1,338; Referee: Vera Opeykina

2 October 2024 5	Zenit St.Petersburg	5–1	Akron Tolyatti	Saint Petersburg
22:15 SAMT (UTC+4)	Yerokhin (yellow card) 2' (goal) 6'; Artur 13', 43'; Pedro (yellow card) 39'; Sobolev 61'; Mostovoy 87' (pen.)	Report	Bardybakhin (yellow card) 46' (red card) 80'; Esanov (yellow card) 79'; Moskvichyov 90+2'	Stadium: Krestovsky Stadium; Attendance: 21,777; Referee: Egor Egorov

23 October 2024 6	Akron Tolyatti	0–1	Rubin Kazan	Samara
20:00 SAMT (UTC+4)	Pestryakov (yellow card) 27'; Khubulov (yellow card) 39'; Savichev (yellow card) 89'	Report	Shabanhaxhaj 8'; Rakhmonaliev (yellow card) 39'	Stadium: Solidarnost Samara Arena; Attendance: 1,050; Referee: Artem Lyubimov

==== Knockout phase ====
26 November 2024 Regions path Quarter-finals Stage 1	Shinnik Yaroslavl	0–1	Akron Tolyatti	Yaroslavl
19:15 SAMT (UTC+4)	Yakushevich (yellow card) 57'; Kul (yellow card) 64'; Samoylov (red card) 89'	Report	Malakhov 1' (o.g.); Gribov (yellow card) 45'; Kuzmin (yellow card) 85'; Baranok (yellow card) 89'	Stadium: Shinnik Stadium; Attendance: 3,658; Referee: Artem Lyubimov

12 March 2025 Regions path Quarter-finals Stage 2	Akron Tolyatti	2–3	Spartak Moscow	Samara
17:00 SAMT (UTC+4)	Esanov 58' (pen.); Dzyuba 70'	Report	Martins 17', 59'; Bongonda 59'	Stadium: Solidarnost Samara Arena; Attendance: 2,960; Referee: Artyom Chistyakov

== Squad statistics ==
As of match played 24 May 2025

=== Appearances and goals ===
No.	Pos	Nat	Player	Total		Premier League		Russian Cup	
No.	Pos	Nat	Player	Apps	Goals	Apps	Goals	Apps	Goals
1	GK	(Russia) RUS	Sergey Volkov	23	0	16+3	0	4	0
4	DF	(Brazil) BRA	Paulo Vitor	19	0	15+1	0	3	0
5	MF	(Serbia) SRB	Aleksa Đurasović	33	0	29+1	0	1+2	0
6	MF	(Russia) RUS	Maksim Kuzmin	29	0	20+5	0	2+2	0
7	FW	(Russia) RUS	Kirill Danilin	29	1	18+7	1	1+3	0
11	FW	(Cape Verde) CPV	Benchimol	25	2	11+8	2	3+3	0
14	MF	(Russia) RUS	Vladimir Khubulov	29	6	8+16	5	5	1
15	MF	(Montenegro) MNE	Stefan Lončar	31	6	26+3	6	0+2	0
17	MF	(Russia) RUS	Soltmurad Bakayev	30	3	18+7	3	2+3	0
19	DF	(Russia) RUS	Marat Bokoyev	25	1	10+7	1	6+2	0
20	MF	(Armenia) ARM	Artur Galoyan	11	1	0+7	1	2+2	0
21	DF	(Bolivia) BOL	Roberto Fernández	22	0	18+1	0	1+2	0
22	DF	(Romania) ROU	Ionuț Nedelcearu	13	0	11+1	0	0+1	0
24	FW	(Russia) RUS	Artem Dzyuba	24	10	20+2	9	1+1	1
25	MF	(Uzbekistan) UZB	Sherzod Esanov	16	1	1+8	0	7	1
26	DF	(Portugal) POR	Rodrigo Escoval	30	2	26+2	2	1+1	0
35	MF	(Bosnia and Herzegovina) BIH	Ifet Đakovac	8	2	6+2	2	0	0
50	GK	(Russia) RUS	Dmitry Nagayev	1	0	0	0	1	0
65	MF	(Russia) RUS	Vladimir Moskvichyov	18	1	1+9	0	7+1	1
69	FW	(Russia) RUS	Arseni Dmitriyev	9	1	0+5	0	3+1	1
71	FW	(Russia) RUS	Dmitri Pestryakov	23	2	12+5	2	5+1	0
77	DF	(Russia) RUS	Konstantin Savichev	27	1	26	1	0+1	0
78	GK	(Russia) RUS	Aleksandr Vasyutin	17	0	14	0	3	0
80	DF	(Russia) RUS	Vyacheslav Bardybakhin	15	0	2+6	0	6+1	0
91	MF	(Russia) RUS	Maksim Boldyrev	4	0	0+1	0	1+2	0
97	FW	(Russia) RUS	Sergei Gribov	14	1	2+7	0	2+3	1
Players away from the club on loan:
13	FW	(Republic of the Congo) CGO	Mavis Tchibota	5	0	0+2	0	3	0
22	DF	(Belarus) BLR	Nikita Baranok	7	0	0	0	7	0
23	DF	(North Macedonia) MKD	Bojan Dimoski	14	0	9	0	3+2	0
Players who appeared for Akron Tolyatti but left during the season:
10	MF	(Russia) RUS	Maksim Paliyenko	14	2	6+2	1	5+1	1
70	FW	(Russia) RUS	Abu-Said Eldarushev	1	1	1	1	0	0
99	FW	(Russia) RUS	Ivan Timoshenko	16	2	4+7	1	3+2	1

=== Goal scorers ===
Place	Position	Nation	Number	Name	Premier League	Russian Cup	Total
1	FW	(Russia)	24	Artem Dzyuba	9	1	10
2	MF	(Montenegro)	15	Stefan Lončar	6	0	6
2	MF	(Russia)	14	Vladimir Khubulov	5	1	6
4	MF	(Russia)	17	Soltmurad Bakayev	3	0	3
5	FW	(Cape Verde)	11	Benchimol	2	0	2
5	DF	(Portugal)	26	Rodrigo Escoval	2	0	2
5	FW	(Russia)	71	Dmitri Pestryakov	2	0	2
5	MF	(Bosnia and Herzegovina)	35	Ifet Đakovac	2	0	2
5	MF	(Russia)	10	Maksim Paliyenko	1	1	2
5	FW	(Russia)	99	Ivan Timoshenko	1	1	2
5				Own goal	1	1	2
12	MF	(Russia)	77	Konstantin Savichev	1	0	1
12	FW	(Russia)	70	Abu-Said Eldarushev	1	0	1
12	FW	(Russia)	7	Kirill Danilin	1	0	1
12	DF	(Russia)	19	Marat Bokoyev	1	0	1
12	MF	(Armenia)	20	Artur Galoyan	1	0	1
12	FW	(Russia)	69	Arseni Dmitriyev	0	1	1
12	FW	(Russia)	97	Sergei Gribov	0	1	1
12	MF	(Russia)	65	Vladimir Moskvichyov	0	1	1
12	MF	(Uzbekistan)	25	Sherzod Esanov	0	1	1
Total					38	9	47

=== Clean sheets ===
Place	Position	Nation	Number	Name	Premier League	Russian Cup	Total
1	GK	(Russia)	78	Aleksandr Vasyutin	6	1	7
2	GK	(Russia)	1	Sergey Volkov	4	1	5
Total					8	2	10

Aleksandr Vasyutin & Sergey Volkov both played in Akron's 2-0 victory over Rostov on 28 September 2024 and in Akron's 2-0 victory over Krylia Sovetov on 9 March 2025

=== Disciplinary record ===
Number	Nation	Position	Name	Premier League		Russian Cup		Total	
Number	Nation	Position	Name	Yellow card	Red card	Yellow card	Red card	Yellow card	Red card
4	(Brazil)	DF	Paulo Vitor	1	0	0	0	1	0
5	(Serbia)	MF	Aleksa Đurasović	2	0	0	0	2	0
6	(Russia)	MF	Maksim Kuzmin	4	0	1	0	5	0
7	(Russia)	MF	Kirill Danilin	4	1	0	0	4	1
11	(Cape Verde)	FW	Benchimol	3	1	0	0	3	1
14	(Russia)	MF	Vladimir Khubulov	2	0	3	0	5	0
15	(Montenegro)	MF	Stefan Lončar	4	0	0	0	4	0
17	(Russia)	MF	Soltmurad Bakayev	5	1	1	0	6	1
19	(Russia)	DF	Marat Bokoyev	4	0	0	0	4	0
20	(Armenia)	MF	Artur Galoyan	1	0	0	0	1	0
21	(Bolivia)	DF	Roberto Fernández	4	0	0	0	4	0
22	(Romania)	DF	Ionuț Nedelcearu	2	0	0	0	2	0
24	(Russia)	FW	Artem Dzyuba	1	0	0	0	1	0
25	(Uzbekistan)	MF	Sherzod Esanov	2	0	2	0	4	0
26	(Portugal)	DF	Rodrigo Escoval	3	0	0	0	3	0
35	(Bosnia and Herzegovina)	MF	Ifet Đakovac	1	0	0	0	1	0
65	(Russia)	MF	Vladimir Moskvichyov	1	0	1	0	2	0
71	(Russia)	FW	Dmitri Pestryakov	2	0	1	0	3	0
77	(Russia)	DF	Konstantin Savichev	10	1	1	0	11	1
80	(Russia)	DF	Vyacheslav Bardybakhin	2	0	1	1	3	1
97	(Russia)	FW	Sergei Gribov	1	0	1	0	2	0
Players away on loan:
22	(Belarus)	DF	Nikita Baranok	0	0	2	0	2	0
23	(North Macedonia)	DF	Bojan Dimoski	2	0	0	0	2	0
Players who left Akron Tolyatti during the season:
10	(Russia)	MF	Maksim Paliyenko	1	0	0	0	1	0
Total				62	4	14	1	76	5
