= Nikita Shershov =

Russian footballer (born 2004)

Personal information
- Full name: Nikita Anatolyevich Shershov
- Date of birth: 26 June 2004 (age 22)
- Place of birth: Saint Petersburg, Russia
- Height: 1.76 m (5 ft 9 in)
- Positions: Left winger; left midfielder

Team information
- Current team: Yenisey Krasnoyarsk
- Number: 25

Youth career
- –2022: Zenit St. Petersburg

Senior career*
Years	Team	Apps	(Gls)
2022–2023	Orenburg	0	(0)
2022–2023	→ Orenburg-2	38	(5)
2024–2026	Akron Tolyatti	1	(0)
2024–2026	→ Akron-2 Tolyatti	32	(5)
2026–	Yenisey Krasnoyarsk	10	(0)
- * Club domestic league appearances and goals as of 16 May 2026

Nikita Anatolyevich Shershov (Russian: Никита Анатольевич Шершов; born 26 June 2004) is a Russian footballer who plays as a left winger or left midfielder for Yenisey Krasnoyarsk.

== Career ==
Shershov made his debut for Orenburg on 31 August 2022 in a Russian Cup game against Akhmat Grozny.

He made his Russian Premier League debut for Akron Tolyatti on 31 August 2025 against Baltika Kaliningrad.

On 18 February 2026, Shershov signed one-and-a-half-season contract with Yenisey Krasnoyarsk.

== Career statistics ==
As of 16 May 2026

Club	Season	League			Cup		Continental		Total	
Club	Season	Division	Apps	Goals	Apps	Goals	Apps	Goals	Apps	Goals
Orenburg-2	2022–23	Russian Second League	27	5	–		–		27	5
Orenburg-2	2023	Russian Second League B	11	0	–		–		11	0
Orenburg-2	Total		38	5	0	0	0	0	38	5
Orenburg	2022–23	Russian Premier League	0	0	3	0	–		3	0
Akron-2 Tolyatti	2024	Russian Second League B	18	3	–		–		18	3
Akron-2 Tolyatti	2025	Russian Second League B	14	2	–		–		14	2
Akron-2 Tolyatti	Total		32	5	0	0	0	0	32	5
Akron Tolyatti	2024–25	Russian Premier League	0	0	0	0	–		0	0
Akron Tolyatti	2025–26	Russian Premier League	1	0	3	0	–		4	0
Akron Tolyatti	Total		1	0	3	0	0	0	4	0
Yenisey Krasnoyarsk	2025–26	Russian First League	10	0	–		–		10	0
Career total			81	10	6	0	0	0	87	10
