= Ifet Đakovac =

Bosnian footballer

Personal information
- Date of birth: 5 December 1997 (age 28)
- Place of birth: Sjenica, Serbia, FR Yugoslavia
- Height: 1.80 m (5 ft 11 in)
- Position: Midfielder

Team information
- Current team: Vojvodina
- Number: 35

Youth career
- Sloboda Užice
- Novi Pazar
- Partizan

Senior career*
Years	Team	Apps	(Gls)
2016–2017	Zlatibor Čajetina	34	(5)
2017–2019	Tutin	70	(16)
2020	Zlatibor Čajetina	26	(5)
2021–2025	TSC	126	(29)
2025–2026	Akron Tolyatti	34	(2)
2026–	Vojvodina	15	(2)

International career^{‡}
2024–	Bosnia and Herzegovina	1	(0)
- * Club domestic league appearances and goals as of 22 November 2026 ‡ National team caps and goals as of 20 December 2024

Ifet Đakovac (Serbian Cyrillic: Ифет Ђаковац; born 5 December 1997) is a professional footballer who plays as a midfielder for Serbian club Vojvodina and the Bosnia and Herzegovina national team.

== Club career ==
In early 2016, Đakovac joined Drina Zone League club Zlatibor Čajetina, helping them win promotion to the Serbian League West. He later switched to Tutin in the summer of 2017. In early 2020, Đakovac returned to Zlatibor Čajetina, helping the club win the Serbian First League.

In January 2021, Đakovac was transferred to TSC. He scored 10 goals during the 2022–23 Serbian SuperLiga, helping the club to a runners-up finish. Subsequently, Đakovac scored a new career-high 11 league goals in the 2023–24 season.

On 15 January 2025, Đakovac signed a long-term contract with Russian Premier League club Akron Tolyatti.

On 12 June 2026, Đakovac moved to Vojvodina in Serbia.

== International career ==
In July 2024, it was reported that Đakovac was in the process of obtaining Bosnian citizenship in order to represent the Bosnia and Herzegovina national team. He received his first call-up to the Bosnia and Herzegovina squad under manager Sergej Barbarez in August 2024 ahead of UEFA Nations League fixtures the following month against the Netherlands and Hungary, remaining an unused substitute. On 19 November 2024, Đakovac made his international debut for Bosnia and Herzegovina after coming on as an injury-time substitute for Edin Džeko in a 1–1 home draw with the Netherlands.

== Career statistics ==
=== Club ===
As of 22 November 2026

Appearances and goals by club, season and competition
Club	Season	League			Cup		Continental		Other		Total	
Club	Season	Division	Apps	Goals	Apps	Goals	Apps	Goals	Apps	Goals	Apps	Goals
Zlatibor Čajetina	2015–16	Drina Zone League	10	3	—		—		—		10	3
Zlatibor Čajetina	2016–17	Serbian League West	24	2	—		—		—		24	2
Zlatibor Čajetina	Total		34	5	0	0	0	0	0	0	34	5
Tutin	2017–18	Serbian League West	27	2	—		—		—		27	2
Tutin	2018–19	Serbian League West	26	6	—		—		—		26	6
Tutin	2019–20	Serbian League West	17	8	—		—		—		17	8
Tutin	Total		70	16	0	0	0	0	0	0	70	16
Zlatibor Čajetina	2019–20	Serbian First League	7	2	0	0	—		—		7	2
Zlatibor Čajetina	2020–21	Serbian SuperLiga	19	3	1	0	—		—		20	3
Zlatibor Čajetina	Total		26	5	1	0	0	0	0	0	27	5
TSC	2020–21	Serbian SuperLiga	17	0	1	0	0	0	—		18	0
TSC	2021–22	Serbian SuperLiga	31	2	3	0	—		—		34	2
TSC	2022–23	Serbian SuperLiga	34	10	3	0	—		—		37	10
TSC	2023–24	Serbian SuperLiga	29	11	0	0	7 (Note: One appearance in UEFA Champions League, six appearances and two goals in UEFA Europa League)	2	—		36	13
TSC	2024–25	Serbian SuperLiga	15	6	0	0	8 (Note: Two appearances in UEFA Europa League, six appearances and two goals in UEFA Conference League)	2	—		23	8
TSC	Total		126	29	7	0	15	4	0	0	148	33
Akron Tolyatti	2024–25	Russian Premier League	8	2	—		—		—		8	2
Akron Tolyatti	2025–26	Russian Premier League	26	0	4	0	—		2 (Note: Appearance in relegation play-offs)	0	32	0
Akron Tolyatti	Total		34	2	4	0	0	0	2	0	40	2
Vojvodina	2026–27	Serbian SuperLiga	15	2	1	0	4	0	—		20	2
Career total			305	59	13	0	19	4	2	0	339	63

=== International ===
As of 20 December 2024

Appearances and goals by national team and year
National team	Year	Apps	Goals
Bosnia and Herzegovina	2024	1	0
Total		1	0

== Honours ==
Zlatibor Čajetina

- Serbian First League: 2019–20
- Drina Zone League: 2015–16

Individual

- Serbian SuperLiga Team of the Season: 2023–24
