= Sherzod Esanov =

Uzbekistani footballer

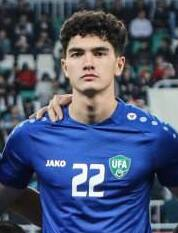
- Esanov in 2023

Personal information
- Full name: Sherzod Dilshodovich Esanov
- Date of birth: 1 February 2003 (age 23)
- Place of birth: Navoiy, Uzbekistan
- Height: 1.90 m (6 ft 3 in)
- Position: Central midfielder

Team information
- Current team: Bukhara
- Number: 25

Youth career
- –2020: Qizilqum Zarafshon

Senior career*
Years	Team	Apps	(Gls)
2021	Chigatoy		
2022–2024	Andijon	32	(3)
2023	→ Olympic Tashkent (loan)	11	(1)
2024–2025	Akron Tolyatti	9	(0)
2025	Dynamo Brest	9	(0)
2026–	Bukhara	13	(5)

International career^{‡}
2022	Uzbekistan U-19	6	(3)
2022–2023	Uzbekistan U-20	15	(2)
2023–2025	Uzbekistan U-23	9	(2)
2026–	Uzbekistan	7	(3)
- * Club domestic league appearances and goals as of 28 July 2026 ‡ National team caps and goals as of 17 November 2026 (UTC)

Sherzod Dilshodovich Esanov (born 1 February 2003) is an Uzbekistani football player who plays as a central midfielder for Bukhara and the Uzbekistan national team.

== Club career ==
On 23 July 2024, Esanov signed with the Russian Premier League newcomers Akron Tolyatti.

He made his debut for Akron on 30 July 2024 in a Russian Cup game against Rubin Kazan. He made his Russian Premier League debut for Akron on 3 August 2024 against Dynamo Moscow. Esanov left Akron by mutual consent on 24 July 2025.

== Career statistics ==
=== Club ===
As of match played 18 May 2025

Appearances and goals by club, season and competition
Club	Season	League			National cup		Continental		Other		Total	
Club	Season	Division	Apps	Goals	Apps	Goals	Apps	Goals	Apps	Goals	Apps	Goals
Andijon	2022	Uzbekistan Pro League	16	2	1	0	—		—		17	2
Andijon	2023	Uzbekistan Super League	5	0	0	0	—		—		5	0
Andijon	2024	Uzbekistan Super League	11	1	4	1	—		—		15	2
Andijon	Total		32	3	5	1	—		—		37	4
Olympic Tashkent (loan)	2023	Uzbekistan Super League	11	1	2	0	0	0	0	0	13	1
Akron Tolyatti	2024–25	Russian Premier League	9	0	7	1	—		—		16	1
Career total			52	4	14	2	0	0	0	0	66	6

=== International ===
Statistics accurate as of match played 17 November 2026.

No.	Date	Venue	Opponent	Score	Result	Competition
1	1 October 2026	Pakhtakor Central Stadium, Tashkent, Uzbekistan	Syria	1–0	4–1	Friendly
2	17 November 2026	Jassim bin Hamad Stadium, Doha, Qatar	Saudi Arabia	1–0	2–1	Friendly
3	17 November 2026	Jassim bin Hamad Stadium, Doha, Qatar	Saudi Arabia	2–1	2–1	Friendly

== Honours ==
Andijon

- Uzbekistan Pro League: 2022

Uzbekistan U20

- AFC U-20 Asian Cup: 2023
