= Vladimir Moskvichyov =

Russian footballer (born 2000)

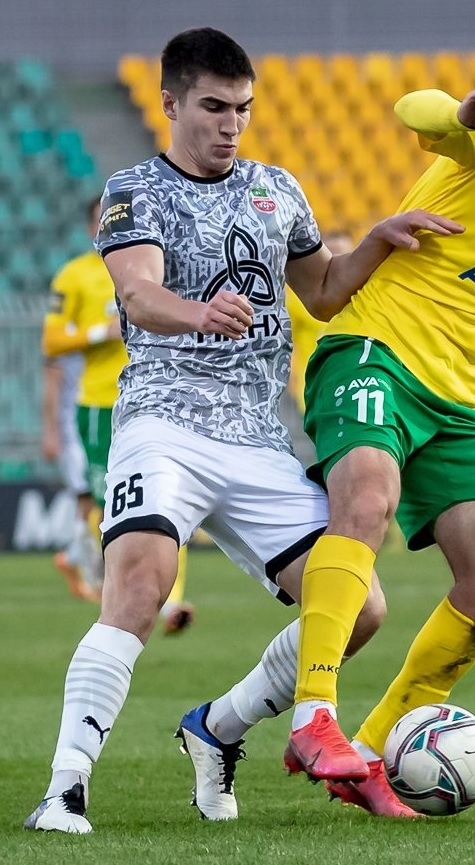
- Moskvichyov with Neftekhimik Nizhnekamsk in 2022

Personal information
- Full name: Vladimir Andreyevich Moskvichyov
- Date of birth: 2 March 2000 (age 26)
- Place of birth: Moscow, Russia
- Height: 1.77 m (5 ft 10 in)
- Position: Midfielder

Team information
- Current team: FC Torpedo Moscow
- Number: 5

Youth career
- –2011: SShOR №27 Sokol Moscow
- 2011–2017: FC Dynamo Moscow

Senior career*
Years	Team	Apps	(Gls)
2018–2023	FC Dynamo Moscow	7	(0)
2019	→ FC Orenburg (loan)	0	(0)
2020–2021	→ FC Dynamo-2 Moscow	16	(1)
2021–2023	→ FC Neftekhimik Nizhnekamsk (loan)	66	(2)
2023–	FC Torpedo Moscow	43	(2)
2024–2025	→ FC Akron Tolyatti (loan)	10	(0)

International career
2015–2016	Russia U-16	11	(0)
2016–2017	Russia U-17	21	(0)
2017–2018	Russia U-18	4	(0)
2018–2019	Russia U-19	12	(1)
2019	Russia U-20	1	(0)
- * Club domestic league appearances and goals as of 16 May 2026

Vladimir Andreyevich Moskvichyov (Russian: Владимир Андреевич Москвичёв; born 2 March 2000) is a Russian professional footballer who plays as a defensive midfielder for FC Torpedo Moscow.

== Club career ==
He made his debut for the first team of Dynamo Moscow on 26 September 2018 in a Russian Cup game against Torpedo Moscow.

He made his Russian Premier League debut for Dynamo on 21 October 2018 in a game against Zenit Saint Petersburg.

On 21 August 2019, he joined FC Orenburg on loan. The loan was terminated in January 2020.

On 9 July 2024, Moskvichyov joined FC Akron Tolyatti on loan.

== Career statistics ==
As of match played 18 May 2025

Appearances and goals by club, season and competition
Club	Season	League			Cup		Continental		Total	
Club	Season	Division	Apps	Goals	Apps	Goals	Apps	Goals	Apps	Goals
Dynamo Moscow	2017–18	Russian Premier League	0	0	0	0	—		0	0
Dynamo Moscow	2018–19	Russian Premier League	5	0	2	0	—		7	0
Dynamo Moscow	2019–20	Russian Premier League	0	0	—		—		0	0
Orenburg	2019–20	Russian Premier League	0	0	0	0	—		0	0
Dynamo Moscow	2020–21	Russian Premier League	2	0	0	0	0	0	2	0
Dynamo Moscow	Total		7	0	2	0	0	0	9	0
Dynamo-2 Moscow	2020–21	Russian Second League	16	1	—		—		16	1
Neftekhimik Nizhnekamsk	2021–22	Russian First League	35	2	0	0	—		35	2
Neftekhimik Nizhnekamsk	2022–23	Russian First League	31	0	1	0	—		32	0
Neftekhimik Nizhnekamsk	Total		66	2	1	0	—		67	2
Torpedo Moscow	2023–24	Russian First League	23	2	0	0	—		23	2
Akron Tolyatti	2024–25	Russian Premier League	10	0	7	1	—		17	1
Career total			122	5	10	1	0	0	132	6
