= Maksim Kuzmin =

Russian footballer

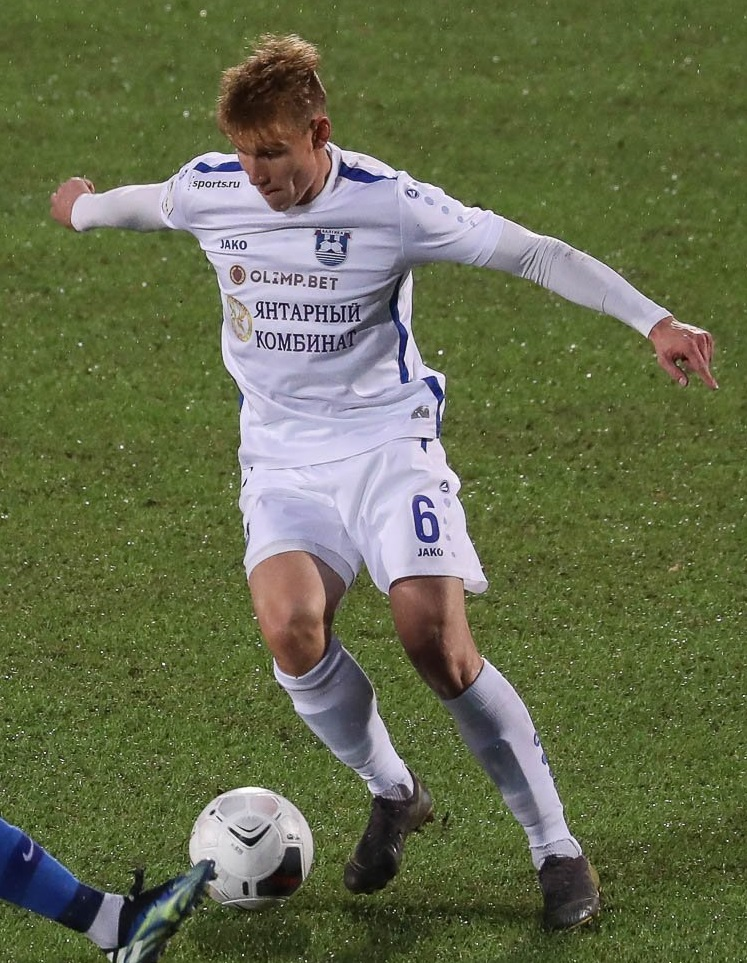
- Kuzmin with Baltika Kaliningrad in 2021

Personal information
- Full name: Maksim Aleksandrovich Kuzmin
- Date of birth: 1 June 1996 (age 30)
- Place of birth: Samara, Russia
- Height: 1.78 m (5 ft 10 in)
- Position: Attacking midfielder

Team information
- Current team: Sochi
- Number: 6

Youth career
- Akademiya Tolyatti

Senior career*
Years	Team	Apps	(Gls)
2013–2019	Dynamo Moscow	31	(1)
2018–2019	→ Fakel Voronezh (loan)	42	(2)
2019–2024	Baltika Kaliningrad	144	(7)
2024–2026	Akron Tolyatti	48	(0)
2026–	Sochi	0	(0)

International career
2011–2012	Russia U16	8	(1)
2012	Russia U17	1	(0)
- * Club domestic league appearances and goals as of 3 May 2026

Maksim Aleksandrovich Kuzmin (Russian: Максим Александрович Кузьмин; born 1 June 1996) is a Russian professional football player who plays as an attacking midfielder for Sochi.

== Club career ==
Kuzmin made his professional debut on 30 May 2015 for Dynamo Moscow in a Russian Premier League game against Krasnodar.

On 2 July 2019, he signed a two-year contract with Baltika Kaliningrad.

On 28 June 2024, Kuzmin signed with Akron Tolyatti. He left Akron as his contract expired on 9 June 2026.

On 18 June 2026, Kuzmin joined Sochi on a two-year contract.

== Career statistics ==
As of match played 3 May 2026

Appearances and goals by club, season and competition
Club	Season	League			Cup		Europe		Other		Total	
Club	Season	Division	Apps	Goals	Apps	Goals	Apps	Goals	Apps	Goals	Apps	Goals
Dynamo Moscow	2013–14	Russian Premier League	0	0	0	0	—		—		0	0
Dynamo Moscow	2014–15	Russian Premier League	1	0	0	0	0	0	—		1	0
Dynamo Moscow	2015–16	Russian Premier League	6	0	1	0	—		—		7	0
Dynamo Moscow	2016–17	Russian First League	24	1	2	1	—		—		26	2
Dynamo Moscow	2017–18	Russian Premier League	0	0	0	0	—		—		0	0
Dynamo Moscow	Total		31	1	3	0	—		—		34	1
Fakel Voronezh (loan)	2017–18	Russian First League	10	1	0	0	—		—		10	1
Fakel Voronezh (loan)	2018–19	Russian First League	32	1	1	0	—		5 (Note: Appearances in the FNL Cup)	0	38	1
Fakel Voronezh (loan)	Total		42	2	1	0	—		5	0	43	2
Baltika Kaliningrad	2019–20	Russian First League	26	2	—		—		—		26	2
Baltika Kaliningrad	2020–21	Russian First League	37	1	—		—		—		37	1
Baltika Kaliningrad	2021–22	Russian First League	29	0	1	0	—		—		30	0
Baltika Kaliningrad	2022–23	Russian First League	25	2	1	0	—		—		26	2
Baltika Kaliningrad	2023–24	Russian Premier League	26	2	10	1	—		—		36	3
Baltika Kaliningrad	Total		144	7	12	1	—		—		156	8
Akron Tolyatti	2024–25	Russian Premier League	25	0	4	0	—		—		29	0
Akron Tolyatti	2025–26	Russian Premier League	23	0	5	0	—		—		28	0
Akron Tolyatti	Total		48	0	9	0	—		—		57	0
Career total			264	10	25	2	0	0	5	0	294	12
