= Ivan Timoshenko =

Russian footballer

Personal information
- Full name: Ivan Romanovich Timoshenko
- Date of birth: 9 May 1999 (age 27)
- Place of birth: Stavropol, Russia
- Height: 1.88 m (6 ft 2 in)
- Position: Forward

Team information
- Current team: Rodina Moscow
- Number: 99

Youth career
- –2014: Kozhany Myach Roman Pavlyuchenko
- 2014–2015: DYuSSh Football Stavropol
- 2015–2018: SUOR Stavropol

Senior career*
Years	Team	Apps	(Gls)
2017	UOR Stavropol		
2018	Elektroavtomatika Stavropol		
2019–2020	Veles Moscow	17	(1)
2020–2021	Chernomorets Novorossiysk	24	(13)
2021–2022	Železiarne Podbrezová	13	(4)
2022	Chernomorets Novorossiysk	14	(16)
2022–	Rodina Moscow	115	(42)
2024–2025	→ Akron Tolyatti (loan)	11	(1)
- * Club domestic league appearances and goals as of 22 November 2026

Ivan Romanovich Timoshenko (Russian: Иван Романович Тимошенко; born 9 May 1999) is a Russian football player who plays as a forward for Rodina Moscow.

== Career ==
On 17 July 2024, Timoshenko joined Akron Tolyatti on loan.

He made his Russian Premier League debut for Akron on 20 July 2024 in a game against Lokomotiv Moscow.

On 9 January 2025, the loan to Akron was terminated early.

== Career statistics ==
As of match played 22 November 2026

Appearances and goals by club, season and competition
Club	Season	League			Cup		Other		Total	
Club	Season	Division	Apps	Goals	Apps	Goals	Apps	Goals	Apps	Goals
Veles Moscow	2018–19	Russian Second League	7	0	0	0	—		7	0
Veles Moscow	2019–20	Russian Second League	10	1	2	0	—		12	1
Veles Moscow	Total		17	1	2	0	—		19	1
Chernomorets Novorossiysk	2020–21	Russian Second League	24	13	4	0	—		28	13
Železiarne Podbrezová	2021–22	2. Liga	13	4	1	1	—		14	5
Chernomorets Novorossiysk	2021–22	Russian Second League	14	16	—		—		14	16
Rodina Moscow	2022–23	Russian First League	30	14	2	1	2 (Note: Appearances in promotion play-offs)	1	34	16
Rodina Moscow	2023–24	Russian First League	28	14	3	1	—		31	15
Rodina Moscow	2024–25	Russian First League	11	1	—		—		11	1
Rodina Moscow	2025–26	Russian First League	33	11	1	0	—		34	11
Rodina Moscow	2026–27	Russian Premier League	13	2	3	3	—		16	5
Rodina Moscow	Total		115	42	9	5	2	1	126	48
Akron Tolyatti (loan)	2024–25	Russian Premier League	11	1	5	1	—		16	2
Career total			194	77	21	7	2	1	217	85
