= Vladimir Khubulov =

Russian footballer (born 2001)

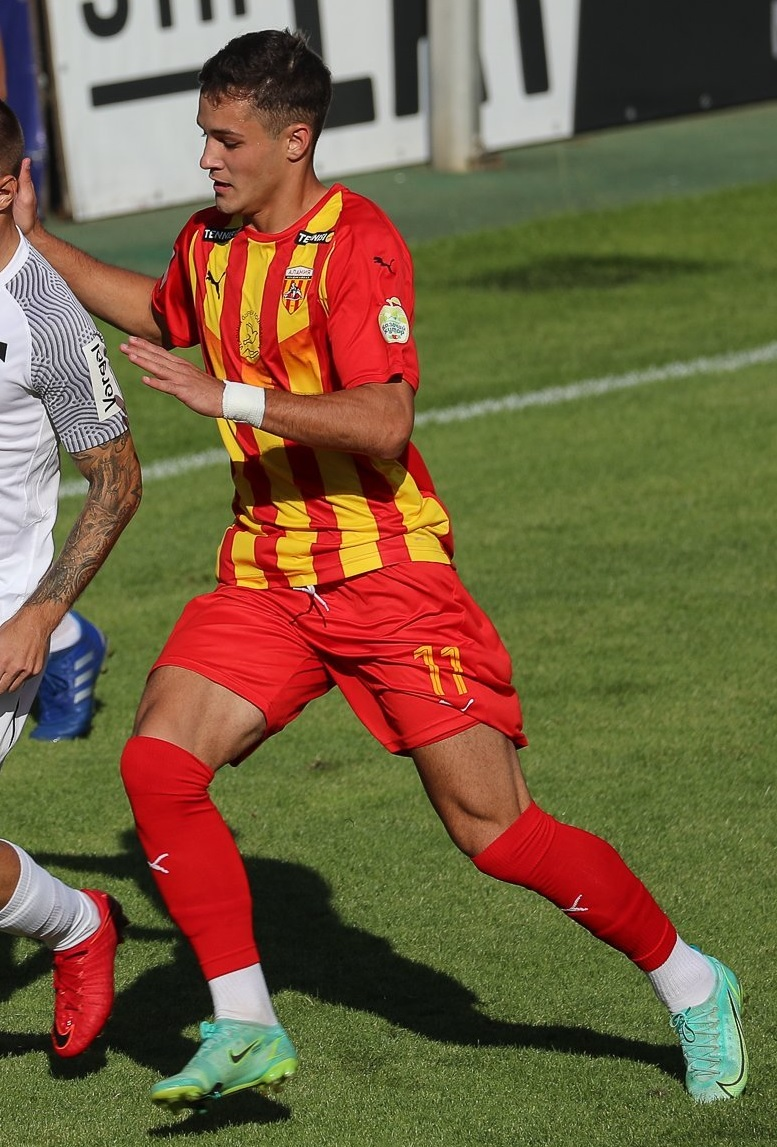
- Khubulov with Alania in 2021

Personal information
- Full name: Vladimir Alekseyevich Khubulov
- Date of birth: 2 March 2001 (age 25)
- Place of birth: Vladikavkaz, Russia
- Height: 1.79 m (5 ft 10 in)
- Positions: Centre forward; left winger

Team information
- Current team: Dynamo Makhachkala
- Number: 8

Youth career
- –2013: Alania Vladikavkaz
- 2013–2016: Krasnodar
- 2017–2020: Akhmat Grozny
- 2019–2020: → Zenit St. Petersburg (loan)

Senior career*
Years	Team	Apps	(Gls)
2020–2022	Alania Vladikavkaz	54	(9)
2022–2026	Krylia Sovetov Samara	32	(2)
2023	→ Khimki (loan)	8	(1)
2024–2025	→ Akron Tolyatti (loan)	24	(5)
2026–	Dynamo Makhachkala	6	(0)

International career^{‡}
2018	Russia U-17	5	(1)
2018	Russia U-18	4	(0)
- * Club domestic league appearances and goals as of 10 October 2026 ‡ National team caps and goals as of 7 September 2018

Vladimir Alekseyevich Khubulov (Russian: Владимир Алексеевич Хубулов; born 2 March 2001) is a Russian football player who plays a centre-forward or left winger for Dynamo Makhachkala. He also was deployed in other attacking positions in his career.

== Club career ==
He made his debut in the Russian Football National League for Alania Vladikavkaz on 9 September 2020 in a game against Irtysh Omsk.

On 15 July 2022, Khubulov signed a four-year contract with Krylia Sovetov Samara. He made his Russian Premier League debut for Krylia Sovetov on 16 July 2022 against Orenburg. On 22 February 2023, Khubulov joined Khimki on loan until the end of the season.

On 6 August 2024, Khubulov was loaned by Akron Tolyatti. He left Krylia Sovetov in June 2026 as his contract expired.

On 13 July 2026, Khubulov signed a two-season contract with Dynamo Makhachkala.

== International career ==
Khubulov was first called up to the Russia national football team for a training camp in September 2023.

== Issues ==
In July 2021 Russian tennis player Daria Kasatkina published a screenshot of the Instagram direct messages, where Vladimir rudely makes claims to her for the lost match. The media suggested that player bet on Kasatkina win and was very upset.

== Career statistics ==
As of match played 29 October 2026

Appearances and goals by club, season and competition
Club	Season	League			Russian Cup		Total	
Club	Season	Division	Apps	Goals	Apps	Goals	Apps	Goals
Alania Vladikavkaz	2020–21	Russian First League	25	2	1	0	26	2
Alania Vladikavkaz	2021–22	Russian First League	29	7	3	1	32	8
Alania Vladikavkaz	Total		54	9	4	1	58	10
Krylia Sovetov Samara	2022–23	Russian Premier League	13	0	4	0	17	0
Krylia Sovetov Samara	2023–24	Russian Premier League	14	2	4	1	18	3
Krylia Sovetov Samara	2025–26	Russian Premier League	5	0	4	0	9	0
Krylia Sovetov Samara	Total		32	2	12	1	44	3
Khimki (loan)	2022–23	Russian Premier League	8	1	0	0	8	1
Akron Tolyatti (loan)	2024–25	Russian Premier League	24	5	5	1	29	6
Dynamo Makhachkala	2026–27	Russian Premier League	6	0	3	1	9	1
Career total			124	17	24	4	148	21
