= Nikita Baranok =

Belarusian footballer

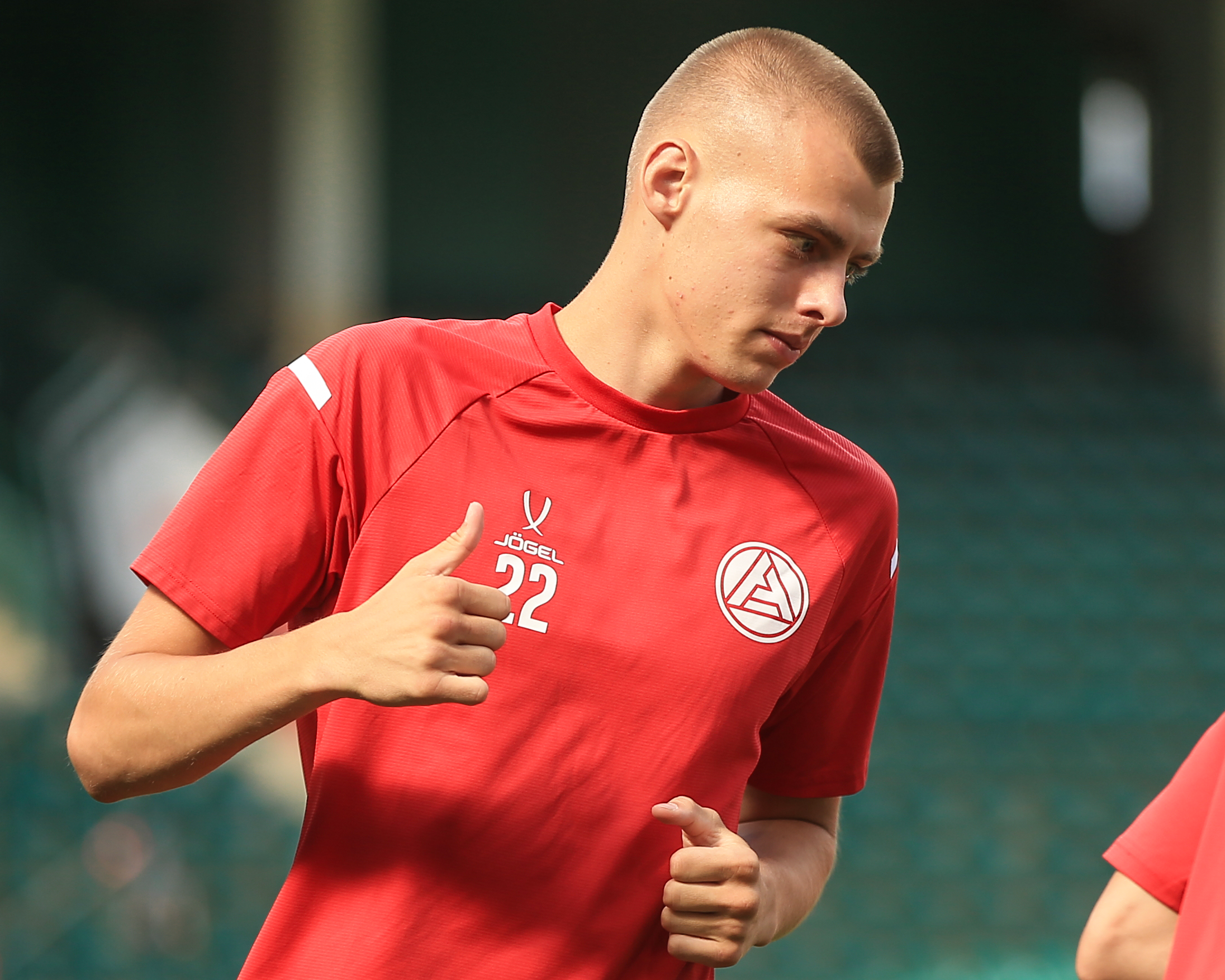

Personal information
- Full name: Nikita Andreyevich Baranok
- Date of birth: 31 March 2004 (age 22)
- Place of birth: Vitebsk, Belarus
- Height: 1.89 m (6 ft 2 in)
- Position: Centre-back

Team information
- Current team: Maxline Vitebsk
- Number: 3

Youth career
- –2021: RUOR Minsk

Senior career*
| Years | Team | Apps | (Gls) |
| 2022 | Vitebsk | 20 | (2) |
| 2023–2024 | Shakhtyor Soligorsk | 28 | (0) |
| 2024–2026 | Akron Tolyatti | 0 | (0) |
| 2025 | → Maxline Vitebsk (loan) | 25 | (5) |
| 2026– | Maxline Vitebsk | 10 | (1) |

International career^{‡}
| 2022 | Belarus U19 | 5 | (1) |
| 2022– | Belarus U21 | 17 | (3) |
- * Club domestic league appearances and goals as of 4 July 2026 ‡ National team caps and goals as of 7 June 2025

Nikita Andreyevich Baranok (Belarusian: Мікіта Андрэевіч Баранок; Russian: Никита Андреевич Баранок; born 31 March 2004) is a Belarusian football player who plays as a centre-back for Belarusian Premier League club Maxline Vitebsk.

== Career ==
On 16 July 2024, Baranok signed with the Russian Premier League newcomers Akron Tolyatti.

He made his debut for Akron on 30 July 2024 in a Russian Cup game against Rubin Kazan.

On 26 January 2025, Baranok moved on loan to Maxline Vitebsk. On 11 March 2026, Baranok returned to Maxline on a permanent basis.

== Career statistics ==
As of match played 4 July 2026

Appearances and goals by club, season and competition
| Club | Season | League | | | National cup | | Other | | Total | |
| Club | Season | Division | Apps | Goals | Apps | Goals | Apps | Goals | Apps | Goals |
|---|---|---|---|---|---|---|---|---|---|---|
| Vitebsk | 2022 | Belarusian Premier League | 20 | 2 | 1 | 0 | 0 | 0 | 21 | 2 |
| Shakhtyor Soligorsk | 2023 | Belarusian Premier League | 13 | 0 | 2 | 0 | 1 (Note: Appearance in Belarusian Super Cup) | 0 | 16 | 0 |
| Shakhtyor Soligorsk | 2024 | Belarusian Premier League | 15 | 0 | 2 | 0 | — | | 17 | 0 |
| Shakhtyor Soligorsk | Total | | 28 | 0 | 4 | 0 | 1 | 0 | 33 | 0 |
| Akron Togliatti | 2024–25 | Russian Premier League | 0 | 0 | 7 | 0 | — | | 7 | 0 |
| Akron Togliatti | 2025–26 | Russian Premier League | 0 | 0 | — | | — | | 0 | 0 |
| Akron Togliatti | Total | | 0 | 0 | 7 | 0 | — | | 7 | 0 |
| Maxline Vitebsk (loan) | 2025 | Belarusian Premier League | 25 | 5 | 3 | 1 | — | | 28 | 6 |
| Maxline Vitebsk | 2026 | Belarusian Premier League | 10 | 1 | 1 | 0 | — | | 11 | 1 |
| Career total | | | 83 | 8 | 12 | 1 | 1 | 0 | 103 | 9 |
