= Kirill Danilin =

Russian footballer

Personal information
- Full name: Kirill Sergeyevich Danilin
- Date of birth: 13 November 2002 (age 23)
- Place of birth: Khimki, Russia
- Height: 1.70 m (5 ft 7 in)
- Position: Midfielder

Team information
- Current team: Gomel
- Number: 23

Youth career
- –2019: Khimki

Senior career*
Years	Team	Apps	(Gls)
2019–2021	Rodina Moscow	0	(0)
2022	Tuapse	11	(1)
2022–2023	Chernomorets Novorossiysk	31	(2)
2023–2026	Akron Tolyatti	55	(5)
2025–2026	→ Torpedo Moscow (loan)	14	(1)
2026	→ Gomel (loan)	14	(2)
2026–	Gomel	0	(0)
- * Club domestic league appearances and goals as of 2 July 2026

Kirill Sergeyevich Danilin (Russian: Кирилл Сергеевич Данилин; born 13 November 2002) is a Russian footballer who plays as a midfielder for Belarusian Premier League club Gomel.

== Club career ==
Danilin made his debut in the Russian Second League for Tuapse on 8 March 2022 in a game against Alania-2 Vladikavkaz.

He made his debut in the Russian First League for Akron Tolyatti on 23 July 2023 in a game against Volgar Astrakhan.

Danilin made his debut in the Russian Premier League for Akron Tolyatti on 20 July 2024 in a game against Lokomotiv Moscow.

Danilin's contract with Akron was mutually terminated on 19 July 2026.

== Career statistics ==
As of 29 July 2025

Club	Season	League			Cup		Continental		Other		Total	
Club	Season	Division	Apps	Goals	Apps	Goals	Apps	Goals	Apps	Goals	Apps	Goals
Rodina Moscow	2019–20	Russian Second League	0	0	0	0	–		–		0	0
Tuapse	2021–22	Russian Second League	11	1	0	0	–		–		11	1
Chernomorets Novorossiysk	2022–23	Russian Second League	31	2	3	0	–		–		34	2
Akron Tolyatti	2023–24	Russian First League	30	4	2	0	–		2 (Note: Appearances in the promotion play-offs)	1	34	5
Akron Tolyatti	2024–25	Russian Premier League	25	1	4	0	–		–		29	1
Akron Tolyatti	2025–26	Russian Premier League	0	0	1	0	–		–		1	0
Akron Tolyatti	Total		55	5	7	0	0	0	2	1	64	6
Career total			97	8	10	0	0	0	2	1	109	9
