= Bojan Dimoski =

Macedonian footballer

Personal information
- Date of birth: 23 November 2001 (age 24)
- Place of birth: Prilep, Macedonia
- Height: 1.76 m (5 ft 9 in)
- Positions: Left back; defensive midfielder

Team information
- Current team: Shkëndija

Youth career
- –2016: Teteks
- 2016–2019: Vardar

Senior career*
Years	Team	Apps	(Gls)
2019–2020	Vardar	14	(0)
2020–2023	Akademija Pandev	70	(3)
2023–2026	Akron Tolyatti	42	(0)
2025	→ Partizan (loan)	3	(0)
2025–2026	→ TSC (loan)	6	(0)
2026–	Shkëndija	0	(0)

International career^{‡}
2018	Macedonia U18	4	(0)
2019	North Macedonia U19	5	(0)
2021–2022	North Macedonia U21	6	(1)
2022–	North Macedonia	21	(0)
- * Club domestic league appearances and goals as of 13 June 2026 ‡ National team caps and goals as of 27 March 2025

Bojan Dimoski (Macedonian: Бојан Димоски; born 23 November 2001) is a Macedonian professional footballer who plays as a left back as well as a defensive midfielder for Shkëndija.

== Career ==
=== Club career ===
Dimoski made his senior football debut on 24 February 2019, at the age of 17, when he entered the game for Vardar at the start of the second half in a First Macedonian Football League match against Renova. That season, he went on to play four more games, earning him a permanent promotion from the youth to the senior team. Bojan became a regular player in the 2019–20 season, which led to his transfer to Akademija Pandev.

On 14 June 2023, Dimoski signed a long-term contract with Russian First League club Akron Tolyatti. On 8 February 2025, Dimoski was loaned to Serbian club Partizan.

On 3 September 2025, Dimoski returned to Serbia and signed with TSC on loan.

On 19 June 2026, Dimoski transferred to Shkëndija.

=== International ===
Ever since 2018 Dimoski has been regular at most of North Macedonia's national youth teams.

He made his debut for North Macedonia national football team on 12 June 2022 in a 2022–23 UEFA Nations League C against Gibraltar.

== Career statistics ==
=== Club ===
As of match played 17 May 2025

Appearances and goals by club, season and competition
Club	Season	League			Cup		Continental		Other		Total	
Club	Season	Division	Apps	Goals	Apps	Goals	Apps	Goals	Apps	Goals	Apps	Goals
Vardar	2018–19	Macedonian First Football League	5	0	—		—		—		5	0
Vardar	2019–20	Macedonian First Football League	9	0	—		—		—		9	0
Vardar	Total		14	0	—		—		—		14	0
Akademija Pandev	2020–21	Macedonian First Football League	30	1	3	0	—		—		33	1
Akademija Pandev	2021–22	Macedonian First Football League	14	2	0	0	—		—		14	2
Akademija Pandev	2022–23	Macedonian First Football League	26	0	1	0	0	0	—		27	0
Akademija Pandev	Total		70	3	4	0	0	0	0	0	74	3
Akron Tolyatti	2023–24	Russian First League	24	0	2	0	—		2 (Note: Appearances in the promotion play-offs)	0	28	0
Akron Tolyatti	2024–25	Russian Premier League	9	0	5	0	—		—		14	0
Akron Tolyatti	Total		33	0	7	0	—		2	0	42	0
Partizan (loan)	2024–25	Serbian SuperLiga	3	0	1	0	—		—		4	0
Career total			120	3	12	0	0	0	2	0	134	3

=== International ===
As of match played 22 March 2025

Appearances and goals by national team and year
National team	Year	Apps	Goals
North Macedonia	2022	2	0
North Macedonia	2023	6	0
North Macedonia	2024	10	0
North Macedonia	2025	2	0
Total		20	0
