= Sergey Volkov (footballer, born 1995) =

Russian footballer

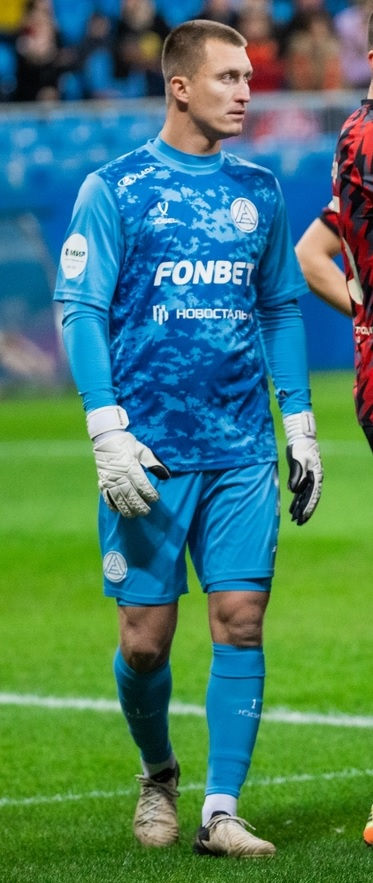
- Volkov with Akron Tolyatti in 2024

Personal information
- Full name: Sergey Andreyevich Volkov
- Date of birth: 10 May 1995 (age 31)
- Place of birth: Tolyatti, Russia
- Height: 1.87 m (6 ft 1 1/2 in)
- Position: Goalkeeper

Team information
- Current team: Rodina Moscow
- Number: 13

Youth career
- Konoplyov football academy

Senior career*
Years	Team	Apps	(Gls)
2011–2012	Akademiya-D Tolyatti		
2013–2016	Lada-Tolyatti	36	(0)
2017	Rubin Yalta		
2017	Lada-Tolyatti	6	(0)
2018	Akron Tolyatti (amateur)		
2019–2026	Akron Tolyatti	147	(0)
2025–2026	→ Rodina Moscow (loan)	30	(0)
2026–	Rodina Moscow	15	(0)
- * Club domestic league appearances and goals as of 22 November 2026

Sergey Andreyevich Volkov (Russian: Сергей Андреевич Волков; born 10 May 1995) is a Russian football player who plays as a goalkeeper for Rodina Moscow.

== Club career ==
Volkov made his debut in the Russian Football National League for Akron Tolyatti on 8 August 2020 in a game against Shinnik Yaroslavl.

He made his Russian Premier League debut for Akron Tolyatti on 20 July 2024 in a game against Lokomotiv Moscow.

On 15 August 2025, Volkov was loaned to Rodina Moscow. On 11 June 2026, Rodina made the transfer permanent and signed a two-year contract with Volkov.

== Career statistics ==
As of match played 22 November 2026

Appearances and goals by club, season and competition
Club	Season	League			Cup		Other		Total	
Club	Season	Division	Apps	Goals	Apps	Goals	Apps	Goals	Apps	Goals
Lada-Tolyatti	2014–15	Russian Second League	16	0	0	0	—		16	0
Lada-Tolyatti	2015–16	Russian Second League	16	0	0	0	—		16	0
Lada-Tolyatti	2016–17	Russian Second League	4	0	0	0	—		4	0
Lada-Tolyatti	Total		36	0	0	0	—		36	0
Rubin Yalta	2016–17	Crimean Premier League	—		—		—		—	
Lada-Tolyatti	2017–18	Russian Second League	6	0	1	0	—		7	0
Akron Tolyatti	2019–20	Russian Second League	6	0	3	0	—		9	0
Akron Tolyatti	2020–21	Russian First League	21	0	1	0	—		22	0
Akron Tolyatti	2021–22	Russian First League	35	0	1	0	—		36	0
Akron Tolyatti	2022–23	Russian First League	33	0	7	0	—		40	0
Akron Tolyatti	2023–24	Russian First League	34	0	0	0	2 (Note: Appearances in promotion play-offs)	0	36	0
Akron Tolyatti	2024–25	Russian Premier League	18	0	4	0	—		22	0
Akron Tolyatti	Total		147	0	16	0	2	0	165	0
Rodina Moscow (loan)	2025–26	Russian First League	30	0	0	0	—		30	0
Rodina Moscow	2026–27	Russian Premier League	15	0	2	0	—		17	0
Rodina Moscow	Club total		45	0	2	0	0	0	47	0
Career total			233	0	19	0	2	0	254	0
