= Artur Galoyan =

Armenian footballer

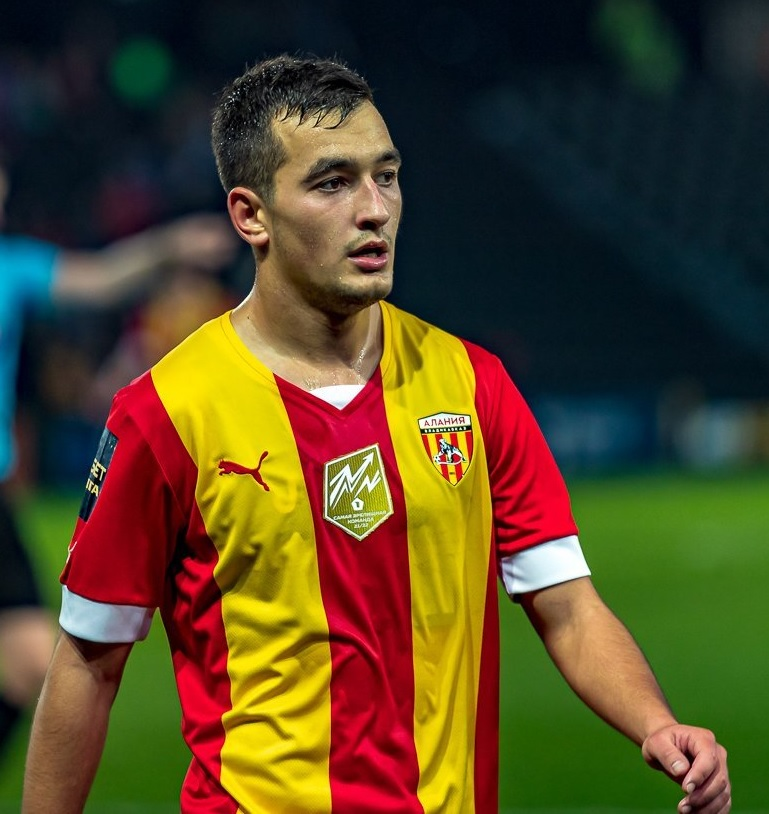
- Galoyan with Alania Vladikavkaz in 2022

Personal information
- Full name: Artur Feliksovich Galoyan
- Date of birth: 25 June 1999 (age 27)
- Place of birth: Moscow, Russia
- Height: 1.75 m (5 ft 9 in)
- Position: Attacking midfielder

Team information
- Current team: Torpedo Moscow
- Number: 21

Youth career
- 2006–2011: Timiryazevets Moscow
- 2011–2017: Torpedo Moscow

Senior career*
Years	Team	Apps	(Gls)
2017–2020	Torpedo Moscow	64	(6)
2020–2022	Veles Moscow	74	(18)
2022–2023	Alania Vladikavkaz	30	(8)
2023	Baltika Kaliningrad	16	(0)
2024–2025	Akron Tolyatti	21	(2)
2025–	Torpedo Moscow	19	(0)
2026	→ Shinnik Yaroslavl (loan)	13	(3)

International career^{‡}
2022–	Armenia	1	(0)
- * Club domestic league appearances and goals as of 16 May 2026 ‡ National team caps and goals as of 19 November 2022

Artur Feliksovich Galoyan (Armenian: Արթուր Ֆելիքսի Գալոյան; Russian: Артур Феликсович Галоян; born 25 June 1999) is a professional football player who plays as an attacking midfielder for Torpedo Moscow. Born in Russia, he represents the Armenia national team.

== Club career ==
He made his debut in the Russian Professional Football League for Torpedo Moscow on 27 July 2017 in a game against Metallurg Lipetsk. He made his Russian Football National League debut for Torpedo on 7 July 2019 in a game against Fakel Voronezh.

Galoyan left Torpedo and joined Veles at June 2020. At July 2022 he became a player of Alania Vladikavkaz.

On 16 June 2023, Galoyan signed a four-year contract with the Russian Premier League club Baltika Kaliningrad. He made his RPL debut for Baltika on 23 July 2023 in a game against Sochi.

On 30 December 2023, Galoyan moved to Akron Tolyatti.

On 18 July 2025, Galoyan returned to Torpedo Moscow.

== International career ==
Born in Russia, Galoyan is of Armenian descent. On 12 April 2022, he received Armenian citizenship.

He debuted with the Armenia national team in a friendly 2–0 loss to Albania on 19 November 2022.

== Career statistics ==
=== Club ===
As of 24 May 2025

Club	Season	League			Cup		Continental		Total	
Club	Season	Division	Apps	Goals	Apps	Goals	Apps	Goals	Apps	Goals
Torpedo Moscow	2016–17	Russian Second League	0	0	–		–		0	0
Torpedo Moscow	2017–18	Russian Second League	18	1	2	0	–		20	1
Torpedo Moscow	2018–19	Russian Second League	20	2	0	0	–		20	2
Torpedo Moscow	2019–20	Russian First League	26	3	3	0	–		29	3
Torpedo Moscow	Total		64	6	5	0	0	0	69	6
Veles Moscow	2020–21	Russian First League	39	5	2	2	–		41	7
Veles Moscow	2021–22	Russian First League	35	13	2	2	–		37	15
Veles Moscow	Total		74	18	4	4	0	0	78	22
Alania Vladikavkaz	2022–23	Russian First League	30	8	0	0	–		30	8
Baltika Kaliningrad	2023–24	Russian Premier League	16	0	7	1	–		23	1
Akron Tolyatti	2023–24	Russian First League	14	1	–		–		14	1
Akron Tolyatti	2024–25	Russian Premier League	7	1	4	0	–		11	1
Akron Tolyatti	Total		21	2	4	0	–		25	2
Career total			205	34	20	5	0	0	225	39

=== International ===
As of match played 19 November 2022

Appearances and goals by national team and year
National team	Year	Apps	Goals
Armenia	2022	1	0
Total		1	0
