= Soltmurad Bakayev =

Russian football player

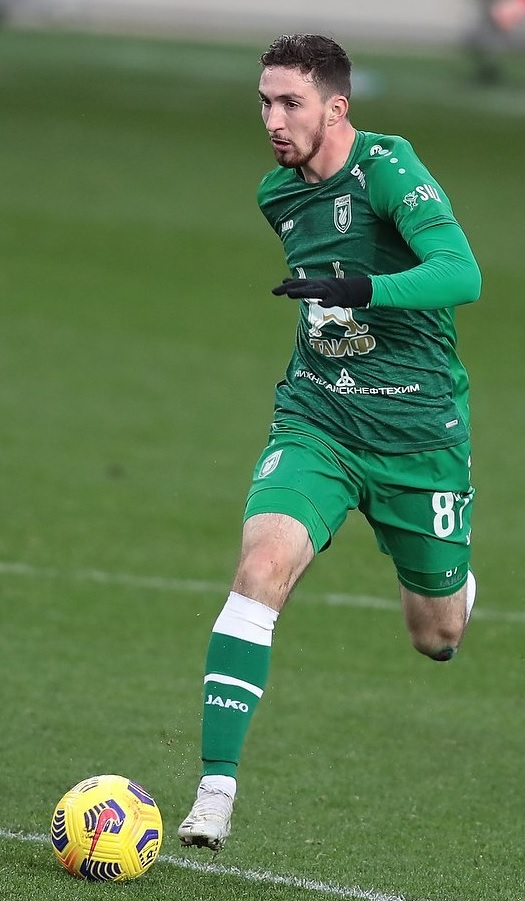
- Bakayev with Rubin in 2020

Personal information
- Full name: Soltmurad Dzhabrailovich Bakayev
- Date of birth: 5 August 1999 (age 27)
- Place of birth: Nazran, Russia
- Height: 1.76 m (5 ft 9 in)
- Position: Winger

Team information
- Current team: Rodina Moscow
- Number: 17

Youth career
- –2019: Spartak Moscow

Senior career*
Years	Team	Apps	(Gls)
2018–2019	Spartak-2 Moscow	55	(9)
2019	Spartak Moscow	2	(0)
2020–2024	Rubin Kazan	83	(6)
2023–2024	→ Rodina Moscow (loan)	22	(1)
2024–2026	Akron Tolyatti	38	(3)
2026–	Rodina Moscow	24	(2)

International career^{‡}
2017	Russia U-20	1	(0)
2020	Russia U-21	2	(1)
- * Club domestic league appearances and goals as of 22 November 2026 ‡ National team caps and goals as of 17 November 2020

Soltmurad Dzhabrailovich Bakayev (Russian: Солтмурад Джабраилович Бакаев; born 5 August 1999) is a Russian football player who plays for Rodina Moscow. His primary position is left winger, and he played as right winger as well.

== Club career ==
He made his debut in the Russian Football National League for Spartak-2 Moscow on 17 July 2018 in a game against Sochi.

He made his Russian Premier League debut for Spartak on 25 August 2019 in a game against Krylia Sovetov Samara.

On 22 January 2020 he signed a 5-year contract with Rubin Kazan. On 14 September 2023, Bakayev was loaned by Rodina Moscow.

On 2 July 2024, Bakayev signed with Akron Tolyatti.

On 16 February 2026, Bakayev returned to Rodina Moscow.

== Personal life ==
His older brother Zelimkhan Bakayev is also a footballer.

== Career statistics ==
As of match played 22 November 2026

Appearances and goals by club, season and competition
Club	Season	League			Cup		Europe		Other		Total	
Club	Season	Division	Apps	Goals	Apps	Goals	Apps	Goals	Apps	Goals	Apps	Goals
Spartak-2 Moscow	2018–19	Russian First League	37	5	—		—		5 (Note: Appearances in FNL Cup)	1	42	6
Spartak-2 Moscow	2019–20	Russian First League	18	4	—		—		—		18	4
Spartak-2 Moscow	Total		55	9	—		—		5	1	60	10
Spartak Moscow	2019–20	Russian Premier League	2	0	0	0	1 (Note: Appearance in UEFA Europa League)	0	—		3	0
Rubin Kazan	2019–20	Russian Premier League	10	1	—		—		—		10	1
Rubin Kazan	2020–21	Russian Premier League	28	2	2	0	—		—		30	2
Rubin Kazan	2021–22	Russian Premier League	29	2	2	0	2 (Note: Appearances in UEFA Europa Conference League)	0	—		33	2
Rubin Kazan	2022–23	Russian First League	15	1	1	0	—		—		16	1
Rubin Kazan	2023–24	Russian Premier League	1	0	2	0	—		—		3	0
Rubin Kazan	Total		83	6	7	0	2	0	0	0	92	6
Rodina Moscow (loan)	2023–24	Russian First League	22	1	4	0	—		—		26	1
Akron Tolyatti	2024–25	Russian Premier League	25	3	5	0	—		—		30	3
Akron Tolyatti	2025–26	Russian Premier League	13	0	5	1	—		—		18	1
Akron Tolyatti	Total		38	3	10	1	0	0	0	0	48	4
Rodina Moscow	2025–26	Russian First League	11	1	—		—		—		11	1
Rodina Moscow	2026–27	Russian Premier League	13	1	4	0	—		—		17	1
Rodina Moscow	Total		24	2	4	0	0	0	0	0	28	2
Rodina Moscow	Club total		46	3	8	0	0	0	0	0	54	3
Career total			224	21	25	1	3	0	5	1	257	23
