= Gilson Benchimol =

Cape Verdean footballer (born 2001)

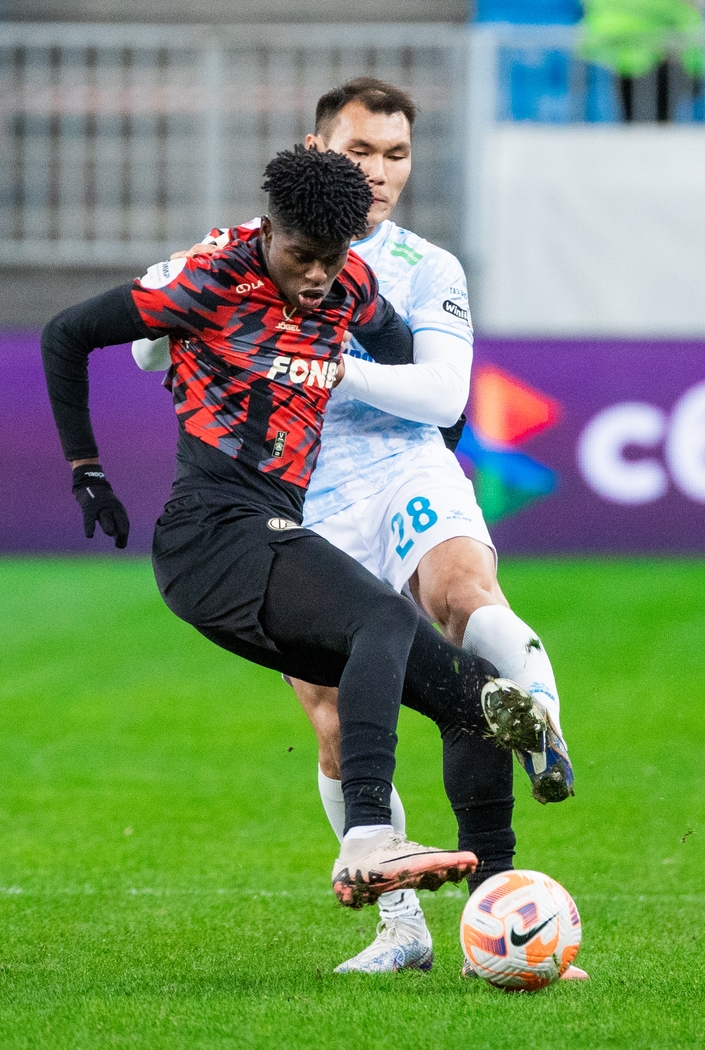
- Benchimol with Akron Tolyatti in 2024

Personal information
- Full name: Gilson Benchimol Tavares
- Date of birth: 29 December 2001 (age 24)
- Place of birth: Praia, Cape Verde
- Height: 1.87 m (6 ft 2 in)
- Position: Striker

Team information
- Current team: Akron Tolyatti
- Number: 7

Youth career
- 2009–2012: Damaiense
- 2012–2014: CR Foot
- 2014–2015: Linda-a-Velha
- 2015–2016: Real SC
- 2016–2020: Damaiense
- 2020–2021: Estoril

Senior career*
Years	Team	Apps	(Gls)
2021–2024	Estoril	12	(0)
2023–2024	→ Benfica B (loan)	31	(8)
2024–	Akron Tolyatti	50	(12)

International career^{‡}
2020–	Cape Verde	26	(7)
- * Club domestic league appearances and goals as of 21 November 2026 ‡ National team caps and goals as of 29 September 2026

Gilson Benchimol Tavares (Portuguese: [ˈʒil.sɔn bẽ.ʃi.ˈmɔl ta.ˈva.ɾɨʃ]; born 29 December 2001) is a Cape Verdean professional footballer who plays as a striker for Russian club Akron Tolyatti and the Cape Verde national team.

== Club career ==
On 22 July 2024, Benchimol signed a long-term contract with Russian Premier League club Akron Tolyatti.

== International career ==
Benchimol debuted for the Cape Verde national team in a 2–1 friendly loss to Guinea on 10 October 2020. He scored a hat-trick in a game against the Liechtenstein national football team on 25 March 2022.

He was named in the roster for the 2021 Africa Cup of Nations when the team reached the round of 16.

On 18 May 2026, he was called up by Cape Verde's head coach Bubista for the 2026 FIFA World Cup.

== Career statistics ==
=== Club ===
As of match played 21 November 2026

Appearances and goals by club, season and competition
Club	Season	League			Cup		League Cup		Other		Total	
Club	Season	Division	Apps	Goals	Apps	Goals	Apps	Goals	Apps	Goals	Apps	Goals
Estoril	2021–22	Primeira Liga	1	0	0	0	1	0	—		2	0
Estoril	2022–23	Primeira Liga	11	0	2	0	3	0	—		15	0
Estoril	Total		12	0	2	0	4	0	0	0	17	0
Benfica B (loan)	2022–23	Liga Portugal 2	16	3	—		—		—		16	3
Benfica B (loan)	2023–24	Liga Portugal 2	15	5	—		—		—		15	5
Benfica B (loan)	Total		31	8	0	0	0	0	0	0	31	8
Akron Togliatti	2024–25	Russian Premier League	19	2	6	0	—		—		25	2
Akron Togliatti	2025–26	Russian Premier League	20	6	4	4	—		2 (Note: Appearance in relegation play-offs)	2	26	12
Akron Togliatti	2026–27	Russian Premier League	11	4	2	0	—		—		13	4
Akron Togliatti	Total		50	12	12	4	0	0	2	2	64	18
Career total			93	20	14	4	4	0	2	2	113	26

=== International ===
As of match played 29 September 2026

Appearances and goals by national team and year
National team	Year	Apps	Goals
Cape Verde	2020	1	0
Cape Verde	2021	4	0
Cape Verde	2022	2	3
Cape Verde	2023	3	1
Cape Verde	2024	11	1
Cape Verde	2026	5	2
Total		26	7

Scores and results list Cape Verde's goal tally first.

List of international goals scored by Gilson Benchimol
No.	Date	Venue	Opponent	Score	Result	Competition
1.	25 March 2022	Pinatar Arena, San Pedro del Pinatar, Spain	Liechtenstein	1–0	6–0	Friendly
2.	25 March 2022	Pinatar Arena, San Pedro del Pinatar, Spain	Liechtenstein	3–0	6–0	Friendly
3.	25 March 2022	Pinatar Arena, San Pedro del Pinatar, Spain	Liechtenstein	4–0	6–0	Friendly
4.	10 September 2023	Kégué Stadium, Lomé, Togo	Togo	2–0	3–2	2023 Africa Cup of Nations qualification
5.	22 January 2024	Felix Houphouet Boigny Stadium, Abidjan, Ivory Coast	Egypt	1–0	2–2	2023 Africa Cup of Nations
6.	31 May 2026	Estádio do Restelo, Lisbon, Portugal	Serbia	3–0	3–0	Friendly
7.	29 September 2026	Estádio Nacional de Cabo Verde, Praia, Cape Verde	Rwanda	1–0	1–2	2027 Africa Cup of Nations qualification
