= Roberto Fernández (Bolivian footballer) =

Bolivian footballer (born 1999)

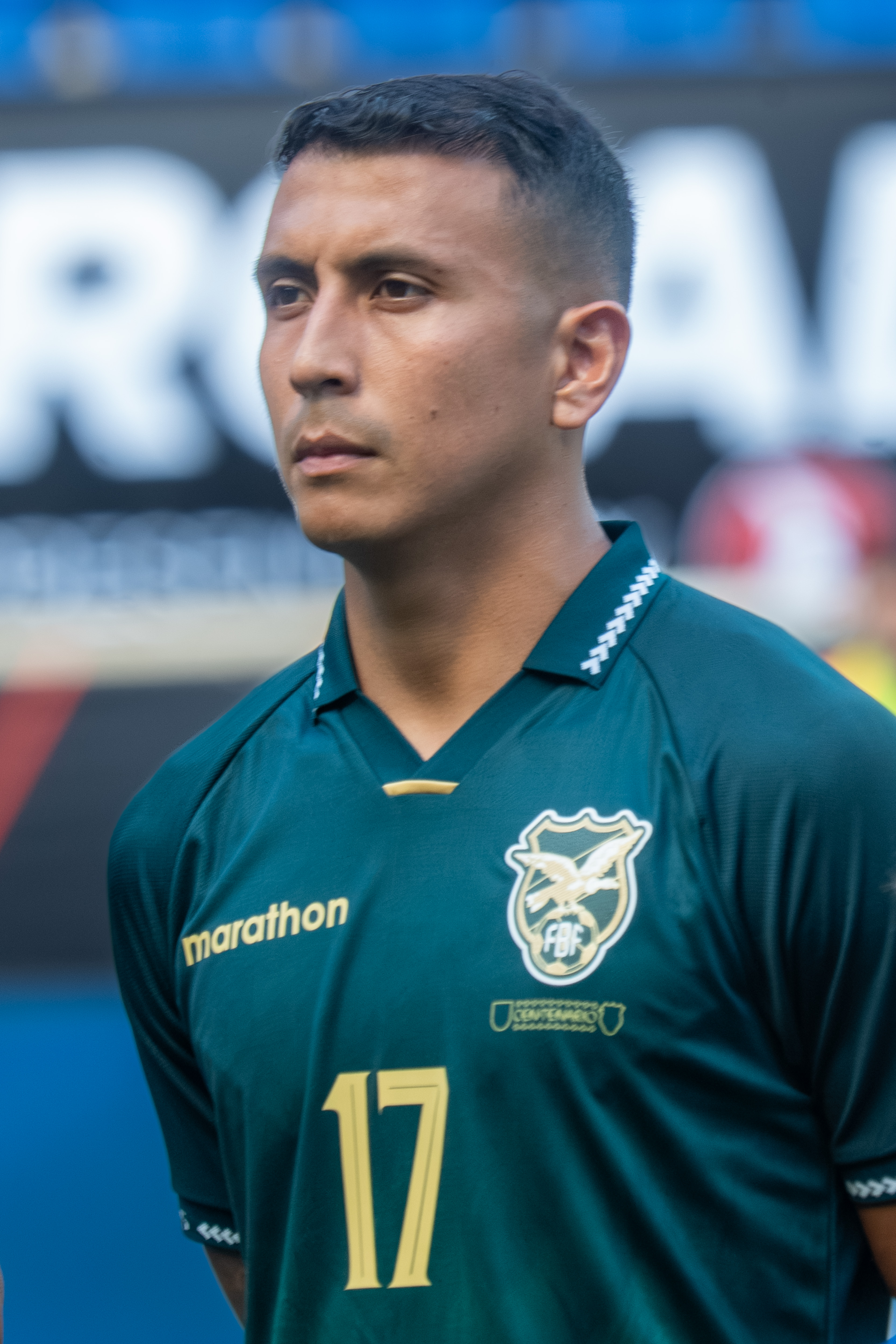
- Fernández with Bolivia in 2026

Personal information
- Full name: Roberto Carlos Fernández Toro
- Date of birth: 12 July 1999 (age 27)
- Place of birth: Camiri, Bolivia
- Height: 1.73 m (5 ft 8 in)
- Positions: Left midfielder; left back

Team information
- Current team: Akron Tolyatti
- Number: 21

Youth career
- 2012–2018: Blooming

Senior career*
Years	Team	Apps	(Gls)
2018–2019	Blooming	53	(3)
2019	Cultural Leonesa	13	(0)
2020–2025	Bolívar	102	(16)
2023–2024	→ Baltika Kaliningrad (loan)	29	(1)
2024–2025	→ Akron Tolyatti (loan)	19	(0)
2025–	Akron Tolyatti	43	(2)

International career^{‡}
2019	Bolivia U20	4	(0)
2019–2021	Bolivia U23	6	(0)
2019–	Bolivia	59	(1)
- * Club domestic league appearances and goals as of 21 November 2026 ‡ National team caps and goals as of 17 November 2026

Roberto Carlos Fernández Toro (born 12 July 1999) is a Bolivian professional footballer who plays as a left midfielder for Russian Premier League club Akron Tolyatti and the Bolivia national team. He also played as a left back in the past.

== Club career ==
=== Bolívar ===
==== 2023–24: Loan to Baltika Kaliningrad ====
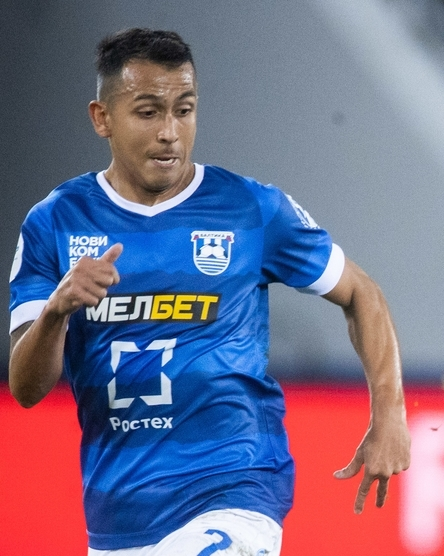
Fernández playing for Baltika Kaliningrad in 2023

On 8 July 2023, Fernández joined Russian Premier League club Baltika Kaliningrad on a season-long loan with an option to buy. He left Baltika on 10 June 2024.

==== 2024–25: Loan to Akron Tolyatti ====
On 1 September 2024, Fernández returned to Russian Premier League and signed with Akron Tolyatti on loan.

=== Akron Tolyatti ===
On 17 June 2025, Akron made the transfer permanent and signed a three-year contract with Fernández.

== International career ==
Fernández represented the national U-20 side at the 2019 South American U-20 Championship. He made his senior debut for the Bolivia national football team in a 1–0 friendly loss to Japan on 26 March 2019.

Later that year, Fernández was included in Bolivia's squad for the 2019 Copa América in Brazil. He appeared in matches against Venezuela and Peru.

In 2021, Fernández participated in the Copa América for the second time, again held in Brazil. During the tournament, he featured in matches against Paraguay, Chile, Argentina, and Uruguay.

On 14 October 2021, in a 2022 FIFA World Cup qualifying match against Paraguay, Fernández scored his first goal for the national team.

== Career statistics ==
=== Club ===
As of match played 21 November 2026

Appearances and goals by club, season and competition
Club	Season	League			Cup		Continental		Other		Total	
Club	Season	Division	Apps	Goals	Apps	Goals	Apps	Goals	Apps	Goals	Apps	Goals
Blooming	2018	Bolivian Primera División	25	0	0	0	—		—		25	0
Blooming	2019	Bolivian Primera División	28	3	0	0	—		—		28	3
Blooming	Total		53	3	0	0	—		—		53	3
Leonesa	2019–20	Segunda División B	13	0	1	0	—		—		14	0
Bolívar	2020	Bolivian Primera División	18	5	0	0	9 (Note: Five appearances in Copa Libertadores, four appearances and one goal in Copa Sudamericana.)	1	—		27	6
Bolívar	2021	Bolivian Primera División	24	5	0	0	10 (Note: Six appearances and one goal in Copa Sudamericana, four appearances and one goal in Copa Libertadores.)	1	—		34	5
Bolívar	2022	Bolivian Primera División	49	6	0	0	4 (Note: Appearances in Copa Libertadores.)	0	5 (Note: Appearances in playoffs)	0	58	6
Bolívar	2023	Bolivian Primera División	0	0	3	1	5	0	—		8	1
Bolívar	2024	Bolivian Primera División	6	0	—		0	0	—		6	0
Bolívar	Total		97	16	3	1	28	2	5	0	133	18
Baltika Kaliningrad (loan)	2023–24	Russian Premier League	29	1	11	1	—		—		40	2
Akron Tolyatti (loan)	2024–25	Russian Premier League	19	0	3	0	—		—		22	0
Akron Tolyatti	2025–26	Russian Premier League	29	1	1	0	—		2 (Note: Appearances in relegation play-offs)	0	32	1
Akron Tolyatti	2026–27	Russian Premier League	14	1	0	0	—		—		14	1
Akron Tolyatti	Total		43	2	1	0	0	0	2	0	46	2
Akron Tolyatti	Club total		62	2	4	0	0	0	2	0	68	2
Career total			254	22	19	2	28	2	7	0	308	26

=== International ===
As of match played 17 November 2026

Appearances and goals by national team and year
National team	Year	Apps	Goals
Bolivia	2019	4	0
Bolivia	2020	1	0
Bolivia	2021	13	1
Bolivia	2022	1	0
Bolivia	2023	8	0
Bolivia	2024	10	0
Bolivia	2025	10	0
Bolivia	2026	8	0
Total		59	1

International goals by date, venue, cap, opponent, score, result and competition
No.	Date	Venue	Cap	Opponent	Score	Result	Competition
1	14 October 2021	Estadio Hernando Siles, La Paz, Bolivia	17	Paraguay	4–0	4–0	2022 FIFA World Cup qualification

== Honours ==
Bolivar

- FBF División Profesional: 2024
- Copa de la División Profesional: 2023
