= Paulo Vitor (footballer, born 2001) =

Brazilian footballer

Personal information
- Full name: Paulo Vitor Leal Sousa Lima
- Date of birth: 19 July 2001 (age 25)
- Place of birth: Imperatriz, Brazil
- Height: 1.90 m (6 ft 3 in)
- Position: Centre-back

Team information
- Current team: Al-Orobah
- Number: 33

Senior career*
Years	Team	Apps	(Gls)
2021	Imperatriz	9	(0)
2022–2023	Botafogo-PB	18	(0)
2022–2023	→ Nacional (loan)	16	(0)
2023–2024	Maguary	0	(0)
2023–2024	→ Nacional (loan)	32	(0)
2024–2026	Akron Tolyatti	17	(0)
2025	→ Vitória de Guimarães (loan)	1	(0)
2025–2026	→ AVS (loan)	17	(0)
2026–	Al-Orobah	0	(0)
- * Club domestic league appearances and goals as of 28 August 2026

Paulo Vitor Leal Sousa Lima, known as Paulo Vitor (born 19 July 2001) is a Brazilian professional football player who plays as a centre-back for Saudi First Division League club Al-Orobah.

== Career ==
On 17 June 2024, Paulo Vitor signed with Akron Tolyatti, recently promoted to the Russian Premier League.

He made his RPL debut for Akron on 20 July 2024 in a game against Lokomotiv Moscow.

On 3 July 2025, Paulo Vitor returned to Portugal and joined Vitória de Guimarães on loan. After making one late substitute appearance for Vitória in the first four games of the Primeira Liga season, Paulo Vitor was loaned to AVS in the same league instead.

On 7 September 2026, Paulo Vitor left Akron by mutual consent.

== Career statistics ==
As of match played 12 March 2025

Appearances and goals by club, season and competition
Club	Season	League			National cup		League Cup		Other		Total	
Club	Season	Division	Apps	Goals	Apps	Goals	Apps	Goals	Apps	Goals	Apps	Goals
Imperatriz	2021	Série D	9	0	0	0	—		2 (Note: Appearances in Copa do Nordeste)	0	11	0
Botafogo	2022	Série C	14	0	0	0	—		9	0	23	0
Nacional (loan)	2022–23	Liga Portugal 2	16	0	0	0	0	0	—		16	0
Maguary	2023	—			—		—		—		0	0
Nacional	2023–24 (loan)	Liga Portugal 2	32	0	3	0	3	0	—		38	0
Akron Tolyatti	2024–25	Russian Premier League	16	0	3	0	—		—		19	0
Career total			87	0	6	0	3	0	11	0	117	0
