= Kenan Pirić =

Bosnian footballer (born 1994)

Personal information
- Date of birth: 7 July 1994 (age 32)
- Place of birth: Tuzla, Bosnia and Herzegovina
- Height: 1.92 m (6 ft 4 in)
- Position: Goalkeeper

Team information
- Current team: Riga FC
- Number: 12

Youth career
- Sloboda Tuzla

Senior career*
Years	Team	Apps	(Gls)
2012–2013	Gradina	16	(0)
2013–2014	Gent	0	(0)
2014–2017	Sloboda Tuzla	60	(0)
2017–2018	Zrinjski Mostar	43	(0)
2018–2021	Maribor	46	(0)
2021	Atromitos	11	(0)
2022	Göztepe	4	(0)
2022–2024	AEK Larnaca	71	(0)
2024–2025	Antalyaspor	30	(0)
2025–2026	Neftçi	28	(0)
2026–	Riga FC	2	(0)

International career
2013–2016	Bosnia and Herzegovina U21	12	(0)
2018–2024	Bosnia and Herzegovina	8	(0)
- * Club domestic league appearances and goals as of 12 November 2026

Kenan Pirić (Bosnian pronunciation: [kěnan pǐriːtɕ]; born 7 July 1994) is a Bosnian professional footballer who plays as a goalkeeper for Latvian club Riga FC.

Pirić started his career at Gradina, before joining Gent in 2013. A year later, he signed with Sloboda Tuzla. In 2017, Pirić moved to Zrinjski Mostar. The following year, he was transferred to Maribor, where he stayed for three years. After a short stint with Atromitos in 2021, he joined Göztepe in early 2022.

A former youth international for Bosnia and Herzegovina, Pirić made his senior international debut in 2018.

== Club career ==
Pirić came through the youth academy of his hometown club Sloboda Tuzla, which he left in June 2012 to join Gradina. He made his professional debut against Velež on 25 August of the same year at the age of 18.

In August 2013, Pirić signed with Belgian team Gent. In the summer of 2014, he returned to Sloboda Tuzla. In February 2017, Pirić moved to Zrinjski Mostar.

On 13 December 2017, Slovenian side Maribor announced that Pirić would join them the following season. He made his competitive debut for the team against Mura on 29 July 2018 and managed to keep a clean sheet. He won his first trophy with Maribor on 15 May 2019, when they were crowned league champions.

In July 2021, Pirić signed a two-year deal with Greek outfit Atromitos. He made his competitive debut for the team against Olympiacos on 12 September, keeping a clean sheet in a goalless draw. In late December, he terminated his contract with Atromitos.

In January 2022, Pirić moved to Turkish side Göztepe on a deal until June 2023. He made his official debut for the club against Konyaspor on 3 April.

In June 2022, he joined Cypriot team AEK Larnaca on a two-year contract.

On 26 July 2025, Pirić signed a two-year contract with Neftçi.

== International career ==
Pirić was a member of the Bosnia and Herzegovina under-21 team. He made seven appearances during the 2017 UEFA European Under-21 Championship qualifiers in 2015 and 2016. He also served as team captain under coach Vlado Jagodić.

In May 2016, Pirić received his first senior call-up, for a friendly game against Spain and the 2016 Kirin Cup, but had to wait until 31 January 2018 to make his debut against Mexico.

== Personal life ==
Pirić married his long-time girlfriend Erina in December 2018.

== Career statistics ==
=== Club ===
As of match played 26 April 2025

Appearances and goals by club, season and competition
Club	Season	League			National cup (Note: Includes Bosnian Cup, Slovenian Cup, Cypriot Cup, Turkish Cup)		Continental		Total	
Club	Season	Division	Apps	Goals	Apps	Goals	Apps	Goals	Apps	Goals
Gradina	2012–13	Bosnian Premier League	16	0	0	0	—		16	0
Sloboda Tuzla	2014–15	Bosnian Premier League	17	0	1	0	—		18	0
Sloboda Tuzla	2015–16	Bosnian Premier League	28	0	7	0	—		35	0
Sloboda Tuzla	2016–17	Bosnian Premier League	15	0	2	0	2 (Note: Appearances in UEFA Europa League)	0	19	0
Sloboda Tuzla	Total		60	0	10	0	2	0	72	0
Zrinjski Mostar	2016–17	Bosnian Premier League	14	0	0	0	—		14	0
Zrinjski Mostar	2017–18	Bosnian Premier League	29	0	0	0	2 (Note: Appearances in UEFA Champions League)	0	31	0
Zrinjski Mostar	Total		43	0	0	0	2	0	45	0
Maribor	2018–19	Slovenian PrvaLiga	20	0	5	0	0	0	25	0
Maribor	2019–20	Slovenian PrvaLiga	26	0	1	0	8 (Note: Six appearances in UEFA Champions League, two appearances in UEFA Europa League)	0	35	0
Maribor	2020–21	Slovenian PrvaLiga	0	0	0	0	0	0	0	0
Maribor	Total		46	0	6	0	8	0	60	0
Atromitos	2021–22	Super League Greece	11	0	0	0	—		11	0
Göztepe	2021–22	Süper Lig	4	0	0	0	—		4	0
AEK Larnaca	2022–23	Cypriot First Division	35	0	0	0	15 (Note: Two appearances in UEFA Champions League, nine appearances in UEFA Europa League, four appearances in UEFA Europa Conference League)	0	50	0
AEK Larnaca	2023–24	Cypriot First Division	36	0	2	0	3 (Note: Appearances in UEFA Europa Conference League)	0	41	0
AEK Larnaca	Total		71	0	2	0	18	0	91	0
Antalyaspor	2024–25	Süper Lig	30	0	1	0	—		31	0
Career total			281	0	19	0	30	0	330	0

=== International ===
Appearances and goals by national team and year
National team	Year	Apps	Goals
Bosnia and Herzegovina
Bosnia and Herzegovina	2018	1	0
Bosnia and Herzegovina	2019	1	0
Bosnia and Herzegovina	2020	2	0
Bosnia and Herzegovina	2021	2	0
Bosnia and Herzegovina	2022	0	0
Bosnia and Herzegovina	2023	1	0
Bosnia and Herzegovina	2024	1	0
Total		8	0

== Honours ==
Zrinjski Mostar

- Bosnian Premier League: 2016–17, 2017–18

Maribor

- Slovenian PrvaLiga: 2018–19
