= Arseni Dmitriyev =

Russian footballer (born 2007)

Personal information
- Full name: Arseni Aleksandrovich Dmitriyev
- Date of birth: 18 July 2007 (age 19)
- Place of birth: Novosibirsk, Russia
- Height: 1.72 m (5 ft 8 in)
- Position: Forward

Team information
- Current team: Akron Tolyatti; Akron-2 Tolyatti
- Number: 69

Youth career
- –2021: Novosibirsk
- 2022–2023: Akron–Konoplyov football academy

Senior career*
Years	Team	Apps	(Gls)
2024–	Akron Tolyatti	19	(1)
2024–	→ Akron-2 Tolyatti	24	(5)

International career^{‡}
2024–2025	Russia U-18	5	(1)
2025	Russia U-19	3	(1)
- * Club domestic league appearances and goals as of 1 November 2026 ‡ National team caps and goals as of 10 October 2025

Arseni Aleksandrovich Dmitriyev (Russian: Арсений Александрович Дмитриев; born 18 July 2007) is a Russian footballer who plays as a forward for Akron Tolyatti and Akron-2 Tolyatti.

== Club career ==
Dmitriyev made his debut in the Russian Premier League for Akron Tolyatti on 20 July 2024 in a game against Lokomotiv Moscow.

== Career statistics ==
As of 1 November 2026

Club	Season	League			Cup		Total	
Club	Season	Division	Apps	Goals	Apps	Goals	Apps	Goals
Akron-2 Tolyatti	2024	Russian Second League B	13	1	—		13	1
Akron-2 Tolyatti	2025	Russian Second League B	7	3	—		7	3
Akron-2 Tolyatti	2026	Russian Second League B	4	1	—		4	1
Akron-2 Tolyatti	Total		24	4	0	0	24	5
Akron Tolyatti	2024–25	Russian Premier League	5	0	4	1	9	1
Akron Tolyatti	2025–26	Russian Premier League	7	0	4	0	11	0
Akron Tolyatti	2026–27	Russian Premier League	7	1	4	1	11	2
Akron Tolyatti	Total		19	1	12	2	31	3
Career total			43	6	12	2	55	8
