= Sergei Gribov (footballer, born 2005) =

Russian footballer

Personal information
- Full name: Sergei Alekseyevich Gribov
- Date of birth: 10 February 2005 (age 21)
- Place of birth: Saint Petersburg, Russia
- Height: 1.88 m (6 ft 2 in)
- Position: Centre-forward

Team information
- Current team: Dynamo Vladivostok
- Number: 91

Youth career
- Krasnodar
- –2022: Zenit St. Petersburg
- 2022–2023: SShOR Zenit St. Petersburg

Senior career*
Years	Team	Apps	(Gls)
2023	Rubin-2 Kazan	16	(2)
2024–2026	Akron Tolyatti	9	(0)
2024–2025	→ Akron-2 Tolyatti	19	(4)
2025–2026	→ Sokol Saratov (loan)	13	(1)
2026	Dynamo Bryansk	18	(4)
2026–	Dynamo Vladivostok	10	(1)
- * Club domestic league appearances and goals as of 15 November 2026

Sergei Alekseyevich Gribov (Russian: Сергей Алексеевич Грибов; born 10 February 2005) is a Russian football player who plays as a centre-forward for Dynamo Vladivostok.

== Career ==
Gribov made his Russian Premier League debut for Akron Tolyatti on 20 July 2024 in a game against Lokomotiv Moscow.

On 5 July 2025, Gribov was loaned by Sokol Saratov.

On 15 February 2026, Gribov moved to Dynamo Bryansk in the Russian Second League.

== Career statistics ==
As of match played 5 April 2025

Appearances and goals by club, season and competition
Club	Season	League			Cup		Europe		Other		Total	
Club	Season	Division	Apps	Goals	Apps	Goals	Apps	Goals	Apps	Goals	Apps	Goals
Rubin-2 Kazan	2023	Russian Second League	16	2	—		—		—		16	2
Akron Tolyatti	2024–25	Russian Premier League	9	0	5	1	—		—		14	1
Akron-2 Tolyatti	2024	Russian Second League	14	3	—		—		—		14	3
Career total			39	5	5	1	0	0	0	0	44	6
