= Rodrigo Escoval =

Portuguese footballer

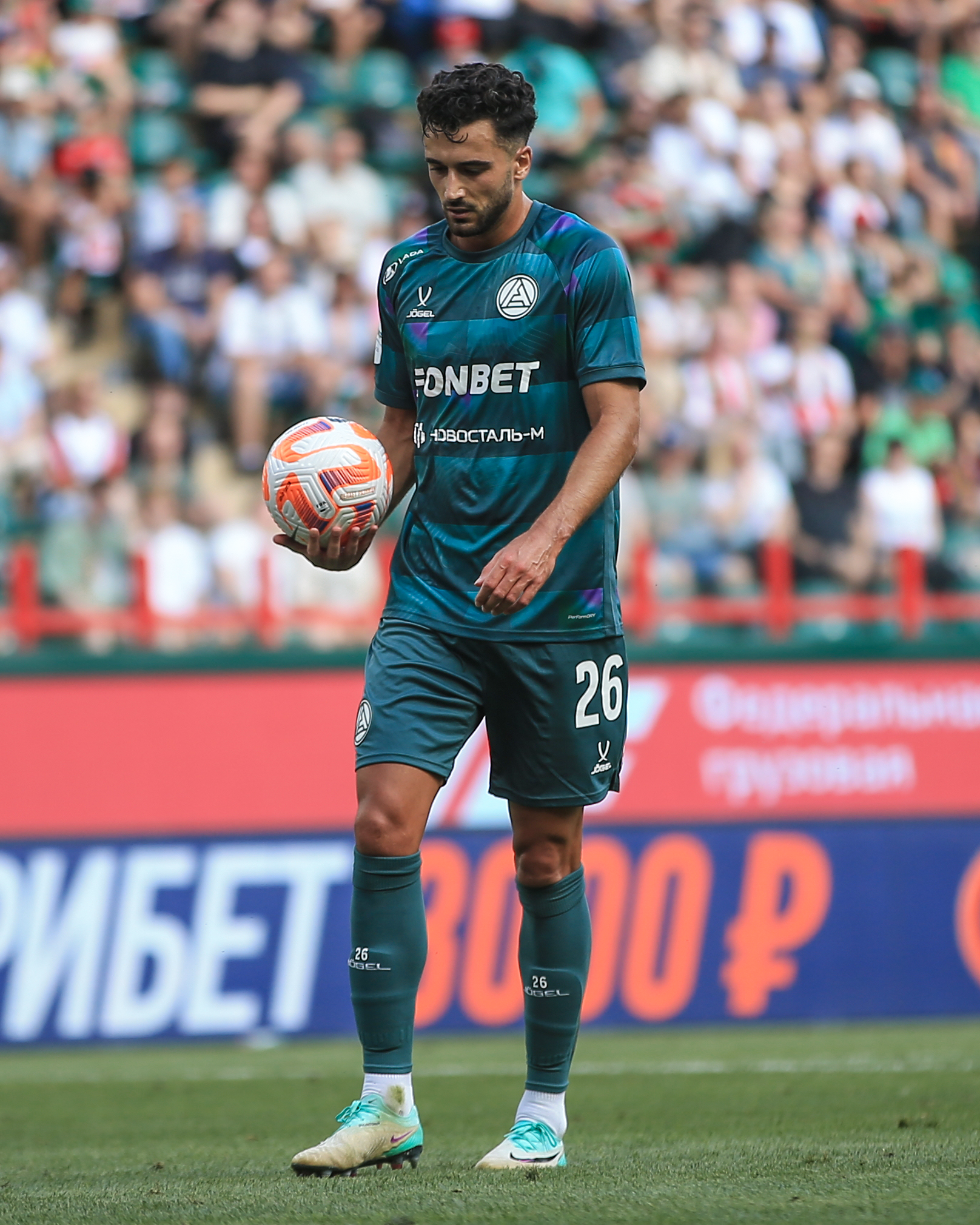

Personal information
- Full name: João Rodrigo Pereira Escoval
- Date of birth: 8 May 1997 (age 29)
- Place of birth: Lisbon, Portugal
- Height: 1.79 m (5 ft 10 in)
- Position: Centre-back

Team information
- Current team: Akron Tolyatti
- Number: 26

Youth career
- 2006–2007: Sacavenense
- 2007–2016: Benfica
- 2014–2015: → Casa Pia (loan)

Senior career*
Years	Team	Apps	(Gls)
2015–2017	Benfica B	16	(0)
2017–2018	Istra 1961	12	(0)
2018–2022	Rijeka	84	(1)
2022	Anorthosis	2	(0)
2022–2023	Volos	29	(0)
2023–2024	Vizela	19	(0)
2024–	Akron Tolyatti	62	(2)
- * Club domestic league appearances and goals as of 21 November 2026

João Rodrigo Pereira Escoval (born 8 May 1997) is a Portuguese professional footballer who plays as a central defender for Russian Premier League club Akron Tolyatti.

== Club career ==
Escoval was born in Lisbon. He joined S.L. Benfica's youth system at the age of 10, signing from SG Sacavenense also in the region.

On 24 August 2016, Escoval made his professional debut for Benfica's B team, playing the full 90 minutes in a 2–1 away win against F.C. Vizela in the LigaPro. He contributed a further nine starts until the end of the season, helping to a final fourth position.

On 18 August 2017, the 20-year-old Escoval and teammate Filipe Ferreira were sold to NK Istra 1961 from the Croatian Football League, as Mato Miloš moved in the opposite direction. On 10 January 2018, he signed a 1 1/2-year contract with HNK Rijeka of the same country and league, with a three-year extension option. He scored his first top-flight goal while in service of the latter club, opening the 2–0 away victory over NK Varaždin on 28 September 2019.

Escoval joined Cypriot First Division side Anorthosis Famagusta FC on 31 January 2022 on a two-and-a-half-year deal, but switched to the Super League Greece with Volos F.C. shortly after. He returned to Portugal in summer 2023, agreeing to a two-year contract at Vizela. He made his Primeira Liga debut on 27 August by starting the 2–0 loss at Vitória de Guimarães and, in December, renewed his link until 2026.

On 29 June 2024, Escoval signed for Russian Premier League newcomers FC Akron Tolyatti.

== Career statistics ==
As of match played 21 November 2026

Appearances and goals by club, season and competition
Club	Season	League			National cup		Europe		Other		Total	
Club	Season	Division	Apps	Goals	Apps	Goals	Apps	Goals	Apps	Goals	Apps	Goals
Benfica B	2015–16	LigaPro	0	0	0	0	0	0	—		0	0
Benfica B	2016–17	LigaPro	16	0	0	0	0	0	—		16	0
Benfica B	Total		16	0	0	0	0	0	0	0	16	0
Istra 1961	2017–18	Croatian Football League	12	0	3	0	0	0	—		15	0
Rijeka	2017–18	Croatian Football League	7	0	0	0	0	0	—		7	0
Rijeka	2018–19	Croatian Football League	23	0	3	0	0	0	—		26	0
Rijeka	2019–20	Croatian Football League	27	1	4	0	0	0	—		31	1
Rijeka	2020–21	Croatian Football League	19	0	1	0	6	1	—		26	1
Rijeka	2021–22	Croatian Football League	8	0	3	0	5	0	—		16	0
Rijeka	Total		84	1	11	0	11	1	0	0	106	2
Anorthosis	2021–22	Cypriot First Division	2	0	3	0	0	0	—		5	0
Volos	2022–23	Super League Greece	29	0	2	0	0	0	—		31	0
Vizela	2023–24	Primeira Liga	19	0	4	0	0	0	—		23	0
Akron Tolyatti	2024–25	Russian Premier League	28	2	2	0	—		—		30	2
Akron Tolyatti	2025–26	Russian Premier League	20	0	5	0	—		2 (Note: Appearances in Russian Premier League relegation play-offs)	0	27	0
Akron Tolyatti	2026–27	Russian Premier League	14	0	3	0	—		—		17	0
Akron Tolyatti	Total		62	2	10	0	0	0	2	0	74	2
Career total			224	3	33	0	11	1	2	0	270	4

== Honours ==
Rijeka

- Croatian Football Cup: 2018–19, 2019–20

Individual

- Russian Premier League Goal of the Month: April 2025 (on 27 April 2025 against Khimki).
