= Marat Bokoyev =

Russian footballer

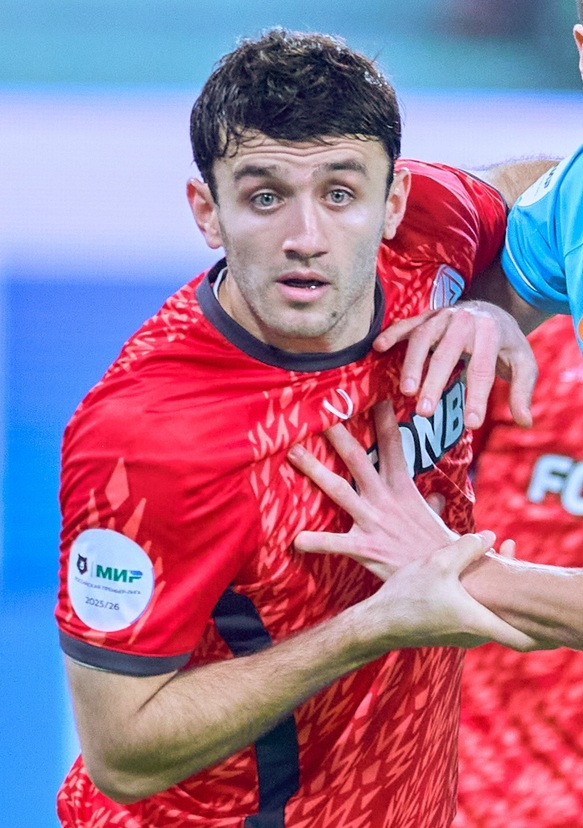
- Bokoyev with Akron Tolyatti in 2025

Personal information
- Full name: Marat Taimurazovich Bokoyev
- Date of birth: 17 July 2001 (age 25)
- Place of birth: Beslan, North Ossetia–Alania, Russia
- Height: 1.91 m (6 ft 3 in)
- Position: Defender

Team information
- Current team: Akron Tolyatti
- Number: 19

Youth career
- 2014–2016: Kanidi SSh Beslan
- 2016–2017: Sport Academy Vladikavkaz

Senior career*
Years	Team	Apps	(Gls)
2018	Avtodor Vladikavkaz (amateur)		
2019	Pishchevik Beslan (amateur)		
2019	Spartak Vladikavkaz	5	(1)
2020	Krasny	14	(1)
2021–2022	Kazanka Moscow	21	(3)
2022–2023	Veles Moscow	27	(0)
2023–	Akron Tolyatti	72	(3)
- * Club domestic league appearances and goals as of 8 November 2026

Marat Taimurazovich Bokoyev (Russian: Марат Таймуразович Бокоев; born 17 July 2001) is a Russian footballer who plays as a defender for Akron Tolyatti.

== Club career ==
Bokoyev made his debut in the Russian Second League for Spartak Vladikavkaz on 24 August 2019 in a game against Kuban Krasnodar.

He made his debut in the Russian First League for Veles Moscow on 17 July 2022 in a game against Baltika Kaliningrad.

Bokoyev made his debut in the Russian Premier League for Akron Tolyatti on 31 August 2024 in a game against Akhmat Grozny.

== Career statistics ==
As of 8 November 2026

Club	Season	League			Cup		Other		Total	
Club	Season	Division	Apps	Goals	Apps	Goals	Apps	Goals	Apps	Goals
Spartak Vladikavkaz	2019–20	Russian Second League	5	1	–		–		5	1
Krasny	2020–21	Russian Second League	14	1	–		–		14	1
Kazanka Moscow	2020–21	Russian Second League	8	1	–		–		8	1
Kazanka Moscow	2021–22	Russian Second League	13	2	–		–		13	2
Kazanka Moscow	Total		21	3	0	0	0	0	21	3
Veles Moscow	2022–23	Russian First League	27	0	–		–		27	0
Akron Tolyatti	2023–24	Russian First League	16	1	3	0	1 (Note: Appearance in promotion play-offs)	0	20	1
Akron Tolyatti	2024–25	Russian Premier League	17	1	8	0	–		25	1
Akron Tolyatti	2025–26	Russian Premier League	27	1	4	0	2 (Note: Appearance in relegation play-offs)	0	33	1
Akron Tolyatti	2026–27	Russian Premier League	12	0	4	0	–		16	0
Akron Tolyatti	Total		72	3	19	0	3	0	94	3
Career total			139	8	19	0	3	0	161	8
