= Maksim Boldyrev =

Russian footballer (born 2004)

Personal information
- Full name: Maksim Dmitriyevich Boldyrev
- Date of birth: 31 March 2004 (age 22)
- Place of birth: Lipetsk, Russia
- Height: 1.89 m (6 ft 2 1/2 in)
- Position: Midfielder

Team information
- Current team: Akron Tolyatti
- Number: 91

Youth career
- 2014–2021: Metallurg Lipetsk

Senior career*
Years	Team	Apps	(Gls)
2022	Orbita Krasnohvardiiske (amateur)		
2022–2023	Metallurg Lipetsk	45	(1)
2024–	Akron Tolyatti	34	(4)
2024–2025	→ Akron-2 Tolyatti	12	(6)
- * Club domestic league appearances and goals as of 21 November 2026

Maksim Dmitriyevich Boldyrev (Russian: Максим Дмитриевич Болдырев; born 31 March 2004) is a Russian footballer who plays as a midfielder for Akron Tolyatti.

== Club career ==
He made his Russian Second League debut for Metallurg Lipetsk on 16 July 2022 in a game against Ryazan.

He made his Russian First League debut for Akron Tolyatti on 16 May 2024 in a game against Shinnik Yaroslavl.

He made his Russian Premier League debut for Akron Tolyatti on 27 April 2025 in a game against Khimki.

On 4 January 2026, Boldyrev extended his contract with Akron to June 2030.

== Career statistics ==
As of 21 November 2026

Club	Season	League			Cup		Other		Total	
Club	Season	Division	Apps	Goals	Apps	Goals	Apps	Goals	Apps	Goals
Metallurg Lipetsk	2022–23	Russian Second League	27	1	–		–		27	1
Metallurg Lipetsk	2023	Russian Second League B	18	0	1	0	–		19	0
Metallurg Lipetsk	Total		45	1	1	0	0	0	46	1
Akron Tolyatti	2023–24	Russian First League	2	0	0	0	1 (Note: Appearance in promotion play-offs)	0	3	0
Akron Tolyatti	2024–25	Russian Premier League	1	0	3	0	–		4	0
Akron Tolyatti	2025–26	Russian Premier League	24	3	4	0	2 (Note: Appearance in relegation play-offs)	0	30	3
Akron Tolyatti	2026–27	Russian Premier League	7	1	2	0	–		9	1
Akron Tolyatti	Total		34	4	9	0	3	0	46	4
Akron-2 Tolyatti	2024	Russian Second League B	9	4	–		–		9	4
Akron-2 Tolyatti	2025	Russian Second League B	3	2	–		–		3	2
Akron-2 Tolyatti	Total		12	6	0	0	0	0	12	6
Career total			91	11	10	0	3	0	104	11
