= Vyacheslav Bardybakhin =

Russian footballer

Personal information
- Full name: Vyacheslav Yevgenyevich Bardybakhin
- Date of birth: 25 May 2002 (age 24)
- Place of birth: Nadym, Russia
- Height: 1.80 m (5 ft 11 in)
- Position: Full-back

Team information
- Current team: Akron Tolyatti
- Number: 13

Youth career
- –2014: DYuSSh Lyubertsy
- 2014–2020: Tyumen

Senior career*
Years	Team	Apps	(Gls)
2020–2023	Tyumen	50	(1)
2022–2023	→ Yenisey Krasnoyarsk (loan)	27	(1)
2022–2023	→ Yenisey-2 Krasnoyarsk (loan)	1	(0)
2023–2024	Yenisey Krasnoyarsk	33	(0)
2024–	Akron Tolyatti	22	(0)
2025–2026	→ Rotor Volgograd (loan)	29	(0)
- * Club domestic league appearances and goals as of 21 November 2026

Vyacheslav Yevgenyevich Bardybakhin (Russian: Вячеслав Евгеньевич Бардыбахин; born 25 May 2002) is a Russian football player who plays as a full-back for Akron Tolyatti.

== Career ==
On 26 June 2024, Bardybakhin signed with the Russian Premier League newcomers Akron Tolyatti.

He made his debut in the RPL for Akron on 27 July 2024 in a game against Fakel Voronezh.

On 3 July 2025, Bardybakhin moved on loan to Rotor Volgograd.

== Career statistics ==
As of match played 21 November 2026

Appearances and goals by club, season and competition
Club	Season	League			Cup		Other		Total	
Club	Season	Division	Apps	Goals	Apps	Goals	Apps	Goals	Apps	Goals
Tyumen	2020–21	Russian Second League	23	0	1	0	—		24	0
Tyumen	2021–22	Russian Second League	27	1	2	0	—		29	1
Tyumen	Total		50	1	3	0	—		53	1
Yenisey Krasnoyarsk (loan)	2022–23	Russian First League	27	1	0	0	1 (Note: Appearances in promotion playoffs)	0	28	1
Yenisey-2 Krasnoyarsk (loan)	2022–23	Russian Second League	1	0	—		—		1	0
Yenisey Krasnoyarsk	2023–24	Russian First League	33	0	1	0	—		34	0
Akron Tolyatti	2024–25	Russian Premier League	8	0	7	0	—		15	0
Akron Tolyatti	2026–27	Russian Premier League	14	0	3	0	—		17	0
Akron Tolyatti	Total		22	0	10	0	—		32	0
Rotor Volgograd (loan)	2025–26	Russian First League	29	0	0	0	2	0	31	0
Career total			162	2	14	0	3	0	179	2
