= Aleksa Đurasović =

Serbian association football player

Personal information
- Date of birth: 23 December 2002 (age 23)
- Place of birth: Subotica, Serbia, FR Yugoslavia
- Height: 1.88 m (6 ft 2 in)
- Position: Midfielder

Team information
- Current team: Akron Tolyatti
- Number: 5

Youth career
- Spartak Subotica

Senior career*
Years	Team	Apps	(Gls)
2020–2024	Spartak Subotica	109	(2)
2024–	Akron Tolyatti	49	(1)

International career^{‡}
2018–2019	Serbia U17	9	(0)
2019	Serbia U18	3	(0)
2021	Serbia U19	3	(0)
2021	Serbia U20	1	(0)
2021–2023	Serbia U21	5	(0)
- * Club domestic league appearances and goals as of 8 August 2026 ‡ National team caps and goals as of 22:09, 24 March 2023 (UTC)

Aleksa Đurasović (Serbian Cyrillic: Алекса Ђурасовић, born 23 December 2002) is a Serbian footballer who plays as a midfielder for Russian club Akron Tolyatti.

== Club career ==
On 1 July 2024, Đurasović signed with Russian Premier League newcomer Akron Tolyatti.

== Career statistics ==
=== Club ===
As of match played 8 August 2026

Appearances and goals by club, season and competition
Club	Season	League			Cup		Other		Total	
Club	Season	Division	Apps	Goals	Apps	Goals	Apps	Goals	Apps	Goals
Spartak Subotica	2019–20	Serbian SuperLiga	2	0	1	0	—		3	0
Spartak Subotica	2020–21	Serbian SuperLiga	22	0	1	0	—		23	0
Spartak Subotica	2021–22	Serbian SuperLiga	22	0	1	0	—		23	0
Spartak Subotica	2022–23	Serbian SuperLiga	30	1	2	0	—		32	1
Spartak Subotica	2023–24	Serbian SuperLiga	33	1	1	0	—		34	1
Spartak Subotica	Total		109	2	6	0	0	0	115	2
Akron Tolyatti	2024–25	Russian Premier League	30	0	3	0	—		33	0
Akron Tolyatti	2025–26	Russian Premier League	16	1	3	0	2 (Note: Appearance in relegation play-offs)	0	21	1
Akron Tolyatti	2026–27	Russian Premier League	3	0	0	0	—		3	0
Akron Tolyatti	Total		49	1	6	0	2	0	57	1
Career total			158	3	12	0	2	0	172	3
