= FC Akron Tolyatti =

Russian football club

Akron Tolyatti
- Full name: Autonomous Non-Commercial Organization Football Club Akron Tolyatti
- Founded: 2018; 8 years ago
- Ground: Kristall Stadium, Zhigulyovsk
- Capacity: 3,065
- Chairman: Aleksey Vlasov
- Manager: Srđan Blagojević
- League: Russian Premier League
- 2025–26: 13th of 16 (relegation play-offs)
- Website: https://fcakron.ru/
| Home colours | Away colours | Third colours |

FC Akron Tolyatti (Russian: ФК «Акрон» Тольятти) is a Russian professional football club based in Tolyatti founded in 2018 who play in the Russian Premier League.

== History ==
In June 2019, it was confirmed that the club will enter the Russian Professional Football League in the 2019–20 season.

On 15 May 2020, the 2019–20 PFL season was abandoned due to COVID-19 pandemic in Russia. As Akron was leading in their PFL zone at the time, they were promoted to the second-tier FNL for the 2020–21 season.

Akron finished their first FNL season in 17th place, which would normally mean relegation. On 15 May 2021, FNL confirmed that FC Tambov, which placed last in the Premier League and was expected to be relegated to FNL, did not apply for the FNL license for the 2021–22 season and therefore Akron would not be relegated.

In June 2022, Akron became the backer of Konoplyov football academy.

In the 2022–23 season, Akron had an impressive run in the Russian Cup. Here, they consecutively eliminated four Moscow-based Russian Premier League clubs (Torpedo, Lokomotiv, Dynamo and Spartak, including two penalty-shoots) and reached the Regions Path final of the competition, where they lost, also in a shootout, to FC Krasnodar. The cup competition structure was changed to double-elimination for RPL teams that season as Russia was banned from the European competitions due to the Russo-Ukrainian War, in the traditional cup structure, eliminating four RPL teams would have been sufficient for Akron to qualify for the final.

In the 2023–24 season, Akron qualified for the Russian Premier League promotion play-offs. They defeated Ural Yekaterinburg 3–2 on aggregate and qualified for RPL for the first time in its history.

Artem Dzyuba played for Akron from 2024 to 2026, he became a record scorer for the Russia national team while representing the club.

In the 2025–26 season, Akron finished the season in the relegation-playoffs spot. They defeated Rotor Volgograd 2–1 on aggregate in the playoffs and remained in the Premier League.

Gilson Benchimol was selected to represent Cape Verde at the 2026 FIFA World Cup. He is the club's first representative at a major international tournament.

== Current squad ==
As of 11 September 2026, according to the Premier League website.

Note: Flags indicate national team as defined under FIFA eligibility rules; some limited exceptions apply. Players may hold more than one non-FIFA nationality.

| No. | Pos. | Nation | Player |
|---|---|---|---|
| 2 | DF | BOL | Yomar Rocha |
| 5 | MF | SRB | Aleksa Đurasović |
| 6 | MF | ARM | Karlen Hovhannisyan |
| 7 | FW | CPV | Benchimol |
| 8 | MF | CRO | Kristijan Bistrović |
| 9 | FW | SRB | Slobodan Tedić |
| 10 | FW | URU | Kevin Arévalo |
| 11 | FW | BRA | Dudu Rodrigues (on loan from Aris) |
| 13 | DF | RUS | Vyacheslav Bardybakhin |
| 14 | MF | RUS | Yuri Zheleznov |
| 15 | MF | MNE | Stefan Lončar |
| 17 | MF | RUS | Artyom Sidorenko |
| 19 | DF | RUS | Marat Bokoyev |
| 21 | DF | BOL | Roberto Fernández |
| 22 | MF | RUS | Konstantin Maradishvili |
| 24 | DF | ROU | Ionuț Nedelcearu |
| 26 | DF | POR | Rodrigo Escoval |
| 32 | GK | RUS | Ignat Terekhovsky |

| No. | Pos. | Nation | Player |
|---|---|---|---|
| 33 | FW | RUS | Maksim Kholodov |
| 39 | FW | RUS | Nazar Makeyev |
| 47 | DF | RUS | Yegor Vedernikov |
| 51 | FW | RUS | Ruslan Metkalov |
| 55 | MF | SRB | Milutin Vidosavljević (on loan from Vojvodina) |
| 67 | MF | RUS | Nikita Platon |
| 69 | FW | RUS | Arseni Dmitriyev |
| 71 | FW | RUS | Dmitry Pestryakov |
| 72 | DF | RUS | Marat Khametov |
| 80 | MF | RUS | Khetag Khosonov |
| 81 | MF | RUS | Nikita Bazilevsky |
| 88 | GK | RUS | Vitali Gudiyev |
| 89 | MF | RUS | Denis Popenkov |
| 90 | FW | RUS | Aleksandr Morozov |
| 91 | MF | RUS | Maksim Boldyrev |
| 98 | GK | RUS | Roman Volochay |
| 99 | FW | BLR | Artyom Shumansky (on loan from CSKA Moscow) |

== See also ==
- FC Academiya
- Konoplyov football academy
