= List of Russian football transfers winter 2025–26 =

This is a list of Russian football transfers in the 2025–26 winter transfer window by club. Only clubs of the 2025–26 Russian Premier League are included.

== Russian Premier League 2025–26 ==
=== Akhmat Grozny ===
In: Note: Flags indicate national team as defined under FIFA eligibility rules; some limited exceptions apply. Players may hold more than one non-FIFA nationality.

| No. | Pos. | Nation | Player |
|---|---|---|---|
| 2 | DF | RUS | Dzhamalutdin Abdulkadyrov (on loan from CSKA Moscow) |
| 5 | DF | ALB | Klisman Cake (from (North Macedonia) Shkëndija) |
| 19 | MF | RUS | Sergei Pryakhin (from Baltika Kaliningrad) |
| 23 | FW | KAZ | Galymzhan Kenzhebek (from (Kazakhstan) Yelimay) |
| 27 | MF | RUS | Akhmed Davlitgereyev (on loan from Nart Cherkessk) |
| 80 | MF | RUS | Valeri Tsarukyan (on loan from Pari Nizhny Novgorod) |
| 82 | DF | RUS | Daniil Khlusevich (on loan from Spartak Moscow) |

Out: Note: Flags indicate national team as defined under FIFA eligibility rules; some limited exceptions apply. Players may hold more than one non-FIFA nationality.

| No. | Pos. | Nation | Player |
|---|---|---|---|
| 5 | DF | BIH | Miloš Šatara (to (Serbia) TSC) |
| 14 | MF | MAR | Amine Talal (to (Kazakhstan) Tobol) |
| 55 | DF | BIH | Darko Todorović (to Fakel Voronezh) |
| 71 | MF | RUS | Magomed Yakuyev (to Ufa) |
| 75 | DF | TUN | Nader Ghandri (to (Libya) Asswehly) |
| 99 | FW | MAR | Anas El Mahraoui (on loan to Orenburg) |
| — | DF | BRA | Lucas Lovat (to (Brazil) CRB, previously on loan to (Brazil) Goiás) |
| — | FW | BRA | Felippe Cardoso (to (Saudi Arabia) Al-Najma, previously on loan to (China) Henan) |

=== Akron Tolyatti ===
In: Note: Flags indicate national team as defined under FIFA eligibility rules; some limited exceptions apply. Players may hold more than one non-FIFA nationality.

| No. | Pos. | Nation | Player |
|---|---|---|---|
| 10 | FW | URU | Kevin Arévalo (from (Uruguay) Montevideo City Torque) |
| — | FW | RUS | Kirill Danilin (end of loan to Torpedo Moscow) |

Out: Note: Flags indicate national team as defined under FIFA eligibility rules; some limited exceptions apply. Players may hold more than one non-FIFA nationality.

| No. | Pos. | Nation | Player |
|---|---|---|---|
| 3 | DF | BLR | Nikita Baranok (to (Belarus) Maxline Vitebsk, previously on loan) |
| 17 | FW | RUS | Soltmurad Bakayev (to Rodina Moscow) |
| 77 | DF | RUS | Konstantin Savichev (to Torpedo Moscow) |
| 86 | DF | RUS | Ilya Agapov (end of loan from CSKA Moscow) |
| 87 | FW | RUS | Nikita Shershov (to Yenisey Krasnoyarsk) |
| — | FW | RUS | Sergei Gribov (to Dynamo Bryansk, previously on loan to Sokol Saratov) |

=== Baltika Kaliningrad ===
In: Note: Flags indicate national team as defined under FIFA eligibility rules; some limited exceptions apply. Players may hold more than one non-FIFA nationality.

| No. | Pos. | Nation | Player |
|---|---|---|---|
| 18 | FW | BRA | Derik Lacerda (on loan from (Brazil) Cuiabá) |
| 21 | DF | PAN | Eduardo Anderson (on loan from (Panama) Alianza) |
| 28 | MF | RUS | Kirill Nikishin (end of loan to Rotor Volgograd) |
| 68 | DF | RUS | Mikhail Ryadno (from CSKA Moscow) |
| 81 | GK | RUS | Ivan Kukushkin (from Pari Nizhny Novgorod, previously on loan) |
| 88 | DF | RUS | Timofey Shchelkunov (end of loan to Shinnik Yaroslavl) |

Out: Note: Flags indicate national team as defined under FIFA eligibility rules; some limited exceptions apply. Players may hold more than one non-FIFA nationality.

| No. | Pos. | Nation | Player |
|---|---|---|---|
| 13 | DF | VEN | Diego Luna (released) |
| 17 | MF | RUS | Vladislav Saus (to Spartak Moscow) |
| 19 | MF | RUS | Sergei Pryakhin (to Akhmat Grozny) |
| 40 | FW | RUS | Dmitry Nikitin (on loan to Sibir Novosibirsk) |
| 47 | MF | RUS | Daniil Utkin (end of loan from Rostov) |
| 96 | MF | RUS | Amir Mokhammad (to (Kazakhstan) Kaisar) |
| — | FW | RUS | Abu-Said Eldarushev (on loan to Rotor Volgograd, previously on loan to (Belarus) Maxline Vitebsk) |
| — | FW | BRA | Alex Fernandes (on loan to (Uzbekistan) Navbahor Namangan, previously on loan to (Azerbaijan) Neftçi) |

=== CSKA Moscow ===
In: Note: Flags indicate national team as defined under FIFA eligibility rules; some limited exceptions apply. Players may hold more than one non-FIFA nationality.

| No. | Pos. | Nation | Player |
|---|---|---|---|
| 2 | DF | BRA | Matheus Reis (from (Portugal) Sporting) |
| 6 | MF | RUS | Dmitri Barinov (from Lokomotiv Moscow) |
| 9 | FW | ARG | Luciano Gondou (from Zenit St. Petersburg) |
| 18 | MF | RUS | Danila Kozlov (from Krasnodar) |
| 97 | FW | RUS | Maksim Voronov (from Ural Yekaterinburg) |

Out: Note: Flags indicate national team as defined under FIFA eligibility rules; some limited exceptions apply. Players may hold more than one non-FIFA nationality.

| No. | Pos. | Nation | Player |
|---|---|---|---|
| 5 | MF | ARG | Rodrigo Villagra (on loan to (Brazil) Internacional) |
| 8 | FW | BLR | Artyom Shumansky (on loan to Krylia Sovetov Samara) |
| 9 | FW | BRA | Alerrandro (on loan to (Brazil) Internacional) |
| 23 | DF | RUS | Dzhamalutdin Abdulkadyrov (on loan to Akhmat Grozny) |
| 30 | FW | RUS | Gleb Popolitov (on loan to Chayka Peschanokopskoye) |
| 68 | DF | RUS | Mikhail Ryadno (to Baltika Kaliningrad) |
| 78 | DF | RUS | Igor Diveyev (to Zenit St. Petersburg) |
| — | DF | RUS | Ilya Agapov (on loan to Ufa, previously on loan to Akron Tolyatti) |
| — | FW | ARG | Adolfo Gaich (to (Argentina) Estudiantes de La Plata, previously on loan to Krylia Sovetov Samara) |

=== Dynamo Makhachkala ===
In: Note: Flags indicate national team as defined under FIFA eligibility rules; some limited exceptions apply. Players may hold more than one non-FIFA nationality.

| No. | Pos. | Nation | Player |
|---|---|---|---|
| 55 | FW | ALG | Diaa Eddine Mechid (from (Algeria) USM Alger) |
| 78 | MF | RUS | Nikita Voronin (from Almaz-Antey St. Petersburg) |

Out: Note: Flags indicate national team as defined under FIFA eligibility rules; some limited exceptions apply. Players may hold more than one non-FIFA nationality.

| No. | Pos. | Nation | Player |
|---|---|---|---|
| 3 | DF | ALG | Imadeddine Azzi (to (Algeria) USM Alger) |
| 53 | MF | RUS | Shamil Gadzhiyev (on loan to (Belarus) Naftan Novopolotsk) |
| — | DF | RUS | Valentin Paltsev (to Krasnodar, previously on loan) |

=== Dynamo Moscow ===
In: Note: Flags indicate national team as defined under FIFA eligibility rules; some limited exceptions apply. Players may hold more than one non-FIFA nationality.

| No. | Pos. | Nation | Player |
|---|---|---|---|
| 57 | DF | BRA | David Ricardo (from (Brazil) Botafogo) |

Out: Note: Flags indicate national team as defined under FIFA eligibility rules; some limited exceptions apply. Players may hold more than one non-FIFA nationality.

| No. | Pos. | Nation | Player |
|---|---|---|---|
| 77 | MF | RUS | Denis Makarov (to (Turkey) Kayserispor) |

=== Krasnodar ===
In: Note: Flags indicate national team as defined under FIFA eligibility rules; some limited exceptions apply. Players may hold more than one non-FIFA nationality.

| No. | Pos. | Nation | Player |
|---|---|---|---|
| 17 | DF | RUS | Valentin Paltsev (from Dynamo Makhachkala, previously on loan) |
| 23 | FW | URU | Juan Manuel Boselli (from Pari Nizhny Novgorod) |

Out: Note: Flags indicate national team as defined under FIFA eligibility rules; some limited exceptions apply. Players may hold more than one non-FIFA nationality.

| No. | Pos. | Nation | Player |
|---|---|---|---|
| 8 | MF | RUS | Danila Kozlov (to CSKA Moscow) |
| 14 | FW | BRA | Gustavo Furtado (on loan to Sochi) |
| 23 | MF | FRA | Gaëtan Perrin (to (France) Lille) |
| 34 | GK | RUS | Daniil Golikov (on loan to Chelyabinsk) |
| 69 | MF | RUS | Artyom Sidorenko (to Pari Nizhny Novgorod) |
| 71 | FW | RUS | Arsen Revazov (to Torpedo Moscow) |
| 97 | FW | RUS | Aleksi Gvenetadze (on loan to Neftekhimik Nizhnekamsk) |
| — | GK | RUS | Valentin Grishin (to Astrakhan, previously on loan) |
| — | DF | RUS | Kirill Larionov (to Rodina-2 Moscow, previously on loan to Volga Ulyanovsk) |
| — | MF | RUS | Ruslan Chobanov (to Chayka Peschanokopskoye, previously on loan to (Belarus) Dinamo Minsk) |

=== Krylia Sovetov Samara ===
In: Note: Flags indicate national team as defined under FIFA eligibility rules; some limited exceptions apply. Players may hold more than one non-FIFA nationality.

| No. | Pos. | Nation | Player |
|---|---|---|---|
| 20 | MF | RUS | Kirill Stolbov (from Zenit St. Petersburg) |
| 31 | DF | ARG | Gonzalo Requena (on loan from (Argentina) Instituto) |
| 70 | FW | BLR | Artyom Shumansky (on loan from CSKA Moscow) |
| 72 | DF | ESP | Dani Fernández (from (Greece) Asteras Tripolis) |
| 99 | FW | NGA | Geoffrey Chinedu (from (Kazakhstan) Astana) |

Out: Note: Flags indicate national team as defined under FIFA eligibility rules; some limited exceptions apply. Players may hold more than one non-FIFA nationality.

| No. | Pos. | Nation | Player |
|---|---|---|---|
| 21 | MF | RUS | Dmytro Ivanisenya (on loan to Ural Yekaterinburg) |
| 29 | FW | BLR | Yegor Karpitsky (on loan to (Belarus) Dnepr Mogilev) |
| 38 | FW | ARG | Adolfo Gaich (end of loan from CSKA Moscow) |

=== Lokomotiv Moscow ===
In: Note: Flags indicate national team as defined under FIFA eligibility rules; some limited exceptions apply. Players may hold more than one non-FIFA nationality.

| No. | Pos. | Nation | Player |
|---|---|---|---|
| 32 | MF | ARG | Lucas Vera (from (United Arab Emirates) Al Wahda) |
| 37 | FW | RUS | Dmitry Radikovsky (end of loan to (Belarus) Vitebsk) |
| 70 | MF | ARM | Vadim Harutyunyan (end of loan to (Belarus) Arsenal Dzerzhinsk) |

Out: Note: Flags indicate national team as defined under FIFA eligibility rules; some limited exceptions apply. Players may hold more than one non-FIFA nationality.

| No. | Pos. | Nation | Player |
|---|---|---|---|
| 6 | MF | RUS | Dmitri Barinov (to CSKA Moscow) |
| — | GK | RUS | Roland Dzhobava (to (Georgia (country)) Rustavi, previously on loan to Spartak Kostroma) |
| — | DF | BLR | Arseniy Ageyev (on loan to (Belarus) Slavia Mozyr, previously on loan to (Belarus) BATE Borisov) |
| — | DF | RUS | Ivan Kuzmichyov (to (Kazakhstan) Okzhetpes, previously on loan to Rodina Moscow) |
| — | DF | UKR | Mark Mampassi (on loan to (Azerbaijan) Turan Tovuz) |
| — | DF | RUS | Kirill Volkov (to Volgar Astrakhan, previously on loan to (Belarus) Arsenal Dzerzhinsk) |
| — | FW | BLR | Aleksandr Frantsuzov (on loan to (Belarus) Torpedo-BelAZ Zhodino, previously on loan to (Belarus) Arsenal Dzerzhinsk) |

=== Orenburg ===
In: Note: Flags indicate national team as defined under FIFA eligibility rules; some limited exceptions apply. Players may hold more than one non-FIFA nationality.

| No. | Pos. | Nation | Player |
|---|---|---|---|
| 6 | DF | COL | Jhon Palacios (from (Colombia) Independiente Medellín) |
| 8 | MF | ARG | Damián Puebla (from (Argentina) Instituto) |
| 27 | MF | RUS | Renat Golybin (from KAMAZ Naberezhnye Chelny) |
| 29 | FW | MAR | Anas El Mahraoui (on loan from Akhmat Grozny) |
| 32 | DF | PAR | Alexis Cantero (on loan from (Paraguay) Olimpia) |
| 59 | MF | ARM | Tigran Avanesyan (on loan from Arsenal Tula) |
| 78 | FW | RUS | Ruslan Kul (from Shinnik Yaroslavl) |
| 88 | GK | RUS | Maksim Rudakov (from Sochi) |

Out: Note: Flags indicate national team as defined under FIFA eligibility rules; some limited exceptions apply. Players may hold more than one non-FIFA nationality.

| No. | Pos. | Nation | Player |
|---|---|---|---|
| 8 | MF | RUS | Vladislav Kamilov (to Ufa) |
| 25 | DF | RUS | Stanislav Oleynik (on loan to Arsenal Tula) |
| 29 | MF | MNE | Vladan Bubanja (on loan to (Croatia) Osijek) |
| 31 | DF | RUS | Georgi Zotov (to Sibir Novosibirsk) |
| 44 | DF | GEO | Anri Chichinadze |
| 53 | GK | RUS | Vyacheslav Korobov (on loan to KAMAZ Naberezhnye Chelny) |
| 69 | DF | RUS | Vladislav Davydov (to KAMAZ Naberezhnye Chelny) |
| 77 | FW | RUS | Atsamaz Revazov (on loan to KAMAZ Naberezhnye Chelny) |
| 79 | FW | RUS | Daniil Antsiperov (on loan to Chernomorets Novorossiysk) |
| 85 | FW | RUS | Ivan Ignatyev (on loan to Arsenal Tula) |
| 88 | DF | RUS | Nikolay Koserik (on loan to Mashuk-KMV Pyatigorsk) |
| — | FW | ECU | Justin Cuero (to (Ecuador) Independiente del Valle, previously on loan to (Ecuador) Emelec) |
| — | FW | BLR | Timofey Martynov (on loan to (Belarus) Dnepr Mogilev, previously on loan to (Belarus) Dynamo Brest) |
| — | FW | RUS | Dmitry Usov (on loan to Tekstilshchik Ivanovo, previously on loan to Dynamo Kirov) |

=== Pari Nizhny Novgorod ===
In: Note: Flags indicate national team as defined under FIFA eligibility rules; some limited exceptions apply. Players may hold more than one non-FIFA nationality.

| No. | Pos. | Nation | Player |
|---|---|---|---|
| 4 | DF | RUS | Ilya Kirsh (on loan from Zenit St. Petersburg) |
| 10 | FW | URU | Adrián Balboa (from (Argentina) Racing Club) |
| 14 | FW | RUS | Matvey Urvantsev (from (Russia) Chelyabinsk) |
| 69 | MF | RUS | Artyom Sidorenko (from Krasnodar) |
| — | FW | RUS | Stanislav Lapinsky (end of loan to Veles Moscow) |

Out: Note: Flags indicate national team as defined under FIFA eligibility rules; some limited exceptions apply. Players may hold more than one non-FIFA nationality.

| No. | Pos. | Nation | Player |
|---|---|---|---|
| 9 | FW | URU | Thiago Vecino (end of loan from (Argentina) Vélez Sarsfield) |
| 11 | FW | GEO | Vakho Bedoshvili (on loan to (Georgia (country)) Iberia 1999) |
| 20 | FW | URU | Juan Manuel Boselli (to Krasnodar) |
| 80 | MF | RUS | Valeri Tsarukyan (on loan to Akhmat Grozny) |
| — | GK | RUS | Ivan Kukushkin (to Baltika Kaliningrad, previously on loan) |
| — | DF | RUS | Kirill Glushchenkov (released, previously on loan to (Belarus) Torpedo-BelAZ Zhodino) |
| — | DF | RUS | Yevgeny Lukinykh (on loan to Kaluga, previously on loan to Zenit-2 St. Petersburg) |
| — | MF | RUS | Yegor Gurenko (on loan to Tyumen, previously from Krasnodar U19) |
| — | MF | RUS | Dmitry Kalayda (to Torpedo Moscow, previously on loan to Amkar Perm) |
| — | MF | RUS | Aleksandr Troshechkin (to Rotor Volgograd, previously on loan to Arsenal Tula) |
| — | FW | GEO | Nikoloz Kutateladze (to (Georgia (country)) Rustavi, previously on loan to (Georgia (country)) Kolkheti-1913 Poti) |
| — | FW | UZB | Ruslanbek Jiyanov (to (Uzbekistan) Navbahor Namangan, previously on loan) |

=== Rostov ===
In: Note: Flags indicate national team as defined under FIFA eligibility rules; some limited exceptions apply. Players may hold more than one non-FIFA nationality.

| No. | Pos. | Nation | Player |

Out: Note: Flags indicate national team as defined under FIFA eligibility rules; some limited exceptions apply. Players may hold more than one non-FIFA nationality.

| No. | Pos. | Nation | Player |
|---|---|---|---|
| 21 | DF | RUS | Nikolai Poyarkov (to Sokol Saratov) |
| 51 | MF | RUS | Aleksey Koltakov (to Torpedo Moscow) |
| 65 | FW | RUS | Nikolay Andriyanov (to Dynamo Stavropol) |
| 88 | FW | TKM | Denis Titow (on loan to Neftekhimik Nizhnekamsk) |
| — | MF | RUS | Daniil Utkin (on loan to Torpedo Moscow, previously on loan to Baltika Kaliningrad) |

=== Rubin Kazan ===
In: Note: Flags indicate national team as defined under FIFA eligibility rules; some limited exceptions apply. Players may hold more than one non-FIFA nationality.

| No. | Pos. | Nation | Player |
|---|---|---|---|
| 1 | GK | RUS | Aleksei Kenyaykin (from Volga Ulyanovsk) |
| 7 | MF | CHI | Ignacio Saavedra (on loan from Sochi) |
| 11 | MF | ALB | Nazmi Gripshi (from (Kazakhstan) Astana) |
| 59 | FW | RUS | Daniil Motorin (end of loan to KAMAZ Naberezhnye Chelny) |

Out: Note: Flags indicate national team as defined under FIFA eligibility rules; some limited exceptions apply. Players may hold more than one non-FIFA nationality.

| No. | Pos. | Nation | Player |
|---|---|---|---|
| 24 | FW | SRB | Nikola Čumić (on loan to (Spain) Zaragoza) |
| — | GK | RUS | Nikita Korets (on loan to Torpedo Moscow, previously on loan to Spartak Kostroma) |
| — | MF | UZB | Umarali Rakhmonaliev (to (Azerbaijan) Sabah, previously on loan) |
| — | FW | ALB | Marvin Çuni (on loan to (Italy) Bari, previously on loan to (Italy) Sampdoria) |

=== Sochi ===
In: Note: Flags indicate national team as defined under FIFA eligibility rules; some limited exceptions apply. Players may hold more than one non-FIFA nationality.

| No. | Pos. | Nation | Player |
|---|---|---|---|
| 23 | FW | BRA | Gustavo Furtado (on loan from Krasnodar) |
| 37 | DF | RUS | Makar Chirkov (end of loan to SKA-Khabarovsk) |

Out: Note: Flags indicate national team as defined under FIFA eligibility rules; some limited exceptions apply. Players may hold more than one non-FIFA nationality.

| No. | Pos. | Nation | Player |
|---|---|---|---|
| 1 | GK | RUS | Maksim Rudakov (to Orenburg) |
| 5 | DF | MAR | Nabil Aberdin (on loan to (United Arab Emirates) Al Jazira) |
| 6 | MF | CHI | Ignacio Saavedra (on loan to Rubin Kazan) |
| 15 | DF | NGA | Solomon Agbalaka |
| 88 | GK | RUS | Ivan Lomayev (to Ufa) |
| — | DF | RUS | Oleg Kozhemyakin (on loan to SKA-Khabarovsk, previously on loan to Torpedo Moscow) |
| — | DF | RUS | Artur Kuskov (to Alania Vlavikavkaz, previously on loan to Nart Cherkessk) |
| — | MF | BLR | Roman Pasevich (on loan to Sokol Saratov, previously on loan to (Slovenia) Mura) |

=== Spartak Moscow ===
In: Note: Flags indicate national team as defined under FIFA eligibility rules; some limited exceptions apply. Players may hold more than one non-FIFA nationality.

| No. | Pos. | Nation | Player |
|---|---|---|---|
| 17 | MF | RUS | Vladislav Saus (from Baltika Kaliningrad) |

Out: Note: Flags indicate national team as defined under FIFA eligibility rules; some limited exceptions apply. Players may hold more than one non-FIFA nationality.

| No. | Pos. | Nation | Player |
|---|---|---|---|
| 82 | DF | RUS | Daniil Khlusevich (on loan to Akhmat Grozny) |
| 88 | DF | RUS | Yegor Guziyev (on loan to Chayka Peschanokopskoye) |
| — | MF | RUS | Maksim Laykin (to KAMAZ Naberezhnye Chelny) |
| — | MF | RUS | Anton Roshchin (to KAMAZ Naberezhnye Chelny, previously on loan to Leningradets Leningrad Oblast) |
| — | MF | RUS | Daniil Plotnikov (to Arsenal Tula, previously on loan to Khimik Dzerzhinsk) |
| — | FW | RUS | Artyom Bykovsky (on loan to Veles Moscow, previously on loan to Tyumen) |

=== Zenit Saint Petersburg ===
In: Note: Flags indicate national team as defined under FIFA eligibility rules; some limited exceptions apply. Players may hold more than one non-FIFA nationality.

| No. | Pos. | Nation | Player |
|---|---|---|---|
| 9 | FW | COL | Jhon Durán (on loan from (Saudi Arabia) Al-Nassr) |
| 14 | MF | BRA | Jhon Jhon (from (Brazil) Red Bull Bragantino) |
| 78 | DF | RUS | Igor Diveyev (from CSKA Moscow) |

Out: Note: Flags indicate national team as defined under FIFA eligibility rules; some limited exceptions apply. Players may hold more than one non-FIFA nationality.

| No. | Pos. | Nation | Player |
|---|---|---|---|
| 9 | MF | BRA | Gerson (to (Brazil) Cruzeiro) |
| 25 | DF | SRB | Strahinja Eraković (on loan to (Serbia) Red Star Belgrade) |
| 30 | FW | COL | Mateo Cassierra (to (Brazil) Atlético Mineiro) |
| 32 | FW | ARG | Luciano Gondou (to CSKA Moscow) |
| 83 | MF | RUS | Kirill Stolbov (to Krylia Sovetov Samara) |
| — | DF | RUS | Ilya Kirsh (on loan to Pari Nizhny Novgorod, previously on loan to Chernomorets Novorossiysk) |
