= Yegor Lyubakov =

Russian footballer (born 1999)

Personal information
- Full name: Yegor Vladimirovich Lyubakov
- Date of birth: 28 June 1999 (age 27)
- Place of birth: Samara, Russia
- Height: 1.96 m (6 ft 5 in)
- Position: Goalkeeper

Team information
- Current team: Baltika Kaliningrad
- Number: 44

Youth career
- –2016: Konoplyov football academy
- 2016–2018: Krylia Sovetov Samara

Senior career*
Years	Team	Apps	(Gls)
2017–2018	Krylia Sovetov-2 Samara	16	(0)
2019–2022	Murom	21	(0)
2022–2024	Tyumen	58	(0)
2024–2025	Baltika-2 Kaliningrad	4	(0)
2024–	Baltika Kaliningrad	4	(0)
- * Club domestic league appearances and goals as of 17 May 2026

Yegor Vladimirovich Lyubakov (Russian: Егор Владимирович Любаков; born 28 June 1999) is a Russian football player who plays as a goalkeeper for Baltika Kaliningrad.

== Career ==
Lyubakov made his debut in the Russian Premier League for Baltika Kaliningrad on 2 May 2026, when he started a game against Rubin Kazan.

== Career statistics ==
As of 29 October 2026

Club	Season	League			Cup		Other		Total	
Club	Season	Division	Apps	Goals	Apps	Goals	Apps	Goals	Apps	Goals
Krylia Sovetov-2 Samara	2017–18	Russian Second League	16	0	—		—		16	0
Murom	2018–19	Russian Second League	0	0	—		2 (Note: Appearances in the FNL Cup)	0	2	0
Murom	2019–20	Russian Second League	0	0	0	0	—		0	0
Murom	2020–21	Russian Second League	18	0	0	0	—		18	0
Murom	2021–22	Russian Second League	3	0	0	0	—		3	0
Murom	Total		21	0	0	0	2	0	23	0
Tyumen	2022–23	Russian Second League	24	0	3	0	—		27	0
Tyumen	2023–24	Russian First League	34	0	0	0	—		34	0
Tyumen	Total		58	0	3	0	0	0	61	0
Baltika-2 Kaliningrad	2024	Russian Second League B	1	0	—		—		1	0
Baltika-2 Kaliningrad	2025	Russian Second League B	3	0	—		—		3	0
Baltika-2 Kaliningrad	Total		4	0	0	0	0	0	4	0
Baltika Kaliningrad	2024–25	Russian First League	1	0	3	0	—		4	0
Baltika Kaliningrad	2025–26	Russian Premier League	3	0	4	0	—		7	0
Baltika Kaliningrad	2026–27	Russian Premier League	0	0	5	0	—		5	0
Baltika Kaliningrad	Total		4	0	12	0	0	0	16	0
Career total			103	0	15	0	2	0	120	0
