= Sergey Varatynov =

Russian footballer (born 2003)

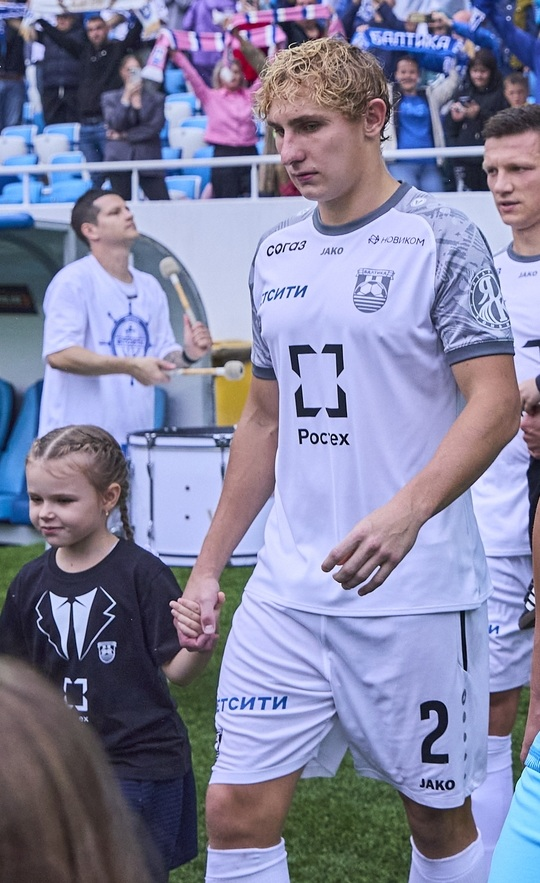
- Varatynov with Baltika in 2025

Personal information
- Full name: Sergey Vladimirovich Varatynov
- Date of birth: 27 June 2003 (age 23)
- Place of birth: Moscow, Russia
- Height: 1.87 m (6 ft 2 in)
- Position: Centre-back

Team information
- Current team: Baltika Kaliningrad
- Number: 2

Youth career
- Torpedo Moscow
- –2022: Lokomotiv Moscow

Senior career*
Years	Team	Apps	(Gls)
2022–2023	Strogino Moscow	39	(1)
2023–2024	Khimki	32	(2)
2024–	Baltika Kaliningrad	66	(4)
2024	→ Baltika-BFU Kaliningrad	1	(0)

International career^{‡}
2018	Russia U15	6	(0)
2018–2019	Russia U16	13	(1)
2019–2020	Russia U17	6	(0)
- * Club domestic league appearances and goals as of 21 November 2026 ‡ National team caps and goals as of 8 February 2020

Sergey Vladimirovich Varatynov (Russian: Сергей Владимирович Варатынов; born 27 June 2003) is a Russian football player who plays as a centre-back for Baltika Kaliningrad.

== Career ==
Varatynov made his Russian Premier League debut for Baltika Kaliningrad on 18 July 2025 in a game against Dynamo Moscow.

== Career statistics ==
As of 21 November 2026

Club	Season	League			Cup		Total	
Club	Season	Division	Apps	Goals	Apps	Goals	Apps	Goals
Strogino Moscow	2021–22	Russian Second League	7	0	0	0	7	0
Strogino Moscow	2022–23	Russian Second League	32	1	2	0	34	1
Strogino Moscow	Total		39	1	2	0	41	1
Khimki	2023–24	Russian First League	32	2	3	0	35	2
Khimki	2024–25	Russian Premier League	0	0	1	0	1	0
Khimki	Total		32	2	4	0	36	2
Baltika Kaliningrad	2024–25	Russian First League	23	2	0	0	23	2
Baltika Kaliningrad	2025–26	Russian Premier League	30	1	4	0	34	1
Baltika Kaliningrad	2026–27	Russian Premier League	13	1	5	0	18	1
Baltika Kaliningrad	Total		66	4	9	0	75	4
Baltika-BFU Kaliningrad	2024	Russian Second League B	1	0	–		1	0
Career total			138	7	15	0	153	7
