= Tigran Avanesyan =

Armenian footballer (born 2002)

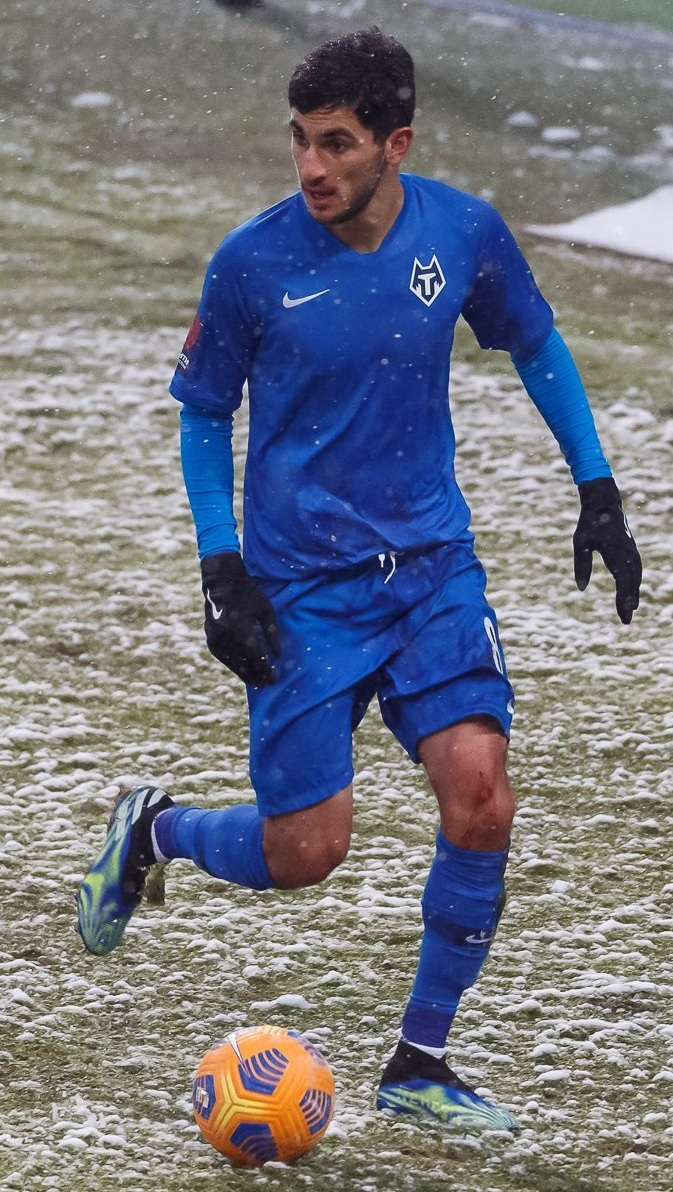
- Avanesyan with Tambov in 2021

Personal information
- Full name: Tigran Benikovich Avanesyan
- Date of birth: 13 April 2002 (age 24)
- Place of birth: Tashkent, Uzbekistan
- Height: 1.75 m (5 ft 9 in)
- Position: Midfielder

Team information
- Current team: Dinamo Samarqand
- Number: 19

Youth career
- –2015: Baltika Kaliningrad
- 2015–2020: CSKA Moscow

Senior career*
Years	Team	Apps	(Gls)
2021–2023	CSKA Moscow	0	(0)
2021	→ Tambov (loan)	3	(0)
2021–2022	→ Tekstilshchik Ivanovo (loan)	22	(1)
2022–2023	→ Baltika Kaliningrad (loan)	6	(0)
2022–2023	→ Baltika-BFU Kaliningrad (loan)	17	(0)
2023–2025	Baltika Kaliningrad	25	(0)
2024–2025	Baltika-BFU Kaliningrad	1	(0)
2025–2026	Arsenal Tula	26	(0)
2026	→ Orenburg (loan)	4	(0)
2026–	Dinamo Samarqand	7	(0)

International career^{‡}
2017–2018	Russia U16	10	(0)
2018–2019	Russia U17	9	(0)
2019	Russia U18	6	(0)
2023–2024	Armenia U21	6	(0)
2024–	Armenia	5	(0)
- * Club domestic league appearances and goals as of 5 September 2026 ‡ National team caps and goals as of 6 June 2026

Tigran Benikovich Avanesyan (Russian: Тигран Беникович Аванесян; Armenian: Տիգրան Ավանեսյան; born 13 April 2002) is a football player who plays as a defensive midfielder for Uzbek club Dinamo Samarqand. Born in Uzbekistan, he plays for the Armenia national team.

== Club career ==
Avanesyan was born in Uzbekistan and moved to Russia at the age of two. Later, he joined the junior teams of CSKA Moscow in 2015, and was first included in their Russian Premier League squad in February 2017, but did not make any appearances for the senior squad in the next 4 years, playing only in the youth team.

On 20 February 2021, he was loaned to Russian Premier League club Tambov until the end of the 2020–21 season.

He made his debut for Tambov on 21 February 2021 in a Russian Cup game against Lokomotiv Moscow. He made his Russian Premier League debut on 26 February 2021 in a game against Rotor Volgograd.

On 1 June 2021, CSKA signed a new contract with Avanesyan that would run throughout the 2025–26 season.

On 7 September 2021, he joined Tekstilshchik Ivanovo on loan.

On 9 June 2022, Avanesyan was loaned to Baltika Kaliningrad, where he already played on junior levels, for the 2022–23 season. On 20 June 2023, Baltika made the transfer permanent.

On 14 January 2025, he left Baltika Kaliningrad and joined Arsenal Tula.

On 6 February 2026, Avanesyan moved on loan to Orenburg, with an option to buy.

On 29 July 2026, Uzbekistan Super League club Dinamo Samarqand announced the signing of Avanesyan on a contract until the end of the season with an option of an additional season.

== International career ==
He represented Russia at the 2019 UEFA European Under-17 Championship and appeared in all 3 games as Russia was eliminated at group stage.

In the summer of 2023, he agreed to play for the Armenian youth team. He made his debut for the U21 national team on September 12 in a home match against Montenegro as part of the 2025 UEFA European Under-21 Championship qualification.

On 25 March 2024, he received his first call-up to the Armenian senior national team for away friendly match against Czech Republic.

On the next day, 26 March 2024, Avanesyan made his debut for the national team.

== Career statistics ==
As of 22 March 2026

Club	Season	League			Cup		Total	
Club	Season	Division	Apps	Goals	Apps	Goals	Apps	Goals
Tambov (loan)	2020–21	Russian Premier League	3	0	1	0	4	0
Tekstilshchik Ivanovo (loan)	2021–22	Russian First League	22	1	–		22	1
Baltika Kaliningrad (loan)	2022–23	Russian First League	6	0	1	0	7	0
Baltika-BFU Kaliningrad (loan)	2022–23	Russian Second League	17	0	–		17	0
Baltika Kaliningrad	2023–24	Russian Premier League	7	0	12	2	19	2
Baltika Kaliningrad	2024–25	Russian First League	13	0	2	0	15	0
Baltika Kaliningrad	Total		20	0	14	2	34	2
Baltika-BFU Kaliningrad	2024	Russian Second League B	1	0	–		1	0
Arsenal Tula	2024–25	Russian First League	11	0	0	0	11	0
Arsenal Tula	2025–26	Russian First League	15	0	3	1	18	1
Arsenal Tula	Total		26	0	3	1	29	1
Orenburg (loan)	2025–26	Russian Premier League	4	0	0	0	4	0
Career total			99	1	19	3	118	4

=== International ===
As of match played 6 June 2026

National Team	Year	Apps	Goals
Armenia
Armenia	2024	1	0
Armenia	2025	2	0
Armenia	2026	2	0
Total		5	0

== Honours ==
FC Baltika Kaliningrad

- Russian Cup runner-up: 2023–24
