= Nikita Bozov =

Russian footballer (born 2005)

Personal information
- Full name: Nikita Vasilyevich Bozov
- Date of birth: 28 January 2005 (age 21)
- Place of birth: Moscow, Russia
- Height: 1.86 m (6 ft 1 in)
- Position: Centre-back

Team information
- Current team: Torpedo Moscow (on loan from Baltika Kaliningrad)
- Number: 2

Youth career
- Spartak Moscow

Senior career*
Years	Team	Apps	(Gls)
2023–2024	Spartak Moscow	1	(0)
2024	Spartak-2 Moscow	13	(0)
2024–	Baltika Kaliningrad	0	(0)
2024–	→ Baltika-2 Kaliningrad	16	(3)
2025–2026	→ Shinnik Yaroslavl (loan)	21	(1)
2026–	→ Torpedo Moscow (loan)	0	(0)

International career^{‡}
2020	Russia U15	1	(0)
2021–2022	Russia U17	6	(0)
2022	Russia U18	4	(0)
2023	Russia U19	1	(0)
2023–2024	Russia U21	3	(0)
- * Club domestic league appearances and goals as of 16 May 2026 ‡ National team caps and goals as of 6 September 2024

Nikita Vasilyevich Bozov (Russian: Никита Васильевич Бозов; born 28 January 2005) is a Russian football player who plays as a centre-back for Torpedo Moscow on loan from Baltika Kaliningrad.

== Career ==
Bozov made his debut in the Russian Premier League for Spartak Moscow on 25 May 2024 in a game against Orenburg.

On 20 July 2024, Bozov signed a five-year contract with Baltika Kaliningrad.

On 20 June 2025, Bozov moved on loan to Shinnik Yaroslavl for the 2025–26 season. On 19 June 2026, Bozov joined Torpedo Moscow on loan for the 2026–27 season.

== Career statistics ==
As of 25 May 2025

Club	Season	League			Cup		Continental		Other		Total	
Club	Season	Division	Apps	Goals	Apps	Goals	Apps	Goals	Apps	Goals	Apps	Goals
Spartak-2 Moscow	2024	Russian Second League B	7	0	–		–		–		7	0
Spartak Moscow	2023–24	Russian Premier League	1	0	0	0	–		–		1	0
Baltika Kaliningrad	2024–25	Russian First League	0	0	2	0	–		–		2	0
Baltika-2 Kaliningrad	2024	Russian Second League B	9	2	–		–		–		9	2
Baltika-2 Kaliningrad	2025	Russian Second League B	7	1	–		–		–		7	1
Baltika-2 Kaliningrad	Total		16	3	0	0	0	0	0	0	16	3
Career total			24	3	2	0	0	0	0	0	26	3
