= Vladislav Saus =

Russian footballer

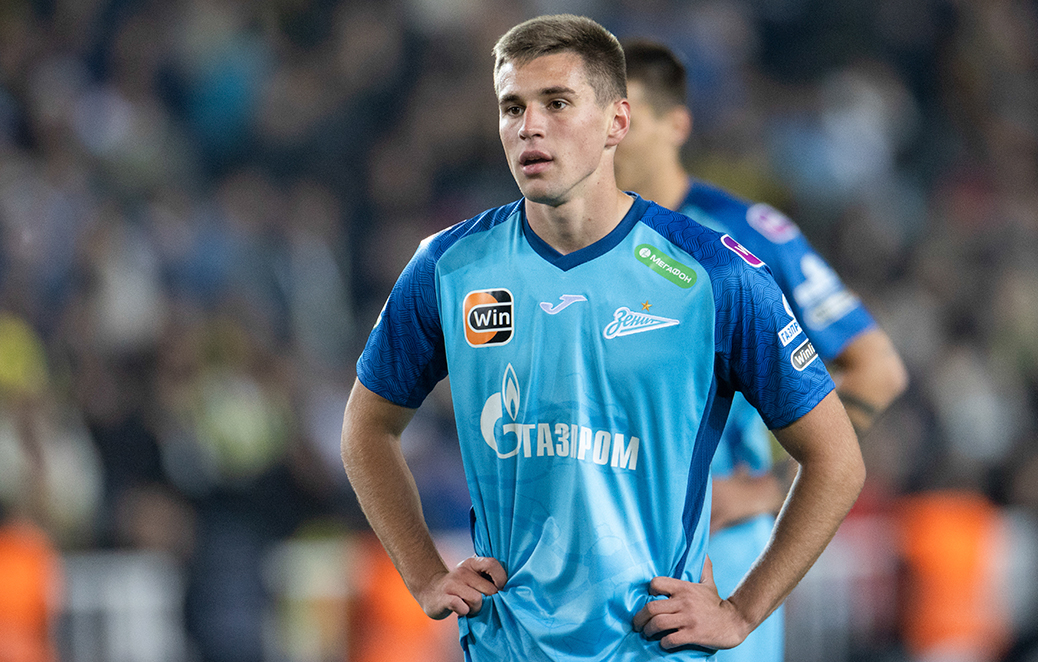
- FC Zenit, 2024

Personal information
- Full name: Vladislav Vladimirovich Saus
- Date of birth: 6 August 2003 (age 23)
- Place of birth: Pavlovskaya, Russia
- Height: 1.75 m (5 ft 9 in)
- Position: Right midfielder

Team information
- Current team: Spartak Moscow
- Number: 17

Youth career
- –2021: UOR #5 Yegoryevsk
- 2021–2022: Zenit St. Petersburg

Senior career*
| Years | Team | Apps | (Gls) |
| 2021–2023 | Zenit-2 St. Petersburg | 46 | (6) |
| 2023–2024 | Zenit St. Petersburg | 1 | (0) |
| 2024 | → Shinnik Yaroslavl (loan) | 14 | (0) |
| 2024–2026 | Baltika Kaliningrad | 48 | (1) |
| 2026– | Spartak Moscow | 4 | (0) |
- * Club domestic league appearances and goals as of 16 August 2026

Vladislav Vladimirovich Saus (Russian: Владислав Владимирович Саусь; born 6 August 2003) is a Russian football player who plays for Spartak Moscow. His primary position is right midfielder and he also plays in other midfield positions or as a winger.

== Career ==
He made his debut in the Russian Premier League for Zenit St. Petersburg on 3 June 2023 in a game against Fakel Voronezh.

On 23 January 2024, Saus was loaned to Shinnik Yaroslavl, with an option to buy.

On 22 June 2024, Saus signed a contract with Baltika Kaliningrad until 31 May 2029.

On 26 January 2026, Saus joined Spartak Moscow on a four-and-a-half-year contract.

== Career statistics ==
As of match played 28 October 2026

Appearances and goals by club, season and competition
| Club | Season | League | | | Cup | | Total | |
| Club | Season | Division | Apps | Goals | Apps | Goals | Apps | Goals |
|---|---|---|---|---|---|---|---|---|
| Zenit-2 Saint Petersburg | 2021–22 | Russian Second League | 2 | 0 | – | | 2 | 0 |
| Zenit-2 Saint Petersburg | 2022–23 | Russian Second League | 27 | 2 | – | | 27 | 2 |
| Zenit-2 Saint Petersburg | 2023 | Russian Second League B | 17 | 4 | – | | 17 | 4 |
| Zenit-2 Saint Petersburg | Total | | 46 | 6 | – | | 46 | 6 |
| Zenit Saint Petersburg | 2022–23 | Russian Premier League | 1 | 0 | 0 | 0 | 1 | 0 |
| Zenit Saint Petersburg | 2023–24 | Russian Premier League | 0 | 0 | 0 | 0 | 0 | 0 |
| Zenit Saint Petersburg | Total | | 1 | 0 | 0 | 0 | 1 | 0 |
| Shinnik Yaroslavl (loan) | 2023–24 | Russian First League | 14 | 0 | 0 | 0 | 14 | 0 |
| Baltika Kaliningrad | 2024–25 | Russian First League | 31 | 0 | 1 | 0 | 32 | 0 |
| Baltika Kaliningrad | 2025–26 | Russian Premier League | 17 | 1 | 3 | 0 | 20 | 1 |
| Baltika Kaliningrad | Total | | 48 | 1 | 4 | 0 | 52 | 1 |
| Spartak Moscow | 2025–26 | Russian Premier League | 3 | 0 | 2 | 0 | 5 | 0 |
| Spartak Moscow | 2026–27 | Russian Premier League | 1 | 0 | 5 | 0 | 6 | 0 |
| Spartak Moscow | Total | | 4 | 0 | 7 | 0 | 11 | 0 |
| Career total | | | 113 | 7 | 11 | 0 | 124 | 7 |

== Honours ==
=== Club ===
Zenit Saint Petersburg

- Russian Premier League: 2022–23

Spartak Moscow

- Russian Cup: 2025–26

=== Individual ===
- Russian Premier League Goal of the Month: July/August 2025 (against Spartak Moscow on 26 July 2025)
