= Kirill Nikishin =

Russian footballer (born 2004)

Personal information
- Full name: Kirill Alekseyevich Nikishin
- Date of birth: 5 February 2004 (age 22)
- Height: 1.78 m (5 ft 10 in)
- Position: Forward

Team information
- Current team: Neftekhimik Nizhnekamsk (on loan from Baltika Kaliningrad)
- Number: 17

Youth career
- Lokomotiv Moscow

Senior career*
Years	Team	Apps	(Gls)
2022–2024	Lokomotiv Moscow	0	(0)
2024	Tyumen	4	(0)
2024–	Baltika Kaliningrad	14	(3)
2024–	→ Baltika-2 Kaliningrad	7	(0)
2025	→ Rotor Volgograd (loan)	10	(0)
2026	→ Baltika-2 Kaliningrad	18	(8)
2026–	→ Neftekhimik Nizhnekamsk (loan)	0	(0)

International career^{‡}
2021	Russia U17	2	(1)
2023	Russia U19	3	(5)
2024–2025	Russia U21	4	(1)
- * Club domestic league appearances and goals as of 23 August 2026 ‡ National team caps and goals as of 23 March 2025

Kirill Alekseyevich Nikishin (Russian: Кирилл Алексеевич Никишин; born 5 February 2004) is a Russian footballer who plays as a forward for Neftekhimik Nizhnekamsk on loan from Baltika Kaliningrad.

== Club career ==
Nikishin made his debut for Lokomotiv Moscow on 23 November 2022 in a Russian Cup game against FC Krasnodar.

On 27 July 2023, Nikishin extended his contract with Lokomotiv to June 2026.

On 2 February 2024, Nikishin moved to Tyumen in the Russian First League.

On 26 June 2025, Nikishin joined Rotor Volgograd on loan for the 2025–26 season.

== Career statistics ==
=== Club ===
As of 23 August 2026

Appearances and goals by club, season and competition
Club	Season	League			Cup		Total	
Club	Season	Division	Apps	Goals	Apps	Goals	Apps	Goals
Lokomotiv Moscow	2022–23	Russian Premier League	0	0	2	0	2	0
Lokomotiv Moscow	2023–24	Russian Premier League	0	0	0	0	0	0
Lokomotiv Moscow	Total		0	0	2	0	2	0
Tyumen	2023–24	Russian First League	4	0	0	0	4	0
Baltika Kaliningrad	2024–25	Russian First League	14	3	2	0	16	3
Baltika-2 Kaliningrad	2024	Russian Second League B	2	0	–		2	0
Baltika-2 Kaliningrad	2025	Russian Second League B	5	0	–		5	0
Baltika-2 Kaliningrad	2026	Russian Second League B	18	8	–		18	8
Baltika-2 Kaliningrad	Total		25	8	0	0	25	8
Rotor Volgograd (loan)	2025–26	Russian First League	10	0	1	0	11	0
Career total			53	11	5	0	58	11
