= Sergei Pryakhin =

Sergei Pryakhin may refer to:

- Sergei Pryakhin (ice hockey)
- Sergei Pryakhin (footballer)
