= Nikolai Titkov =

Russian footballer

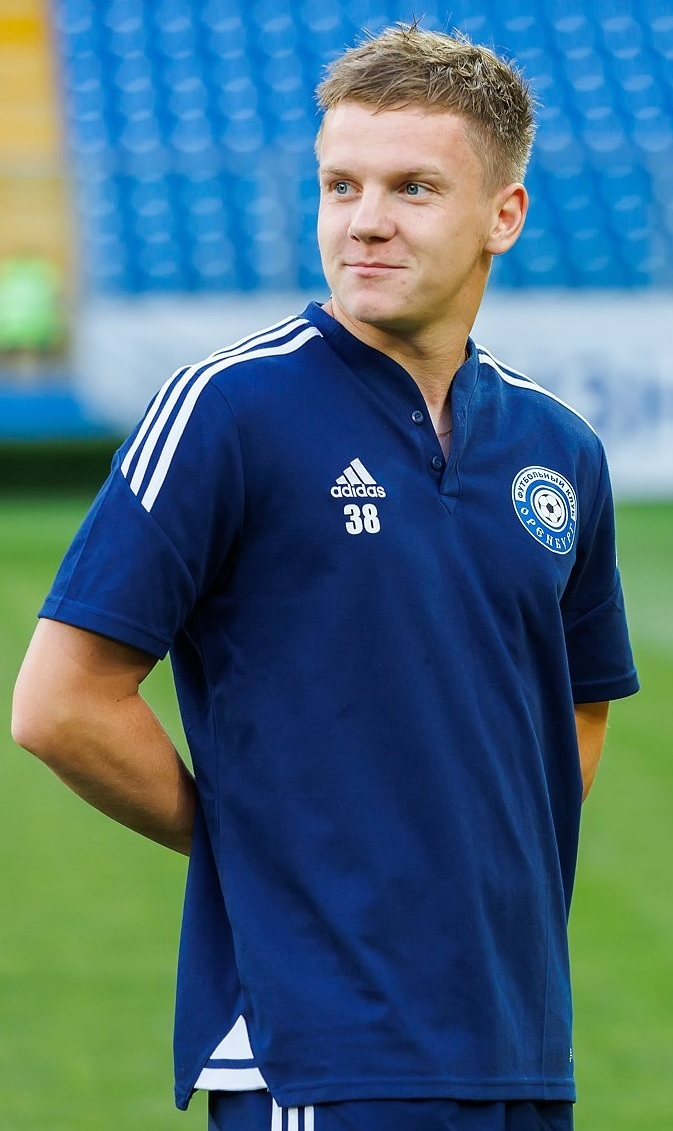
- Titkov with Orenburg in 2022

Personal information
- Full name: Nikolai Dmitriyevich Titkov
- Date of birth: 18 August 2000 (age 26)
- Place of birth: Ryazan, Russia
- Height: 1.77 m (5 ft 10 in)
- Position: Midfielder

Team information
- Current team: Lokomotiv Moscow
- Number: 18

Youth career
- 2017–2018: UOR #5 Yegoryevsk
- 2018–2019: Lokomotiv Moscow

Senior career*
Years	Team	Apps	(Gls)
2019–2021	Kazanka Moscow	31	(12)
2019–2025	Lokomotiv Moscow	4	(0)
2021–2024	→ Orenburg (loan)	52	(3)
2024–2025	→ Baltika Kaliningrad (loan)	19	(5)
2025–2026	Baltika Kaliningrad	35	(3)
2026–	Lokomotiv Moscow	8	(2)
- * Club domestic league appearances and goals as of 22 November 2026

Nikolai Dmitriyevich Titkov (Russian: Никола́й Дми́триевич Титко́в; born 18 August 2000) is a Russian football player who plays as a central midfielder for Lokomotiv Moscow.

== Club career ==
Titkov made his debut in the Russian Professional Football League for Kazanka Moscow on 17 July 2019 in a game against Kolomna.

He made his debut for the senior squad of Lokomotiv Moscow on 25 September 2019 in a Russian Cup game against Baltika Kaliningrad.

He made his Russian Premier League debut for Lokomotiv on 5 December 2020 in a game against Rubin Kazan, he substituted Vitaly Lisakovich in the 90th minute of the game.

On 19 June 2021, Titkov joined Orenburg on loan. On 16 June 2022, Titkov returned to Orenburg, again on loan. On 22 June 2023, the loan was extended for another season, with an option to buy.

On 19 June 2024, Titkov moved on a new loan to Baltika Kaliningrad. On 11 July 2025, Titkov returned to Baltika on a permanent basis and signed a three-year contract with the club.

On 10 September 2026, Titkov returned to Lokomotiv Moscow with a contract until June 2029.

== Career statistics ==
As of 22 November 2026

Club	Season	League			Cup		Continental		Other		Total	
Club	Season	Division	Apps	Goals	Apps	Goals	Apps	Goals	Apps	Goals	Apps	Goals
Kazanka Moscow	2019–20	Russian Second League	14	4	–		–		–		14	4
Kazanka Moscow	2020–21	Russian Second League	17	8	–		–		–		17	8
Kazanka Moscow	Total		31	12	0	0	0	0	0	0	31	12
Lokomotiv Moscow	2019–20	Russian Premier League	0	0	1	0	0	0	–		1	0
Lokomotiv Moscow	2020–21	Russian Premier League	4	0	0	0	0	0	–		4	0
Lokomotiv Moscow	Total		4	0	1	0	0	0	0	0	5	0
Orenburg (loan)	2021–22	Russian First League	35	3	2	0	–		2 (Note: Appearances in the promotion play-offs)	0	39	3
Orenburg (loan)	2022–23	Russian Premier League	16	0	3	0	–		–		19	0
Orenburg (loan)	2023–24	Russian Premier League	1	0	7	1	–		–		8	1
Orenburg (loan)	Total		52	3	12	1	0	0	2	0	66	4
Baltika Kaliningrad (loan)	2024–25	Russian First League	19	5	3	0	–		–		22	5
Baltika Kaliningrad	2025–26	Russian Premier League	28	2	2	0	–		–		30	2
Baltika Kaliningrad	2026–27	Russian Premier League	7	1	0	0	–		–		7	1
Baltika Kaliningrad	Total		35	3	2	0	0	0	0	0	37	3
Baltika Kaliningrad	Club total		54	8	5	0	0	0	0	0	59	8
Lokomotiv Moscow	2026–27	Russian Premier League	8	2	2	0	–		–		10	2
Lokomotiv Moscow	Club total		12	2	3	0	0	0	0	0	15	2
Career total			149	25	20	1	0	0	2	0	171	26
