= Maksim Petrov (footballer) =

Russian footballer

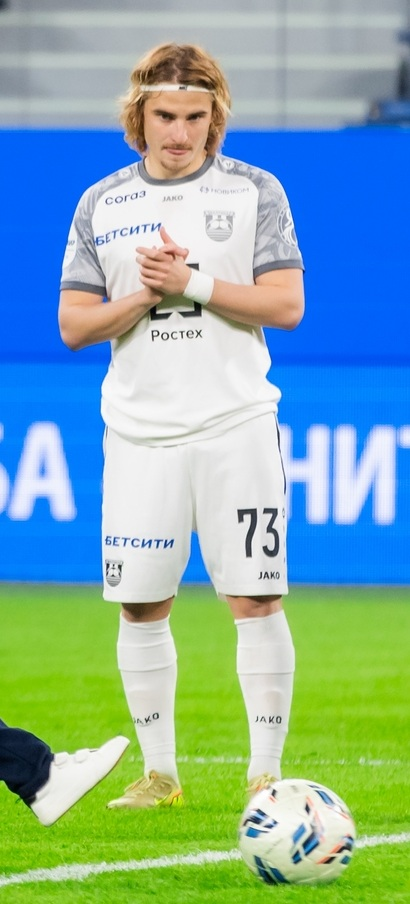
- Petrov with Baltika Kaliningrad in 2026

Personal information
- Full name: Maksim Vyacheslavovich Petrov
- Date of birth: 18 January 2001 (age 25)
- Place of birth: Balashikha, Moscow, Russia
- Height: 1.65 m (5 ft 5 in)
- Position: Midfielder

Team information
- Current team: Baltika Kaliningrad
- Number: 73

Youth career
- –2019: Lokomotiv Moscow

Senior career*
Years	Team	Apps	(Gls)
2019–2022	Kazanka Moscow	23	(3)
2021–2023	Lokomotiv Moscow	15	(0)
2022–2023	→ Alania Vladikavkaz (loan)	21	(3)
2023–2025	Neftekhimik Nizhnekamsk	53	(8)
2025–	Baltika Kaliningrad	53	(9)

International career^{‡}
2016	Russia U15	5	(0)
2017	Russia U16	6	(2)
2017–2018	Russia U17	12	(5)
2018–2019	Russia U18	18	(3)
2019–2020	Russia U19	8	(2)
2026–	Russia	4	(1)
- * Club domestic league appearances and goals as of 21 November 2026 ‡ National team caps and goals as of 3 October 2026

Maksim Vyacheslavovich Petrov (Russian: Максим Вячеславович Петров; born 18 January 2001) is a Russian footballer playing as a midfielder for Baltika Kaliningrad and the Russia national team. He is mostly used as a winger, after playing most of his junior career in a central midfielder position.

== Club career ==
He made his Russian Premier League debut for Lokomotiv Moscow on 11 September 2021 in a game against Krylia Sovetov Samara. He made his European debut on 30 September 2021 in an Europa League game against Lazio.

On 29 August 2022, Petrov was loaned to Alania Vladikavkaz.

On 27 June 2023, Petrov moved to Neftekhimik Nizhnekamsk.

On 26 January 2026, Petrov extended his contract with Baltika Kaliningrad until June 2030.

== International career ==
Petrov was first called up to Russia national team in March 2026 for friendlies against Nicaragua and Mali. He made his debut on 27 March 2026 against Nicaragua.

== Career statistics ==
=== Club ===
As of 21 November 2026.

Club	Season	League			Cup		Continental		Total	
Club	Season	Division	Apps	Goals	Apps	Goals	Apps	Goals	Apps	Goals
Kazanka Moscow	2019–20	Russian Second League	8	0	–		–		8	0
Kazanka Moscow	2020–21	Russian Second League	11	2	–		–		11	2
Kazanka Moscow	2021–22	Russian Second League	4	1	–		–		4	1
Kazanka Moscow	Total		23	3	0	0	0	0	23	3
Lokomotiv Moscow	2021–22	Russian Premier League	14	0	1	0	2 (Note: Appearances in the UEFA Europa League)	0	17	0
Lokomotiv Moscow	2022–23	Russian Premier League	1	0	–		–		1	0
Lokomotiv Moscow	Total		15	0	1	0	2	0	18	0
Alania Vladikavkaz (loan)	2022–23	Russian First League	21	3	0	0	–		21	3
Neftekhimik Nizhnekamsk	2023–24	Russian First League	33	5	1	0	–		34	5
Neftekhimik Nizhnekamsk	2024–25	Russian First League	20	3	1	0	–		21	3
Neftekhimik Nizhnekamsk	Total		53	8	2	0	0	0	55	8
Baltika Kaliningrad	2024–25	Russian First League	12	1	0	0	–		12	1
Baltika Kaliningrad	2025–26	Russian Premier League	26	7	3	0	–		29	7
Baltika Kaliningrad	2026–27	Russian Premier League	15	1	2	0	–		17	1
Baltika Kaliningrad	Total		53	9	5	0	0	0	58	9
Career total			165	23	8	0	2	0	175	23

=== International ===
As of match played 3 October 2026

Appearances and goals by national team and year
National team	Year	Apps	Goals
Russia	2026	4	1
Total		4	1

==== International goals ====
Scores and results list Russia's goal tally first.

No.	Date	Venue	Opponent	Score	Result	Competition
1	3 October 2026	Yekaterinburg Arena, Yekaterinburg, Russia	Namibia	5–0	6–0	Friendly
