= Ilya Porokhov =

Russian footballer (born 2001)

Personal information
- Full name: Ilya Sergeyevich Porokhov
- Date of birth: 11 June 2001 (age 25)
- Place of birth: Kazan, Russia
- Height: 1.78 m (5 ft 10 in)
- Position: Centre-forward

Team information
- Current team: Baltika Kaliningrad
- Number: 11

Youth career
- –2019: Rubin Kazan
- 2019–2021: Smena Kazan

Senior career*
Years	Team	Apps	(Gls)
2021–2022	Zvezda Perm	36	(12)
2022–2024	Tyumen	53	(18)
2024–2025	Khimki	0	(0)
2024–2025	→ Ural Yekaterinburg (loan)	8	(0)
2025	→ Sokol Saratov (loan)	13	(0)
2025–2026	Shinnik Yaroslavl	34	(7)
2026–	Baltika Kaliningrad	3	(0)
- * Club domestic league appearances and goals as of 21 November 2026

Ilya Sergeyevich Porokhov (Russian: Илья Сергеевич Порохов; born 11 June 2001) is a Russian football player who plays as a centre-forward for Baltika Kaliningrad.

== Career ==
Porokhov spent most of his junior career with Rubin Kazan and made his senior debut in the third-tier Russian Second League for Zvezda Perm in 2021.

On 10 September 2026, Porokhov signed a three-season contract with Russian Premier League club Baltika Kaliningrad.

He made his RPL debut for Baltika on 24 October 2026 in a game against Krasnodar.

== Career statistics ==
As of 21 November 2026

Club	Season	League			Cup		Total	
Club	Season	Division	Apps	Goals	Apps	Goals	Apps	Goals
Zvezda Perm	2020–21	Russian Second League	12	1	—		12	1
Zvezda Perm	2021–22	Russian Second League	24	11	0	0	24	11
Zvezda Perm	Total		36	12	0	0	36	12
Tyumen	2022–23	Russian Second League	24	9	3	1	27	10
Tyumen	2023–24	Russian First League	29	9	1	0	30	9
Tyumen	Total		53	18	4	1	57	19
Ural Yekaterinburg (loan)	2024–25	Russian First League	8	0	3	1	11	1
Sokol Saratov (loan)	2024–25	Russian First League	13	0	—		13	0
Shinnik Yaroslavl	2025–26	Russian First League	25	4	1	1	26	5
Shinnik Yaroslavl	2026–27	Russian First League	9	3	—		9	3
Shinnik Yaroslavl	Total		34	7	1	1	35	8
Baltika Kaliningrad	2026–27	Russian Premier League	3	0	1	1	4	1
Career total			147	37	9	4	156	41
