= Sergei Pryakhin (footballer) =

Russian footballer (born 2002)

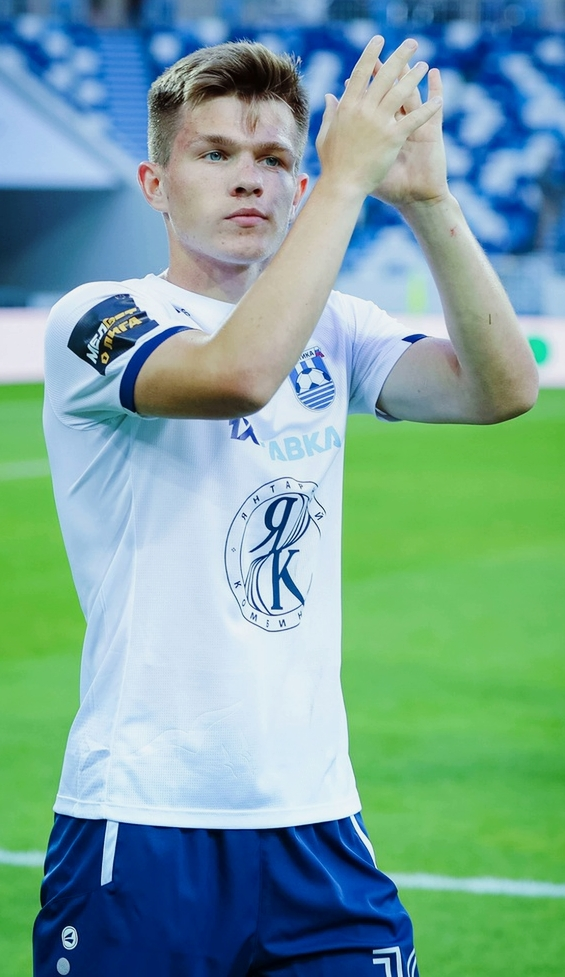
- Pryakhin with Baltika Kaliningrad in 2022

Personal information
- Full name: Sergei Aleksandrovich Pryakhin
- Date of birth: 16 December 2002 (age 23)
- Place of birth: Balakovo, Saratov Oblast, Russia
- Height: 1.75 m (5 ft 9 in)
- Position: Attacking midfielder

Team information
- Current team: Akhmat Grozny
- Number: 19

Youth career
- –2018: DYuSSh Balakovo
- 2018–2021: PFC CSKA Moscow

Senior career*
Years	Team	Apps	(Gls)
2021–2023	CSKA Moscow	0	(0)
2021–2022	→ Kairat Moscow (loan)	28	(2)
2022–2023	→ Baltika Kaliningrad (loan)	28	(4)
2022	→ Baltika-BFU (loan)	1	(0)
2023–2026	Baltika Kaliningrad	62	(8)
2024	→ Baltika-BFU	1	(2)
2026–	Akhmat Grozny	12	(0)
- * Club domestic league appearances and goals as of 17 September 2026

Sergei Aleksandrovich Pryakhin (Russian: Сергей Александрович Пряхин; born 16 December 2002) is a Russian footballer who plays as an attacking midfielder or winger for Akhmat Grozny.

== Club career ==
Pryakhin made his Russian Football National League 2 debut for Kairat Moscow on 18 July 2021 in a game against Leningradets Leningrad Oblast.

He made his debut in the Russian First League for Baltika Kaliningrad on 24 July 2022 in a game against Volgar Astrakhan.

Pryakhin made his debut in the Russian Premier League for Baltika Kaliningrad on 24 July 2023 in a game against Sochi.

On 10 January 2026, Pryakhin signed a three-and-a-half-year contract with Akhmat Grozny.

== Career statistics ==
As of match played 17 September 2026

Appearances and goals by club, season and competition
Club	Season	League			Russian Cup		Total	
Club	Season	Division	Apps	Goals	Apps	Goals	Apps	Goals
Kairat Moscow (loan)	2021–22	Russian Second League	28	2	5	0	33	2
Baltika Kaliningrad (loan)	2022–23	Russian First League	28	4	1	0	29	4
Baltika-BFU Kaliningrad (loan)	2022–23	Russian Second League	1	0	–		1	0
Baltika Kaliningrad	2023–24	Russian Premier League	18	1	6	0	24	1
Baltika Kaliningrad	2024–25	Russian First League	31	6	0	0	31	6
Baltika Kaliningrad	2025–26	Russian Premier League	13	1	5	0	18	1
Baltika Kaliningrad	Total		62	8	11	0	73	8
Baltika-BFU Kaliningrad	2024	Russian Second League B	1	2	–		1	2
Akhmat Grozny	2025–26	Russian Premier League	9	0	–		9	0
Akhmat Grozny	2026–27	Russian Premier League	3	0	1	0	4	0
Akhmat Grozny	Total		12	0	1	0	13	0
Career total			132	16	18	0	150	16
