= Abu-Said Eldarushev =

Russian footballer

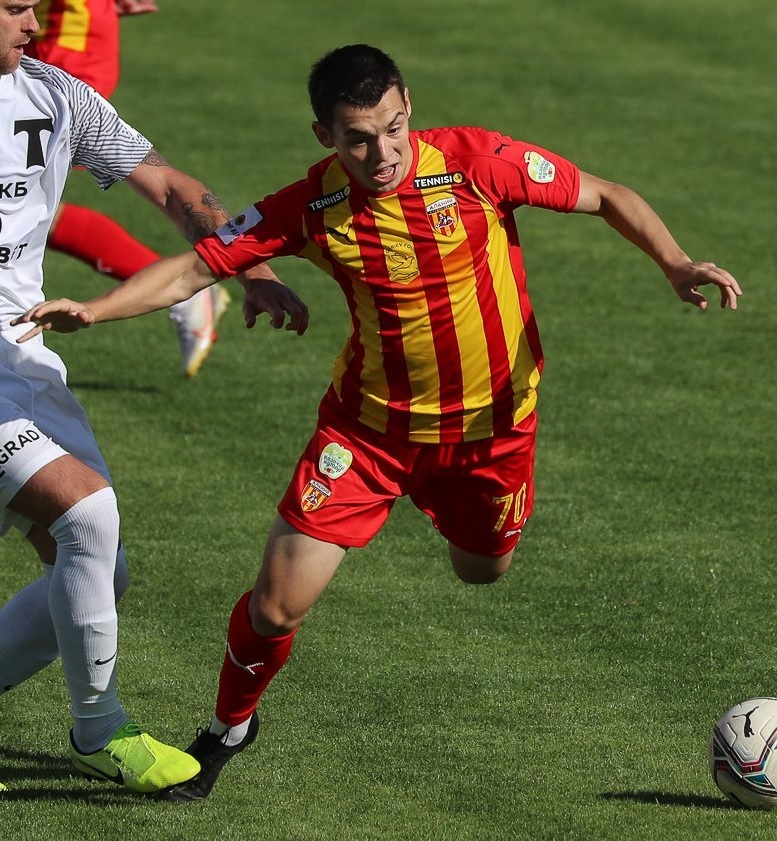
- Eldarushev with Alania in 2021

Personal information
- Full name: Abu-Said Islamutdinovich Eldarushev
- Date of birth: 17 October 2001 (age 25)
- Place of birth: Makhachkala, Russia
- Height: 1.86 m (6 ft 1 in)
- Position: Striker

Team information
- Current team: Rotor Volgograd
- Number: 11

Youth career
- Anzhi Makhachkala

Senior career*
| Years | Team | Apps | (Gls) |
| 2019 | Anzhi Makhachkala | 2 | (0) |
| 2019–2021 | Legion-Dynamo Makhachkala | 33 | (11) |
| 2021–2023 | Alania Vladikavkaz | 32 | (4) |
| 2023–2024 | Akron Tolyatti | 47 | (12) |
| 2024–2026 | Baltika Kaliningrad | 25 | (3) |
| 2025 | → Maxline Vitebsk (loan) | 15 | (3) |
| 2026 | → Rotor Volgograd (loan) | 13 | (4) |
| 2026– | Rotor Volgograd | 0 | (0) |
- * Club domestic league appearances and goals as of 16 May 2026

Abu-Said Islamutdinovich Eldarushev (Russian: Абу-Саид Исламутдинович Эльдарушев; born 17 October 2001) is a Russian football player who plays as a striker for Rotor Volgograd.

== Club career ==
He made his debut in the Russian Football National League for Alania Vladikavkaz on 17 July 2021 in a game against Krasnodar-2 and scored a goal on his debut.

Eldarushev made his Russian Premier League debut for Akron Tolyatti on 20 July 2024 in a game against Lokomotiv Moscow and scored a goal on his debut.

On 26 July 2024, Eldarushev signed a three-year contract with Baltika Kaliningrad.

On 27 July 2025, Eldarushev was loaned by Maxline Vitebsk.

On 27 January 2026, Eldarushev moved on a new loan to Rotor Volgograd, with an option to buy. On 3 July 2026, Eldarushev transfer to Rotor was made permanent.

== Career statistics ==
As of match played 24 May 2025

| Club | Season | League | | | Cup | | Continental | | Other | | Total | |
| Club | Season | Division | Apps | Goals | Apps | Goals | Apps | Goals | Apps | Goals | Apps | Goals |
|---|---|---|---|---|---|---|---|---|---|---|---|---|
| Anzhi Makhachkala | 2019–20 | Russian Second League | 2 | 0 | 1 | 0 | – | | – | | 3 | 0 |
| Legion-Dynamo Makhachkala | 2019–20 | Russian Second League | 4 | 0 | – | | – | | – | | 4 | 0 |
| Legion-Dynamo Makhachkala | 2020–21 | Russian Second League | 29 | 11 | 2 | 0 | – | | – | | 31 | 11 |
| Legion-Dynamo Makhachkala | Total | | 33 | 11 | 2 | 0 | 0 | 0 | 0 | 0 | 35 | 11 |
| Alania Vladikavkaz | 2021–22 | Russian First League | 23 | 3 | 2 | 0 | – | | – | | 25 | 3 |
| Alania Vladikavkaz | 2022–23 | Russian First League | 9 | 1 | 3 | 1 | – | | – | | 12 | 2 |
| Alania Vladikavkaz | Total | | 32 | 4 | 5 | 1 | 0 | 0 | 0 | 0 | 37 | 5 |
| Akron Tolyatti | 2022–23 | Russian First League | 14 | 3 | 5 | 1 | – | | – | | 19 | 4 |
| Akron Tolyatti | 2023–24 | Russian First League | 32 | 8 | 3 | 2 | – | | 2 (Note: Appearances in the promotion play-offs) | 0 | 37 | 10 |
| Akron Tolyatti | 2024–25 | Russian Premier League | 1 | 1 | 0 | 0 | — | | — | | 1 | 1 |
| Akron Tolyatti | Total | | 47 | 12 | 8 | 3 | 0 | 0 | 2 | 0 | 57 | 15 |
| Baltika Kaliningrad | 2024–25 | Russian First League | 25 | 3 | 1 | 0 | – | | – | | 26 | 3 |
| Career total | | | 139 | 30 | 17 | 4 | 0 | 0 | 2 | 0 | 158 | 34 |
