= Vladislav Pospelov =

Russian footballer (born 2006)

Personal information
- Full name: Vladislav Denisovich Pospelov
- Date of birth: 25 September 2006 (age 20)
- Height: 1.81 m (5 ft 11 in)
- Positions: Left winger; right winger

Team information
- Current team: Baltika Kaliningrad
- Number: 42

Youth career
- –2021: Lokomotiv St. Petersburg
- 2022–2023: Almaz-Antey St. Petersburg
- 2023–2024: Baltika Kaliningrad

Senior career*
Years	Team	Apps	(Gls)
2024–	Baltika-2 Kaliningrad	38	(5)
2025–	Baltika Kaliningrad	15	(0)
- * Club domestic league appearances and goals as of 8 November 2026

Vladislav Denisovich Pospelov (Russian: Владислав Денисович Поспелов; born 25 September 2006) is a Russian football player who plays as a left winger or right winger for Baltika Kaliningrad and Baltika-2 Kaliningrad.

== Career ==
Pospelov made his debut in the Russian Premier League for Baltika Kaliningrad on 7 December 2025 in a game against Krylia Sovetov Samara.

== Career statistics ==
As of 8 November 2026

Club	Season	League			Cup		Total	
Club	Season	Division	Apps	Goals	Apps	Goals	Apps	Goals
Baltika-2 Kaliningrad	2024	Russian Second League B	8	1	–		8	1
Baltika-2 Kaliningrad	2025	Russian Second League B	26	2	–		26	2
Baltika-2 Kaliningrad	2026	Russian Second League B	4	2	–		4	2
Baltika-2 Kaliningrad	Total		38	5	0	0	38	5
Baltika Kaliningrad	2025–26	Russian Premier League	2	0	1	0	3	0
Baltika Kaliningrad	2026–27	Russian Premier League	13	0	3	1	16	1
Baltika Kaliningrad	Total		15	0	4	1	19	1
Career total			53	5	4	1	57	6
