= Andrei Mendel =

Russian footballer

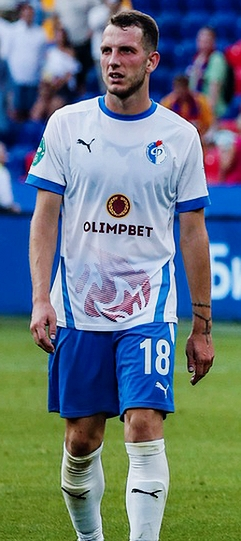
- Mendel with Fakel Voronezh in 2022

Personal information
- Full name: Andrei Semyonovich Mendel
- Date of birth: 17 April 1995 (age 31)
- Place of birth: Krasnoselskoye, Russia
- Height: 1.86 m (6 ft 1 in)
- Position: Defensive midfielder

Team information
- Current team: Baltika Kaliningrad
- Number: 8

Senior career*
Years	Team	Apps	(Gls)
2013–2014	Biolog-Novokubansk	11	(0)
2014–2015	Torpedo Armavir	20	(0)
2015	Druzhba Maykop	14	(0)
2016	Chernomorets Novorossiysk	8	(0)
2016–2018	Afips Afipsky	38	(1)
2018–2019	Chernomorets Novorossiysk	26	(3)
2019–2020	Khimki	23	(1)
2019	→ Khimki-M	1	(0)
2020	→ Volgar Astrakhan (loan)	0	(0)
2020–2021	Volgar Astrakhan	31	(1)
2021–2024	Fakel Voronezh	76	(4)
2024–	Baltika Kaliningrad	51	(1)
- * Club domestic league appearances and goals as of 21 November 2026

Andrei Semyonovich Mendel (Russian: Андрей Семёнович Мендель; born 17 April 1995) is a Russian professional footballer who plays as a defensive midfielder for Baltika Kaliningrad. He also plays in the centre-back position.

== Club career ==
He made his debut in the Russian Second Division for Biolog-Novokubansk on 4 August 2013 in a game against FC Mashuk-KMV Pyatigorsk.

He made his Russian Football National League debut for Khimki on 7 July 2019 in a game against Luch Vladivostok.

Mendel made his Russian Premier League debut for Fakel Voronezh on 17 July 2022 against Krasnodar.

On 28 May 2024, Mendel left Fakel as his contract expired.

== Career statistics ==
As of 21 November 2026

Club	Season	League			Cup		Other		Total	
Club	Season	Division	Apps	Goals	Apps	Goals	Apps	Goals	Apps	Goals
Biolog-Novokubansk	2013–14	Russian Second League	11	0	–		–		11	0
Torpedo Armavir	2014–15	Russian Second League	20	0	1	0	–		21	0
Druzhba Maykop	2015–16	Russian Second League	14	0	–		–		14	0
Chernomorets Novorossiysk	2015–16	Russian Second League	8	0	–		–		8	0
Afips Afipsky	2016–17	Russian Second League	16	0	2	0	–		18	0
Afips Afipsky	2017–18	Russian Second League	22	1	2	0	–		24	1
Afips Afipsky	Total		38	1	4	0	0	0	42	1
Chernomorets Novorossiysk	2018–19	Russian Second League	26	3	3	0	–		29	3
Khimki-M	2019–20	Russian Second League	1	0	–		–		1	0
Khimki	2019–20	Russian First League	23	1	3	0	2 (Note: Appearances in the FNL Cup)	0	28	1
Volgar Astrakhan	2019–20	Russian First League	0	0	–		–		0	0
Volgar Astrakhan	2020–21	Russian First League	31	1	1	0	–		32	1
Volgar Astrakhan	Total		31	1	1	0	0	0	32	1
Fakel Voronezh	2021–22	Russian First League	35	3	2	0	–		37	3
Fakel Voronezh	2022–23	Russian Premier League	26	1	1	0	2 (Note: Appearances in the relegation play-offs)	0	29	1
Fakel Voronezh	2023–24	Russian Premier League	15	0	3	0	–		18	0
Fakel Voronezh	Total		76	4	6	0	2	0	84	4
Baltika Kaliningrad	2024–25	Russian First League	23	0	0	0	–		23	0
Baltika Kaliningrad	2025–26	Russian Premier League	15	0	2	1	–		17	1
Baltika Kaliningrad	2026–27	Russian Premier League	13	1	1	0	–		14	1
Baltika Kaliningrad	Total		51	1	3	1	0	0	54	2
Career total			298	11	21	1	4	0	324	12
