= 2024–25 FC Baltika Kaliningrad season =

FC Baltika Kaliningrad
2024–25 season
- Manager: Aleksandr Grishchenko
- Stadium: Kaliningrad Stadium
- Russian First League: 9th
- Russian Cup: Pre-season
- Biggest win: Baltika Kaliningrad 2–0 Chernomorets Novorossiysk

The 2024–25 season is the 71st season in the history of FC Baltika Kaliningrad, and the club's first season back in the Russian First League. In addition to the domestic league, the team is scheduled to participate in the Russian Cup.

== Friendlies ==
2 July 2024 Friendly	Baltika Kaliningrad (Russia)	1–0	(Russia) SKA-Khabarovsk
	Bazelyuk 29' (o.g.)

6 July 2024 Friendly	Lokomotiv Moscow (Russia)	4–1	(Russia) Baltika Kaliningrad
18:00 UTC+3

== Competitions ==
=== Overall record ===
Competition	First match	Last match	Starting round	Record							
Competition	First match	Last match	Starting round	Pld	W	D	L	GF	GA	GD	Win %
Russian First League	14 July 2024		Matchday 1	4	1	3	0	4	2	+2	25.00
Russian Cup				0	0	0	0	0	0	+0	—
Total				4	1	3	0	4	2	+2	25.00

Last updated: 2 August 2024
Source: Soccerway

=== Russian First League ===
==== League table ====
Pos	Team	Pld	W	D	L	GF	GA	GD	Pts	Promotion, qualification or relegation
1	Baltika Kaliningrad (C, P)	34	19	12	3	50	18	+32	69	Promotion to Premier League
2	Torpedo Moscow (Note: The owner and the general director of Torpedo were arrested on 19 June 2025 and later charged with attempting to bribe a referee during the 2024–25 season. Russian Football Union conducted their own investigation. On 10 July 2025, Torpedo was excluded from the RPL for the 2025–26 season, cancelling their promotion. They remained in the Russian First League.)	34	17	14	3	51	25	+26	65	
3	Chernomorets Novorossiysk (Note: Chernomorets was not issued the 2025–26 RPL license and was replaced in the play-offs by Sochi.)	34	19	7	8	51	34	+17	64	
4	Ural Yekaterinburg	34	16	11	7	50	38	+12	59	Qualification to Premier League play-offs
5	Sochi (O, P)	34	16	9	9	55	34	+21	57	Qualification to Premier League play-offs

Source: Soccerway
Rules for classification: 1) Points; 2) Head-to-head points; 3) Head-to-head matches won; 4) Head-to-head goal difference; 5) Head-to-head goals scored; 6) Head-to-head away goals scored; 7) Matches won; 8) Goal difference; 9) Goals scored; 10) Away matches won; 11) Away goals scored; 12) Best disciplinary record (3 points for red card, 1 point for yellow card); 13) Drawing lots. If teams tied on points did not play an equal number of head-to-head games, head-to-head criteria and disciplinary record are not used for positioning. If 1st- and 2nd-placed teams are tied in the final standings on the first 12 criteria, a winner is determined in an additional play-off game, with no extra time and a penalty-shootout if tied at the end of regulation, instead of drawing lots.
(C) Champions; (O) Play-off winners; (P) Promoted

==== Results summary ====
Overall								Home						Away					
Pld	W	D	L	GF	GA	GD	Pts	W	D	L	GF	GA	GD	W	D	L	GF	GA	GD
28	18	8	2	44	14	+30	62	9	5	0	21	4	+17	9	3	2	23	10	+13

Last updated: 13 April 2025.
Source: soccerway

==== Results by round ====
Round	1	2	3	4	5	6	7	8	9	10	11	12	13	14	15	16	17	18	19	20	21	22	23	24	25	26	27	28	29	30	31	32	33	34
Ground	A	A	H	H	A	A	H	A	H	A	H	A	H	A	A	H	H	A	A	H	H	H	H	A	A	H	A	H	H	A	H	A	H	A
Result	D	D	D	W	D	L	W	W	W	L	D	W	D	W	W	W	W	W	W	W	W	D	D	W	W	W	W	W	W	D	L	W		
Position	9	11	10	9	8	12	7	6	4	4	6	5	4	4	2	2	2	2	1	1	1	1	1	1	1	1	1	1						

Updated to match(es) played on 13 April 2025. Source: worldfootball
A = Away; H = Home; W = Win; D = Draw; L = Loss

==== Matches ====
The tentative match schedule was released on 27 June.

14 July 2024 1	Rodina Moscow	0–0	Baltika Kaliningrad	Moscow
19:30 UTC+3				Stadium: Sapsan Arena; Attendance: 758; Referee: Anton Frolov

21 July 2024 2	Sochi	1–1	Baltika Kaliningrad	Sochi
19:00 UTC+3	Bart 32'		Malyarov 68'	Stadium: Fisht Olympic Stadium; Attendance: 5,796; Referee: Ivan Abrosimov

26 July 2024 3	Baltika Kaliningrad	1–1	Ufa	Kaliningrad
20:15 UTC+3	Pryakhin 56'		Gurenko 35'	Stadium: Kaliningrad Stadium; Attendance: 10,755; Referee: Aleksandr Mashlyakevich

2 August 2024 4	Baltika Kaliningrad	2–0	Chernomorets Novorossiysk	Kaliningrad
20:00 UTC+3	Alex Fernandes 13' (pen.), 39'			Stadium: Kaliningrad Stadium

10 August 2024 5	Sokol Saratov	1–1	Baltika Kaliningrad	Saratov
18:00 UTC+3	Ivan Churikov 90+1' (yellow card) 90+1'	Report	Eldarushev 72'; Pryakhin (yellow card) 78'	Stadium: Lokomotiv Stadium; Attendance: 5,020; Referee: (Russia) Nikolay Voloshin

16 August 2024 6	Rotor Volgograd	2–0	Baltika Kaliningrad	Volgograd
20:30 MST	Nikita Plotnikov (yellow card) 37'; Shumskikh 40'; Bolotov (yellow card) 46'; Mikhail Maltsev (red card) 48'; Kukharchuk 89'; Gleb Shilnikov (yellow card) 90+1'	Report	Avanesyan (yellow card) 24'; Saus (yellow card) 90'; Stefanovich (yellow card) 90+3'	Stadium: Volgograd Arena; Attendance: 22,118; Referee: (Russia) Artur Fedorov

25 August 2024 7	Baltika Kaliningrad	1–0	KAMAZ	Kaliningrad
20:00 MST	Saus (yellow card) 38'; Avanesyan (yellow card) 58'; Andrade (yellow card) 58'; Nikishin 87'	Report	Gorelov (yellow card) 58'; Roman Zashchepkin (yellow card) 58'	Stadium: Rostec Arena; Attendance: 12,170; Referee: (Russia) Sergey Cheban

31 August 2024 8	Yenisey	1–2	Baltika Kaliningrad	Krasnoyarsk
11:00 MST	Chukanov (yellow card) 3'; Samoylov (yellow card) 56'; Andrey Mazurin (yellow card) 74'; Lomakin 85'	Report	Nikishin 23'; Antipin 48' (o.g.); Petrov (yellow card) 90+4'	Stadium: Central Stadium; Attendance: 3,716; Referee: (Russia) Roman Galimov

9 September 2024 9	Baltika Kaliningrad	2–1	Tyumen	Kaliningrad
22:15 MST	Alex 27' (pen.); Eldarushev 44'; Petrov (yellow card) 76'	Report	Shavlokhov 12' (yellow card) 89'; Sukhoruchenko (yellow card) 90+3'	Stadium: Rostec Arena; Attendance: 9,405; Referee: (Russia) Sergey Kulikov

16 September 2024 10	Torpedo Moscow	2–1	Baltika Kaliningrad	Khimki
20:30 MST	Netfullin 43' (pen.); Sokolov (yellow card) 51'; Maksimov 63'; Gorbunov (yellow card) 77'	Report	Avanesyan (yellow card) 12'; Lisakovich 53'; Pryakhin (yellow card) 61'	Stadium: Arena Khimki; Attendance: 1,091; Referee: (Russia) Ivan Saraev

21 September 2024 11	Baltika Kaliningrad	0–0	Arsenal Tula	Kaliningrad
22:15 MST	Pryakhin (yellow card) 65'	Report	Popov (yellow card) 28'	Stadium: Rostec Arena; Attendance: 14,108; Referee: (Russia) Anatoliy Zhabchenko

29 September 2024 12	Chayka	0–1	Baltika Kaliningrad	Peschanokopskoye
19:00 MST	Arbuzov (yellow card) 39'; Yevdokimov (yellow card) 55'; Karmayev (yellow card) 61'; Khokhlachyov (yellow card) 90+2'	Report	Lisakovich 62' (pen.); Petrov (yellow card) 67'; Borisko (yellow card) 90+5'	Stadium: Chayka Central Stadium; Attendance: 1,156; Referee: (Russia) Anton Frolov

6 October 2024 13	Baltika Kaliningrad	0–0	Neftekhimik	Kaliningrad
20:00 MST	Mendel (yellow card) 61'	Report	Tolstopyatov (yellow card) 65'; Petrov (yellow card) 83'; Kakhidze (yellow card) 90+4'	Stadium: Rostec Arena; Attendance: 12,763; Referee: (Russia) Kirill Silantyev

13 October 2024 14	Alania Vladikavkaz	0–2	Baltika Kaliningrad	Grozny
18:00 MST	Toboyev (yellow card) 12'	Report	Andrade (yellow card) 22'; Eldarushev 53'; Pryakhin 59'; Alex (yellow card) 90+1'	Stadium: Sultan Bilimkhanov Stadium; Attendance: 477; Referee: (Russia) Andrey Fisenko

20 October 2024 15	Shinnik	1–3	Baltika Kaliningrad	Yaroslavl
16:00 MST	Sukhomlinov (yellow card) 10'; Artemy Kosogorov 61'; Fyodorov (yellow card) 90'; Chyorny (yellow card) 90+6'	Report	Lisakovich 6' 11' (pen.); Petrov 34'; Terentyev (yellow card) 90+6'	Stadium: Shinnik Stadium; Attendance: 2,540; Referee: (Russia) Konstantin Averyanov

26 October 2024 16	Baltika Kaliningrad	2–1	Ural	Kaliningrad
20:00 MST	Eldarushev (yellow card) 37'; Lisakovich 40'; Andrade (yellow card) 51'; Varatynov 58'; Pryakhin (yellow card) 90+2'	Report	Yegorychev 6'	Stadium: Rostec Arena; Attendance: 14,235; Referee: (Russia) Anton Frolov

3 November 2024 17	Baltika Kaliningrad	2–0	SKA-Khabarovsk	Kaliningrad
19:00 MST	Mokhammad 9' (yellow card) 23'; Nikita Miroshnichenko 82' (o.g.)	Report	Zhuravlyov (yellow card) 76'; Poyarkov (yellow card) 80'	Stadium: Rostec Arena; Attendance: 17,127; Referee: (Russia) Vladimir Falov

9 November 2024 18	Neftekhimik	1–2	Baltika Kaliningrad	Nizhnekamsk
18:00 MST	Shiltsov (yellow card) 28'; Yemelyanov 42'	Report	Saus (yellow card) 39'; Andrade (yellow card) 56'; Osipov 63'; Kavalyow 73'; Mokhammad (yellow card) 90+2'	Stadium: Neftekhimik Stadium; Attendance: 658; Referee: (Russia) Kirill Silantyev

16 November 2024 19	KAMAZ	0–1	Baltika Kaliningrad	Naberezhnye Chelny
16:00 MST	Marugin (yellow card) 28'; Tananeyev (yellow card) 40'; Karaev (yellow card) 56'	Report	Eldarushev (yellow card) 22'; Pryakhin (yellow card) 34'; Gassama 86'	Stadium: KAMAZ Stadium; Attendance: 815; Referee: (Russia) Igor Egorov

23 November 2024 20	Baltika Kaliningrad	2–1	Rodina Moscow	Kaliningrad
18:00 MST	Kavalyow 7'; Varatynov (yellow card) 20' (goal) 28'; Saus (yellow card) 73'	Report	Yushin (yellow card) 58'; Abdusalamov 68'	Stadium: Rostec Arena; Attendance: 8,315; Referee: (Russia) Oleg Sokolov

29 November 2024 21	Baltika Kaliningrad	3–0	Alania Vladikavkaz	Kaliningrad
19:00 MST	Pryakhin 21' 45'; Nikishin 80'	Report	Tsallagov (yellow card) 54'; Butayev (yellow card) 57'	Stadium: Rostec Arena; Attendance: 10,147; Referee: (Russia) Inal Tanashev

2 March 2025 22	Baltika Kaliningrad	0–0	Shinnik	Kaliningrad
18:00 MST	Titkov (yellow card) 78'	Report	John (yellow card) 36'; Artyom Malakhov (yellow card) 64'; Zagré (yellow card) 82'; Artemy Kosogorov (yellow card) 87'; Fyodorov (yellow card) 90+5'	Stadium: Rostec Arena; Attendance: 11,921; Referee: (Russia) Anton Frolov

10 March 2025 23	Baltika Kaliningrad	0–0	Rotor Volgograd	Kaliningrad
19:00 MST	Pryakhin (yellow card) 19'; Titkov (yellow card) 85'	Report	Pliyev (yellow card) 5'; Shumskikh (yellow card) 38'; Semyonov (yellow card) 78'; Safronov (yellow card) 82'	Stadium: Rostec Arena; Attendance: 9,975; Referee: (Russia) Mikhail Cheremnykh

16 March 2025 24	Tyumen	0–1	Baltika Kaliningrad	Tyumen
14:00 MST	Poroykov (yellow card) 25'	Report	Petrov 75'	Stadium: Geolog Stadium; Attendance: 2,925; Referee: (Russia) Evgeniy Galimov

23 March 2025 25	Ufa	0–6	Baltika Kaliningrad	Ufa
11:00 MST		Report	Gil 7'; Titkov 14' 21'; Petrov 29'; Saus (yellow card) 44'; Pryakhin (yellow card) 67' (goal) 86'; Stefanovich 78'	Stadium: BetBoom Arena; Attendance: 1,620; Referee: (Russia) Inal Tanashev

30 March 2025 26	Baltika Kaliningrad	4–0	Chayka	Kaliningrad
19:00 MST	Titkov 9' 19'; Chernov 15'; Gil 17'; Mendel (yellow card) 62'; Kavalyow (yellow card) 82'	Report	Kamil Ibragimov (yellow card) 59'	Stadium: Rostec Arena; Attendance: 13,375; Referee: (Russia) Oleg Sokolov

6 April 2025 27	SKA-Khabarovsk	1–2	Baltika Kaliningrad	Khabarovsk
8:00 MST	Gongadze 26'	Report	Pryakhin (yellow card) 45'; Gil 45+2'; Andrade (yellow card) 47'; Lisakovich 52' (pen.); Osipov (yellow card) 67'	Stadium: Lenin Stadium; Attendance: 4,327; Referee: (Russia) Vladislav Tselovalnikov

13 April 2025 28	Baltika Kaliningrad	2–0	Sochi	Kaliningrad
18:00 MST	Titkov 39' (yellow card) 53'; Andrade 47'; Mendel (yellow card) 59'; Gassama (yellow card) 76'	Report	Kaynov (yellow card) 50'	Stadium: Rostec Arena; Attendance: 21,391; Referee: (Russia) Ranel Ziyakov

20 April 2025 29	Baltika Kaliningrad	–	Sokol Saratov	Kaliningrad
18:00 MST				Stadium: Rostec Arena

=== Russian Cup ===
25 September 2024 Round Four	Luki-Energiya	1-1 (1–3 p)	Baltika	Velikiye Luki
19:30	Spodarets 16' (pen.)	Report	Alex 18'	Stadium: Ekspress Stadium; Attendance: 2,236; Referee: (Russia) Mikhail Plisko

16 October 2024 Round Five	Torpedo Moscow	0-4	Baltika	Khimki
20:30	Chervyakov (yellow card) 24'; Baytukov (yellow card) 86'	Report	Alex 19' (pen.) 50'; Stefanovich 37'; Zazvonkin 45+1'	Stadium: Arena Khimki; Attendance: 704; Referee: (Russia) Evgeniy Galimov

29 October 2024 Round Six	Baltika	0-1	Ural	Kaliningrad
20:00	Saus (yellow card) 63'; Ivan Zazvonkin (yellow card) 90+2'	Report	Malkevich (yellow card) 45'; Beveyev 48'; Ivan Kuznetsov (yellow card) 90+4'	Stadium: Rostec Arena; Attendance: 9,154; Referee: (Russia) Vladislav Tselovalnikov
