= Levan Mikadze =

Georgian footballer (born 1973)

Personal information
- Date of birth: 13 September 1973 (age 53)
- Place of birth: Sukhumi, Georgian SSR, Soviet Union
- Height: 1.82 m (6 ft 0 in)
- Position: Defender

Senior career*
Years	Team	Apps	(Gls)
1990	Gorda Rustavi	36	(1)
1991	Egrisi Senaki	8	(0)
1991–1993	Tskhumi Sokhumi	34	(1)
1994–1997	Odishi Zugdidi	85	(5)
1997–1998	Pogoń Szczecin	16	(0)
1998–1999	Dinamo Tbilisi	25	(2)
1999–2000	Lokomotivi Tbilisi	27	(1)
2001–2002	CSKA / Arsenal Kyiv	33	(0)
2001	→ CSKA-2 Kyiv	2	(0)
2002	Lokomotivi Tbilisi	4	(1)
2002–2004	Kryvbas Kryvyi Rih	26	(1)
2004	MTZ-RIPO Minsk	11	(0)
2005	Liepājas Metalurgs	25	(1)
2006–2007	Baltika Kaliningrad	24	(0)

International career
2000	Georgia	1	(0)
- * Club domestic league appearances and goals

Levan Mikadze or Levan Miqadze (born 13 September 1973) is a Georgian former professional footballer who played as a defender. He played his only cap on 26 April 2000.

He changed his playing name to Lavrenti Mikadze (his brother's name) and his birth date to 20 November 1978 (his brother's birthday) later in his career, after starting to play under his real name of Levan.

Mikadze signed for Russian Premier League side Anzhi Makhachkala in February 2000, but left the club before the start of the season.
