= Jonathan John =

Nigerian footballer

Personal information
- Date of birth: 9 May 2001 (age 25)
- Place of birth: Kaduna, Nigeria
- Height: 1.79 m (5 ft 10 in)
- Position: Defender

Team information
- Current team: Naftan Novopolotsk
- Number: 42

Senior career*
Years	Team	Apps	(Gls)
2020–2021	Sucleia	12	(0)
2021	Slutsk	1	(0)
2022–2023	Gomel	16	(1)
2024	Smorgon	12	(3)
2024–2025	Shinnik Yaroslavl	22	(1)
2026–	Naftan Novopolotsk	9	(0)
- * Club domestic league appearances and goals as of 6 July 2026

Jonathan John (born 9 May 2001) is a Nigerian professional footballer who plays as a defender for Naftan Novopolotsk.
