= Maksim Shnaptsev =

Russian footballer

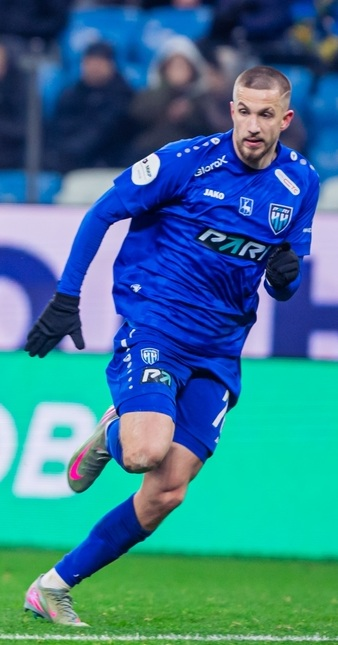
- Shnaptsev with Pari NN in 2025

Personal information
- Full name: Maksim Andreyevich Shnaptsev
- Date of birth: 19 April 2004 (age 22)
- Place of birth: Moscow, Russia
- Height: 1.82 m (6 ft 0 in)
- Positions: Left-back; right-back

Team information
- Current team: Baltika Kaliningrad
- Number: 19

Youth career
- –2023: Lokomotiv Moscow

Senior career*
| Years | Team | Apps | (Gls) |
| 2023–2026 | Pari Nizhny Novgorod | 43 | (0) |
| 2026– | Baltika Kaliningrad | 3 | (0) |

International career^{‡}
| 2018–2019 | Russia U15 | 9 | (0) |
| 2019–2020 | Russia U16 | 9 | (0) |
| 2023 | Russia U19 | 2 | (0) |
| 2025– | Russia U21 | 2 | (0) |
- * Club domestic league appearances and goals as of 16 September 2026 ‡ National team caps and goals as of 8 September 2025

Maksim Andreyevich Shnaptsev (Russian: Максим Андреевич Шнапцев; born 19 April 2004) is a Russian football player who plays as a left-back or right-back for Baltika Kaliningrad.

== Career ==
On 20 July 2023, Shnaptsev signed a four-year contract with Russian Premier League club Pari Nizhny Novgorod.

He made his RPL debut for Pari NN on 22 July 2023 in a game against Zenit St. Petersburg.

On 17 June 2026, Shnaptsev moved to Baltika Kaliningrad and signed a contract until 30 June 2030.

== Career statistics ==
As of match played 16 September 2026

Appearances and goals by club, season and competition
| Club | Season | League | | | Cup | | Other | | Total | |
| Club | Season | Division | Apps | Goals | Apps | Goals | Apps | Goals | Apps | Goals |
|---|---|---|---|---|---|---|---|---|---|---|
| Pari Nizhny Novgorod | 2023–24 | Russian Premier League | 12 | 0 | 3 | 0 | 2 (Note: Appearances in the relegation play-offs) | 0 | 17 | 0 |
| Pari Nizhny Novgorod | 2024–25 | Russian Premier League | 8 | 0 | 5 | 0 | — | | 13 | 0 |
| Pari Nizhny Novgorod | 2025–26 | Russian Premier League | 23 | 0 | 2 | 0 | — | | 25 | 0 |
| Pari Nizhny Novgorod | Total | | 43 | 0 | 10 | 0 | 2 | 0 | 55 | 0 |
| Baltika Kaliningrad | 2026–27 | Russian Premier League | 3 | 0 | 1 | 0 | — | | 4 | 0 |
| Career total | | | 46 | 0 | 11 | 0 | 2 | 0 | 59 | 0 |
