= Artyom Sidorenko =

Russian professional footballer (born 2007)

Personal information
- Full name: Artyom Yevgenyevich Sidorenko
- Date of birth: 3 January 2007 (age 19)
- Height: 1.70 m (5 ft 7 in)
- Position: Central midfielder

Team information
- Current team: Akron Tolyatti
- Number: 17

Youth career
- –2025: Krasnodar

Senior career*
Years	Team	Apps	(Gls)
2025–2026	Krasnodar	0	(0)
2026	Nizhny Novgorod	6	(0)
2026–	Akron Tolyatti	1	(0)

International career^{‡}
2022–2023	Russia U16	5	(0)
2025	Russia U19	3	(0)
2026–	Russia U21	3	(0)
- * Club domestic league appearances and goals as of 1 November 2026 ‡ National team caps and goals as of 9 June 2026

Artyom Yevgenyevich Sidorenko (Russian: Артём Евгеньевич Сидоренко; born 3 January 2007) is a Russian football player who plays as a central midfielder for Akron Tolyatti.

== Career ==
Sidorenko was raised in the youth system of Krasnodar. He was first included in the senior team's matchday squad in the season closer of the 2024–25 season against Dynamo Moscow, as Krasnodar secured their first ever league title, but Sidorenko remained on the bench in the game.

On 11 February 2026, Sidorenko signed with Pari Nizhny Novgorod. Sidorenko made his debut in the Russian Premier League for Pari NN on 28 February 2026 in a game against Lokomotiv Moscow.

On 10 September 2026, Sidorenko moved to Akron Tolyatti with a four-year contract.

== Career statistics ==
As of 1 November 2026

Club	Season	League			Cup		Total	
Club	Season	Division	Apps	Goals	Apps	Goals	Apps	Goals
Krasnodar	2024–25	Russian Premier League	0	0	0	0	0	0
Krasnodar	2025–26	Russian Premier League	0	0	0	0	0	0
Krasnodar	Total		0	0	0	0	0	0
Nizhny Novgorod	2025–26	Russian Premier League	5	0	—		5	0
Nizhny Novgorod	2026–27	Russian First League	1	0	0	0	1	0
Nizhny Novgorod	Total		6	0	0	0	6	0
Akron Tolyatti	2026–27	Russian Premier League	1	0	1	0	2	0
Career total			7	0	1	0	8	0
