= FC Baltika-2 Kaliningrad =

Russian football club

- Full name: Football Club Baltika-2 Kaliningrad
- Founded: 2021
- Ground: Baltika Stadium
- Chairman: Ravil Izmaylov
- Manager: Vacant
- League: Russian Second League, Division B, Group 2
- 2026: 5th
- Website: bfu.fc-baltika.ru

FC Baltika-2 Kaliningrad (Russian: ФК «Балтика-2» (Калининград)) is a Russian football team based in Kaliningrad. It was founded in 2021 as the farm-club by FC Baltika Kaliningrad, together with the Immanuel Kant Baltic Federal University, under the name FC Baltika-BFU Kaliningrad. It received the third-tier license for the 2021–22 season. In January 2025, Baltika and BFU stopped their cooperation, with the club renamed to Baltika-2.

== Current squad ==
As of 11 September 2026, according to the Second League website.

Note: Flags indicate national team as defined under FIFA eligibility rules; some limited exceptions apply. Players may hold more than one non-FIFA nationality.

No.	Pos.	Nation	Player
3	DF	RUS	Ilya Kirsh
16	MF	RUS	Robert Zikrach
19	DF	RUS	Maksim Shnaptsev
26	DF	RUS	Ivan Belikov
30	DF	RUS	Timur Kasyanenko
33	FW	RUS	Aleksi Gvenetadze
35	GK	RUS	Ivan Gavrilov
36	GK	RUS	Andrey Tsitsilin
38	DF	RUS	Mikhail Sinyakov
42	MF	RUS	Vladislav Pospelov
43	DF	RUS	Nikita Bokov
45	DF	RUS	Yaroslav Banny
46	FW	RUS	Timofey Timofeyev
51	DF	RUS	Maksim Dmitriyev
52	MF	RUS	Magomed Ismailov
53	GK	RUS	Valery Alekseyev
54	MF	RUS	Matvey Daub
55	MF	RUS	Ivan Bogdan
56	GK	RUS	Daniil Rybintsev
57	MF	RUS	Eldzhat Mamedov
58	FW	RUS	Aleksandr Kuzmin
59	MF	RUS	Kirill Davidenko
60	MF	RUS	Georgy Makarov
61	MF	RUS	Maksim Kulik
62	FW	RUS	Ivan Grinko

No.	Pos.	Nation	Player
64	DF	RUS	Osman Gasanbekov
66	MF	RUS	Dmitry Begun
67	DF	RUS	Gordey Safargaleyev
68	DF	RUS	Mikhail Ryadno
70	FW	RUS	Ruslan Slavin
72	MF	RUS	Yevgeny Kim
75	MF	RUS	Artyom Babchuk
77	FW	RUS	Vladimir Pochechura
78	DF	RUS	Maksim Rusinov
81	GK	RUS	Ivan Kukushkin
82	MF	RUS	Artyom Makarov
83	DF	RUS	Ivan Safonov
84	MF	RUS	Nikita Gorokhov
85	DF	RUS	Yegor Donnikov
88	DF	RUS	Timofey Shchelkunov
89	MF	RUS	Boris Turava
90	MF	RUS	Artyom Medvedev
91	MF	RUS	Nikita Kolosov
93	FW	RUS	Arseny Avvakumov
95	GK	RUS	Timofey Mak
96	MF	RUS	Artyom Afanasyev
97	MF	RUS	Timur Alikberov
98	DF	RUS	German Iva
99	FW	RUS	Daniil Kiselyov
