= 2023–24 Russian First League =

Russian First League
- Season: 2023–24
- Dates: 15 July 2023 - June 2024
- Promoted: Khimki; Dynamo; Akron Tolyatti
- Relegated: Volgar; Kuban; Leningradets
- Matches: 306
- Goals: 670 (2.19 per match)
- Top goalscorer: Jonathan Okoronkwo (17 goals)
- Biggest home win: Akron 6–0 Kuban; 20 April 2024
- Biggest away win: Volgar 0–4 Rodina; 28 October 2023; Leningradets 0–4 Yenisey; 18 March 2024
- Highest scoring: Khimki 5–4 Sokol; 4 May 2024
- Longest winning run: 5 matches Akron; Arsenal; Dynamo; Rodina; Tyumen
- Longest unbeaten run: 15 matches Arsenal
- Longest winless run: 14 matches Kuban
- Longest losing run: 5 matches Chernomorets; Kuban; Leningradets; Volgar
- Highest attendance: 21,723; Dynamo 2–0 Rodina; 18 May 2024
- Lowest attendance: 124; SKA-Khabarovsk 0–1 Neftekhimik; 8 April 2024, played in St. Petersburg; Excluding the games played without fans
- All statistics correct as of 25 May 2024.

The 2023–24 Russian First League is the 32nd season of Russia's second-tier football league since the dissolution of the Soviet Union. The season began in July 2023, and had a 3-month winter break between game weeks 20 and 21 (November to March). In collaboration with VKontakte, a draft was held in June, giving players a chance to prove themselves to the clubs and to create an alternative culture of player selection.

== Stadia by capacity ==
Club	City	Stadium	Capacity
Akron	Tolyatti	Kristall Stadium, Zhigulyovsk	3,065
Alania	Vladikavkaz	Republican Spartak Stadium	32,464
Arsenal Tula	Tula	Arsenal Stadium	19,241
Chernomorets	Novorossiysk	Central Stadium	12,500
Dynamo Makhachkala	Makhachkala	Trud Stadium	5,600
KAMAZ	Naberezhnye Chelny	KAMAZ Stadium	6,248
Khimki	Khimki	Arena Khimki	18,636
Kuban Krasnodar	Krasnodar	Kuban Stadium	35,200
Leningradets	Roshchino	Roshchino Arena	1,500
Neftekhimik	Nizhnekamsk	Neftekhimik Stadium	3,100
Rodina Moscow	Moscow	Spartak Moscow Academy Stadium	3,077
SKA	Khabarovsk	Lenin Stadium	15,200
Shinnik Yaroslavl	Yaroslavl	Shinnik Stadium	22,990
Sokol	Saratov	Lokomotiv Stadium	15,000
Torpedo Moscow	Moscow	Eduard Streltsov Stadium	15,076
Tyumen	Tyumen	Geolog Stadium	13,057
Volgar Astrakhan	Astrakhan	Central Stadium	21,500
Yenisey	Krasnoyarsk	Central Stadium	15,000

1. Alania plays at Akhmat-Arena, Grozny, capacity 30,000, while their own stadium is under reconstruction
2. Dynamo plays at Anzhi Arena, Kaspiysk, capacity 26,500, when there is more ticket demand than Trud stadium capacity allows
3. Leningradets also plays at Petrovsky Stadium, Saint Petersburg, capacity 20,985
4. Rodina also plays at Sapsan Arena, capacity 6,000
5. SKA-Khabarovsk played their first March 2024 game at Fisht Olympic Stadium, Sochi, capacity 46,759, as the turf-heating system at their home stadium was out of order. Sochi is 6,880 km away from Khabarovsk. Then they moved to Kirovets Stadium in Saint Petersburg, capacity 3,000 before returning to Khabarovsk in late April.
6. Torpedo plays at Luzhniki Stadium, in the Luzhniki Olympic Complex, capacity 81,000, or at Arena Khimki, Khimki, capacity 18,636, while their own stadium is under reconstruction
7. Yenisey also plays at the indoor Football-Arena Yenisey, capacity 3,000, if the weather is too cold for an outdoor game

== Team changes ==
=== To First League ===
Promoted from Second League

- Chernomorets
- Sokol
- Leningradets
- Tyumen

Relegated from Premier League

- Khimki
- Torpedo Moscow

=== From First League ===
Relegated to Second League

- Veles
- Ufa
- Volga Ulyanovsk
- Krasnodar-2

Promoted to Premier League

- Rubin Kazan
- Baltika Kaliningrad

== Stadia by locations ==
Location of teams in 2023–24 First League.
Location of Moscow teams.

== League table ==
Pos	Team	Pld	W	D	L	GF	GA	GD	Pts	Promotion, qualification or relegation
1	Khimki (P)	34	20	6	8	56	39	+17	66	Promotion to Premier League
2	Dynamo Makhachkala (P)	34	18	7	9	37	19	+18	61	Promotion to Premier League
3	Akron Tolyatti (P)	34	17	8	9	48	26	+22	59	Qualification to Premier League play-offs
4	Arsenal Tula (Note: Arsenal initially did not receive the license for the 2024–25 Russian Premier League season, but later received it on appeal.) (Q)	34	13	16	5	39	25	+14	55 (Note: Head-to-head points: Arsenal 4, Rodina 1.)	Qualification to Premier League play-offs
5	Rodina Moscow	34	15	10	9	53	31	+22	55	
6	Yenisey Krasnoyarsk	34	15	6	13	55	40	+15	51 (Note: Head-to-head points: Yenisey 4, Shinnik 1)	
7	Shinnik Yaroslavl	34	14	9	11	39	41	−2	51	
8	Alania Vladikavkaz	34	12	13	9	42	42	0	49	
9	Tyumen	34	13	9	12	36	35	+1	48	
10	Torpedo Moscow	34	12	11	11	33	33	0	47	
11	Neftekhimik Nizhnekamsk	34	11	9	14	31	35	−4	42	
12	KAMAZ Naberezhnye Chelny	34	10	11	13	30	36	−6	41 (Note: Head-to-head points: KAMAZ 4, SKA-Khabarovsk 1.)	
13	SKA-Khabarovsk	34	11	8	15	33	36	−3	41	
14	Sokol Saratov	34	10	8	16	32	53	−21	38	
15	Chernomorets Novorossiysk	34	7	14	13	30	38	−8	35	
16	Leningradets (R)	34	8	10	16	27	44	−17	34 (Note: Head-to-head points: Leningradets 4, Volgar 1.)	Relegation to Second League
17	Volgar Astrakhan (R)	34	7	13	14	29	44	−15	34	Relegation to Second League
18	Kuban Krasnodar (R)	34	5	8	21	20	53	−33	23	Relegation to Second League

Source: Soccerway
Rules for classification: 1) Points; then in case of a two-way tie: 2) Head-to-head points; 3) Head-to-head goal difference; 4) Head-to-head away goals scored; 5) Matches won; 6) Goal difference; 7) Goals scored; 8) Away matches won; 9) Away goals scored; 10) Best disciplinary record (3 points for red card, 1 point for yellow card); 11) Drawing lots; in case of a three-or-more-way tie when all the teams tied on points played equal number of head-to-head games: 2) Head-to-head points; 3) Head-to-head matches won; 4) Head-to-head goal difference; 5) Head-to-head goals scored; 6) Head-to-head away goals scored; 7) Matches won; 8) Goal difference; 9) Goals scored; 10) Away matches won; 11) Away goals scored; 12) Best disciplinary record (3 points for red card, 1 point for yellow card); 13) Drawing lots; in case of a three-or-more-way tie when teams tied on points played a different number of head-to-head games: 2) Matches won; 3) Goal difference; 4) Goals scored; 5) Away matches won; 6) Away goals scored; 7) Drawing lots.
(P) Promoted; (Q) Qualified for Promotion Playoffs; (R) Relegated

== Positions by round ==
Team ╲ Round	1	2	3	4	5	6	7	8	9	10	11	12	13	14	15	16	17	18	19	20	21	22	23	24	25	26	27	28	29	30	31	32	33	34
Khimki	14	16	13	7	6	8	9	9	7	9	7	3	3	3	5	4	3	4	3	2	1	1	1	1	1	3	3	1	1	1	2	1	1	1
Dynamo Makhachkala	15	14	9	13	9	10	12	7	4	2	2	1	2	2	1	5	4	3	1	1	3	2	3	3	3	1	1	2	2	2	1	2	2	2
Akron Tolyatti	4	1	1	1	1	1	2	3	5	3	4	6	4	4	3	1	1	2	4	3	5	4	2	2	2	2	2	3	3	3	3	3	3	3
Arsenal Tula	10	13	16	10	14	14	15	13	13	13	13	12	10	10	6	6	6	6	5	5	2	3	4	4	4	4	4	4	4	4	5	4	4	4
Rodina Moscow	1	4	7	9	13	13	11	6	9	10	12	9	11	12	13	11	11	7	7	7	7	6	5	5	5	5	5	5	5	5	4	5	5	5
Yenisey Krasnoyarsk	6	8	10	17	11	12	8	12	12	15	11	13	14	15	14	10	12	8	10	10	8	10	9	9	9	9	9	9	9	9	6	8	6	6
Shinnik Yaroslavl	17	15	12	15	12	9	10	5	3	6	3	5	6	6	9	9	10	12	12	13	11	11	13	13	12	11	13	11	11	11	7	6	8	7
Alania Vladikavkaz	8	5	3	6	2	2	1	1	1	1	1	2	1	1	2	3	5	5	6	6	6	7	6	7	8	8	8	8	8	6	8	9	9	8
Tyumen	2	7	5	2	5	5	3	4	6	8	9	4	5	5	4	2	2	1	2	4	4	5	7	6	6	6	7	6	6	8	10	7	7	9
Torpedo Moscow	5	3	2	5	8	6	6	11	8	4	6	10	8	11	7	7	8	10	9	8	9	9	12	11	11	10	11	13	13	13	13	10	10	10
Neftekhimik Nizhnekamsk	7	10	11	12	16	16	17	17	16	16	15	16	15	14	10	13	13	13	13	12	10	8	8	8	7	7	6	7	7	7	9	11	11	11
KAMAZ Naberezhnye Chelny	16	9	14	8	7	7	7	8	10	12	8	11	13	7	8	12	7	9	8	9	12	12	10	12	14	12	10	12	12	12	11	12	12	12
SKA-Khabarovsk	3	2	4	4	3	4	5	10	11	7	10	7	7	8	12	8	9	11	11	11	13	13	11	10	10	14	12	10	10	10	12	13	13	13
Sokol Saratov	18	11	6	3	4	3	4	2	2	5	5	8	9	9	11	14	14	14	15	16	15	15	15	16	16	16	15	15	15	16	15	15	15	14
Chernomorets Novorossiysk	9	12	15	14	10	11	14	15	15	11	14	15	12	13	15	15	15	15	17	18	18	16	16	14	13	13	14	14	14	14	14	14	14	15
Leningradets	11	6	8	11	15	15	13	14	14	14	16	14	16	16	16	16	18	16	14	14	14	14	14	15	15	15	16	16	16	15	16	16	16	16
Volgar Astrakhan	12	18	17	18	18	18	18	18	18	18	18	18	18	18	18	18	17	18	16	17	17	18	18	18	18	18	17	17	17	17	17	17	17	17
Kuban Krasnodar	13	17	18	16	17	17	16	16	17	17	17	17	17	17	17	17	16	17	18	15	16	17	17	17	17	17	18	18	18	18	18	18	18	18

Promotion
Play-offs
Relegation to 2024–25 Russian Second League

Source: everysport.com

== Results by round ==
Team ╲ Round	1	2	3	4	5	6	7	8	9	10	11	12	13	14	15	16	17	18	19	20	21	22	23	24	25	26	27	28	29	30	31	32	33	34
Akron Tolyatti	W	W	W	W	L	D	L	D	L	W	D	L	W	W	W	W	W	D	L	D	L	W	W	D	W	D	W	D	L	W	W	L	L	W
Alania Vladikavkaz	D	W	W	L	W	W	W	W	D	L	W	D	D	W	L	D	D	D	L	D	L	D	W	L	D	L	L	W	D	D	L	D	W	W
Arsenal Tula	D	D	L	W	L	D	D	W	L	W	D	D	W	D	W	D	W	W	W	W	W	D	D	D	L	W	D	D	D	D	W	D	W	L
Chernomorets Novorossiysk	D	D	D	D	W	D	D	D	L	W	L	D	W	L	L	D	L	L	L	L	L	W	W	W	W	D	L	D	D	L	D	D	L	L
Dynamo Makhachkala	L	D	W	L	W	D	D	W	W	W	W	W	L	W	D	L	W	W	W	L	L	W	L	D	W	W	W	D	D	W	W	L	W	L
KAMAZ Naberezhnye Chelny	L	W	L	W	W	D	D	D	D	L	W	L	L	W	D	L	W	D	D	L	D	L	W	L	D	W	W	L	W	D	D	L	L	L
Khimki	L	L	W	W	W	L	D	D	W	L	W	W	D	W	D	W	W	D	W	D	W	W	L	L	W	L	W	W	W	W	L	W	W	W
Kuban Krasnodar	L	L	L	W	D	L	L	D	L	L	D	L	W	W	L	D	W	L	D	W	L	D	L	D	L	L	L	L	D	L	L	L	L	L
Leningradets	D	W	D	L	L	D	W	D	L	D	L	W	L	L	L	L	L	W	W	W	D	L	L	D	D	L	L	D	L	W	L	D	W	L
Neftekhimik Nizhnekamsk	W	L	L	D	L	L	L	L	W	W	D	D	W	D	W	L	L	D	D	W	W	W	W	D	W	L	W	L	D	D	L	L	L	L
Rodina Moscow	W	D	D	D	L	L	W	W	D	D	L	W	L	L	D	W	L	W	D	W	W	W	W	W	D	W	L	L	D	D	W	W	L	W
Shinnik Yaroslavl	L	L	W	L	W	W	D	W	W	L	W	L	D	L	L	D	D	L	D	D	W	L	L	D	W	W	L	W	W	D	W	W	D	W
SKA-Khabarovsk	W	W	L	D	W	D	L	L	D	W	L	W	L	D	L	W	L	L	D	D	D	L	W	W	L	L	W	W	W	D	L	L	L	L
Sokol Saratov	L	W	W	W	D	W	L	W	D	L	L	D	L	D	L	L	L	L	D	L	W	D	L	L	D	L	W	L	L	L	D	W	W	W
Torpedo Moscow	W	W	D	L	L	W	D	L	W	W	L	L	D	L	W	D	L	D	D	W	L	D	L	W	L	W	D	D	L	W	D	W	D	W
Tyumen	W	L	W	W	L	D	W	L	D	D	D	W	D	W	W	W	W	W	L	L	L	D	L	D	L	W	L	D	D	L	L	W	W	L
Volgar Astrakhan	L	L	L	L	L	D	D	L	D	D	D	D	W	L	W	L	W	L	W	D	D	L	D	L	D	L	W	D	D	L	D	W	L	W
Yenisey Krasnoyarsk	W	L	L	L	W	D	W	L	D	L	W	L	D	L	W	W	L	W	L	L	W	L	W	W	L	W	L	W	D	D	D	W	W	W

Source: Soccerstats.com (in English)
W = Win; D = Draw; L = Lose

== Results ==
Home \ Away	AKR	ALA	ARS	CHE	DYN	KAM	KHI	KUB	LEN	NEF	ROD	SHI	SKA	SOK	TOR	TYU	VOL	YEN
Akron Tolyatti		1–0	5–1	0–0	3–1	2–0	0–2	6–0	0–0	0–0	0–2	3–1	2–1	2–0	2–1	1–2	0–1	3–1
Alania Vladikavkaz	1–1		1–1	1–2	2–0	2–0	1–4	3–0	1–0	1–0	1–2	1–1	2–1	0–0	2–0	1–1	1–2	2–1
Arsenal Tula	1–0	3–3		2–0	0–0	2–0	0–2	3–1	0–0	1–0	1–0	2–0	1–0	3–0	1–1	0–0	0–0	2–0
Chernomorets Novorossiysk	0–0	1–1	2–1		0–0	0–0	1–3	3–0	0–1	0–1	0–0	1–0	3–0	5–3	1–2	0–1	1–1	0–2
Dynamo Makhachkala	0–1	3–0	0–0	1–0		0–1	1–0	2–0	2–0	1–0	2–0	1–1	2–0	2–0	0–2	3–1	3–0	1–0
KAMAZ Naberezhnye Chelny	1–0	1–1	0–0	1–0	2–1		2–2	2–0	1–1	0–1	1–3	4–0	1–0	1–2	1–0	2–1	2–2	1–1
Khimki	2–2	2–2	3–2	2–1	1–0	1–0		1–1	2–1	1–3	2–0	0–1	0–0	5–4	1–2	3–0	0–0	1–0
Kuban Krasnodar	0–1	0–1	0–0	2–2	1–1	1–2	0–1		0–2	1–1	1–0	0–2	1–1	0–0	2–1	1–1	2–0	1–2
Leningradets	1–1	3–3	1–1	0–1	1–2	0–0	1–3	0–1		1–2	1–1	0–1	0–1	0–2	2–3	1–0	0–0	0–4
Neftekhimik Nizhnekamsk	1–1	3–0	0–0	1–1	0–3	2–0	0–1	2–1	1–2		1–4	1–2	2–0	0–0	0–0	0–2	2–1	0–0
Rodina Moscow	0–1	1–2	1–1	4–0	0–0	1–0	1–2	1–0	2–0	3–0		1–4	1–1	4–0	2–0	1–1	3–0	2–1
Shinnik Yaroslavl	1–0	3–3	1–0	2–1	0–1	2–2	1–2	1–0	0–0	1–0	0–2		2–1	1–0	1–1	1–2	2–1	1–1
SKA-Khabarovsk	1–0	0–1	1–1	0–0	0–2	0–0	3–1	2–0	2–1	0–1	2–1	2–0		3–1	2–0	2–0	1–1	3–0
Sokol Saratov	0–1	0–0	0–3	0–0	1–0	1–1	1–0	1–3	0–1	2–2	1–1	3–2	1–0		0–2	2–1	1–0	0–2
Torpedo Moscow	1–0	0–0	1–1	1–1	2–0	1–0	1–2	1–0	2–3	2–1	1–1	1–1	2–0	0–1		0–0	0–3	1–0
Tyumen	0–2	0–1	1–2	1–1	0–0	2–0	3–1	3–0	4–0	0–3	2–2	0–2	1–0	2–0	0–0		1–0	1–0
Volgar Astrakhan	1–4	1–0	1–1	1–1	0–1	2–1	0–2	2–0	1–2	1–0	0–4	0–0	1–1	1–2	1–1	1–2		2–2
Yenisey Krasnoyarsk	2–3	4–1	0–2	3–1	0–1	2–0	4–1	2–0	0–1	2–0	2–2	4–1	4–2	5–3	1–0	2–0	1–1	

Updated to match(es) played on 25 May 2024. Source: First League (in Russian), Soccerway
Legend: Blue = home team win; Yellow = draw; Red = away team win.

== Season statistics ==
=== Top goalscorers ===
As of 25 May 2024

Rank	Player	Club	Goals
1	(Nigeria) Jonathan Okoronkwo	Arsenal	17
2	(Russia) Islam Mashukov	Alania	14
2	(Russia) Ivan Timoshenko	Rodina	14
4	(Russia) Aleksandr Lomakin	Yenisey Krasnoyarsk	13
4	(Russia) Aleksandr Rudenko	Khimki	13
6	(Russia) Igor Andreyev	Shinnik	11
7	(Russia) Astemir Gordyushenko	Rodina	10
8	(Russia) Serder Serderov	Dynamo	9
8	(Russia) Ilya Porokhov	Tyumen	9
8	(Russia) Dmitri Samoylov	Shinnik	9

== Attendances ==
#	Football club	Home games	Average attendance
1	FC Dynamo Makhachkala	17	9,347
2	FC Chernomorets Novorossiysk	17	6,459
3	FC Yenisey Krasnoyarsk	17	3,591
4	FC Arsenal Tula	17	3,523
5	FC Tyumen	17	3,109
6	FC Sokol Saratov	17	3,023
7	FC KAMAZ	17	2,225
8	FC Shinnik Yaroslavl	17	2,092
9	FC Torpedo Moscow	17	1,969
10	FC SKA-Khabarovsk	17	1,815
11	FC Volgar Astrakhan	17	1,650
12	FC Kuban Krasnodar	17	1,464
13	FC Khimki	17	1,342
14	FC Akron Tolyatti	17	993
15	FC Leningradets	17	959
16	FC Neftekhimik Nizhnekamsk	17	750
17	FC Rodina Moscow	17	670
18	FC Alania Vladikavkaz	17	503
