= 2022–23 Russian Second League =

Russian Second League
- Season: 2022–23
- Dates: 15 July 2022 – 10 June 2023
- Matches: 449
- Goals: 1,211 (2.7 per match)
- Total attendance: 374,987
- Average attendance: 835
- All statistics correct as of 10 June 2023.

The 2022–23 Russian Second League is the 31st season of Russia's third-tier football league since the dissolution of the Soviet Union. The season began on 15 July 2022. On 23 June 2022, the league was renamed from Russian Football National League 2 to Russian Second League.

The Russian Second League is geographically divided into 4 groups. The winners of each zone are automatically promoted into the First League. The bottom finishers of each zone lose professional status and are relegated into the Amateur Football League.

== Group 1 ==
=== First stage ===
==== Standings ====
Pos	Team	Pld	W	D	L	GF	GA	GD	Pts	Qualification
1	Chernomorets Novorossiysk	26	19	6	1	54	17	+37	63	Qualification to the Subgroup A (Promotion round)
2	Chayka Peschanokopskoye	26	16	7	3	33	9	+24	55	Qualification to the Subgroup A (Promotion round)
3	Rotor Volgograd	26	15	7	4	47	19	+28	52	Qualification to the Subgroup A (Promotion round)
4	Biolog-Novokubansk Progress	26	13	7	6	35	24	+11	46	Qualification to the Subgroup A (Promotion round)
5	Forte Taganrog	26	12	9	5	37	22	+15	45	Qualification to the Subgroup A (Promotion round)
6	Kuban-Holding Pavlovskaya	26	12	6	8	38	29	+9	42	Qualification to the Subgroup A (Promotion round)
7	Spartak Nalchik	26	10	7	9	36	30	+6	37	Qualification to the Subgroup B (Relegation round)
8	Druzhba Maykop	26	10	5	11	24	31	−7	35	Qualification to the Subgroup B (Relegation round)
9	SKA Rostov-on-Don	26	9	7	10	21	31	−10	34	Qualification to the Subgroup B (Relegation round)
10	Dynamo Stavropol	26	7	10	9	23	38	−15	31	Qualification to the Subgroup B (Relegation round)
11	Legion Makhachkala	26	5	6	15	22	43	−21	21	Qualification to the Subgroup B (Relegation round)
12	Mashuk-KMV Pyatigorsk	26	5	6	15	24	47	−23	21	Qualification to the Subgroup B (Relegation round)
13	Alania-2 Vladikavkaz	26	2	7	17	18	53	−35	13	Qualification to the Subgroup B (Relegation round)
14	Yessentuki	26	1	2	23	5	24	−19	5	Team withdrew

Source: Second League (in Russian), Soccerway

=== Second stage ===
At the second stage, the teams of subgroup A retain the statistics from the first stage (points, wins, draws, losses, scored and missed goals). The teams of subgroup B retain the statistics from the first stage only in matches against teams from subgroup. Thus, before the second stage, new standings are formed in subgroup B. The teams in each subgroup will play in a single round-robin tournament.

The winner of subgroup A becomes the winner of the group and can qualify to the First league. The two last teams of subgroup B (13th and 14th places in the group) eliminate from the Second League.

==== Subgroup A ====
===== Standings =====
Pos	Team	Pld	W	D	L	GF	GA	GD	Pts	Promotion or relegation
1	Chernomorets Novorossiysk	26	19	6	1	54	17	+37	63	Promotion to the First League
2	Chayka Peschanokopskoye	26	16	7	3	33	9	+24	55	
3	Rotor Volgograd	26	15	7	4	47	19	+28	52	
4	Biolog-Novokubansk Progress	26	13	7	6	35	24	+11	46	
5	Forte Taganrog	26	12	9	5	37	22	+15	45	
6	Kuban-Holding Pavlovskaya	26	12	6	8	38	29	+9	42	

First match(es) will be played: unknown. Source: Second League (in Russian), Soccerway

==== Subgroup B ====
===== Standings =====
Pos	Team	Pld	W	D	L	GF	GA	GD	Pts	Promotion or relegation
1	Druzhba Maykop	12	6	3	3	12	9	+3	21	
2	Spartak Nalchik	12	5	5	2	18	10	+8	20	
3	SKA Rostov-on-Don	12	5	5	2	11	7	+4	20	
4	Dynamo Stavropol	12	4	6	2	15	12	+3	18	
5	Legion Makhachkala	12	3	5	4	16	11	+5	14	
6	Mashuk-KMV Pyatigorsk	12	3	3	6	16	25	−9	12	
7	Alania-2 Vladikavkaz	12	0	5	7	10	24	−14	5	Relegation to the Amateur League

First match(es) will be played: unknown. Source: Second League (in Russian), Soccerway

== Group 2 ==
=== First stage ===
==== Subgroup 1 ====
===== Standings =====
Pos	Team	Pld	W	D	L	GF	GA	GD	Pts	Qualification
1	Leningradets Leningrad Oblast	20	16	3	1	48	11	+37	51	Qualification to the Subgroup A (Promotion round)
2	Zvezda Saint Petersburg	20	11	8	1	40	16	+24	41	Qualification to the Subgroup A (Promotion round)
3	Zorkiy Krasnogorsk	20	9	5	6	32	21	+11	32	Qualification to the Subgroup A (Promotion round)
4	Baltika-BFU Kaliningrad	20	7	8	5	25	19	+6	29	Qualification to the Subgroup A (Promotion round)
5	Yenisey-2 Krasnoyarsk	20	8	5	7	40	30	+10	29	Qualification to the Subgroup A (Promotion round)
6	Luki-Energiya Velikiye Luki	20	8	3	9	23	30	−7	27	Qualification to the Subgroup A (Promotion round)
7	Zenit-2 Saint Petersburg	20	7	6	7	31	31	0	27	Qualification to the Subgroup B (Relegation round)
8	Dynamo Saint Petersburg	20	5	8	7	24	24	0	23	Qualification to the Subgroup B (Relegation round)
9	Yadro Saint Petersburg	20	3	6	11	25	35	−10	15	Qualification to the Subgroup B (Relegation round)
10	Rodina-M Moscow	20	3	4	13	13	44	−31	13	Qualification to the Subgroup B (Relegation round)
11	Elektron Veliky Novgorod	20	3	4	13	13	53	−40	13	Qualification to the Subgroup B (Relegation round)

Source: Second League (in Russian), Soccerway

==== Subgroup 2 ====
===== Standings =====
Pos	Team	Pld	W	D	L	GF	GA	GD	Pts	Qualification
1	Tekstilshchik Ivanovo	20	13	3	4	40	15	+25	42	Qualification to the Subgroup A (Promotion round)
2	Murom	20	12	3	5	34	14	+20	39	Qualification to the Subgroup A (Promotion round)
3	Chertanovo Moscow	20	11	3	6	38	25	+13	36	Qualification to the Subgroup A (Promotion round)
4	Spartak Kostroma	20	8	5	7	28	25	+3	29	Qualification to the Subgroup A (Promotion round)
5	Torpedo Vladimir	20	8	4	8	24	31	−7	28	Qualification to the Subgroup A (Promotion round)
6	Dynamo Vologda	20	8	3	9	21	30	−9	27	Qualification to the Subgroup A (Promotion round)
7	FC Torpedo-2 Moscow	20	7	6	7	20	27	−7	27	Qualification to the Subgroup B (Relegation round)
8	Dynamo-2 Moscow	20	7	3	10	26	34	−8	24	Qualification to the Subgroup B (Relegation round)
9	Tver	20	6	4	10	21	22	−1	22	Qualification to the Subgroup B (Relegation round)
10	Khimik Dzerzhinsk	20	5	6	9	20	25	−5	21	Qualification to the Subgroup B (Relegation round)
11	Znamya Truda Orekhovo-Zuyevo	20	3	4	13	14	38	−24	13	Qualification to the Subgroup B (Relegation round)

Source: Second League (in Russian), Soccerway

=== Second stage ===
At the second stage, the teams of subgroup A retain the statistics from the first stage (points, wins, draws, losses, scored and missed goals). The teams of subgroup B retain the statistics from the first stage only in matches against teams from subgroup. Thus, before the second stage, new standings are formed in subgroup B. The teams in each subgroup will play in a double round-robin tournament.

The winner of subgroup A becomes the winner of the group and can qualify to the First league. The three last teams of subgroup B (8th, 9th and 10th places in the subgroup) eliminate from the Second League.

== Group 3 ==
=== First stage ===
==== Subgroup 1 ====
===== Standings =====
Pos	Team	Pld	W	D	L	GF	GA	GD	Pts	Qualification
1	Dynamo Bryansk	14	9	3	2	20	7	+13	30	Qualification to the Subgroup A (Promotion round)
2	Avangard Kursk	14	8	5	1	29	12	+17	29	Qualification to the Subgroup A (Promotion round)
3	Sakhalinets Moscow	14	7	3	4	22	17	+5	24	Qualification to the Subgroup A (Promotion round)
4	Ryazan	14	6	5	3	18	12	+6	23	Qualification to the Subgroup A (Promotion round)
5	Rodina-2 Moscow	14	6	5	3	24	12	+12	23	Qualification to the Subgroup A (Promotion round)
6	Strogino Moscow	14	6	5	3	19	16	+3	23	Qualification to the Subgroup A (Promotion round)
7	Metallurg Lipetsk	14	6	4	4	22	14	+8	22	Qualification to the Subgroup B (Relegation round)
8	Arsenal-2 Tula	14	6	2	6	24	21	+3	20	Qualification to the Subgroup B (Relegation round)
9	Spartak Tambov	14	3	3	8	15	27	−12	12	Qualification to the Subgroup B (Relegation round)
10	Sakhalin Yuzhno-Sakhalinsk	14	3	1	10	14	34	−20	10	Qualification to the Subgroup B (Relegation round)
11	Peresvet Domodedovo	14	3	0	11	15	31	−16	9	Qualification to the Subgroup B (Relegation round)
12	Kvant Obninsk	14	2	2	10	11	30	−19	8	Qualification to the Subgroup B (Relegation round)

Updated to match(es) played on 2 October 2022. Source: Second League (in Russian), Soccerway

==== Subgroup 2 ====
===== Standings =====
Pos	Team	Pld	W	D	L	GF	GA	GD	Pts	Qualification
1	Salyut Belgorod	14	9	3	2	32	10	+22	30	Qualification to the Subgroup A (Promotion round)
2	Kaluga	14	9	2	3	22	15	+7	29	Qualification to the Subgroup A (Promotion round)
3	Sokol Saratov	14	8	3	3	16	10	+6	27	Qualification to the Subgroup A (Promotion round)
4	Dynamo Vladivostok	14	7	2	5	23	14	+9	23	Qualification to the Subgroup A (Promotion round)
5	Saturn Ramenskoye	14	6	3	5	21	19	+2	21	Qualification to the Subgroup A (Promotion round)
6	Khimki-M	14	6	3	5	23	16	+7	21	Qualification to the Subgroup A (Promotion round)
7	Kosmos Dolgoprudny	14	6	2	6	29	17	+12	20	Qualification to the Subgroup B (Relegation round)
8	Kolomna	14	5	2	7	11	27	−16	17	Qualification to the Subgroup B (Relegation round)
9	Znamya Noginsk	14	4	3	7	12	21	−9	15	Qualification to the Subgroup B (Relegation round)
10	Balashikha	14	4	1	9	9	22	−13	13	Qualification to the Subgroup B (Relegation round)
11	SKA-Khabarovsk-2	14	3	4	7	14	19	−5	13	Qualification to the Subgroup B (Relegation round)
12	Zenit Penza	14	1	4	9	7	29	−22	7	Qualification to the Subgroup B (Relegation round)

Updated to match(es) played on 2 October 2022. Source: Second League (in Russian), Soccerway

=== Second stage ===
At the second stage, the teams of subgroup A retain the statistics from the first stage (points, wins, draws, losses, scored and missed goals). The teams of subgroup B retain the statistics from the first stage only in matches against teams from subgroup. Thus, before the second stage, new standings are formed in subgroup B. The teams in each subgroup will play in a double round-robin tournament.

The winner of subgroup A becomes the winner of the group and can qualify to the First league. The three last teams of subgroup B (10th, 11th and 12th places in the subgroup) eliminate from the Second League.

== Group 4 ==
=== First stage ===
==== Standings ====
Pos	Team	Pld	W	D	L	GF	GA	GD	Pts	Qualification
1	Tyumen	11	6	4	1	22	10	+12	22	Qualification to the Subgroup A (Promotion round)
2	Irtysh Omsk	11	6	3	2	13	9	+4	21	Qualification to the Subgroup A (Promotion round)
3	Chelyabinsk	11	6	3	2	16	10	+6	21	Qualification to the Subgroup A (Promotion round)
4	Amkar Perm	11	6	2	3	19	12	+7	20	Qualification to the Subgroup A (Promotion round)
5	Zenit-Izhevsk	11	5	3	3	20	15	+5	18	Qualification to the Subgroup A (Promotion round)
6	Novosibirsk	11	4	5	2	13	10	+3	17	Qualification to the Subgroup A (Promotion round)
7	Torpedo Miass	11	4	3	4	11	14	−3	15	Qualification to the Subgroup B (Relegation round)
8	Orenburg-2	11	3	5	3	15	17	−2	14	Qualification to the Subgroup B (Relegation round)
9	Nosta Novotroitsk	11	2	4	5	11	13	−2	10	Qualification to the Subgroup B (Relegation round)
10	Dynamo Barnaul	11	1	4	6	13	21	−8	7	Qualification to the Subgroup B (Relegation round)
11	Khimik-Avgust Vurnary	11	2	1	8	9	23	−14	7	Qualification to the Subgroup B (Relegation round)
12	Ural-2 Yekaterinburg	11	1	3	7	13	21	−8	6	Qualification to the Subgroup B (Relegation round)

Updated to match(es) played on 2 October 2022. Source: Second League (in Russian), Soccerway

=== Second stage ===
At the second stage, the teams of subgroup A retain the statistics from the first stage (points, wins, draws, losses, scored and missed goals). The teams of subgroup B retain the statistics from the first stage only in matches against teams from subgroup. Thus, before the second stage, new standings are formed in subgroup B. The teams in each subgroup will play in a single round-robin tournament.

The winner of subgroup A becomes the winner of the group and can qualify to the First league. The two last teams of subgroup B (11th and 12th places in the group) eliminate from the Second League.
