= FC Baltika Kaliningrad =

Russian football club

Baltika
- Full name: Football Club; Baltika Kaliningrad
- Nickname: Baltici
- Founded: 1954; 72 years ago
- Ground: Kaliningrad Stadium
- Capacity: 35,016
- Owner(s): Kaliningrad, Kaliningrad Oblast
- General director: Ravil Izmaylov
- Manager: Andrey Talalayev
- League: Russian Premier League
- 2025–26: 6th of 18
- Website: www.fc-baltika.ru
Home colours	Away colours

FC Baltika (Russian: Акционерное Общество «Футбольный клуб «Балтика») is a professional association football club based in Kaliningrad, Russia which plays in the Russian Premier League.

== History ==
The club was founded on 23 August 1954 as Pishchevik Kaliningrad. In 1958 the club was renamed Baltika.

The team entered the Soviet League in 1957 and played in Class B (1957–1965), Class A, Group 2 (1966–1970), and Second League (1971–1991). The best result was achieved in 1984, when Baltika won the regional group tournament.

In 1992 Baltika entered the Russian Second Division and won the regional tournament and promotion to the First Division. After a fourth-place finish in 1993 and third position in 1994 Baltika won the division in 1995. In 1996 Baltika achieved the best result in club's history, finishing 7th in the Top Division, the Russian Premier League. Baltika were relegated in 1998, spending a total of three seasons in the top flight. In 1998 Baltika participated in the Intertoto Cup and reached the third round.

Since then, Baltika played in the First Division, except for the 2002 and 2005 seasons which they spent in the Second Division.

In 2018–19 Russian Football National League, they finished 16th (a relegation spot). However, PFL zone East winners FC Sakhalin Yuzhno-Sakhalinsk did not apply for the FNL license, keeping Baltika in the league.

On 19 May 2023, Baltika secured a promotion to the Russian Premier League for the first time in 25 years.

In the 2023–24 Russian Cup, Baltika advanced to the Superfinal.

Baltika finished 15th in the league season and was relegated back to second tier after one year in the Premier League.

On 2 June 2024, Baltika lost the 2024 Russian Cup final to Zenit St. Petersburg with the score of 1–2, Baltika initially led 1–0 and conceded two goals in the 81st minute and in the 5th added minute.

On 10 May 2025, Baltika secured a top-2 finish in the First League season and promotion back to the Russian Premier League for 2025–26.

Baltika finished 6th in the 2025–26 Russian Premier League season, which was the best league position in club's history.

== Players ==
=== Current squad ===
As of 10 September 2026, according to the official Russian Premier League website.

Note: Flags indicate national team as defined under FIFA eligibility rules; some limited exceptions apply. Players may hold more than one non-FIFA nationality.

No.	Pos.	Nation	Player
1	GK	RUS	Yevgeni Latyshonok (on loan from Nizhny Novgorod)
2	DF	RUS	Sergey Varatynov
3	DF	RUS	Ilya Kirsh
4	DF	MLI	Nathan Gassama
5	MF	MAR	Aymane Mourid
7	MF	RUS	Konstantin Shiltsov
8	MF	RUS	Andrei Mendel
9	FW	NGR	Chinonso Offor
10	MF	RUS	Ilya Petrov
11	FW	RUS	Ilya Porokhov
14	MF	BIH	Stefan Kovač
18	DF	MAR	Fahd Moufi
19	DF	RUS	Maksim Shnaptsev
21	DF	PAN	Eduardo Anderson
22	DF	RUS	Mingiyan Beveyev
24	DF	FRA	Loris Mouyokolo

No.	Pos.	Nation	Player
25	DF	RUS	Aleksandr Filin
26	DF	RUS	Ivan Belikov
42	MF	RUS	Vladislav Pospelov
43	DF	RUS	Nikita Bokov
44	GK	RUS	Yegor Lyubakov
57	DF	RUS	Eldzhat Mamedov
59	DF	RUS	Timofey Timofeyev
64	DF	RUS	Osman Gasanbekov
66	DF	RUS	Dmitry Begun
68	DF	RUS	Mikhail Ryadno
69	FW	RUS	Yegor Golenkov
73	MF	RUS	Maksim Petrov
77	DF	BIH	Eldar Ćivić
81	GK	RUS	Ivan Kukushkin
91	FW	ESA	Brayan Gil
98	DF	RUS	German Iva

=== Out on loan ===
Note: Flags indicate national team as defined under FIFA eligibility rules; some limited exceptions apply. Players may hold more than one non-FIFA nationality.

No.	Pos.	Nation	Player
—	DF	RUS	Nikita Bozov (at Torpedo Moscow until 30 June 2027)
—	MF	RUS	Yaroslav Arbuzov (at Shinnik Yaroslavl until 30 June 2027)
—	MF	RUS	Irakli Manelov (at Rotor Volgograd until 30 June 2027)
—	FW	BRA	Alex Fernandes (at Navbahor Namangan until 31 December 2026)

No.	Pos.	Nation	Player
—	FW	RUS	Kirill Nikishin (at Neftekhimik Nizhnekamsk until 30 June 2027)
—	FW	RUS	Dmitry Nikitin (at Leningradets Leningrad Oblast until 30 June 2027)
—	FW	RUS	Kirill Stepanov (at Sibir Novosibirsk until 30 June 2027)
—	FW	NGR	Tenton Yenne (at Vanspor until 30 June 2027)

== Reserve team ==
Baltika's reserve team played professionally in the Russian Third League in 1994 as FC Baltika-d Kaliningrad and in the Russian Second Division in 2006 and 2007 as FC Baltika-2 Kaliningrad.

== Notable players ==
These players had international caps for their respective countries. Players whose name is listed in bold represented their countries while playing for Baltika.

USSR/Russia

- (Soviet Union) Sergei Shvetsov
- (Russia) (Commonwealth of Independent States) (Soviet Union) Oleg Sergeyev
- (Russia) **Mingiyan Beveyev**
- (Russia) Maksim Buznikin
- (Russia) Nikita Chernov
- (Russia) Vyacheslav Dayev
- (Russia) Soslan Dzhanayev
- (Russia) Andrei Fedkov
- (Russia) Lyubomir Kantonistov
- (Russia) Yevgeni Kharlachyov
- (Russia) Andrei Kondrashov
- (Russia) Vitaly Mattis
- (Russia) Ilya Lantratov
- (Russia) Yevgeni Latyshonok
- (Russia) Artyom Makarchuk
- (Russia) Tamerlan Musayev
- (Russia) **Maksim Petrov**
- (Russia) Pavel Pogrebnyak
- (Russia) Dmitry Stotsky
- (Russia) Sergei Terekhov
- (Russia) Daniil Utkin

Europe

- (Armenia) Artak Aleksanyan
- (Armenia) Aram Voskanyan
- (Armenia) **Robert Zebelyan**
- (Azerbaijan) Emin Agaev
- (Azerbaijan) Gurban Gurbanov
- (Azerbaijan) Mehdi Jannatov
- (Azerbaijan) Aslan Kerimov
- (Azerbaijan) **Dmitriy Kramarenko**
- (Azerbaijan) (Russia) Vladislav Lemish
- (Azerbaijan) Yuri Muzika
- (Belarus) **Vasili Baranov**
- (Belarus) **Syarhey Herasimets**
- (Belarus) **Kirill Kaplenko**
- (Belarus) Yury Kavalyow
- (Belarus) Alyaksandr Klimenka
- (Belarus) Andrei Lavrik
- (Belarus) Vitaly Lisakovich
- (Belarus) **Uladzimir Makowski**
- (Belarus) **Valer Shantalosau**
- (Belarus) Yuri Shukanov
- (Belarus) **Maksim Skavysh**
- (Belarus) Sergey Vekhtev
- (Estonia) **Taavi Rähn**
- (Georgia (country)) Zaza Janashia
- (Georgia (country)) Zviad Jeladze
- (Georgia (country)) Levan Mikadze
- (Georgia (country)) Tengiz Sichinava
- (Kazakhstan) Renat Dubinskiy
- (Kazakhstan) Dmitriy Galich
- (Kazakhstan) Dmitriy Lyapkin
- (Kazakhstan) **Maksim Nizovtsev**
- (Kazakhstan) **Aleksandr Sklyarov**
- (Latvia) **Aleksandrs Koliņko**
- (Latvia) Mihails Miholaps
- (Latvia) **Igors Troickis**
- (Latvia) **Aleksejs Višņakovs**
- (Latvia) **Maksims Rafaļskis**
- (Latvia) **Artūrs Zjuzins**
- (Lithuania) Vidas Alunderis
- (Lithuania) Vytautas Apanavičius
- (Lithuania) Ričardas Beniušis
- (Lithuania) **Orestas Buitkus**
- (Lithuania) **Rolandas Džiaukštas**
- (Lithuania) **Andrius Jokšas**
- (Lithuania) Kęstutis Kumža
- (Lithuania) Viktoras Olšanskis
- (North Macedonia) Goran Maznov
- (Moldova) **Valeriu Andronic**
- (Ukraine) Oleksandr Pomazun
- (Ukraine) Vladyslav Prudius
- (Ukraine) Serhiy Shyshchenko
- (Ukraine) Dmytro Topchiev

North America

- (El Salvador) **Brayan Gil**

South America

- (Bolivia) **Roberto Fernández**
- (Chile) Ángelo Henríquez
- (Colombia) Kevin Andrade

Africa

- (Ghana) Joel Fameyeh

Asia

- (Turkmenistan) Vyacheslav Krendelyov
- (Uzbekistan) **Andrei Fyodorov**
- (Uzbekistan) **Maksim Shatskikh**
- (Uzbekistan) **Andrei Vlasichev**

== Club staff ==
Position	Staff
Manager	(Russia) Andrey Talalayev
Assistant Manager	(Russia) Dmitri Michkov
First-Team Coach	(Russia) Leonid Tkachenko
First-Team Coach	(Belarus) Artsyom Buloychyk
Fitness Coach	(Russia) Mikhail Solovey
Club Doctor	(Russia) Ruslan Zasiev
Team Manager	(Russia) Evgeniy Buda
