= 2023–24 FC Krasnodar season =

FC Krasnodar
2023–24 season
- Manager: Vladimir Ivić (until 13 March); Murad Musayev (from 14 March)
- Stadium: Krasnodar Stadium
- Premier League: 2nd
- Russian Cup: Regions path Quarter-finals Stage 1
- Top goalscorer: League: Jhon Córdoba (15); All: Jhon Córdoba (18)
- Highest home attendance: 35,250 vs Zenit St.Petersburg (13 April 2024)
- Lowest home attendance: 11,128 vs Pari NN (4 October 2023)
- Average home league attendance: 23,623 (25 May 2024)

The 2023–24 season was FC Krasnodar's 16th season in existence and 12th consecutive in the Russian Premier League. They will also compete in the Russian Cup.

== Season events ==
On 3 July, Rustam Khalnazarov joined Arsenal Tula on loan for the season.

On 5 July, David Kokoyev joined Neftekhimik Nizhnekamsk on loan for the season. On the same day, Ifeanyi David Nduka amnd Jonathan Okoronkwo joined Arsenal Tula on loan for the season.

On 22 July, Mikhail Sukhoruchenko joined Alania Vladikavkaz on loan for the season.

On 6 August, Krasnodar announced the signing of Lucas Olaza from Real Valladolid on a two-year contract, with the option of an additional year.

On 18 August, Krasnodar announced the signing of Vítor Tormena from Braga on a four-year contract.

On 9 September, Magomed-Shapi Suleymanov joined Aris Thessaloniki on loan for the season.

On 12 September, Dmitri Pivovarov joined Chayka Peschanokopskoye on loan for the season.

On 9 January, Ilzat Akhmetov activated a clause in his contract allowing him to terminate contract with Krasnodar.

On 18 January, Krasnodar extended their contract with goalkeeper Matvei Safonov until the 31 January 2029.

On 21 January, Krasnodar announced the signing of Kevin Castaño from Cruz Azul on a contract until June 2028. On the same day, Krasnodar announced that they had extended their contract with João Batxi until 30 June 2027.

On 1 February, Mikhail Sukhoruchenko returned to Krasnodar after his loan to Alania Vladikavkaz was ended early by mutual agreement.

On 3 February, Danila Gayvoronsky joined Chernomorets Novorossiysk on loan for the remainder of the season.

On 19 February, Aleksandr Yegurnev joined Khimik Dzerzhinsk on loan for the remainder of the season.

On 20 February, Dmitry Paderin joined Ural-2 Yekaterinburg on loan for the remainder of the season.

On 22 February, Krasnodar announced the signing of Victor Sá from Botafogo on a contract until June 2025.

On 5 March, Krasnodar extended their contract with Olakunle Olusegun until 30 June 2028.

On 13 March, Krasnodar terminated their contract with Head Coach Vladimir Ivić. The following day, 14 March, Krasnodar announced the return of Murad Musayev as Head Coach of the club, on a contract until the end of the season.

On 26 April, Krasnodar extended their contract with Sergei Petrov for an additional year, until 30 June 2025.

On 29 May, Krasnodar extended their contract with Murad Musayev until June 2026.

== Squad ==
As of match played 25 May 2024

Number	Name	Nationality	Position	Date of birth (age)	Signed from	Signed in	Contract ends	Apps.	Goals
Goalkeepers
1	Stanislav Agkatsev	(Russia)	GK	9 January 2002 (aged 22)	Academy	2018		23	0
35	Roman Safronov	(Russia)	GK	15 February 2003 (aged 21)	Academy	2020		0	0
39	Matvei Safonov	(Russia)	GK	25 February 1999 (aged 25)	Academy	2016		175	0
Defenders
3	Vítor Tormena	(Brazil)	DF	1 January 1996 (aged 28)	Braga	2023	2027	27	0
4	Júnior Alonso	(Paraguay)	DF	9 February 1993 (aged 31)	Atlético Mineiro	2022	2025	54	1
15	Lucas Olaza	(Uruguay)	DF	21 July 1994 (aged 29)	Real Valladolid	2023	2025 (+1)	29	1
23	Aleksandr Ektov	(Russia)	DF	30 January 1996 (aged 28)	Orenburg	2023	2026	18	0
31	Kaio	(Brazil)	DF	18 September 1995 (aged 28)	Santa Clara	2019	2024	104	3
33	Georgy Arutyunyan	(Armenia)	DF	9 August 2004 (aged 19)	Academy	2023		10	1
82	Sergei Volkov	(Russia)	DF	9 September 2002 (aged 21)	Academy	2018		65	2
98	Sergei Petrov	(Russia)	DF	2 January 1991 (aged 33)	Krylia Sovetov	2013	2025	293	15
Midfielders
5	Kevin Castaño	(Colombia)	MF	29 September 2000 (aged 23)	Cruz Azul	2024	2028	10	0
6	Kevin Pina	(Cape Verde)	MF	27 January 1997 (aged 27)	Chaves	2022	2025	44	2
10	Eduard Spertsyan	(Armenia)	MF	7 June 2000 (aged 23)	Academy	2018		108	33
14	Mihajlo Banjac	(Serbia)	MF	10 November 1999 (aged 24)	TSC	2022	2026	65	3
20	Kady Borges	(Brazil)	MF	2 May 1996 (aged 28)	Qarabağ	2022	2026	44	7
53	Alexander Chernikov	(Russia)	MF	1 February 2000 (aged 24)	Academy	2019		86	4
88	Nikita Krivtsov	(Russia)	MF	18 August 2002 (aged 21)	Torpedo Vladimir	2021		84	11
Forwards
7	Victor Sá	(Brazil)	FW	27 March 1994 (aged 30)	Botafogo	2024	2025	13	1
9	Jhon Córdoba	(Colombia)	FW	11 May 1993 (aged 31)	Hertha BSC	2021	2025	85	45
11	João Batxi	(Angola)	FW	1 May 1998 (aged 26)	Chaves	2022	2027	56	4
21	Danil Karpov	(Russia)	FW	28 June 1999 (aged 24)	Tyumen	2022	2025	2	0
40	Olakunle Olusegun	(Nigeria)	FW	23 April 2002 (aged 22)	Botev Plovdiv	2022	2028	72	9
90	Moses Cobnan	(Nigeria)	FW	10 September 2002 (aged 21)	Železiarne Podbrezová	2023	2026	32	3
96	Alexander Koksharov	(Russia)	FW	20 December 2004 (aged 19)	Academy	2022		18	4
Away on loan
93	Magomed-Shapi Suleymanov	(Russia)	FW	16 December 1999 (aged 24)	Academy	2015		124	23
	Danila Gayvoronskiy	(Russia)	DF	7 September 2003 (aged 20)	Academy	2022		0	0
	Dmitri Pivovarov	(Russia)	DF	21 March 2000 (aged 24)	Academy	2021		5	0
	Mikhail Sukhoruchenko	(Russia)	DF	13 April 2003 (aged 21)	Academy	2021		2	0
	Grigory Zhilkin	(Russia)	DF	20 June 2003 (aged 20)	Academy	2021		1	0
	Ifeanyi David Nduka	(Nigeria)	MF	2 December 2003 (aged 20)	Botev Plovdiv	2022	2026	1	0
	David Kokoyev	(Russia)	MF	29 August 2002 (aged 21)	Academy	2021		2	0
	Dmitriy Paderin	(Russia)	MF	29 January 2004 (aged 20)	Academy	2022		0	0
	Jonathan Okoronkwo	(Nigeria)	FW	13 September 2003 (aged 20)	Botev Plovdiv	2022	2026	5	0
	Rustam Khalnazarov	(Russia)	FW	20 July 2000 (aged 23)	Academy	2022		1	0
	Aleksandr Yegurnev	(Russia)	FW	7 January 2002 (aged 22)	Kaluga	2023	2026	0	0
Players who left during the season
2	Yegor Sorokin	(Russia)	DF	4 November 1995 (aged 28)	Rubin Kazan	2020		67	0
7	Ilzat Akhmetov	(Russia)	MF	31 December 1997 (aged 26)	Unattached	2022	2024	61	7
	Alidzhoni Ayni	(Tajikistan)	MF	6 August 2004 (aged 19)	Regar-TadAZ	2022	2027	0	0

== Transfers ==
=== In ===
Date	Position	Nationality	Name	From	Fee	Ref.
21 June 2023	MF	(Russia)	Eduard Bagrintsev	Dubnica	Undisclosed	
23 June 2023	FW	(Russia)	Aleksandr Yegurnev	Kaluga	Undisclosed	
30 June 2023	DF	(Russia)	Aleksandr Ektov	Orenburg	Undisclosed	
4 July 2023	FW	(Russia)	Kamil Mullin	Rubin Kazan	Undisclosed	
9 July 2023	MF	(Russia)	Sergei Sharov	Spartak Kostroma	Undisclosed	
19 July 2023	DF	(Russia)	Vitali Shakhov	Spartak Kostroma	Undisclosed	
6 August 2023	DF	(Uruguay)	Lucas Olaza	Real Valladolid	Undisclosed	
18 August 2023	DF	(Brazil)	Vítor Tormena	Braga	Undisclosed	
5 January 2024	MF	(Colombia)	Kevin Castaño	Cruz Azul	Undisclosed	
22 February 2024	FW	(Brazil)	Victor Sá	Botafogo	Undisclosed	

=== Loans in ===
Date from	Position	Nationality	Name	From	Date to	Ref.
14 September 2023	FW	(Russia)	Yuri Zheleznov	Ural Yekaterinburg	End of season	

=== Out ===
Date	Position	Nationality	Name	To	Fee	Ref.
5 July 2023	FW	(Russia)	Oleg Oznobikhin	Ufa	Undisclosed	
12 July 2023	GK	(Russia)	Nikita Kokarev	Arsenal Tula	Undisclosed	
13 July 2023	FW	(Russia)	Vladislav Samko	Rodina Moscow	Undisclosed	
14 July 2023	DF	(Ecuador)	Cristian Ramírez	Ferencváros	Undisclosed	
15 July 2023	DF	(Russia)	Bogdan Logachev	Astrakhan	Undisclosed	
15 July 2023	FW	(Russia)	Mikhail Bersnev	Astrakhan	Undisclosed	
27 July 2023	FW	(Russia)	Omar Popov	Rodina-2 Moscow	Undisclosed	
31 July 2023	FW	(Russia)	Maksim Kutovoy	SKA-Khabarovsk	Undisclosed	
25 August 2023	MF	(Russia)	Roman Zashchepkin	KAMAZ Naberezhnye Chelny	Undisclosed	
8 September 2023	DF	(Russia)	Yegor Sorokin	Rubin Kazan	Undisclosed	
31 January 2024	GK	(Russia)	Aleksey Ploshchadny	Van	Undisclosed	
1 February 2024	DF	(Russia)	Dmitri Ivanov	KAMAZ Naberezhnye Chelny	Undisclosed	
7 February 2024	FW	(Russia)	Atsamaz Revazov	Kuban-Holding Pavlovskaya	Undisclosed	
16 February 2024	MF	(Tajikistan)	Alidzhoni Ayni	Samgurali Tsqaltubo	Undisclosed	
22 February 2024	DF	(Russia)	Stepan Komar	Metallurg Lipetsk	Undisclosed	

=== Loans out ===
Date from	Position	Nationality	Name	To	Date to	Ref.
3 July 2023	FW	(Russia)	Rustam Khalnazarov	Arsenal Tula	27 February 2024	
5 July 2023	MF	(Nigeria)	Ifeanyi David Nduka	Arsenal Tula	End of season	
5 July 2023	MF	(Russia)	David Kokoyev	Neftekhimik Nizhnekamsk	End of season	
5 July 2023	FW	(Nigeria)	Jonathan Okoronkwo	Arsenal Tula	End of season	
22 July 2023	DF	(Russia)	Mikhail Sukhoruchenko	Alania Vladikavkaz	1 February 2024	
9 September 2023	FW	(Russia)	Magomed-Shapi Suleymanov	Aris Thessaloniki	End of season	
12 September 2023	DF	(Russia)	Dmitri Pivovarov	Chayka Peschanokopskoye	End of season	
3 February 2024	DF	(Russia)	Danila Gayvoronsky	Chernomorets Novorossiysk	End of season	
19 February 2024	FW	(Russia)	Aleksandr Yegurnev	Khimik Dzerzhinsk	End of season	
20 February 2024	MF	(Russia)	Dmitry Paderin	Ural-2 Yekaterinburg	End of season	
11 March 2024	FW	(Russia)	Rustam Khalnazarov	Telavi		

=== Released ===
Date	Position	Nationality	Name	Joined	Date	Ref.
31 December 2023	GK	(Russia)	Vyacheslav Shatayev			
31 December 2023	DF	(Russia)	Ruslan Babayan	Kuban-Holding Pavlovskaya		
31 December 2023	DF	(Russia)	Stepan Komar	Metallurg Lipetsk		
31 December 2023	DF	(Russia)	Daniil Melnikov	Arsenal Tula		
31 December 2023	MF	(Russia)	Grigory Lovtsov			
31 December 2023	MF	(Russia)	Sergei Sharov	Amkar Perm		
31 December 2023	FW	(Russia)	Artyom Arutyunov	Arsenal Tula		
31 December 2023	FW	(Russia)	Vladislav Dys	Salyut Belgorod		
31 December 2023	FW	(Russia)	Emil Kishiyev			
31 December 2023	FW	(Russia)	Dmitry Kanayev	Forte Taganrog		
31 December 2023	FW	(Russia)	Nikita Kotylevsky			
31 December 2023	FW	(Russia)	Stepan Laskin			
31 December 2023	MF	(Armenia)	Robert Potinyan	Kompozit Pavlovsky Posad		
9 January 2024	MF	(Russia)	Ilzat Akhmetov	Zenit St.Petersburg	9 January 2024	

== Friendlies ==
8 July 2023	Krasnodar	2 – 2	Chernomorets Novorossiysk	Krasnodar
19:00 MSK (UTC+3)	Córdoba 12'; Krivtsov 39'; Samko (yellow card) 81'	Report	Adayev 51', 53'	Stadium: Krasnodar Academy Stadium; Referee: V.Shipkov

11 July 2023	Krasnodar	3 – 0	Kuban Krasnodar	Krasnodar
19:00 MSK (UTC+3)	Chernikov (yellow card) 11'; Córdoba 30', 37'; Spertsyan (yellow card) 59'; Cobnan 76'	Report	Takazov (yellow card) 40'; Ukaki (yellow card) 79'	Stadium: Krasnodar Academy Stadium; Referee: A.Zhabchenko

15 July 2023	Krasnodar	2 – 2	Sochi	Krasnodar
19:00 MSK (UTC+3)	Spertsyan 33'; Drkušić 40' (pen.); Batxi (yellow card) 90'	Report	Margasov 62'; Đorđević 74'; Batyrev (yellow card) 90'	Stadium: Krasnodar Academy Stadium; Referee: P.Kukuyan

3 February 2024	Krasnodar	3 – 0	Rodina Moscow	Dubai, United Arab Emirates
17:00 MSK (UTC+3)	Spertsyan 4'; Kady (yellow card) 30'; Olusegun 38'; Córdoba 66'	Report	Tananeyev (yellow card) 70'	Stadium: Dubai Sports City; Referee: M.Yakovlevich

7 February 2024	Krasnodar	1 – 0	Al Shabab	Dubai, United Arab Emirates
16:00 MSK (UTC+3)	Spertsyan 15' (pen.); Batxi (yellow card) 86'	Report	Santos (yellow card) 13'; Bahebri (yellow card) 42'	Stadium: Police Officers' Club Stadium; Referee: M.Yakovlevich

14 February 2024	Krasnodar	2 – 4	Astana	Abu Dhabi, United Arab Emirates
16:00 MSK (UTC+3)	Kady 38'; Córdoba 47'	Report	Tomasov 7'; Camara 23'; Ebong 35'; Karimov 66'	Stadium: Abu Dhabi Sports Complex; Referee: A.Sapaev

18 February 2024	Krasnodar	1 – 0	Ural Yekaterinburg	Dubai, United Arab Emirates
16:30 MSK (UTC+3)	Córdoba 74' (yellow card) 85'; Chernikov (yellow card) 89'	Report	Kashtanov (yellow card) 34'	Stadium: Jebel Ali Centre of Excellence; Referee: D.Dimitrievich

22 February 2024	Krasnodar	2 – 1	Torpedo Moscow	Dubai, United Arab Emirates
16:00 MSK (UTC+3)	Cobnan 56'; Córdoba 90'	Report	Ivankov 78'	Stadium: Abu Dhabi Sports Complex; Referee: A.Goshanov

== Competitions ==
=== Overview ===
Competition	First match	Last match	Starting round	Final position	Record							
Competition	First match	Last match	Starting round	Final position	Pld	W	D	L	GF	GA	GD	Win %
Premier League	21 July 2023	25 May 2024	Matchday 1	2nd	30	16	8	6	45	29	+16	53.33
Russian Cup	27 July 2023	12 March 2024	Group stage	Regions path Quarter-finals Stage 1	7	3	1	3	12	11	+1	42.86
Total					37	19	9	9	57	40	+17	51.35

Last updated: 25 May 2024
Source: Competitions

=== Premier League ===
==== League table ====
Pos	Team	Pld	W	D	L	GF	GA	GD	Pts
1	Zenit Saint Petersburg (C)	30	17	6	7	52	27	+25	57
2	Krasnodar	30	16	8	6	45	29	+16	56 (Note: Krasnodar is ahead of Dynamo on head-to-head points: Krasnodar 6, Dynamo 0)
3	Dynamo Moscow	30	16	8	6	53	39	+14	56
4	Lokomotiv Moscow	30	14	11	5	52	38	+14	53
5	Spartak Moscow	30	14	8	8	41	32	+9	50

Source: Premier Liga
Rules for classification: 1) Points; 2) Head-to-head points; 3) Head-to-head matches won; 4) Head-to-head goal difference; 5) Head-to-head goals scored; 6) Matches won; 7) Goal difference; 8) Goals scored; 9) 2022–23 position (not applicable to final standings); 10) Play-off. Note: if teams tied on points played an equal number of head-to-head games, head-to-head results are considered in aggregate, in a separate 'table'. If teams tied on points played a different number of head-to-head games, head-to-head criteria are considered in one-on-one pairs for each team against each other, then the teams are ordered by the number of one-on-one matchups they have advantage in.
(C) Champions

==== Results summary ====
Overall								Home						Away					
Pld	W	D	L	GF	GA	GD	Pts	W	D	L	GF	GA	GD	W	D	L	GF	GA	GD
30	16	8	6	45	29	+16	56	11	2	2	24	11	+13	5	6	4	21	18	+3

Last updated: 25 May 2024.
Source: See Results

==== Results by round ====
Round	1	2	3	4	5	6	7	8	9	10	11	12	13	14	15	16	17	18	19	20	22	23	24	25	21^{1}	26	27	28	29	30
Ground	A	H	H	A	H	A	H	A	H	A	H	A	A	H	A	A	H	H	H	A	A	A	H	H	H	A	H	A	A	H
Result	W	W	W	W	D	D	W	D	W	W	W	D	L	W	D	L	W	W	D	L	D	W	L	W	W	D	L	L	W	W
Position	1	1	2	1	1	1	1	1	1	1	1	1	1	1	1	2	1	1	1	2	2	2	2	2	2	2	2	3	3	2

Updated to match(es) played on 25 May 2024. Source: See Results
A = Away; H = Home; W = Win; D = Draw; L = Loss

==== Matches ====
The league fixtures were unveiled on 24 June 2023.

21 July 2023 1	Dynamo Moscow	1–3	Krasnodar	Moscow
19:00 MSK (UTC+3)	Fernández (yellow card) 55'; Smolov 61'	Report	Córdoba 27' (yellow card) 72'; Chernikov 35'; Batxi 53'	Stadium: VTB Arena; Attendance: 9,612; Referee: Kirill Levnikov

30 July 2023 2	Krasnodar	2–0	Sochi	Krasnodar
20:00 MSK (UTC+3)	Kaio 45+'; Córdoba 90+' (yellow card) 90+'	Report		Stadium: Krasnodar Stadium; Attendance: 13,290; Referee: Vladimir Moskalyov

4 August 2023 3	Krasnodar	1–0	Pari NN	Krasnodar
20:00 MSK (UTC+3)	Spertsyan 30' (pen.); Chernikov (yellow card) 90'	Report		Stadium: Krasnodar Stadium; Attendance: 12,217; Referee: Artyom Lyubimov

12 August 2023 4	Orenburg	0–2	Krasnodar	Orenburg
17:30 MSK (UTC+3)		Report	Kaio (yellow card) 32'; Spertsyan 67', 89' (pen.); Akhmetov (yellow card) 80'	Stadium: Gazovik Stadium; Attendance: 3,901; Referee: Vasily Kazartsev

19 August 2023 5	Krasnodar	1–1	Lokomotiv Moscow	Krasnodar
19:30 MSK (UTC+3)	Spertsyan (penalty missed) 22'; Olaza (yellow card) 39'; Akhmetov 47'; Chernikov (yellow card) 90+'	Report	Zhemaletdinov (yellow card) 54'; Miranchuk 90+'	Stadium: Krasnodar Stadium; Attendance: 22,492; Referee: Evgeniy Kukulyak

25 August 2023 6	Fakel Voronezh	0–0	Krasnodar	Voronezh
20:00 MSK (UTC+3)	Dolgov (yellow card) 56'	Report	Córdoba (penalty missed) 13'; Spertsyan (yellow card) 82'; Chernikov (yellow card) FT'	Stadium: Tsentralnyi Profsoyuz Stadion; Attendance: 13,471; Referee: Alexey Amelin

2 September 2023 7	Krasnodar	2–0	Spartak Moscow	Krasnodar
20:00 MSK (UTC+3)	Córdoba (yellow card) 20' (goal) 40'; Olusegun (yellow card) 58'; Spertsyan 84' (pen.); Kady (yellow card) 90+'	Report	Selikhov (yellow card) 81'; Medina (yellow card) 87'	Stadium: Krasnodar Stadium; Attendance: 32,766; Referee: Alexey Sukhoi

16 September 2023 8	Akhmat Grozny	1–1	Krasnodar	Grozny
16:30 MSK (UTC+3)	Oleynikov 3'; Kamilov (yellow card) 73'; Semyonov (yellow card) 88'	Report	Kady 40'	Stadium: Akhmat-Arena; Attendance: 3,768; Referee: Vladimir Moskalyov

24 September 2023 9	Krasnodar	2–0	Ural Yekaterinburg	Krasnodar
19:00 MSK (UTC+3)	Kady 54' (yellow card) 66'; Pina 76'; Chernikov (yellow card) 81'	Report	Miškić (yellow card) 70'	Stadium: Krasnodar Stadium; Attendance: 16,605; Referee: Vitali Meshkov

30 September 2023 10	Rubin Kazan	0–2	Krasnodar	Kazan
16:30 MSK (UTC+3)	Gritsayenko (yellow card) 85'	Report	Córdoba 24'; Batxi (yellow card) 71'; Olusegun 86'; Akhmetov (yellow card) 90+'	Stadium: Ak Bars Arena; Attendance: 5,557; Referee: Sergey Cheban

7 October 2023 11	Krasnodar	3–2	Rostov	Krasnodar
19:00 MSK (UTC+3)	Volkov (yellow card) 15'; Spertsyan 50' (yellow card) 61'; Chernikov (yellow card) 51'; Kady (yellow card) 60'; Komlichenko 80' (o.g.); Córdoba 90+'	Report	Glebov 23'; Mohebi 41' (yellow card) 71'; Melyokhin (yellow card) 54'; Komlichenko (yellow card) 78'	Stadium: Krasnodar Stadium; Attendance: 27,375; Referee: Rafael Shafeev

21 October 2023 12	Baltika Kaliningrad	2–2	Krasnodar	Kaliningrad
18:00 MSK (UTC+3)	Ostojić (yellow card) 22'; Kuzmin 23'; Henríquez 36'; Soto (yellow card) 45'; Guzina (yellow card) 56'	Report	Córdoba 17'; Batxi (yellow card) 45'; Spertsyan 61' (pen.)	Stadium: Kaliningrad Stadium; Attendance: 10,270; Referee: Evgeniy Kukulyak

29 October 2023 13	CSKA Moscow	1–0	Krasnodar	Moscow
19:30 MSK (UTC+3)	Chalov (yellow card) 35', (goal) 41'; Fayzullaev (yellow card) 90+2'	Report	Olaza (yellow card) 27'; Chernikov (yellow card) 44'; Batxi (yellow card) 72'	Stadium: VEB Arena; Attendance: 10,777; Referee: Kirill Levnikov

5 November 2023 14	Krasnodar	2–1	Krylia Sovetov	Krasnodar
14:00 MSK (UTC+3)	Córdoba 16'; Akhmetov (yellow card) 44'; Olusegun 73'; Banjac (yellow card) 87'	Report	Bijl (yellow card) 71'; Fernando (yellow card) 75'; Pisarsky 85'; Gorshkov (yellow card) 89'	Stadium: Krasnodar Stadium; Attendance: 31,055; Referee: Sergey Ivanov

21 November 2023 15	Zenit St.Petersburg	1–1	Krasnodar	Saint Petersburg
19:30 MSK (UTC+3)	Cassierra 70'	Report	Spertsyan 63'; Olaza (yellow card) 66'	Stadium: Krestovsky Stadium; Attendance: 46,695; Referee: Sergei Karasev

26 November 2023 16	Ural Yekaterinburg	3–1	Krasnodar	Yekaterinburg
14:00 MSK (UTC+3)	Emmerson 30'; Guilherme (yellow card) 44'; Yegorychev 59'; Kashtanov 86'	Report	Chernikov (yellow card) 3'; Córdoba 21' (red card) FT'; Spertsyan (yellow card) 45'; Olusegun (yellow card) 68'; Kady (yellow card) 90+'	Stadium: Central Stadium; Attendance: 5,155; Referee: Sergey Ivanov

3 December 2023 17	Krasnodar	2–1	Orenburg	Krasnodar
16:30 MSK (UTC+3)	Olusegun (yellow card) 24'; Spertsyan 45+' (pen.); Akhmetov 76'; Alonso (yellow card) 89'	Report	Kenyaykin (yellow card) 45+'; Oganesyan 51'; Pérez (yellow card) 56'	Stadium: Krasnodar Stadium; Attendance: 16,889; Referee: Artyom Chistyakov

10 December 2023 18	Krasnodar	1–0	CSKA Moscow	Krasnodar
19:45 MSK (UTC+3)	Chernikov (yellow card) 37'; Batxi (yellow card) 75'; Krivtsov 90', (yellow card) 90+1'	Report	Zdjelar (yellow card) 61'	Stadium: Krasnodar Stadium; Attendance: 32,793; Referee: Sergei Karasev

2 March 2024 19	Krasnodar	1–1	Rubin Kazan	Krasnodar
16:30 MSK (UTC+3)	Olusegun 36'; Spertsyan (yellow card) 66'; Sá (yellow card) 85'; Alonso (yellow card) 90+'	Report	Ashurmatov 90'	Stadium: Krasnodar Stadium; Attendance: 27,019; Referee: Alexey Sukhoi

8 March 2024 20	Rostov	2–1	Krasnodar	Rostov-on-Don
18:30 MSK (UTC+3)	Mohebi 25', 62'; Bayramyan (yellow card) 35'; Shchetinin (yellow card) 51'; Sako (yellow card) 59'; Chernov (yellow card) 61'; Osipenko (yellow card) 76'	Report	Chernikov (yellow card) 30'; Tormena (yellow card) 40'; Olusegun (yellow card) 42' (yellow-red card) 49'; Pina (yellow card) 44'; Córdoba 66'; Olaza (yellow card) 90+'	Stadium: Rostov Arena; Attendance: 16,668; Referee: Vasily Kazartsev

31 March 2024 22	Lokomotiv Moscow	1–1	Krasnodar	Moscow
19:30 MSK (UTC+3)	Nenakhov (yellow card) 8'; Morozov (yellow card) 25'; Fasson (yellow card) 36'; Barinov (yellow card) 56'; Glushenkov (yellow card) 72' (goal) 81'; Zhemaletdinov (yellow card) 88'	Report	Suleymanov 10' (o.g.); Krivtsov (yellow card) 11'; Chernikov (yellow card) 34'; Kaio (yellow card) 40'; Spertsyan (yellow card) 90+5'	Stadium: RZD Arena; Attendance: 9,327; Referee: Vladislav Bezborodov

6 April 2024 23	Pari NN	3–4	Krasnodar	Nizhny Novgorod
26:30 MSK (UTC+3)	Kalinsky 34'; Troshechkin 40'; Kukharchuk 87'	Report	Glushchenkov 8' (o.g.); Córdoba 13', 71'; Chernikov (yellow card) 48'; Batxi (yellow card) 58'; Spertsyan 79'	Stadium: Nizhny Novgorod Stadium; Attendance: 9,104; Referee: Evgeniy Bulanov

13 April 2024 24	Krasnodar	1–2	Zenit St.Petersburg	Krasnodar
17:00 MSK (UTC+3)	Olaza 16'; Tormena (yellow card) 41' (yellow-red card) 90'; Spertsyan (yellow card) 61'; Alonso (yellow card) 68'; Chernikov (yellow card) 87'; Batxi (yellow card) 90+'	Report	Cassierra 48'; Artur 63'; Eraković (yellow card) 72'; Douglas (yellow card) 80'	Stadium: Krasnodar Stadium; Attendance: 35,250; Referee: Sergey Ivanov

19 April 2024 25	Krasnodar	2–0	Fakel Voronezh	Krasnodar
19:00 MSK (UTC+3)	Victor Sá 60'; Kaio (yellow card) 70'; Córdoba 86'	Report	Yurganov (yellow card) 45+3'; Magal (yellow card) 51'; Kvekveskiri (yellow card) 90+1'	Stadium: Krasnodar Stadium; Attendance: 15,852; Referee: Kirill Levnikov

24 April 2024 21	Krasnodar	3–2	Baltika Kaliningrad	Krasnodar
20:30 MSK (UTC+3)	Córdoba 31', 60'; Spertsyan 50'; Olusegun (yellow card) 81'	Report	Lisakovich (yellow card) 42'; Kuzmin (yellow card) 55'; Kozlov 57', 89'	Stadium: Krasnodar Stadium; Attendance: 14,683; Referee: Pavel Kukuyan

29 April 2024 26	Krylia Sovetov	0–0	Krasnodar	Samara
13:00 MSK (UTC+3)	Orozco (yellow card) 25'; Saltykov (yellow card) 68'	Report	Kady (yellow card) 17'; Volkov (yellow card) 45' (yellow-red card) 64'; Ektov (yellow card) 72'	Stadium: Solidarnost Samara Arena; Attendance: 12,217; Referee: Sergei Karasev

4 May 2024 27	Krasnodar	0–1	Akhmat Grozny	Krasnodar
19:30 MSK (UTC+3)	Krivtsov (yellow card) 90+'; Alonso (yellow card) 90+'	Report	Kovachev (yellow card) 19'; Konaté 46'; Šatara (yellow card) 90+'	Stadium: Krasnodar Stadium; Attendance: 22,021; Referee: Vitali Meshkov

11 May 2024 28	Spartak Moscow	1–0	Krasnodar	Moscow
16:30 MSK (UTC+3)	Zobnin 35'	Report	Kaio (yellow card) 81'	Stadium: Lukoil Arena; Attendance: 21,843; Referee: Artyom Chistyakov

18 May 2024 29	Sochi	2–3	Krasnodar	Sochi
19:00 MSK (UTC+3)	Guarirapa 43', 73'; Drkušić (yellow card) 80'; Makarchuk (yellow card) 90+'	Report	Krivtsov 5'; Spertsyan 85' (pen.); Cobnan 90+'	Stadium: Fisht Olympic Stadium; Attendance: 8,782; Referee: Pavel Shadykhanov

25 May 2024 30	Krasnodar	1–0	Dynamo Moscow	Krasnodar
16:30 MSK (UTC+3)	Chernikov (yellow card) 8'; Córdoba 52'; Olaza (yellow card) 55'; Krivtsov (yellow card) 74'	Report	Laxalt (yellow card) 28'; Fernández (yellow card) 70'; Parshivlyuk (yellow card) 87' (yellow-red card) 89'	Stadium: Krasnodar Stadium; Attendance: 34,032; Referee: Sergei Karasev

=== Russian Cup ===
==== Group stage ====
Pos	Team	Pld	W	PW	PL	L	GF	GA	GD	Pts	Qualification
1	Spartak Moscow	6	4	0	0	2	16	12	+4	12	Qualification to the Knockout phase (RPL path)
2	Dynamo Moscow	6	3	0	2	1	12	10	+2	11 (Note: Head-to-head points: Dynamo 4, Krasnodar 2.)	Qualification to the Knockout phase (RPL path)
3	Krasnodar	6	3	1	0	2	12	9	+3	11	Qualification to the Knockout phase (regions path)
4	Pari Nizhny Novgorod	6	0	1	0	5	6	15	−9	2	

Source: Russian Football Union (in Russian), Soccerway
Rules for classification: 1) Points; 2) Head-to-head points; 3) Head-to-head matches won; 4) Head-to-head goal difference; 5) Head-to-head goals scored; 6) Matches won; 7) Goal difference; 8) Goals scored; 9) Penalty shoot-out goal difference; 10) Draw.
Notes:

27 July 2023 1	Krasnodar	1–2	Spartak Moscow	Krasnodar
20:00 MSK (UTC+3)	Spertsyan (red card) 44'; Córdoba (yellow card) 45+2'; Arutyunyan (yellow card) 88'; Borges (yellow card) 90' (goal) 90+5'	Report	Zobnin 21'; Ignatov (yellow card) 47'; Bogonda 67'; Klassen (yellow card) 79'	Stadium: Krasnodar Stadium; Attendance: 31,733; Referee: Aleksey Sukhoy

9 August 2023 2	Dynamo Moscow	4–3	Krasnodar	Moscow
20:45 MSK (UTC+3)	Fomin 31' (pen.) (yellow card) 88'; Grulyov 35', 67'; Fernández (yellow card) 79'; Ngamaleu (yellow card) 82'; Zakharyan 90+6'	Report	Agkatsev (yellow card) 30'; Krivtsov 41'; Cobnan 47'; Córdoba 77' (pen.)	Stadium: VTB Arena; Attendance: 14,259; Referee: Yevgeniy Bulanov

29 August 2023 3	Pari NN	0–1	Krasnodar	Nizhny Novgorod
19:30 MSK (UTC+3)	Karapuzov (yellow card) 35'; Maiga (yellow card) 53'	Report	Banjac (yellow card) 58'; Córdoba 88'	Stadium: Nizhny Novgorod Stadium; Attendance: 12,381; Referee: Artur Fyodorov

19 September 2023 4	Krasnodar	1–1 (4–2 p)	Dynamo Moscow	Krasnodar
15:00 MSK (UTC+3)	Pina (yellow card) 61'; Borges 69'; Akhmetov (yellow card) 76'	Report	Carrascal (yellow card) 3'; Bitello 21'; Laxalt (yellow card) 72'; Balbuena (yellow card) 90+5'	Stadium: Krasnodar Stadium; Attendance: 14,455; Referee: Roman Safyan
	Penalties
	Borges (penalty scored); Koksharov (penalty scored); Chernikov (penalty scored); Batxi (penalty missed); Pina (penalty scored)		(penalty missed) Tyukavin; (penalty missed) Smolov; (penalty scored) Ngamaleu; (penalty scored) Balbuena

4 October 2023 5	Krasnodar	3–0	Pari NN	Krasnodar
17:15 MSK (UTC+3)	Akhmetov 33'; Arutyunyan 63'; Córdoba 90+7'	Report	Aleksandrov (yellow card) 22'; Kakkoyev (yellow card) 47'	Stadium: Krasnodar Stadium; Attendance: 11,128; Referee: Vasili Kazartsev

1 November 2023 6	Spartak Moscow	2–3	Krasnodar	Moscow
20:45 MSK (UTC+3)	Sobolev 8' (pen.) (yellow card) 86'; Umyarov 45+1'; Klassen (yellow card) 72'	Report	Koksharov 3', 61' (yellow card) 90+6'; Krivtsov (yellow card) 19'; Denisov 74' (o.g.); Agkatsev (yellow card) 83'; Banjac (yellow card) 90+8'	Stadium: Lukoil Arena; Attendance: 11,280; Referee: Yevgeni Bulanov

==== Knockout stage ====
12 March 2024 Regions path Quarter-finals Stage 1	Khimki	2–0	Krasnodar	Khimki
18:00 MSK (UTC+3)	Khosonov (yellow card) 19' (goal) 25' (pen.); Isayenko 57'; Berkovski (yellow card) 64'; Stepanov (yellow card) 87'	Report	Kady (yellow card) 25'	Stadium: Arena Khimki; Attendance: 1,764; Referee: Kirill Levnikov

== Squad statistics ==
As of match played 25 May 2024

=== Appearances and goals ===
No.	Pos	Nat	Player	Total		Premier League		Russian Cup	
No.	Pos	Nat	Player	Apps	Goals	Apps	Goals	Apps	Goals
1	GK	(Russia) RUS	Stanislav Agkatsev	8	0	0+1	0	7	0
3	DF	(Brazil) BRA	Vítor Tormena	27	0	22+1	0	2+2	0
4	DF	(Paraguay) PAR	Júnior Alonso	35	0	29	0	4+2	0
5	MF	(Colombia) COL	Kevin Castaño	10	0	6+3	0	1	0
6	MF	(Cape Verde) CPV	Kevin Pina	20	1	3+12	1	5	0
7	FW	(Brazil) BRA	Victor Sá	13	1	9+3	1	0+1	0
9	FW	(Colombia) COL	Jhon Córdoba	32	18	27	15	1+4	3
10	MF	(Armenia) ARM	Eduard Spertsyan	33	11	28+1	11	3+1	0
11	FW	(Angola) ANG	João Batxi	34	1	24+5	1	1+4	0
14	MF	(Serbia) SRB	Mihajlo Banjac	25	0	1+17	0	7	0
15	DF	(Uruguay) URU	Lucas Olaza	29	1	21+4	1	2+2	0
20	MF	(Brazil) BRA	Kady Borges	33	3	15+11	1	2+5	2
23	DF	(Russia) RUS	Aleksandr Ektov	18	0	0+12	0	6	0
31	DF	(Brazil) BRA	Kaio Pantaleão	14	1	10+2	1	2	0
33	DF	(Armenia) ARM	Georgy Arutyunyan	10	1	2+2	0	6	1
39	GK	(Russia) RUS	Matvei Safonov	30	0	30	0	0	0
40	FW	(Nigeria) NGA	Olakunle Olusegun	31	3	18+9	3	3+1	0
53	MF	(Russia) RUS	Aleksandr Chernikov	34	1	27	1	1+6	0
82	DF	(Russia) RUS	Sergei Volkov	29	0	20+2	0	3+4	0
88	MF	(Russia) RUS	Nikita Krivtsov	35	3	21+9	2	2+3	1
90	FW	(Nigeria) NGA	Moses Cobnan	16	2	2+8	1	6	1
96	FW	(Russia) RUS	Alexander Koksharov	9	2	1+5	0	3	2
98	DF	(Russia) RUS	Sergei Petrov	17	0	9+5	0	3	0
Players away from the club on loan:
93	FW	(Russia) RUS	Magomed-Shapi Suleymanov	2	0	0+1	0	1	0
Players who appeared for Krasnodar but left during the season:
7	MF	(Russia) RUS	Ilzat Akhmetov	21	3	5+10	2	6	1

=== Goal scorers ===
Place	Position	Nation	Number	Name	Premier League	Russian Cup	Total
1	FW	(Colombia)	9	Jhon Córdoba	15	3	18
2	MF	(Armenia)	10	Eduard Spertsyan	11	0	11
3				Own goal	4	1	5
4	FW	(Nigeria)	40	Olakunle Olusegun	3	0	3
4	MF	(Russia)	7	Ilzat Akhmetov	2	1	3
4	MF	(Russia)	88	Nikita Krivtsov	2	1	3
4	MF	(Brazil)	20	Kady Borges	1	2	3
8	FW	(Nigeria)	90	Moses Cobnan	1	1	2
8	FW	(Russia)	96	Alexander Koksharov	0	2	2
10	MF	(Russia)	53	Aleksandr Chernikov	1	0	1
10	FW	(Angola)	11	João Batxi	1	0	1
10	DF	(Brazil)	31	Kaio Pantaleão	1	0	1
10	MF	(Cape Verde)	6	Kevin Pina	1	0	1
10	DF	(Uruguay)	15	Lucas Olaza	1	0	1
10	FW	(Brazil)	7	Victor Sá	1	0	1
10	DF	(Russia)	33	Georgy Arutyunyan	0	1	1
Total					45	12	57

=== Clean sheets ===
Place	Position	Nation	Number	Name	Premier League	Russian Cup	Total
1	GK	(Russia)	39	Matvei Safonov	11	0	11
2	GK	(Russia)	1	Stanislav Agkatsev	0	2	2
Total					11	2	13

=== Disciplinary record ===
Number	Nation	Position	Name	Premier League		Russian Cup		Total	
Number	Nation	Position	Name	Booked	Sent off (straight red)	Booked	Sent off (straight red)	Booked	Sent off (straight red)
1	(Russia)	GK	Stanislav Agkatsev	0	0	2	0	2	0
3	(Brazil)	DF	Vítor Tormena	3	1	0	0	3	1
4	(Paraguay)	DF	Júnior Alonso	4	0	0	0	4	0
6	(Cape Verde)	MF	Kevin Pina	1	0	1	0	2	0
7	(Brazil)	FW	Victor Sá	1	0	0	0	1	0
9	(Colombia)	FW	Jhon Córdoba	3	1	1	0	4	1
10	(Armenia)	MF	Eduard Spertsyan	6	0	0	1	6	1
11	(Angola)	FW	João Batxi	6	0	0	0	6	0
14	(Serbia)	MF	Mihajlo Banjac	1	0	2	0	3	0
15	(Uruguay)	DF	Lucas Olaza	5	0	0	0	5	0
20	(Brazil)	MF	Kady Borges	5	0	1	0	6	0
23	(Russia)	DF	Aleksandr Ektov	1	0	0	0	1	0
31	(Brazil)	DF	Kaio Pantaleão	4	0	0	0	4	0
33	(Armenia)	DF	Georgy Arutyunyan	0	0	1	0	1	0
40	(Nigeria)	FW	Olakunle Olusegun	6	1	0	0	6	1
53	(Russia)	MF	Aleksandr Chernikov	13	0	0	0	13	0
82	(Russia)	DF	Sergei Volkov	3	1	0	0	3	1
88	(Russia)	MF	Nikita Krivtsov	4	0	1	0	5	0
96	(Russia)	FW	Aleksandr Koksharov	0	0	1	0	1	0
Players away on loan:
Players who left Krasnodar during the season:
7	(Russia)	MF	Ilzat Akhmetov	3	0	1	0	4	0
Total				69	4	11	1	80	5
