= List of Russian football transfers summer 2023 =

This is a list of Russian football transfers in the 2023 summer transfer window by club. Only clubs of the 2023–24 Russian Premier League are included.

== Russian Premier League 2023–24 ==
=== Akhmat Grozny ===
In: Note: Flags indicate national team as defined under FIFA eligibility rules; some limited exceptions apply. Players may hold more than one non-FIFA nationality.

No.	Pos.	Nation	Player
3	DF	RUS	Vladislav Volkov (from Chayka Peschanokopskoye)
6	DF	BIH	Jasmin Čeliković (on loan from (Bosnia and Herzegovina) Tuzla City)
11	MF	BRA	Daniel Júnior (on loan from (Brazil) Cruzeiro)
16	MF	BRA	Camilo (from (France) Lyon)
22	FW	RUS	Akhmed Khazhmuradov
39	MF	RUS	Dzhabrail Taramov
43	DF	RUS	Magomed-Emi Saraliyev
45	MF	RUS	Vladislav Bobritsky
56	DF	RUS	Kirill Gaydamaka
61	FW	RUS	Bulat Vatsuyev
67	DF	RUS	Deni Aslanbekov
72	GK	RUS	Yakhya Magomedov
83	MF	RUS	Adam Bibulatov
91	DF	RUS	Zaur Baysurkayev
93	DF	RUS	Iznaur Tashayev
97	GK	RUS	Islam Chigayev
98	MF	BUL	Svetoslav Kovachev (on loan from (Bulgaria) Arda Kardzhali)

Out: Note: Flags indicate national team as defined under FIFA eligibility rules; some limited exceptions apply. Players may hold more than one non-FIFA nationality.

No.	Pos.	Nation	Player
5	DF	BIH	Miloš Šatara (removed from squad)
17	FW	RUS	Vladislav Karapuzov (end of loan from Dynamo Moscow)
20	DF	CRO	Zoran Nižić
22	DF	RUS	Andemir Goguzokov (to Spartak Nalchik)
24	MF	MNE	Zaim Divanović (removed from squad)
25	MF	RUS	Aleksandr Troshechkin (to Pari Nizhny Novgorod)
41	MF	RUS	Turpal-Ali Arsaliyev
67	FW	RUS	Magomed Artsuyev
79	DF	RUS	Turpal-Ali Ibishev (on loan to Druzhba Maykop)
90	FW	RUS	Islam Alsultanov (on loan to Volga Ulyanovsk)
93	MF	RUS	Alvi Adilkhanov
97	GK	RUS	Magomed-Deni Tsutsulayev (on loan to Chayka Peschanokopskoye)
99	FW	BLR	Ilya Chernyak (end of loan from (Belarus) Shakhtyor Soligorsk)
—	DF	RUS	Nikita Karmayev (to Chayka Peschanokopskoye, previously on loan to Rotor Volgograd)
—	MF	RUS	Amir Aduyev
—	FW	ROU	Gabriel Iancu (to (Romania) Hermannstadt, previously on loan)
—	FW	RUS	Idris Umayev (released, previously on loan to (Kazakhstan) Aktobe)

=== Baltika Kaliningrad ===
In: Note: Flags indicate national team as defined under FIFA eligibility rules; some limited exceptions apply. Players may hold more than one non-FIFA nationality.

No.	Pos.	Nation	Player
2	DF	RUS	Aleksandr Zhirov (from (Germany) SV Sandhausen)
4	DF	FRA	Nathan Gassama (from (Bulgaria) Slavia Sofia)
7	DF	BOL	Roberto Fernández (on loan from (Bolivia) Bolívar)
13	DF	CHI	Guillermo Soto (from (Argentina) Huracán)
17	MF	CRO	Kristijan Bistrović (on loan from CSKA Moscow)
18	FW	CHI	Ángelo Henríquez (from (Poland) Miedź Legnica)
19	MF	RUS	Sergei Pryakhin (from CSKA Moscow, previously on loan)
20	MF	ARM	Artur Galoyan (from Alania Vladikavkaz)
27	DF	ARM	Sergey Kochkanyan (from Dynamo Stavropol)
35	GK	RUS	Soslan Dzhanayev (from Sochi)
42	MF	RUS	Vladislav Pospelov (from Almaz-Antey St. Petersburg)
45	FW	RUS	Nikita Luzan (from Zenit St. Petersburg)
47	MF	RUS	Ibragim Umarov (from Baltika-BFU Kaliningrad)
53	MF	RUS	Kirill Nikolayev (from Zenit St. Petersburg academy)
58	MF	RUS	Muslim Gamidov (from Dynamo St. Petersburg)
59	MF	RUS	Tigran Avanesyan (from CSKA Moscow, previously on loan)
62	DF	RUS	Aleksandr Zyurin (from Almaz-Antey St. Petersburg)
64	DF	RUS	Osman Gasanbekov
66	MF	POR	João Lameira (from (Portugal) Torreense)
71	MF	RUS	Alan Gioyev (from Baltika-BFU Kaliningrad)
73	MF	RUS	Ignat Dmitriyev (from Lokomotiv Moscow academy)
75	MF	RUS	Artyom Babchuk (from Lokomotiv Moscow academy)
93	MF	RUS	Dmitry Chameyev (from Almaz-Antey St. Petersburg)
94	GK	RUS	Vladimir Malyshev (from Yadro St. Petersburg)
98	GK	RUS	Ivan Gavrilov (from Almaz-Antey St. Petersburg)
99	MF	RUS	Makhach Abdulkhamidov (from Baltika-BFU Kaliningrad)

Out: Note: Flags indicate national team as defined under FIFA eligibility rules; some limited exceptions apply. Players may hold more than one non-FIFA nationality.

No.	Pos.	Nation	Player
4	MF	RUS	Danil Klyonkin (to Volgar Astrakhan)
7	MF	RUS	Kirill Folmer (end of loan from Rostov)
11	FW	RUS	Dmitry Barkov (to Arsenal Tula)
14	FW	RUS	Gocha Gogrichiani (on loan to Volgar Astrakhan)
17	DF	RUS	Eduard Valiakhmetov (to Shinnik Yaroslavl)
18	MF	MNE	Mladen Kašćelan (retired)
34	DF	RUS	Maksim Khramtsov (to Dynamo Makhachkala)
44	DF	RUS	Maksim Tishkin (retired)
90	FW	RUS	Grigory Borisenko (to KAMAZ Naberezhnye Chelny)

=== CSKA Moscow ===
In: Note: Flags indicate national team as defined under FIFA eligibility rules; some limited exceptions apply. Players may hold more than one non-FIFA nationality.

No.	Pos.	Nation	Player
2	DF	BRA	Khellven (from (Brazil) Paranaense)
7	MF	CHI	Víctor Dávila (from (Mexico) León)
21	FW	UZB	Abbosbek Fayzullaev (from (Uzbekistan) Pakhtakor Tashkent)
27	DF	BRA	Moisés (from (Brazil) Internacional, previously on loan)
47	FW	RUS	Renat Golybin (from own academy)
56	FW	RUS	Maksim Sidelnikov (from own academy)
59	MF	RUS	Danila Prokopyev (from own academy)
68	DF	RUS	Mikhail Ryadno (from own academy)
82	FW	RUS	Luka Zgursky (from own academy)
85	GK	RUS	Yegor Besayev (from own academy)
89	MF	RUS	Vadim Churilov (from own academy)
99	GK	RUS	Nikolay Barovsky (from own academy)

Out: Note: Flags indicate national team as defined under FIFA eligibility rules; some limited exceptions apply. Players may hold more than one non-FIFA nationality.

No.	Pos.	Nation	Player
8	MF	COL	Jorge Carrascal (to Dynamo Moscow)
19	MF	KAZ	Bakhtiyar Zaynutdinov (to (Turkey) Beşiktaş)
28	MF	PAR	Jesús Medina (to Spartak Moscow)
38	FW	ARG	Adolfo Gaich (on loan to (Turkey) Çaykur Rizespor, previously on loan to (Italy) Hellas Verona)
41	FW	RUS	Yegor Ushakov (on loan to Krylia Sovetov Samara)
42	MF	RUS	Georgi Shchennikov
44	DF	RUS	Yegor Noskov (on loan to Volga Ulyanovsk)
46	FW	RUS	Vladislav Yakovlev (on loan to Khimki, previously on loan to Pari NN)
60	FW	RUS	Daniil Gurchenko
62	DF	RUS	Vadim Karpov (on loan to Ufa)
67	DF	RUS	Ilya Kazakov (to Zvezda St. Petersburg)
73	FW	RUS	Yegor Shevelev (to Torpedo-2)
79	MF	RUS	Ruslan Ozdoyev (to Rubin-2 Kazan)
93	FW	RUS	Stanislav Lapinsky (to Zenit St. Petersburg)
95	GK	RUS	Vadim Tsvetkov
96	MF	RUS	Aleksey Slivin (to Saturn Ramenskoye)
97	FW	RUS	Yaroslav Dol (on loan to Dynamo Bryansk)
—	GK	RUS	Danila Bokov (on loan to Chayka Peschanokopskoye, previously on loan to Salyut Belgorod)
—	DF	RUS	Vadim Konyukhov (on loan to Akron Tolyatti, previously on loan to Ufa)
—	DF	RUS	Andrei Savinov (on loan to SKA-Khabarovsk, previously on loan to Shinnik Yaroslavl)
—	MF	RUS	Tigran Avanesyan (to Baltika Kaliningrad, previously on loan)
—	MF	CRO	Kristijan Bistrović (on loan to Baltika Kaliningrad, previously on loan to (Netherlands) Fortuna Sittard)
—	MF	RUS	Sergei Pryakhin (to Baltika Kaliningrad, previously on loan)
—	MF	ISL	Arnór Sigurðsson (on loan to (England) Blackburn Rovers, previously on loan to (Sweden) IFK Norrköping)
—	FW	NGR	Chidera Ejuke (on loan to (Belgium) Royal Antwerp, previously on loan to (Germany) Hertha BSC)
—	FW	MLI	Lassana N'Diaye (to (Serbia) Radnički Niš, previously on loan to (Bulgaria) Arda Kardzhali)
—	FW	BLR	Ilya Shkurin (on loan to (Poland) Stal Mielec, previously on loan to (Israel) Maccabi Petah Tikva)

=== Dynamo Moscow ===
In: Note: Flags indicate national team as defined under FIFA eligibility rules; some limited exceptions apply. Players may hold more than one non-FIFA nationality.

No.	Pos.	Nation	Player
3	DF	PAR	Fabián Balbuena (end of loan to (Brazil) Corinthians)
8	MF	COL	Jorge Carrascal (from CSKA Moscow)
22	MF	RUS	Igor Shkolik (end of loan to Neftekhimik Nizhnekamsk)
24	MF	MEX	Luis Chávez (from (Mexico) Pachuca)
26	DF	RUS	Artyom Beskibalny (on loan from Khimki)
28	DF	RUS	Kirill Isayev (from own academy)
29	GK	RUS	Stepan Dyogtev (from own academy)
33	FW	RUS	Gleb Knyazev (from own academy)
40	GK	RUS	Kurban Rasulov (from own academy)
46	MF	RUS	Dmitry Yerofeyev (from own academy)
53	FW	RUS	Mikhail Gulyayev (from own academy)
67	DF	RUS	Daniil Cherkasov (from own academy)
68	DF	RUS	Georgy Tikhomirov (from own academy)
72	FW	RUS	Andrey Mazurin (end of loan to Alania Vladikavkaz)
75	MF	RUS	Maksim Mayorov
87	MF	RUS	Ruslan Kukushbayev (from own academy)
89	MF	BRA	Bitello (from (Brazil) Grêmio)
88	MF	RUS	Viktor Okishor (from own academy)
94	FW	RUS	Artyom Krylovsky (from own academy)
96	FW	RUS	Yegor Akimov (from own academy)
97	DF	RUS	Nikita Morozov (from own academy)
99	FW	RUS	Mikhail Kozin (from own academy)

Out: Note: Flags indicate national team as defined under FIFA eligibility rules; some limited exceptions apply. Players may hold more than one non-FIFA nationality.

No.	Pos.	Nation	Player
15	DF	GEO	Saba Sazonov (to (Italy) Torino)
17	MF	NOR	Mathias Normann (end of loan from Rostov)
23	FW	RUS	Vladislav Karapuzov (on loan to Pari Nizhny Novgorod, previously on loan to Akhmat Grozny)
43	DF	RUS	Denis Osokin (to Dynamo Makhachkala)
47	MF	RUS	Arsen Zakharyan (to (Spain) Real Sociedad)
49	FW	CMR	Olivier Kenfack (to Kuban Krasnodar)
72	MF	RUS	Roman Yermolin (to Tekstilshchik Ivanovo)
78	MF	RUS	Georgy Sulakvelidze (on loan to (Georgia (country)) Samgurali Tsqaltubo)
82	DF	RUS	Vadim Roldugin (to Rodina-M Moscow)
90	MF	RUS	Vladislav Galkin (on loan to Akron Tolyatti)
95	DF	RUS	Dmitry Begun (to SKA-Khabarovsk)
—	GK	BLR	Andrey Kudravets (on loan to (Belarus) BATE Borisov, previously from BATE)
—	DF	URU	Guillermo Varela (to (Brazil) Flamengo, previously on loan)
—	MF	CRO	Nikola Moro (to (Italy) Bologna, previously on loan)
—	MF	RUS	Vladimir Moskvichyov (to Torpedo Moscow, previously on loan to Neftekhimik Nizhnekamsk)
—	MF	POL	Sebastian Szymański (to (Turkey) Fenerbahçe, previously on loan to (Netherlands) Feyenoord)
—	FW	RUS	Maksim Danilin (to Torpedo Moscow, previously on loan)

=== Fakel Voronezh ===
In: Note: Flags indicate national team as defined under FIFA eligibility rules; some limited exceptions apply. Players may hold more than one non-FIFA nationality.

No.	Pos.	Nation	Player
1	GK	RUS	Vitali Gudiyev (from Khimki)
5	MF	RSA	Thabo Cele (from (Poland) Radomiak Radom)
7	FW	RUS	Aleksandr Dolgov (from Khimki)
8	MF	RUS	Abdula Bagamayev (from Lokomotiv Moscow)
11	MF	MDA	Nichita Moțpan (from (Moldova) Bălți)
17	DF	CRO	Antonio Jakoliš (from (Romania) Argeș Pitești)
23	MF	RUS	Vyacheslav Yakimov (from Krasnodar, previously on loan)
30	DF	RUS	Fyodor Kudryashov (from (Turkey) Antalyaspor)
31	GK	RUS	Aleksandr Belenov (from Rubin Kazan)
62	GK	RUS	Vladislav Kalinichev (from own academy)
71	DF	RUS	Nikolai Poyarkov (on loan from Rostov)
96	MF	RUS	Kirill Simonov (from Dynamo Moscow academy)

Out: Note: Flags indicate national team as defined under FIFA eligibility rules; some limited exceptions apply. Players may hold more than one non-FIFA nationality.

No.	Pos.	Nation	Player
1	GK	RUS	Ilya Svinov (end of loan from Spartak Moscow)
6	MF	RUS	Denis Shepilov (removed from squad)
7	MF	RUS	Roman Akbashev (to Rostov)
17	FW	FRA	Mohamed Brahimi (end of loan from (Bulgaria) Botev Plovdiv)
21	FW	RUS	Georgi Gongadze (to Torpedo Moscow)
22	MF	FRA	Réda Rabeï (end of loan from (Bulgaria) Botev Plovdiv)
25	DF	RUS	Mikhail Smirnov (retired)
78	MF	RUS	Daniil Chernyakov (on loan to Metallurg Lipetsk)
85	DF	RUS	Yevgeny Morozov (end of loan from Lokomotiv Moscow)
93	GK	RUS	Aleksei Gorodovoy (to Rodina Moscow)
—	MF	RUS	Valeri Tsarukyan (to Alania Vladikavkaz, previously on loan to Volgar Astrakhan)

=== Krasnodar ===
In: Note: Flags indicate national team as defined under FIFA eligibility rules; some limited exceptions apply. Players may hold more than one non-FIFA nationality.

No.	Pos.	Nation	Player
3	DF	BRA	Vítor Tormena (from (Portugal) Braga)
15	DF	URU	Lucas Olaza (from (Spain) Real Valladolid)
23	DF	RUS	Aleksandr Ektov (from Orenburg)
29	DF	RUS	Vitali Shakhov (from Spartak Kostroma)
36	FW	RUS	Kamil Mullin (from Rubin Kazan)
37	GK	RUS	Aleksey Ploshchadny (from own academy)
47	FW	RUS	Atsamaz Revazov (from own academy)
48	FW	RUS	Yuri Zheleznov (on loan from Ural Yekaterinburg)
50	MF	RUS	Grigory Lovtsov (from own academy)
51	GK	RUS	Vyacheslav Shatayev (from own academy)
55	FW	RUS	Andrey Domotsev (from own academy)
58	GK	RUS	Danil Ladokha (from own academy)
60	MF	RUS	Denis Bogomolov (from own academy)
65	FW	RUS	Emil Kishiyev (from own academy)
68	FW	RUS	Nikita Kotylevsky (from own academy)
69	FW	RUS	Aleksandr Yegurnev (from Kaluga)
74	MF	RUS	Devid Mudrak (from own academy)
75	MF	RUS	Eduard Bagrintsev (from (Slovakia) Dubnica)
79	DF	RUS	Bogdan Matsola (from own academy)
81	DF	RUS	Nikita Semenenko (from own academy)
89	FW	RUS	Konstantin Dorofeyev (from own academy)
92	FW	RUS	Stepan Laskin (from own academy)
93	FW	RUS	Magomed-Shapi Suleymanov (end of loan to (Israel) Hapoel Be'er Sheva)
99	MF	RUS	Sergei Sharov (from Spartak Kostroma)

Out: Note: Flags indicate national team as defined under FIFA eligibility rules; some limited exceptions apply. Players may hold more than one non-FIFA nationality.

No.	Pos.	Nation	Player
6	DF	ECU	Cristian Ramírez (to (Hungary) Ferencváros)
11	FW	RUS	Aleksei Ionov (to Rostov)
26	MF	RUS	Dmitri Kratkov
30	GK	RUS	Valentin Grishin
32	DF	RUS	Dmitri Pivovarov (on loan to Chayka Peschanokopskoye)
36	FW	RUS	Mikhail Bersnev (to Astrakhan)
38	MF	RUS	David Kokoyev (on loan to Neftekhimik Nizhnekamsk)
41	DF	RUS	Mikhail Sukhoruchenko (on loan to Alania Vladikavkaz)
45	MF	RUS	Oleg Oznobikhin (to Ufa)
48	DF	RUS	Oleg Isayenko (to Khimki)
49	DF	RUS	Ivan Dmitriyev
55	DF	RUS	Bogdan Logachyov (to Astrakhan)
58	DF	RUS	Sergey Novikov
61	MF	NGR	Ifeanyi David Nduka (on loan to Arsenal Tula)
62	MF	RUS	Rustam Berzegov (to Rodina-2 Moscow)
64	MF	RUS	Roman Zashchepkin (to KAMAZ Naberezhnye Chelny)
67	FW	RUS	Maksim Kutovoy (to SKA-Khabarovsk)
70	FW	RUS	Vladislav Samko (to Rodina Moscow)
72	FW	RUS	Rustam Khalnazarov (on loan to Arsenal Tula)
79	FW	RUS	Omar Popov (to Rodina-2 Moscow)
80	DF	RUS	Yegor Sorokin (to Rubin Kazan)
84	DF	RUS	Vyacheslav Litvinov (to Sochi)
85	FW	NGR	Jonathan Okoronkwo (on loan to Arsenal Tula)
93	FW	RUS	Magomed-Shapi Suleymanov (on loan to (Greece) Aris Thessaloniki)
97	GK	RUS	Nikita Kokarev (to Arsenal Tula)
99	FW	RUS	Danil Polyakh (to Biolog-Novokubansk)
—	DF	RUS	Ruslan Apekov (to Akron Tolyatti, previously on loan)
—	DF	RUS	Sergei Borodin (to Torpedo Moscow, previously on loan to (Israel) Beitar Jerusalem)
—	DF	RUS	Yevgeni Chernov (to Rostov, previously on loan)
—	MF	POL	Grzegorz Krychowiak (to (Saudi Arabia) Abha, previously on loan to (Saudi Arabia) Al Shabab)
—	MF	RUS	Aleks Matsukatov (to Arsenal Tula, previously on loan to Akron Tolyatti)
—	MF	RUS	Vyacheslav Yakimov (to Fakel Voronezh, previously on loan)
—	FW	RUS	Irakly Manelov (to Torpedo Moscow, previously on loan to Arsenal Tula)

=== Krylia Sovetov Samara ===
In: Note: Flags indicate national team as defined under FIFA eligibility rules; some limited exceptions apply. Players may hold more than one non-FIFA nationality.

No.	Pos.	Nation	Player
6	MF	RUS	Sergei Babkin (from Lokomotiv Moscow, previously on loan)
9	FW	RUS	Vladimir Khubulov (end of loan to Khimki)
14	FW	RUS	Nikita Saltykov (end of loan to Akron Tolyatti)
17	FW	BLR	Yegor Karpitsky (from (Belarus) Shakhtyor Soligorsk)
30	MF	RUS	Artyom Sokolov (end of loan to Pari Nizhny Novgorod)
33	DF	RUS	Aleksey Lysov (from Lokomotiv Moscow)
41	FW	RUS	Yegor Ushakov (on loan from CSKA Moscow)
44	DF	CRO	Mateo Barać (end of loan to (Belgium) Oostende)
63	FW	RUS	Aleksey Mutovkin (from own academy)
69	MF	RUS	Andrey Tsorn (from own academy)
71	GK	RUS	Mikhail Nedospasov (from own academy)
82	MF	RUS	Kirill Popov (from own academy)

Out: Note: Flags indicate national team as defined under FIFA eligibility rules; some limited exceptions apply. Players may hold more than one non-FIFA nationality.

No.	Pos.	Nation	Player
14	MF	RUS	Aleksandr Kovalenko (end of loan from Sochi)
16	GK	RUS	Daniil Veselov (on loan to Chelyabinsk)
19	FW	RUS	Nikita Khlusov (on loan to (Belarus) Dnepr Mogilev)
29	FW	KAZ	Aleksandr Zuyev (to (Serbia) IMT)
30	FW	SRB	Aleksandar Ćirković (on loan to (Serbia) TSC)
96	FW	RUS	Yegor Totsky (to Sochi)
—	GK	RUS	Danil Beltyukov (to Dynamo Vladivostok, previously on loan to Zenit-Izhevsk)
—	MF	RUS	Leonid Gerchikov (on loan to Chelyabinsk, previously on loan to Veles Moscow)
—	DF	RUS	Yan Gudkov (on loan to Sokol Saratov, previously on loan to Tekstilshchik Ivanovo)
—	DF	RUS	Aleksei Nikitenkov (on loan to Chelyabinsk, previously on loan to Veles Moscow)
—	DF	BLR	Dmitry Prishchepa (to Rotor Volgograd, previously on loan)
—	MF	RUS	Danil Lipovoy (on loan to Neftekhimik Nizhnekamsk, previously on loan to Volgar Astrakhan)
—	MF	RUS	Nikita Pershin (on loan to Chelyabinsk, previously on loan to Zvezda St. Petersburg)
—	MF	RUS	Vladislav Tyurin (to Novosibirsk, previously on loan to Tyumen)
—	MF	RUS	Dmitri Velikorodny (on loan to Chelyabinsk, previously on loan to Novosibirsk)
—	FW	RUS	Yegor Pankov (to Chertanovo Moscow, previously on loan to Zvezda St. Petersburg)

=== Lokomotiv Moscow ===
In: Note: Flags indicate national team as defined under FIFA eligibility rules; some limited exceptions apply. Players may hold more than one non-FIFA nationality.

No.	Pos.	Nation	Player
8	FW	RUS	Vladislav Sarveli (from Sochi)
45	DF	RUS	Aleksandr Silyanov (end of loan to Rostov)
52	GK	RUS	Roland Dzhobava (from own academy)
62	DF	RUS	Denis Traygel (from own academy)
67	MF	RUS	Vladislav Mamonov (from own academy)
74	MF	RUS	Daniil Chevardin (from own academy)
77	DF	RUS	Ilya Samoshnikov (from Rubin Kazan)
79	MF	RUS	Vadim Arutyunyan (from own academy)
80	DF	RUS	Kirill Volkov (from own academy)
85	DF	RUS	Yevgeny Morozov (end of loan to Fakel Voronezh)
86	DF	RUS	Ilya Zolkin (from own academy)
87	FW	RUS	Artyom Korneyev (from own academy)
92	DF	RUS	Timofey Shchelkunov (from own academy)
94	MF	RUS	Dmitri Rybchinsky (end of loan to Pari Nizhny Novgorod)
96	MF	RUS	Ivan Anisimov (from own academy)
99	FW	RUS	Timur Suleymanov (on loan from Pari Nizhny Novgorod)

Out: Note: Flags indicate national team as defined under FIFA eligibility rules; some limited exceptions apply. Players may hold more than one non-FIFA nationality.

No.	Pos.	Nation	Player
2	DF	RUS	Dmitri Zhivoglyadov (to Pari Nizhny Novgorod)
8	DF	RUS	Igor Smolnikov (retired)
9	FW	RUS	Ivan Ignatyev (to Sochi)
10	FW	FRA	Wilson Isidor (on loan to Zenit St. Petersburg)
25	FW	GUI	François Kamano (to (Saudi Arabia) Abha)
30	DF	ARG	Germán Conti (on loan to (Argentina) Colón)
32	DF	RUS	Artemy Kosogorov (to Zenit-2 St. Petersburg)
56	GK	RUS	Denis Uralyov
60	GK	RUS	Andrey Savin (to Tyumen)
62	FW	RUS	Roman Kolmakov (on loan to Zenit-2 St. Petersburg)
63	FW	RUS	Aleksandr Morozov (to own Under-17 squad)
65	GK	RUS	Aleksandr Kasyanenko
66	DF	RUS	Mikhail Ivankov
70	DF	RUS	Maksim Shnaptsev (to Pari Nizhny Novgorod)
72	FW	RUS	Aleksey Larin (to Khimki)
80	FW	RUS	Timur Kasimov (to Khimki)
84	DF	RUS	Aleksey Lysov (to Krylia Sovetov Samara)
92	MF	RUS	Abdula Bagamayev (to Fakel Voronezh)
95	MF	RUS	Ilya Belikov (to Zorkiy Krasnogorsk)
97	MF	RUS	Anton Gorbunov (to Dynamo Stavropol)
—	DF	CRO	Tin Jedvaj (on loan to (Greece) Panathinaikos, previously on loan to (United Arab Emirates) Al Ain)
—	DF	UKR	Mark Mampassi (on loan to (Belgium) Kortrijk, previously on loan to (Turkey) Antalyaspor)
—	MF	RUS	Sergei Babkin (to Krylia Sovetov Samara, previously on loan)
—	MF	RUS	Ilya Berkovski (on loan to Khimki, previously on loan to Pari Nizhny Novgorod)
—	MF	RUS	Nikita Khlynov (released, previously on loan to Znamya Noginsk)
—	MF	RUS	Maksim Petrov (to Neftekhimik Nizhnekamsk, previously on loan to Alania Vladikavkaz)
—	FW	CZE	Jan Kuchta (to (Czech Republic) Sparta Prague, previously on loan)
—	FW	RUS	Andrey Nikitin (on loan to SKA-Khabarovsk, previously on loan to Ufa)
—	FW	BRA	Pedrinho (on loan to (Brazil) América Mineiro, previously on loan to (Brazil) São Paulo)
—	FW	MNE	Marko Rakonjac (on loan to (Serbia) TSC, previously loan to (Serbia) Red Star Belgrade)

=== Orenburg ===
In: Note: Flags indicate national team as defined under FIFA eligibility rules; some limited exceptions apply. Players may hold more than one non-FIFA nationality.

No.	Pos.	Nation	Player
5	DF	RUS	Leo Goglichidze (on loan from Ural Yekaterinburg)
6	DF	RUS	Arsen Adamov (on loan from Zenit St. Petersburg)
7	FW	TUR	Emircan Gürlük (from (Turkey) Altınordu)
9	FW	ARG	Braian Mansilla (from (Argentina) Racing, previously on loan)
11	FW	RUS	Stepan Oganesyan (from Spartak Moscow, previously on loan)
14	MF	RUS	Yaroslav Mikhaylov (on loan from Zenit St. Petersburg)
19	FW	ECU	Justin Cuero (on loan from (Ecuador) Independiente del Valle)
24	MF	ARG	Tomás Muro (from (Argentina) Gimnasia y Esgrima)
69	FW	RUS	Semyon Yurin (end of loan to Forte Taganrog)
81	DF	RUS	Maksim Sidorov (from Kuban Krasnodar)

Out: Note: Flags indicate national team as defined under FIFA eligibility rules; some limited exceptions apply. Players may hold more than one non-FIFA nationality.

No.	Pos.	Nation	Player
1	GK	RUS	Yevgeni Goshev (to Dynamo Makhachkala)
5	MF	RUS	Timur Ayupov (to Ural Yekaterinburg)
11	DF	BUL	Mateo Stamatov (to Pari Nizhny Novgorod)
19	DF	RUS	Aleksandr Ektov (to Krasnodar)
20	FW	PAR	Diego Acosta (to (Paraguay) Sportivo Luqueño)
37	MF	RUS	Danil Kapustyansky (on loan to Yenisey Krasnoyarsk)
—	DF	RUS	Timur Nikolayev (to Forte Taganrog, previously on loan)

=== Pari Nizhny Novgorod ===
In: Note: Flags indicate national team as defined under FIFA eligibility rules; some limited exceptions apply. Players may hold more than one non-FIFA nationality.

No.	Pos.	Nation	Player
9	FW	GBS	Zé Turbo (from (Qatar) Al-Markhiya)
10	MF	RUS	Aleksandr Troshechkin (from Akhmat Grozny)
11	DF	BUL	Mateo Stamatov (from Orenburg)
13	MF	RUS	Ilya Kukharchuk (from Torpedo Moscow)
17	FW	UZB	Ruslanbek Jiyanov (end of loan to (Uzbekistan) Olympic Tashkent)
20	FW	URU	Juan Manuel Boselli (from (Portugal) Gil Vicente)
21	MF	NGR	Ededem Essien (from (Libya) Al Akhdar)
23	FW	GEO	Nikoloz Kutateladze (from (France) Rodez)
26	DF	RUS	Dmitry Tikhy
27	DF	RUS	Dmitri Zhivoglyadov (from Lokomotiv Moscow)
34	MF	RUS	Anton Mukhin (from own academy)
51	GK	RUS	Vitali Botnar (from Torpedo Moscow)
65	DF	RUS	Nikolai Tolstopyatov (on loan from Spartak Moscow)
70	DF	RUS	Maksim Shnaptsev (from Lokomotiv Moscow)
77	FW	RUS	Vladislav Karapuzov (on loan from Dynamo Moscow)
81	GK	RUS	Ivan Kukushkin (from Ufa)

Out: Note: Flags indicate national team as defined under FIFA eligibility rules; some limited exceptions apply. Players may hold more than one non-FIFA nationality.

No.	Pos.	Nation	Player
1	GK	RUS	Artur Anisimov (to KAMAZ Naberezhnye Chelny)
3	DF	CMR	Macky Bagnack (end of loan from (Kazakhstan) Kairat)
5	DF	ARG	Lucas Masoero (to (Romania) Universitatea Cluj)
11	MF	RUS	Ilya Berkovski (end of loan from Lokomotiv Moscow)
13	GK	RUS	Nikita Goylo (end of loan from Zenit St. Petersburg)
14	MF	RUS	Yaroslav Mikhaylov (to Zenit St. Petersburg, previously from Zenit, previously on loan)
18	MF	RUS	Artyom Sokolov (end of loan from Krylia Sovetov Samara)
20	FW	RUS	Vladislav Yakovlev (end of loan from CSKA Moscow)
29	MF	RUS	Yegor Gaganin (on loan to Khimik Dzerzhinsk, previously on loan to Rodina-2 Moscow)
37	MF	RUS	Albert Sharipov (to Kuban Krasnodar)
44	DF	RUS	Daniil Kornyushin
57	FW	RUS	Vyacheslav Krotov (on loan to Alania Vladikavkaz)
88	MF	RUS	Denis Glushakov (to Spartak Kostroma)
90	MF	RUS	Konstantin Shiltsov (end of loan from Spartak Moscow)
93	FW	RUS	Timur Suleymanov (on loan to Lokomotiv Moscow)
94	MF	RUS	Dmitri Rybchinsky (end of loan from Lokomotiv Moscow)
99	FW	GUI	Momo Yansané (end of loan from (Moldova) Sheriff Tiraspol)
—	DF	ARM	Artyom Gyurdzhan (on loan to KAMAZ Naberezhnye Chelny, previously from Tekstilshchik Ivanovo)
—	DF	RUS	Danila Vedernikov (on loan to Murom, previously from Rostov)
—	MF	RUS	Kirill Bozhenov (on loan to Khimik Dzerzhinsk, previously from Rostov)
—	MF	RUS	David Kobesov (on loan to Alania Vladikavkaz, previously on loan to Khimki)
—	MF	NOR	Lars Olden Larsen (to (Netherlands) NEC, previously on loan to (Sweden) BK Häcken)
—	MF	RUS	Dmitri Yugaldin (on loan to Sokol Saratov, previously on loan to Irtysh Omsk)
—	FW	RUS	Vladislav Feshchenko (to Dynamo Stavropol, previously on loan to Khimik Dzerzhinsk)
—	FW	ANG	Felício Milson (to (Israel) Maccabi Tel Aviv, previously on loan to (Turkey) Ankaragücü)

=== Rostov ===
In: Note: Flags indicate national team as defined under FIFA eligibility rules; some limited exceptions apply. Players may hold more than one non-FIFA nationality.

No.	Pos.	Nation	Player
7	MF	RUS	Roman Akbashev (from Fakel Voronezh)
9	FW	IRI	Mohammad Mohebi (from (Portugal) Santa Clara)
11	FW	RUS	Aleksei Ionov (from Krasnodar)
17	MF	RUS	Daniil Duryan (from own academy)
28	DF	RUS	Yevgeni Chernov (from Krasnodar, previously on loan)
40	DF	RUS	Ilya Vakhaniya (from Zenit St. Petersburg)
44	DF	RUS	Ilya Kirsh (on loan from Zenit St. Petersburg)
48	MF	RUS	Sergey Mokrousov (from own academy)
51	MF	RUS	Aleksey Koltakov (from own academy)
60	MF	RUS	Kirill Stolbov (on loan from Zenit St. Petersburg)
67	DF	RUS	German Ignatov (from own academy)
68	GK	RUS	Aleksandr Grigoryev (on loan to Tekstilshchik Ivanovo)
93	GK	RUS	Yaroslav Solovyov (from own academy)
95	MF	RUS	Ivan Polumysko (from own academy)
98	DF	RUS	Kirill Ivanov (from own academy)
—	FW	RUS	Danil Khromov (end of loan to Arsenal Tula)

Out: Note: Flags indicate national team as defined under FIFA eligibility rules; some limited exceptions apply. Players may hold more than one non-FIFA nationality.

No.	Pos.	Nation	Player
7	FW	RUS	Dmitry Poloz (to Torpedo Moscow)
26	FW	MKD	David Toshevski
33	MF	RUS	Nikita Kolotiyevsky
34	GK	RUS	Ruslan Murtazov
38	MF	BLR	Aleksandr Selyava (to (Belarus) Dinamo Minsk)
45	DF	RUS	Aleksandr Silyanov (end of loan from Lokomotiv Moscow)
52	FW	RUS	Kirill Cheburakov (to own Under-17 squad)
59	MF	RUS	Denis Sergiyenko (to Mashuk-KMV Pyatigorsk)
61	MF	RUS	Kirill Girnyk (to Chelyabinsk)
68	GK	RUS	Aleksandr Grigoryev (on loan to Tekstilshchik Ivanovo)
71	DF	RUS	Nikolai Poyarkov (on loan to Fakel Voronezh)
77	MF	RUS	Stepan Melnikov (on loan to Alania Vladikavkaz)
79	GK	RUS	Aleksey Ivanov
85	MF	RUS	Murad Alimov (to own Under-17 squad)
86	MF	RUS	Nikita Kashtan (on loan to SKA Rostov-on-Don)
93	GK	RUS	Danil Ryazanov (on loan to Luki-Energiya)
—	GK	RUS	Yegor Baburin (to Torpedo Moscow, previously on loan)
—	GK	RUS	Aleksandr Dyachkov (to Biolog-Novokubansk, previously on loan to Salyut Belgorod, previously on loan to Dynamo Stavropol)
—	DF	BIH	Dennis Hadžikadunić (on loan to (Germany) Hamburger SV, previously on loan to (Spain) Mallorca)
—	DF	RUS	Nikita Kotin (on loan to Shinnik Yaroslavl, previously on loan to Sokol Saratov)
—	DF	RUS	Konstantin Kovalyov (on loan to Saturn Ramenskoye, previously on loan to Avangard Kursk)
—	DF	RUS	Aleksandr Mukhin (on loan to Volgar Astrakhan, previously on loan to Ufa)
—	DF	RUS	Danila Vedernikov (to Pari Nizhny Novgorod, previously on loan to Volgar Astrakhan)
—	MF	RUS	Kirill Bozhenov (to Pari Nizhny Novgorod, previously on loan to Dynamo Makhachkala)
—	MF	RUS	Kirill Folmer (to Volgar Astrakhan, previously on loan to Baltika Kaliningrad)
—	MF	RUS	Pavel Gorelov (to KAMAZ Naberezhnye Chelny, previously on loan to (Armenia) Van)
—	MF	JPN	Kento Hashimoto (to (Spain) Huesca, previously on loan)
—	MF	NOR	Magnus Nordengen Knudsen (on loan to (Denmark) AGF, previously on loan to (Norway) Lillestrøm)
—	MF	RUS	Maksim Martyanov (on loan to Dynamo St. Petersburg, previously on loan to Leningradets Leningrad Oblast)
—	MF	NOR	Mathias Normann (to (Saudi Arabia) Al Raed, previously on loan to Dynamo Moscow)
—	MF	RUS	Danila Sukhomlinov (on loan to Shinnik Yaroslavl)
—	FW	SWE	Pontus Almqvist (on loan to (Italy) Lecce, previously on loan to (Poland) Pogoń Szczecin)
—	FW	RUS	Artyom Ntumba (released, previously on loan to Veles Moscow)
—	FW	RUS	Aleksandr Saplinov (to Spartak Kostroma, previously on loan to Rubin Kazan)
—	FW	RUS	Maksim Turishchev (on loan to Rodina Moscow, previously on loan to Torpedo Moscow)

=== Rubin Kazan ===
In: Note: Flags indicate national team as defined under FIFA eligibility rules; some limited exceptions apply. Players may hold more than one non-FIFA nationality.

No.	Pos.	Nation	Player
6	MF	ARM	Ugochukwu Iwu (from (Armenia) Urartu)
7	MF	SRB	Lazar Ranđelović (from (Greece) Olympiacos)
15	DF	MNE	Igor Vujačić (from (Serbia) Partizan)
24	MF	SRB	Nikola Čumić (from (Serbia) Vojvodina)
25	MF	RUS	Igor Konovalov (end of loan to Ural Yekaterinburg)
26	DF	SRB	Uroš Drezgić (from (Serbia) Čukarički)
30	MF	ARG	Valentín Vada (from (Spain) Zaragoza)
31	DF	POL	Maciej Rybus (from Spartak Moscow)
44	FW	KOS	Mirlind Daku (from (Croatia) Osijek)
50	GK	RUS	Yegor Shamov (from Arsenal Tula)
80	DF	RUS	Yegor Sorokin (from Krasnodar)
99	GK	RUS	Artyom Ismagilov (end of loan to Zenit-Izhevsk)

Out: Note: Flags indicate national team as defined under FIFA eligibility rules; some limited exceptions apply. Players may hold more than one non-FIFA nationality.

No.	Pos.	Nation	Player
3	DF	RUS	Elmir Nabiullin
6	MF	RUS	Alan Dzagoev
7	FW	RUS	Soltmurad Bakayev (on loan to Rodina Moscow)
8	FW	RUS	Artyom Popov (to Arsenal Tula)
11	MF	RUS	Igor Gorbunov (to Torpedo Moscow)
14	FW	RUS	Mikhail Kostyukov (on loan to Dynamo Makhachkala)
31	GK	RUS	Aleksandr Belenov (to Fakel Voronezh)
45	FW	BUL	Dimitar Mitkov (end of loan from (Bulgaria) Lokomotiv Sofia)
56	FW	RUS	Lenar Fattakhov (on loan to Kuban Krasnodar)
77	DF	RUS	Ilya Samoshnikov (to Lokomotiv Moscow)
97	DF	RUS	Konstantin Nizhegorodov (on loan to Arsenal Tula)
—	DF	IRQ	Ali Adnan (to (Iran) Mes Rafsanjan)
—	DF	RUS	Ivan Savitskiy (on loan to Rodina Moscow, previously on loan to Yenisey Krasnoyarsk)
—	MF	DEN	Oliver Abildgaard (to (Italy) Como, previously on loan to (Italy) Hellas Verona)
—	MF	RUS	Daniil Rodin (on loan to KAMAZ Naberezhnye Chelny, previously from Kuban Krasnodar)
—	MF	RUS	Stepan Surikov (to Rubin-2 Kazan, previously on loan to Salyut Belgorod)
—	FW	CRO	Marko Čavara (on loan to SKA-Khabarovsk, previously from (Slovenia) Aluminij)
—	FW	RUS	Daniil Motorin (to Rubin-2 Kazan, previously on loan to Kosmos Dolgoprudny)
—	FW	RUS	Kamil Mullin (to Krasnodar-2, previously on loan to Volgar Astrakhan)
—	FW	RUS	Aleksandr Saplinov (end of loan from Rostov)

=== Sochi ===
In: Note: Flags indicate national team as defined under FIFA eligibility rules; some limited exceptions apply. Players may hold more than one non-FIFA nationality.

No.	Pos.	Nation	Player
4	DF	RUS	Vyacheslav Litvinov (from Krasnodar)
7	FW	SLO	Martin Kramarič (from (Slovenia) Bravo)
10	FW	RUS	Ivan Ignatyev (from Lokomotiv Moscow)
13	GK	RUS	Nikita Goylo (on loan from Zenit St. Petersburg)
15	DF	NGR	Solomon Agbalaka (on loan from (Nigeria) Broad City)
33	DF	BRA	Marcelo Alves (on loan from (Brazil) Madureira)
35	GK	RUS	Aleksandr Dyogtev (from Zenit St. Petersburg academy)
37	DF	RUS	Mark Chirkov (from Lokomotiv Moscow academy)
38	FW	RUS	Anton Kamyshenko (on loan from Lokomotiv Moscow academy)
44	DF	RUS	David Gigolayev (from Chertanovo Education Center)
50	MF	RUS	Daniil Chernov (from Krasnodar academy)
51	GK	RUS	Timofey Kashintsev (from Tekstilshchik Ivanovo)
60	MF	RUS	Mark Nosaty (from Spartak Moscow academy)
63	MF	RUS	Vladislav Shaparev (from Zenit St. Petersburg academy)
66	MF	RUS	Aleksandr Metsiyev (from Zenit St. Petersburg academy)
70	MF	RUS	Lev Alim (from Krasnodar academy)
71	DF	CZE	Jurij Medveděv (from (Slovakia) Slovan Bratislava)
74	MF	RUS	Aleksey Filimonov (from own academy)
78	DF	RUS	Platon Platonov (from own academy)
79	MF	RUS	Shodibek Sharipov (from own academy)
80	FW	RUS	Amur Balkizov (from FShM Moscow)
86	DF	RUS	Daniil Plyushchenko (from Spartak Moscow academy)
87	DF	RUS	Artur Koshman (from Torpedo Moscow)
88	GK	RUS	Andrey Belozertsev (from Krasnodar academy)

Out: Note: Flags indicate national team as defined under FIFA eligibility rules; some limited exceptions apply. Players may hold more than one non-FIFA nationality.

No.	Pos.	Nation	Player
1	GK	RUS	Denis Adamov (to Zenit St. Petersburg)
4	DF	MLI	Moussa Sissako (on loan to (Belgium) RWDM)
10	FW	RUS	Vladislav Sarveli (to Lokomotiv Moscow)
13	DF	RUS	Sergey Terekhov (to Khimki)
15	MF	RUS	Ibragim Tsallagov (to Alania Vladikavkaz)
19	MF	RUS	Timofey Shipunov (on loan to SKA-Khabarovsk)
22	FW	RUS	Joãozinho (to (Brazil) Novorizontino)
35	GK	RUS	Soslan Dzhanayev (to Baltika Kaliningrad)
54	DF	RUS	Artur Kuskov (on loan to Veles Moscow)
68	FW	RUS	Zakhar Fyodorov (on loan to Forte Taganrog)
76	FW	RUS	Denis Rubanov (on loan to Veles Moscow)
—	DF	NGR	Philip Ipole (to (Israel) Hapoel Hadera, previously on loan)
—	DF	RUS	Vadim Milyutin (to Tyumen, previously on loan)
—	MF	RUS	Renat Balkizov (to Biolog-Novokubansk, previously on loan to Saturn Ramenskoye)
—	MF	RUS	Aleksandr Kovalenko (to Zenit St. Petersburg, previously on loan to Krylia Sovetov Samara)
—	MF	RUS	Daniil Martovoy (on loan to Volgar Astrakhan, previously on loan to Rodina Moscow)
—	MF	RUS	Anatoli Nemchenko (to Yenisey Krasnoyarsk, previously on loan to Kosmos Dolgoprudny)
—	MF	RUS	Kirill Ushatov (to Volgar Astrakhan, previously on loan to Yenisey Krasnoyarsk)
—	FW	RUS	Maksim Kolmakov (on loan to Forte Taganrog, previously on loan to Neftekhimik Nizhnekamsk, previously on loan to Chayka Peschanokopskoye)
—	FW	RUS	Daniil Pavlov (on loan to Arsenal-2 Tula, previously on loan to Tyumen)
—	FW	RUS	Yegor Totsky (on loan to Forte Taganrog, previously from Krylia Sovetov Samara)

=== Spartak Moscow ===
In: Note: Flags indicate national team as defined under FIFA eligibility rules; some limited exceptions apply. Players may hold more than one non-FIFA nationality.

No.	Pos.	Nation	Player
2	DF	MDA	Oleg Reabciuk (from (Greece) Olympiacos)
6	DF	SRB	Srđan Babić (from (Spain) Almería)
13	MF	RUS	Maksim Laykin (end of loan to Neftekhimik Nizhnekamsk)
19	MF	PAR	Jesús Medina (from CSKA Moscow)
36	MF	RUS	Vadim Pastushkov (from own academy)
42	MF	RUS	Mikhail Pykhcheyev (from own academy)
43	MF	RUS	Nikita Kononenko (from own academy)
46	DF	RUS	Mikhail Kondratyev (from own academy)
48	DF	RUS	Aleksandr Danilov (from Konoplyov football academy)
50	MF	RUS	Maksim Nikiforov (from Rubin Kazan academy)
52	GK	RUS	Yegor Koshkin (from own academy)
53	GK	RUS	Anton Migunov (from Smena Moscow)
59	DF	RUS	Vladislav Davydov (from own academy)
63	DF	RUS	Daniil Pavlenko (from own academy)
73	DF	RUS	Aleksandr Sergin (from own academy)
77	FW	COD	Théo Bongonda (from (Spain) Cádiz)
88	GK	RUS	Ilya Svinov (end of loan to Fakel Voronezh)
89	MF	RUS	Dmitry Pavlov (from own academy)
95	GK	RUS	Dmitry Melnik (from own academy)
96	FW	RUS	Yegor Sysoyev (from own academy)

Out: Note: Flags indicate national team as defined under FIFA eligibility rules; some limited exceptions apply. Players may hold more than one non-FIFA nationality.

No.	Pos.	Nation	Player
9	FW	SEN	Keita Baldé (on loan to (Spain) Espanyol)
11	FW	JAM	Shamar Nicholson (on loan to (France) Clermont)
13	DF	POL	Maciej Rybus (to Rubin Kazan)
31	GK	RUS	Anton Shitov (to Veles Moscow)
37	DF	RUS	Maksim Vedeneyev (on loan to Kuban Krasnodar)
40	DF	RUS	Yaroslav Krashevsky (on loan to Yenisey Krasnoyarsk)
51	FW	RUS	Artur Maksimchuk (on loan to Salyut Belgorod)
52	MF	RUS	Mikhail Pilipenko (to Dynamo Bryansk)
63	DF	RUS	Yegor Chistyakov (to Fakel Voronezh U-19 squad)
66	MF	RUS	Fayziddin Nazhmov (to Strogino Moscow)
85	MF	RUS	Ivan Pyatkin (on loan to Rotor Volgograd)
87	MF	RUS	Daniil Zorin (on loan to (Belarus) Dinamo Minsk)
95	GK	RUS	Mikhail Volkov (to Torpedo Moscow)
96	MF	RUS	Rodion Kabakov
—	DF	BEL	Maximiliano Caufriez (to (France) Clermont, previously on loan)
—	DF	RUS	Ilya Golosov (to Arsenal Tula, previously on loan to Kuban Krasnodar)
—	DF	RUS	Nikolai Tolstopyatov (on loan to Pari Nizhny Novgorod, previously on loan to KAMAZ Naberezhnye Chelny)
—	DF	RUS	Danil Trukhanov (to Kosmos Dolgoprudny, previously on loan to Zvezda St. Petersburg)
—	MF	RUS	Nikita Bakalyuk (to Kuban Krasnodar, previously on loan to Arsenal Tula)
—	MF	CZE	Alex Král (on loan to (Germany) Union Berlin, previously on loan to (Germany) Schalke 04)
—	MF	RUS	Ilya Levchenkov (to Kosmos Dolgoprudny, previously on loan)
—	MF	RUS	Konstantin Shiltsov (on loan to Rodina Moscow, previously on loan to Pari Nizhny Novgorod)
—	FW	RUS	Stepan Oganesyan (to Orenburg, previously on loan)
—	FW	RUS	Vitali Shitov (on loan to Tyumen, previously on loan to Zvezda St. Petersburg)

=== Ural Yekaterinburg ===
In: Note: Flags indicate national team as defined under FIFA eligibility rules; some limited exceptions apply. Players may hold more than one non-FIFA nationality.

No.	Pos.	Nation	Player
9	FW	BRA	Guilherme Schettine (from (Portugal) Braga)
16	DF	BRA	Ítalo (on loan from (Portugal) Santa Clara)
17	DF	BLR	Vladislav Malkevich (from (Belarus) BATE Borisov)
21	MF	RUS	Igor Dmitriyev (from Leningradets)
25	DF	POR	Kiki (from (Portugal) Vizela)
50	FW	RUS	Maksim Voronov (from own academy)
55	MF	RUS	Timur Ayupov (from Orenburg)
71	GK	RUS	Aleksei Mamin (end of loan to KAMAZ Naberezhnye Chelny)
77	GK	BLR	Denis Shcherbitsky (from (Belarus) BATE Borisov)

Out: Note: Flags indicate national team as defined under FIFA eligibility rules; some limited exceptions apply. Players may hold more than one non-FIFA nationality.

No.	Pos.	Nation	Player
3	DF	RUS	Leo Goglichidze (on loan to Orenburg)
9	FW	SRB	Lazar Ranđelović (end of loan from (Greece) Olympiacos)
11	MF	RUS	Igor Konovalov (end of loan from Rubin Kazan)
13	GK	RUS	Dmitry Landakov (to Ural-2 Yekaterinburg)
14	MF	RUS	Yuri Zheleznov (on loan to Krasnodar-2)
16	MF	RUS	Dmitry Makovsky
17	MF	GEO	Luka Tsulukidze (on loan to (Georgia (country)) Dinamo Tbilisi)
21	MF	RUS	Vyacheslav Podberyozkin (to SKA-Khabarovsk)
27	MF	RUS	Oleg Shatov (retired)
36	DF	RUS	Ivan Lyubukhin (to Ural-2 Yekaterinburg)
48	MF	RUS	Artyom Komarov (to Ural-2 Yekaterinburg)
49	DF	RUS	Kirill Gurov (to Ural-2 Yekaterinburg)
50	FW	RUS	Artyom Galadzhan
51	MF	RUS	Artyom Kulikov (to Ural-2 Yekaterinburg)
53	MF	RUS	Surkhaykhan Abdullayev (to Ural-2 Yekaterinburg)
54	MF	RUS	Sergey Krotov (to Ural-2 Yekaterinburg)
56	MF	RUS	Sergey Loskutov (to Ural-2 Yekaterinburg)
59	GK	RUS	Vladimir Panov
64	DF	RUS	Yegor Zubarev (to Ural-2 Yekaterinburg)
71	FW	RUS	Daniil Arsentyev (on loan to Rotor Volgograd)
73	DF	RUS	Sergey Alekseyev (to Irkutsk)
77	MF	RUS	Oleg Baklov (to Ufa)
80	MF	RUS	Ivan Galanin (to Ural-2 Yekaterinburg)
83	DF	RUS	Gleb Geykin (to Zenit Penza)
85	DF	RUS	Viktor Kozyrev (to Ural-2 Yekaterinburg)
87	MF	RUS	Igor Druzhinin (to Tyumen)
94	MF	RUS	Ilya Bykovsky (to Arsenal Tula)
96	FW	RUS	Mikhail Ageyev (to Rotor Volgograd)
99	FW	RUS	Yevgeni Tatarinov (on loan to Tyumen)
—	GK	RUS	Vladislav Poletayev (to Irtysh Omsk, previously on loan to Forte Taganrog)
—	DF	RUS	Nikita Chistyakov (to Forte Taganrog, previously on loan to Novosibirsk)
—	DF	RUS	Aleksey Gerasimov (on loan to Neftekhimik Nizhnekamsk, previously on loan to KAMAZ Naberezhnye Chelny)
—	DF	RUS	Chingiz Magomadov (to Volga Ulyanovsk, previously on loan)
—	DF	RUS	Artyom Shmykov (to Ural-2 Yekaterinburg, previously on loan to Irtysh Omsk)
—	MF	RUS	Yuri Bavin (to SKA-Khabarovsk, previously on loan)
—	MF	RUS	Aleksey Yevseyev (to Tekstilshchik Ivanovo, previously on loan to Ufa)
—	FW	RUS	Ramazan Gadzhimuradov (on loan to Rotor Volgograd, previously on loan to Dynamo Makhachkala)
—	FW	RUS	Artyom Maksimenko (to (Armenia) Urartu, previously on loan to Rotor Volgograd)

=== Zenit Saint Petersburg ===
In: Note: Flags indicate national team as defined under FIFA eligibility rules; some limited exceptions apply. Players may hold more than one non-FIFA nationality.

No.	Pos.	Nation	Player
6	DF	RUS	Mário Fernandes (from (Brazil) Internacional)
10	FW	FRA	Wilson Isidor (on loan from Lokomotiv Moscow)
18	MF	RUS	Aleksandr Kovalenko (from Sochi)
16	GK	RUS	Denis Adamov (from Sochi)
25	DF	SRB	Strahinja Eraković (from (Serbia) Red Star Belgrade)
31	MF	BRA	Gustavo Mantuan (from (Brazil) Corinthians, previously on loan)
37	MF	BRA	Du Queiroz (from (Brazil) Corinthians)
45	MF	RUS	Kirill Glazunov (from own academy)
50	DF	RUS	Arseny Abzalilov (from Volgar Astrakhan academy)
52	FW	RUS	Timur Ivanov (from own academy)
56	FW	RUS	Aleksey Kolyshev (from own academy)
60	FW	RUS	Igor Bugayenko (from Dynamo St. Petersburg)
71	MF	RUS	Maksim Khalilov (from Dynamo Moscow academy)
74	MF	RUS	Denis Mushkarin (from own academy)
76	FW	RUS	Roman Kolmakov (on loan from Lokomotiv Moscow)
78	FW	RUS	Aleksandr Shirokov (from own academy)
80	DF	RUS	Artemy Kosogorov (from Lokomotiv Moscow)
81	FW	RUS	Nikita Bazilevsky (from own academy)
82	GK	RUS	Arkhip Laks (from own academy)
89	FW	RUS	Stanislav Lapinsky (from CSKA Moscow)
93	GK	RUS	Maksim Shichanin (from own academy)
98	DF	RUS	Stefan Kalinov (from own academy)

Out: Note: Flags indicate national team as defined under FIFA eligibility rules; some limited exceptions apply. Players may hold more than one non-FIFA nationality.

No.	Pos.	Nation	Player
7	MF	RUS	Zelimkhan Bakayev (on loan to (United Arab Emirates) Al Wahda)
10	FW	BRA	Malcom (to (Saudi Arabia) Al Hilal)
13	GK	RUS	Nikita Goylo (on loan to Sochi, previously on loan to Pari Nizhny Novgorod)
14	MF	RUS	Daler Kuzyayev (to (France) Le Havre)
23	DF	RUS	Arsen Adamov (on loan to Orenburg)
38	FW	RUS	Savva Kotov (to Spartak Nalchik)
40	DF	RUS	Ilya Vakhaniya (to Rostov)
42	DF	RUS	Damir Shaykhtdinov (on loan to Volgar Astrakhan)
50	FW	RUS	Aleksandr Yemelyanov (to Nosta Novotroitsk)
52	FW	RUS	Kirill Fateyev (to Chayka Peschanokopskoye)
54	DF	RUS	Ilya Kirsh (on loan to Rostov)
62	DF	RUS	Valery Murzakov
63	MF	RUS	Daniil Stolyarov (to Zvezda St. Petersburg)
67	FW	RUS	Nikita Luzan (to Baltika Kaliningrad)
71	GK	RUS	Daniil Odoyevsky (on loan to Volgar Astrakhan)
73	DF	RUS	Andrey Maryanov (to Spartak Kostroma)
75	MF	RUS	Ruslan Khayloyev
76	FW	RUS	Roni Mikhaylovsky (to Salyut Belgorod)
78	MF	RUS	Mikhail Chernomyrdin (to (Kazakhstan) Caspiy)
82	FW	RUS	Denis Orlov
84	DF	RUS	Viktor Kovrizhnikov
89	GK	RUS	Maksim Timofeyev (to Ryazan)
90	DF	RUS	Danil Savinykh (to Saturn Ramenskoye)
97	MF	RUS	Konstantin Troyanov (to Ufa)
—	GK	RUS	Nikolay Rybikov (to Volgar Astrakhan, previously on loan to Veles Moscow)
—	MF	RUS	Yaroslav Mikhaylov (on loan to Orenburg, previously from Pari Nizhny Novgorod, previously to Pari NN, previously on loan)
—	MF	RUS	Kirill Stolbov (on loan to Rostov, previously on loan to Yenisey Krasnoyarsk)
—	FW	RUS	Daniil Shamkin (to Torpedo Moscow, previously on loan to KAMAZ Naberezhnye Chelny)
