= FC Zarya Lugansk (2023) =

Zarya Lugansk
- Full name: Football Club Zarya Lugansk
- Founded: 2023; 3 years ago (as Zarya Lugansk)
- Ground: Novokolor-Arena, Abramovka
- Capacity: 550
- Manager: Aleksandr Maslov
- League: Russian Second League (Division B, group 1)
- 2026: 10th
- Website: https://fkzarya.ru/
Home colours	Away colours

FC Zarya Lugansk (Russian: ФК «Заря» Луганск) is a professional football club officially based in Luhansk (internationally recognized as Ukraine), but plays in Abramovka, Rostov Oblast, Russia.

== Club history ==
Following the Revolution of Dignity and the subsequent 2014 pro-Russian unrest in Ukraine, the Ukrainian government did not maintain control over the city of Luhansk. As a consequence, the historical club FC Zorya Luhansk was not able to play their home games in the city, and played in other cities, including Zaporizhzhia and Kyiv. During the Russo-Ukrainian war, Luhansk Oblast was annexed by Russia in 2022, making teams based in Luhansk eligible to enter the Russian football competition system. The club was formed in 2023 under the name Zarya ("Zarya" and "Zorya" are the words for "dawn" in Russian and Ukrainian languages respectively) and played in local amateur competitions. The team has been described as a "fake team" and a "rip-off of Ukraine's Zorya Luhansk". As Avanhard Stadium is not available to use due to its damage and the continuing war, the team plays home games in Abramovka, Rostov Oblast, which is approximately 160 km away from Luhansk. For the 2026 season, Zarya was licensed for the fourth-tier Russian Second League Division B group 1.

=== Commonwealth League ===
Zorya Lugansk first competed in the Commonwealth League in 2024, achieving 3rd place with a total of 31 point after 18 games. Second place was a fellow team Dynamo Luhansk. In 2025, although only achieving 9th place with 8 points after 18 games, Zarya joined the Russian Second League Division B alongside Shakhytor. A reserve team, Zarya-2, continues to compete in the Commonwealth League.

== Current squad ==
As of 11 September 2026

Note: Flags indicate national team as defined under FIFA eligibility rules; some limited exceptions apply. Players may hold more than one non-FIFA nationality.

No.	Pos.	Nation	Player
4	DF	RUS	Danil Skrypnikov
7	MF	RUS	Roman Romanov
8	DF	RUS	Nikita Kukanov
9	FW	RUS	Valentin Ushakov
10	MF	RUS	Nikita Muromsky
11	FW	RUS	Mikhail Zakharov
14	MF	RUS	Yegor Pogasay
15	MF	RUS	Valery Titarenko
16	GK	RUS	Maksim Mikityuk
17	MF	RUS	Ivan Glushchenko
18	MF	RUS	Sergey Demchenko

No.	Pos.	Nation	Player
19	MF	RUS	Sergey Tsindrik
20	FW	RUS	Denis Kostyuchenko
21	DF	RUS	Konstantin Antonets
23	GK	UKR	Myroslav Znovenko
24	DF	RUS	Aleksey Mikhaylov
70	MF	RUS	Oleg Oznobikhin
72	MF	UKR	Maksym Ahapov
80	MF	UKR	Artem Sholar
83	DF	RUS	Denis Pershin
90	FW	RUS	Timur Sharapov

== See also ==
- Luhansk Oblast Football Association
