= Aleksandr Maslov =

Russian footballer

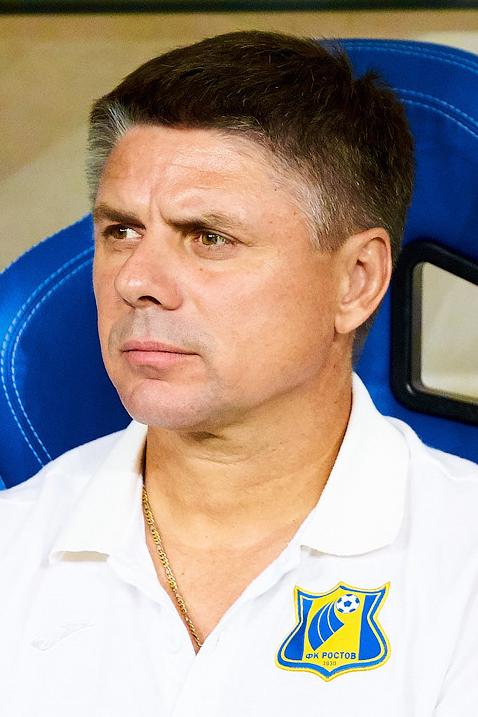
- Maslov working with FC Rostov in 2018

Personal information
- Full name: Aleksandr Vladimirovich Maslov
- Date of birth: 25 December 1969 (age 56)
- Place of birth: Makhachkala, Soviet Union
- Height: 1.82 m (5 ft 11 1/2 in)
- Position: Striker

Team information
- Current team: Zarya Lugansk (manager)

Senior career*
Years	Team	Apps	(Gls)
1987, 1990	Dynamo Makhachkala	17	(4)
1991–1992	Nart Cherkessk	55	(26)
1992–1993	Dynamo Stavropol	27	(6)
1993–1997	Rostselmash Rostov-on-Don	134	(81)
1998	Albacete Balompié	10	(1)
1999	Neuchâtel Xamax	18	(11)
1999–2000	Sion	34	(18)
2000–2001	Winterthur	41	(11)
2002–2004	Rostov Rostov-on-Don	42	(9)

Managerial career
- 2004–2007: Rostov (assistant)
- 2008: Rostov (U21 assistant)
- 2009: Rostov (assistant)
- 2010–2011: Rostov (U21 assistant)
- 2011–2012: Rostov (assistant)
- 2012–2014: Rostov (U21 assistant)
- 2014–2015: Rostov (assistant)
- 2015–2017: Rostov (U21 assistant)
- 2017–2018: Rostov (U21)
- 2018–2019: Rostov (senior coach)
- 2019: Rostov (U21)
- 2023: Forte Taganrog (caretaker)
- 2024–2025: Forte Taganrog (assistant)
- 2026–: Zarya Lugansk
- * Club domestic league appearances and goals

Aleksandr Vladimirovich Maslov (Russian: Алекса́ндр Влади́мирович Ма́слов; born 25 December 1969) is a Russian football coach and a former player who is the manager of Zarya Lugansk. He played as a striker for Russian, Spanish and Swiss professional clubs, most notably for Rostov.

Aleksandr Maslov started his player career in a Soviet Second League club Dynamo Makhachkala. In 1991, he moved to play for Nart Cherkessk, a club that was given a place in the 1992 Russian Second Division after the dissolution of USSR. In 1992, he debuted in the Russian Top Division with Dynamo Stavropol.

In the middle of 1993 season Maslov transferred to Rostselmash, another Top Division side. Rostselmash were relegated that season, and in 1994 Maslov scored 32 goals to help them win the promotion back. In 1996, he became the top scorer of the Russian Top Division, scoring 23 goals in 33 matches.

In 1998 Maslov moved to Spain to play for Albacete. His spell with the club was not successful, as he made only 8 appearances in the course of a year. In 1999-2001 Maslov played for various Swiss clubs.

In 2002, he returned to Rostov-on-Don to play for the renamed Rostov. After finishing his player career in 2004 he started working at Rostov as an assistant coach.

Maslov holds records for most goals scored for Rostov in the Russian league overall (90) and in one season (23).
