= Roman Romanov (footballer, born 2003) =

Russian footballer

Personal information
- Full name: Roman Yevgenyevich Romanov
- Date of birth: 28 March 2003 (age 23)
- Height: 1.78 m (5 ft 10 in)
- Position: Midfielder

Team information
- Current team: Zarya Lugansk
- Number: 7

Youth career
- –2018: Spartak Moscow
- 2018–2022: Rostov

Senior career*
Years	Team	Apps	(Gls)
2020–2022	Rostov	1	(1)
2022–2023	Forte Taganrog	14	(1)
2023–2024	SKA Rostov-on-Don	13	(3)
2024–2025	Zarya Lugansk (amateur)		
2026–	Zarya Lugansk	27	(7)
- * Club domestic league appearances and goals as of 31 October 2026

Roman Yevgenyevich Romanov (Russian: Роман Евгеньевич Романов; born 28 March 2003) is a Russian professional football player who plays for Zarya Lugansk.

== Club career ==
He made his debut in the Russian Premier League for Rostov on 19 June 2020 in a game against Sochi. Rostov was forced to field their Under-18 squad in that game as their main squad was quarantined after 6 players tested positive for COVID-19. He scored a goal in the first minute of the game which eventually ended with the score of 10–1 for Sochi.
