= Aleksandr Chernikov (footballer, born 2000) =

Russian football player

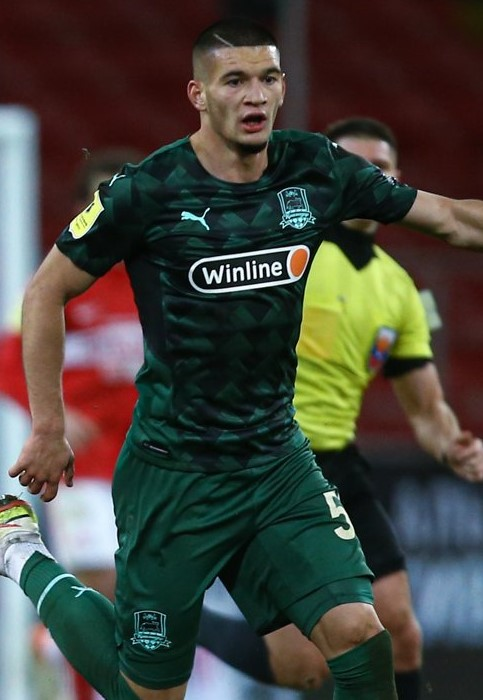
- Chernikov with Krasnodar in 2022

Personal information
- Full name: Aleksandr Yevgenyevich Chernikov
- Date of birth: 1 February 2000 (age 26)
- Place of birth: Vyselki, Russia
- Height: 1.84 m (6 ft 0 in)
- Position: Defensive midfielder

Team information
- Current team: Krasnodar
- Number: 53

Youth career
- DYuSSh Vyselki
- –2019: Krasnodar

Senior career*
Years	Team	Apps	(Gls)
2018–2019	Krasnodar-3	3	(0)
2018–2022	Krasnodar-2	57	(4)
2019–	Krasnodar	134	(6)

International career^{‡}
2016	Russia U-16	3	(0)
2018	Russia U-18	3	(1)
2018–2019	Russia U-19	5	(0)
2019	Russia U-20	2	(0)
2021	Russia U-21	1	(0)
2023–	Russia	5	(1)
- * Club domestic league appearances and goals as of 22 November 2026 ‡ National team caps and goals as of 12 November 2025

Aleksandr Yevgenyevich Chernikov (Russian: Александр Евгеньевич Черников; born 1 February 2000) is a Russian footballer who plays as a defensive midfielder for FC Krasnodar and Russia national team.

== Club career ==
He made his debut in the Russian Professional Football League for FC Krasnodar-2 on 17 March 2018 in a game against FC Biolog-Novokubansk. He made his Russian Football National League debut for Krasnodar-2 on 22 July 2018 in a game against FC SKA-Khabarovsk.

He made his debut for the main squad of FC Krasnodar on 25 September 2019 in a Russian Cup game against FC Nizhny Novgorod. He made his Russian Premier League debut for Krasnodar on 1 March 2020 in a game against FC Ufa, he started the game and was substituted at half-time.

== International career ==
He was called up to the Russia national football team for the first time in October 2021 for the World Cup qualifiers against Cyprus and Croatia. He was included in the extended 41-players list of candidates.

Chernikov made his debut on 20 November 2023 in a friendly against Cuba.

== Career statistics ==
=== Club ===
As of match played 22 November 2026

Appearances and goals by club, season and competition
Club	Season	League			Cup		Continental		Other		Total	
Club	Season	Division	Apps	Goals	Apps	Goals	Apps	Goals	Apps	Goals	Apps	Goals
Krasnodar-2	2017–18	Russian Second League	3	0	—		—		1 (Note: Appearances in the FNL Cup)	0	4	0
Krasnodar-2	2018–19	Russian First League	21	2	—		—		—		21	2
Krasnodar-2	2019–20	Russian First League	15	2	—		—		—		15	2
Krasnodar-2	2020–21	Russian First League	16	0	—		—		—		16	0
Krasnodar-2	2021–22	Russian First League	2	0	—		—		—		2	0
Krasnodar-2	Total		57	4	0	0	0	0	1	0	58	4
Krasnodar-3	2018–19	Russian Second League	1	0	—		—		—		1	0
Krasnodar-3	2019–20	Russian Second League	2	0	—		—		—		2	0
Krasnodar-3	Total		3	0	0	0	0	0	0	0	3	0
Krasnodar	2018–19	Russian Premier League	0	0	0	0	0	0	—		0	0
Krasnodar	2019–20	Russian Premier League	6	0	1	0	0	0	—		7	0
Krasnodar	2020–21	Russian Premier League	1	0	0	0	0	0	—		1	0
Krasnodar	2021–22	Russian Premier League	23	2	2	1	—		—		25	3
Krasnodar	2022–23	Russian Premier League	13	0	6	0	—		—		19	0
Krasnodar	2023–24	Russian Premier League	27	1	7	0	—		—		34	1
Krasnodar	2024–25	Russian Premier League	27	2	7	0	—		1 (Note: Appearances in Russian Super Cup)	0	35	2
Krasnodar	2025–26	Russian Premier League	23	1	6	0	—		1	0	30	1
Krasnodar	2026–27	Russian Premier League	14	0	3	0	—		—		17	0
Krasnodar	Total		134	6	32	1	0	0	2	0	168	7
Career total			194	10	32	1	0	0	3	0	229	11

=== International ===
As of match played 12 November 2025

Appearances and goals by national team and year
National team	Year	Apps	Goals
Russia	2023	1	0
Russia	2024	1	1
Russia	2025	3	0
Total		5	1

=== International goals ===
No.	Date	Venue	Opponent	Score	Result	Competition
1.	15 November 2024	Krasnodar Stadium, Krasnodar, Russia	Brunei	9–0	11–0	Friendly

== Honours ==
Krasnodar

- Russian Premier League: 2024–25
