= Nikita Muromsky =

Russian football player

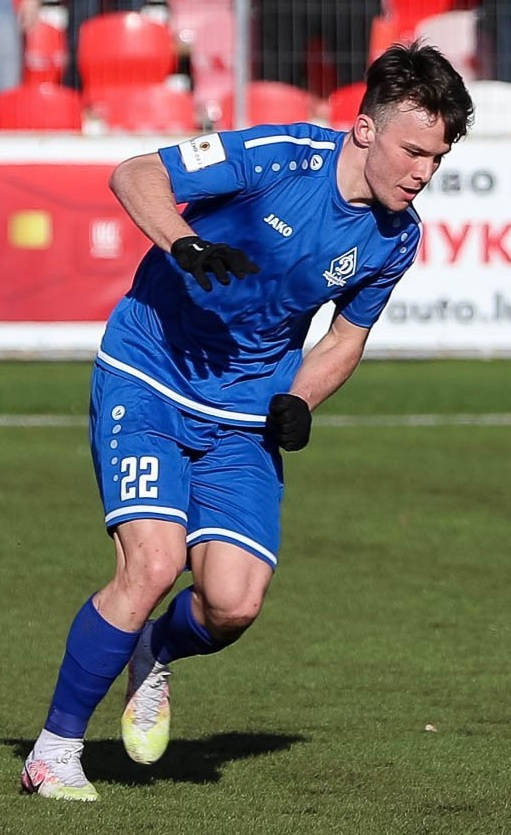
- Muromsky with Dynamo Bryansk in 2021

Personal information
- Full name: Nikita Sergeyevich Muromsky
- Date of birth: 25 June 1999 (age 27)
- Place of birth: Yekaterinburg, Russia
- Height: 1.76 m (5 ft 9 in)
- Position: Midfielder

Team information
- Current team: Zarya Lugansk
- Number: 10

Youth career
- 2017–2018: Ural Yekaterinburg
- 2018–2019: Rotor Volgograd

Senior career*
Years	Team	Apps	(Gls)
2019–2021	Rotor Volgograd	0	(0)
2019	→ Rotor-2 Volgograd	14	(1)
2021	Dynamo Bryansk	16	(0)
2021–2022	Volgar Astrakhan	2	(0)
2021–2022	→ Volga Ulyanovsk (loan)	21	(2)
2022–2023	Volga Ulyanovsk	2	(0)
2023–2025	Forte Taganrog	69	(13)
2025–2026	Saturn Ramenskoye	6	(0)
2026–	Zarya Lugansk	14	(0)
- * Club domestic league appearances and goals as of 31 October 2026

Nikita Sergeyevich Muromsky (Russian: Никита Сергеевич Муромский; born 25 June 1999) is a Russian football player who plays for Zarya Lugansk.

== Club career ==
He made his debut in the Russian Football National League for Dynamo Bryansk on 27 February 2021 in a game against Spartak-2 Moscow.
