= Maksym Ahapov =

Ukrainian footballer (born 2000)

Personal information
- Full name: Maksym Olehovych Ahapov
- Date of birth: 28 February 2000 (age 26)
- Place of birth: Luhansk, Ukraine
- Height: 1.72 m (5 ft 8 in)
- Position: Right-back

Team information
- Current team: Zarya Lugansk
- Number: 72

Youth career
- 2013–2014: Zorya Luhansk
- 2015: UFK-Metal Kharkiv
- 2015–2016: KDYuSSh-13 Kharkiv
- 2016–2017: UFK-Metal Kharkiv

Senior career*
Years	Team	Apps	(Gls)
2017–2021	Zorya Luhansk	0	(0)
2021	→ VPK-Ahro Shevchenkivka (loan)	13	(0)
2021–2022	Kramatorsk	16	(0)
2022–2023	Kremin Kremenchuk	22	(0)
2024	Zvezda St. Petersburg	14	(0)
2024–2025	Zarya Lugansk		
2026–	Zarya Lugansk	25	(2)

International career
2018	Ukraine U-19	4	(0)
- * Club domestic league appearances and goals as of 31 October 2026

Maksym Olehovych Ahapov (Ukrainian: Максим Олегович Агапов; born 28 February 2000) is a Ukrainian professional footballer who plays as a right-back for Russian club Zarya Lugansk. He also holds Russian citizenship.

On 24 August 2022 Ahapov moved to Ukrainian First League club Kremin Kremenchuk. He signed a two-year contract and took number 72 shirt. He made his debut for Kremin on 27 August playing full 90 minutes in a 3:3 draw against Metalurh.
