= Abramovka, Rostov Oblast =

Abramovka Абрамовка
- Khutor
- Location within Rostov Oblast Location within Russia
- Coordinates: 48°17′N 40°20′E
- Country: Russia
- Region: Rostov Oblast
- District: Kamensky District
- Time zone: UTC+3:00

Abramovka (Russian: Абрамовка) is a rural locality (a khutor) in Starostanichnoye Rural Settlement of Kamensky District, Rostov Oblast, Russia. The population was 790 as of 2010. There are 89 streets.

== Geography ==
Abramovka is located 20 km south of Gluboky (the district's administrative centre) by road. Dichensky is the nearest rural locality.
