= Aleksandr Koksharov =

Russian footballer (born 2004)

Personal information
- Full name: Aleksandr Eduardovich Koksharov
- Date of birth: 20 December 2004 (age 21)
- Place of birth: Celje, Slovenia
- Height: 1.92 m (6 ft 4 in)
- Position: Forward

Team information
- Current team: Fakel Voronezh (on loan from Krasnodar)
- Number: 90

Youth career
- Krasnodar

Senior career*
Years	Team	Apps	(Gls)
2022–	Krasnodar	13	(1)
2023–2024	Krasnodar-2	12	(2)
2024–2025	→ Pari Nizhny Novgorod (loan)	5	(1)
2026–	→ Fakel Voronezh (loan)	9	(1)

International career^{‡}
2023	Russia U21	1	(2)
- * Club domestic league appearances and goals as of 21 November 2026 ‡ National team caps and goals as of 15 November 2023

Aleksandr Eduardovich Koksharov (Russian: Александр Эдуардович Кокшаров; born 20 December 2004) is a Russian footballer who plays as a forward for Fakel Voronezh on loan from Krasnodar.

== Career ==
Koksharov made his debut for Krasnodar on 28 September 2022 in a Russian Cup game against Pari Nizhny Novgorod. He made his Russian Premier League debut for Krasnodar on 3 October 2022 against Krylia Sovetov Samara. He scored his first RPL goal for Krasnodar on 21 May 2023 against Rostov.

On 19 December 2024, Koksharov moved on loan to Pari Nizhny Novgorod until the end of the 2024–25 season.

On 2 September 2026, Koksharov was loaned by Fakel Voronezh. On 21 November 2026, he suffered a tibia fracture in a game, which is expected to keep him out of play for the remainder of the 2026–27 season and his loan term.

== Personal life ==
His father Eduard Koksharov was an Olympic champion in handball. Aleksandr was born in Celje, Slovenia, where his father was playing club handball at the time.

== Career statistics ==
As of match played 21 November 2026

Appearances and goals by club, season and competition
Club	Season	League			Cup		Continental		Other		Total	
Club	Season	Division	Apps	Goals	Apps	Goals	Apps	Goals	Apps	Goals	Apps	Goals
Krasnodar	2022–23	Russian Premier League	7	1	2	1	–		–		9	2
Krasnodar	2023–24	Russian Premier League	6	0	3	2	–		–		9	2
Krasnodar	2024–25	Russian Premier League	0	0	2	0	–		–		2	0
Krasnodar	2026–27	Russian Premier League	0	0	1	0	–		–		1	0
Krasnodar	Total		13	1	8	3	–		–		21	4
Krasnodar-2	2022–23	Russian First League	3	0	–		–		–		3	0
Krasnodar-2	2023–24	Russian Second League	7	2	–		–		–		7	2
Krasnodar-2	2024–25	Russian Second League	2	0	–		–		–		2	0
Krasnodar-2	Total		12	2	–		–		–		12	2
Pari Nizhny Novgorod (loan)	2024–25	Russian Premier League	5	1	–		–		–		5	1
Fakel Voronezh (loan)	2026–27	Russian Premier League	9	1	2	0	–		–		11	1
Career total			39	5	10	3	0	0	0	0	49	8
