= Rustam Khalnazarov =

Russian footballer

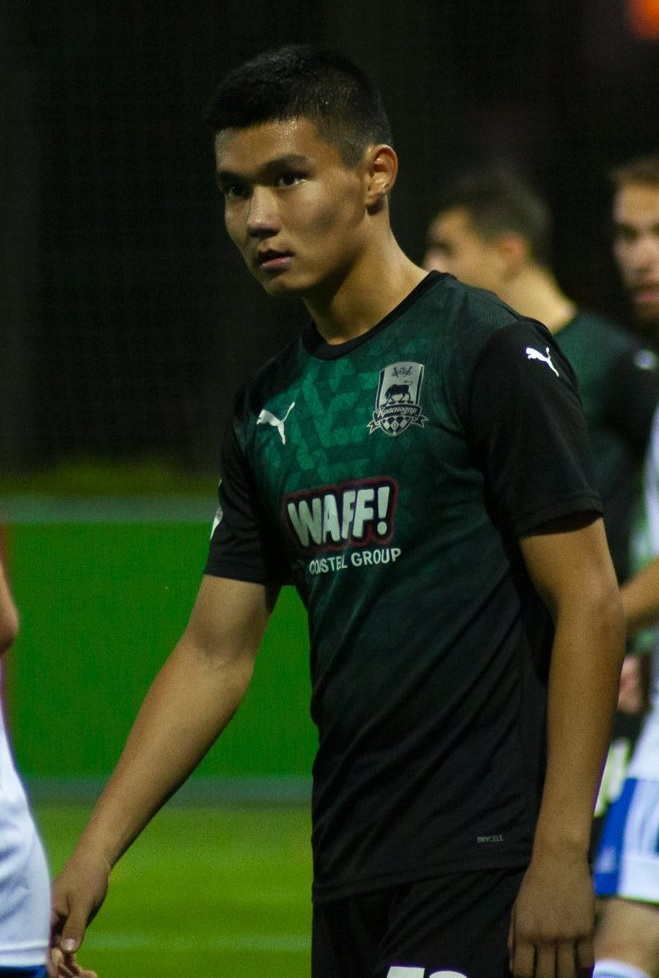
- Khalnazarov with Krasnodar-2 in 2019

Personal information
- Full name: Rustam Abdurashitovich Khalnazarov
- Date of birth: 20 July 2000 (age 26)
- Place of birth: Novosibirsk, Russia
- Height: 1.75 m (5 ft 9 in)
- Position: Forward

Team information
- Current team: SKA Rostov

Youth career
- 2017–2019: Krasnodar

Senior career*
| Years | Team | Apps | (Gls) |
| 2018–2024 | Krasnodar-2 | 93 | (12) |
| 2018–2020 | Krasnodar-3 | 10 | (1) |
| 2022–2024 | Krasnodar | 1 | (0) |
| 2023–2024 | → Arsenal Tula (loan) | 11 | (0) |
| 2024 | → Telavi (loan) | 15 | (0) |
| 2024–2025 | Lokomotiv Tashkent | 12 | (1) |
| 2025 | Bars | 9 | (2) |
| 2025–2026 | Murom | 14 | (2) |
| 2026 | Dynamo Stavropol | 4 | (0) |
| 2026– | SKA Rostov | 0 | (0) |

International career^{‡}
| 2018 | Russia U-18 | 3 | (3) |
| 2018–2019 | Russia U-19 | 12 | (2) |
- * Club domestic league appearances and goals as of 19 June 2026 ‡ National team caps and goals as of 26 March 2019

Rustam Abdurashitovich Khalnazarov (Russian: Рустам Абдурашитович Халназаров; born 20 July 2000) is a Russian professional football player who plays for SKA Rostov.

== Club career ==
He made his debut in the Russian Professional Football League for Krasnodar-2 on 16 May 2018 in a game against Afips Afipsky. He made his Russian Football National League debut for Krasnodar-2 on 17 July 2018 in a game against Sibir Novosibirsk.

Khalnazarov made his Russian Premier League debut for Krasnodar on 29 July 2022 against Ural Yekaterinburg.

On 3 July 2023, Khalnazarov joined Arsenal Tula on loan.

=== Lokomotiv Tashkent ===
On 6 July 2024, Uzbekistan Super League club Lokomotiv Tashkent announced the signing of Khalnazarov.

== Career statistics ==
As of 27 November 2022

| Club | Season | League | | | Cup | | Continental | | Other | | Total | |
| Club | Season | Division | Apps | Goals | Apps | Goals | Apps | Goals | Apps | Goals | Apps | Goals |
|---|---|---|---|---|---|---|---|---|---|---|---|---|
| Krasnodar-2 | 2017–18 | Second League | 0 | 0 | – | | – | | 2 (Note: Appearances in the FNL Cup) | 0 | 2 | 0 |
| Krasnodar-2 | 2018–19 | First League | 20 | 3 | – | | – | | 4 | 0 | 24 | 3 |
| Krasnodar-2 | 2019–20 | First League | 20 | 0 | – | | – | | – | | 20 | 0 |
| Krasnodar-2 | 2020–21 | First League | 12 | 1 | – | | – | | – | | 12 | 1 |
| Krasnodar-2 | 2021–22 | First League | 12 | 6 | – | | – | | – | | 12 | 6 |
| Krasnodar-2 | 2022–23 | First League | 18 | 1 | – | | – | | – | | 18 | 1 |
| Krasnodar-2 | Total | | 82 | 11 | 0 | 0 | 0 | 0 | 6 | 0 | 88 | 11 |
| Krasnodar-3 | 2018–19 | Second League | 7 | 1 | – | | – | | – | | 7 | 1 |
| Krasnodar-3 | 2019–20 | Second League | 3 | 0 | – | | – | | – | | 3 | 0 |
| Krasnodar-3 | Total | | 10 | 1 | 0 | 0 | 0 | 0 | 0 | 0 | 10 | 1 |
| Krasnodar | 2022–23 | RPL | 1 | 0 | 0 | 0 | – | | – | | 1 | 0 |
| Career total | | | 93 | 12 | 0 | 0 | 0 | 0 | 6 | 0 | 99 | 12 |
