= Sergei Sharov =

Russian footballer

Personal information
- Full name: Sergei Vladimirovich Sharov
- Date of birth: 11 February 1992 (age 34)
- Place of birth: Shakhty, Russia
- Height: 1.72 m (5 ft 8 in)
- Position: Midfielder

Team information
- Current team: FC Fankom Kirov

Senior career*
Years	Team	Apps	(Gls)
2011–2012	FC SKA Rostov-on-Don	31	(0)
2012–2013	FC Volgar Astrakhan	1	(0)
2013	FC Biolog-Novokubansk	10	(0)
2013	FC Rus Saint Petersburg	20	(1)
2014–2015	FC Vityaz Krymsk	28	(0)
2015	FC Angusht Nazran	17	(0)
2016	FC SKA Rostov-on-Don	9	(0)
2016–2017	FC Sochi	28	(0)
2017–2018	FC Afips Afipsky	31	(2)
2018–2019	FC Chayka Peschanokopskoye	23	(0)
2020–2022	FC Tver	56	(1)
2022–2023	FC Novosibirsk	16	(0)
2023	FC Spartak Kostroma	10	(0)
2023–2024	FC Krasnodar-2	11	(0)
2024–2025	FC Amkar Perm	24	(0)
2025–2026	FC Dynamo Kirov	29	(1)
2026–	FC Fankom Kirov	0	(0)
- * Club domestic league appearances and goals as of 15 March 2026

Sergei Vladimirovich Sharov (Russian: Серге́й Владимирович Шаров; born 11 February 1992) is a Russian football midfielder who plays for Russian Amateur Football League club FC Fankom Kirov.

== Club career ==
He made his debut in the Russian Second Division for FC SKA Rostov-on-Don on 26 April 2011 in a game against FC Torpedo Armavir.

He made his Russian Football National League debut for FC Volgar Astrakhan on 19 November 2012 in a game against FC Shinnik Yaroslavl.
