= Stepan Oganesyan =

Russian footballer

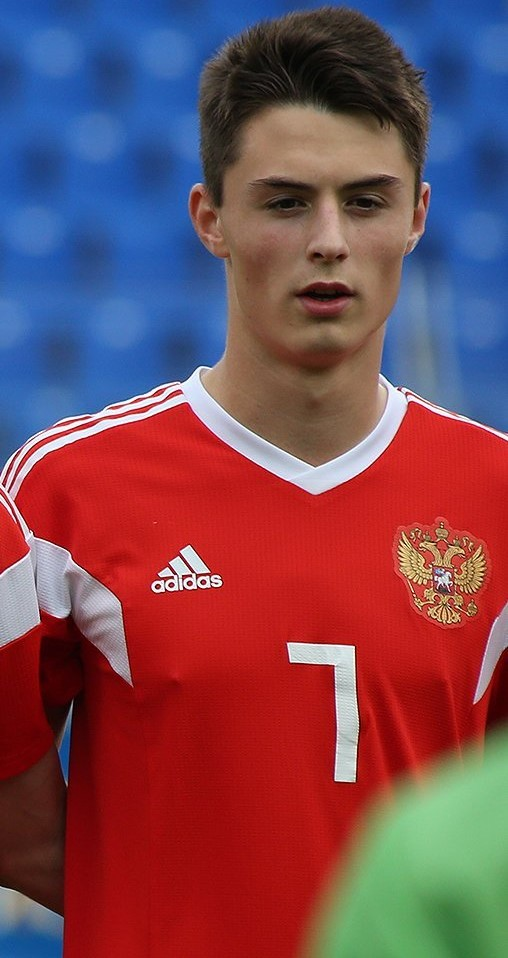
- Oganesyan with Russia U18 in 2019

Personal information
- Full name: Stepan Ivanovich Oganesyan
- Date of birth: 28 September 2001 (age 25)
- Place of birth: Mezhdurechensk, Russia
- Height: 1.83 m (6 ft 0 in)
- Position: Forward

Team information
- Current team: FC Torpedo Moscow
- Number: 9

Youth career
- –2012: DYuSSh Zinina Mezhdurechensk
- 2012–2019: UOR #5 Yegoryevsk
- 2019: FC Spartak Moscow

Senior career*
| Years | Team | Apps | (Gls) |
| 2019–2022 | FC Spartak-2 Moscow | 69 | (14) |
| 2020–2023 | FC Spartak Moscow | 1 | (0) |
| 2022–2023 | → FC Orenburg (loan) | 20 | (2) |
| 2023–2026 | FC Orenburg | 40 | (1) |
| 2026– | FC Torpedo Moscow | 0 | (0) |

International career^{‡}
| 2018 | Russia U17 | 4 | (0) |
| 2019 | Russia U18 | 9 | (1) |
| 2019–2020 | Russia U19 | 8 | (0) |
| 2021 | Russia U21 | 1 | (0) |
- * Club domestic league appearances and goals as of 22 November 2025 ‡ National team caps and goals as of 7 September 2023

Stepan Ivanovich Oganesyan (Armenian: Ստեփան Իվանի Հովհանիսյան; Russian: Степан Иванович Оганесян; born 28 September 2001) is a Russian football player of Armenian descent who plays as a winger or centre-forward for FC Torpedo Moscow.

== Club career ==
He made his debut in the Russian Football National League for FC Spartak-2 Moscow on 9 March 2020 in a game against FC Tekstilshchik Ivanovo. He started and played a full game.

He made his Russian Premier League debut for FC Spartak Moscow on 17 October 2020 in a 3–2 away victory over FC Khimki, substituting Aleksandr Kokorin in the 80th minute.

On 29 June 2022, Oganesyan joined FC Orenburg on loan with an option to buy. On 7 June 2023, Orenburg made the transfer permanent. Oganesyan left Orenburg in June 2026 as his contract expired.

== International career ==
Oganesyan was first called up to the Russia national football team for a training camp in September 2023.

== Career statistics ==
=== Club ===
As of match played 26 November 2025

Appearances and goals by club, season and competition
| Club | Season | League | | | Cup | | Europe | | Other | | Total | |
| Club | Season | Division | Apps | Goals | Apps | Goals | Apps | Goals | Apps | Goals | Apps | Goals |
|---|---|---|---|---|---|---|---|---|---|---|---|---|
| Spartak-2 Moscow | 2019–20 | Russian First League | 2 | 0 | – | | – | | – | | 2 | 0 |
| Spartak-2 Moscow | 2020–21 | Russian First League | 32 | 8 | – | | – | | – | | 32 | 8 |
| Spartak-2 Moscow | 2021–22 | Russian First League | 35 | 6 | – | | – | | – | | 35 | 6 |
| Spartak-2 Moscow | Total | | 69 | 14 | 0 | 0 | 0 | 0 | 0 | 0 | 69 | 14 |
| Spartak Moscow | 2020–21 | Russian Premier League | 1 | 0 | 1 | 0 | – | | 0 | 0 | 2 | 0 |
| Spartak Moscow | 2021–22 | Russian Premier League | 0 | 0 | 0 | 0 | 0 | 0 | 0 | 0 | 0 | 0 |
| Spartak Moscow | Total | | 1 | 0 | 1 | 0 | 0 | 0 | 0 | 0 | 2 | 0 |
| Orenburg (loan) | 2022–23 | Russian Premier League | 20 | 2 | 4 | 1 | – | | – | | 24 | 3 |
| Orenburg | 2023–24 | Russian Premier League | 18 | 1 | 5 | 1 | – | | – | | 23 | 2 |
| Orenburg | 2024–25 | Russian Premier League | 10 | 0 | 5 | 0 | – | | – | | 15 | 0 |
| Orenburg | 2025–26 | Russian Premier League | 12 | 0 | 5 | 0 | – | | – | | 17 | 0 |
| Orenburg | Total | | 40 | 1 | 15 | 0 | – | | – | | 55 | 0 |
| Career total | | | 130 | 17 | 20 | 2 | 0 | 0 | 0 | 0 | 150 | 19 |
