= Atsamaz Revazov =

Russian footballer (born 2005)

Personal information
- Full name: Atsamaz Izmailovich Revazov
- Date of birth: 15 April 2005 (age 21)
- Place of birth: Alagir, North Ossetia–Alania, Russia
- Height: 1.69 m (5 ft 7 in)
- Position: Winger

Team information
- Current team: Rotor Volgograd (on loan from Orenburg)
- Number: 12

Youth career
- –2023: Krasnodar

Senior career*
Years	Team	Apps	(Gls)
2024	Kuban-Holding	29	(3)
2024–	Orenburg	12	(1)
2025–	Orenburg-2	1	(0)
2026	→ KAMAZ (loan)	12	(0)
2026–	→ Rotor Volgograd (loan)	0	(0)
- * Club domestic league appearances and goals as of 16 May 2026

Atsamaz Izmailovich Revazov (Russian: Ацамаз Измаилович Ревазов; born 15 April 2005) is a Russian football player who plays as a winger on either left or right for Rotor Volgograd on loan from Orenburg.

== Career ==
Revazov joined Russian Premier League club Orenburg in February 2025. He made his RPL debut for Orenburg on 29 March 2025 in a game against Dynamo Moscow. In his fourth game on 19 April 2025, he scored his first RPL goal, a late winner in a 2–1 victory over Dynamo Makhachkala.

On 23 January 2026, Revazov was loaned by KAMAZ. On 3 July 2026, he moved on a new loan to Rotor Volgograd.

== Career statistics ==
As of 16 May 2026

Club	Season	League			Cup		Total	
Club	Season	Division	Apps	Goals	Apps	Goals	Apps	Goals
Kuban-Holding	2024	Russian Second League B	29	3	4	3	33	6
Orenburg	2024–25	Russian Premier League	7	1	–		7	1
Orenburg	2025–26	Russian Premier League	5	0	6	1	11	1
Orenburg	Total		12	1	6	1	18	2
Orenburg-2	2025	Russian Second League B	1	0	–		1	0
KAMAZ (loan)	2025–26	Russian First League	12	0	–		12	0
Career total			54	4	10	4	64	8
