= Mikhail Bersnev =

Russian footballer

Personal information
- Full name: Mikhail Vladimirovich Bersnev
- Date of birth: 31 March 2002 (age 24)
- Place of birth: Ivanovo, Russia
- Height: 1.82 m (6 ft 0 in)
- Position: Forward

Youth career
- –2014: Tekstilshchik Ivanovo
- 2014–2016: Dynamo Moscow
- 2017–2021: Krasnodar

Senior career*
Years	Team	Apps	(Gls)
2019–2021	Krasnodar-3	15	(3)
2021–2023	Krasnodar-2	19	(0)
2023–2024	Astrakhan	16	(7)
2024	Rubin Yalta	13	(0)
- * Club domestic league appearances and goals as of 9 November 2024

Mikhail Vladimirovich Bersnev (Russian: Михаил Владимирович Берснев; born 31 March 2002) is a Russian football player.

== Club career ==
He made his debut in the Russian Football National League for FC Krasnodar-2 on 10 July 2021 in a game against Spartak-2 Moscow.
