= Mikhail Sukhoruchenko =

Russian footballer

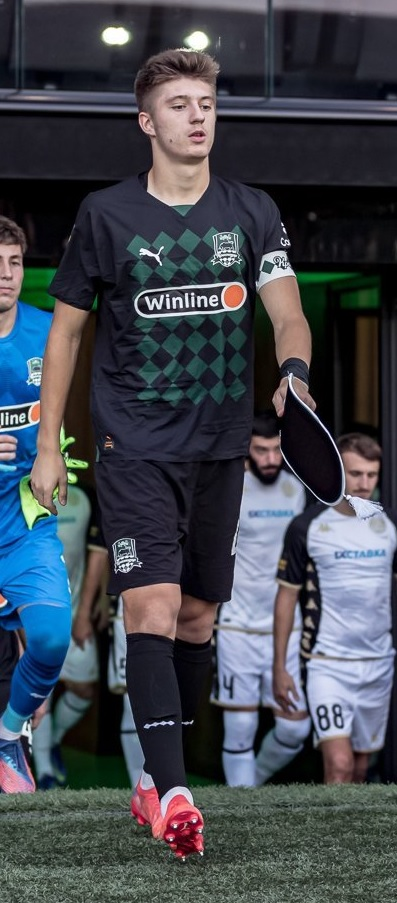
- Sukhoruchenko with Krasnodar-2 in 2022

Personal information
- Full name: Mikhail Yuryevich Sukhoruchenko
- Date of birth: 13 April 2003 (age 23)
- Place of birth: Odesa, Ukraine
- Height: 1.90 m (6 ft 3 in)
- Position: Centre-back

Team information
- Current team: Neftekhimik Nizhnekamsk
- Number: 44

Youth career
- Krasnodar

Senior career*
Years	Team	Apps	(Gls)
2022–2024	Krasnodar-2	39	(0)
2022–2025	Krasnodar	2	(0)
2023	→ Alania Vladikavkaz (loan)	8	(0)
2024–2025	→ Tyumen (loan)	11	(0)
2025	→ Amkar Perm (loan)	12	(0)
2025–2026	Amkar Perm	29	(3)
2026–	Neftekhimik Nizhnekamsk	0	(0)

International career^{‡}
2021	Russia U18	2	(0)
- * Club domestic league appearances and goals as of 14 June 2026 ‡ National team caps and goals as of 29 March 2021

Mikhail Yuryevich Sukhoruchenko (Russian: Михаил Юрьевич Сухорученко; born 13 April 2003) is a Russian football player who plays for Neftekhimik Nizhnekamsk.

== Club career ==
Sukhoruchenko made his debut in the Russian Football National League for Krasnodar-2 on 8 March 2022 in a game against. Baltika Kaliningrad.

He made his Russian Premier League debut for Krasnodar on 8 May 2022 against Arsenal Tula.

On 22 July 2023, Sukhoruchenko joined Alania Vladikavkaz on a season-long loan with an option to buy.

On 25 June 2024, Sukhoruchenko moved on loan to Tyumen. On 13 February 2025, he was loaned by Amkar Perm.

== Career statistics ==
As of 27 November 2022

Club	Season	League			Cup		Continental		Total	
Club	Season	Division	Apps	Goals	Apps	Goals	Apps	Goals	Apps	Goals
Krasnodar-2	2021–22	First League	11	0	–		–		11	0
Krasnodar-2	2022–23	First League	16	0	–		–		16	0
Krasnodar-2	Total		27	0	0	0	0	0	27	0
Krasnodar	2021–22	RPL	1	0	0	0	–		1	0
Krasnodar	2022–23	RPL	0	0	0	0	–		0	0
Krasnodar	Total		1	0	0	0	0	0	1	0
Career total			28	0	0	0	0	0	28	0
