= Oleg Oznobikhin =

Russian footballer

Personal information
- Full name: Oleg Vsevolodovich Oznobikhin
- Date of birth: 19 February 2002 (age 24)
- Place of birth: Vladivostok, Russia
- Height: 1.76 m (5 ft 9 in)
- Position: Forward

Team information
- Current team: Zarya Lugansk
- Number: 70

Youth career
- Krasnodar-2

Senior career*
Years	Team	Apps	(Gls)
2022–2023	Krasnodar-2	25	(3)
2023–2025	Ufa	9	(0)
2024	→ Dynamo Kirov (loan)	18	(2)
2026–	Zarya Lugansk	12	(1)

International career^{‡}
2019	Russia U17	5	(3)
- * Club domestic league appearances and goals as of 31 October 2026 ‡ National team caps and goals as of 26 March 2019

Oleg Vsevolodovich Oznobikhin (Russian: Олег Всеволодович Ознобихин; born 19 February 2002) is a Russian football player who plays for Zarya Lugansk.

== Club career ==
He made his debut in the Russian Football National League for Krasnodar-2 on 8 March 2022 in a game against Baltika Kaliningrad.

On 5 July 2023, Oznobikhin signed with Ufa.
