= Aleksandr Ektov =

Russian football player

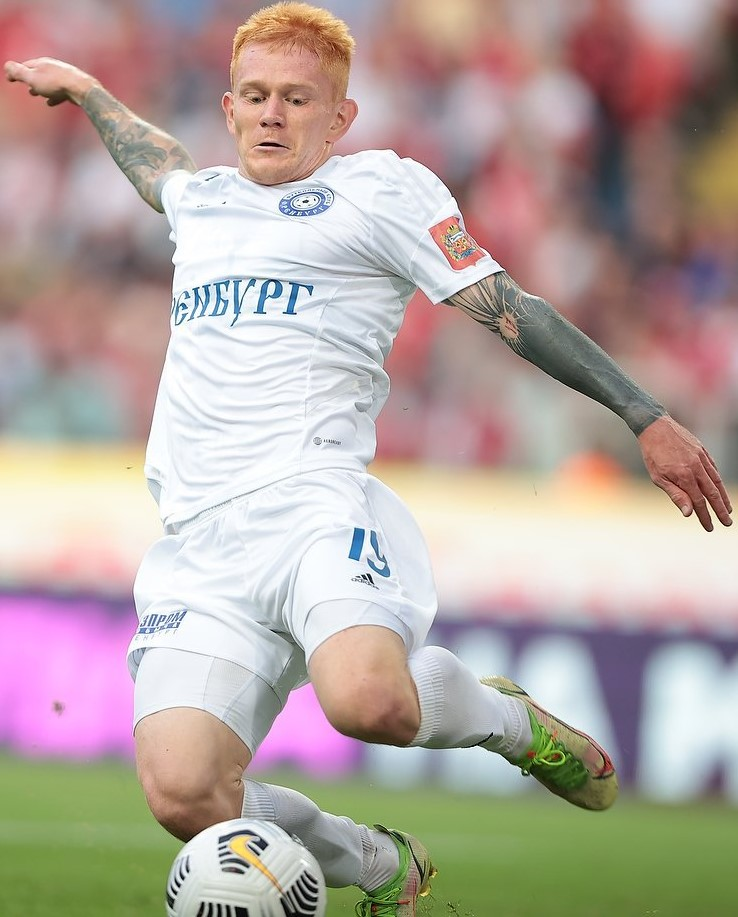
- Ektov with Orenburg in 2022

Personal information
- Full name: Aleksandr Yuryevich Ektov
- Date of birth: 30 January 1996 (age 30)
- Place of birth: Volokolamsk, Russia
- Height: 1.73 m (5 ft 8 in)
- Positions: Right-back; left-back

Team information
- Current team: Nizhny Novgorod
- Number: 15

Youth career
- 2005–2007: DYuSSh Volokolamsk
- 2008–2015: Master-Saturn
- 2015–2016: CSKA Moscow

Senior career*
Years	Team	Apps	(Gls)
2016–2019	Dolgoprudny	69	(9)
2019–2020	Shinnik Yaroslavl	27	(2)
2020–2023	Orenburg	90	(7)
2023–2025	Krasnodar	13	(0)
2024–2025	→ Pari Nizhny Novgorod (loan)	23	(1)
2025–	Nizhny Novgorod	0	(0)
- * Club domestic league appearances and goals as of 30 June 2025

Aleksandr Yuryevich Ektov (Russian: Александр Юрьевич Эктов; born 30 January 1996) is a Russian football player who plays for Nizhny Novgorod. He is deployed in multiple positions, as a full-back or wide midfielder (both on right and left flank).

== Club career ==
He made his debut in the Russian Professional Football League for Dolgoprudny on 20 July 2016 in a game against Solyaris Moscow.

He made his Russian Football National League debut for Shinnik Yaroslavl on 7 July 2019 in a game against SKA-Khabarovsk.

Ektov made his Russian Premier League debut for Orenburg on 16 July 2022 against Krylia Sovetov Samara.

On 7 June 2023, Krasnodar announced Ektov's transfer.

On 7 August 2024, Ektov moved to Pari Nizhny Novgorod on loan with an option to buy. He missed the 2025–26 season recovering from knee surgeries.

== Career statistics ==
As of 31 May 2025

Appearances and goals by club, season and competition
Club	Season	League			Cup		Other		Total	
Club	Season	Division	Apps	Goals	Apps	Goals	Apps	Goals	Apps	Goals
Dolgoprudny	2016–17	Second League	25	5	3	0	—		28	5
Dolgoprudny	2017–18	Second League	23	2	1	0	—		24	2
Dolgoprudny	2018–19	Second League	21	2	1	0	—		22	2
Dolgoprudny	Total		69	9	5	0	0	0	74	9
Shinnik Yaroslavl	2019–20	First League	26	2	4	1	4 (Note: Appearances in the FNL Cup)	1	34	4
Shinnik Yaroslavl	2020–21	First League	1	0	—		—		1	0
Shinnik Yaroslavl	Total		27	2	4	1	4	1	35	4
Orenburg	2020–21	First League	32	3	0	0	—		32	3
Orenburg	2021–22	First League	33	1	2	1	2 (Note: Appearances in the promotion play-offs)	0	37	2
Orenburg	2022–23	Russian Premier League	25	3	6	0	—		31	3
Orenburg	Total		90	7	8	1	2	0	100	8
Krasnodar	2023–24	Russian Premier League	12	0	6	0	—		18	0
Krasnodar	2024–25	Russian Premier League	1	0	2	0	1 (Note: Appearance in Russian Super Cup)	0	4	0
Krasnodar	Total		13	0	8	0	1	0	22	0
Nizhny Novgorod (loan)	2024–25	Russian Premier League	23	1	1	0	2 (Note: Appearances in the relegation play-offs)	0	26	1
Nizhny Novgorod	2025–26	Russian Premier League	0	0	0	0	—		0	0
Career total			222	19	26	2	9	1	257	22

== Honours ==
Krasnodar

- Russian Premier League: 2024–25
