= 2023–24 FC Baltika Kaliningrad season =

FC Baltika Kaliningrad
2023–24 season
- Manager: Sergei Ignashevich
- Stadium: Kaliningrad Stadium
- Premier League: 15th (Relegated)
- Russian Cup: Runners Up
- Top goalscorer: League: Ángelo Henríquez (6); All: Ángelo Henríquez (9)
- Highest home attendance: 16,929 vs Zenit St.Petersburg (4 November 2023)
- Lowest home attendance: 5,702 vs Lokomotiv Moscow (28 November 2023)
- Average home league attendance: 11,241 (25 May 2024)

The 2023–24 season was FC Baltika Kaliningrad's 70th season in existence, 4th season in the Russian Premier League, and first since 1998. They also competed in the Russian Cup, where they reached the Final, before defeat to Zenit St.Petersburg.

== Season events ==
As of match played 2 June 2024

No.	Name	Nationality	Position	Date of birth (age)	Signed from	Signed in	Contract ends	Apps.	Goals
Goalkeepers
1	Yevgeni Latyshonok	(Russia)	GK	21 June 1998 (aged 25)	Krasnodar	2019		115	0
23	Ivan Konovalov	(Russia)	GK	18 August 1994 (aged 29)	Unattached	2024	2024	0	0
35	Soslan Dzhanayev	(Russia)	GK	13 March 1987 (aged 37)	Sochi	2023		4	0
67	Maksim Borisko	(Russia)	GK	15 February 2000 (aged 24)	Urozhay Krasnodar	2019		58	0
Defenders
2	Aleksandr Zhirov	(Russia)	DF	24 January 1991 (aged 33)	SV Sandhausen	2023		28	0
3	Kirill Malyarov	(Russia)	DF	7 March 1997 (aged 27)	Shakhter Karagandy	2022		61	2
4	Nathan Gassama	(France)	DF	5 January 2001 (aged 23)	Slavia Sofia	2023		22	1
5	Aleksandr Osipov	(Russia)	DF	21 October 1998 (aged 25)	Veles Moscow	2022		72	1
7	Roberto Fernández	(Bolivia)	DF	18 August 1994 (aged 29)	on loan from Bolívar	2023	2024	40	2
13	Diego Luna	(Venezuela)	DF	2 January 2000 (aged 24)	Caracas	2024	2027	17	0
16	Kevin Andrade	(Colombia)	DF	16 June 1999 (aged 24)	América de Cali	2024	2027	18	1
23	Ivan Ostojić	(Serbia)	DF	26 June 1989 (aged 34)	Javor Ivanjica	2021		82	6
26	Nikola Radmanovac	(Serbia)	DF	30 January 1997 (aged 27)	Radnik Surdulica	2022		64	1
Midfielders
6	Maksim Kuzmin	(Russia)	MF	1 June 1996 (aged 28)	Dynamo Moscow	2019		175	8
8	Kirill Kaplenko	(Belarus)	MF	15 June 1999 (aged 24)	Orenburg	2024	2028	16	2
11	Yury Kavalyow	(Belarus)	MF	27 January 1993 (aged 31)	Orenburg	2024	2024 (+1)	17	1
17	Kristijan Bistrović	(Croatia)	MF	9 April 1998 (aged 26)	on loan from CSKA Moscow	2023	2024	31	3
19	Sergei Pryakhin	(Russia)	MF	16 December 2002 (aged 21)	CSKA Moscow	2023		53	5
24	Dmitri Rybchinsky	(Russia)	MF	19 August 1998 (aged 25)	Lokomotiv Moscow	2024		17	1
59	Tigran Avanesyan	(Armenia)	MF	13 April 2002 (aged 22)	CSKA Moscow	2023		26	2
80	Yaroslav Arbuzov	(Russia)	MF	12 January 2004 (aged 20)	CSKA Moscow	2024		0	0
89	Vladislav Lazarev	(Russia)	MF	13 November 2001 (aged 22)	CSKA Moscow	2017		75	13
Forwards
9	Gedeon Guzina	(Bosnia and Herzegovina)	FW	26 December 1993 (aged 30)	NK Radomlje	2022		57	17
10	Joel Fameyeh	(Ghana)	FW	14 May 1997 (aged 27)	on loan from Rubin Kazan	2024	2024	4	1
18	Ángelo Henríquez	(Chile)	FW	13 April 1994 (aged 30)	Miedź Legnica	2023	2025	38	9
25	Alex Fernandes	(Brazil)	FW	3 June 2002 (aged 21)	Cherno More	2024	2027	18	5
77	Danila Kozlov	(Russia)	FW	19 January 2005 (aged 19)	Zenit St.Petersburg	2024	2028	15	3
88	Vitaly Lisakovich	(Belarus)	FW	8 February 1998 (aged 26)	on loan from Rubin Kazan	2024	2024	18	4
Away on loan
66	João Lameira	(Portugal)	MF	19 April 1999 (aged 25)	Torreense	2023	2026	6	0
Players that left Baltika Kaliningrad during the season
8	Aslan Dudiyev	(Russia)	DF	15 June 1990 (aged 33)	Rotor Volgograd	2022		104	5
10	Yan Kazayev	(Russia)	MF	26 November 1991 (aged 32)	Sochi	2019		125	21
11	Dmitry Barkov	(Russia)	FW	19 June 1992 (aged 31)	SKA-Khabarovsk	2022		27	3
13	Guillermo Soto	(Chile)	DF	19 January 1994 (aged 30)	Huracán	2023		13	0
20	Artur Galoyan	(Armenia)	MF	25 June 1999 (aged 24)	Torreense	2023		23	1
22	Tamerlan Musayev	(Russia)	FW	29 July 2001 (aged 22)	Arsenal Tula	2020		80	19
23	Aleksandr Putsko	(Russia)	DF	24 February 1993 (aged 31)	Akhmat Grozny	2022		28	0

== Transfers ==
=== In ===
Date	Position	Nationality	Name	From	Fee	Ref.
13 January 2024	MF	(Russia)	Yaroslav Arbuzov	CSKA Moscow	Undisclosed	
17 January 2024	DF	(Colombia)	Kevin Andrade	América de Cali	Undisclosed	
30 January 2024	GK	(Russia)	Ivan Konovalov	Unattached	Free	
31 January 2024	MF	(Russia)	Danila Kozlov	Zenit St.Petersburg	Undisclosed	
7 February 2024	MF	(Belarus)	Yury Kavalyow	Orenburg	Undisclosed	
9 February 2024	MF	(Belarus)	Kirill Kaplenko	Orenburg	Undisclosed	
20 February 2024	MF	(Russia)	Dmitri Rybchinsky	Lokomotiv Moscow	Undisclosed	
21 February 2024	FW	(Brazil)	Alex Fernandes	Cherno More Varna	Undisclosed	

=== Loans in ===
Date from	Position	Nationality	Name	From	Date to	Ref.
13 January 2024	FW	(Belarus)	Vitaly Lisakovich	Rubin Kazan	End of season	
8 February 2024	FW	(Ghana)	Joel Fameyeh	Rubin Kazan	End of season	

=== Loans out ===
Date from	Position	Nationality	Name	To	Date to	Ref.
14 January 2024	GK	(Russia)	Aleksandr Koryakin	Rodina Moscow	End of season	
16 January 2024	MF	(Portugal)	João Lameira	Oțelul Galați	End of season	

=== Released ===
Date	Position	Nationality	Name	Joined	Date	Ref.
12 January 2024	DF	(Russia)	Aleksandr Putsko	Urartu	19 January 2024	

== Friendlies ==
6 July 2023	Lokomotiv Moscow	0 – 1	Baltika Kaliningrad	Moscow
16:00 KALT (UTC+2)			Barkov 53'	Stadium: RZD Arena

== Competitions ==
=== Overall record ===
Competition	First match	Last match	Starting round	Final position	Record							
Competition	First match	Last match	Starting round	Final position	Pld	W	D	L	GF	GA	GD	Win %
Premier League	23 July 2023	25 May 2024	Matchday 1	15th	30	7	5	18	33	42	−9	23.33
Russian Cup	26 July 2023	2 June 2024	Group stage	Runners-up	13	6	2	5	18	15	+3	46.15
Total					43	13	7	23	51	57	−6	30.23

Last updated: 2 June 2024
Source: Soccerway

=== Premier League ===
==== League table ====
Pos	Team	Pld	W	D	L	GF	GA	GD	Pts	Qualification or relegation
12	Orenburg	30	7	10	13	34	41	−7	31	
13	Pari Nizhny Novgorod (O)	30	8	6	16	29	51	−22	30 (Note: Pari NN is ahead of Ural on head-to-head points: Pari NN 4, Ural 1.)	Qualification to relegation play-offs
14	Ural Yekaterinburg (R)	30	7	9	14	30	46	−16	30	Qualification to relegation play-offs
15	Baltika Kaliningrad (R)	30	7	5	18	33	42	−9	26	Relegation to First League
16	Sochi (R)	30	5	9	16	37	48	−11	24	Relegation to First League

Source: Premier Liga
Rules for classification: 1) Points; 2) Head-to-head points; 3) Head-to-head matches won; 4) Head-to-head goal difference; 5) Head-to-head goals scored; 6) Matches won; 7) Goal difference; 8) Goals scored; 9) 2022–23 position (not applicable to final standings); 10) Play-off. Note: if teams tied on points played an equal number of head-to-head games, head-to-head results are considered in aggregate, in a separate 'table'. If teams tied on points played a different number of head-to-head games, head-to-head criteria are considered in one-on-one pairs for each team against each other, then the teams are ordered by the number of one-on-one matchups they have advantage in.
(O) Play-off winners; (R) Relegated

==== Results summary ====
Overall								Home						Away					
Pld	W	D	L	GF	GA	GD	Pts	W	D	L	GF	GA	GD	W	D	L	GF	GA	GD
30	7	5	18	33	42	−9	26	6	3	6	18	19	−1	1	2	12	15	23	−8

Last updated: 25 May 2024.

==== Results by round ====
Round	1	2	3	4	5	6	7	8	9	10	11	12	13	14	15	16	17	18	19	20	22	23	24	25	21^{1}	26	27	28	29	30
Ground	A	A	H	A	H	A	A	H	H	A	H	H	A	H	A	H	A	H	H	A	H	A	A	H	A	H	A	H	A	H
Result	L	L	W	L	L	L	L	D	W	L	W	D	L	L	D	L	D	L	D	L	W	L	W	W	L	W	L	L	L	L
Position	16	15	12	13	14	15	16	16	14	15	13	14	15	15	14	15	15	15	15	15	15	15	14	14	15	13	15	15	15	15

Updated to match(es) played on 25 May 2024. Source: See Results
A = Away; H = Home; W = Win; D = Draw; L = Loss

==== Matches ====
The league fixtures were unveiled on 24 June 2023.

23 July 2023 1	Sochi	2 – 0	Baltika Kaliningrad	Sochi
19:00 KALT (UTC+2)	Kramarič 6'; Drkušić 83'; Yusupov (yellow card) 87'	Report	Kuzmin (yellow card) 77'	Stadium: Fisht Olympic Stadium; Attendance: 4,535; Referee: Rafael Shafeev

31 July 2023 2	Spartak Moscow	2 – 1	Baltika Kaliningrad	Moscow
19:30 KALT (UTC+2)	Bongonda 43'; Umyarov (yellow card) 61'; Promes 84'; Martins (yellow card) 90+'	Report	Radmanovac (yellow card) 78'; Henríquez 90'	Stadium: Otkritie Arena; Attendance: 10,992; Referee: Pavel Kukuyan

6 August 2023 3	Baltika Kaliningrad	2 – 1	Fakel Voronezh	Kaliningrad
16:30 KALT (UTC+2)	Cherov 2' (o.g.); Musayev 48' (yellow card) 81'; Latyshonok (yellow card) 90+'	Report	Yakimov 14'; Bryzgalov (yellow card) 34'; Bozhin (yellow card) 79'; Kvekveskiri (yellow card) 90+'	Stadium: Kaliningrad Stadium; Attendance: 11,615; Referee: Alexey Sukhoi

13 August 2023 4	Dynamo Moscow	2 – 0	Baltika Kaliningrad	Moscow
14:00 KALT (UTC+2)	Bessmertniy 55'; Makarov 75'; Gladyshev (yellow card) 89'	Report		Stadium: VTB Arena; Attendance: 7,684; Referee: Vladimir Moskalyov

19 August 2023 5	Baltika Kaliningrad	0 – 1	Ural Yekaterinburg	Kaliningrad
16:30 KALT (UTC+2)	Pryakhin (yellow card) 89'	Report	Kashtanov 49' (pen.)	Stadium: Kaliningrad Stadium; Attendance: 9,687; Referee: Vasily Kazartsev

27 August 2023 6	Krylia Sovetov	2 – 1	Baltika Kaliningrad	Samara
16:30 KALT (UTC+2)	Soldatenkov (yellow card) 45'; Babkin 52'; Barać (yellow card) 80'; Fernando (yellow card) 85'; Zotov 90+'	Report	Musayev 89'; Dudiyev (yellow card) 90'	Stadium: Solidarnost Samara Arena; Attendance: 6,890; Referee: Sergey Ivanov

3 September 2023 7	Lokomotiv Moscow	3 – 2	Baltika Kaliningrad	Moscow
14:15 KALT (UTC+2)	Dzyuba 9'; Karpukas (yellow card) 15'; Miranchuk 17'; Barinov 34'	Report	Radmanovac (yellow card) 20'; Guzina 50'; Pryakhin 65'	Stadium: RZD Arena; Attendance: 7,652; Referee: Artem Lyubimov

16 September 2023 8	Baltika Kaliningrad	2 – 2	Rostov	Kaliningrad
20:15 KALT (UTC+2)	Guzina (yellow card) 62'; Henríquez 86'; Bistrović 90+'	Report	Utkin 16'; Golenkov 43'; Bayramyan (yellow card) 61'	Stadium: Kaliningrad Stadium; Attendance: 11,712; Referee: Evgeny Turbin

23 September 2023 9	Baltika Kaliningrad	1 – 0	Akhmat Grozny	Kaliningrad
16:30 KALT (UTC+2)	Kharin 43' (o.g.); Malyarov (yellow card) 51'	Report		Stadium: Kaliningrad Stadium; Attendance: 9,113; Referee: Pavel Shadykhanov

30 September 2023 10	CSKA Moscow	1 – 0	Baltika Kaliningrad	Moscow
19:00 KALT (UTC+2)	Dávila 18'; Fayzullaev (yellow card) 70'	Report	Ostojić (yellow card) 30'; Gassama (yellow card) 68'	Stadium: VEB Arena; Attendance: 8,135; Referee: Yan Bobrovskiy

7 October 2023 11	Baltika Kaliningrad	1 – 0	Orenburg	Kaliningrad
15:30 KALT (UTC+2)	Guzina 23'; Bistrović (yellow card) 83'	Report	Vorobyov (yellow card) 26'; Pérez (yellow card) 77'	Stadium: Kaliningrad Stadium; Attendance: 7,971; Referee: Sergey Tsyganok

21 October 2023 12	Baltika Kaliningrad	2 – 2	Krasnodar	Kaliningrad
17:00 KALT (UTC+2)	Ostojić (yellow card) 22'; Kuzmin 23'; Henríquez 36'; Soto (yellow card) 45'; Guzina (yellow card) 56'	Report	Córdoba 17'; Batxi (yellow card) 45'; Spertsyan 61' (pen.)	Stadium: Kaliningrad Stadium; Attendance: 10,270; Referee: Evgeniy Kukulyak

27 October 2023 13	Rubin Kazan	1 – 0	Baltika Kaliningrad	Kazan
18:00 KALT (UTC+2)	Kabutov (yellow card) 44'; Vada 88'	Report	Gassama (yellow card) 9'; Radmanovac (yellow card) 54'; Soto (yellow card) 89'; Guzina (yellow card) 90+2'	Stadium: Ak Bars Arena; Attendance: 2,832; Referee: Yan Bobrovskiy

4 November 2023 14	Baltika Kaliningrad	0 – 2	Zenit St.Petersburg	Kaliningrad
18:00 KALT (UTC+2)		Report	Sergeev 63'; Cassierra 77'	Stadium: Kaliningrad Stadium; Attendance: 16,929; Referee: Aleksey Sukhoy

12 November 2023 15	Pari NN	0 – 0	Baltika Kaliningrad	Nizhny Novgorod
13:00 KALT (UTC+2)	Troshechkin (yellow card) 73'	Report	Kuzmin (yellow card) 29'; Malyarov (yellow card) 70'	Stadium: Nizhny Novgorod Stadium; Attendance: 5,921; Referee: Sergey Cheban

25 November 2023 16	Baltika Kaliningrad	0 – 2	Spartak Moscow	Kaliningrad
19:45 KALT (UTC+2)	Soto (yellow card) 52'	Report	Khlusevich 32'; Medina (yellow card) 39'; Babić (yellow card) 80'; Promes 88'	Stadium: Kaliningrad Stadium; Attendance: 16,267; Referee: Rafael Shafeev

2 December 2023 17	Fakel Voronezh	0 – 0	Baltika Kaliningrad	Voronezh
13:00 KALT (UTC+2)	Alshin (yellow card) 37'	Report	Gassama (yellow card) 36'; Soto (yellow card) 69'; Guzina (yellow card) 83'	Stadium: Tsentralnyi Profsoyuz Stadion; Attendance: 8,279; Referee: Evgeniy Bulanov

10 December 2023 18	Baltika Kaliningrad	0 – 1	Rubin Kazan	Kaliningrad
18:45 KALT (UTC+2)	Radmanovac (yellow card) 18'; Kuzmin (yellow card) 23'	Report	Daku 7'; Gritsayenko (yellow card) 37'	Stadium: Kaliningrad Stadium; Attendance: 6,099; Referee: Vladislav Bezborodov

3 March 2024 19	Baltika Kaliningrad	0 – 0	Sochi	Kaliningrad
18:00 KALT (UTC+2)	Bistrović (yellow card) 39'; Luna (yellow card) 55'; Lisakovich (yellow card) 79'	Report	Saavedra (yellow card) 6'; Kramarič (yellow card) 89'	Stadium: Kaliningrad Stadium; Attendance: 10,701; Referee: Rafael Shafeev

10 March 2024 20	Orenburg	1 – 0	Baltika Kaliningrad	Orenburg
13:00 KALT (UTC+2)	Pérez (yellow card) 16'; Vorobyov (penalty missed) 73'; Marín 80'	Report	Kaplenko (yellow card) 45+'	Stadium: Gazovik Stadium; Attendance: 2,717; Referee: Vladimir Moskalyov

30 March 2024 22	Baltika Kaliningrad	2 – 0	Pari NN	Kaliningrad
16:30 KALT (UTC+2)	Fernandes (yellow card) 12'; Fameyeh 40'; Lisakovich 43'; Bistrović (yellow card) 90'	Report	Stotsky (yellow card) 22'; Shnaptsev (yellow card) 33'; Tikhy (yellow card) 69'; Gotsuk (red card) 85'; Kakkoyev (yellow card) 86'	Stadium: Kaliningrad Stadium; Attendance: 7,275; Referee: Evgeniy Kukulyak

7 April 2024 23	Zenit St.Petersburg	1 – 0	Baltika Kaliningrad	Saint Petersburg
15:30 KALT (UTC+2)	Pedro 42'; Wendel (yellow card) 45+1'	Report		Stadium: Krestovsky Stadium; Attendance: 21,798; Referee: Aleksei Sukhoy

13 April 2024 24	Akhmat Grozny	1 – 7	Baltika Kaliningrad	Grozny
16:30 KALT (UTC+2)	Timofeyev (yellow card) 13'; Kamilov (yellow card) 68'; Kovachev 75'	Report	Henríquez 4'; Fernandes 7', 41', 84'; Kavalyow 10'; Lisakovich 34'; Luna (yellow card) 86'; Kuzmin 89'	Stadium: Akhmat-Arena; Attendance: 4,416; Referee: Vladimir Moskalyov

20 April 2024 25	Baltika Kaliningrad	2 – 1	Krylia Sovetov	Kaliningrad
15:30 KALT (UTC+2)	Fernández (yellow card) 66'; Zhirov (yellow card) 77'; Henríquez 84'; Radmanovac (yellow card) 90+'; Rybchinsky 90+'	Report	Pyachenin (yellow card) 34'; Lomayev (yellow card) 83'; Rahmanović 90+' (pen.)	Stadium: Kaliningrad Stadium; Attendance: 7,400; Referee: Sergey Cheban

24 April 2024 21	Krasnodar	3 – 2	Baltika Kaliningrad	Krasnodar
19:30 KALT (UTC+2)	Córdoba 31', 60'; Spertsyan 50'; Olusegun (yellow card) 81'	Report	Lisakovich (yellow card) 42'; Kuzmin (yellow card) 55'; Kozlov 57', 89'	Stadium: Krasnodar Stadium; Attendance: 14,683; Referee: Pavel Kukuyan

28 April 2024 26	Baltika Kaliningrad	3 – 1	CSKA Moscow	Kaliningrad
21:30 KALT (UTC+2)	Andrade (yellow card) 40'; Bistrović 51' (pen.); Rybchinsky (yellow card) 60'; Fernandes 76'; Kaplenko 85'; Gassama (yellow card) 89'; Latyshonok (yellow card) 90+2'	Report	Musayev (yellow card) 54'; Gajić (yellow card) 61'; Glebov (yellow card) 83' (goal) 90+2'	Stadium: Kaliningrad Stadium; Attendance: 14,046; Referee: Yan Bobrovsky

6 May 2024 27	Ural Yekaterinburg	2 – 1	Baltika Kaliningrad	Yekaterinburg
14:45 KALT (UTC+2)	Kashtanov 19' (pen.); Ionov (yellow card) 77' (goal) 90+'	Report	Lisakovich 1'; Andrade (yellow card) FT	Stadium: Central Stadium; Attendance: 5,205; Referee: Sergey Ivanov

11 May 2024 28	Baltika Kaliningrad	2 – 3	Dynamo Moscow	Kaliningrad
19:30 KALT (UTC+2)	Henriquez 32'; Kaplenko 68'	Report	Tyukavin 3'; Skopintsev (yellow card) 57'; Ngamaelu (yellow card) 71', (goal) 90+9'; Laxalt (yellow card) 81'; Fomin (yellow card) 87'; Fernández 90+3'	Stadium: Kaliningrad Stadium; Attendance: 13,478; Referee: Yevgeni Bulanov

19 May 2024 29	Rostov	2 – 1	Baltika Kaliningrad	Rostov-on-Don
15:30 KALT (UTC+2)	Shchetinin 33'; Ronaldo 36'; Langovich (yellow card) 47'; Sako (yellow card) 82'; Koltakov (yellow card) 89'	Report	Fernandes (yellow card) 3'; Fernández (yellow card) 35' (goal) 45+'; Kozlov (yellow card) 57'; Andrade (yellow card) 72'; Osipov (yellow card) 88'	Stadium: Rostov Arena; Attendance: 12,455; Referee: Kirill Levnikov

25 May 2024 30	Baltika Kaliningrad	1 – 3	Lokomotiv Moscow	Kaliningrad
15:30 KALT (UTC+2)	Henríquez (yellow card) 12' (goal) 76' (pen.); Andrade (yellow card) 35'; Luna (yellow card) 40'; Fernandes (yellow card) 90+'	Report	Miranchuk 8'; Barinov (yellow card) 43'; Morozov (yellow card) 54'; Karpukas 66'; Suleymanov 88'	Stadium: Kaliningrad Stadium; Attendance: 16,054; Referee: Vladislav Bezborodov

=== Russian Cup ===
==== Group stage ====
Pos	Team	Pld	W	PW	PL	L	GF	GA	GD	Pts	Qualification
1	Zenit Saint Petersburg	6	4	1	0	1	9	5	+4	14	Qualification to the Knockout phase (RPL path)
2	Baltika Kaliningrad	6	4	0	0	2	12	7	+5	12	Qualification to the Knockout phase (RPL path)
3	Akhmat Grozny	6	2	0	1	3	10	12	−2	7	Qualification to the Knockout phase (regions path)
4	Krylia Sovetov Samara	6	1	0	0	5	5	12	−7	3	

Source: Russian Football Union (in Russian), Soccerway
Rules for classification: 1) Points; 2) Head-to-head points; 3) Head-to-head matches won; 4) Head-to-head goal difference; 5) Head-to-head goals scored; 6) Matches won; 7) Goal difference; 8) Goals scored; 9) Penalty shoot-out goal difference; 10) Draw.

26 July 2023 1	Krylia Sovetov	2 – 3	Baltika Kaliningrad	Samara
17:30 KALT (UTC+2)	Khubulov 10'; Bijl 89'	Report	Ostojić (yellow card) 7'; Fernández 56'; Henríquez 67'; Kuzmin 74'	Stadium: Solidarnost Samara Arena; Attendance: 8,021; Referee: Roman Safyan

10 August 2023 2	Akhmat Grozny	0 – 2	Baltika Kaliningrad	Grozny
19:00 KALT (UTC+2)	Timofeyev (yellow card) 65'	Report	Semyonov 44' (o.g.); Lameira (yellow card) 52'; Barkov 63'; Osipov (yellow card) 83'	Stadium: Akhmat Arena; Attendance: 3,567; Referee: Artur Fyodorov

30 August 2023 3	Baltika Kaliningrad	1 – 0	Zenit St.Petersburg	Kaliningrad
18:30 KALT (UTC+2)	Henríquez 42'; Latyshonok (yellow card) 84'; Guzina (yellow card) 90+4'	Report	Wendel (yellow card) 90+3'; Claudinho (yellow card) 90+4'	Stadium: Kaliningrad Stadium; Attendance: 27,961; Referee: Sergey Tsyganok

19 September 2023 4	Baltika Kaliningrad	1 – 2	Krylia Sovetov	Kaliningrad
16:15 KALT (UTC+2)	Galoyan 90+1' (pen.)	Report	Soldatenkov (yellow card) 3'; Pisarsky 38'; Bijl (yellow card) 40+1'; Rahmanović 55'; Saltykov (yellow card) 75'	Stadium: Kaliningrad Stadium; Attendance: 6,983; Referee: Vera Opeykina

3 October 2023 5	Zenit St.Petersburg	2 – 1	Baltika Kaliningrad	Saint Petersburg
18:15 KALT (UTC+2)	Sergeev 18'; Queiroz 64'	Report	Bistrović 24'; Musaev (yellow card) 90+2'	Stadium: Krestovsky Stadium; Attendance: 13,700; Referee: Aleksey Sukhoy

31 October 2023 6	Baltika Kaliningrad	4 – 1	Akhmat Grozny	Kaliningrad
20:30 KALT (UTC+2)	Henríquez 45'; Musayev 48', 79'; Gassama (yellow card) 60'; Fernández (yellow card) 69'; Guzina 90+3'	Report	Shvets 33'; Kamilov (yellow card) 49'; Agalarov (yellow card) 60'; Volkov (yellow card) 60'	Stadium: Kaliningrad Stadium; Attendance: 7,112; Referee: Artyom Lyubimov

==== Knockout stage ====
28 November 2023 RPL path Quarter-finals 1st leg	Baltika Kaliningrad	2 – 2	Lokomotiv Moscow	Kaliningrad
17:15 KALT (UTC+2)	Malyarov (yellow card) 49'; Avanesyan 65'; Gassama 70'; Musaev (yellow card) 83'	Report	Suleymanov 16', 90+3'; Nenakhov (yellow card) 78'	Stadium: Kaliningrad Stadium; Attendance: 5,702; Referee: Sergey Cheban

14 March 2024 RPL path Quarter-finals 2nd leg	Lokomotiv Moscow	1 – 1 (3 – 3 agg.) (7 – 8 p)	Baltika Kaliningrad	Moscow
17:00 KALT (UTC+2)	Tiknizyan 3'; Nyamsi (yellow card) 59'; Samoshnikov (yellow card) 66'; Morozov (yellow card) 83'	Report	Kozlov 53'; Luna (yellow card) 90+1'	Stadium: RZD Arena; Attendance: 5,702; Referee: Sergey Cheban
	Penalties
	Miranchuk (penalty scored); Suleymanov (penalty scored); Barinov (penalty scored); Nenakhov (penalty scored); Dzyuba (penalty missed); Nyamsi (penalty scored); Morozov (penalty scored); Pinyaev (penalty missed)		Zhirov (penalty scored); Kaplenko (penalty missed); Bistrović (penalty scored); Kuzmin (penalty scored); Fameyeh (penalty scored); Andrade (penalty scored); Kozlov (penalty scored); Luna (penalty scored)

3 April 2024 RPL path Semi-finals 1st leg	Baltika Kaliningrad	0 – 1	CSKA Moscow	Kaliningrad
18:15 KALT (UTC+2)	Luna (yellow card) 45+1'; Andrade (yellow card) 60'	Report	Dávila 39'	Stadium: Kaliningrad Stadium; Attendance: 14,328; Referee: Sergey Ivanov

16 April 2024 RPL path Semi-finals 2nd leg	CSKA Moscow	2 – 0 (3 – 0 agg.)	Baltika Kaliningrad	Moscow
19:30 KALT (UTC+2)	Chalov 34' (pen.); Fayzullaev 36'; Lukin (yellow card) 74'	Report		Stadium: VEB Arena; Attendance: 16,300; Referee: Yan Bobrovsky

2 May 2024 Regions path Semi-finals Stage 2	Rostov	0 – 1	Baltika Kaliningrad	Rostov-on-Don
18:15 KALT (UTC+2)	Aznaurov (yellow card) 27'	Report	Avanesyan 4'; Radmanovac (yellow card) 29'; Latyshonok (yellow card) 90+7'	Stadium: Rostov Arena; Attendance: 15,708; Referee: Kirill Levnikov

14 May 2024 Regions Final	Baltika Kaliningrad	1 – 0	Spartak Moscow	Kaliningrad
20:45 KALT (UTC+2)	Andrade 4'; Kaplenko (yellow card) 18'; Fernandes (yellow card) 90+6'	Report	Litvinov (yellow card) 15'	Stadium: Kaliningrad Stadium; Attendance: 26,717; Referee: Vladislav Bezborodov

2 June 2024 Final	Baltika Kaliningrad	1 – 2	Zenit St.Petersburg	Moscow
17:00 KALT (UTC+2)	Fernandes 40'	Report	Yerokhin (yellow card) 69'; Claudinho (yellow card) 77'; Nino 81'; Alip 90+5'	Stadium: Luzhniki Stadium; Attendance: 41,776; Referee: Sergei Karasev

== Squad statistics ==
As of match played 2 June 2024

=== Appearances and goals ===
No.	Pos	Nat	Player	Total		Premier League		Russian Cup	
No.	Pos	Nat	Player	Apps	Goals	Apps	Goals	Apps	Goals
1	GK	(Russia) RUS	Yevgeni Latyshonok	34	0	26	0	8	0
2	DF	(Russia) RUS	Aleksandr Zhirov	28	0	19	0	6+3	0
3	DF	(Russia) RUS	Kirill Malyarov	28	0	11+9	0	4+4	0
4	DF	(France) FRA	Nathan Gassama	22	1	14+1	0	5+2	1
5	DF	(Russia) RUS	Aleksandr Osipov	27	0	13+6	0	7+1	0
6	MF	(Russia) RUS	Maksim Kuzmin	36	3	14+12	2	5+5	1
7	DF	(Bolivia) BOL	Roberto Fernández	40	2	27+2	1	4+7	1
8	MF	(Belarus) BLR	Kirill Kaplenko	16	2	5+6	2	5	0
9	FW	(Bosnia and Herzegovina) BIH	Gedeon Guzina	24	3	16+2	2	3+3	1
10	FW	(Ghana) GHA	Joel Fameyeh	4	1	3	1	0+1	0
11	MF	(Belarus) BLR	Yury Kavalyow	17	1	11+1	1	4+1	0
13	DF	(Venezuela) VEN	Diego Luna	17	0	12	0	4+1	0
16	DF	(Colombia) COL	Kevin Andrade	18	1	12	0	6	1
17	MF	(Croatia) CRO	Kristijan Bistrović	31	3	22+1	2	7+1	1
18	FW	(Chile) CHI	Ángelo Henríquez	38	9	15+11	6	7+5	3
19	MF	(Russia) RUS	Sergei Pryakhin	24	1	7+11	1	1+5	0
21	DF	(Serbia) SRB	Ivan Ostojić	21	0	9+5	0	4+3	0
24	MF	(Russia) RUS	Dmitri Rybchinsky	17	1	3+8	1	4+2	0
25	FW	(Brazil) BRA	Alex Fernandes	18	5	12	4	5+1	1
26	DF	(Serbia) SRB	Nikola Radmanovac	30	0	18+5	0	5+2	0
35	GK	(Russia) RUS	Soslan Dzhanayev	4	0	2+1	0	1	0
59	MF	(Armenia) ARM	Tigran Avanesyan	19	2	0+7	0	8+4	2
67	GK	(Russia) RUS	Maksim Borisko	7	0	2+1	0	4	0
77	FW	(Russia) RUS	Danila Kozlov	15	3	9+1	2	2+3	1
88	FW	(Belarus) BLR	Vitaly Lisakovich	18	4	10+2	4	5+1	0
89	MF	(Russia) RUS	Vladislav Lazarev	12	0	0+8	0	4	0
Players away from the club on loan:
66	MF	(Portugal) POR	João Lameira	6	0	0+2	0	4	0
Players who appeared for Baltika Kaliningrad but left during the season:
8	DF	(Russia) RUS	Aslan Dudiyev	18	0	0+13	0	3+2	0
10	MF	(Russia) RUS	Yan Kazayev	11	0	6+3	0	2	0
11	FW	(Russia) RUS	Dmitry Barkov	2	1	1	0	1	1
13	DF	(Chile) CHI	Guillermo Soto	13	0	9	0	4	0
20	MF	(Armenia) ARM	Artur Galoyan	23	1	9+7	0	4+3	1
22	FW	(Russia) RUS	Tamerlan Musayev	25	4	7+11	2	5+2	2
23	DF	(Russia) RUS	Aleksandr Putsko	8	0	6	0	2	0

=== Goal scorers ===
Place	Position	Nation	Number	Name	Premier League	Russian Cup	Total
1	FW	(Chile)	18	Ángelo Henríquez	6	3	9
2	FW	(Brazil)	25	Alex Fernandes	4	1	5
3	FW	(Belarus)	88	Vitaly Lisakovich	4	0	4
3	FW	(Russia)	22	Tamerlan Musayev	2	2	4
5	FW	(Bosnia and Herzegovina)	9	Gedeon Guzina	2	1	3
5	MF	(Russia)	6	Maksim Kuzmin	2	1	3
5	MF	(Russia)	77	Danila Kozlov	2	1	3
5	MF	(Croatia)	17	Kristijan Bistrović	2	1	3
5				Own goal	2	1	3
10	MF	(Belarus)	8	Kirill Kaplenko	2	0	2
10	DF	(Bolivia)	7	Roberto Fernández	1	1	2
10	MF	(Armenia)	59	Tigran Avanesyan	0	2	2
13	MF	(Russia)	19	Sergei Pryakhin	1	0	1
13	FW	(Ghana)	10	Joel Fameyeh	1	0	1
13	MF	(Belarus)	11	Yury Kavalyow	1	0	1
13	MF	(Russia)	24	Dmitri Rybchinsky	1	0	1
13	FW	(Russia)	11	Dmitry Barkov	0	1	1
13	MF	(Armenia)	20	Artur Galoyan	0	1	1
13	DF	(France)	4	Nathan Gassama	0	1	1
13	DF	(Colombia)	16	Kevin Andrade	0	1	1
Total					33	18	51

=== Clean sheets ===
Place	Position	Nation	Number	Name	Premier League	Russian Cup	Total
1	GK	(Russia)	1	Yevgeni Latyshonok	4	4	8
2	GK	(Russia)	67	Maksim Borisko	1	0	1
2	GK	(Russia)	35	Soslan Dzhanayev	1	0	1
Total					6	4	10

=== Disciplinary record ===
Number	Nation	Position	Name	Premier League		Russian Cup		Total	
Number	Nation	Position	Name	Yellow card	Red card	Yellow card	Red card	Yellow card	Red card
1	(Russia)	GK	Yevgeni Latyshonok	2	0	2	0	4	0
2	(Russia)	DF	Aleksandr Zhirov	1	0	0	0	1	0
3	(Russia)	DF	Kirill Malyarov	2	0	1	0	3	0
4	(France)	DF	Nathan Gassama	4	0	1	0	5	0
5	(Russia)	DF	Aleksandr Osipov	1	0	1	0	2	0
6	(Russia)	MF	Maksim Kuzmin	4	0	0	0	4	0
7	(Bolivia)	DF	Roberto Fernández	2	0	1	0	3	0
8	(Belarus)	MF	Kirill Kaplenko	1	0	1	0	2	0
9	(Bosnia and Herzegovina)	FW	Gedeon Guzina	4	0	1	0	5	0
13	(Venezuela)	DF	Diego Luna	3	0	2	0	5	0
16	(Colombia)	DF	Kevin Andrade	4	0	1	0	5	0
17	(Croatia)	MF	Kristijan Bistrović	3	0	0	0	3	0
18	(Chile)	FW	Ángelo Henríquez	1	0	0	0	1	0
19	(Russia)	MF	Sergei Pryakhin	1	0	0	0	1	0
21	(Serbia)	DF	Ivan Ostojić	2	0	1	0	3	0
24	(Russia)	MF	Dmitri Rybchinsky	1	0	0	0	1	0
25	(Brazil)	FW	Alex Fernandes	3	0	1	0	4	0
26	(Serbia)	DF	Nikola Radmanovac	5	0	1	0	6	0
77	(Russia)	FW	Danila Kozlov	1	0	0	0	1	0
88	(Belarus)	FW	Vitaly Lisakovich	2	0	0	0	2	0
Players away on loan:
66	(Portugal)	MF	João Lameira	0	0	1	0	1	0
Players who left Baltika Kaliningrad during the season:
8	(Russia)	DF	Aslan Dudiyev	1	0	0	0	1	0
13	(Chile)	DF	Guillermo Soto	4	0	0	0	4	0
22	(Russia)	FW	Tamerlan Musayev	1	0	2	0	3	0
Total				53	0	17	0	70	0
