= 2024 Russian Cup final =

Суперфинал Кубка России 2024
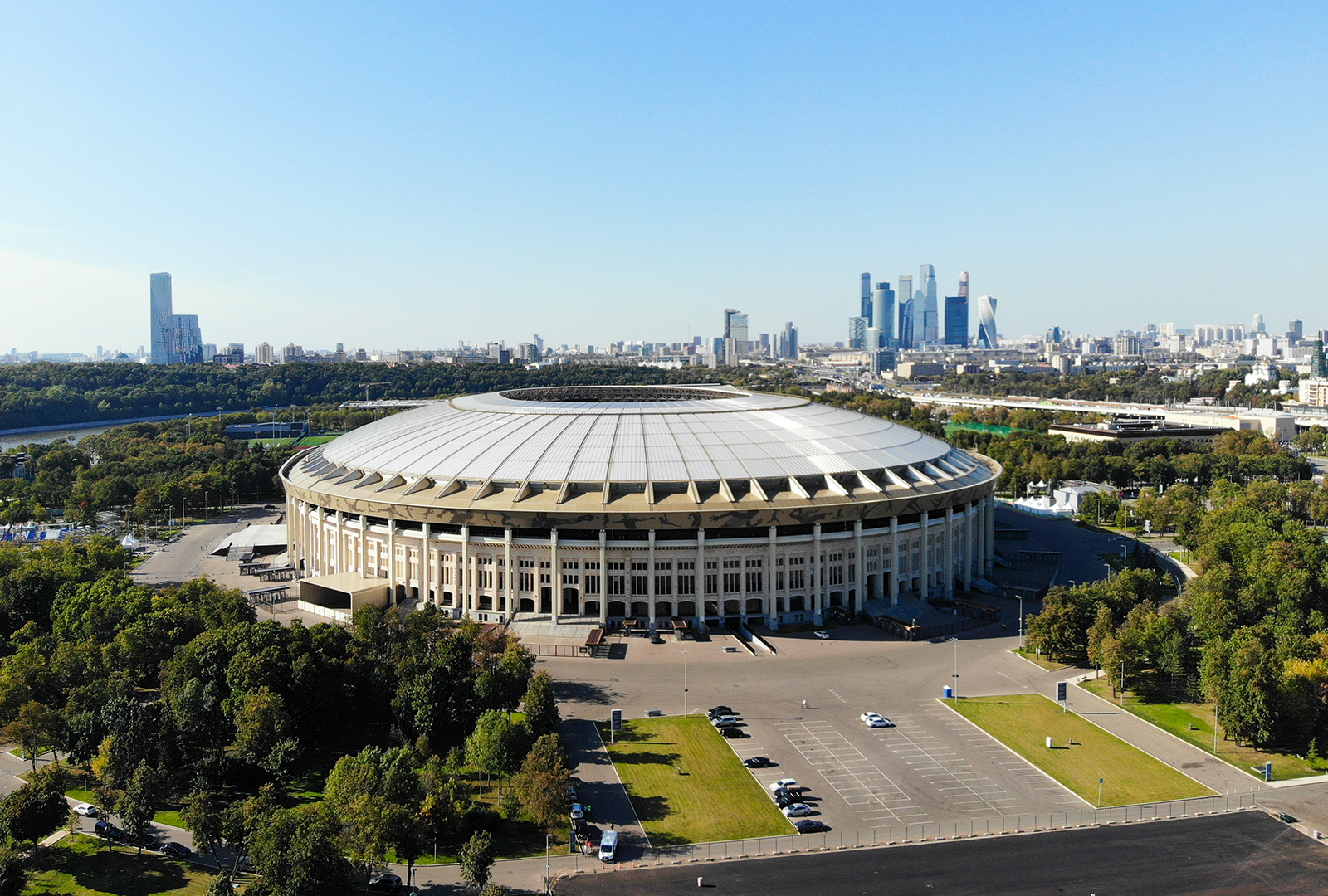
- view of Luzhniki Stadium
- Event: 2023–24 Russian Cup
Baltika Kaliningrad	Zenit St. Petersburg
1	2
- Date: 2 June 2024
- Venue: Luzhniki Stadium, Moscow
- Referee: Sergei Karasev
- Attendance: 41,776

The 2024 Russian Cup final (formally 'Superfinal' due to a new competition structure) was the 32nd Russian Cup Final, the final match of the 2023–24 Russian Cup. It was played at Luzhniki Stadium in Moscow, Russia, on 2 June 2024, contested by Baltika Kaliningrad and Zenit Saint Petersburg.

Zenit Saint Petersburg won the match 2–1 for their sixth Russian Cup, earning their first ever domestic treble, previously having won the 2023 Russian Super Cup and the 2023–24 Russian Premier League. As winners, they earned the right to play against the runners-up of the 2023–24 Russian Premier League, Krasnodar, in the 2024 Russian Super Cup.

== Path to the final ==
Baltika finished the group stage of the cup in second place in Group C (Zenit was also in Group C at that stage, with Baltika winning 1–0 at home and Zenit winning 2–1 in St. Petersburg). Next Baltika eliminated Lokomotiv Moscow in the RPL path quarter-finals. Then they lost to CSKA Moscow in the RPL path semi-finals and were, according to the double-elimination structure of the cup, moved to the Regions Path, in which they eliminated Rostov and Spartak Moscow to reach the final.

Zenit won the Group C, and then consecutively eliminated Dynamo Moscow, Spartak Moscow and CSKA Moscow in the RPL path to reach the final.

== Match ==
=== Details ===
The formal host was determined by a draw on 15 May 2024. The host club chooses the dressing room, the reserves bench, the uniform color and the times for warm-up and pre-game press conference.

2 June 2024
18:00 MSK (UTC+3)

Baltika Kaliningrad (1)	1–2	Zenit Saint Petersburg (1)
Fernandes 41'	Report	Nino 81'; Alip 90+5'

Luzhniki Stadium, Moscow
Attendance: 41,776
Referee: Sergei Karasev

Baltika Kaliningrad	Zenit Saint Petersburg

GK	1	(Russia) Yevgeni Latyshonok
CB	16	(Colombia) Kevin Andrade
CB	2	(Russia) Aleksandr Zhirov
CB	13	(Venezuela) Diego Luna
RM	11	(Belarus) Yury Kavalyow	(substituted off) 46'
CM	5	(Russia) Aleksandr Osipov
CM	17	(Croatia) Kristijan Bistrović (c)
LM	7	(Bolivia) Roberto Fernández	(substituted off) 71'
RF	25	(Brazil) Alex Fernandes
CF	88	(Belarus) Vitaly Lisakovich	(substituted off) 64'
LF	77	(Russia) Danila Kozlov	(substituted off) 87'
Substitutes:
GK	23	(Russia) Ivan Konovalov
GK	67	(Russia) Maksim Borisko
DF	4	(France) Nathan Gassama	(substituted on) 71'
DF	21	(Serbia) Ivan Ostojić
DF	26	(Serbia) Nikola Radmanovac
MF	6	(Russia) Maksim Kuzmin
MF	8	(Belarus) Kirill Kaplenko
MF	19	(Russia) Sergei Pryakhin
MF	24	(Russia) Dmitri Rybchinsky	(substituted on) 46'
MF	59	(Armenia) Tigran Avanesyan	(substituted on) 87'
MF	89	(Russia) Vladislav Lazarev
FW	18	(Chile) Ángelo Henríquez	(substituted on) 64'
Manager:
(Russia) Sergei Ignashevich

GK	16	(Russia) Denis Adamov
CB	25	(Serbia) Strahinja Eraković		(substituted off) 46'
CB	27	(Brazil) Nino
CB	28	(Kazakhstan) Nuraly Alip
RM	9	(Brazil) Artur		(substituted off) 64'
CM	8	(Brazil) Wendel		(substituted off) 90+1'
CM	5	(Colombia) Wilmar Barrios (c)
CM	11	(Brazil) Claudinho	(yellow card) 77'
LM	24	(Brazil) Pedro		(substituted off) 84'
CF	33	(Russia) Ivan Sergeyev		(substituted off) 46'
CF	30	(Colombia) Mateo Cassierra
Substitutes:
GK	1	(Russia) Aleksandr Vasyutin
GK	41	(Russia) Mikhail Kerzhakov
DF	15	(Russia) Vyacheslav Karavayev		(substituted on) 46'
DF	53	(Russia) Matvey Bardachyov
DF	55	(Brazil) Rodrigão
MF	17	(Russia) Andrei Mostovoy		(substituted on) 84'
MF	18	(Russia) Aleksandr Kovalenko
MF	21	(Russia) Aleksandr Yerokhin	(yellow card) 68'	(substituted on) 64'
MF	31	(Brazil) Gustavo Mantuan		(substituted on) 46'
MF	77	(Russia) Ilzat Akhmetov
MF	79	(Russia) Dmitri Vasilyev
FW	10	(France) Wilson Isidor		(substituted on) 90+1'
Manager:
(Russia) Sergei Semak

Assistant referees:
Igor Demeshko (Moscow)
Dmitry Cheltsov (Moscow)
Fourth official:
Vitali Meshkov (Dmitrov)
Reserve assistant:
Andrey Obrazko (Stavropol)
Inspector:
Andrey Butenko (Moscow)
VAR:
Sergey Ivanov (Rostov-on-Don)
AVAR:
Vladimir Moskalyov (Voronezh)

Match rules

- 90 minutes
- No extra time
- Penalty shoot-out if scores level
- Twelve named substitutes
- Maximum of five substitutions
