= Diego Luna (disambiguation) =

Diego Luna (born 1979) is a Mexican actor, director and producer.

Diego Luna may also refer to:

- Diego Luna (footballer, born 2000), Venezuelan football centre-back for Deportivo La Guaira
- Diego Luna (soccer, born 2003), American soccer midfielder for Real Salt Lake
