= Alex Fernandes (footballer, born 2002) =

Brazilian footballer (born 2002)

Personal information
- Full name: Alex Nascimento Fernandes
- Date of birth: 3 June 2002 (age 24)
- Place of birth: Santos, Brazil
- Height: 1.71 m (5 ft 7 in)
- Position: Right winger

Team information
- Current team: Navbahor (on loan from Baltika Kaliningrad)
- Number: 97

Youth career
- Portuários
- 2008–2014: Santos
- 2014–2019: Portuguesa Santista
- 2019: Atlético Mineiro
- 2020–2022: Santos

Senior career*
| Years | Team | Apps | (Gls) |
| 2022 | Cherno More II | 1 | (1) |
| 2022–2024 | Cherno More | 43 | (8) |
| 2024– | Baltika Kaliningrad | 27 | (7) |
| 2025 | → Neftçi (loan) | 13 | (1) |
| 2026– | → Navbahor (loan) | 12 | (1) |
- * Club domestic league appearances and goals as of 29 July 2026

Alex Nascimento Fernandes (born 3 June 2002) is a Brazilian professional footballer who plays as a right winger for Uzbekistan Super League club Navbahor on loan from Russian club Baltika Kaliningrad.

== Career ==
Alex started his career Portuguesa Santista, moving to Atlético Mineiro and in 2020 he joined Santos. On 7 July 2022, he moved to the Bulgarian First League team Cherno More. Fernandes scored one of the goals for the second team in the local league derby against Spartak Varna II in Third League. He completed his professional debut for the first team on 6 August 2022 in a league win against Beroe.

On 21 February 2024 Fernandes was transferred to Baltika Kaliningrad for undisclosed fee. He signed a 3.5-year contract with Baltika. In his fifth league game for Baltika on 13 April 2024, Fernandes scored a hat-trick in a 7–1 away victory over Akhmat Grozny.

On 2 June 2024, Fernandes opened scoring for Baltika in the 2024 Russian Cup final against Zenit St. Petersburg. Zenit eventually won 2–1 in a late comeback.

On 11 February 2025, Azerbaijan Premier League side Neftçi signed Fernandes on loan from Baltika until the end of the 2024–25 season. The loan included an option to extend it until the end of 2025. On 18 February 2026, Alex was loaned to Navbahor Namangan in Uzbekistan until the end of 2026.

== Career statistics ==
As of match played 29 July 2026

Appearances and goals by club, season and competition
| Club | Season | League | | | Cup | | Continental | | Other | | Total | |
| Club | Season | Division | Apps | Goals | Apps | Goals | Apps | Goals | Apps | Goals | Apps | Goals |
|---|---|---|---|---|---|---|---|---|---|---|---|---|
| Cherno More II | 2022–23 | Third League | 1 | 1 | – | | – | | – | | 1 | 1 |
| Cherno More | 2022–23 | First League | 25 | 3 | 5 | 1 | – | | – | | 30 | 4 |
| Cherno More | 2023–24 | First League | 18 | 5 | 1 | 0 | – | | – | | 19 | 5 |
| Cherno More | Total | | 43 | 8 | 6 | 1 | – | | – | | 49 | 9 |
| Baltika Kaliningrad | 2023–24 | Russian Premier League | 12 | 4 | 6 | 1 | – | | – | | 18 | 5 |
| Baltika Kaliningrad | 2024–25 | Russian First League | 15 | 3 | 2 | 3 | – | | – | | 17 | 6 |
| Baltika Kaliningrad | Total | | 27 | 7 | 8 | 4 | – | | – | | 35 | 11 |
| Neftçi (loan) | 2024–25 | Azerbaijan Premier League | 13 | 1 | 3 | 0 | – | | – | | 16 | 1 |
| Navbahor Namangan (loan) | 2026 | Uzbekistan Super League | 12 | 1 | 0 | 0 | – | | – | | 12 | 1 |
| Career total | | | 95 | 17 | 17 | 5 | 0 | 0 | 0 | 0 | 112 | 22 |
