= Yevgeni Latyshonok =

Russian footballer (born 1998)

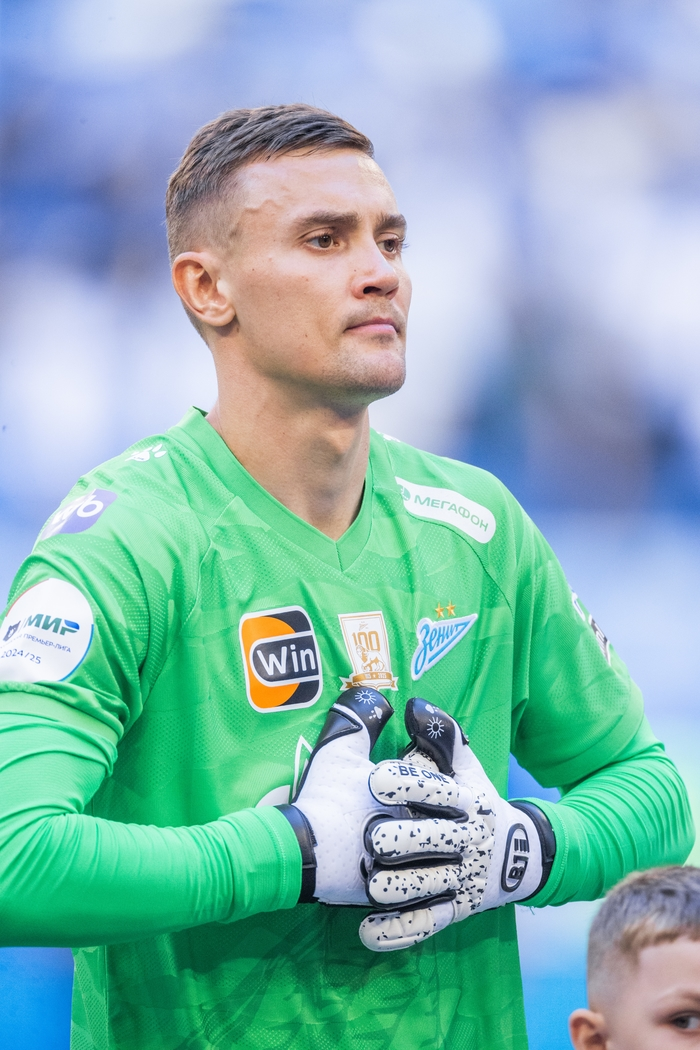
- Latyshonok with Zenit St. Petersburg in 2024

Personal information
- Full name: Yevgeni Igorevich Latyshonok
- Date of birth: 21 June 1998 (age 28)
- Place of birth: Giaginskaya, Russia
- Height: 1.88 m (6 ft 2 in)
- Position: Goalkeeper

Team information
- Current team: Baltika Kaliningrad (on loan from Nizhny Novgorod)
- Number: 1

Youth career
- –2012: Druzhba Maykop
- 2012–2016: Krasnodar

Senior career*
| Years | Team | Apps | (Gls) |
| 2016–2019 | Krasnodar | 0 | (0) |
| 2016–2019 | → Krasnodar-2 | 20 | (0) |
| 2018–2019 | → Krasnodar-3 | 13 | (0) |
| 2019–2024 | Baltika Kaliningrad | 111 | (0) |
| 2024–2026 | Zenit St. Petersburg | 31 | (0) |
| 2026– | Nizhny Novgorod | 0 | (0) |
| 2026– | → Baltika Kaliningrad (loan) | 14 | (0) |

International career^{‡}
| 2014 | Russia U-16 | 1 | (0) |
| 2024– | Russia | 2 | (0) |
- * Club domestic league appearances and goals as of 21 November 2026 ‡ National team caps and goals as of 19 March 2025

Yevgeni Igorevich Latyshonok (Russian: Евгений Игоревич Латышонок; born 21 June 1998) is a Russian professional footballer who plays as a goalkeeper for Russian Premier League club Baltika Kaliningrad on loan from Nizhny Novgorod, and the Russia national team.

== Club career ==
Latyshonok made his debut in the Russian Professional Football League for Krasnodar-2 on 5 April 2017 in a game against Chayka Peschanokopskoye.

On 23 July 2019, he joined Baltika Kaliningrad. He made his Russian Football National League debut for Baltika on 10 August 2019 in a game against Mordovia Saransk.

Latyshonok made his Russian Premier League debut for Baltika Kaliningrad on 23 July 2023 in a game against Sochi.

On 14 June 2024, Latyshonok signed a contract with Zenit St. Petersburg for four seasons, with an optional fifth season.

On 29 July 2026, Latyshonok moved to Nizhny Novgorod in the Russian First League on a three-year contract, and was immediately loaned to Baltika Kaliningrad for the 2026–27 season.

== International career ==
Latyshonok was first called up to the Russia national team for 2024 LPBank Cup in September 2024. He made his debut on 5 September 2024 in a game against Vietnam.

== Career statistics ==
As of 21 November 2026

| Club | Season | League | | | Cup | | Europe | | Other | | Total | |
| Club | Season | Division | Apps | Goals | Apps | Goals | Apps | Goals | Apps | Goals | Apps | Goals |
|---|---|---|---|---|---|---|---|---|---|---|---|---|
| Krasnodar-2 | 2016–17 | Russian Second League | 5 | 0 | — | | — | | 5 (Note: Appearances in the FNL Cup) | 0 | 10 | 0 |
| Krasnodar-2 | 2017–18 | Russian Second League | 15 | 0 | — | | — | | — | | 15 | 0 |
| Krasnodar-2 | 2018–19 | Russian First League | 0 | 0 | — | | — | | — | | 0 | 0 |
| Krasnodar-2 | Total | | 20 | 0 | 0 | 0 | — | | 5 | 0 | 25 | 0 |
| Krasnodar | 2016–17 | Russian Premier League | 0 | 0 | 0 | 0 | 0 | 0 | — | | 0 | 0 |
| Krasnodar | 2017–18 | Russian Premier League | 0 | 0 | 0 | 0 | 0 | 0 | — | | 0 | 0 |
| Krasnodar | 2018–19 | Russian Premier League | 0 | 0 | 0 | 0 | 0 | 0 | — | | 0 | 0 |
| Krasnodar | Total | | 0 | 0 | 0 | 0 | 0 | 0 | 0 | 0 | 0 | 0 |
| Krasnodar-3 | 2018–19 | Russian Second League | 13 | 0 | — | | — | | — | | 13 | 0 |
| Baltika Kaliningrad | 2019–20 | Russian First League | 12 | 0 | 2 | 0 | — | | — | | 14 | 0 |
| Baltika Kaliningrad | 2020–21 | Russian First League | 31 | 0 | 1 | 0 | — | | — | | 32 | 0 |
| Baltika Kaliningrad | 2021–22 | Russian First League | 22 | 0 | 4 | 0 | — | | — | | 26 | 0 |
| Baltika Kaliningrad | 2022–23 | Russian First League | 20 | 0 | 1 | 0 | — | | — | | 21 | 0 |
| Baltika Kaliningrad | 2023–24 | Russian Premier League | 26 | 0 | 8 | 0 | — | | — | | 34 | 0 |
| Baltika Kaliningrad | Total | | 111 | 0 | 16 | 0 | — | | — | | 127 | 0 |
| Zenit Saint Petersburg | 2024–25 | Russian Premier League | 27 | 0 | 0 | 0 | — | | 1 (Note: Appearance in Russian Super Cup) | 0 | 28 | 0 |
| Zenit Saint Petersburg | 2025–26 | Russian Premier League | 4 | 0 | 9 | 0 | — | | — | | 13 | 0 |
| Zenit Saint Petersburg | Total | | 31 | 0 | 9 | 0 | 0 | 0 | 1 | 0 | 41 | 0 |
| Baltika Kaliningrad (loan) | 2026–27 | Russian Premier League | 14 | 0 | 0 | 0 | — | | — | | 14 | 0 |
| Baltika Kaliningrad (loan) | Club total | | 125 | 0 | 16 | 0 | — | | — | | 141 | 0 |
| Career total | | | 189 | 0 | 25 | 0 | 0 | 0 | 6 | 0 | 220 | 0 |

=== International ===
As of match played 19 March 2025

Appearances and goals by national team and year
| National team | Year | Apps | Goals |
|---|---|---|---|
| Russia | 2024 | 1 | 0 |
| Russia | 2025 | 1 | 0 |
| Total | | 2 | 0 |

== Honours ==
Zenit Saint Petersburg

- Russian Premier League: 2025–26
- Russian Super Cup: 2024, 2026
