= Kevin Andrade =

Colombian footballer (born 1999)

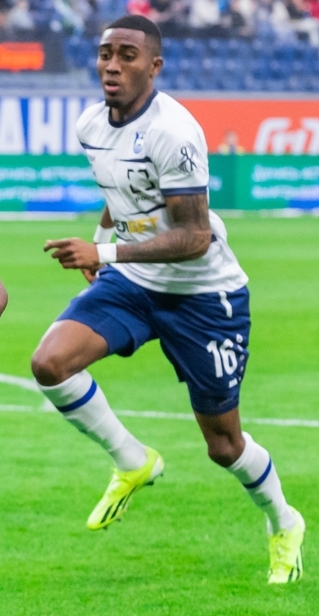
- Andrade playing for Baltika Kaliningrad in 2024

Personal information
- Full name: Kevin Orlando Andrade Murillo
- Date of birth: 16 June 1999 (age 27)
- Place of birth: Cali, Colombia
- Height: 1.89 m (6 ft 2 in)
- Position: Centre-back

Team information
- Current team: Zenit Saint Petersburg
- Number: 25

Youth career
- –2019: América de Cali

Senior career*
Years	Team	Apps	(Gls)
2018–2024	América de Cali	104	(3)
2022	→ Platense (loan)	9	(1)
2024–2026	Baltika Kaliningrad	69	(2)
2026–	Zenit Saint Petersburg	14	(1)

International career^{‡}
2026–	Colombia	3	(0)
- * Club domestic league appearances and goals as of 8 November 2026 ‡ National team caps and goals as of 17 November 2026

Kevin Orlando Andrade Murillo (born 16 June 1999) is a Colombian professional footballer who plays as a centre-back for Russian Premier League club Zenit Saint Petersburg and the Colombia national team.

A graduate of the América de Cali academy, Andrade began his senior career with the club in 2018 and was part of the squads that won consecutive Categoría Primera A championships in 2019 and 2020. After a loan spell with Argentine club Platense, he joined Baltika Kaliningrad in 2024. He helped Baltika reach the 2024 Russian Cup final and win the Russian First League in 2024–25 before signing for Zenit in 2026.

== Club career ==
=== América de Cali ===
Born in Cali, Andrade developed in the youth system of América de Cali. He made his professional debut on 29 August 2018, aged 19, in a 2–0 defeat against Leones in the Copa Colombia.

Andrade was part of the América squads that won the 2019 Finalización and the 2020 Categoría Primera A. He scored his first professional goal on 24 March 2021, equalising during a 2–1 league defeat against Independiente Medellín. During the 2021 season, he made 35 league appearances and also represented América in the Copa Libertadores, Copa Sudamericana and Superliga Colombiana.

On 4 February 2022, Andrade joined Argentine Primera División club Platense on loan. The agreement was initially scheduled to run until December 2022 and included options for Platense to acquire either 50 or 80 per cent of his rights. He made nine league appearances and scored once before returning to América during the same year.

After his return, Andrade became a regular starter for América. He made 20 league appearances and scored once during 2022, followed by 43 appearances and one goal in 2023. He left the club in January 2024, having made 119 senior appearances and scored three goals in all competitions.

=== Baltika Kaliningrad ===
On 17 January 2024, Andrade signed a three-and-a-half-year contract with Russian Premier League club Baltika Kaliningrad. He made his Russian Premier League debut on 3 March, starting in a match against Sochi.

On 14 May 2024, Andrade scored the only goal in Baltika's 1–0 victory over Spartak Moscow in the Regions Path final of the 2023–24 Russian Cup. The result sent Baltika to the Russian Cup final for the first time in the club's history. Baltika were defeated 2–1 by Zenit Saint Petersburg in the 2024 Russian Cup final on 2 June. Baltika were also relegated from the Premier League at the end of the 2023–24 season.

Andrade remained with the club in the Russian First League and made 31 league appearances during the 2024–25 season. Baltika won the division and secured an immediate return to the Premier League. He subsequently played 26 league matches in 2025–26 as Baltika finished sixth in the Premier League. Across his two-and-a-half seasons in Kaliningrad, he made 83 appearances and scored three goals in all competitions.

=== Zenit Saint Petersburg ===
On 23 May 2026, Andrade joined reigning Russian champions Zenit Saint Petersburg, signing a five-year contract through the end of the 2030–31 season. He was assigned the number 25 shirt.

Andrade made his competitive debut for Zenit on 18 July, coming on during the second half of the 2026 Russian Super Cup against Spartak Moscow. The match finished 1–1 before Zenit won the penalty shoot-out 4–2.

He scored his first Zenit goal on 5 August, heading in during the second minute of a 1–0 Russian Cup victory over his former club Baltika. On 12 September, he scored his first Premier League goal for the club, equalising in a 2–1 home victory over Lokomotiv Moscow.

== International career ==
Andrade was involved with the Colombia under-20 team in 2018. He was called into a training squad preparing for the football tournament at the 2018 South American Games in Cochabamba, Bolivia.

In September 2026, Andrade received his first call-up to the Colombia senior team. He was included in Néstor Lorenzo's 26-player squad for friendly matches against Mexico, Paraguay and Peru in the United States. On 2 October 2026, he made his debut against Paraguay.

== Career statistics ==
=== Club ===
As of match played 8 November 2026

Appearances and goals by club, season and competition
Club	Season	League			National cup		Continental		Other		Total	
Club	Season	Division	Apps	Goals	Apps	Goals	Apps	Goals	Apps	Goals	Apps	Goals
América de Cali	2018	Liga DIMAYOR	0	0	1	0	—		—		1	0
América de Cali	2019	Liga DIMAYOR	0	0	2	0	—		—		2	0
América de Cali	2020	Liga DIMAYOR	6	0	0	0	0	0	0	0	6	0
América de Cali	2021	Liga DIMAYOR	35	1	1	0	7 (Note: Five appearances in Copa Libertadores, two appearances in Copa Sudamericana)	0	2 (Note: Appearances in Superliga Colombiana)	0	45	1
América de Cali	2022	Liga DIMAYOR	20	1	0	0	—		—		20	1
América de Cali	2023	Liga DIMAYOR	43	1	2	0	—		—		45	1
América de Cali	Total		104	3	6	0	7	0	2	0	119	3
Platense (loan)	2022	AFA Liga Profesional de Fútbol	9	1	—		—		—		9	1
Baltika Kaliningrad	2023–24	Russian Premier League	12	0	6	1	—		—		18	1
Baltika Kaliningrad	2024–25	Russian First League	31	1	2	0	—		—		33	1
Baltika Kaliningrad	2025–26	Russian Premier League	26	1	6	0	—		—		32	1
Baltika Kaliningrad	Total		69	2	14	1	0	0	0	0	83	3
Zenit Saint Petersburg	2026–27	Russian Premier League	14	1	5	2	—		1 (Note: Appearance in Russian Super Cup)	0	20	3
Career total			196	7	25	3	7	0	3	0	231	10

=== International ===
As of match played 6 October 2026

Appearances and goals by national team and year
National team	Year	Apps	Goals
Colombia	2026	2	0
Total		2	0

== Honours ==
América de Cali

- Categoría Primera A: 2019 Finalización, 2020

Baltika Kaliningrad

- Russian First League: 2024–25

Zenit Saint Petersburg

- Russian Super Cup: 2026
