= Nathan Gassama =

Malian footballer (born 2001)

Personal information
- Date of birth: 5 January 2001 (age 25)
- Place of birth: Évry, France
- Height: 1.92 m (6 ft 4 in)
- Position: Centre-back

Team information
- Current team: Baltika Kaliningrad
- Number: 4

Youth career
- –2017: Évry
- 2017–2019: Nantes

Senior career*
Years	Team	Apps	(Gls)
2020–2021	Nantes B	3	(0)
2021–2022	Troyes B	14	(2)
2022	Troyes	0	(0)
2022–2023	Cholet	3	(1)
2023	Slavia Sofia	19	(0)
2023–	Baltika Kaliningrad	82	(2)

International career^{‡}
2025–	Mali	10	(0)
- * Club domestic league appearances and goals as of 21 November 2026 ‡ National team caps and goals as of 13 November 2026

Nathan Gassama (born 5 January 2001) is a football player who plays as a centre-back for Russian club Baltika Kaliningrad. Born in France, he plays for the Mali national team.

== Career ==
On 5 August 2023, Gassama signed a five-year contract with Russian Premier League club Baltika Kaliningrad. He made his RPL debut for Baltika on 19 August 2023 in a game against Ural Yekaterinburg.

== International career ==
Gassama was born in France to a Malian father and French mother. He was called up to the Mali national team for a set of friendlies in November 2025.

On 11 December 2025, Gassama was called up to the Mali squad for the 2025 Africa Cup of Nations.

== Career statistics ==
=== Club ===
As of match played 21 November 2026

Appearances and goals by club, season and competition
Club	Season	League			National cup (Note: Includes Bulgarian Cup, Russian Cup)		Total	
Club	Season	Division	Apps	Goals	Apps	Goals	Apps	Goals
Nantes II	2020–21	CFA	3	0	—		3	0
Troyes B	2021–22	CFA 2	14	2	—		14	2
Troyes	2021–22	Ligue 1	0	0	0	0	0	0
Cholet	2022–23	Ligue 3	3	1	0	0	3	1
Slavia Sofia	2022–23	First League	18	0	1	0	19	0
Slavia Sofia	2023–24	First League	1	0	0	0	1	0
Slavia Sofia	Total		19	0	1	0	20	0
Baltika	2023–24	Russian Premier League	15	0	7	1	22	1
Baltika	2024–25	Russian First League	29	2	0	0	29	2
Baltika	2025–26	Russian Premier League	24	0	6	1	30	1
Baltika	2026–27	Russian Premier League	14	0	2	0	16	0
Baltika	Total		82	2	15	2	97	4
Career total			121	5	16	2	137	7

=== International ===
As of match played 13 November 2026

Appearances and goals by national team and year
National team	Year	Apps	Goals
Mali	2025	3	0
Mali	2026	7	0
Total		10	0
