= Kirill Kaplenko =

Belarusian-Russian footballer (born 1999)

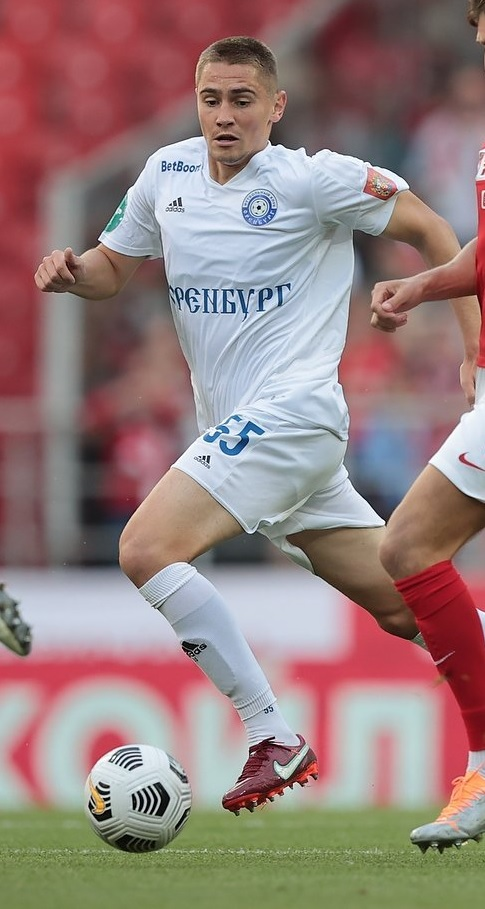
- Kaplenko with Orenburg in 2022

Personal information
- Full name: Kirill Dmitriyevich Kaplenko
- Date of birth: 15 June 1999 (age 27)
- Place of birth: Minsk, Belarus
- Height: 1.86 m (6 ft 1 in)
- Position: Defensive midfielder

Team information
- Current team: BATE Borisov
- Number: 55

Youth career
- Dinamo Minsk
- 2013–2014: BATE Borisov
- 2015–2016: Krasnodar
- 2017: Zenit Saint Petersburg

Senior career*
Years	Team	Apps	(Gls)
2017–2019	Zenit-2 Saint Petersburg	48	(0)
2017–2022	Zenit Saint Petersburg	2	(0)
2020–2022	→ Orenburg (loan)	56	(2)
2022–2023	Orenburg	32	(2)
2024	Baltika Kaliningrad	14	(2)
2024	→ Baltika-BFU Kaliningrad	1	(0)
2024–2025	Khimki	5	(0)
2025	Spartak Kostroma	3	(0)
2026	Dinamo Minsk	1	(0)
2026	FC Dinamo-2 Minsk	6	(4)
2026–	BATE Borisov	1	(0)

International career^{‡}
2018–2019	Russia U20	4	(0)
2022–	Belarus	10	(0)
- * Club domestic league appearances and goals as of 6 July 2026 ‡ National team caps and goals as of 8 September 2024

Kirill Dmitriyevich Kaplenko (Belarusian: Кірыл Дзмітрыевіч Капленка; Russian: Кирилл Дмитриевич Капленко; born 15 June 1999) is a Belarusian footballer who plays as a defensive midfielder for BATE Borisov and the Belarus national team.

== Club career ==
He made his debut in the Russian Football National League for Zenit-2 St. Petersburg on 22 July 2017 in a game against Tyumen.

He made his Russian Premier League debut for Zenit St. Petersburg on 18 September 2017 in a game against Ufa.

On 21 February 2020 he was loaned to Orenburg. The loan was extended for the 2020–21 season on 30 July 2020. On 14 June 2022, Orenburg bought out his rights from Zenit.

On 9 February 2024, Kaplenko signed a contract with Baltika Kaliningrad until June 2028.

On 25 August 2024, Kaplenko signed a contract with Khimki.

== International ==
Kaplenko was born and raised in Belarus. Upon moving to Russia, he acquired Russian citizenship and was called up to the Russia national under-20 football team in September 2018. In fall 2017 he was called up to the Belarus national under-21 football team for the U21 Euro qualifying matches against Czech Republic and Greece, but rejected the invitation, citing his intention to represent Russia. After failing to attract interest from Russian national team, in 2022 Kaplenko accepted the invite from Belarus. He made his debut for the team on 17 November 2022 in a friendly match against Syria.

== Career statistics ==
=== Club ===
As of match played 29 March 2025

Club	Season	League			Cup		Continental		Other		Total	
Club	Season	Division	Apps	Goals	Apps	Goals	Apps	Goals	Apps	Goals	Apps	Goals
Zenit-2 St. Petersburg	2016–17	Russian First League	—		—		—		1 (Note: Appearance in the FNL Cup)	0	1	0
Zenit-2 St. Petersburg	2017–18	Russian First League	10	0	—		—		—		10	0
Zenit-2 St. Petersburg	2018–19	Russian First League	22	0	—		—		—		22	0
Zenit-2 St. Petersburg	2019–20	Russian Second League	16	0	—		—		—		16	0
Zenit-2 St. Petersburg	Total		48	0	—		—		1	0	49	0
Zenit St. Petersburg	2017–18	Russian Premier League	2	0	1	0	0	0	—		3	0
Zenit St. Petersburg	2019–20	Russian Premier League	0	0	0	0	0	0	—		0	0
Zenit St. Petersburg	Total		2	0	1	0	0	0	0	0	3	0
Orenburg (loan)	2019–20	Russian Premier League	1	0	—		—		—		1	0
Orenburg (loan)	2020–21	Russian First League	28	1	0	0	—		—		28	1
Orenburg (loan)	2021–22	Russian First League	27	1	0	0	—		2 (Note: Appearances in the promotion play-offs)	0	29	1
Orenburg	2022–23	Russian Premier League	20	2	3	0	—		—		23	2
Orenburg	2023–24	Russian Premier League	12	0	4	0	—		—		16	0
Orenburg	Total		88	4	7	0	—		2	0	97	4
Baltika	2023–24	Russian Premier League	11	2	5	0	—		—		16	2
Baltika-BFU	2024	Russian Second League	1	0	—		—		—		1	0
Khimki	2024–25	Russian Premier League	5	0	3	0	—		—		8	0
Career total			155	6	16	0	0	0	3	0	174	6

=== International ===
As of match played 26 March 2024

Appearances and goals by national team and year
National team	Year	Apps	Goals
Belarus	2022	2	0
Belarus	2023	5	0
Belarus	2024	2	0
Total		9	0

== Personal life ==
His older brother Nikita Kaplenko is also a footballer.
