= Aleksandr Osipov (footballer) =

Russian footballer

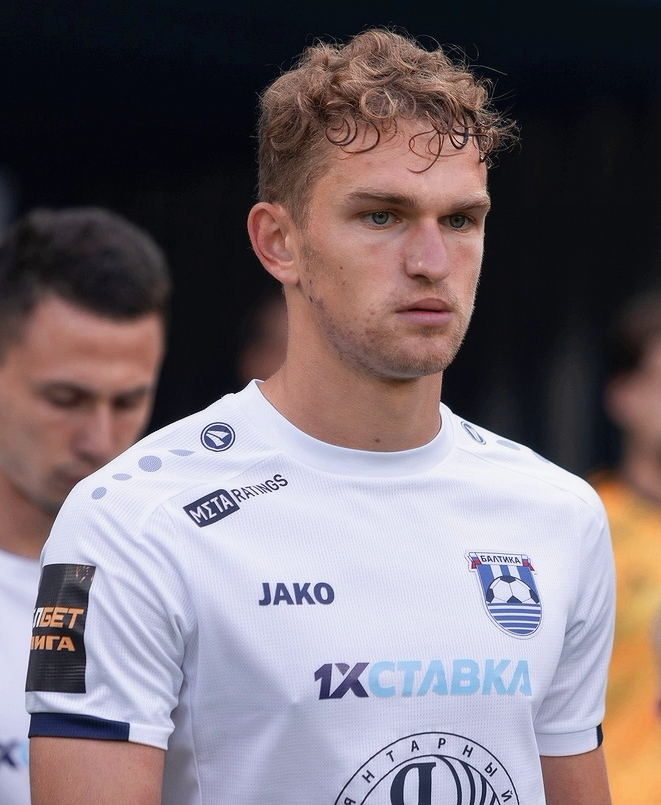

Personal information
- Full name: Aleksandr Vladimirovich Osipov
- Date of birth: 21 October 1998 (age 28)
- Place of birth: Kolomna, Russia
- Height: 1.84 m (6 ft 0 in)
- Positions: Defensive midfielder; centre-back

Team information
- Current team: Sochi
- Number: 5

Youth career
- –2009: Viktoriya Kolomna
- 2009–2016: UOR #5 Yegoryevsk
- 2016–2019: Arsenal Tula

Senior career*
Years	Team	Apps	(Gls)
2019–2021	Veles Moscow	72	(1)
2022–2025	Baltika Kaliningrad	89	(3)
2025–	Sochi	6	(0)
- * Club domestic league appearances and goals as of 7 December 2025

Aleksandr Vladimirovich Osipov (Russian: Александр Владимирович Осипов; born 21 October 1998) is a Russian professional footballer who plays as a defensive midfielder for Sochi. He has also played as a centre-back in the past.

== Club career ==
He made his debut in the Russian Football National League for Veles Moscow on 1 August 2020 in a game against Tekstilshchik Ivanovo, as a starter.

Osipov made his Russian Premier League debut for Baltika Kaliningrad on 27 August 2023 against Krylia Sovetov Samara.

On 23 June 2025, Osipov signed with Sochi.

== Career statistics ==
As of 7 December 2025

Club	Season	League			Cup		Total	
Club	Season	Division	Apps	Goals	Apps	Goals	Apps	Goals
Veles Moscow	2019–20	Russian Second League	15	1	2	0	17	1
Veles Moscow	2020–21	Russian First League	39	0	1	0	40	0
Veles Moscow	2021–22	Russian First League	18	0	3	0	21	0
Veles Moscow	Total		72	1	6	0	78	1
Baltika Kaliningrad	2021–22	Russian First League	10	0	1	0	11	0
Baltika Kaliningrad	2022–23	Russian First League	33	1	1	0	34	1
Baltika Kaliningrad	2023–24	Russian Premier League	19	0	8	0	27	0
Baltika Kaliningrad	2024–25	Russian First League	27	2	1	0	28	2
Baltika Kaliningrad	Total		89	3	11	0	100	3
Sochi	2025–26	Russian Premier League	6	0	4	0	10	0
Career total			167	4	21	0	188	4
