= Vladislav Lazarev =

Russian footballer

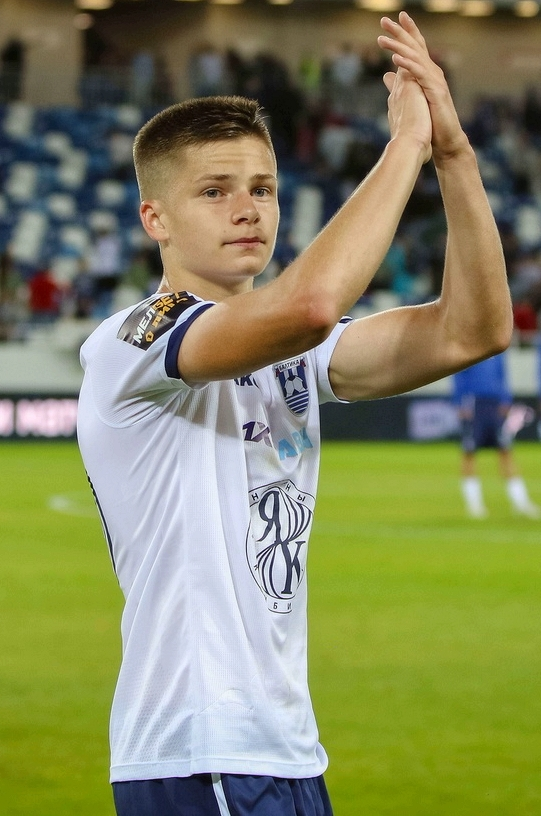

Personal information
- Full name: Vladislav Vadimovich Lazarev
- Date of birth: 13 November 2001 (age 24)
- Place of birth: Kaliningrad, Russia
- Height: 1.70 m (5 ft 7 in)
- Position: Attacking midfielder

Team information
- Current team: Gomel
- Number: 77

Youth career
- –2013: Baltika Kaliningrad
- 2013–2017: CSKA Moscow
- 2017–2020: Baltika Kaliningrad

Senior career*
Years	Team	Apps	(Gls)
2020–2025	Baltika Kaliningrad	68	(13)
2021–2023	Baltika-BFU Kaliningrad	5	(1)
2024–2025	→ Sochi (loan)	10	(0)
2025	→ Chayka Peschanokopskoye (loan)	6	(0)
2025–2026	Sokol Saratov	26	(0)
2026–	Gomel	4	(1)
- * Club domestic league appearances and goals as of 5 September 2026

Vladislav Vadimovich Lazarev (Russian: Владислав Вадимович Лазарев; born 13 November 2001) is a Russian football player who plays as an attacking midfielder for Gomel.

== Career ==
He made his debut in the Russian Football National League for Baltika Kaliningrad on 24 October 2020 in a game against Irtysh Omsk.

Lazarev made his Russian Premier League debut for Baltika Kaliningrad on 23 July 2023 in a game against Sochi.

== Career statistics ==
As of 24 May 2025

Club	Season	League			Cup		Continental		Total	
Club	Season	Division	Apps	Goals	Apps	Goals	Apps	Goals	Apps	Goals
Baltika Kaliningrad	2020–21	Russian First League	6	0	0	0	–		6	0
Baltika Kaliningrad	2021–22	Russian First League	22	6	3	0	–		25	6
Baltika Kaliningrad	2022–23	Russian First League	32	7	0	0	–		32	7
Baltika Kaliningrad	2023–24	Russian Premier League	8	0	4	0	–		12	0
Baltika Kaliningrad	Total		68	13	7	0	0	0	75	13
Baltika-BFU Kaliningrad	2021–22	Russian Second League	4	0	–		–		4	0
Baltika-BFU Kaliningrad	2022–23	Russian Second League	1	1	–		–		1	1
Baltika-BFU Kaliningrad	Total		5	1	0	0	0	0	5	1
Sochi (loan)	2024–25	Russian First League	10	0	4	0	–		14	0
Chayka Peschanokopskoye (loan)	2024–25	Russian First League	6	0	0	0	–		6	0
Career total			89	14	11	0	0	0	100	14
