= Diego Luna (footballer, born 2000) =

Venezuelan footballer (born 2000)

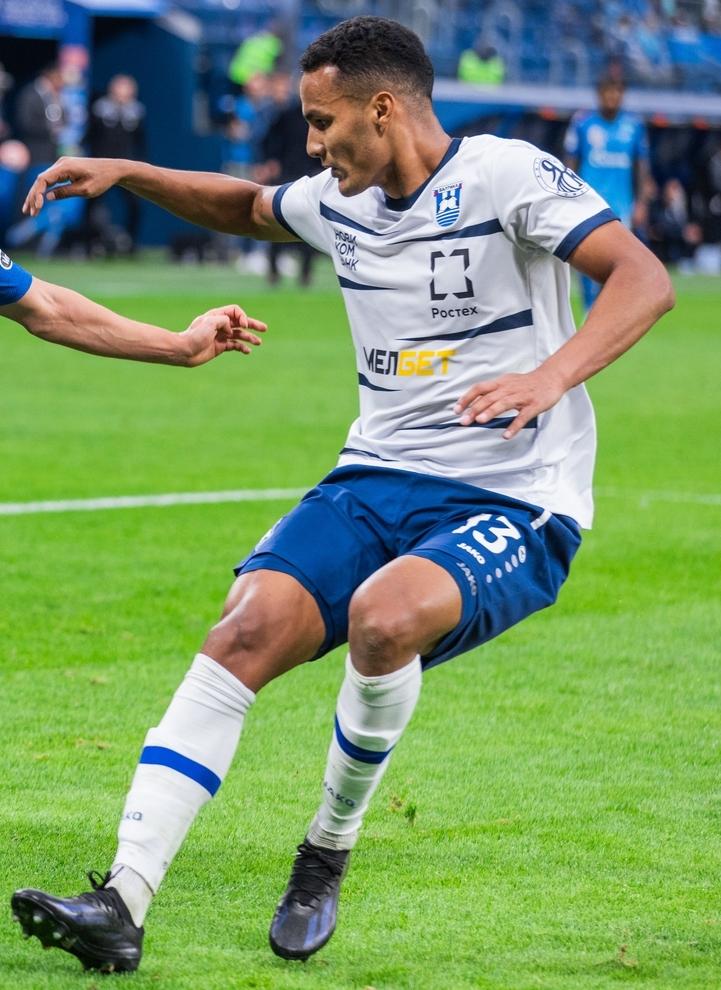

Personal information
- Full name: Diego Alfonzo Luna Flores
- Date of birth: 2 January 2000 (age 26)
- Place of birth: Ciudad Bolívar, Venezuela
- Height: 1.84 m (6 ft 0 in)
- Position: Centre back

Team information
- Current team: Zhetysu

Youth career
- LALA FC
- Deportivo La Guaira

Senior career*
Years	Team	Apps	(Gls)
2017–2021	Deportivo La Guaira	37	(2)
2020	→ RSD Alcalá (loan)	5	(0)
2021–2023	Zamora	34	(2)
2023–2024	Caracas	32	(1)
2024–2025	Baltika Kaliningrad	16	(0)
2024–2025	→ Khimki (loan)	2	(0)
2026–	Zhetysu	21	(0)

International career^{‡}
2017	Venezuela U17	8	(1)
2017	Venezuela U20	1	(0)
- * Club domestic league appearances and goals as of 1 November 2026 ‡ National team caps and goals as of 15 November 2017

Diego Alfonzo Luna Flores (born 2 January 2000) is a Venezuelan football player who plays as a centre-back for Zhetysu.

== Career ==
=== Club career ===
Luna played his younger years at LALA FC before later joining Deportivo La Guaira. In January 2020, Luna was loaned out to Spanish Tercera División club RSD Alcalá.

On 13 February 2024, Luna signed a three-and-a-half-year contract with Baltika Kaliningrad in the Russian Premier League.

On 30 August 2024, Luna was loaned out to Russian club Khimki.

On 27 December 2025, Luna's contract with Baltika was mutually terminated.

== Career statistics ==
As of match played 2 July 2026

Appearances and goals by club, season and competition
Club	Season	League			Cup		Continental		Other		Total	
Club	Season	Division	Apps	Goals	Apps	Goals	Apps	Goals	Apps	Goals	Apps	Goals
Deportivo La Guaira	2017	Venezuelan Primera División	12	1	0	0	–		–		12	1
Deportivo La Guaira	2018	Venezuelan Primera División	20	1	1	0	–		–		21	1
Deportivo La Guaira	2019	Venezuelan Primera División	5	0	0	0	4 (Note: Appearance(s) in Copa Libertadores)	0	–		9	0
Deportivo La Guaira	Total		37	2	1	0	4	0	–		42	2
Alcalá (loan)	2019–20	Segunda División B	5	0	–		–		1 (Note: Appearance in Segunda División B play-offs)	0	6	0
Zamora	2021	Venezuelan Primera División	9	1	–		–		–		9	1
Zamora	2022	Venezuelan Primera División	21	0	–		–		4 (Note: Appearance in Liga FUTVE play-offs)	1	25	1
Zamora	Total		30	1	0	0	–		4	1	34	2
Caracas	2023	Venezuelan Primera División	25	0	0	0	0	0	6	1	31	1
Caracas	2024	Venezuelan Primera División	1	0	0	0	–		–		1	0
Caracas	Total		26	0	0	0	0	0	6	1	32	1
Baltika	2023–24	Russian Premier League	12	0	5	0	–		–		17	0
Baltika	2024–25	Russian First League	3	0	0	0	–		–		3	0
Baltika	2025–26	Russian Premier League	1	0	3	0	—		—		4	0
Baltika	Total		16	0	8	0	0	0	0	0	24	0
Khimki (loan)	2024–25	Russian Premier League	2	0	3	0	–		–		5	0
Zhetysu	2026	Kazakhstan Premier League	7	0	2	0	–		–		9	0
Career total			123	3	14	0	4	0	11	2	152	5
