= 2025 Russian Super Cup =

Krasnodar	CSKA Moscow
0	1
- Date: 12 July 2025
- Venue: Ak Bars Arena, Kazan
- Man of the Match: Igor Diveyev
- Referee: Artyom Chistyakov
- Attendance: 34,677

The 2025 Russian Super Cup (Russian: Суперкубок России по футболу 2025, full name Olimpbet 2025 Russian Super Cup for sponsorship reasons) was the 23rd edition of the Russian Super Cup, an annual football match organised jointly by the Russian Football Union and the Russian Premier League. It was contested by the reigning champions of the Russian Premier League FC Krasnodar and holders of the Russian Cup, PFC CSKA Moscow. It was played at Ak Bars Arena in Kazan, Russia. CSKA won 1–0, winning the trophy for the 8th time.

== Teams ==
Team	Qualification	Previous participations (bold indicates winners)
Krasnodar	2024–25 Russian Premier League champions	1 (2024)
CSKA Moscow	2024–25 Russian Cup winners	12 (2003, **2004**, **2006**, **2007**, **2009**, 2010, 2011, **2013**, **2014**, 2016, **2018**, 2023)

== Match ==
=== Details ===
12 July 2025
18:00 MSK (UTC+3)

Krasnodar	0–1	CSKA
	Report	Diveyev 48'

Ak Bars Arena, Kazan
Attendance: 34,677
Referee: Artyom Chistyakov (Azov)

GK	1	(Russia) Stanislav Agkatsev
DF	4	(Brazil) Diego Costa	(yellow card) 90'
DF	3	(Brazil) Vítor Tormena
DF	15	(Uruguay) Lucas Olaza
DF	20	(Uruguay) Giovanni González		(substituted off) 67'
MF	10	(Armenia) Eduard Spertsyan (c)
MF	88	(Russia) Nikita Krivtsov		(substituted off) 78'
MF	11	(Angola) João Batxi		(substituted off) 67'
MF	53	(Russia) Aleksandr Chernikov		(substituted off) 67'
FW	9	(Colombia) Jhon Córdoba	(yellow card) 90'
FW	7	(Brazil) Victor Sá		(substituted off) 75'
Substitutes:
GK	16	(Russia) Aleksandr Koryakin
GK	34	(Russia) Daniil Golikov
DF	5	(Brazil) Jubal
FW	14	(Brazil) Gustavo Furtado		(substituted in) 67'
DF	98	(Russia) Sergei Petrov		(substituted in) 67'
DF	2	(Russia) Vitali Stezhko
MF	8	(Russia) Danila Kozlov		(substituted in) 78'
FW	94	(Russia) Dmitry Kuchugura
MF	6	(Cape Verde) Kevin Pina		(substituted in) 67'
FW	90	(Nigeria) Moses Cobnan	(red card) 90'	(substituted in) 75'
FW	40	(Nigeria) Olakunle Olusegun
Manager:
(Russia) Murad Musayev

GK	35	(Russia) Igor Akinfeev (c)
DF	4	(Brazil) Willyan
MF	3	(Russia) Danil Krugovoy		(substituted off) 65'
DF	78	(Russia) Igor Diveyev	(yellow card) 18'
DF	27	(Brazil) Moisés
DF	22	(Serbia) Milan Gajić
MF	17	(Russia) Kirill Glebov		(substituted off) 83'
MF	10	(Russia) Ivan Oblyakov
MF	31	(Russia) Matvey Kislyak
FW	11	(Russia) Tamerlan Musayev		(substituted off) 78'
FW	8	(Belarus) Artyom Shumansky		(substituted off) 78'
Substitutes:
GK	49	(Russia) Vladislav Torop
MF	7	(Brazil) Matheus Alves
DF	68	(Russia) Mikhail Ryadno
DF	13	(Brazil) Khellven		(substituted in) 83'
DF	23	(Russia) Dzhamalutdin Abdulkadyrov
DF	90	(Russia) Matvey Lukin
DF	52	(Armenia) Artyom Bandikyan
MF	87	(Russia) Artyom Ponomarchuk
MF	21	(Uzbekistan) Abbosbek Fayzullaev		(substituted in) 78'
FW	88	(Russia) Artyom Serikov
FW	9	(Brazil) Alerrandro		(substituted in) 78'
FW	20	(Mali) Sékou Koïta		(substituted in) 65'
Manager:
(Switzerland) Fabio Celestini

Man of the Match: Igor Diveyev

Assistant referees:
Rustam Mukhtarov (Petrozavodsk)
Konstantin Shalamberidze (Moscow)
Fourth official:
Ivan Abrosimov (St. Petersburg)
VAR:
Yevgeny Bulanov (Saransk)
AVAR:
Roman Galimov (Ulan-Ude)
Inspector:
Anatoly Tsvetnov (Moscow)

**Match rules**

- 90 minutes
- No extra time
- Penalty shoot-out if scores still level
- Eleven named substitutes
- Maximum of five substitutions
