= Danil Krugovoy =

Russian footballer (born 1998)

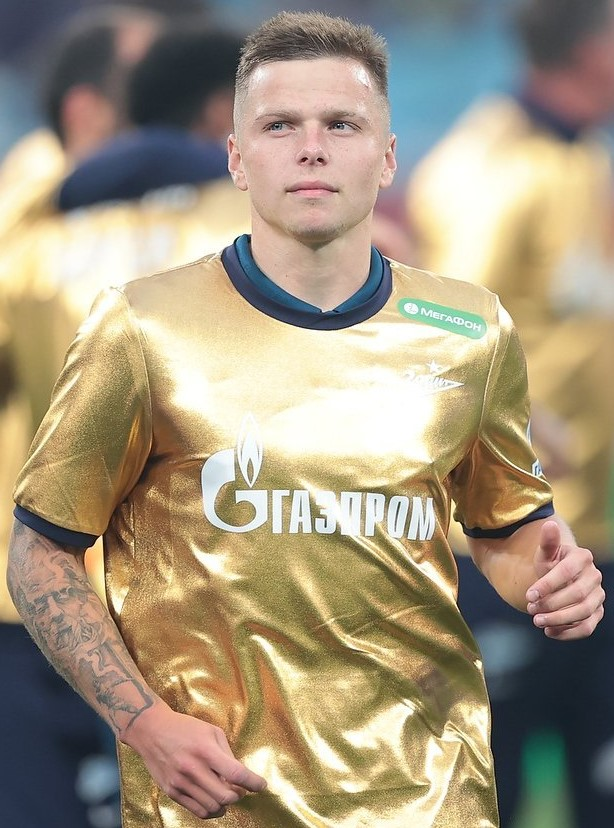
- Krugovoy in 2022

Personal information
- Full name: Danil Vladislavovich Krugovoy
- Date of birth: 28 May 1998 (age 28)
- Place of birth: Gatchina, Russia
- Height: 1.76 m (5 ft 9 in)
- Position: Left-back

Team information
- Current team: CSKA Moscow
- Number: 3

Youth career
- 2004–2017: Zenit St. Petersburg

Senior career*
Years	Team	Apps	(Gls)
2016–2018	Zenit-2 St. Petersburg	26	(1)
2018–2019	Ufa	9	(1)
2018–2019	→ Ufa-2	12	(0)
2019–2024	Zenit St. Petersburg	76	(2)
2019–2020	→ Ufa (loan)	12	(0)
2024	→ Zenit-2 St. Petersburg	9	(1)
2024–	CSKA Moscow	69	(8)

International career^{‡}
2015	Russia U17	6	(0)
2016	Russia U18	13	(1)
2016	Russia U19	3	(0)
2018	Russia U20	2	(0)
2019–2020	Russia U21	6	(1)
2022–	Russia	19	(0)
- * Club domestic league appearances and goals as of 21 November 2026 ‡ National team caps and goals as of 17 November 2026

Danil Vladislavovich Krugovoy (Russian: Дани́л Владисла́вович Кругово́й; born 28 May 1998) is a Russian football player who plays as a left-back for CSKA Moscow and Russia national team.

== Club career ==
He made his debut in the Russian Football National League for Zenit-2 St. Petersburg on 9 November 2016 in a game against FC Tyumen.

On 18 June 2018, he signed a 4-year contract with FC Ufa.

On 21 August 2019, he signed a 5-year contract with FC Zenit Saint Petersburg and was loaned back to FC Ufa for the 2019–20 season.

On 17 January 2024, Krugovoy signed a contract with CSKA Moscow until the end of the 2027–28 season, effective on 4 June 2024. Following the signing, Zenit announced that he will spend the rest of the 2023–24 season with the Russian Second League farm team FC Zenit-2 Saint Petersburg.

On 27 August 2026, CSKA extended Krugovoy's contract to June 2029.

== International career ==
He was a late substitute in one game for Russia national under-17 football team at the 2015 UEFA European Under-17 Championship. Later he started all four games the team played at the 2015 FIFA U-17 World Cup.

He was called up to the Russia national football team for the first time in October 2021 for the World Cup qualifiers against Cyprus and Croatia. He was included in the extended 41-players list of candidates. He was next called up for a training camp in March 2022, at the time of Russia's suspension from international football. He made his debut on 24 September 2022 in a friendly game against Kyrgyzstan.

== Career statistics ==
=== Club ===
As of match played 21 November 2026

Appearances and goals by club, season and competition
Club	Season	League			Cup		Continental		Other		Total	
Club	Season	Division	Apps	Goals	Apps	Goals	Apps	Goals	Apps	Goals	Apps	Goals
Zenit-2 St. Petersburg	2016–17	Russian First League	3	0	—		—		2 (Note: Appearances in the FNL Cup)	0	5	0
Zenit-2 St. Petersburg	2017–18	Russian First League	23	1	—		—		—		23	1
Zenit-2 St. Petersburg	Total		26	1	0	0	0	0	2	0	28	1
Ufa	2018–19	Russian Premier League	9	1	0	0	0	0	—		9	1
Ufa-2	2018–19	Russian Second League	12	0	—		—		—		12	0
Ufa	2019–20	Russian Premier League	12	0	1	0	—		—		13	0
Zenit St. Petersburg	2020–21	Russian Premier League	19	0	1	0	4	0	0	0	24	0
Zenit St. Petersburg	2021–22	Russian Premier League	26	2	2	0	8	0	0	0	36	2
Zenit St. Petersburg	2022–23	Russian Premier League	19	0	5	0	—		1 (Note: Appearances in the Russian Super Cup)	0	25	0
Zenit St. Petersburg	2023–24	Russian Premier League	12	0	6	0	—		—		18	0
Zenit St. Petersburg	Total		76	2	14	0	12	0	1	0	103	2
Zenit-2 St. Petersburg	2024	Russian Second League B	9	1	—		—		—		9	1
CSKA Moscow	2024–25	Russian Premier League	24	1	7	1	—		—		31	2
CSKA Moscow	2025–26	Russian Premier League	30	6	12	1	—		1	0	43	7
CSKA Moscow	2026–27	Russian Premier League	15	1	5	0	—		—		20	1
CSKA Moscow	Total		69	8	24	2	—		1	0	94	10
Career total			213	13	39	2	12	0	4	0	268	15

=== International ===
As of match played 17 November 2026

Appearances and goals by national team and year
National team	Year	Apps	Goals
Russia	2022	1	0
Russia	2024	2	0
Russia	2025	7	0
Russia	2026	9	0
Total		19	0

== Honours ==
Zenit Saint Petersburg

- Russian Premier League: 2020–21, 2021–22, 2022–23, 2023–24
- Russian Cup: 2023–24
- Russian Super Cup: 2020, 2021, 2022, 2023

CSKA Moscow

- Russian Cup: 2024–25
- Russian Super Cup: 2025

Individual

- Russian Premier League Assist of the Season: 2025–26 (against Pari Nizhny Novgorod for Matvey Kislyak goal)
