= Willyan Rocha =

Brazilian footballer (born 1995)

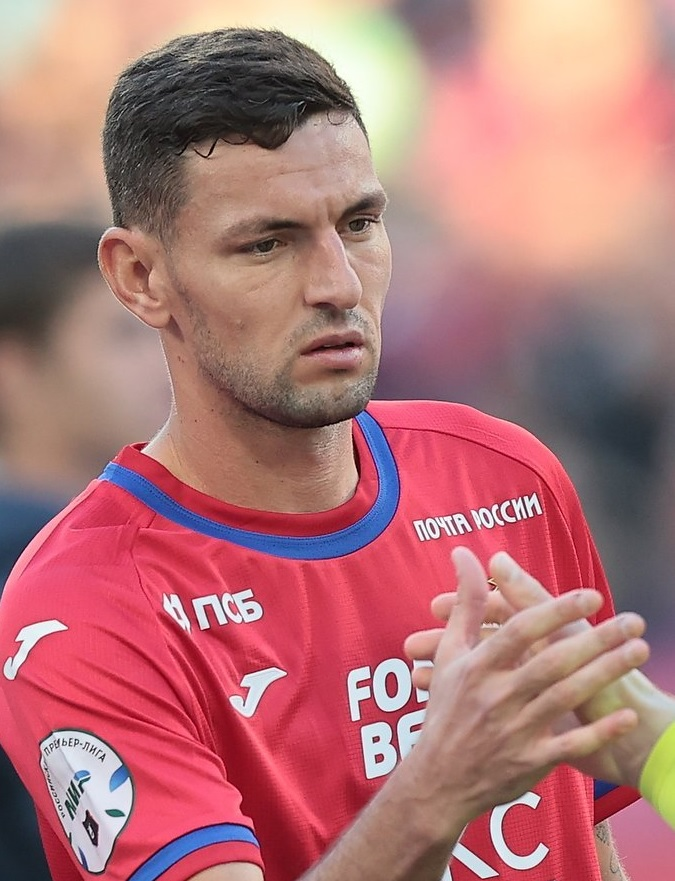
- Willyan with CSKA Moscow in 2022

Personal information
- Full name: Willyan da Silva Rocha
- Date of birth: 27 January 1995 (age 31)
- Place of birth: Muniz Freire, Brazil
- Height: 1.94 m (6 ft 4 in)
- Position: Centre-back

Team information
- Current team: Al Jazira
- Number: 4

Youth career
- 2002–2015: Desportiva Ferroviária
- 2015: → Flamengo (loan)

Senior career*
Years	Team	Apps	(Gls)
2014–2016	Desportiva Ferroviária	21	(1)
2016–2017	Grêmio	0	(0)
2017	→ Votuporanguense (loan)	6	(1)
2017–2019	Cova da Piedade	45	(3)
2019–2022	Portimonense	78	(4)
2022–2025	CSKA Moscow	74	(6)
2025–	Al Jazira	0	(0)
- * Club domestic league appearances and goals as of 21 July 2025

Willyan da Silva Rocha (born 27 January 1995) is a Brazilian footballer who plays as a centre-back for Emirati club Al Jazira.

== Club career ==
=== Early career ===
Born in Muniz Freire, Espírito Santo, Rocha joined Desportiva Ferroviária's youth setup at the age of seven. On 13 January 2015, he was loaned to the under-20 side of Flamengo for one year.

Rocha returned to Desportiva after Flamengo could not reach an agreement for a permanent transfer, and scored a brace in a friendly against Botafogo on 23 January 2016. He featured regularly during the year's Campeonato Capixaba, and moved to Grêmio on 24 July, after not renewing his contract.

On 8 December 2016, Rocha was loaned to Votuporanguense until the end of the 2017 Campeonato Paulista Série A2. He scored his only goal for the club in a 2–0 home win against Mogi Mirim on 2 April.

=== Cova da Piedade ===
On 3 July 2017, Rocha moved abroad and signed a two-year contract with Portuguese LigaPro club Cova da Piedade. He was an undisputed starter for the club, only missing out the first half of the 2018–19 campaign due to injury.

=== Portimonense ===
On 28 June 2019, Rocha signed a four-year deal with Primeira Liga side Portimonense. He made his debut in the category on 9 August, starting in a 0–0 home draw against Belenenses SAD.

Rocha scored his first goal in the Portuguese top tier on 16 June 2020, netting the opener in a 1–1 away draw against Santa Clara.

=== CSKA Moscow ===
On 1 September 2022, CSKA Moscow announced the signing of Rocha on a contract until the summer of 2025, with the option of an additional year. On 15 August 2024, the contract was extended to June 2027.

=== Al Jazira ===
On 12 August 2025, Willyam Rocha moved to Al Jazira in the United Arab Emirates.

== Career statistics ==
As of match played 11 August 2026

Appearances and goals by club, season and competition
Club	Season	League			State League		Cup		League Cup		Continental		Other		Total	
Club	Season	Division	Apps	Goals	Apps	Goals	Apps	Goals	Apps	Goals	Apps	Goals	Apps	Goals	Apps	Goals
Desportiva Ferroviária	2014	Capixaba	—		0	0	—		—		—		7 (Note: Appearance(s) in Copa Espírito Santo)	1	7	1
Desportiva Ferroviária	2016	Série D	5	1	16	0	—		—		—		—		21	1
Desportiva Ferroviária	Total		5	1	16	0	—		—		—		7	1	28	2
Votuporanguense	2017	Paulista A2	—		6	1	—		—		—		—		6	1
Cova da Piedade	2017–18	LigaPro	31	2	—		4	1	1 (Note: Appearance(s) in Taça da Liga)	0	—		—		36	3
Cova da Piedade	2018–19	LigaPro	14	1	—		0	0	1	0	—		—		15	1
Cova da Piedade	Total		45	3	—		4	1	2	0	—		—		51	4
Portimonense	2019–20	Primeira Liga	16	3	—		0	0	3	1	—		—		19	4
Portimonense	2020–21	Primeira Liga	32	0	—		1	0	—		—		—		33	0
Portimonense	2021–22	Primeira Liga	26	1	—		4	0	2	1	—		—		32	2
Portimonense	2022–23	Primeira Liga	4	0	—		—		—		—		—		4	0
Portimonense	Total		78	4	—		5	0	5	2	—		—		88	6
CSKA Moscow	2022–23	Russian Premier League	22	3	—		10	1	—		—		—		32	4
CSKA Moscow	2023–24	Russian Premier League	24	2	—		11	0	—		—		1 (Note: Appearance(s) in Russian Super Cup)	0	36	2
CSKA Moscow	2024–25	Russian Premier League	26	1	—		9	0	—		—		—		35	1
CSKA Moscow	2025–26	Russian Premier League	2	0	—		0	0	—		—		1	0	3	0
CSKA Moscow	Total		74	6	—		30	1	—		—		2	0	106	7
Al Jazira	2025–26	UAE Pro League	21	0	—		3	0	3 (Note: Appearance(s) in UAE League Cup)	0	—		—		27	0
Al Jazira	2026–27	UAE Pro League	0	0	—		0	0	0	0	1 (Note: Appearance(s) in AFC Champions League Elite)	0	—		1	0
Al Jazira	Total		21	0	—		3	0	3	0	1	0	—		28	0
Career total			223	14	22	1	42	2	10	2	1	0	9	1	307	20

== Honours ==
Desportiva Ferroviária

- Campeonato Capixaba: 2016

CSKA Moscow

- Russian Cup: 2022–23, 2024–25
- Russian Super Cup: 2025
