= Kirill Glebov =

Russian footballer

Personal information
- Full name: Kirill Artyomovich Glebov
- Date of birth: 10 November 2005 (age 21)
- Place of birth: Rudny, Kazakhstan
- Height: 1.74 m (5 ft 8 1/2 in)
- Position: Winger

Team information
- Current team: CSKA Moscow
- Number: 17

Youth career
- –2020: Start Chelyabinsk
- 2020–: CSKA Moscow

Senior career*
| Years | Team | Apps | (Gls) |
| 2023– | CSKA Moscow | 68 | (11) |

International career^{‡}
| 2021 | Russia U16 | 4 | (1) |
| 2021 | Russia U17 | 3 | (3) |
| 2022 | Russia U18 | 4 | (1) |
| 2023–2024 | Russia U21 | 3 | (1) |
| 2025– | Russia | 8 | (0) |
- * Club domestic league appearances and goals as of 21 November 2026 ‡ National team caps and goals as of 17 November 2026

Kirill Artyomovich Glebov (Russian: Кирилл Артёмович Глебов; born 10 November 2005) is a Russian football player who plays as a right winger or left winger for CSKA Moscow and the Russia national team.

== Club career ==
He made his debut in the Russian Premier League for CSKA Moscow on 5 March 2023 in a game against Sochi. On 7 December 2023, Glebov extended his contract with CSKA until the summer of 2027.

== International career ==
Glebov was first called up to the senior Russia national football team for friendlies against Jordan and Qatar in September 2025. He made his debut on 4 September 2025 against Jordan.

== Career statistics ==
As of match played 21 November 2026

Appearances and goals by club, season and competition
| Club | Season | League | | | Cup | | Other | | Total | |
| Club | Season | Division | Apps | Goals | Apps | Goals | Apps | Goals | Apps | Goals |
|---|---|---|---|---|---|---|---|---|---|---|
| CSKA Moscow | 2022–23 | Russian Premier League | 6 | 0 | 1 | 0 | — | | 7 | 0 |
| CSKA Moscow | 2023–24 | Russian Premier League | 10 | 2 | 3 | 0 | — | | 13 | 2 |
| CSKA Moscow | 2024–25 | Russian Premier League | 15 | 1 | 8 | 1 | — | | 23 | 2 |
| CSKA Moscow | 2025–26 | Russian Premier League | 22 | 5 | 10 | 2 | 1 (Note: Appearance in Russian Super Cup) | 0 | 33 | 7 |
| CSKA Moscow | 2026–27 | Russian Premier League | 15 | 3 | 5 | 0 | — | | 20 | 3 |
| CSKA Moscow | Total | | 68 | 11 | 27 | 3 | 1 | 0 | 96 | 14 |
| Career total | | | 68 | 11 | 27 | 3 | 1 | 0 | 96 | 14 |

=== International ===
As of match played 17 November 2026

Appearances and goals by national team and year
| National team | Year | Apps | Goals |
|---|---|---|---|
| Russia | 2025 | 2 | 0 |
| Russia | 2026 | 6 | 0 |
| Total | | 8 | 0 |

== Honours ==
=== Club ===
CSKA Moscow

- Russian Cup: 2022–23, 2024–25
- Russian Super Cup: 2025
