= Igor Diveyev =

Russian footballer (born 1999)

- Diveyev with Zenit Saint Petersburg in 2026

Personal information
- Full name: Igor Sergeyevich Diveyev
- Date of birth: 27 September 1999 (age 27)
- Place of birth: Ufa, Russia
- Height: 1.93 m (6 ft 4 in)
- Position: Centre-back

Team information
- Current team: Zenit St. Petersburg
- Number: 78

Youth career
- Stal Ufa
- 2015–2016: FC Ufa

Senior career*
Years	Team	Apps	(Gls)
2016–2019	FC Ufa	2	(0)
2018	→ FC Ufa-2	2	(0)
2019	→ CSKA Moscow (loan)	10	(0)
2019–2026	CSKA Moscow	148	(14)
2026–	Zenit St. Petersburg	22	(1)

International career^{‡}
2017	Russia U-19	1	(0)
2017–2018	Russia U-20	10	(1)
2019–2021	Russia U-21	13	(3)
2020–	Russia	21	(1)
- * Club domestic league appearances and goals as of 21 November 2026 ‡ National team caps and goals as of 29 September 2026

Igor Sergeyevich Diveyev (Russian: Игорь Сергеевич Дивеев; born 27 September 1999) is a Russian football player who plays as centre-back for Russian Premier League club Zenit St. Petersburg and the Russia national team.

== Career ==
=== Club ===
Diveyev made his debut in the Russian Premier League for FC Ufa on 26 August 2018 in a game against FC Zenit Saint Petersburg.

On 22 February 2019, Diveyev joined the CSKA Moscow on loan until the end of the 2018–19 season, with an option for the move to be made permanent in the summer of 2019. On 31 May 2019, CSKA Moscow announced that they had exercised their option to make Diveyev's loan deal permanent, signing him to a five-year contract.

On 9 June 2023, Diveyev extended his contract with CSKA until 2028.

On 12 July 2025, Diveyev scored the only goal of the game to win the 2025 Russian Super Cup for CSKA. He was chosen Man of the Match.

On 12 September 2025, Diveyev extended his CSKA contract to June 2029.

On 11 January 2026, Diveyev moved to Zenit St. Petersburg with a three-and-a-half-year contract.

=== International ===
In November 2020, he was called up to the Russia national football team for the first time for the games against Moldova, Turkey and Serbia. He made his debut on 12 November 2020 in a friendly against Moldova. He made his competitive debut on 18 November 2020 in a Nations League game against Serbia, Russia allowed 4 goals in the first half and Diveyev was substituted at half-time. After the game he was diagnosed with a concussion and a broken nose that he suffered early in the game but remained on the field.

On 11 May 2021, he was included in the preliminary extended 30-man squad for UEFA Euro 2020. On 2 June 2021, he was included in the final squad. In Russia's opening game against Belgium on 12 June, he came on as a half-time substitute as Russia lost 0–3. He started and played the full match in the second game against Finland on 16 June in a 1–0 victory. He again played the full match on 21 June in the last group game against Denmark as Russia lost 1–4 and was eliminated.

He scored his first international goal on 11 October 2021 in a World Cup qualifier against Slovenia.

== Career statistics ==
=== Club ===
As of match played 21 November 2026

Appearances and goals by club, season and competition
Club	Season	League			Russian Cup		Continental		Other		Total	
Club	Season	Division	Apps	Goals	Apps	Goals	Apps	Goals	Apps	Goals	Apps	Goals
Ufa	2018–19	Russian Premier League	2	0	1	0	0	0	–		3	0
Ufa-2	2018–19	Russian Second League	2	0	–		–		–		2	0
CSKA Moscow (loan)	2018–19	Russian Premier League	10	0	–		–		–		10	0
CSKA Moscow	2019–20	Russian Premier League	26	0	3	1	6 (Note: Appearances in the UEFA Europa League)	1	–		35	2
CSKA Moscow	2020–21	Russian Premier League	23	2	3	0	6	0	–		32	2
CSKA Moscow	2021–22	Russian Premier League	27	3	2	2	–		–		29	5
CSKA Moscow	2022–23	Russian Premier League	20	2	7	0	–		–		27	2
CSKA Moscow	2023–24	Russian Premier League	10	0	4	0	–		1 (Note: Appearance in Russian Super Cup)	0	15	0
CSKA Moscow	2024–25	Russian Premier League	26	5	10	1	–		–		36	6
CSKA Moscow	2025–26	Russian Premier League	16	2	2	0	–		1	1	19	3
CSKA Moscow	Total		148	14	31	4	12	1	2	1	193	20
Zenit St. Petersburg	2025–26	Russian Premier League	12	1	3	0	–		–		15	1
Zenit St. Petersburg	2026–27	Russian Premier League	10	0	2	0	–		1	0	13	0
Zenit St. Petersburg	Total		22	1	5	0	0	0	1	0	28	1
Career total			184	15	37	4	12	1	3	1	236	21

=== International ===
As of match played 29 September 2026

Appearances and goals by national team and year
National team	Year	Apps	Goals
Russia
Russia	2020	2	0
Russia	2021	12	1
Russia	2024	1	0
Russia	2025	4	0
Russia	2026	2	0
Total		21	1

International goals

Scores and results list Russia's goal tally first.

No.	Date	Venue	Opponent	Score	Result	Competition
1.	11 October 2021	Ljudski vrt, Maribor, Slovenia	Slovenia	1–0	2–1	2022 FIFA World Cup qualification

== Honours ==
CSKA Moscow

- Russian Cup: 2022–23, 2024–25
- Russian Super Cup: 2025

Zenit Saint Petersburg

- Russian Premier League: 2025–26
- Russian Super Cup: 2026

Individual

- Russian Premier League Team of the Season: 2024–25, 2025–26
- Russian Premier League Defender of the Season: 2025–26
