= Artyom Bandikyan =

Armenian footballer

Personal information
- Full name: Artyom Slavikovich Bandikyan
- Date of birth: 20 September 2005 (age 21)
- Place of birth: Moscow, Russia
- Height: 1.80 m (5 ft 11 in)
- Positions: Central midfielder; full-back

Team information
- Current team: CSKA Moscow
- Number: 52

Youth career
- –2024: CSKA Moscow

Senior career*
| Years | Team | Apps | (Gls) |
| 2025– | CSKA Moscow | 10 | (0) |

International career^{‡}
| 2023 | Armenia U-19 | 2 | (0) |
| 2024– | Armenia U-21 | 5 | (0) |
| 2025– | Armenia | 7 | (0) |
- * Club domestic league appearances and goals as of 17 May 2026 ‡ National team caps and goals as of 15 November 2026

Artyom Slavikovich Bandikyan (Armenian: Արտյոմ Բանդիկյան; Russian: Артём Славикович Бандикян; born 20 September 2005) is a football player who plays as a full-back for Russian Premier League club CSKA Moscow. Born in Russia, he represents the Armenia national team.

== Club career ==
Bandikyan become Russia Youth Champion with CSKA Moscow at the 2024 season.

Bandikyan made his debut in the Russian Premier League for CSKA Moscow on 29 March 2025 in a game against Dynamo Makhachkala.

== International career ==
On 5 November 2025, he received his first call-up to the Armenian senior national team for a 2026 FIFA World Cup qualification matches against Hungary and Portugal respectively.

On 16 November 2025, Bandikyan made his debut for the Armenian national team in a 2026 FIFA World Cup qualification match against Portugal.

== Career statistics ==
As of 29 October 2026

| Club | Season | League | | | Cup | | Other | | Total | |
| Club | Season | Division | Apps | Goals | Apps | Goals | Apps | Goals | Apps | Goals |
|---|---|---|---|---|---|---|---|---|---|---|
| CSKA Moscow | 2023–24 | Russian Premier League | 0 | 0 | 0 | 0 | – | | 0 | 0 |
| CSKA Moscow | 2024–25 | Russian Premier League | 3 | 0 | 0 | 0 | – | | 3 | 0 |
| CSKA Moscow | 2025–26 | Russian Premier League | 7 | 0 | 8 | 0 | 0 | 0 | 15 | 0 |
| CSKA Moscow | 2026–27 | Russian Premier League | 0 | 0 | 3 | 0 | – | | 3 | 0 |
| Career total | | | 10 | 0 | 11 | 0 | 0 | 0 | 21 | 0 |

=== International ===
As of 15 November 2026

Armenia
| Year | Apps | Goals |
|---|---|---|
| 2025 | 1 | 0 |
| 2026 | 6 | 0 |
| Total | 7 | 0 |

== Honours ==
CSKA Moscow

- Russian Super Cup: 2025
