= Milan Gajić (footballer, born 1996) =

Serbian footballer

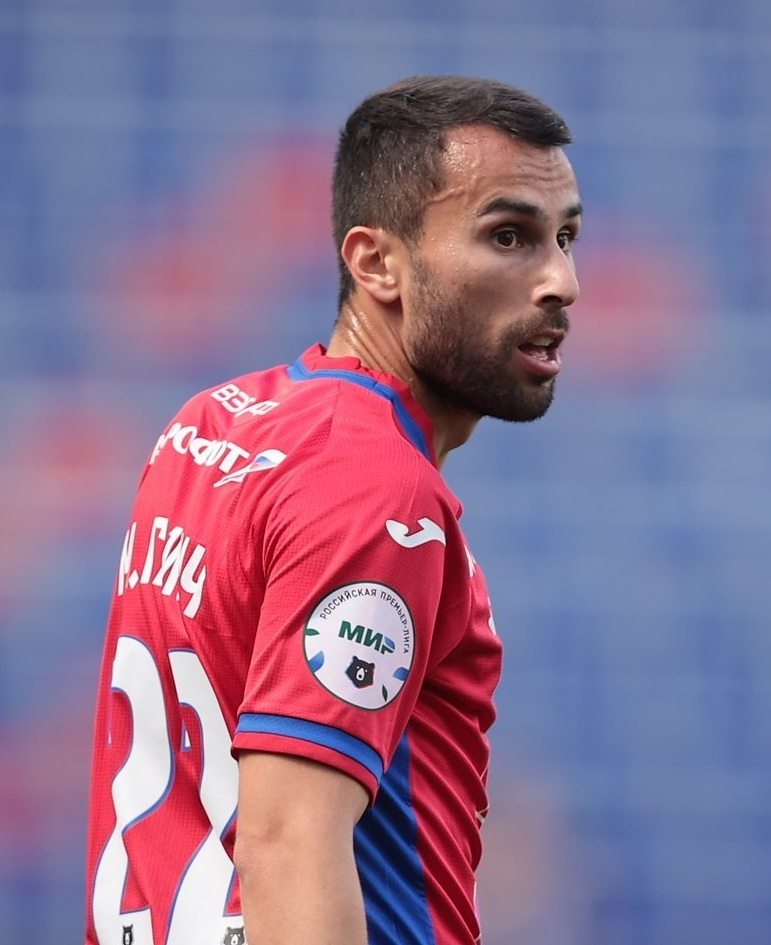
- Gajić with CSKA Moscow in 2022

Personal information
- Date of birth: 28 January 1996 (age 30)
- Place of birth: Vukovar, Croatia
- Height: 1.78 m (5 ft 10 in)
- Positions: Right-back; left-back

Team information
- Current team: CSKA Moscow
- Number: 22

Youth career
- Dinamo Pančevo
- OFK Beograd

Senior career*
Years	Team	Apps	(Gls)
2013–2015	OFK Beograd	46	(4)
2015–2019	Bordeaux	28	(1)
2019–2022	Red Star Belgrade	92	(5)
2022–	CSKA Moscow	108	(4)

International career^{‡}
2012–2013	Serbia U17	6	(0)
2014–2015	Serbia U19	11	(0)
2014–2015	Serbia U20	9	(0)
2015–2019	Serbia U21	27	(2)
2021–	Serbia	2	(0)
Medal record
Men's Football
Representing Serbia
FIFA U-20 World Cup
Gold medal – first place	2015 New Zealand	U-20 Team
- * Club domestic league appearances and goals as of 28 August 2026 ‡ National team caps and goals as of 21 March 2024

Milan Gajić (Serbian Cyrillic: Милан Гајић; born 28 January 1996) is a professional footballer who plays as a right-back or left-back for Russian club CSKA Moscow. Born in Croatia, he plays for the Serbia national team.

== Club career ==
=== Early career ===
Born in the eastern Slavonian city of Vukovar, Croatia, Gajić spent his childhood in the northern Serbian city of Pančevo where he began practicing football at the age of six with Dinamo Pančevo. He was subsequently recruited by OFK Beograd, making his senior debut in the 2013–14 campaign. Afterwards, Gajić was a first team regular for two seasons, collecting 46 league appearances and scoring four goals.

=== Bordeaux ===
On 22 July 2015, Gajić signed a five-year contract with French club Bordeaux. His transfer from OFK Beograd reportedly cost Bordeaux €800,000. Initially, Gajić saw little playing time as he was the team's second choice to starting right back Youssouf Sabaly.

=== Red Star Belgrade ===
On 4 February 2019, Gajić signed a 3.5-year contract with Red Star Belgrade. Although Red Star qualified for the 2019–20 UEFA Champions League, coach Vladan Milojević and Red Star's management opted not to register Gajić in their 23-man Champions League squad, ultimately choosing Marko Gobeljić as the starting right-back.

=== CSKA Moscow ===
On 17 June 2022, Gajić signed a three-year contract with Russian Premier League club CSKA Moscow. On 8 October 2023, he scored twice in a Main Moscow derby game against FC Spartak Moscow which ended in a 2–2 draw.

== International career ==
Gajić represented Serbia at the 2014 UEFA Under-19 Championship, as the team was eliminated in the semi-final by Portugal. He was also a member of the team that won the 2015 FIFA U-20 World Cup. In May 2017, head coach of the Serbia U21 side Nenad Lalatović included Gajić in the final squad for the 2017 UEFA Under-21 Championship in Poland.

He made his debut for Serbia national football team on 24 March 2021 in a World Cup qualifier against Ireland.

== Career statistics ==
=== Club ===
As of match played 1 September 2026

Appearances and goals by club, season and competition
Club	Season	League			Cup		Europe		Other		Total	
Club	Season	Division	Apps	Goals	Apps	Goals	Apps	Goals	Apps	Goals	Apps	Goals
OFK Beograd	2013–14	Serbian SuperLiga	22	2	5	1	0	0	—		27	3
OFK Beograd	2014–15	Serbian SuperLiga	24	2	1	0	0	0	—		25	2
OFK Beograd	Total		46	4	6	1	0	0	0	0	52	5
Bordeaux	2015–16	Ligue 1	9	1	0	0	3	0	0	0	12	1
Bordeaux	2016–17	Ligue 1	14	0	4	0	0	0	3	0	21	0
Bordeaux	2017–18	Ligue 1	4	0	0	0	1	0	0	0	5	0
Bordeaux	2018–19	Ligue 1	1	0	0	0	1	0	0	0	2	0
Bordeaux	Total		28	1	4	0	5	0	3	0	40	1
Red Star Belgrade	2018–19	Serbian SuperLiga	11	1	1	0	0	0	—		12	1
Red Star Belgrade	2019–20	Serbian SuperLiga	15	1	1	0	0	0	—		16	1
Red Star Belgrade	2020–21	Serbian SuperLiga	35	2	3	0	11	1	—		49	3
Red Star Belgrade	2021–22	Serbian SuperLiga	31	1	4	0	8	0	—		43	1
Red Star Belgrade	Total		92	5	9	0	19	1	0	0	120	6
CSKA Moscow	2022–23	Russian Premier League	29	0	13	1	—		—		42	1
CSKA Moscow	2023–24	Russian Premier League	26	3	12	2	—		1 (Note: Appearance in Russian Super Cup)	0	39	5
CSKA Moscow	2024–25	Russian Premier League	21	0	10	0	—		—		31	0
CSKA Moscow	2025–26	Russian Premier League	28	1	10	1	—		1	0	39	2
CSKA Moscow	2026–27	Russian Premier League	4	0	2	0	—		—		6	0
CSKA Moscow	Total		108	4	47	4	—		2	0	157	8
Career total			274	14	66	5	24	1	5	0	369	20

=== International ===
As of 21 March 2024

Appearances and goals by national team and year
National team	Year	Apps	Goals
Serbia	2021	1	0
Serbia	2022	0	0
Serbia	2023	0	0
Serbia	2024	1	0
Total		2	0

== Honours ==
=== Club ===
Red Star Belgrade

- Serbian SuperLiga (4): 2018–19, 2019–20, 2020–21, 2021–22
- Serbian Cup (2): 2020–21, 2021–22

CSKA Moscow

- Russian Cup (2): 2022–23, 2024–25
- Russian Super Cup: 2025

=== International ===
Serbia

- FIFA U-20 World Cup: 2015
