= Moisés (footballer, born 1995) =

Brazilian footballer

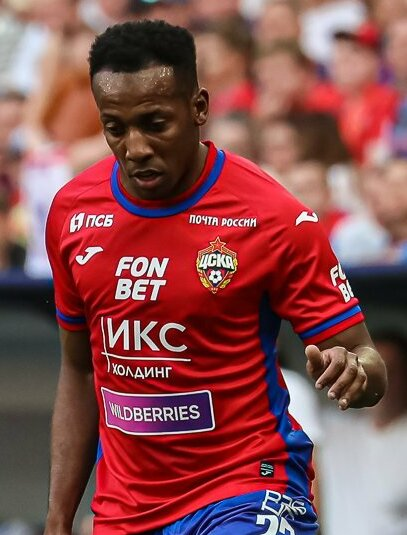
- Moisés with CSKA Moscow in 2022

Personal information
- Full name: Moisés Roberto Barbosa
- Date of birth: 11 March 1995 (age 31)
- Place of birth: São Paulo, Brazil
- Height: 1.82 m (5 ft 11 1/2 in)
- Positions: Left-back; centre-back

Team information
- Current team: CSKA Moscow
- Number: 27

Youth career
- Comercial-SP
- 2012: → Internacional (loan)

Senior career*
Years	Team	Apps	(Gls)
2013	Comercial-SP	0	(0)
2014	Batatais	7	(0)
2014–2015	Madureira	8	(0)
2015–2018	Corinthians	12	(0)
2015	→ Bragantino (loan)	24	(1)
2016	→ Bahia (loan)	31	(1)
2018	→ Botafogo (loan)	38	(0)
2019–2021	Bahia	37	(2)
2020–2021	→ Internacional (loan)	68	(0)
2022–2023	Internacional	15	(2)
2022–2023	→ CSKA Moscow (loan)	24	(0)
2023–	CSKA Moscow	73	(6)
- * Club domestic league appearances and goals as of 15 August 2026

Moisés Roberto Barbosa (born 11 March 1995), simply known as Moisés, is a Brazilian footballer who plays as a left-back or centre-back for CSKA Moscow.

== Club career ==
=== Early career ===
Born in São Paulo, Moisés finished his formation with Comercial-SP. He made his senior debut for the side on 13 July 2013, starting in a 0–0 home draw against XV de Piracicaba for the year's Copa Paulista.

Moisés subsequently represented Batatais and Madureira, impressing with the latter during the 2015 Campeonato Carioca.

=== Corinthians and loans ===
On 14 May 2015, it was announced that Moisés signed an 18-month contract with Corinthians, being immediately loaned to Série B side Bragantino until the end of the year. He scored his first goal as a senior on 30 October of that year, netting the game's only in an away success over Atlético Goianiense.

Returning to his parent club ahead of the 2016 season, Moisés moved to Bahia on 19 February 2016, also in a temporary deal. A regular starter, he contributed with 25 league appearances and one goal as his side achieved top level promotion.

Moisés made his debut for Corinthians on 4 February 2017, starting in a 1–0 Campeonato Paulista away win against São Bento.

=== CSKA Moscow ===
On 4 August 2022, Moisés joined Russian Premier League club PFC CSKA Moscow on loan. On 17 June 2023, CSKA exercised their purchase option and made the transfer permanent, signing a three-year contract with Moisés with an option to extend for an additional year. On 10 October 2025, his contract was extended to June 2029.

== Career statistics ==
As of match played 15 August 2026

Appearances and goals by club, season and competition
Club	Season	League			State League		Cup		Continental		Other		Total	
Club	Season	Division	Apps	Goals	Apps	Goals	Apps	Goals	Apps	Goals	Apps	Goals	Apps	Goals
Comercial-SP	2013	Paulista A2	—		0	0	—		—		9 (Note: Appearance(s) in Copa Paulista)	0	9	0
Batatais	2014	Paulista A2	—		7	0	—		—		—		7	0
Madureira	2014	Série C	0	0	—		—		—		5 (Note: Appearance(s) in Copa Rio)	0	5	0
Madureira	2015	Série C	0	0	8	0	2	0	—		—		10	0
Madureira	Total		0	0	8	0	2	0	—		5	0	15	0
Bragantino	2015	Série B	24	1	—		—		—		—		24	1
Bahia	2016	Série B	25	1	6	0	2	0	—		3 (Note: Appearance(s) in Copa do Nordeste)	0	36	1
Corinthians	2017	Série A	4	0	8	0	0	0	1 (Note: Appearance(s) in Copa Sudamericana)	0	—		13	0
Botafogo	2018	Série A	27	0	11	0	0	0	2	0	—		40	0
Bahia	2019	Série A	30	0	7	2	9	0	2	0	7	0	55	2
Internacional (loan)	2020	Série A	26	0	8	0	3	1	4 (Note: Appearance(s) in Copa Libertadores)	0	—		41	1
Internacional (loan)	2021	Série A	26	0	8	0	2	0	7	0	—		43	0
Internacional (loan)	Total		48	0	16	0	5	1	11	0	—		84	1
Internacional	2022	Série A	8	2	7	0	1	0	3	0	—		19	2
CSKA Moscow (loan)	2022–23	Premier Liga	24	0	—		12	1	—		—		36	1
CSKA Moscow	2023–24	Premier Liga	24	1	—		9	0	—		1 (Note: Appearance in Russian Super Cup)	0	34	1
CSKA Moscow	2024–25	Premier Liga	25	3	—		12	0	—		—		37	3
CSKA Moscow	2025–26	Premier Liga	21	2	—		9	0	—		1	0	31	2
CSKA Moscow	2026–27	Premier Liga	3	0	—		0	0	—		—		3	0
CSKA Moscow	Total		73	6	—		30	0	—		2	0	105	6
Career total			267	10	70	2	61	2	19	0	26	0	443	14

== Honours ==
Corinthians

- Campeonato Brasileiro Série A: 2017
- Campeonato Paulista: 2017

Botafogo

- Campeonato Carioca: 2018

Bahia

- Campeonato Baiano: 2019

CSKA Moscow

- Russian Cup: 2022–23, 2024–25
- Russian Super Cup: 2025

=== Individual ===
- Russian Premier League Team of the Season: 2022–23
