= Artyom Shumansky =

Belarusian footballer

Personal information
- Full name: Artyom Olegovich Shumansky
- Date of birth: 25 November 2004 (age 21)
- Place of birth: Vitebsk, Belarus
- Height: 1.85 m (6 ft 1 in)
- Position: Forward

Team information
- Current team: Akron Tolyatti (on loan from CSKA Moscow)
- Number: 99

Youth career
- 2020–2021: BATE Borisov

Senior career*
Years	Team	Apps	(Gls)
2021–2022	BATE Borisov	24	(4)
2023–2024	Aris Limassol	17	(3)
2024–	CSKA Moscow	14	(1)
2026	→ Krylia Sovetov Samara (loan)	10	(0)
2026–	→ Akron Tolyatti (loan)	8	(2)

International career^{‡}
2021–2022	Belarus U19	6	(2)
2022–	Belarus U21	13	(2)
2024–	Belarus	11	(3)
- * Club domestic league appearances and goals as of 21 November 2026 ‡ National team caps and goals as of 15 November 2026

Artyom Olegovich Shumansky (Belarusian: Арцём Алегавіч Шуманскі; Russian: Артём Олегович Шуманский; born 25 November 2004) is a Belarusian professional footballer who plays as a forward for Russian club Akron Tolyatti on loan from CSKA Moscow, and the Belarus national team.

== Club career ==
On 18 June 2024, Shumansky signed a five-year contract with Russian Premier League club CSKA Moscow.

On 30 January 2026, he moved on loan to Krylia Sovetov Samara until the end of the 2025–26 season. On 10 September 2026, Shumansky was loaned by Akron Tolyatti.

== International career ==
He has represented Belarus internationally at the U19 and U21 levels.

Shumansky made his debut for the senior Belarus national team on 26 March 2024 in a friendly against Malta.

== Career statistics ==
=== Club ===
As of match played 21 November 2026

Appearances and goals by club, season and competition
Club	Season	League			National cup		Continental		Other		Total	
Club	Season	Division	Apps	Goals	Apps	Goals	Apps	Goals	Apps	Goals	Apps	Goals
BATE Borisov	2021	Belarusian Premier League	2	0	1	0	0	0	0	0	3	0
BATE Borisov	2022	Belarusian Premier League	22	4	6	1	1 (Note: Appearance in the UEFA Europa Conference League)	0	1 (Note: Appearance in the Belarusian Super Cup)	0	30	5
BATE Borisov	Total		24	4	7	1	1	0	1	0	33	5
Aris Limassol	2022–23	Cypriot First Division	1	0	0	0	—		—		1	0
Aris Limassol	2023–24	Cypriot First Division	16	3	1	0	0	0	0	0	17	3
Aris Limassol	Total		17	3	1	0	0	0	0	0	18	3
CSKA Moscow	2024–25	Russian Premier League	5	1	4	0	—		—		9	1
CSKA Moscow	2025–26	Russian Premier League	9	0	4	1	—		1 (Note: Appearance in Russian Super Cup)	0	14	1
CSKA Moscow	Total		14	1	8	1	0	0	1	0	23	2
Krylia Sovetov Samara (loan)	2025–26	Russian Premier League	10	0	2	0	—		—		12	0
Akron Tolyatti (loan)	2026–27	Russian Premier League	8	2	2	1	—		—		10	3
Career total			73	10	20	3	1	0	2	0	96	13

=== International ===
As of match played 15 November 2026

Appearances and goals by national team and year
National team	Year	Apps	Goals
Belarus	2024	1	0
Belarus	2025	2	0
Belarus	2026	8	3
Total		11	3

Scores and results list Belarus goal tally first, score column indicates score after each Shumansky goal

List of international goals scored by Artyom Shumansky
No.	Date	Venue	Opponent	Score	Result	Competition
1	5 June 2026	National Football Stadium, Minsk, Belarus	Syria	3–0	4–1	Friendly
2	3 October 2026	Illovszky Rudolf Stadion, Budapest, Hungary	San Marino	2–0	4–0	2026–27 UEFA Nations League C
3	6 October 2026	Illovszky Rudolf Stadion, Budapest, Hungary	Finland	1–0	1–0	2026–27 UEFA Nations League C

== Honours ==
BATE Borisov

- Belarusian Super Cup: 2022

CSKA Moscow

- Russian Cup: 2024–25
- Russian Super Cup: 2025
