= Ivan Oblyakov =

Russian footballer (born 1998)

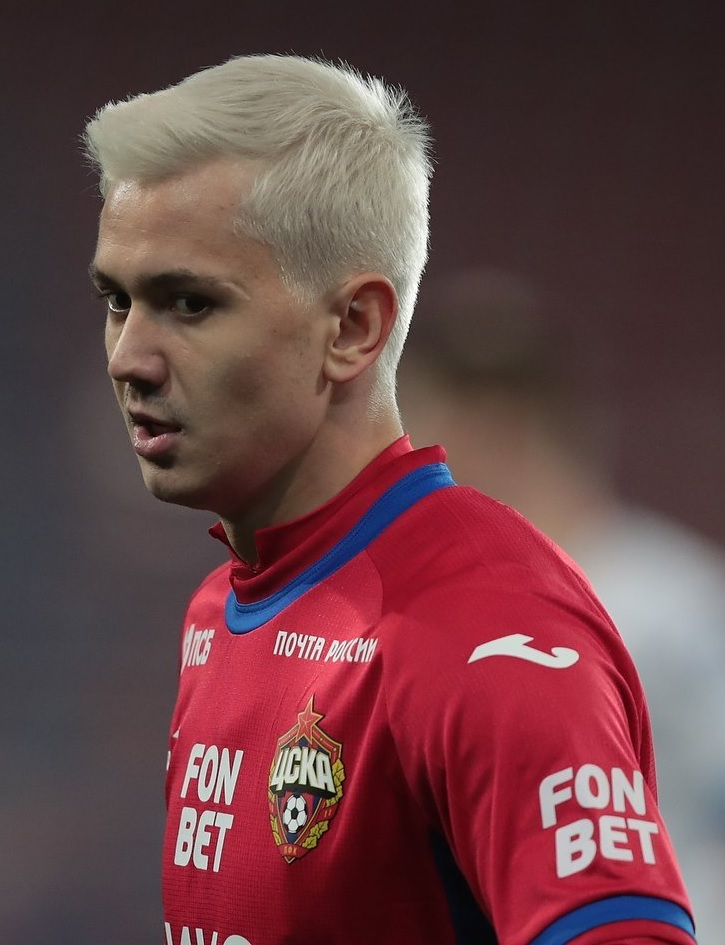
- Oblyakov with CSKA Moscow in 2022

Personal information
- Full name: Ivan Sergeyevich Oblyakov
- Date of birth: 5 July 1998 (age 28)
- Place of birth: Vyndin Ostrov, Leningrad Oblast, Russia
- Height: 1.76 m (5 ft 9 in)
- Position: Midfielder

Team information
- Current team: CSKA Moscow
- Number: 10

Youth career
- 2008–2016: SCYSSOR Zenit

Senior career*
Years	Team	Apps	(Gls)
2016–2018	Ufa	45	(3)
2018–	CSKA Moscow	235	(40)

International career^{‡}
2016	Russia U-18	8	(3)
2016	Russia U-19	4	(1)
2017–2021	Russia U-21	30	(6)
2020–	Russia	24	(5)
- * Club domestic league appearances and goals as of 21 November 2026 ‡ National team caps and goals as of 17 November 2026

Ivan Sergeyevich Oblyakov (Russian: Иван Сергеевич Обляков; born 5 July 1998) is a Russian professional footballer who plays as a midfielder for CSKA Moscow and the Russia national team. He plays mainly as a central midfielder, but can also operate as an attacking midfielder and on the left flank.

== Club career ==
=== Ufa ===
Born in Leningrad Oblast, Oblyakov joined SCYSSOR Zenit aged nine. In January 2016, Oblyakov made his breakthrough performance at the Granatkin Memorial youth tournament, helping the Saint Petersburg U-18 team reach the second place. He finished the tournament with six goals and won the Best Player of the Tournament award.

On 28 June 2016, Oblyakov joined Russian Premier League club Ufa on a long-term contract. He made his debut coming as a second half substitute in a 0–2 loss to Ural in their first match of the 2016–17 Russian Premier League. On 9 April 2017, Oblyakov scored his first career goal in a 1–3 home loss to Spartak Moscow.

The following season, Oblyakov scored two goals in 20 matches, helping Ufa finish in sixth place, their highest league finish to date. On 26 July 2018, he made his debut in UEFA club competitions, starting in a goalless draw with Slovenian side Domžale in the UEFA Europa League qualifying. Two weeks later, he scored a winning goal in a 2–1 victory over Luxembourgish club Progrès Niederkorn.

=== CSKA Moscow ===
On 31 August 2018, Oblyakov signed for CSKA Moscow in the last day of the summer transfer window on a five-year deal for a reported fee of €4 million. Here, he reunited with manager Viktor Goncharenko who gave Oblyakov his senior debut while at Ufa. On the next day after joining, Oblyakov made his club debut as a 61st-minute substitute in a 4–0 win against Ural.

On 18 August 2022, Oblyakov extended his contract with CSKA to 2027. Oblyakov was chosen as Russian Premier League player of the month for April 2023. On 29 December 2025, Oblyakov extended his CSKA contract to June 2030.

== International career ==
On 23 May 2019, Oblyakov was first called up to the Russia national team for UEFA Euro 2020 qualifying matches against San Marino and Cyprus in June. A year and a half later, he made his debut for senior team in a friendly match against Moldova on 12 November 2020.

On 18 November 2020, Oblyakov made his competitive debut coming as a half time substitute for Anton Miranchuk in a 0–5 loss to Serbia in the UEFA Nations League.

== Career statistics ==
=== Club ===
As of match played 21 November 2026

Appearances and goals by club, season and competition
Club	Season	League			Russian Cup		Continental		Other		Total	
Club	Season	Division	Apps	Goals	Apps	Goals	Apps	Goals	Apps	Goals	Apps	Goals
Ufa	2016–17	Russian Premier League	20	1	2	0	—		—		22	1
Ufa	2017–18	Russian Premier League	20	2	1	0	—		—		21	2
Ufa	2018–19	Russian Premier League	5	0	0	0	6 (Note: Appearances in UEFA Europa League)	1	—		11	1
Ufa	Total		45	3	3	0	6	1	0	0	54	4
CSKA Moscow	2018–19	Russian Premier League	23	3	0	0	6 (Note: Appearances in UEFA Champions League)	0	—		29	3
CSKA Moscow	2019–20	Russian Premier League	28	4	3	0	6	0	—		37	4
CSKA Moscow	2020–21	Russian Premier League	27	1	3	0	6	0	—		36	1
CSKA Moscow	2021–22	Russian Premier League	29	1	3	0	—		—		32	1
CSKA Moscow	2022–23	Russian Premier League	28	8	13	0	—		—		41	8
CSKA Moscow	2023–24	Russian Premier League	27	3	11	1	—		0	0	38	4
CSKA Moscow	2024–25	Russian Premier League	29	7	12	0	—		—		41	7
CSKA Moscow	2025–26	Russian Premier League	29	6	12	3	—		1 (Note: Appearance in Russian Super Cup)	0	42	9
CSKA Moscow	2026–27	Russian Premier League	15	7	5	1	—		—		20	8
CSKA Moscow	Total		235	40	62	5	18	0	1	0	316	45
Career total			280	43	65	5	24	1	1	0	370	49

=== International ===
As of match played 17 November 2026

Appearances and goals by national team and year
National team	Year	Apps	Goals
Russia	2020	2	0
Russia	2023	5	2
Russia	2024	4	3
Russia	2025	4	0
Russia	2026	9	0
Total		24	5

==== International goals ====
Scores and results list Russia's goal tally first.

No.	Date	Venue	Opponent	Score	Result	Competition
1	16 October 2023	Mardan Sports Complex, Aksu, Turkey	Kenya	2–2	2–2	Friendly
2	20 November 2023	Volgograd Arena, Volgograd, Russia	Cuba	1–0	8–0	Friendly
3	7 June 2024	Dinamo Stadium, Minsk, Belarus	Belarus	1–0	4–0	Friendly
4	15 November 2024	Krasnodar Stadium, Krasnodar, Russia	Brunei	1–0	11–0	Friendly
5	15 November 2024	Krasnodar Stadium, Krasnodar, Russia	Brunei	4–0	11–0	Friendly

== Honours ==
=== Club ===
CSKA Moscow

- Russian Cup: 2022–23, 2024–25
- Russian Super Cup: 2025

=== Individual ===
- Russian Premier League player of the month: September 2026.
- Russian Premier League goal of the month: October 2026 (against Rodina, 11 October).
