= Alerrandro =

Brazilian footballer (born 2000)

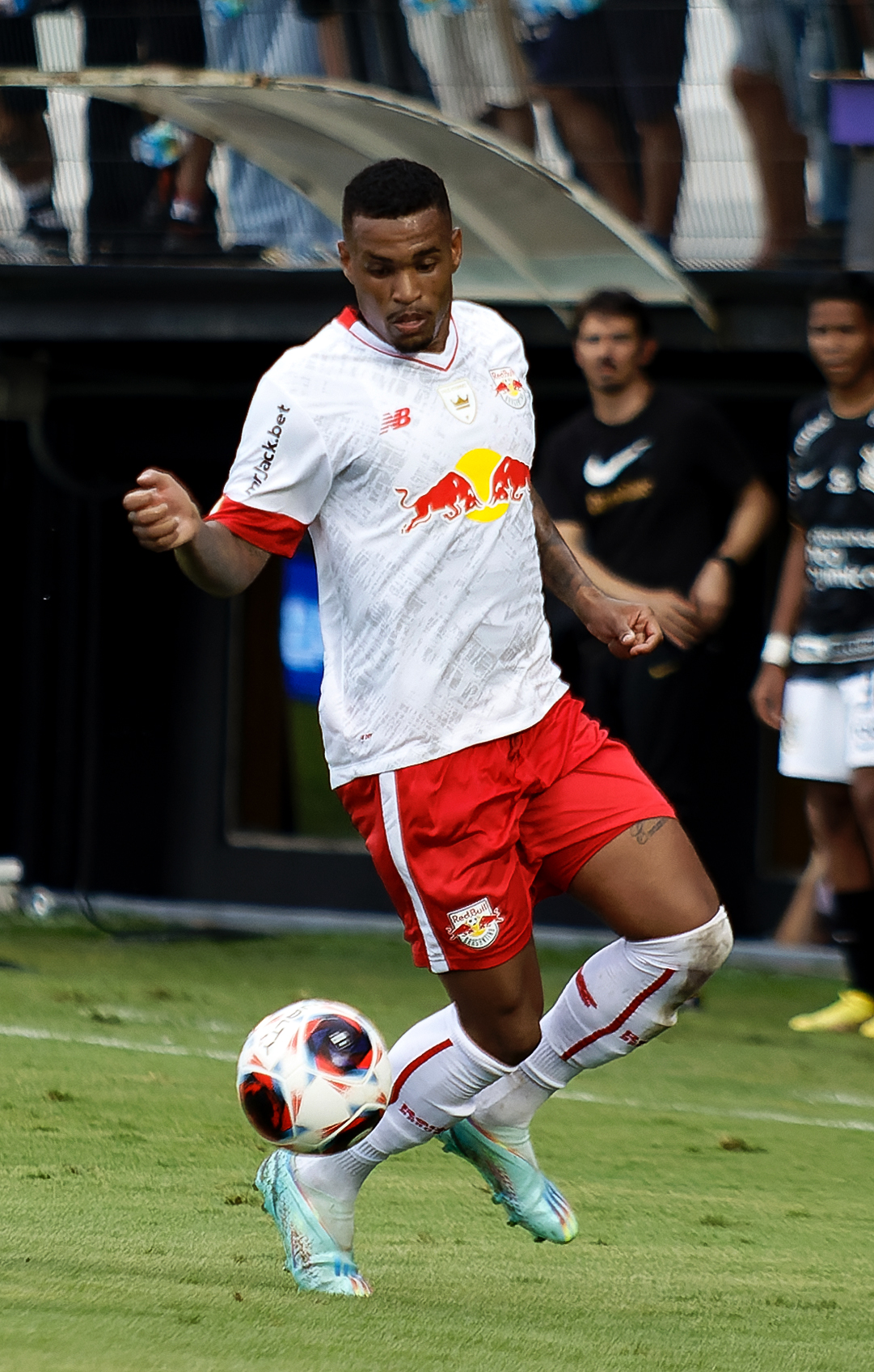
- Alerrandro with Red Bull Bragantino in 2023

Personal information
- Full name: Alerrandro Barra Mansa Realino de Souza
- Date of birth: 12 January 2000 (age 26)
- Place of birth: Lavras, Brazil
- Height: 1.76 m (5 ft 9 1/2 in)
- Position: Forward

Team information
- Current team: Internacional (on loan from CSKA Moscow)
- Number: 9

Youth career
- 2014–2018: Atlético Mineiro

Senior career*
Years	Team	Apps	(Gls)
2018–2019	Atlético Mineiro	29	(10)
2020–2025	Red Bull Bragantino	100	(24)
2024	→ Vitória (loan)	44	(20)
2025–	CSKA Moscow	21	(1)
2026–	→ Internacional (loan)	14	(2)

International career^{‡}
2017	Brazil U17	3	(1)
- * Club domestic league appearances and goals as of 8 April 2026 ‡ National team caps and goals as of 11 June 2018

Alerrandro Barra Mansa Realino de Souza (born 12 January 2000), simply known as Alerrandro, is a Brazilian footballer who plays as a forward for Internacional on loan from Russian club CSKA Moscow.

== Career ==
=== Red Bull Bragantino ===
On 29 November 2019 Red Bull Bragantino signed Alerrandro from Atlético Mineiro in a €3 million transfer.

=== CSKA Moscow ===
On 17 February 2025, Alerrando signed a contract with Russian club CSKA Moscow for three seasons with an optional fourth season.

On 30 January 2026, he moved on loan to Internacional until the end of 2026.

== Career statistics ==
=== Club ===
As of 7 December 2025

Club	Season	League			State League		Cup		Continental		Other		Total	
Club	Season	Division	Apps	Goals	Apps	Goals	Apps	Goals	Apps	Goals	Apps	Goals	Apps	Goals
Atlético Mineiro	2018	Série A	8	0	2 (Note: Appearances in the Campeonato Mineiro.)	0	1	0	1 (Note: Appearances in the Copa Sudamericana.)	0	—		12	0
Atlético Mineiro	2019	Série A	10	2	9	8	3	0	7 (Note: Three appearances and two goals in the Copa Libertadores, four appearances and one goal in the Copa Sudamericana.)	3	—		29	13
Atlético Mineiro	Total		18	2	11	8	4	0	8	3	—		41	13
Red Bull Bragantino	2020	Série A	16	5	9	0	0	0	—		—		25	5
Red Bull Bragantino	2021	Série A	23	4	1	0	1	0	4	0	—		29	4
Red Bull Bragantino	2022	Série A	20	6	10	3	1	4	0	0	—		35	9
Red Bull Bragantino	2023	Série A	14	1	13	5	2	1	4	1	—		33	8
Red Bull Bragantino	Total		73	16	27	8	4	1	12	1	—		116	26
Vitória	2024	Série A	34	15	10	5	2	0	0	0	6	1	52	21
CSKA Moscow	2024–25	Russian Premier League	6	0	—		1	0	—		—		7	0
CSKA Moscow	2025–26	Russian Premier League	15	1	—		5	1	—		1 (Note: Appearance in Russian Super Cup)	0	21	2
CSKA Moscow	Total		21	1	—		6	1	0	0	1	0	28	2
Career total			185	43	48	21	16	2	20	4	7	1	232	62

== Honours ==
Vitoria

- Campeonato Baiano: 2024

CSKA Moscow

- Russian Cup: 2024–25
- Russian Super Cup: 2025

Brazil U17

- South American U-17 Championship: 2017

Individual

- 2024 Campeonato Brasileiro Série A top scorer: 15 goals
- 2024 Campeonato Baiano top scorer: 5 goals
