= Tamerlan Musayev =

Russian footballer (born 2001)

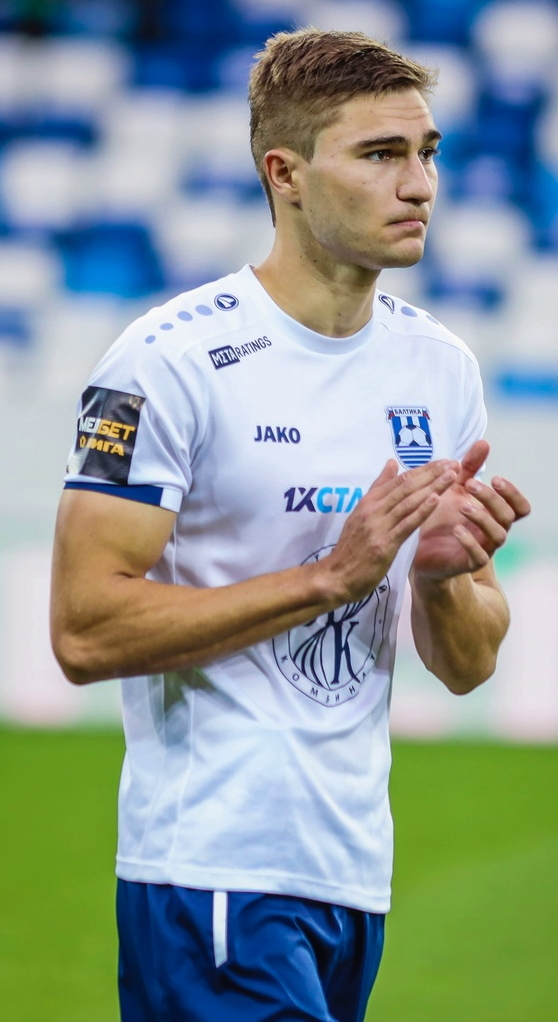
- Musayev with Baltika Kaliningrad in 2022

Personal information
- Full name: Tamerlan Abdulganiyevich Musayev
- Date of birth: 29 July 2001 (age 25)
- Place of birth: Sultan-Yangi-Yurt, Kizilyurtovsky District, Dagestan, Russia
- Height: 1.86 m (6 ft 1 in)
- Position: Forward

Team information
- Current team: CSKA Moscow
- Number: 11

Youth career
- 2011–2014: DYuSSh Kizilyurt
- 2014–2015: CSKA Moscow
- 2015–2016: Lokomotiv Moscow
- 2017: Torpedo Moscow
- 2018–2019: Anzhi Makhachkala
- 2019: Arsenal Tula

Senior career*
Years	Team	Apps	(Gls)
2020–2023	Baltika Kaliningrad	70	(17)
2021	→ Volga Ulyanovsk (loan)	12	(4)
2021	→ Baltika-BFU Kaliningrad	5	(2)
2021	→ KAMAZ (loan)	16	(0)
2023–	CSKA Moscow	85	(17)

International career^{‡}
2023	Russia U-23	2	(0)
2024–	Russia	6	(2)
- * Club domestic league appearances and goals as of 21 November 2026 ‡ National team caps and goals as of 7 September 2025

Tamerlan Abdulganiyevich Musayev (Russian: Тамерлан Абдулганиевич Мусаев; born 29 July 2001) is a Russian professional footballer who plays for CSKA Moscow and the Russia national team.

== Club career ==
He made his debut in the Russian Football National League for Baltika Kaliningrad on 2 August 2020 in a game against Krylia Sovetov Samara, he substituted Maksim Kuzmin in the 90th minute.

Musayev made his Russian Premier League debut for Baltika Kaliningrad on 23 July 2023 in a game against Sochi.

On 19 December 2023, Musayev signed a contract with CSKA Moscow until June 2028.

== International career ==
Musayev was first called up to the Russia national football team for a training camp in September 2023.

He made his debut on 5 September 2024 in a 2024 LPBank Cup game against Vietnam and scored a goal in 3–0 victory.

== Personal life ==
Musayev is an ethnic Kumyk.

== Career statistics ==
=== Club ===
As of match played 21 November 2026.

Appearances and goals by club, season and competition
Club	Season	League			Cup		Other		Total	
Club	Season	Division	Apps	Goals	Apps	Goals	Apps	Goals	Apps	Goals
Baltika	2019–20	Russian First League	0	0	—		—		0	0
Baltika	2020–21	Russian First League	12	0	1	0	—		13	0
Baltika	2021–22	Russian First League	11	6	2	0	—		13	6
Baltika	2022–23	Russian First League	29	9	—		—		29	9
Baltika	2023–24	Russian Premier League	18	2	7	2	—		25	4
Baltika	Total		70	17	10	2	—		80	19
Volga Ulyanovsk (loan)	2020–21	Russian Second League	12	4	—		—		12	4
Baltika-BFU (loan)	2021–22	Russian Second League	5	2	—		—		5	2
KAMAZ Naberezhnye Chelny (loan)	2021–22	Russian First League	16	0	1	1	—		17	1
CSKA Moscow	2023–24	Russian Premier League	12	5	5	1	—		17	6
CSKA Moscow	2024–25	Russian Premier League	30	7	13	3	—		43	10
CSKA Moscow	2025–26	Russian Premier League	29	4	11	2	1 (Note: Appearance in Russian Super Cup)	0	41	6
CSKA Moscow	2026–27	Russian Premier League	14	1	4	0	—		18	1
CSKA Moscow	Total		85	17	33	6	1	0	119	23
Career total			188	40	44	9	1	0	233	49

=== International ===
As of match played 7 September 2025

Appearances and goals by national team and year
National team	Year	Apps	Goals
Russia	2024	3	2
Russia	2025	3	0
Total		6	2

=== International goals ===
No.	Date	Venue	Opponent	Score	Result	Competition
1.	5 September 2024	Mỹ Đình National Stadium, Hanoi, Vietnam	Vietnam	3–0	3–0	2024 LPBank Cup
2.	15 November 2024	Krasnodar Stadium, Krasnodar, Russia	Brunei	7–0	11–0	Friendly

== Honours ==
CSKA Moscow

- Russian Cup: 2024–25
- Russian Super Cup: 2025
