= 2024–25 PFC CSKA Moscow season =

PFC CSKA Moscow
2024–25 season
- President: Yevgeni Giner
- Head coach: Marko Nikolić
- Stadium: VEB Arena
- Premier League: 3rd
- Russian Cup: Winners
- Top goalscorer: League: Tamerlan Musayev; Ivan Oblyakov (7 each); All: Tamerlan Musayev (10)
- Highest home attendance: 23,045 vs Spartak Moscow (2 November 2024)
- Lowest home attendance: 6,038 vs Rubin Kazan (30 November 2024)
- Average home league attendance: 12,238 (24 May 2025)
Home colours	Away colours	Third colours

The 2024–25 season was PFC CSKA Moscow's 114th season in existence and 32nd consecutive in the Russian Premier League, in which they finished third. They also competed in the Russian Cup, which they won for the 14th time.

== Season events ==
On 17 January 2024, CSKA announced that Danil Krugovoy would join the club on a contract until the summer of 2028, from Zenit St.Petersburg on 1 July 2024 after his contract had expired.

On 6 June, CSKA announced Marko Nikolić as their new head coach on a two-year contract.

On 18 June, CSKA announced the signing of Artyom Shumansky from Aris Limassol on a contract until the summer of 2029.

On 8 July, CSKA announced the signing of Sékou Koïta from Red Bull Salzburg on a contract until the summer of 2028. The following day, 9 July, CSKA announced the signing of Rifat Zhemaletdinov from Lokomotiv Moscow, on a contract until the end of the season with an option of extending it for an additional year.

On 30 July, CSKA announced that they had signed Amirhossein Reyvandi from KIA Football Academy on a contract until the summer of 2026, whilst also loaning him out to Bukhara in the Uzbekistan Pro League until the end of 2024.

On 1 August, Fyodor Chalov left the club to sign for Super League Greece club PAOK.

On 15 August, CSKA announced that they had extended their contract with Willyan Rocha until the summer of 2027.

On 12 September, CSKA announced the loan signing of Saúl Guarirapa from Sochi for the rest of the season, with an option to make the deal permanent. On the same day, CSKA announced that Víctor Méndez had left the club to join Krylia Sovetov for the rest of the season with an option to make the move permanent.

On 15 September, CSKA announced that Víctor Dávila had left the club to join Club América on a permanent deal.

On 26 September, CSKA announced the signing of free-agent Miralem Pjanić to a one-year contract with the option of an additional year.

On 18 December, CSKA announced that Bruno Fuchs had joined Atlético Mineiro permanently after the conditions have been fulfilled for the obligation to buy to come in effect, and the transfer became permanent.

On 27 January, CSKA announced that a FIFA imposed transfer ban had been lifted, after money owned to SC Heerenveen over the transfer of Chidera Ejuke in 2020 had been resolved after payment by Víctor Dávila as part of his move to Club América.

On 17 February, CSKA announced the signing of Alerrandro to a three-year contract with the option of a fourth, from Red Bull Bragantino.

On 6 March, CSKA announced the signing of free-agent Rodrigo Villagra, on a contract until December 2028, with the option for an additional year.

On 14 March, CSKA extended their contract with Matvey Lukin until the summer of 2027, with an option for an additional two-years.

== Squad ==
As of match played 1 June 2025

Number	Name	Nationality	Position	Date of birth (age)	Signed from	Signed in	Contract ends	Apps.	Goals
Goalkeepers
35	Igor Akinfeev (captain)	(Russia)	GK	8 April 1986 (aged 39)	Academy	2003	2026	797	0
45	Danila Bokov	(Russia)	GK	8 September 2002 (aged 22)	Academy	2021	2025	1	0
49	Vladislav Torop	(Russia)	GK	7 November 2003 (aged 21)	Academy	2019	2026	37	0
Defenders
3	Danil Krugovoy	(Russia)	DF	28 May 1998 (aged 27)	Zenit St.Petersburg	2024	2028	31	2
4	Willyan Rocha	(Brazil)	DF	27 January 1995 (aged 30)	Portimonense	2022	2027	103	7
13	Khellven	(Brazil)	DF	25 February 2001 (aged 24)	Athletico Paranaense	2023	2028	62	5
22	Milan Gajić	(Serbia)	DF	28 January 1996 (aged 29)	Red Star Belgrade	2022		112	7
27	Moisés	(Brazil)	DF	11 March 1995 (aged 30)	Internacional	2023	2026	107	5
51	Dzhamalutdin Abdulkadyrov	(Russia)	DF	23 March 2005 (aged 20)	Academy	2025		4	0
52	Artyom Bandikyan	(Armenia)	DF	20 September 2005 (aged 19)	Academy	2025		3	0
68	Mikhail Ryadno	(Russia)	DF	18 September 2005 (aged 19)	Academy	2023	2025	12	1
78	Igor Diveyev	(Russia)	DF	27 September 1999 (aged 25)	Ufa	2019		185	17
90	Matvey Lukin	(Russia)	DF	27 April 2004 (aged 21)	Academy	2022	2027 (+2)	31	2
Midfielders
5	Rodrigo Villagra	(Argentina)	MF	14 February 2001 (aged 24)	Unattached	2025	2028	0	0
6	Maksim Mukhin	(Russia)	MF	4 November 2001 (aged 23)	Lokomotiv Moscow	2021	2026	69	3
10	Ivan Oblyakov	(Russia)	MF	5 July 1998 (aged 26)	Ufa	2018		253	28
14	Yegor Ushakov	(Russia)	MF	2 December 2002 (aged 22)	Academy	2021		14	1
15	Miralem Pjanić	(Bosnia and Herzegovina)	MF	2 April 1990 (aged 35)	Unattached	2024	2025 (+1)	25	0
17	Kirill Glebov	(Russia)	MF	10 November 2005 (aged 19)	Academy	2023	2027	43	4
19	Rifat Zhemaletdinov	(Russia)	MF	20 September 1996 (aged 28)	Lokomotiv Moscow	2024	2025 (+1)	29	2
21	Abbosbek Fayzullaev	(Uzbekistan)	MF	3 October 2003 (aged 21)	Pakhtakor	2023	2026	71	8
25	Kristijan Bistrović	(Croatia)	MF	9 April 1998 (aged 27)	Slaven Belupo	2018	2025	127	10
31	Matvey Kislyak	(Russia)	MF	26 July 2005 (aged 19)	Academy	2023	2028	42	5
	Ivan Ananyev	(Russia)	MF	15 September 2006 (aged 18)	Zenit St.Petersburg	2025	2028	0	0
	Makar Pestov	(Russia)	MF	13 January 2004 (aged 21)	Academy	2022		0	0
Forwards
7	Alerrandro	(Brazil)	FW	12 January 2000 (aged 25)	Red Bull Bragantino	2024	2027 (+1)	7	0
8	Artyom Shumansky	(Belarus)	FW	25 November 2004 (aged 20)	Aris Limassol	2024	2029	9	1
9	Saúl Guarirapa	(Venezuela)	FW	18 October 2002 (aged 22)	on loan from Sochi	2024	2025	30	5
11	Tamerlan Musayev	(Russia)	FW	29 July 2001 (aged 23)	Baltika Kaliningrad	2023	2028	60	16
20	Sékou Koïta	(Mali)	FW	28 November 1999 (aged 25)	Red Bull Salzburg	2024	2027	35	5
Away on loan
38	Adolfo Gaich	(Argentina)	FW	26 February 1999 (aged 26)	San Lorenzo	2020	2025	39	3
46	Vladislav Yakovlev	(Russia)	FW	14 February 2002 (aged 23)	Academy	2021	2026	36	1
77	Ilya Agapov	(Russia)	DF	21 January 2001 (aged 24)	Pari Nizhny Novgorod	2023		33	2
86	Vladimir Shaykhutdinov	(Russia)	GK	4 June 2004 (aged 20)	Academy	2022	2026	1	0
96	Amirhossein Reyvandi	(Iran)	DF	8 March 2004 (aged 21)	KIA Football Academy	2024	2026	2	0
	Yegor Noskov	(Russia)	DF	24 March 2003 (aged 22)	Academy	2023	2026	7	0
	Andrei Savinov	(Russia)	DF	14 May 2002 (aged 23)	Academy	2021		0	0
	Sid Ahmed Aissaoui	(Algeria)	MF	11 January 2005 (aged 20)	USM Alger	2024	2026	0	0
	Maksim Sidelnikov	(Russia)	FW	9 March 2005 (aged 20)	Academy	2023		0	0
Players who left during the season
5	Saša Zdjelar	(Serbia)	MF	20 March 1995 (aged 30)	Partizan	2022	2025	96	1
7	Víctor Dávila	(Chile)	FW	4 November 1997 (aged 27)	León	2023	2027	39	6
9	Fyodor Chalov	(Russia)	FW	10 April 1998 (aged 27)	Academy	2015		263	89
23	Ilya Pomazun	(Russia)	GK	16 August 1996 (aged 28)	Academy	2012	2028	10	0
47	Renat Golybin	(Russia)	FW	30 August 2005 (aged 19)	Academy	2023		1	0
88	Víctor Méndez	(Chile)	MF	23 September 1999 (aged 25)	Unión Española	2022		70	1
	Bruno Fuchs	(Brazil)	DF	1 April 1999 (aged 26)	Internacional	2020		19	0

== Transfers ==
=== In ===
Date	Position	Nationality	Name	From	Fee	Ref.
18 June 2024	FW	(Belarus)	Artyom Shumansky	Aris Limassol	Undisclosed	
1 July 2024	DF	(Russia)	Danil Krugovoy	Zenit St.Petersburg	Free	
8 July 2024	FW	(Mali)	Sékou Koïta	Red Bull Salzburg	Undisclosed	
9 July 2024	MF	(Russia)	Rifat Zhemaletdinov	Lokomotiv Moscow	Undisclosed	
30 July 2024	DF	(Iran)	Amirhossein Reyvandi	KIA Football Academy	Undisclosed	
26 September 2024	MF	(Bosnia and Herzegovina)	Miralem Pjanić	Unattached	Free	
11 January 2025	MF	(Russia)	Ivan Ananyev	Zenit St.Petersburg	Undisclosed	
17 February 2025	FW	(Brazil)	Alerrandro	Red Bull Bragantino	Undisclosed	
6 March 2025	MF	(Argentina)	Rodrigo Villagra	Unattached	Free	

=== Loans in ===
Date from	Position	Nationality	Name	From	Date to	Ref.
12 September 2024	FW	(Venezuela)	Saúl Guarirapa	Sochi	End of season	

=== Out ===
Date	Position	Nationality	Name	To	Fee	Ref.
15 June 2024	MF	(Russia)	Nikita Yermakov	Pari Nizhny Novgorod	Undisclosed	
13 July 2024	DF	(Russia)	Vadim Karpov	Ufa	Undisclosed	
19 July 2024	DF	(Russia)	Vadim Konyukhov	Veles Moscow	Undisclosed	
1 August 2024	FW	(Russia)	Fyodor Chalov	PAOK	Undisclosed	
15 September 2024	FW	(Chile)	Víctor Dávila	Club América	End of season	
18 December 2024	DF	(Brazil)	Bruno Fuchs	Atlético Mineiro	December 2024	
27 January 2025	MF	(Chile)	Víctor Méndez	Colo-Colo	Undisclosed	
2 February 2025	GK	(Russia)	Ilya Pomazun	Spartak Moscow	Undisclosed	
3 February 2025	FW	(Russia)	Renat Golybin	KAMAZ	Undisclosed	
21 February 2025	MF	(Serbia)	Saša Zdjelar	Zenit St.Petersburg	Undisclosed	

=== Loans out ===
Date from	Position	Nationality	Name	To	Date to	Ref.
1 January 2023	DF	(Brazil)	Bruno Fuchs	Atlético Mineiro	14 December 2024	
22 June 2024	GK	(Russia)	Vladimir Shaykhutdinov	Volga Ulyanovsk	End of season	
25 June 2024	MF	(Algeria)	Sid Ahmed Aissaoui	Sheriff Tiraspol	End of season	
26 June 2024	MF	(Russia)	Andrey Savinov	Tyumen	End of season	
12 July 2024	DF	(Russia)	Yegor Noskov	SKA-Khabarovsk	End of season	
25 July 2024	DF	(Russia)	Mikhail Ryadno	Rodina Moscow	25 December 2024	
30 July 2024	DF	(Iran)	Amirhossein Reyvandi	Bukhara	31 December 2024	
13 August 2024	FW	(Argentina)	Adolfo Gaich	Antalyaspor	End of season	
12 September 2024	MF	(Chile)	Víctor Méndez	Krylia Sovetov	27 January 2025	
15 January 2025	FW	(Russia)	Maksim Sidelnikov	Veles Moscow	End of season	
16 January 2025	DF	(Russia)	Ilya Agapov	Pari NN	End of season	
21 February 2025	DF	(Iran)	Amirhossein Reyvandi	Jarun Zagreb	End of season	
21 February 2025	FW	(Algeria)	Sid Ahmed Aissaoui	MC Alger	End of season	
21 February 2025	FW	(Russia)	Vladislav Yakovlev	Urartu	End of season	

== Friendlies ==
29 June 2024	CSKA Moscow	2–1	Shinnik Yaroslavl	Khimki
17:00 MSK (UTC+3)	Chalov 17'; Musayev 83'	Report	Yakushevich 38'	Stadium: UTB-Novogorsk-Dynamo

4 July 2024 Brother's Cup	CSKA Moscow	4–0	OFK Beograd	Moscow
19:30 MSK (UTC+3)	Fayzullaev 35'; Gajić 48'; Diveyev 54'; Bistrović 90+4'	Report		Stadium: VEB Arena

7 July 2024 Brother's Cup	CSKA Moscow	3–0	Partizan	Moscow
19:30 MSK (UTC+3)	Musayev 3'; Khellven 51'; Tošić 89'	Report		Stadium: VEB Arena

13 July 2024	CSKA Moscow	2–2	Akhmat Grozny	Moscow
19:30 MSK (UTC+3)	Willyan 28'; Ryadno (yellow card) 59'; Chalov 79'	Report	Ghandri 12'; Kovachev 39'	Stadium: VEB Arena

13 October 2024	CSKA Moscow	2-2	Pari NN	Moscow
12:00 MSK (UTC+3)	Guarirapa 15'; Oblyakov (red card) 59'; Bistrović 65'	Report	Yermakov 50'; A.Mukhin (red card) 59'; Kakkoyev 69'	Stadium: Oktyabr Stadium

19 January 2025	CSKA Moscow	4-1	AGMK	Abu Dhabi, United Arab Emirates
16:30 MSK (UTC+3)	Glebov 11'; Oblyakov 18' (pen.); Koïta 74'; Shumansky 85'	Report	Giyosov 8' (pen.)

23 January 2025	Ordabasy	0-3	CSKA Moscow	Abu Dhabi, United Arab Emirates
10:00 MSK (UTC+3)	Malyi (yellow card) 83'	Report	Oblyakov 6'; Glebov 32'; Koïta 45'

31 January 2025	CSKA Moscow	1–0	Rostov	Abu Dhabi, United Arab Emirates
19:30 MSK (UTC+3)	Musayev 75'	Report		Stadium: Al Nahyan Stadium

4 February 2025	Zenit St.Petersburg	2–2 (4–1 p)	CSKA Moscow	Abu Dhabi, United Arab Emirates
19:30 MSK (UTC+3)	Mostovoy (yellow card) 23'; Glushenkov (yellow card) 29'; Douglas 49'; Sobolev 90'	Report	Zdjelar (yellow card) 43'; Willyan (yellow card) 48'; Kislyak 57'; Shumansky 88'	Stadium: Al Nahyan Stadium
	Penalties
	Sobolev (penalty scored); Cassierra (penalty scored); Akhmetov (penalty scored); Gorshkov (penalty scored)		(penalty missed) Fayzullaev; (penalty scored) Bistrović; (penalty missed) Shumansky

7 February 2025	Qingdao West Coast	1–2	CSKA Moscow	Abu Dhabi, United Arab Emirates
16:00 MSK (UTC+3)	15'	Report	Glebov 3'; Zhemaletdinov 28'

10 February 2025	Krasnodar	2–1	CSKA Moscow	Abu Dhabi, United Arab Emirates
19:30 MSK (UTC+3)	Córdoba (yellow card) 6' (goal) 51', 70'; Gazinsky (yellow card) 86'	Report	Zhemaletdinov 67'	Stadium: Al Nahyan Stadium

17 February 2025	Sochi	0–0	CSKA Moscow	Belek, Turkey
11:00 MSK (UTC+3)	Nosaty (yellow card) 84'	Report	Koïta (yellow card) 37'	Stadium: Regnum Sports Center

17 February 2025	Fakel Voronezh	1–1	CSKA Moscow	Belek, Turkey
17:00 MSK (UTC+3)	Lomovitsky 20' (yellow card) 31'; Bozhin (yellow card) 43'; Brahimi (yellow card) 75'	Report	Shumansky 37'; Musayev (yellow card) 68'; Willyan (yellow card) 79'; Kislyak (yellow card) 89'	Stadium: Regnum Sports Center

22 February 2025	Krylia Sovetov	2–4	CSKA Moscow	Belek, Turkey
11:00 MSK (UTC+3)	Khellven 27' (o.g.); Zinkovsky 78'	Report	Oblyakov 6'; Musayev 22'; Kislyak (yellow card) 30'; Koïta 31'; Shumansky 66'	Stadium: Regnum Sports Center

22 March 2025 Brother's Cup	Partizan	1–2	CSKA Moscow	Belgrade, Serbia
MSK (UTC+3)	90+8'	Report	Alerrandro 67'; Zhemaletdinov 90+1'	Stadium: Partizan Stadium

== Competitions ==
=== Overall record ===
Competition	First match	Last match	Starting round	Final position	Record							
Competition	First match	Last match	Starting round	Final position	Pld	W	D	L	GF	GA	GD	Win %
Premier League	20 July 2023	24 May 2025	Matchday 1	3rd	30	17	8	5	47	21	+26	56.67
Russian Cup	31 July 2023	1 June 2025	Group stage	Winners	13	7	4	2	15	5	+10	53.85
Total					43	24	12	7	62	26	+36	55.81

Last updated: 1 June 2025
Source: Soccerway

=== Premier League ===
==== League table ====
Pos	Team	Pld	W	D	L	GF	GA	GD	Pts
1	Krasnodar (C)	30	20	7	3	59	23	+36	67
2	Zenit Saint Petersburg	30	20	6	4	58	18	+40	66
3	CSKA Moscow	30	17	8	5	47	21	+26	59
4	Spartak Moscow	30	17	6	7	56	25	+31	57
5	Dynamo Moscow	30	16	8	6	61	35	+26	56

Source: Premier Liga
Rules for classification: 1) Points; 2) Head-to-head points; 3) Head-to-head matches won; 4) Head-to-head goal difference; 5) Head-to-head goals scored; 6) Matches won; 7) Goal difference; 8) Goals scored; 9) 2023–24 position (not applicable to final standings); 10) Play-off. Note: if teams tied on points did not play an equal number of head-to-head games, head-to-head results are not considered for the standings.
(C) Champions

==== Results summary ====
Overall								Home						Away					
Pld	W	D	L	GF	GA	GD	Pts	W	D	L	GF	GA	GD	W	D	L	GF	GA	GD
30	17	8	5	47	20	+27	59	8	3	4	25	11	+14	9	5	1	22	9	+13

Last updated: 24 May 2025.

==== Results by round ====
Round	1	2	3	4	5	6	7	8	9	10	11	12	13	14	15	16	17	18	19	20	21	22	23	24	25	26	27	28	29	30
Ground	A	A	H	A	H	H	A	H	A	H	A	A	H	H	A	H	H	A	A	H	A	H	H	A	H	A	A	H	A	H
Result	D	W	W	L	L	W	W	L	D	W	W	W	D	L	W	L	D	W	D	W	W	W	W	W	D	W	D	W	D	W
Position	10	3	3	4	7	6	5	6	6	5	4	4	5	6	6	6	6	6	6	6	6	5	4	4	4	3	3	3	3	3

Updated to match(es) played on 24 May 2025. Source:
A = Away; H = Home; W = Win; D = Draw; L = Loss
Notes:
- ^{1}

==== Matches ====
The match schedule was released on 20 June 2024.

20 July 2024 1	Rostov	0–0	CSKA Moscow	Rostov
20:00 MSK (UTC+3)	Komlichenko (yellow card) 20'; Utkin (yellow card) 49'; Melyokhin (yellow card) 90+1'	Report	Krugovoy (yellow card) 52'	Stadium: Rostov Arena; Attendance: 18,672; Referee: Sergei Karasev

27 July 2024 2	Pari NN	0–3	CSKA Moscow	Nizhny Novgorod
15:00 MSK (UTC+3)		Report	Musayev 15'; Diveyev 50'; Oblyakov 78'	Stadium: Nizhny Novgorod Stadium; Attendance: 12,612; Referee: Pavel Kukuyan

4 August 2024 3	CSKA Moscow	5–1	Orenburg	Moscow
15:30 MSK (UTC+3)	Musayev 23'; Moisés (yellow card) 26'; Diveyev 30', 59'; Oblyakov 39'; Khellven 71'; Koïta (yellow card) 90+1'	Report	Sidorov (yellow card) 25'; Rybchinsky 31'; Bašić (yellow card) 89'	Stadium: VEB Arena; Attendance: 9,959; Referee: Sergey Ivanov

10 August 2024 4	Krasnodar	2–1	CSKA Moscow	Krasnodar
20:00 MSK (UTC+3)	Pina (yellow card) 8'; Batxi 45+'; Tormena 90+'	Report	Zdjelar (yellow card) 62'; Diveyev 68'	Stadium: Krasnodar Stadium; Attendance: 27,496; Referee: Vladimir Moskalyov

18 August 2024 5	CSKA Moscow	0–1	Lokomotiv Moscow	Moscow
17:30 MSK (UTC+3)	Gajić (yellow card) 23'; Musayev (yellow card) 28'	Report	Morozov (yellow card) 30'; Karpukas (yellow card) 38'; Rakov (yellow card) 88'; Tiknizyan 90'	Stadium: VEB Arena; Attendance: 17,150; Referee: Kirill Levnikov

24 August 2024 6	CSKA Moscow	4–0	Akron Tolyatti	Moscow
15:00 MSK (UTC+3)	Willyan (yellow card) 2'; Musayev 49'; Oblyakov 60', 87' (pen.); Moisés 82'	Report		Stadium: VEB Arena; Attendance: 8,054; Referee: Artem Chistyakov

31 August 2024 7	Khimki	0–2	CSKA Moscow	Khimki
15:00 MSK (UTC+3)		Report	Musayev 38'; Moisés 63'	Stadium: Arena Khimki; Attendance: 4,405; Referee: Vasily Kazartsev

14 September 2024 8	CSKA Moscow	0–1	Zenit St.Petersburg	Moscow
16:30 MSK (UTC+3)	Gajić (yellow card) 33'; Moisés (yellow card) 80'; Oblyakov (yellow card) 83'; Khellven (yellow card) 90+3'	Report	Gondou 43'; Wendel (yellow card) 44'; Barrios (yellow card) 45+1'; Alip (yellow card) 80'; Nino (yellow card) 83'	Stadium: VEB Arena; Attendance: 22,851; Referee: Aleksey Sukhoi

21 September 2024 9	Rubin Kazan	1–1	CSKA Moscow	Kazan
19:00 MSK (UTC+3)	Gritsayenko (yellow card) 24'; Teslenko 55'	Report	Zhemaletdinov 15'; Diveyev (yellow card) 61'	Stadium: Ak Bars Arena; Attendance: 13,820; Referee: Kirill Levnikov

28 September 2024 10	CSKA Moscow	3–0	Akhmat Grozny	Moscow
14:00 MSK (UTC+3)	Fayzullaev 19'; Khellven 42'; Todorović 50' (o.g.); Kislyak (yellow card) 83'	Report	Camilo (yellow card) 11'	Stadium: VEB Arena; Attendance: 7,416; Referee: Pavel Kukuyan

6 October 2024 11	Dynamo Moscow	1–2	CSKA Moscow	Moscow
19:00 MSK (UTC+3)	Carrascal 55'; Ngamaleu (yellow card) 62'	Report	Fayzullaev 17'; Kislyak (yellow card) 73'; Musayev 89' (yellow card) 90'	Stadium: VTB Arena; Attendance: 18,655; Referee: Vladislav Bezborodov

19 October 2024 12	Dynamo Makhachkala	0–1	CSKA Moscow	Kaspiysk
19:00 MSK (UTC+3)	Cacintura (yellow card) 75'	Report	Musayev 56'; Willyan (yellow card) 90+'	Stadium: Anzhi Arena; Attendance: 10,215; Referee: Sergey Ivanov

26 October 2024 13	CSKA Moscow	0–0	Fakel Voronezh	Moscow
16:30 MSK (UTC+3)	Krugovoy (yellow card) 70'; Koïta (yellow card) 75'; Fayzullaev (yellow card) 78'; Zdjelar (yellow card) 90+'	Report	Alshin (yellow card) 23'; Brahim (yellow card) 31'; Yurganov (yellow card) 51'; Senhadji (yellow card) 66'	Stadium: VEB Arena; Attendance: 8,757; Referee: Kirill Levnikov

2 November 2024 14	CSKA Moscow	0–2	Spartak Moscow	Moscow
20:45 MSK (UTC+3)	Willyan (red card) 57'; Oblyakov (yellow card) 69' (yellow-red card) 85'; Pjanić (yellow card) 83'	Report	Bongonda 45'; Babić (yellow card) 57'; Umyarov (yellow card) 57'; Litvinov (red card) 57'; Prutsev (yellow card) 83'; Denisov (yellow card) 90'; Medina 90+'	Stadium: VEB Arena; Attendance: 23,045; Referee: Aleksey Sukhoi

10 November 2024 15	Krylia Sovetov	1–2	CSKA Moscow	Samara
13:00 MSK (UTC+3)	Oleynikov (yellow card) 35'; Méndez (yellow card) 45+'; Dmitriyev 60'; Galdames (yellow card) 90+'	Report	Koïta (yellow card) 18'; Diveyev 45+'; Krugovoy 84'	Stadium: Solidarnost Samara Arena; Attendance: 5,716; Referee: Ivan Abrosimov

23 November 2024 16	CSKA Moscow	1–2	Rostov	Moscow
14:15 MSK (UTC+3)	Khellven 4'; Krugovoy (yellow card) 48'; Zdjelar (yellow card) 90+'	Report	Kuchayev (yellow card) 70'; Golenkov 77', 90' (yellow card) 90+'	Stadium: VEB Arena; Attendance: 6,751; Referee: Pavel Kukuyan

30 November 2024 17	CSKA Moscow	2–2	Rubin Kazan	Moscow
16:30 MSK (UTC+3)	Lukin 63', 90+' (yellow card) 73'	Report	Jočić (yellow card) 22'; Iwu (yellow card) 35'; Kabutov (yellow card) 41' (yellow-red card) 65'; Daku 43'; Teslenko 52'; Bezrukov (yellow card) 88'	Stadium: VEB Arena; Attendance: 6,038; Referee: Vasily Kazartsev

8 December 2024 18	Fakel Voronezh	0–1	CSKA Moscow	Voronezh
16:30 MSK (UTC+3)	Kvekveskiri (yellow card) 38'; Moțpan (yellow card) 81'; Shchetinin (yellow card) 86'	Report	Musayev 12'; Pjanić (yellow card) 79'	Stadium: Fakel Stadium; Attendance: 8,661; Referee: Kirill Levnikov

2 March 2025 19	Zenit St.Petersburg	0–0	CSKA Moscow	Saint Petersburg
16:30 MSK (UTC+3)	Eraković (yellow card) 58'; Yerokhin (yellow card) 90+'	Report	Pjanić (yellow card) 47'; Willyan (yellow card) 67'; Kislyak (yellow card) 90+'	Stadium: Krestovsky Stadium; Attendance: 50,544; Referee: Sergey Ivanov

8 March 2025 20	CSKA Moscow	1–0	Khimki	Moscow
17:00 MSK (UTC+3)	Willyan 90+'	Report	Dzhikiya (yellow card) FT	Stadium: VEB Arena; Attendance: 7,669; Referee: Rafael Shafeev

16 March 2025 21	Akron Tolyatti	1–2	CSKA Moscow	Samara
13:00 MSK (UTC+3)	Khubulov 64'; Bokoyev (yellow card) 90'; Moskvichyov (yellow card) 90+'	Report	Glebov 36'; Guarirapa 59'; Kislyak (yellow card) 63'	Stadium: Solidarnost Samara Arena; Attendance: 3,896; Referee: Mikhail Cheremnykh

29 March 2025 22	CSKA Moscow	2–0	Dynamo Makhachkala	Moscow
19:30 MSK (UTC+3)	Moisés 32' (yellow card) 32'; Oblyakov (yellow card) 43'; Guarirapa (yellow card) 58'; Zhemaletdinov 80'	Report	Cacintura (yellow card) 69'; Gadzhiyev (yellow card) 81'	Stadium: VEB Arena; Attendance: 9,406; Referee: Aleksey Sukhoi

6 April 2025 23	CSKA Moscow	3–1	Dynamo Moscow	Moscow
19:30 MSK (UTC+3)	Skopintsev 16' (o.g.); Fayzullaev (yellow card) 35'; Kislyak (yellow card) 60'; Diveyev (yellow card) 74'; Guarirapa 78' (yellow card) 79' Oblyakov 90+' (pen.)	Report	Skopintsev (yellow card) 3'; Carrascal 24' (pen.); Fomin (yellow card) 70'; Chávez (yellow card) 75'	Stadium: VEB Arena; Attendance: 12,192; Referee: Sergei Karasev

12 April 2025 24	Orenburg	0–2	CSKA Moscow	Orenburg
12:00 MSK (UTC+3)	Tatayev (yellow card) 11'	Report	Lukin (yellow card) 53'; Oblyakov 55'; Gajić (yellow card) 63'; Koïta 90+1'	Stadium: Gazovik Stadium; Attendance: 5,876; Referee: Egor Egorov

20 April 2025 25	CSKA Moscow	1–1	Krylia Sovetov	Moscow
19:30 MSK (UTC+3)	Khellven (yellow card) 8'; Zhemaletdinov (yellow card) 57'; Koïta 69'; Shumansky (yellow card) 90+'	Report	Bijl (yellow card) 53'; Sergeyev 74' (pen.); Oroz (yellow card) 79'; Pesyakov (yellow card) 90+'	Stadium: VEB Arena; Attendance: 10,661; Referee: Pavel Kukuyan

26 April 2025 26	Spartak Moscow	1–2	CSKA Moscow	Moscow
19:30 MSK (UTC+3)	Martins (yellow card) 4'; Babić (yellow card) 41' (yellow-red card) 90+'; Duarte (yellow card) 61'; Barco 87' (pen.) (yellow card) 88'; Maksimenko (yellow card) 89'	Report	Fayzullaev (yellow card) 16'; Guarirapa 44'; Pjanić (yellow card) 51'; Gajić (yellow card) 60'; Glebov (yellow card) 88'; Bistrović 89'; Moisés (yellow card) 90+'	Stadium: Lukoil Arena; Attendance: 39,018; Referee: Kirill Levnikov

4 May 2025 27	Akhmat Grozny	1–1	CSKA Moscow	Grozny
16:30 MSK (UTC+3)	Ibishev (yellow card) 27'; Samorodov 33'	Report	Koïta 9'; Oblyakov (yellow card) 16'; Fayzullaev (yellow card) 57'; Guarirapa (yellow card) 81'; Khellven (yellow card) 90+'	Stadium: Akhmat-Arena; Attendance: 5,368; Referee: Artem Chistyakov

10 May 2025 28	CSKA Moscow	1–0	Krasnodar	Moscow
19:30 MSK (UTC+3)	Guarirapa 69'	Report	Kaio (yellow card) FT	Stadium: VEB Arena; Attendance: 21,393; Referee: Sergei Karasev

19 May 2025 29	Lokomotiv Moscow	2–2	CSKA Moscow	Moscow
20:30 MSK (UTC+3)	Vorobyov 10', 25'; Suleymanov (yellow card) 41'; Nenakhov (yellow card) 49'	Report	Guarirapa (yellow card) 41' (goal) 47'; Kislyak 80'; Fayzullaev (yellow card) 88'	Stadium: RZD Arena; Attendance: 15,815; Referee: Artem Chistyakov

24 May 2025 30	CSKA Moscow	2–0	Pari NN	Moscow
16:30 MSK (UTC+3)	Oblyakov 39' (pen.); Shumansky 90'	Report		Stadium: VEB Arena; Attendance: 12,228; Referee: Vasily Kazartsev

=== Russian Cup ===
==== Group stage ====
Pos	Team	Pld	W	PW	PL	L	GF	GA	GD	Pts	Qualification
1	CSKA Moscow	6	4	1	0	1	8	2	+6	14	Qualification to the Knockout phase (RPL path)
2	Akhmat Grozny	6	3	0	0	3	9	6	+3	9 (Note: Goal difference in head-to-head games: Akhmat +2, Krasnodar -2 (3-0, 0-1))	Qualification to the Knockout phase (RPL path)
3	Krasnodar	6	3	0	0	3	4	7	−3	9	Qualification to the Knockout phase (regions path)
4	Pari Nizhny Novgorod	6	1	0	1	4	5	11	−6	4	

Source: Russian Football Union (in Russian), Soccerway
Rules for classification: 1) Points; 2) Head-to-head points; 3) Head-to-head matches won; 4) Head-to-head goal difference; 5) Head-to-head goals scored; 6) Matches won; 7) Goal difference; 8) Goals scored; 9) Penalty shoot-out goal difference; 10) Draw.
Notes:

31 July 2024 1	Krasnodar	1–0	CSKA Moscow	Krasnodar
21:00 MSK (UTC+3)	Pina 52'; João Batxi (yellow card) 55'; Olaza (yellow card) 90+2'	Report	Moisés (yellow card) 17'; Bistrović (yellow card) 30'; Willyan (yellow card) 38'	Stadium: Krasnodar Stadium; Attendance: 23,155; Referee: Artem Lyubimov

14 August 2024 2	CSKA Moscow	1-1 (4–2 p)	Pari NN	Moscow
17:15 MSK (UTC+3)	Diveyev 60'; Moisés (yellow card) 90+3'	Report	Zé Turbo 32'; Kutateladze (yellow card) 44'; Aleksandrov (yellow card) 52'; Karapuzov (yellow card) 85'	Stadium: VEB Arena; Attendance: 9,062; Referee: Aleksandr Mashlyakevich
	Penalties
	Oblyakov (penalty scored); Diveyev (penalty scored); Krugovoy (penalty scored); Khellven (penalty scored)		(penalty scored) Ožegović; (penalty missed) Gotsuk; (penalty missed) Stamatov; (penalty scored) Aleksandrov

27 August 2024 3	Akhmat Grozny	0–2	CSKA Moscow	Grozny
17:15 MSK (UTC+3)	Shvets (yellow card) 15'; Šatara (yellow card) 53'; Camilo (yellow card) 90+6'	Report	Bistrović (yellow card) 35'; Willyan (yellow card) 72'; Musayev 87'; Krugovoy 90+7'	Stadium: Akhmat-Arena; Attendance: 6,517; Referee: Egor Egorov

18 September 2024 4	CSKA Moscow	2–0	Krasnodar	Moscow
19:00 MSK (UTC+3)	Gajić 32'; Torop (yellow card) 48'; Kislyak (yellow card) 58' (goal) 89'	Report	Tormena (yellow card) 24'; Pina (yellow card) 31'; González (yellow card) 90+3'	Stadium: VEB Arena; Attendance: 20,117; Referee: Sergey Cheban

1 October 2024 5	Pari NN	0–2	CSKA Moscow	Nizhny Novgorod
20:45 MSK (UTC+3)	Zé Turbo (yellow card) 27'	Report	Gajić (yellow card) 28'; Bistrović 49'; Glebov 62'	Stadium: Nizhny Novgorod Stadium; Attendance: 15,098; Referee: Sergey Tsyganok

22 October 2024 6	CSKA Moscow	1–0	Akhmat Grozny	Moscow
20:45 MSK (UTC+3)	Koïta 34' (yellow card) 49'; Bistrović (yellow card) 49'; Zdjelar (yellow card) 88'	Report	Shvets (yellow card) 24'	Stadium: VEB Arena; Attendance: 11,128; Referee: Vladimir Moskalyov

==== Knockout phase ====
6 November 2024 RPL path Quarterfinals 1st leg	Rubin Kazan	0–0	CSKA Moscow	Kazan
18:30 MSK (UTC+3)	Çuni (yellow card) 10' (penalty missed) 89'; Vujačić (yellow card) 35'; Teslenko (yellow card) 53'	Report	Zdjelar (yellow card) 17'; Diveyev (yellow card) 33'; Krugovoy (yellow card) 42'; Khellven (yellow card) 90+1'	Stadium: Ak Bars Arena; Attendance: 14,070; Referee: Artem Chistyakov

26 November 2024 RPL path Quarterfinals 2nd leg	CSKA Moscow	3–0 (3–0 agg.)	Rubin Kazan	Moscow
20:30 MSK (UTC+3)	Khellven 20' (yellow card) 88'; Fayzullaev 30'; Musayev 38'; Willyan (yellow card) 88'	Report	Shabanhaxhaj (yellow card) 59'	Stadium: VEB Arena; Attendance: 11,325; Referee: Sergey Ivanov

12 March 2025 RPL path Semifinals 1st leg	CSKA Moscow	2–1	Dynamo Moscow	Moscow
20:30 MSK (UTC+3)	Koïta 50'; Kislyak 63'; Glebov (yellow card) 90'; Guarirapa (yellow card) 90+5'	Report	Skopintsev 58'; Maouhoub (red card) 61'; Carrascal (yellow card) 90'; Fernández (yellow card) 90+1'	Stadium: VEB Arena; Attendance: 24,873; Referee: Kirill Levnikov

16 April 2025 RPL path Semifinals 2nd leg	Dynamo Moscow	0–0 (1–2 agg.)	CSKA Moscow	Moscow
20:30 MSK (UTC+3)	Fomin (yellow card) 58'; Gladyshev (yellow card) 83'	Report	Koïta (yellow card) 61'; Willyan (yellow card) 90+2'; Moisés (yellow card) 90+5'	Stadium: VTB Arena; Attendance: 25,074; Referee: Artem Chistyakov

30 April 2025 RPL path Final 1st leg	Zenit St.Petersburg	2–0	CSKA Moscow	Saint Petersburg
20:30 MSK (UTC+3)	Cassiera 17'; Gorshkov (yellow card) 54'; Mostovoy 57' (pen.); Adamov (yellow card) 63'; Zdjelar (yellow card) 72'; Gondou (yellow card) 90+5'	Report	Gajić (yellow card) 8'; Torop (yellow card) 55'; Glebov (yellow card) 63'	Stadium: Krestovsky Stadium; Attendance: 51,580; Referee: Sergey Ivanov

14 May 2025 RPL path Final 2nd leg	CSKA Moscow	2–0 (2–2 agg.) (4–3 p)	Zenit St.Petersburg	Moscow
19:30 MSK (UTC+3)	Kislyak 37' (yellow card) 73'; Oblyakov (penalty missed) 45+2'; Willyan (yellow card) 45+5'; Musayev 90+2'	Report		Stadium: VEB Arena; Attendance: 30,433; Referee: Vitali Meshkov
	Penalties
	Diveyev (penalty scored); Alerrandro (penalty scored); Kislyak (penalty scored); Krugovoy (penalty scored)		(penalty missed) Sobolev; (penalty scored) Douglas; (penalty scored) Mostovoy; (penalty scored) Henrique; (penalty missed) Mantuan

1 June 2025 Final	Rostov	0–0 (3–4 p)	CSKA Moscow	Moscow
18:00 MSK (UTC+3)	Melyokhin (yellow card) 45+5'; Sako (yellow card) 58'; Shchetinin (yellow card) 82'	Report		Stadium: Luzhniki Stadium; Attendance: 57,176; Referee: Kirill Levnikov
	Penalties
	Bayramyan (penalty missed); Komlichenko (penalty scored); Sutormin (penalty missed); Sako (penalty scored); Osipenko (penalty scored)		(penalty scored) Pjanić; (penalty missed) Diveyev; (penalty scored) Oblyakov; (penalty scored) Kislyak; (penalty scored) Gajić

== Squad statistics ==
As of match played 1 June 2025

=== Appearances and goals ===
No.	Pos	Nat	Player	Total		Premier League		Russian Cup	
No.	Pos	Nat	Player	Apps	Goals	Apps	Goals	Apps	Goals
3	DF	(Russia) RUS	Danil Krugovoy	31	2	22+2	1	1+6	1
4	DF	(Brazil) BRA	Willyan Rocha	35	1	26	1	9	0
6	MF	(Russia) RUS	Maksim Mukhin	1	0	0	0	0+1	0
7	FW	(Brazil) BRA	Alerrandro	7	0	2+4	0	0+1	0
8	FW	(Belarus) BLR	Artyom Shumansky	9	1	1+4	1	0+4	0
9	FW	(Venezuela) VEN	Saúl Guarirapa	30	5	8+12	5	6+4	0
10	MF	(Russia) RUS	Ivan Oblyakov	41	7	29	7	8+4	0
11	FW	(Russia) RUS	Tamerlan Musayev	43	10	22+8	7	4+9	3
13	DF	(Brazil) BRA	Khellven	31	4	18+6	3	5+2	1
15	MF	(Bosnia and Herzegovina) BIH	Miralem Pjanić	25	0	10+6	0	7+2	0
17	MF	(Russia) RUS	Kirill Glebov	23	2	4+11	1	4+4	1
19	MF	(Russia) RUS	Rifat Zhemaletdinov	29	2	12+12	2	1+4	0
20	FW	(Mali) MLI	Sékou Koïta	35	5	9+13	3	11+2	2
21	MF	(Uzbekistan) UZB	Abbosbek Fayzullaev	39	3	20+7	2	6+6	1
22	DF	(Serbia) SRB	Milan Gajić	31	1	13+8	0	10	1
25	MF	(Croatia) CRO	Kristijan Bistrović	31	2	11+9	1	7+4	1
27	DF	(Brazil) BRA	Moisés	37	3	25	3	12	0
31	MF	(Russia) RUS	Matvey Kislyak	33	4	19+3	1	10+1	3
35	GK	(Russia) RUS	Igor Akinfeev	30	0	28	0	2	0
49	GK	(Russia) RUS	Vladislav Torop	13	0	2	0	11	0
51	DF	(Russia) RUS	Dzhamalutdin Abdulkadyrov	4	0	2+1	0	1	0
52	DF	(Armenia) ARM	Artyom Bandikyan	3	0	0+3	0	0	0
78	DF	(Russia) RUS	Igor Diveyev	36	6	26	5	10	1
90	DF	(Russia) RUS	Matvey Lukin	17	2	6+3	2	7+1	0
Players away from the club on loan:
38	FW	(Argentina) ARG	Adolfo Gaich	2	0	0+1	0	0+1	0
46	FW	(Russia) RUS	Vladislav Yakovlev	2	0	0+1	0	0+1	0
77	DF	(Russia) RUS	Ilya Agapov	5	0	0	0	5	0
Players who appeared for CSKA Moscow but left during the season:
5	MF	(Serbia) SRB	Saša Zdjelar	21	0	11+4	0	4+2	0
7	FW	(Chile) CHI	Víctor Dávila	6	0	3+1	0	2	0
9	FW	(Russia) RUS	Fyodor Chalov	2	0	1+1	0	0	0

=== Goal scorers ===
Place	Position	Nation	Number	Name	Premier League	Russian Cup	Total
1	FW	(Russia)	11	Tamerlan Musayev	7	3	10
2	MF	(Russia)	10	Ivan Oblyakov	7	0	7
3	DF	(Russia)	78	Igor Diveyev	5	1	6
4	FW	(Venezuela)	9	Saúl Guarirapa	5	0	5
4	FW	(Mali)	20	Sékou Koïta	3	2	5
6	DF	(Brazil)	13	Khellven	3	1	4
6	MF	(Russia)	31	Matvey Kislyak	1	3	4
8	DF	(Brazil)	27	Moisés	3	0	3
8	MF	(Uzbekistan)	21	Abbosbek Fayzullaev	2	1	3
10	MF	(Russia)	90	Matvey Lukin	2	0	2
10	MF	(Russia)	19	Rifat Zhemaletdinov	2	0	2
10	DF	(Russia)	3	Danil Krugovoy	1	1	2
10	MF	(Russia)	17	Kirill Glebov	1	1	2
10	MF	(Russia)	25	Kristijan Bistrović	1	1	2
10				Own goal	2	0	2
15	DF	(Brazil)	4	Willyan Rocha	1	0	1
15	FW	(Belarus)	8	Artyom Shumansky	1	0	1
15	DF	(Serbia)	22	Milan Gajić	0	1	1
Total					44	15	59

=== Clean sheets ===
Place	Position	Nation	Number	Name	Premier League	Russian Cup	Total
1	GK	(Russia)	35	Igor Akinfeev	12	2	14
2	GK	(Russia)	49	Vladislav Torop	2	7	9
Total					14	9	23

=== Disciplinary record ===
Number	Nation	Position	Name	Premier League		Russian Cup		Total	
Number	Nation	Position	Name	Yellow card	Red card	Yellow card	Red card	Yellow card	Red card
3	(Russia)	DF	Danil Krugovoy	3	0	1	0	4	0
4	(Brazil)	DF	Willyan Rocha	3	1	5	0	8	1
8	(Belarus)	FW	Artyom Shumansky	1	0	0	0	1	0
9	(Venezuela)	FW	Saúl Guarirapa	4	0	1	0	5	0
10	(Russia)	MF	Ivan Oblyakov	5	1	0	0	5	1
11	(Russia)	FW	Tamerlan Musayev	2	0	0	0	2	0
13	(Brazil)	DF	Khellven	3	0	2	0	5	0
15	(Bosnia and Herzegovina)	MF	Miralem Pjanić	4	0	0	0	4	0
17	(Russia)	MF	Kirill Glebov	1	0	2	0	3	0
19	(Russia)	MF	Rifat Zhemaletdinov	1	0	0	0	1	0
20	(Mali)	FW	Sékou Koïta	3	0	2	0	5	0
21	(Uzbekistan)	MF	Abbosbek Fayzullaev	5	0	0	0	5	0
22	(Serbia)	DF	Milan Gajić	4	0	2	0	6	0
25	(Croatia)	MF	Kristijan Bistrović	0	0	3	0	3	0
27	(Brazil)	DF	Moisés	4	0	3	0	7	0
31	(Russia)	MF	Matvey Kislyak	5	0	2	0	7	0
49	(Russia)	GK	Vladislav Torop	0	0	2	0	2	0
78	(Russia)	DF	Igor Diveyev	2	0	1	0	3	0
90	(Russia)	DF	Matvey Lukin	2	0	0	0	2	0
Players away on loan:
Players who left CSKA Moscow during the season:
5	(Serbia)	MF	Saša Zdjelar	3	0	2	0	5	0
Total				55	2	28	0	83	2
