= Khellven =

Brazilian footballer

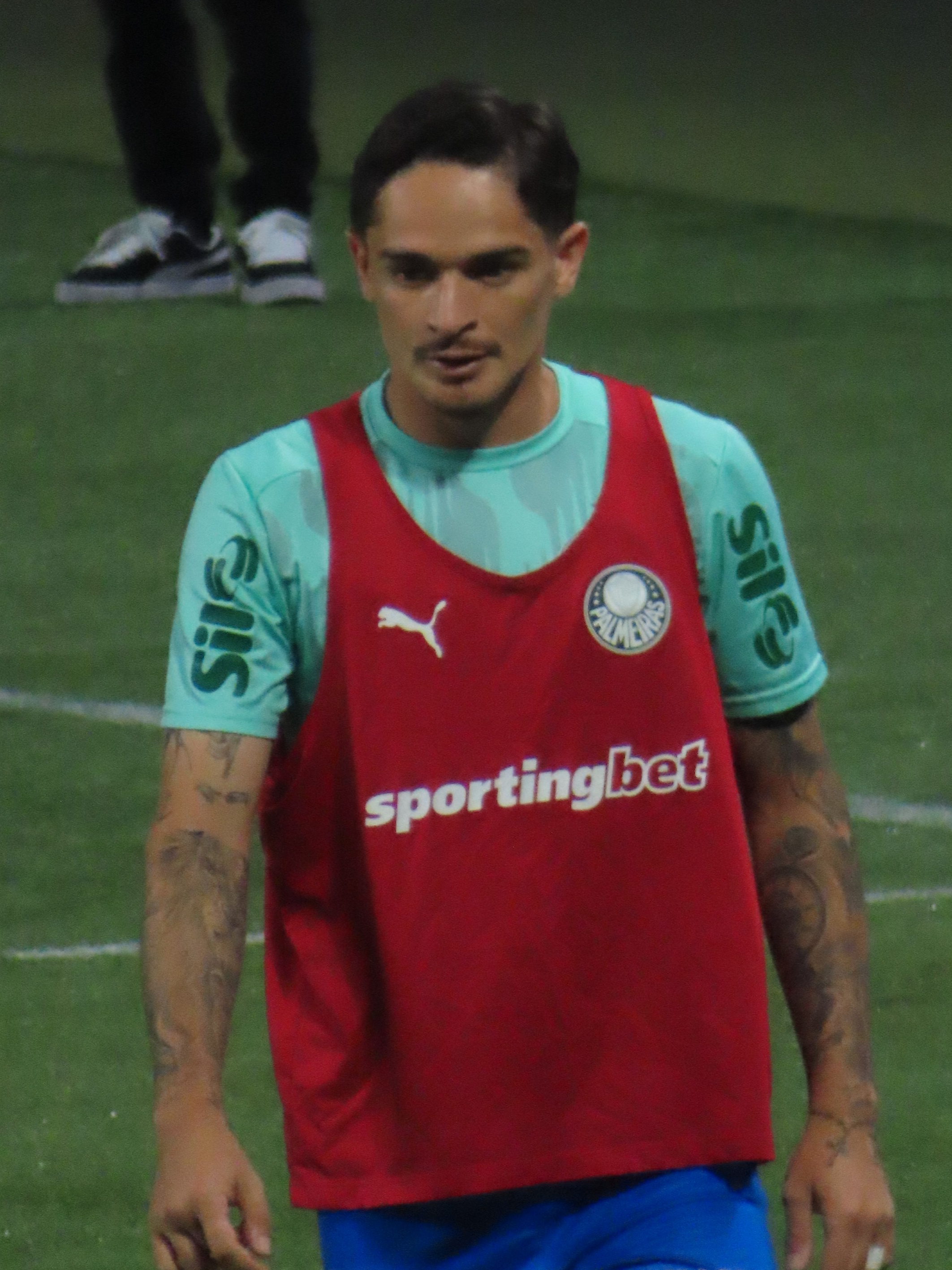
- Khellven with Palmeiras in 2025

Personal information
- Full name: Khellven Douglas Silva Oliveira
- Date of birth: 25 February 2001 (age 25)
- Place of birth: Alexandria, Brazil
- Height: 1.76 m (5 ft 9 in)
- Position: Right-back

Team information
- Current team: Palmeiras
- Number: 12

Youth career
- –2019: Guarani de Palhoça
- 2018–2019: → Athletico Paranaense (loan)
- 2019: Athletico Paranaense

Senior career*
Years	Team	Apps	(Gls)
2018–2019	Guarani de Palhoça	0	(0)
2019–2023	Athletico Paranaense	89	(3)
2023–2025	CSKA Moscow	47	(4)
2025–	Palmeiras	29	(1)

International career^{‡}
2024	Brazil U23	7	(0)
- * Club domestic league appearances and goals as of 7 April 2026 ‡ National team caps and goals as of 11 February 2024

Khellven Douglas Silva Oliveira (born 25 February 2001), simply known as Khellven, is a Brazilian footballer who plays as a right-back for Palmeiras.

== Club career ==
On 1 September 2023, Khellven signed a five-year contract with CSKA Moscow in the Russian Premier League.

On 4 August 2025, Khellven returned to Brazil and signed a five-year contract with Palmeiras.

== International career ==
Khellven represented Brazil U23 at the 2024 CONMEBOL Pre-Olympic Tournament, where Brazil failed to qualify for the Olympics.

== Career statistics ==
=== Club ===
As of match played 12 July 2025

Appearances and goals by club, season and competition
Club	Season	League			State League		Cup		Continental		Other		Total	
Club	Season	Division	Apps	Goals	Apps	Goals	Apps	Goals	Apps	Goals	Apps	Goals	Apps	Goals
Guarani de Palhoça	2018	Catarinense Divisão Especial	—		3	0	—		—		0	0	3	0
Athletico Paranaense	2019	Série A	5	0	9	1	3	0	0	0	—		17	1
Athletico Paranaense	2020	Série A	21	0	5	1	1	0	1 (Note: Appearance(s) in Copa Libertadores)	0	1 (Note: Appearance(s) in Supercopa do Brasil)	0	29	1
Athletico Paranaense	2021	Série A	20	2	9	0	6	0	7 (Note: Appearance(s) in Copa Sudamericana)	0	—		42	2
Athletico Paranaense	2022	Série A	28	1	0	0	6	1	10	0	1 (Note: Appearance(s) in Recopa Sudamericana)	0	45	2
Athletico Paranaense	2023	Série A	11	0	16	2	5	0	4	0	—		36	2
Athletico Paranaense	Total		85	3	39	4	21	1	22	0	2	0	169	8
CSKA Moscow	2023–24	Russian Premier League	23	1	—		8	0	—		—		31	1
CSKA Moscow	2024–25	Russian Premier League	24	3	—		7	1	—		—		31	4
CSKA Moscow	2025–26	Russian Premier League	0	0	—		0	0	—		1 (Note: Appearance(s) in Russian Super Cup)	0	1	0
CSKA Moscow	Total		47	4	—		15	1	—		1	0	63	5
Career total			132	7	42	4	36	2	22	0	3	0	235	13

== Honours ==
Athletico Paranaense

- Campeonato Paranaense: 2019, 2020, 2023
- J.League Cup / Copa Sudamericana Championship: 2019
- Copa do Brasil: 2019
- Copa Sudamericana: 2021

CSKA Moscow

- Russian Cup: 2024–25
- Russian Super Cup: 2025

Palmeiras

- Campeonato Paulista: 2026
