= 2024 LPBank Cup =

International football tournament

Tournament details
- Host country: Vietnam
- City: Hanoi
- Dates: 5–10 September 2024
- Teams: 3 (from 2 confederations)

Tournament statistics
- Matches played: 2
- Goals scored: 6 (3 per match)
- Top scorer(s): (Russia) Daler Kuzyayev (Russia) Tamerlan Musayev (Thailand) Suphanat Mueanta (Thailand) Patrik Gustavsson (Vietnam) Nguyễn Tiến Linh (1 goal each)
- All statistics correct as of 10 September 2024.

The 2024 LPBank Cup was the twelfth edition of the VFF Cup, an international men's friendly football tournament organized by the Vietnam Football Federation and sponsored by LPBank. The tournament, which featured three participants, was scheduled to be played from 5 to 10 September 2024 at the Mỹ Đình National Stadium in Hanoi.

Due to the impacts of Typhoon Yagi, the match scheduled on 7 September between Russia and Thailand was cancelled. Consequently, there would be no winners team as the tournament was left unfinished.

== Participating nations ==
Vietnam Football Federation confirmed the participating teams on 19 August 2024. The tournament will feature host Vietnam and their regional rival Thailand, whom both failed to advance to the third round of the 2026 World Cup qualification. The third participant team was Russia, who was suspended from FIFA and UEFA competitions following the invasion of Ukraine.

FIFA Rankings, as of 18 July 2024

Nation	Confederation	FIFA ranking
Russia	UEFA	33
Thailand	AFC	101
Vietnam (host)	AFC	115

== Matches ==
All times are in Vietnam Standard Time – UTC+7

5 September 2024
20:00

Vietnam	0–3	Russia
	Report	Kuzyayev 24'; Vũ Văn Thanh 62' (o.g.); Musayev 77'

Mỹ Đình National Stadium, Hanoi
Attendance: 5,000
Referee: Yusri Mohamad (Malaysia)
7 September 2024
20:00

Russia	Cancelled (Note: The match was cancelled for safety reasons due to Typhoon Yagi.)	Thailand
	Report

Mỹ Đình National Stadium, Hanoi
10 September 2024
20:00

Vietnam	1–2	Thailand
Nguyễn Tiến Linh 21'	Report	Suphanat 26'; Gustavsson 40'

Mỹ Đình National Stadium, Hanoi
Referee: Suhaizi Shukri (Malaysia)

== Statistics ==
=== Goalscorers ===
There were 6 goals scored in 2 matches, for an average of 3 goals per match.

1 goal

- (Russia) Daler Kuzyayev
- (Russia) Tamerlan Musayev
- (Thailand) Suphanat Mueanta
- (Thailand) Patrik Gustavsson
- (Vietnam) Nguyễn Tiến Linh

1 own goal

- (Vietnam) Vũ Văn Thanh (against Russia)
