= Sékou Koïta =

Malian footballer

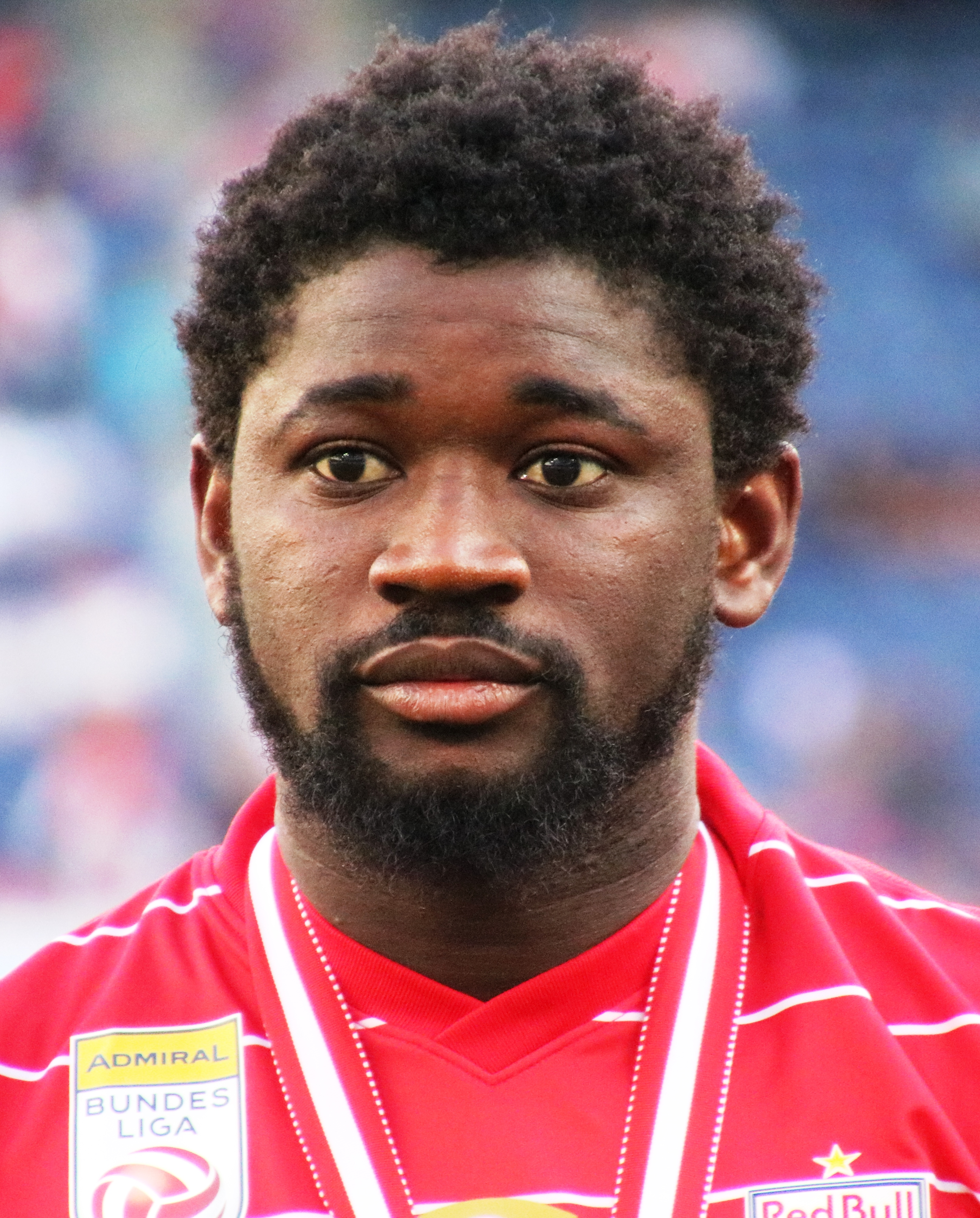
- Koïta with Red Bull Salzburg in 2022

Personal information
- Full name: Sékou Koïta
- Date of birth: 28 November 1999 (age 26)
- Place of birth: Kita, Mali
- Height: 1.73 m (5 ft 8 in)
- Position: Forward

Team information
- Current team: Gençlerbirliği
- Number: 22

Youth career
- USC Kita

Senior career*
Years	Team	Apps	(Gls)
2018–2019	FC Liefering	15	(2)
2019	→ Wolfsberger AC (loan)	14	(5)
2019–2024	Red Bull Salzburg	76	(36)
2024–2026	CSKA Moscow	26	(3)
2025–2026	→ Gençlerbirliği (loan)	27	(6)
2026–	Gençlerbirliği	6	(1)

International career^{‡}
2015	Mali U17	10	(3)
2017–2019	Mali U20	10	(3)
2016–	Mali	37	(4)
- * Club domestic league appearances and goals as of 20 September 2026 ‡ National team caps and goals as of 4 October 2026 (UTC)

Sékou Koïta (born 28 November 1999) is a Malian professional footballer who plays as a forward for Turkish Süper Lig club Gençlerbirliği and the Mali national team.

== Club career ==
On 8 January 2018, Koïta moved to Wolfsberger AC on loan from Red Bull Salzburg. On 18 December 2019, Koïta extended his contract with Red Bull Salzburg until the summer of 2024.

On 18 February 2021, Koïta was suspended for three months of all club and international football activities by UEFA, following a doping investigation conducted by UEFA on which Koïta tested positive. Koita was prescribed medicine to combat altitude sickness that contained a substance on the banned list. In its verdict, UEFA ruled that in this case there was no intentional violation of doping rules, but the rules stipulate that every player is personally responsible for ensuring that no banned substances enter their body.

On 8 July 2024, Koïta signed a three-year contract with CSKA Moscow in the Russian Premier League.

On 20 August 2025, Koïta was loaned to Gençlerbirliği in Turkey, with an obligation to buy at the end of 2025–26 season.

== International career ==
Sékou Koïta won the U-17 Africa Cup of Nations in 2015 with the Mali Under-17 team. He scored two goals in this tournament. The Malian selection scores a total of ten goals, and finishes the competition by being undefeated. This is the very first time Mali has won an African championship title.

Sékou Koïta subsequently participates in the 2015 FIFA U-17 World Cup held in Chile. In the world, he plays seven games, scoring two goals. He scored a goal in the quarterfinals against Croatia, which proved to be the only goal of the match. He then scored a goal against Belgium in the semi-final (victory 3-1). Mali is bowing in the final against Nigeria with two goals to zero.

In 2016, Sékou Koïta competes with Mali for the African Nations Championship held in Rwanda. His presence in this competition was due to the N'Tji Samaké package, in which doctors diagnosed a heart condition the day before the competition. He plays six games in this tournament, scoring a goal against Uganda in the first round. Mali reached the final of the competition, being defeated by the Democratic Republic of the Congo.

With those under 20 years of age, he participated twice in the U-20 Africa Cup of Nations, in 2017 and then in 2019. In the 2017 edition in Zambia, he plays three games, scoring a goal against Guinea. With an unfortunate record of one draw, two losses and nine goals cashed, Mali does not exceed the first round of the tournament. In the 2019 edition held in Niger, he plays five games. Mali won the competition this time, beating Senegal in the final, after a shoot-out at the goal.

He is then among the 23 players selected to compete in the 2019 Africa Cup of Nations held in Egypt. In this tournament, he plays only one match against Angola. Mali is entering the eighth final against Ivory Coast.

On 13 October 2019, he scored his second goal for the national team in a friendly match against South Africa, which ended in a 2–1 defeat. He later registered his third goal on 17 November 2020 in a 2–1 victory over Namibia during the 2021 Africa Cup of Nations qualification.

On 2 January 2024, he was named in the list of twenty-seven Malian players selected by Éric Chelle for the 2023 Africa Cup of Nations, where the latter drew attention on social media after asking for "3 kuss".

== Career statistics ==
=== Club ===
As of match played 20 September 2026

Appearances and goals by club, season and competition
Club	Season	League			National cup (Note: Includes Austrian Cup, Russian Cup)		Europe		Other		Total	
Club	Season	Division	Apps	Goals	Apps	Goals	Apps	Goals	Apps	Goals	Apps	Goals
FC Liefering	2017–18	2. Liga	6	1	—		—		—		6	1
FC Liefering	2018–19	2. Liga	9	1	—		—		—		9	1
FC Liefering	Total		15	2	—		—		0	0	15	2
Wolfsberger AC (loan)	2018–19	Austrian Bundesliga	14	5	0	0	—		—		14	5
Red Bull Salzburg	2019–20	Austrian Bundesliga	16	8	4	3	3 (Note: One appearance in UEFA Champions League, two appearances in UEFA Europa League)	0	—		23	11
Red Bull Salzburg	2020–21	Austrian Bundesliga	17	14	4	3	8 (Note: Appearance(s) in UEFA Champions League)	0	—		29	17
Red Bull Salzburg	2021–22	Austrian Bundesliga	2	1	0	0	0	0	—		2	1
Red Bull Salzburg	2022–23	Austrian Bundesliga	22	6	1	0	2	0	—		25	6
Red Bull Salzburg	2023–24	Austrian Bundesliga	19	7	3	0	2	0	—		24	7
Red Bull Salzburg	Total		76	36	12	6	15	0	0	0	103	42
CSKA Moscow	2024–25	Russian Premier League	22	3	13	2	—		—		35	5
CSKA Moscow	2025–26	Russian Premier League	4	0	2	0	—		1 (Note: Appearance in Russian Super Cup)	0	7	0
CSKA Moscow	Total		26	3	15	2	0	0	1	0	42	5
Gençlerbirliği (loan)	2025–26	Süper Lig	27	6	5	0	—		—		32	6
Gençlerbirliği	2026–27	Süper Lig	6	1	0	0	—		—		6	1
Career total			164	53	32	8	15	0	1	0	212	61

=== International ===
As of match played 4 October 2026

Appearances and goals by national team and year
National team	Year	Apps	Goals
Mali	2016	6	1
Mali	2019	6	1
Mali	2020	2	0
Mali	2021	5	1
Mali	2022	1	1
Mali	2023	3	0
Mali	2024	10	0
Mali	2025	1	0
Mali	2026	3	0
Total		37	4

As of match played 9 June 2022
Mali score listed first, score column indicates score after each Koïta goal.

List of international goals scored by Sékou Koïta
No.	Date	Venue	Opponent	Score	Result	Competition
1.	19 January 2016	Umuganda Stadium, Gisenyi, Rwanda	Uganda	1–1	2–2	2016 African Nations Championship
2.	10 October 2019	Nelson Mandela Bay Stadium, Port Elizabeth, South Africa	South Africa	1–2	1–2	Friendly
3.	17 November 2020	Sam Nujoma Stadium, Windhoek, Namibia	Namibia	1–0	2–1	2021 Africa Cup of Nations qualification
4.	9 June 2022	St. Mary's Stadium-Kitende, Entebbe, Uganda	South Sudan	2–0	3–1	2023 Africa Cup of Nations qualification

== Honours ==
Red Bull Salzburg

- Austrian Bundesliga: 2019–20, 2020–21, 2021–22, 2022–23
- Austrian Cup: 2019–20, 2020–21, 2021–22

CSKA Moscow

- Russian Cup: 2024–25
- Russian Super Cup: 2025

Mali U17

- FIFA U-17 World Cup runner-up: 2015

Mali U20

- Africa U-20 Cup of Nations: 2019

Mali

- African Nations Championship runner-up: 2016
