= Dzhamalutdin Abdulkadyrov =

Russian footballer (born 2005)

Personal information
- Full name: Dzhamalutdin Anvarovich Abdulkadyrov
- Date of birth: 23 March 2005 (age 21)
- Place of birth: Makhachkala, Russia
- Height: 1.95 m (6 ft 5 in)
- Position: Defender

Team information
- Current team: CSKA Moscow
- Number: 23

Youth career
- 2011–2014: RDYuSSh Makhachkala
- 2014–2019: Anzhi Makhachkala
- 2019–2024: CSKA Moscow

Senior career*
Years	Team	Apps	(Gls)
2025–	CSKA Moscow	18	(0)
2026	→ Akhmat Grozny (loan)	3	(0)

International career^{‡}
2025–	Russia U21	3	(0)
2025–	Russia	1	(0)
- * Club domestic league appearances and goals as of 21 November 2026 ‡ National team caps and goals as of 5 September 2025

Dzhamalutdin Anvarovich Abdulkadyrov (Russian: Джамалутдин Анварович Абдулкадыров; born 23 March 2005) is a Russian footballer who plays as a defender for CSKA Moscow and the Russia national team.

== Club career ==
He made his Russian Premier League debut for CSKA Moscow on 26 April 2025 in a game against Spartak Moscow.

On 19 February 2026, Abdulkadyrov moved on loan to Akhmat Grozny, with an option to buy. He returned to CSKA at the end of the loan.

On 3 September 2026, his contract with CSKA was extended to June 2028, with an option for the 2028–29 season.

== International career ==
Abdulkadyrov was called up to the Russia national team for the first time in June 2025 for friendlies against Nigeria and Belarus. He made his debut against Belarus on 10 June 2025. He only played four games on the senior level for his club at that point (three in the league and one in the cup), becoming the second-least experienced debutant in the Russian national team history (behind Nikita Chernov who made his national team debut under Fabio Capello management after two cup club appearances and before his league debut).

== Career statistics ==
As of 21 November 2026

Club	Season	League			Cup		Other		Total	
Club	Season	Division	Apps	Goals	Apps	Goals	Apps	Goals	Apps	Goals
CSKA Moscow	2024–25	Russian Premier League	3	0	1	0	–		4	0
CSKA Moscow	2025–26	Russian Premier League	6	0	7	0	0	0	13	0
CSKA Moscow	2026–27	Russian Premier League	9	0	5	0	–		14	0
CSKA Moscow	Total		18	0	13	0	0	0	31	0
Akhmat Grozny (loan)	2025–26	Russian Premier League	3	0	–		–		3	0
Career total			21	0	13	0	0	0	34	0

=== International ===
As of match played 10 June 2025

Appearances and goals by national team and year
National team	Year	Apps	Goals
Russia	2025	1	0
Total		1	0

== Honours ==
CSKA Moscow

- Russian Cup: 2024–25
