= Matvey Kislyak =

Russian footballer (born 2005)

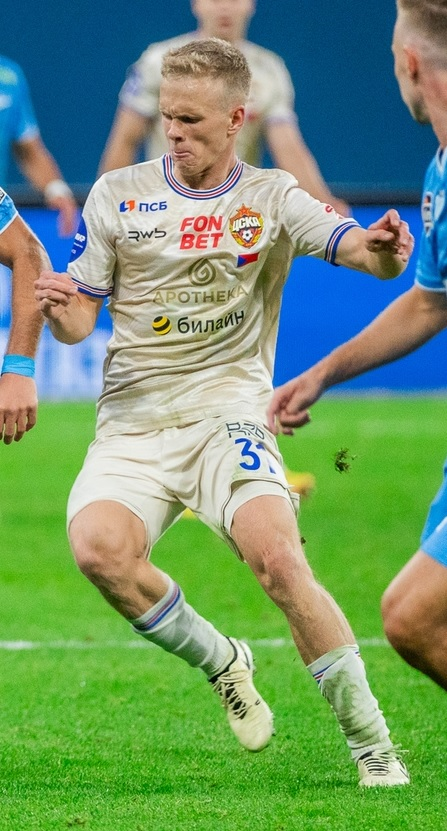
- Kislyak with CSKA in 2025

Personal information
- Full name: Matvey Alekseyevich Kislyak
- Date of birth: 26 July 2005 (age 21)
- Place of birth: Stary Oskol, Russia
- Height: 1.80 m (5 ft 11 in)
- Position: Attacking midfielder

Team information
- Current team: CSKA Moscow
- Number: 31

Youth career
- –2020: Chertanovo Education Center
- 2020–2023: CSKA Moscow

Senior career*
Years	Team	Apps	(Gls)
2023–	CSKA Moscow	69	(8)

International career^{‡}
2022	Russia U-18	2	(1)
2023	Russia U-19	1	(0)
2023–2024	Russia U-21	6	(1)
2025–	Russia	15	(2)
- * Club domestic league appearances and goals as of 21 November 2026 ‡ National team caps and goals as of 17 November 2026

Matvey Alekseyevich Kislyak (Russian: Матвей Алексеевич Кисляк; born 26 July 2005) is a Russian football player who plays as an attacking midfielder for CSKA Moscow and the Russia national team.

== Club career ==
Kislyak made his debut for CSKA Moscow on 26 July 2023 in a Russian Cup game against Orenburg. He made his Russian Premier League debut for CSKA on 24 September 2023 against Rostov.

== International career ==
In March 2025, Kislyak was called up to the Russia national team for the first time for friendlies against Grenada and Zambia. He made his debut against Grenada on 19 March 2025.

== Career statistics ==
As of match played 21 November 2026

Appearances and goals by club, season and competition
Club	Season	League			Cup		Other		Total	
Club	Season	Division	Apps	Goals	Apps	Goals	Apps	Goals	Apps	Goals
CSKA Moscow	2023–24	Russian Premier League	3	0	6	1	0	0	9	1
CSKA Moscow	2024–25	Russian Premier League	22	1	11	2	—		33	3
CSKA Moscow	2025–26	Russian Premier League	29	6	12	2	1 (Note: Appearance in Russian Super Cup)	0	42	8
CSKA Moscow	2026–27	Russian Premier League	15	1	4	0	—		19	1
Career total			69	8	33	5	1	0	103	13

=== International ===
As of match played 17 November 2026

Appearances and goals by national team and year
National team	Year	Apps	Goals
Russia	2025	7	1
Russia	2026	8	1
Total		15	2

International goals

Scores and results list Russia's goal tally first.

No.	Date	Venue	Opponent	Score	Result	Competition
1.	7 September 2025	Jassim bin Hamad Stadium, Al Rayyan, Qatar	Qatar	2–0	4–1	Friendly
2.	6 October 2026	Nizhny Novgorod Stadium, Nizhny Novgorod, Russia	Nigeria	2–1	3–3	Friendly

== Honours ==
CSKA Moscow

- Russian Cup: 2024–25
- Russian Super Cup: 2025
