= Matvey Lukin =

Russian footballer (born 2004)

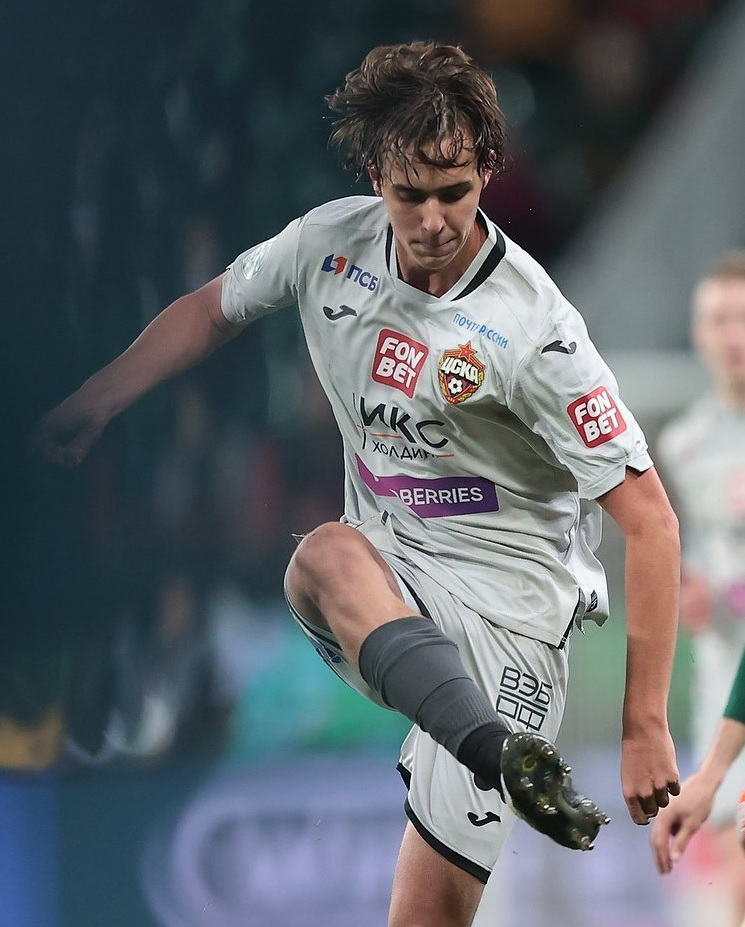
- Lukin with CSKA Moscow in 2022

Personal information
- Full name: Matvey Vladislavovich Lukin
- Date of birth: 27 April 2004 (age 22)
- Place of birth: Sergiyev Posad, Russia
- Height: 1.91 m (6 ft 3 in)
- Position: Centre-back

Team information
- Current team: CSKA Moscow
- Number: 90

Youth career
- 2009–2023: CSKA Moscow

Senior career*
Years	Team	Apps	(Gls)
2022–	CSKA Moscow	39	(3)

International career^{‡}
2020	Russia U16	2	(0)
2021	Russia U17	1	(0)
2023	Russia U19	1	(0)
2023–2024	Russia U21	5	(0)
2025–	Russia	4	(0)
- * Club domestic league appearances and goals as of 7 November 2026 ‡ National team caps and goals as of 15 November 2025

Matvey Vladislavovich Lukin (Russian: Матвей Владиславович Лукин; born 27 April 2004) is a Russian footballer who plays as a centre-back for CSKA Moscow and the Russia national team.

== Club career ==
Lukin made his debut for CSKA Moscow on 31 August 2022 in a Russian Cup game against Torpedo Moscow. He made his Russian Premier League debut for CSKA on 29 October 2022 against Lokomotiv Moscow, he played the full game and was chosen player of the match.

On 24 July 2023, Lukin extended his contract with CSKA to June 2025, with an option to extend for one more year.

On 14 March 2025, his contract with CSKA was extended to June 2027, with an option to extend for two more seasons. The performance-based option was triggered in May 2026, extending the contract to June 2029.

== International career ==
Lukin was first called up to the senior Russia national football team for friendlies against Jordan and Qatar in September 2025. He made his debut against Qatar on 7 September 2025.

== Career statistics ==
As of match played 7 November 2026

Appearances and goals by club, season and competition
Club	Season	League			Cup		Other		Total	
Club	Season	Division	Apps	Goals	Apps	Goals	Apps	Goals	Apps	Goals
CSKA Moscow	2022–23	Russian Premier League	2	0	1	0	—		3	0
CSKA Moscow	2023–24	Russian Premier League	5	0	6	0	0	0	11	0
CSKA Moscow	2024–25	Russian Premier League	9	2	8	0	0	0	17	2
CSKA Moscow	2025–26	Russian Premier League	18	1	9	0	—		27	1
CSKA Moscow	2026–27	Russian Premier League	5	0	4	0	—		9	0
CSKA Moscow	Total		39	3	28	0	0	0	67	3
Career total			39	3	28	0	0	0	67	3

=== International ===
As of match played 15 November 2025

Appearances and goals by national team and year
National team	Year	Apps	Goals
Russia	2025	4	0
Total		4	0

== Honours ==
=== Club ===
CSKA Moscow

- Russian Cup: 2022–23, 2024–25
