= Olimpbet =

Russian sports betting company

- Formerly: Bookmaker company Olimp
- Company type: Private company
- Industry: Sports betting
- Incorporated: Russia
- Founded: 2012; 14 years ago in Moscow, Russia
- Headquarters: Moscow, Russia
- Area served: Russia
- Revenue: 69.23 billion rubles (2024)
- Net income: 2.35 billion rubles (2024)
- Website: olimp.bet

Olimpbet is a sports betting company, the sixth largest bookmaker in Russia by revenue.

== History ==
The Russian sports betting company Olimpbet was established in 2012 in Moscow. In December of the same year, the company obtained a license to operate in the country as a regulated bookmaker.

== Operations ==
Olimpbet takes bets on over 30 sports, including soccer, ice hockey, basketball, volleyball, handball, rugby, tennis, baseball, badminton, Formula One, boxing, floorball, cricket, darts, combat sports, and cybersport. It allows players to bet on the FIFA World Cup, UEFA European Championship, UEFA Champions League, UEFA Europa League, Russian, British, and European national soccer leagues, National Hockey League (NHL), Kontinental Hockey League (KHL), National Basketball Association (NBA), Ultimate Fighting Championship (UFC), and more.

The bookmaker supports moneyline bets, in-play bets, score bets, proposition bets, and parlays (high-risk, high-reward linked wagers). The bookmaker's margin ranges from 3% to 8%. Olimpbet does not operate betting shops and instead suggests placing bets on the website and through its Android and iOS apps. The company is a member of the National Association of Bookmakers, the Unified Gambling Regulator, and the Unified Center for Interactive Bets.

The company runs broadcasts of sports events on its website. In 2019, Olimbpet entered into a partnership with Rambler Group to secure broadcast rights for the Premier League games, including those for bars, betting shops, and fan zones. Additionally, it became the official sponsor of the broadcast on the Okko Sports streaming platform, which is also part of the Rambler Group. The contract, worth EUR 18 to 22 million, was the largest bookmaker sponsorship contract to date in Russia.

== Sponsorships ==
As of 2024, Olimpbet was the title sponsor of the Russian Super Cup, the Russian Beach Soccer Championships, the Russian Beach Soccer Cup, the Supreme Hockey League, and the Junior Hockey League (JHL). It sponsors a number of hockey clubs, including Amur Khabarovsk, HC Spartak Moscow, HC Dynamo Moscow, HC Lada Togliatti, HC CSKA Moscow, Severstal Cherepovets, Admiral Vladivostok, HC Vityaz (KHL), and Krylya Sovetov Moscow (JHL)

The bookmaker also sponsors the VTB United League (basketball), the Handball Federation of Russia, and the Chekhovskiye Medvedi handball club. In the combat sports industry, Olimpbet sponsors the Russian Wrestling Federation, Poddubny Wrestling League, the Russian Cagefighting Championship, Top Dog FC, and supports non-professional MMA sports promotions.

Previously, Olimpbet was the sponsor of the Russian Premier League, the title sponsor of the Russian First League, and the Russian Cup (2017 to 2020). It also was the sponsor of the Russian Volleyball Federation, the Russian Basketball Federation, the Horse Race for the Russian President's Prize, and the Moscow Mayor Hockey Cup.

In 2022, Olimbet had sponsorship contracts worth 750 million rubles, compared to 300 million rubles in 2021. The company's ambassadors include mixed martial artist Sergei Pavlovich, actor Vladimir Sychyov, and TV host Otar Kushanashvili.

== Company ==
In 2023, the company got revenue of 52 billion rubles (+55.8% compared to 2022) and a profit of 1.8 billion rubles, a 244-fold increase. In 2024, Olimpbet was ranked the 11th largest digital advertiser in Russia. In 2024, the company acquired deposits worth 69.23 billion rubles and made pay-offs of 53.66 billion rubles. Its net profit for that year was 2.35 billion rubles.

In 2020, Forbes ranked Olimpbet eighth among the Russian bookmakers. In the 2025 RBC Market Research rating of the Russian bookmakers, the company was rated 8th as well. Olimpbet received numerous Bookmaker Ratings awards, including awards for its contributions to the development of hockey in Russia.
