= 2023 Russian Super Cup =

Zenit Saint Petersburg	CSKA Moscow
0	0
- Zenit Saint Petersburg won 5–4 on penalties
- Date: 15 July 2023
- Venue: Ak Bars Arena, Kazan
- Referee: Sergei Karasev
- Attendance: 40,876

The 2023 Russian Super Cup (Russian: Суперкубок России по футболу 2023) was the 21st edition of the Russian Super Cup, an annual football match organised jointly by the Russian Football Union and the Russian Premier League. It was contested by the reigning champions of the Russian Cup and the Russian Premier League. The match featured PFC CSKA Moscow, the champions of the 2022–23 Russian Cup, and FC Zenit Saint Petersburg, the winners of the 2022–23 Russian Premier League. It was played at Ak Bars Arena in Kazan, Russia and Zenit won 5–4 in a penalty shoot-out after the game ended goalless, its fourth consecutive title of Russian Super Cup.

== Teams ==
Team	Qualification	Previous participations (bold indicates winners)
Zenit Saint Petersburg	Winners of the 2022-23 Russian Premier League	10 (**2008**, **2011**, 2012, 2013, **2015**, **2016**, 2019, **2020**, **2021**, **2022**)
CSKA Moscow	Winners of the 2022-23 Russian Cup	11 (2003, **2004**, **2006**, **2007**, **2009**, 2010, 2011, **2013**, **2014**, 2016, **2018**)

== Match ==
=== Details ===
15 July 2023
17:00 MSK (UTC+3)

Zenit Saint Petersburg	0–0	CSKA Moscow
	Report
Penalties
Malcom (penalty scored); Sutormin (penalty scored); Mostovoy (penalty scored); Bakayev (penalty scored); Sergeyev (penalty missed); Renan (penalty scored)	5–4	(penalty scored) Chalov; (penalty scored) Gaich; (penalty scored) Nababkin; (penalty scored) Zabolotny; (penalty missed) Gajić; (penalty missed) Yermakov

Ak Bars Arena, Kazan
Attendance: 40,876
Referee: Sergei Karasev (Moscow)

GK	41	(Russia) Mikhail Kerzhakov
DF	2	(Russia) Dmitri Chistyakov
DF	77	(Brazil) Robert Renan
DF	3	(Brazil) Douglas Santos (c)
DF	15	(Russia) Vyacheslav Karavayev		(substituted off) 89'
MF	37	(Brazil) Du Queiroz		(substituted off) 89'
MF	31	(Brazil) Gustavo Mantuan		(substituted off) 90'
MF	5	(Colombia) Wilmar Barrios
MF	11	(Brazil) Claudinho	(yellow card) 45+3'	(substituted off) 63'
FW	30	(Colombia) Mateo Cassierra		(substituted off) 77'
FW	10	(Brazil) Malcom
Substitutes:
GK	13	(Russia) Nikita Goylo
GK	1	(Russia) Aleksandr Vasyutin
DF	19	(Russia) Aleksei Sutormin		(substituted on) 89'
DF	23	(Russia) Arsen Adamov
DF	28	(Kazakhstan) Nuraly Alip
DF	4	(Russia) Danil Krugovoy
MF	79	(Russia) Dmitri Vasilyev		(substituted on) 89'
MF	21	(Russia) Aleksandr Yerokhin
MF	18	(Russia) Aleksandr Kovalenko
MF	7	(Russia) Zelimkhan Bakayev		(substituted on) 90'
FW	17	(Russia) Andrei Mostovoy		(substituted on) 63'
FW	33	(Russia) Ivan Sergeyev		(substituted on) 77'
Manager:
(Russia) Sergei Semak

GK	35	(Russia) Igor Akinfeev (c)
DF	27	(Brazil) Moisés
DF	4	(Brazil) Willyan
MF	88	(Chile) Víctor Méndez		(substituted off) 90'
DF	78	(Russia) Igor Diveyev		(substituted off) 46'
MF	19	(Kazakhstan) Bakhtiyar Zaynutdinov		(substituted off) 81'
DF	22	(Serbia) Milan Gajić
MF	5	(Serbia) Saša Zdjelar		(substituted off) 81'
MF	6	(Russia) Maksim Mukhin		(substituted off) 73'
FW	91	(Russia) Anton Zabolotny
FW	9	(Russia) Fyodor Chalov	(yellow card) 45+3'
Substitutes:
GK	86	(Russia) Vladimir Shaykhutdinov
GK	49	(Russia) Vladislav Torop
DF	68	(Russia) Mikhail Ryadno		(substituted on) 81'
DF	90	(Russia) Matvey Lukin
DF	14	(Russia) Kirill Nababkin		(substituted on) 46'
DF	44	(Russia) Yegor Noskov
MF	20	(Russia) Konstantin Kuchayev		(substituted on) 81'
MF	72	(Russia) Nikita Yermakov		(substituted on) 73'
MF	31	(Russia) Matvey Kislyak
MF	10	(Russia) Ivan Oblyakov
FW	46	(Russia) Vladislav Yakovlev
FW	38	(Argentina) Adolfo Gaich		(substituted on) 90'
Manager:
(Russia) Vladimir Fedotov

Man of the Match: Mikhail Kerzhakov.

Assistant referees:
Igor Demeshko (Moscow)
Aleksey Lunyov (Novosibirsk)
Fourth official:
Artyom Chistyakov (Azov)
Inspector:
Nikolai Levnikov (Sochi)
VAR:
Vitali Meshkov (Dmitrov)
AVAR:
Maksim Gavrilin (Vladimir)

**Match rules**

- 90 minutes
- No extra time
- Penalty shoot-out if scores still level
- Eleven named substitutes
- Maximum of five substitutions
