= 2023–24 PFC CSKA Moscow season =

PFC CSKA Moscow
2023–24 season
- President: Yevgeni Giner
- Head coach: Vladimir Fedotov
- Stadium: VEB Arena
- Premier League: 6th
- Russian Cup: RPL path Final vs. Zenit St.Petersburg
- Super Cup: Runners-up
- Top goalscorer: League: Fyodor Chalov (12); All: Fyodor Chalov (16)
- Highest home attendance: 20,497 vs Zenit St.Petersburg (3 September 2023)
- Lowest home attendance: 4,791 vs Rostov (3 December 2023)
- Average home league attendance: 9,528 (25 May 2024)
Home colours	Away colours	Third colours
- All statistics correct as of 21 March 2024.

The 2023–24 season is PFC CSKA Moscow's 113th season in existence and 31st consecutive in the Russian Premier League. They will also compete in the Russian Cup and the Russian Super Cup.

== Season events ==
On 17 June, CSKA activated a clause in their loan deal with Moisés to make his moving from Internacional a permanent one, with the Brazilian defender signing until the summer of 2026 with the option for another year.

On 2 July, Yegor Shevelev left CSKA by mutual agreement, and Vadim Konyukhov joined Akron Tolyatti on loan for the season with the option for the move to be made permanent.

On 3 July, Ilya Pomazun extended his contract with CSKA until the summer of 2028, and extended his loan deal with Ural Yekaterinburg for the season.

On 5 July, CSKA announced that both Arnór Sigurðsson and Chidera Ejuke had exercised their rights to suspend their CSKA contracts for another season, with Sigurðsson having already been announced as a new signing for Blackburn Rovers and Ejuke joining Royal Antwerp at the end of July.

On 10 July, Jesús Medina left CSKA to join Moscow rivals Spartak Moscow.

On 12 July, Danila Bokov extended his contract with CSKA until the summer of 2025, and then moved on loan to Chayka Peschanokopskoye for the season.

On 14 July, CSKA announced that Mikhail Ryadno had signed his first professional contract with the club, until the summer of 2025 with an option to extended it.

On 19 July, CSKA announced that Renat Golybin had signed his first professional contract with the club.

On 24 July, Matvey Lukin extended his contract with CSKA until the summer of 2025, with the option for another year.

On 26 July, Vladislav Yakovlev extended his contract with CSKA until the summer of 2026, and then moved on loan to Khimki for the season.

On 27 July, CSKA announced that Vadim Churilov had signed his first professional contract with the club, until the summer of 2025.

On 1 August, CSKA extended their contract with Matvey Kislyak until the summer of 2028.

On 3 August, Ilya Kazakov left CSKA to sign for Zvezda St.Petersburg.

On 4 August, CSKA announced the singing of Abbosbek Fayzullaev from Pakhtakor on a contract until the summer of 2026 with the option for another year.

On 7 August, CSKA extended their contract with Vladimir Shaykhutdinov until the summer of 2026.

On 18 August, Yaroslav Dol extended his contract with CSKA until the summer of 2025, and then joined Dynamo Bryansk on loan for the season.

On 21 August, CSKA announced the singing of Víctor Dávila from León on a contract until the summer of 2027 with the option for another year, and the departure of Bakhtiyar Zaynutdinov from the club to Beşiktaş.

On 27 August, Jorge Carrascal left CSKA to join Moscow rivals Dynamo Moscow.

On 1 September, CSKA announced the singing of Khellven from Athletico Paranaense on a contract until the summer of 2028.

On 13 September, Yegor Ushakov joined Krylia Sovetov on loan for the season, with an option to make the move permanent.

On 14 September, CSKA extended their contract with Adolfo Gaich until the summer of 2026, with the Argentine forward joining Çaykur Rizespor for the season. On the same day, Vadim Karpov joined Ufa on loan for the first half of the season, Kristijan Bistrović joined Baltika Kaliningrad on loan for the season with an option to make the move permanent, and Yegor Noskov extended his contract with CSKA until the summer of 2026 and joined Volga Ulyanovsk on loan for the season.

On 15 September, Lassana N'Diaye permanently left CSKA to sign for Radnički Niš.

On 6 December, Atlético Mineiro exercised an option to extended their loan deal with CSKA for Bruno Fuchs until December 2024, with an obligation to make the move permanent if certain stipulations are met.

On 7 December, CSKA announced that they had extended their contract with Kirill Glebov until the end of the 2026–27 season.

On 19 December, CSKA announced the return of Tamerlan Musayev, a former youth team player, to the club from Baltika Kaliningrad on a contract until the end of the 2027–28 season.

On 28 December, Nikita Yermakov joined Pari Nizhny Novgorod on loan for the remainder of the season with an option to make the move permanent.

On 13 January, CSKA announced that Yaroslav Arbuzov had left the club to join Baltika Kaliningrad, with the club retaining an buy back option.

On 17 January, CSKA announced that Danil Krugovoy would join the club from Zenit St.Petersburg at the end of the season on a contract until the end of the 2027–28 season.

On 18 January, CSKA announced that youth team players Savva Ponomarev, Rustam Zagidullin, Maxim Kuznetsov, Zaid Koblev and Mikhail Gainov had all left the club at the end of the previous year.

On 29 January, Vadim Karpov's loan deal with Ufa was extended until the end of the season.

On 14 February, CSKA announced that Luka Zgursky had left the club after his contract was terminated by mutual agreement.

On 20 February, CSKA announced the signing of Sid Ahmed Aissaoui from USM Alger on a contract until the end of the 2025–26 season.

On 21 February, CSKA announced that Dmitry Kalaida had left the club to join Pari Nizhny Novgorod, with the club retaining an buy back option, and that Makar Pestov had joined Akron Tolyatti on loan for the remainder of the season with the option to make the move permanent.

On 22 February, CSKA announced the loan signing, with the option to make the move permanent, of Amirhossein Rivandi from KIA Academy, whilst Konstantin Kuchayev left the club after his contract was ended by mutual agreement.

On 24 May, Igor Akinfeev extended his contract with CSKA until the end of the 2025–26 season.

== Squad ==
As of match played 25 May 2024

Number	Name	Nationality	Position	Date of birth (age)	Signed from	Signed in	Contract ends	Apps.	Goals
Goalkeepers
35	Igor Akinfeev (captain)	(Russia)	GK	8 April 1986 (aged 38)	Academy	2003	2026	767	0
49	Vladislav Torop	(Russia)	GK	7 November 2003 (aged 20)	Academy	2019	2026	24	0
86	Vladimir Shaykhutdinov	(Russia)	GK	4 June 2004 (aged 19)	Academy	2022	2026	1	0
Defenders
2	Khellven	(Brazil)	DF	25 February 2001 (aged 23)	Athletico Paranaense	2023	2028	31	1
4	Willyan Rocha	(Brazil)	DF	27 January 1995 (aged 29)	Portimonense	2022		68	6
14	Kirill Nababkin (vice-captain)	(Russia)	DF	8 September 1986 (aged 37)	Moscow	2010	2024	324	5
22	Milan Gajić	(Serbia)	DF	28 January 1996 (aged 28)	Red Star Belgrade	2022		81	6
27	Moisés	(Brazil)	DF	11 March 1995 (aged 29)	Internacional	2023	2026	70	2
68	Mikhail Ryadno	(Russia)	DF	18 September 2005 (aged 18)	Academy	2023	2025	12	1
77	Ilya Agapov	(Russia)	DF	21 January 2001 (aged 23)	Pari Nizhny Novgorod	2023		28	2
78	Igor Diveyev	(Russia)	DF	27 September 1999 (aged 24)	Ufa	2019	2024	149	11
90	Matvey Lukin	(Russia)	DF	27 April 2004 (aged 20)	Academy	2022	2025	14	0
96	Amirhossein Reyvandi	(Iran)	DF	8 March 2004 (aged 20)	KIA Academy	2024	2024	2	0
Midfielders
5	Saša Zdjelar	(Serbia)	MF	20 March 1995 (aged 29)	Partizan	2022		75	1
6	Maksim Mukhin	(Russia)	MF	4 November 2001 (aged 22)	Lokomotiv Moscow	2021	2026	68	3
10	Ivan Oblyakov	(Russia)	MF	5 July 1998 (aged 25)	Ufa	2018		212	21
17	Kirill Glebov	(Russia)	MF	10 November 2005 (aged 18)	Academy	2023	2027	20	2
19	Sid Ahmed Aissaoui	(Algeria)	MF	11 January 2005 (aged 19)	USM Alger	2024	2026	0	0
21	Abbosbek Fayzullaev	(Uzbekistan)	MF	3 October 2003 (aged 20)	Pakhtakor	2023	2026	32	5
31	Matvey Kislyak	(Russia)	MF	26 July 2005 (aged 18)	Academy	2023	2028	9	1
88	Víctor Méndez	(Chile)	MF	23 September 1999 (aged 24)	Unión Española	2022		70	1
Forwards
7	Víctor Dávila	(Chile)	FW	4 November 1997 (aged 26)	León	2023	2027	33	6
9	Fyodor Chalov	(Russia)	FW	10 April 1998 (aged 26)	Academy	2015	2024	261	89
11	Tamerlan Musayev	(Russia)	FW	29 July 2001 (aged 22)	Baltika Kaliningrad	2023	2028	17	6
47	Renat Golybin	(Russia)	FW	30 August 2005 (aged 18)	Academy	2023		1	0
91	Anton Zabolotny	(Russia)	FW	13 June 1991 (aged 32)	Sochi	2021	2024	104	21
Away on loan
	Danila Bokov	(Russia)	GK	8 September 2002 (aged 21)	Academy	2021	2025	1	0
	Ilya Pomazun	(Russia)	GK	16 August 1996 (aged 27)	Academy	2012	2028	10	0
	Bruno Fuchs	(Brazil)	DF	1 April 1999 (aged 25)	Internacional	2020		19	0
	Vadim Karpov	(Russia)	DF	14 July 2002 (aged 21)	Academy	2019		33	1
	Vadim Konyukhov	(Russia)	DF	5 January 2002 (aged 22)	Academy	2021		0	0
	Yegor Noskov	(Russia)	DF	24 March 2003 (aged 21)	Academy	2023	2026	7	0
	Andrei Savinov	(Russia)	DF	14 May 2002 (aged 22)	Academy	2021		0	0
	Kristijan Bistrović	(Croatia)	MF	9 April 1998 (aged 26)	Slaven Belupo	2018	2025	96	8
	Makar Pestov	(Russia)	MF	13 January 2004 (aged 20)	Academy	2022		0	0
	Yegor Ushakov	(Russia)	MF	2 December 2002 (aged 21)	Academy	2021		14	1
	Nikita Yermakov	(Russia)	MF	19 January 2003 (aged 21)	Academy	2022		41	3
	Adolfo Gaich	(Argentina)	FW	26 February 1999 (aged 25)	San Lorenzo	2020	2025	37	3
	Ilya Shkurin	(Belarus)	FW	17 August 1999 (aged 24)	Dynamo Brest	2020	2024	19	3
	Chidera Ejuke	(Nigeria)	FW	2 January 1998 (aged 26)	SC Heerenveen	2020	2024	65	10
	Yaroslav Dol	(Russia)	FW	10 May 2004 (aged 20)	Academy	2022	2025	0	0
	Vladislav Yakovlev	(Russia)	FW	14 February 2002 (aged 22)	Academy	2021	2026	34	1
Players who left during the season
19	Bakhtiyar Zaynutdinov	(Kazakhstan)	MF	2 April 1998 (aged 26)	Rostov	2020	2025	83	7
20	Konstantin Kuchayev	(Russia)	MF	18 March 1998 (aged 26)	Academy	2015	2024	152	11
80	Yaroslav Arbuzov	(Russia)	MF	12 January 2004 (aged 20)	Academy	2019		4	1
	Lassana N'Diaye	(Mali)	FW	3 October 2000 (aged 23)	Guidars	2018	2024	0	0

== Transfers ==
=== In ===
Date	Position	Nationality	Name	From	Fee	Ref.
17 June 2023	DF	(Brazil)	Moisés	Internacional	Undisclosed	
4 August 2023	MF	(Uzbekistan)	Abbosbek Fayzullaev	Pakhtakor	Undisclosed	
21 August 2023	FW	(Chile)	Víctor Dávila	León	Undisclosed	
1 September 2023	DF	(Brazil)	Khellven	Athletico Paranaense	Undisclosed	
19 December 2023	FW	(Russia)	Tamerlan Musayev	Baltika Kaliningrad	Undisclosed	
20 February 2024	MF	(Algeria)	Sid Ahmed Aissaoui	USM Alger	Undisclosed	

=== Loans in ===
Date from	Position	Nationality	Name	From	Date to	Ref.
22 February 2024	DF	(Iran)	Amirhossein Reyvandi	KIA Tehran	End of season	

=== Out ===
Date	Position	Nationality	Name	To	Fee	Ref.
20 June 2024	MF	(Russia)	Tigran Avanesyan	Baltika Kaliningrad	Undisclosed	
20 June 2024	MF	(Russia)	Sergei Pryakhin	Baltika Kaliningrad	Undisclosed	
10 July 2023	MF	(Paraguay)	Jesús Medina	Spartak Moscow	Undisclosed	
3 August 2023	DF	(Russia)	Ilya Kazakov	Zvezda St.Petersburg	Undisclosed	
21 August 2023	MF	(Kazakhstan)	Bakhtiyar Zaynutdinov	Beşiktaş	Undisclosed	
27 August 2023	MF	(Colombia)	Jorge Carrascal	Dynamo Moscow	Undisclosed	
15 September 2023	FW	(Mali)	Lassana N'Diaye	Radnički Niš	Undisclosed	
22 December 2023	MF	(Iceland)	Arnór Sigurðsson	Blackburn Rovers	Undisclosed	
1 January 2024	DF	(Russia)	Denis Pershin	Arsenal Tula	Undisclosed	
13 January 2024	MF	(Russia)	Yaroslav Arbuzov	Baltika Kaliningrad	Undisclosed	
21 February 2024	MF	(Russia)	Dmitry Kalaida	Pari Nizhny Novgorod	Undisclosed	

=== Loans out ===
Date from	Position	Nationality	Name	To	Date to	Ref.
1 January 2023	DF	(Brazil)	Bruno Fuchs	Atlético Mineiro	December 2024	
24 June 2024	DF	(Russia)	Andrei Savinov	SKA-Khabarovsk	End of season	
2 July 2023	DF	(Russia)	Vadim Konyukhov	Akron Tolyatti	End of season	
3 July 2023	GK	(Russia)	Ilya Pomazun	Ural Yekaterinburg	End of season	
12 July 2023	GK	(Russia)	Danila Bokov	Chayka Peschanokopskoye	End of season	
26 July 2023	FW	(Russia)	Vladislav Yakovlev	Khimki	End of season	
18 August 2023	FW	(Russia)	Yaroslav Dol	Dynamo Bryansk	End of season	
13 September 2023	FW	(Russia)	Yegor Ushakov	Krylia Sovetov	End of season	
14 September 2023	DF	(Russia)	Vadim Karpov	Ufa	End of season	
14 September 2023	DF	(Russia)	Yegor Noskov	Volga Ulyanovsk	End of season	
14 September 2023	MF	(Croatia)	Kristijan Bistrović	Baltika Kaliningrad	End of season	
14 September 2023	FW	(Argentina)	Adolfo Gaich	Çaykur Rizespor	End of season	
28 December 2023	MF	(Russia)	Nikita Yermakov	Pari Nizhny Novgorod	End of season	
21 February 2024	MF	(Russia)	Makar Pestov	Akron Tolyatti	End of season	

=== Contract suspensions ===
Date	Position	Nationality	Name	Joined	Date	Ref.
21 June 2023	MF	(Iceland)	Arnór Sigurðsson	Blackburn Rovers	22 December 2023	
5 July 2023	FW	(Nigeria)	Chidera Ejuke	Royal Antwerp	30 June 2024	

=== Released ===
Date	Position	Nationality	Name	Joined	Date	Ref.
2 July 2023	FW	(Russia)	Yegor Shevelev			
31 December 2023	DF	(Russia)	Rustam Zagidullin			
31 December 2023	MF	(Russia)	Zaid Koblev	Druzhba Maykop		
31 December 2023	MF	(Russia)	Maxim Kuznetsov			
31 December 2023	MF	(Russia)	Savva Ponomarev	Kompozit Pavlovsky Posad		
31 December 2023	FW	(Russia)	Mikhail Gainov	Kuban Krasnodar		
14 February 2024	FW	(Russia)	Luka Zgursky	Andijon		
22 February 2024	MF	(Russia)	Konstantin Kuchayev	Pari Nizhny Novgorod		
18 June 2024	FW	(Russia)	Anton Zabolotny	Khimki	19 June 2024	
30 June 2024	DF	(Russia)	Kirill Nababkin	SKA Rostov-on-Don	10 August 2024	
30 June 2024	FW	(Belarus)	Ilya Shkurin	Stal Mielec	1 July 2024	
30 June 2024	FW	(Nigeria)	Chidera Ejuke	Sevilla	1 July 2024	

== Friendlies ==
4 July 2023	CSKA Moscow	4 – 0	Neftekhimik	Moscow
17:00 MSK (UTC+3)	Chalov 37', 46'; Zdjelar 58'; Arbuzov 82'	Report	Kasatkin (yellow card) 63'	Stadium: VEB Arena; Attendance: 3,580

8 July 2023	CSKA Moscow	0 – 5	Dynamo Moscow	Moscow
13:30 MSK (UTC+3)	Akinfeev (yellow card) 27'; Zabolotny (yellow card) 35'; Zaynutdinov (yellow card) 37'	Report	Gladyshev 26'; Goalkeeper competition Zakharyan 60'; Penalty shooter competition Mazurin 70'; Lepsky (red card) 90'	Stadium: VEB Arena

9 July 2023	Dynamo Moscow	6 – 3	CSKA Moscow	Moscow
16:30 MSK (UTC+3)	Goalkeeper competition Grulyov 49', 50' Penalty shooter competition Smolov 69'; Mazurin 90'	Report	Gaich 29'; Yermakov 31'; Gajić 37'	Stadium: VTB Arena

21 January 2024	CSKA Moscow	4 – 1	Sohar	Abu Dhabi, United Arab Emirates
18:00 MSK (UTC+3)	Zabolotny 4'; Oblyakov 12', 25'; Al-Saadi 31' (o.g.)	Report	Dzhukhar 55'

25 January 2024	CSKA Moscow	3 – 2	Torpedo Moscow	Abu Dhabi, United Arab Emirates
10:00 MSK (UTC+3)	Musayev 16'; Willyan 48'; Oblyakov 54'	Report	Lebedenko 11'; Poloz 45'

1 February 2024	CSKA Moscow	2 – 0	Andijon	Abu Dhabi, United Arab Emirates
16:00 MSK (UTC+3)	Zabolotny 8'; Dávila (yellow card) 55'; Musayev 59'; Glebov (yellow card) 80'	Report	Hebaj (yellow card) 90'

5 February 2024	CSKA Moscow	1 – 0	Fakel Voronezh	Abu Dhabi, United Arab Emirates
17:30 MSK (UTC+3)	Dávila 47'; Abdulkadyrov (yellow card) 55'	Report	Masternoy (yellow card) 32' (red card) 75'; Poyarkov (yellow card) 67'

9 February 2024	CSKA Moscow	1 – 2	Sochi	Abu Dhabi, United Arab Emirates
15:00 MSK (UTC+3)	Kislyak (yellow card) 3'; Dávila 10' (yellow card) 87'; Musayev (yellow card) 47'; Glebov (yellow card) 72'	Report	Burmistrov 12'; Makarchuk (yellow card) 31'; Kramarič 43'

16 February 2024	CSKA Moscow	4 – 0	Rodina Moscow	Abu Dhabi, United Arab Emirates
17:00 MSK (UTC+3)	Willyan (yellow card) 11'; Musayev 19'; Dávila 32'; Oblyakov 43'; Chalov 90' (pen.)	Report	Wesley (yellow card) 30'

20 February 2024	CSKA Moscow	3 – 0	Khimki	Abu Dhabi, United Arab Emirates
17:00 MSK (UTC+3)	Chalov 50', 59'; Dávila 54'	Report

24 February 2024	CSKA Moscow	1 – 2	Dynamo Moscow	Moscow
17:00 MSK (UTC+3)	Moisés (yellow card) 9'; Gajić 72'	Report	Grulyov 82'; Carrascal 89'

22 March 2024	CSKA Moscow	2 – 1	Bunyodkor	Moscow
19:00 MSK (UTC+3)	Zabolotny 10'; Khellven 13'	Report	Mirakhmadov 85'	Stadium: VEB Arena

== Competitions ==
=== Overall record ===
Competition	First match	Last match	Starting round	Final position	Record							
Competition	First match	Last match	Starting round	Final position	Pld	W	D	L	GF	GA	GD	Win %
Premier League	22 July 2023	25 May 2024	Matchday 1	6th	30	12	12	6	56	40	+16	40.00
Russian Cup	26 July 2023	15 May 2025	Group stage	RPL path Final	12	5	6	1	18	7	+11	41.67
Super Cup	15 July 2023		Final	Runners-up	1	0	1	0	0	0	+0	0.00
Total					43	17	19	7	74	47	+27	39.53

Last updated: 25 May 2024
Source: Soccerway

=== Super Cup ===
15 July 2023	Zenit St.Petersburg	0 – 0 (5 – 4 p)	CSKA Moscow	Kazan
17:00 MSK (UTC+3)	Claudinho (yellow card) 45+3'	Report	Gajić (yellow card) 45+3'	Stadium: Kazan Arena; Attendance: 42,873; Referee: Sergei Karasev
	Penalties
	Malcom (penalty scored); Sutormin (penalty scored); Mostovoy (penalty scored); Bakaev (penalty scored); Sergeev (penalty missed); Renan (penalty scored)		Chalov (penalty scored); Gaich (penalty scored); Nababkin (penalty scored); Zabolotny (penalty scored); Gajić (penalty missed); Ermakov (penalty missed)

=== Premier League ===
==== League table ====
Pos	Team	Pld	W	D	L	GF	GA	GD	Pts
4	Lokomotiv Moscow	30	14	11	5	52	38	+14	53
5	Spartak Moscow	30	14	8	8	41	32	+9	50
6	CSKA Moscow	30	12	12	6	56	40	+16	48
7	Rostov	30	12	7	11	43	46	−3	43
8	Rubin Kazan	30	11	9	10	31	38	−7	42

Source: Premier Liga
Rules for classification: 1) Points; 2) Head-to-head points; 3) Head-to-head matches won; 4) Head-to-head goal difference; 5) Head-to-head goals scored; 6) Matches won; 7) Goal difference; 8) Goals scored; 9) 2022–23 position (not applicable to final standings); 10) Play-off. Note: if teams tied on points played an equal number of head-to-head games, head-to-head results are considered in aggregate, in a separate 'table'. If teams tied on points played a different number of head-to-head games, head-to-head criteria are considered in one-on-one pairs for each team against each other, then the teams are ordered by the number of one-on-one matchups they have advantage in.

==== Results summary ====
Overall								Home						Away					
Pld	W	D	L	GF	GA	GD	Pts	W	D	L	GF	GA	GD	W	D	L	GF	GA	GD
30	12	12	6	56	40	+16	48	8	5	2	29	16	+13	4	7	4	27	24	+3

Last updated: 25 May 2024.

==== Results by round ====
Round	1	2	3	4	5	6	7	8	9	10	11	12	13	14	15	16	17	18	19	20	22	23	24	25	21^{1}	26	27	28	29	30
Ground	A	A	H	H	A	A	H	H	A	H	A	A	H	H	A	H	H	A	H	A	A	H	A	A	H	A	H	A	A	H
Result	L	W	W	W	L	D	D	D	D	W	D	D	W	W	D	L	W	L	D	W	D	W	D	L	D	L	D	W	W	W
Position	13	8	5	3	5	7	7	7	9	5	5	6	4	3	5	6	5	8	7	4	4	4	4	6	7	8	8	6	6	6

Updated to match(es) played on 25 May 2024. Source:
A = Away; H = Home; W = Win; D = Draw; L = Loss
Notes:
- ^{1}

==== Matches ====
The league fixtures were unveiled on 24 June 2023.

22 July 2023 1	Ural Yekaterinburg	2 – 1	CSKA Moscow	Yekaterinburg
13:00 MSK (UTC+3)	Ayupov 21'; Kulakov (yellow card) 34'; Miškić 54' (pen.); Pomazun (yellow card) 90+4'	Report	Zabolotnyi 62'; Moisés (yellow card) 75'; Gaich (yellow card) 90+4'	Stadium: Yekaterinburg Arena; Attendance: 13,525; Referee: Aleksei Amelin

30 July 2023 2	Akhmat Grozny	2 – 3	CSKA Moscow	Grozny
20:00 MSK (UTC+3)	Bystrov (red card) 12'; Konaté 27' (pen.), 45+' (pen.); Semyonov (yellow card) 65' (yellow-red card) 90+'; Kamilov (yellow card) 79'; Sheliya (yellow card) 90+'	Report	Chalov 13' (pen.), 45+' (pen.), 79' (pen.); Zaynutdinov (yellow card) 19'; Gajić (red card) 45+'	Stadium: Akhmat-Arena; Attendance: 5,612; Referee: Vladislav Bezborodov

5 August 2023 3	CSKA Moscow	4 – 1	Lokomotiv Moscow	Moscow
20:00 MSK (UTC+3)	Chalov 29' (pen.); Gajić 31'; Mukhin 55', 63'	Report	Barinov (yellow card) 13'; Pogostnov 62'	Stadium: VEB Arena; Attendance: 12,560; Referee: Kirill Levnikov

13 August 2023 4	CSKA Moscow	3 – 1	Sochi	Moscow
20:00 MSK (UTC+3)	Moisés (yellow card) 12'; Mukhin (yellow card) 29'; Đorđević 51' (o.g.); Zabolotnyi 89'; Ryadno 90+4'	Report	Đorđević (yellow card) 15'; Alves (yellow card) 34' (yellow-red card) 47'; Miguel 78'; Miladinović (yellow card) 87'; Kravtsov (yellow card) 90'	Stadium: VEB Arena; Attendance: 7,150; Referee: Artem Chistyakov

19 August 2023 5	Dynamo Moscow	2 – 1	CSKA Moscow	Moscow
15:00 MSK (UTC+3)	Ngamaleu (yellow card) 34', (goal) 46'; Smolov (yellow card) 77', (goal) 83'	Report	Zabolotniy 6'; Willyan (yellow card) 41'	Stadium: VTB Arena; Attendance: 18,584; Referee: Pavel Kukuyan

25 August 2023 6	Orenburg	1 – 1	CSKA Moscow	Orenburg
17:30 MSK (UTC+3)	Pérez (yellow card) 34'; Vera 70'	Report	Willyan (yellow card) 37'; Moisés 49'; Zablotnyi (yellow card) 67'; Zdjelar (yellow card) 88'	Stadium: Gazovik Stadium; Attendance: 4,283; Referee: Kirill Levnikov

3 September 2023 7	CSKA Moscow	1 – 1	Zenit St.Petersburg	Moscow
17:30 MSK (UTC+3)	Zabolotnyi 4', (yellow card) 90+6'; Willyan (yellow card) 90+5'; Méndez (yellow card) 90+6'	Report	Santos 88', (yellow card) 90+5'; Alip (yellow card) 90+5'; Claudinho (yellow card) 90+6'	Stadium: VEB Arena; Attendance: 20,497; Referee: Pavel Kukuyan

16 September 2023 8	CSKA Moscow	2 – 2	Krylya Sovetov Samara	Moscow
14:00 MSK (UTC+3)	Zabolotnyi 32' (pen.); Willyan (yellow card) 37' (yellow-red card) 62'; Zdjelar (yellow card) 40'; Chalov 75'	Report	Rasskazov 2'; Saltykov 22'; Lomaev (yellow card) 31'; Costanza (yellow card) 67'; Bijl (yellow card) 88'; Soldatenkov (red card) 90'	Stadium: VEB Arena; Attendance: 8,109; Referee: Artem Lyubimov

24 September 2023 9	Rostov	3 – 3	CSKA Moscow	Rostov-on-Don
19:00 MSK (UTC+3)	Mironov 7'; Golenkov 12', 50'; Prokhin (yellow card) 90+3'	Report	Khellven 26'; Chalov (yellow card) 45+2', (goal) 65'; Fayzullaev 70'	Stadium: Rostov Arena; Attendance: 15,050; Referee: Sergei Karasev

30 September 2023 10	CSKA Moscow	1 – 0	Baltika Kaliningrad	Moscow
19:00 MSK (UTC+3)	Dávila 18'; Fayzullaev (yellow card) 70'	Report	Ostojić (yellow card) 30'; Gassama (yellow card) 68'	Stadium: VEB Arena; Attendance: 8,135; Referee: Yan Bobrovskiy

8 October 2023 11	Spartak Moscow	2 – 2	CSKA Moscow	Moscow
19:00 MSK (UTC+3)	Promes 39'; Reabciuk (yellow card) 68'; Medina 90+6'	Report	Gajić 31', 60', (yellow card) 90+6'; Moisés (yellow card) 80'; Fayzullaev (yellow card) 90'	Stadium: Otkritie Arena; Attendance: 25,245; Referee: Kirill Levnikov

21 October 2023 12	Rubin Kazan	0 – 0	CSKA Moscow	Kazan
14:00 MSK (UTC+3)	Gritsaenko (yellow card) 36'; Daku (yellow card) 46'; Vujačić (yellow card) 62'	Report	Willyan (yellow card) 45'; Chalov (yellow card) 60'; Zabolotnyi (yellow card) 62'; Mukhin (yellow card) 74'	Stadium: Kazan Arena; Attendance: 16,929; Referee: Pavel Kukuyan

29 October 2023 13	CSKA Moscow	1 – 0	Krasnodar	Moscow
19:30 MSK (UTC+3)	Chalov (yellow card) 35', (goal) 41'; Fayzullaev (yellow card) 90+2'	Report	Olaza (yellow card) 27'; Chernikov (yellow card) 44'; Batxi (yellow card) 72'	Stadium: VEB Arena; Attendance: 10,777; Referee: Kirill Levnikov

5 November 2023 14	CSKA Moscow	3 – 2	Nizhny Novgorod	Moscow
16:30 MSK (UTC+3)	Zdjelar (yellow card) 30'; Chalov 37'; Moisés (yellow card) 44'; Willyan (yellow card) 65'; Yuldoshev 71' (o.g.); Dávila 73', (yellow card) 74'; Zabolotnyi (yellow card) 90+2'	Report	Stotsky 33'; Aleksandrov 40'; Troshechkin (yellow card) 45'; Kakkoev (yellow card) 45+3'; Tolstopyatov (yellow card) 75'; Zhigulev (yellow card) 88'	Stadium: VEB Arena; Attendance: 6,096; Referee: Vladimir Moskalyov

11 November 2023 15	Fakel Voronezh	1 – 1	CSKA Moscow	Voronezh
14:00 MSK (UTC+3)	Yakimov (yellow card) 82'; Bozhin 90+3'	Report	Dávila 10'	Stadium: Tsentralnyi Profsoyuz Stadion; Attendance: 13,454; Referee: Aleksey Sukhoi

25 November 2023 16	CSKA Moscow	2 – 3	Dynamo Moscow	Moscow
17:30 MSK (UTC+3)	Fayzullaev 23'; Zabolotnyi 40'; Willyan (yellow card) 77'	Report	Bitello 7', 54'; Fernández (yellow card) 58'; Balbuena (yellow card) 62'; Tyukavin 74'; Laxalt (yellow card) 83'; Leshchuk (yellow card) 90+3'	Stadium: VEB Arena; Attendance: 8,243; Referee: Sergei Karasev

3 December 2023 17	CSKA Moscow	2 – 0	Rostov	Moscow
14:00 MSK (UTC+3)	Chalov 4' (pen.); Méndez 69'	Report	Golenkov (yellow card) 32'; Komarov (yellow card) 81'; Melekhin (red card) 90+2'	Stadium: VEB Arena; Attendance: 4,791; Referee: Rafael Shafeev

10 December 2023 18	Krasnodar	1 – 0	CSKA Moscow	Krasnodar
19:45 MSK (UTC+3)	Chernikov (yellow card) 37'; Batxi (yellow card) 75'; Krivtsov 90', (yellow card) 90+1'	Report	Zdjelar (yellow card) 61'	Stadium: Krasnodar Stadium; Attendance: 32,793; Referee: Sergei Karasev

2 March 2024 19	CSKA Moscow	1 – 1	Orenburg	Moscow
14:00 MSK (UTC+3)	Musaev 81'	Report	Pérez 90+4'; Florentín (yellow card) 90+6'	Stadium: VEB Arena; Attendance: 6,144; Referee: Sergey Ivanov

8 March 2024 20	Krylya Sovetov Samara	0 – 2	CSKA Moscow	Samara
15:00 MSK (UTC+3)	Evgenyev (yellow card) 21'; Orozco 85'; Costanza (yellow card) 90+4'	Report	Willyan 3', 49', (yellow card) 17'; Moisés (yellow card) 14'; Dávila (yellow card) 56'	Stadium: Samara Arena; Attendance: 8,278; Referee: Vitali Meshkov

30 March 2024 22	Sochi	2 – 2	CSKA Moscow	Sochi
16:00 MSK (UTC+3)	Chistyakov (yellow card) 8'; Guarirapa 50'; Kramarič 73'; Kravtsov (yellow card) 86'	Report	Chistyakov 16' (o.g.); Zabolotny 46'; Zdjelar (yellow card) 86'; Oblyakov (yellow card) 87'	Stadium: Fisht Olympic Stadium; Attendance: 5,681; Referee: Vasily Kazartsev

7 April 2024 23	CSKA Moscow	4 – 1	Fakel Voronezh	Moscow
14:00 MSK (UTC+3)	Musayev 36'; Gajić (yellow card) 53'; Oblyakov 60'; Willyan (yellow card) 73'; Fayzullaev 75'; Chalov 90'	Report	Cherov 90+'	Stadium: VEB Arena; Attendance: 8,778; Referee: Pavel Shadykhanov

13 April 2024 24	Lokomotiv Moscow	3 – 3	CSKA Moscow	Moscow
19:30 MSK (UTC+3)	Glushenkov (yellow card) 24'; Samoshnikov 44'; Morozov 55'; Fasson 64' (yellow card) 90+'; Mitaj (yellow card) 90'	Report	Musayev 53'; Zabolotny 80'; Agapov 87'	Stadium: RZD Arena; Attendance: 15,070; Referee: Sergei Karasev

20 April 2024 25	CSKA Moscow	1 – 2	Akhmat Grozny	Moscow
19:30 MSK (UTC+3)	Fayzullaev (yellow card) 7'; Willyan (red card) 19'; Diveyev (yellow card) 44' (red card) 89'; Moisés (yellow card) 56'; Chalov 63' (pen.)	Report	Camilo (yellow card) 33'; Semyonov (yellow card) 39'; Kovachev (yellow card) 67'; Konaté 79'; Berisha 87'	Stadium: VEB Arena; Attendance: 6,980; Referee: Rafael Shafeev

25 April 2024 21	CSKA Moscow	0 – 0	Spartak Moscow	Moscow
20:30 MSK (UTC+3)	Moisés (yellow card) 89'	Report	Duarte (yellow card) 45'	Stadium: VEB Arena; Attendance: 18,495; Referee: Vasily Kazartsev

28 April 2024 26	Baltika Kaliningrad	3 – 1	CSKA Moscow	Kaliningrad
21:30 MSK (UTC+3)	Andrade (yellow card) 40'; Bistrović 51' (pen.); Rybchinsky (yellow card) 60'; Fernandes 76'; Kaplenko 85'; Gassama (yellow card) 89'; Latyshonok (yellow card) 90+2'	Report	Musayev (yellow card) 54'; Gajić (yellow card) 61'; Glebov (yellow card) 83' (goal) 90+2'	Stadium: Kaliningrad Stadium; Attendance: 14,046; Referee: Yan Bobrovsky

6 May 2024 27	CSKA Moscow	2 – 2	Rubin Kazan	Moscow
20:30 MSK (UTC+3)	Fayzullaev 45+'; Willyan (yellow card) 57'; Chalov 74'	Report	Rozhkov 42'; Zotov (yellow card) 60'; Rybus (yellow card) 65'; Daku 90+'	Stadium: VEB Arena; Attendance: 5,740; Referee: Vladislav Bezborodov

11 May 2024 28	Zenit St.Petersburg	0 – 1	CSKA Moscow	Saint Petersburg
19:00 MSK (UTC+3)	Santos (yellow card) 28'; Claudinho (yellow card) 84'	Report	Zabolotnyi (yellow card) 26'; Moisés (yellow card) 47'; Chalov 58'; Zdjelar (yellow card) 80'; Willyan (yellow card) 84'; Torop (yellow card) 90+3'	Stadium: Krestovsky Stadium; Attendance: 33,027; Referee: Sergey Ivanov

20 May 2024 29	Pari Nizhny Novgorod	2 – 6	CSKA Moscow	Nizhny Novgorod
20:00 MSK (UTC+3)	Zhivoglyadov (yellow card) 33'; Stotsky 48'; Kakkoyev (yellow card) 59'; Boselli 77'; Kalinsky (yellow card) 81'	Report	Agapov (yellow card) 5'; Oblyakov 10'; Musayev 22'; Zdjelar 37'; Dávila 57'; Zabolotny 83'; Glebov 90'	Stadium: Nizhny Novgorod Stadium; Attendance: 13,361; Referee: Vasily Kazartsev

25 May 2024 30	CSKA Moscow	2 – 0	Ural Yekaterinburg	Moscow
16:30 MSK (UTC+3)	Musayev (yellow card) 14' (goal) 42'; Dávila 40'; Diveyev (yellow card) 66'	Report	Begić (yellow card) 28'; Ítalo (yellow card) 45'; Guilherme (penalty missed) 67'	Stadium: VEB Arena; Attendance: 10,432; Referee: Yan Bobrovsky

=== Russian Cup ===
==== Group stage ====
Pos	Team	Pld	W	PW	PL	L	GF	GA	GD	Pts	Qualification
1	CSKA Moscow	6	2	2	1	1	11	5	+6	11 (Note: Head-to-head points: CSKA 6, Orenburg 0.)	Qualification to the Knockout phase (RPL path)
2	Orenburg	6	3	1	0	2	6	10	−4	11	Qualification to the Knockout phase (RPL path)
3	Sochi	6	2	0	2	2	7	6	+1	8	Qualification to the Knockout phase (regions path)
4	Fakel Voronezh	6	1	1	1	3	4	7	−3	6	

Source: Russian Football Union (in Russian), Soccerway
Rules for classification: 1) Points; 2) Head-to-head points; 3) Head-to-head matches won; 4) Head-to-head goal difference; 5) Head-to-head goals scored; 6) Matches won; 7) Goal difference; 8) Goals scored; 9) Penalty shoot-out goal difference; 10) Draw.
Notes:

26 July 2023 1	Orenburg	0–6	CSKA Moscow	Orenburg
16:15 MSK (UTC+3)	Kenyaykin (red card) 14'; Sivakov (yellow card) 56' (yellow-red card) 62'	Report	Arbuzov 12'; Zaynutdinov 18'; Gajić 22'; Chalov 41'; Lukin (yellow card) 53'; Kislyak (yellow card) 66', (goal) 87'; Ermakov 89'	Stadium: Gazovik Stadium; Attendance: 4,572; Referee: Pavel Kukuyan

9 August 2023 2	CSKA Moscow	0–2	Fakel	Moscow
18:30 MSK (UTC+3)	Willyan (yellow card) 87'; Moisés (yellow card) 90+3'	Report	Ivakhnov 15', 79', (yellow card) 47'; Moțpan (yellow card) 84'; Alshin (yellow card) 90+3'	Stadium: VEB Arena; Attendance: 6,910; Referee: Roman Galimov

30 August 2023 3	Sochi	0–0 (4–5 p)	CSKA Moscow	Sochi
17:15 MSK (UTC+3)		Report	Gajić (yellow card) 50'; Méndez (yellow card) 54'; Nababkin (yellow card) 77'	Stadium: Fisht Olympic Stadium; Attendance: 6,333; Referee: Rafael Shafeev
	Penalties
	Yusupov (penalty scored); Ignatjev (penalty missed); Alves (penalty scored); Batyrev (penalty scored); Kramarič (penalty scored); Yurganov (penalty missed); Medveděv (penalty missed)		Chalov (penalty missed); Zabolotnyi (penalty scored); Kislyak (penalty scored); Nababkin (penalty scored); Oblyakov (penalty scored); Méndez (penalty missed); Gajić (penalty scored)

20 September 2023 4	CSKA Moscow	1–1 (4–2 p)	Sochi	Moscow
15:00 MSK (UTC+3)	Oblyakov 78'	Report	Noboa 43'; Angban (yellow card) 86'	Stadium: VEB Arena; Attendance: 9,390; Referee: Sergey Tsyganok
	Penalties
	Chalov (penalty missed); Zabolotnyi (penalty scored); Davila (penalty scored); Fayzullaev (penalty scored); Oblyakov (penalty missed)		Makarchuk (penalty missed); Miguel (penalty scored); Margasov (penalty scored); Batyrev (penalty missed)

4 October 2023 5	Fakel	1–1 (4–2 p)	CSKA Moscow	Voronezh
14:30 MSK (UTC+3)	Bagamaev (yellow card) 64'; Magal 80'	Report	Gajić 88'	Stadium: Central Stadium of Trade Unions; Attendance: 13,054; Referee: Aleksey Amelin
	Penalties
	Markov (penalty scored); Chele (penalty scored); Mostovoy (penalty scored); Yakimov (penalty scored); Suslov (penalty scored)		Chalov (penalty scored); Fayzullaev (penalty missed); Oblyakov (penalty scored); Zabolotnyi (penalty missed)

2 November 2023 6	CSKA Moscow	3–1	Orenburg	Moscow
18:30 MSK (UTC+3)	Khellven (yellow card) 27'; Chalov 35' (pen.), 74'; Zabolotnyi 42'	Report	Gürlük 37'	Stadium: VEB Arena; Attendance: 10,764; Referee: Ivan Abrosimov

==== Knockout stage ====
29 November 2023 RPL path Quarter-finals 1st leg	Rostov	1–1	CSKA Moscow	Rostov-on-Don
18:15 MSK (UTC+3)	Nababkin 8' (o.g.); Prokhin (yellow card) 14'	Report	Dávila (yellow card) 27'; Zabolotnyi 33'; Moisés (red card) 77'	Stadium: Rostov Arena; Attendance: 11,059; Referee: Kirill Levnikov

12 March 2024 RPL path Quarter-finals 2nd leg	CSKA Moscow	2–0 (3–1 agg.)	Rostov	Moscow
20:15 MSK (UTC+3)	Agapov 63'; Khellven (yellow card) 79'; Musaev 84'	Report	Komarov (yellow card) 90'; Mohebi (yellow card) 90+6'	Stadium: VEB Arena; Attendance: 10,969; Referee: Sergei Karasev

3 April 2024 RPL path Semi-finals 1st leg	Baltika Kaliningrad	0–1	CSKA Moscow	Kaliningrad
18:15 MSK (UTC+3)	Luna (yellow card) 45+1'; Andrade (yellow card) 60'	Report	Dávila 39'	Stadium: Kaliningrad Stadium; Attendance: 14,328; Referee: Sergey Ivanov

16 April 2024 RPL path Semi-finals 2nd leg	CSKA Moscow	2–0 (3–0 agg.)	Baltika Kaliningrad	Moscow
19:30 MSK (UTC+3)	Chalov 34' (pen.); Fayzullaev 36'; Lukin (yellow card) 74'	Report		Stadium: VEB Arena; Attendance: 16,300; Referee: Yan Bobrovsky

2 May 2024 RPL path Final 1st leg	CSKA Moscow	1–1	Zenit St.Petersburg	Moscow
19:15 MSK (UTC+3)	Zabolotnyi 53'	Report	Erokhin 84'	Stadium: VEB Arena; Attendance: 23,158; Referee: Sergei Karasev

15 May 2024 RPL path Final 2nd leg	Zenit St.Petersburg	0–0 (1–1 agg.) (5–4 p)	CSKA Moscow	Saint Petersburg
20:45 MSK (UTC+3)	Vasilyev (yellow card) 12'; Claudinho (yellow card) 87'	Report	Diveyev (yellow card) 83'	Stadium: Krestovsky Stadium; Attendance: 50,115; Referee: Pavel Kukuyan
	Penalties
	Cassierra (penalty scored); Isidor (penalty scored); Mostovoy (penalty scored); Alip (penalty scored); Claudinho (penalty scored)		(penalty scored) Dávila; (penalty scored) Oblyakov; (penalty missed) Zabolotny; (penalty scored) Diveyev; (penalty scored) Musayev

== Squad statistics ==
As of match played 25 May 2024

=== Appearances and goals ===
No.	Pos	Nat	Player	Total		Premier League		Russian Cup		Super Cup	
No.	Pos	Nat	Player	Apps	Goals	Apps	Goals	Apps	Goals	Apps	Goals
2	DF	(Brazil) BRA	Khellven	31	1	21+2	1	4+4	0	0	0
4	DF	(Brazil) BRA	Willyan Rocha	36	2	24	2	11	0	1	0
5	MF	(Serbia) SRB	Saša Zdjelar	37	1	27+1	1	8	0	1	0
6	MF	(Russia) RUS	Maksim Mukhin	16	2	10+2	2	1+2	0	1	0
7	FW	(Chile) CHI	Víctor Dávila	32	6	12+11	5	4+5	1	0	0
9	FW	(Russia) RUS	Fyodor Chalov	41	16	23+6	12	7+4	4	1	0
10	MF	(Russia) RUS	Ivan Oblyakov	39	4	26+2	3	8+3	1	0	0
11	FW	(Russia) RUS	Tamerlan Musayev	16	6	6+5	5	1+4	1	0	0
14	DF	(Russia) RUS	Kirill Nababkin	21	0	9+6	0	2+3	0	0+1	0
17	MF	(Russia) RUS	Kirill Glebov	13	2	3+7	2	1+2	0	0	0
21	MF	(Uzbekistan) UZB	Abbosbek Fayzullaev	32	5	18+4	4	7+3	1	0	0
22	DF	(Serbia) SRB	Milan Gajić	39	5	25+1	3	11+1	2	1	0
27	DF	(Brazil) BRA	Moisés	34	1	24	1	9	0	1	0
31	MF	(Russia) RUS	Matvey Kislyak	9	1	1+2	0	4+2	1	0	0
35	GK	(Russia) RUS	Igor Akinfeev	27	0	25	0	1	0	1	0
47	FW	(Russia) RUS	Renat Golybin	1	0	0+1	0	0	0	0	0
49	GK	(Russia) RUS	Vladislav Torop	16	0	5	0	11	0	0	0
68	DF	(Russia) RUS	Mikhail Ryadno	12	1	1+4	1	4+2	0	0+1	0
77	DF	(Russia) RUS	Ilya Agapov	25	2	11+5	1	7+2	1	0	0
78	DF	(Russia) RUS	Igor Diveyev	15	0	9+1	0	4	0	1	0
86	GK	(Russia) RUS	Vladimir Shaykhutdinov	1	0	0	0	0+1	0	0	0
88	MF	(Chile) CHI	Víctor Méndez	33	1	22+2	1	8	0	1	0
90	DF	(Russia) RUS	Matvey Lukin	11	0	4+1	0	3+3	0	0	0
91	FW	(Russia) RUS	Anton Zabolotny	42	12	17+12	9	7+5	3	1	0
96	DF	(Iran) IRI	Amirhossein Reyvandi	2	0	0+1	0	0+1	0	0	0
Players away from the club on loan:
38	FW	(Argentina) ARG	Adolfo Gaich	7	0	0+4	0	1+1	0	0+1	0
44	DF	(Russia) RUS	Yegor Noskov	2	0	0	0	0+2	0	0	0
72	MF	(Russia) RUS	Nikita Yermakov	10	1	0+5	0	3+1	1	0+1	0
Players who appeared for CSKA Moscow but left during the season:
19	MF	(Kazakhstan) KAZ	Bakhtiyar Zaynutdinov	5	1	3	0	1	1	1	0
20	MF	(Russia) RUS	Konstantin Kuchayev	15	0	4+8	0	2	0	0+1	0
80	MF	(Russia) RUS	Yaroslav Arbuzov	4	1	0+2	0	2	1	0	0

=== Goal scorers ===
Place	Position	Nation	Number	Name	Premier League	Russian Cup	Super Cup	Total
1	FW	(Russia)	9	Fyodor Chalov	12	4	0	16
2	FW	(Russia)	91	Anton Zabolotny	9	3	0	12
3	FW	(Chile)	7	Víctor Dávila	5	1	0	6
3	FW	(Russia)	11	Tamerlan Musayev	5	1	0	6
5	MF	(Uzbekistan)	21	Abbosbek Fayzullaev	4	1	0	5
5	DF	(Serbia)	22	Milan Gajić	3	2	0	5
7	MF	(Russia)	10	Ivan Oblyakov	3	1	0	4
8				Own goal	3	0	0	3
9	MF	(Russia)	6	Maksim Mukhin	2	0	0	2
9	DF	(Brazil)	4	Willyan Rocha	2	0	0	2
9	MF	(Russia)	17	Kirill Glebov	2	0	0	2
9	DF	(Russia)	77	Ilya Agapov	1	1	0	2
13	DF	(Russia)	68	Mikhail Ryadno	1	0	0	1
13	DF	(Brazil)	27	Moisés	1	0	0	1
13	DF	(Brazil)	2	Khellven	1	0	0	1
13	MF	(Chile)	88	Víctor Méndez	1	0	0	1
13	MF	(Serbia)	5	Saša Zdjelar	1	0	0	1
13	MF	(Russia)	31	Matvey Kislyak	0	1	0	1
13	MF	(Russia)	72	Nikita Yermakov	0	1	0	1
13	MF	(Kazakhstan)	19	Bakhtiyar Zaynutdinov	0	1	0	1
13	MF	(Russia)	80	Yaroslav Arbuzov	0	1	0	1
Total					56	18	0	74

=== Clean sheets ===
Place	Position	Nation	Number	Name	Premier League	Russian Cup	Super Cup	Total
1	GK	(Russia)	35	Igor Akinfeev	7	1	1	9
2	GK	(Russia)	49	Vladislav Torop	1	5	0	6
3	GK	(Russia)	86	Vladimir Shaykhutdinov	0	1	0	1
Total					8	6	1	15

Vladislav Torop & Vladimir Shaykhutdinov both played in CSKA Moscow's 0-0 draw against Zenit St.Petersburg on 15 May 2024

=== Disciplinary record ===
Number	Nation	Position	Name	Premier League		Russian Cup		Super Cup		Total	
Number	Nation	Position	Name	Yellow card	Red card	Yellow card	Red card	Yellow card	Red card	Yellow card	Red card
2	(Brazil)	DF	Khellven	0	0	2	0	0	0	2	0
4	(Brazil)	DF	Willyan Rocha	12	2	1	0	0	0	13	2
5	(Serbia)	MF	Saša Zdjelar	6	0	0	0	0	0	6	0
6	(Russia)	MF	Maksim Mukhin	2	0	0	0	0	0	2	0
7	(Chile)	FW	Víctor Dávila	2	0	1	0	0	0	3	0
9	(Russia)	FW	Fyodor Chalov	3	0	0	0	1	0	3	0
10	(Russia)	MF	Ivan Oblyakov	1	0	0	0	0	0	1	0
11	(Russia)	FW	Tamerlan Musayev	2	0	0	0	0	0	2	0
14	(Russia)	DF	Kirill Nababkin	0	0	1	0	0	0	1	0
17	(Russia)	MF	Kirill Glebov	1	0	0	0	0	0	1	0
21	(Uzbekistan)	MF	Abbosbek Fayzullaev	4	0	0	0	0	0	4	0
22	(Serbia)	DF	Milan Gajić	3	1	1	0	0	0	4	1
27	(Brazil)	DF	Moisés	8	0	1	1	0	0	9	1
31	(Russia)	MF	Matvey Kislyak	0	0	1	0	0	0	1	0
49	(Russia)	GK	Vladislav Torop	1	0	0	0	0	0	1	0
77	(Russia)	DF	Ilya Agapov	1	0	0	0	0	0	1	0
78	(Russia)	DF	Igor Diveyev	2	1	0	0	0	0	2	1
88	(Chile)	MF	Víctor Méndez	1	0	1	0	0	0	2	0
90	(Russia)	DF	Matvey Lukin	0	0	2	0	0	0	2	0
91	(Russia)	FW	Anton Zabolotny	5	0	0	0	0	0	5	0
Players away on loan:
38	(Argentina)	FW	Adolfo Gaich	1	0	0	0	0	0	1	0
Players who left CSKA Moscow during the season:
19	(Kazakhstan)	MF	Bakhtiyar Zaynutdinov	1	0	0	0	0	0	1	0
Total				56	4	11	1	1	0	68	5
