= 2012–13 PFC CSKA Moscow season =

PFC CSKA Moscow
2012–13 season
- Chairman: Yevgeni Giner
- Manager: Leonid Slutsky
- Stadium: Luzhniki Stadium & Arena Khimki
- Russian Premier League: 1st
- Russian Cup: Winners
- UEFA Europa League: Play-off round
- Top goalscorer: League: Ahmed Musa (11); All: Ahmed Musa (15)
- Highest home attendance: 67,740 vs Spartak Moscow (21 April 2013)
- Lowest home attendance: 2,193 vs FC Tyumen (31 October 2012)
- Average home league attendance: 11,557 (18 May 2013)
Home colours	Away colours

The 2012–13 CSKA season was the 21st successive season that the club will play in the Russian Premier League, the highest tier of association football in Russia.

== Squad ==
As of match played 3 June 2013

Number	Name	Nationality	Position	Date of birth (age)	Signed from	Signed in	Contract ends	Apps.	Goals
Goalkeepers
1	Sergei Chepchugov	(Russia)	GK	15 July 1985 (aged 27)	Sibir Novosibirsk	2010		20	0
35	Igor Akinfeev (captain)	(Russia)	GK	8 April 1986 (aged 27)	Academy	2003		363	0
38	Vyacheslav Isupov	(Russia)	GK	16 January 1993 (aged 20)	Academy	2010		0	0
41	Vadim Karpov	(Russia)	GK	10 May 1994 (aged 19)	Academy	2012		0	0
45	Ilya Pomazun	(Russia)	GK	16 August 1996 (aged 16)	Academy	2012		0	0
95	Sergei Revyakin	(Russia)	GK	2 April 1995 (aged 18)	Academy	2008		2	0
Defenders
2	Mário Fernandes	(Brazil)	DF	19 September 1990 (aged 22)	Grêmio	2012	2017	33	0
4	Sergei Ignashevich	(Russia)	DF	14 July 1979 (aged 33)	Lokomotiv Moscow	2004		360	32
5	Viktor Vasin	(Russia)	DF	6 October 1988 (aged 24)	Spartak Nalchik	2011		7	0
6	Aleksei Berezutski	(Russia)	DF	20 June 1982 (aged 30)	Chernomorets Novorossiysk	2001		381	8
14	Kirill Nababkin	(Russia)	DF	8 September 1986 (aged 26)	Moscow	2010		91	0
24	Vasili Berezutski	(Russia)	DF	20 June 1982 (aged 30)	Torpedo-ZIL	2002		366	10
39	Vyacheslav Karavayev	(Russia)	DF	20 May 1995 (aged 18)	Academy	2011		0	0
42	Georgi Shchennikov	(Russia)	DF	27 April 1991 (aged 22)	Academy	2008		135	0
44	Andrei Nalyotov	(Russia)	DF	31 March 1995 (aged 18)	Academy	2012		0	0
59	Semyon Fedotov	(Russia)	DF	2 March 1992 (aged 21)	Academy	2009		4	0
60	Layonel Adams	(Russia)	DF	9 August 1994 (aged 18)	Academy	2012		0	0
77	Pavel Drozdov	(Russia)	DF	21 June 1993 (aged 19)	Academy	2011		0	0
90	Anton Polyutkin	(Russia)	DF	2 February 1993 (aged 20)	Academy	2011		0	0
92	Pyotr Ten	(Russia)	DF	12 July 1992 (aged 20)	Academy	2010		1	0
96	Denis Masyutin	(Russia)	DF	9 July 1995 (aged 17)	Academy	2012		0	0
Midfielders
3	Pontus Wernbloom	(Sweden)	MF	25 June 1986 (aged 26)	AZ Alkmaar	2012	2016	45	5
7	Keisuke Honda	(Japan)	MF	13 June 1986 (aged 26)	VVV-Venlo	2010	2013	102	23
10	Alan Dzagoev	(Russia)	MF	17 June 1990 (aged 22)	Krylia Sovetov-SOK Dimitrovgrad	2008		182	44
11	Mark González	(Chile)	MF	10 July 1984 (aged 28)	Real Betis	2009	2014	59	9
15	Dmitry Yefremov	(Russia)	MF	5 February 1994 (aged 19)	Akademiya Tolyatti	2013		4	0
17	Pavel Mamayev	(Russia)	MF	17 September 1988 (aged 24)	Torpedo Moscow	2007		180	7
19	Aleksandrs Cauņa	(Latvia)	MF	19 January 1988 (aged 25)	Skonto Riga	2011	2016	57	5
20	Rasmus Elm	(Sweden)	MF	17 March 1988 (aged 25)	AZ Alkmaar	2012	2015	31	5
21	Zoran Tošić	(Serbia)	MF	28 April 1987 (aged 26)	Manchester United	2010	2015	100	20
25	Elvir Rahimić	(Bosnia and Herzegovina)	MF	4 April 1976 (aged 37)	Anzhi Makhachkala	2001		346	7
36	Yegor Ivanov	(Russia)	MF	19 June 1992 (aged 20)	Academy	2010		0	0
40	Yuri Bavin	(Russia)	MF	5 February 1994 (aged 19)	Academy	2012		0	0
46	Nikolai Dergachyov	(Russia)	MF	24 May 1994 (aged 19)	Saturn-2	2012		0	0
48	Artyom Popov	(Russia)	MF	30 August 1992 (aged 20)	Academy	2010		1	0
51	Maksim Martusevich	(Russia)	MF	7 March 1995 (aged 18)	Academy	2012		0	0
52	Ravil Netfullin	(Russia)	MF	3 March 1993 (aged 20)	Academy	2012		9	0
61	Leonid Rodionov	(Russia)	MF	12 January 1993 (aged 20)	Academy	2010		0	0
70	Armen Ambartsumyan	(Russia)	MF	11 April 1994 (aged 19)	Academy	2010		0	0
80	David Khurtsidze	(Russia)	MF	4 July 1993 (aged 19)	Academy	2011		0	0
93	Gela Zaseyev	(Russia)	MF	20 January 1993 (aged 20)	Academy	2010		0	0
97	Dmitri Litvinov	(Russia)	MF	6 March 1995 (aged 18)	Academy	2012		0	0
Forwards
9	Vágner Love	(Brazil)	FW	11 June 1984 (aged 28)	Palmeiras	2013	2016	255	123
18	Ahmed Musa	(Nigeria)	FW	13 August 1989 (aged 23)	VVV-Venlo	2012	2017	48	16
23	Anton Zabolotny	(Russia)	FW	13 June 1991 (aged 21)	Metallurg Lipetsk	2004		0	0
50	Sergei Seredin	(Russia)	FW	10 April 1994 (aged 19)	Academy	2011		0	0
71	Konstantin Bazelyuk	(Russia)	FW	12 April 1993 (aged 20)	Academy	2010		1	0
88	Seydou Doumbia	(Ivory Coast)	FW	31 December 1987 (aged 25)	Young Boys	2010	2015	82	53
89	Tomáš Necid	(Czech Republic)	FW	13 August 1989 (aged 23)	Slavia Prague	2009		106	31
94	Georgi Bagdasaryan	(Russia)	FW	21 October 1994 (aged 18)	Academy	2012		0	0
Away on loan
	Artur Nigmatullin	(Russia)	GK	17 May 1991 (aged 22)	Luch-Energiya Vladivostok	2008		0	0
	Andrei Semyonov	(Russia)	DF	8 June 1992 (aged 20)	Lokomotiv Moscow	2011		0	0
	Andrei Vasyanovich	(Russia)	DF	13 June 1988 (aged 24)	Moscow	2010		0	0
	Uroš Ćosić	(Serbia)	DF	24 October 1992 (aged 20)	Red Star Belgrade	2009		0	0
	Sekou Oliseh	(Liberia)	MF	5 June 1990 (aged 22)	Midtjylland	2010	2015	78	5
	Evgeni Aldonin	(Russia)	MF	22 January 1980 (aged 33)	Rotor Volgograd	2004		315	13
	Yevgeni Kobzar	(Russia)	MF	9 August 1992 (aged 20)	Academy	2009		0	0
	Aleksandr Stolyarenko	(Russia)	MF	18 January 1991 (aged 22)	Togliatti	2009		0	0
	Aleksandr Vasilyev	(Russia)	MF	23 January 1991 (aged 22)	Academy	2009		1	0
Players that left during the season
29	Kim In-sung	(South Korea)	MF	9 September 1989 (aged 23)	Gangneung City	2012	2013	2	0

== Transfers ==
=== In ===
Date	Position	Nationality	Name	From	Fee	Ref.
4 May 2012	DF	(Brazil)	Mário Fernandes	Grêmio	Undisclosed	
30 July 2012	MF	(Sweden)	Rasmus Elm	AZ	Undisclosed	
1 January 2013	MF	(Russia)	Dmitry Yefremov	Akademiya Tolyatti	Undisclosed	
16 January 2013	FW	(Brazil)	Vágner Love	Flamengo	Undisclosed	

=== Out ===
Date	Position	Nationality	Name	To	Fee	Ref.
6 July 2012	FW	(Niger)	Moussa Maâzou	Étoile du Sahel	Undisclosed	
1 July 2012	DF	(Russia)	Aleksei Nikitin	Yenisey Krasnoyarsk	Undisclosed	
10 July 2012	FW	(Russia)	Serder Serderov	Anzhi Makhachkala	Undisclosed	
13 July 2012	DF	(Lithuania)	Deividas Šemberas	Alania Vladikavkaz	Undisclosed	
1 September 2012	MF	(Russia)	Batraz Khadartsev	Alania Vladikavkaz	Undisclosed	

=== Loans out ===
Date from	Position	Nationality	Name	To	Date to	Ref.
30 June 2012	MF	(Russia)	Yevgeni Kobzar	Khimki	Season Long	
10 July 2012	MF	(Russia)	Aleksandr Vasilyev	Ufa	Season Long	
10 July 2012	MF	(Russia)	Aleksandr Stolyarenko	Sokol Saratov	Season Long	
19 July 2012	DF	(Serbia)	Uroš Ćosić	Pescara	Season Long	
24 July 2012	GK	(Russia)	Artur Nigmatullin	Volga Nizhny Novgorod	Season Long	
24 July 2012	DF	(Russia)	Andrei Semyonov	Lokomotiv-2 Moscow	Season Long	
24 July 2012	MF	(Russia)	Evgeni Aldonin	Mordovia Saransk	Season Long	
31 January 2013	MF	(Liberia)	Sekou Oliseh	PAOK	End of Season	
	DF	(Russia)	Andrei Vasyanovich	Rotor Volgograd	Season Long	

=== Released ===
Date	Position	Nationality	Name	Joined	Date
2 February 2013	MF	(South Korea)	Kim In-sung	Seongnam Ilhwa Chunma	

== Friendlies ==
28 June 2012	CSKA	5–0	Torpedo Moscow	Moscow
13:00	Tošić 34', 58'; Fernandes 53'; Kim In-sung 64', 85'	[ Summary]		Stadium: Luzhniki Stadium

4 July 2012	CSKA	1–1	Torpedo Moscow	Moscow
14:00	Fernandes 60'	[ Summary]	Kozlov 74'	Stadium: Luzhniki Stadium

=== Copa del Sol ===
25 January 2013	CSKA Moscow (Russia)	2–0	(Norway) Rosenborg	La Manga, Spain
19:00 MSK (UTC+4)	Mamayev 19'; Tošić 70'			Stadium: La Manga Stadium; Referee: Kristinn Jakobsson (Iceland)

28 January 2013	CSKA Moscow (Russia)	1–2	(Norway) Strømsgodset	La Manga Stadium, La Manga
19:00 MSK (UTC+4)	Oliseh 90'		Diomande 6'; Wikheim 43'	Referee: Michael Johansen (Denmark)

31 January 2013	Shakhtar Donetsk (Ukraine)	2–0	(Russia) CSKA Moscow	La Manga Stadium, La Manga
19:00 MSK (UTC+4)	Mkhitaryan 47'; Adriano 61'			Referee: Ransin Djurhuus (Faroe Islands)

== Competitions ==
=== Premier League ===
==== Results by round ====
Round	1	2	3	4	5	6	7	8	9	10	11	12	13	14	15	16	17	18	19	20	21	22	23	24	25	26	27	28	29	30
Ground	H	A	H	H	A	H	A	H	A	H	A	H	A	H	A	H	A	A	H	A	H	A	H	A	H	A	H	A	H	A
Result	W	L	L	W	W	W	W	W	W	L	W	W	W	W	W	W	D	L	W	W	W	W	W	D	D	L	W	W	D	L
Position	5	11	14	9	6	4	3	2	1	2	2	2	1	1	1	1	1	2	1	1	1	1	1	1	1	1	1	1	1	1

Updated to match(es) played on 13 May 2013. Source: Russian Premier League
A = Away; H = Home; W = Win; D = Draw; L = Loss

==== Matches ====
21 July 2012 1	CSKA Moscow	1–0	Rostov	Moscow
13:30 MSK (UTC+4)	Doumbia 55'; Wernbloom (yellow card) 68'	Report	Saláta (yellow card) 28'; Sheshukov (yellow card) 44'; Adamov (yellow card) 74'; Kirichenko (yellow card) 90'	Stadium: Arena Khimki; Attendance: 12,000; Referee: Alexander Yegorov

28 July 2012 2	Amkar Perm	3–1	CSKA Moscow	Perm
16:30 MSK (UTC+4)	Burmistrov 7'; Rebko 19', 41'; Gagloyev (yellow card) 45'; Cherenchikov (yellow card) 73'	Report	Honda 13' (penalty missed) 45'; Ignashevich (red card) 61'; Dzagoev (red card) 85'	Stadium: Zvezda Stadium; Attendance: 12,500; Referee: Eduard Malyi

4 August 2012 3	CSKA Moscow	1–3	Zenit St.Petersburg	Moscow
13:30 MSK (UTC+4)	Akinfeev (yellow card) 13'; Wernbloom (yellow card) 41'; Honda 43'	Report	Semak 10', 32'; Kerzhakov 14' (pen.); Denisov (yellow card) 27'	Stadium: Luzhniki Stadium; Attendance: 15,621; Referee: Aleksei Nikolaev

12 August 2012 4	CSKA Moscow	1–0	Anzhi Makhachkala	Moscow
17:00 MSK (UTC+4)	Wernbloom (yellow card) 54'; Tošić 74'	Report	João Carlos (yellow card) 43'; Logashov (yellow card) 50'; Agalarov (yellow card) 55' (yellow-red card) 84'; Gabulov (yellow card) 75'; Eto'o (yellow card) 85'; Shatov (yellow card) 90'	Stadium: Arena Khimki; Attendance: 10,000; Referee: Sergei Karasev

19 August 2012 5	Mordovia Saransk	0–3	CSKA Moscow	Saransk
18:30 MSK (UTC+4)	Rogov (yellow card) 77'	Report	Tošić 30'; Dzagoev 41'; Musa (yellow card) 52'; Cauņa 57'; Elm (yellow card) 83'	Stadium: Start Stadium; Attendance: 12,000; Referee: Sergey Lapochkin

26 August 2012 6	CSKA Moscow	3–0	Krylia Sovetov	Moscow
16:30 MSK (UTC+4)	Cauņa 6' (yellow card) 35'; Tošić 41'; Dzagoev (yellow card) 75'; Musa 86'; Wernbloom (yellow card) 90'	Report	Kornilenko (yellow card) 9'; Tsallagov (yellow card) 76'; Golubev (yellow card) 81'	Stadium: Arena Khimki; Attendance: 11,000; Referee: Eduard Malyi

2 September 2012 7	Krasnodar	0–1	CSKA Moscow	Krasnodar
13:30 MSK (UTC+4)	Smolnikov (yellow card) 28'; Ignatyev (yellow card) 32'; Vranješ (yellow card) 53'; Abreu (yellow card) 70'	Report	Musa 60'; Dzagoev (yellow card) 62'; González (yellow card) 70'	Stadium: Kuban Stadium; Attendance: 13,200; Referee: Mikhail Vilkov

16 September 2012 8	CSKA Moscow	2–0	Alania Vladikavkaz	Moscow
15:00 MSK (UTC+4)	Honda 49', 85'; Fernandes (yellow card) 55'; Wernbloom (yellow card) 89'	Dušan Anđelković	Tsarikayev (yellow card) 31'; Khozin (yellow card) 45'; Šemberas (yellow card) 45+1' (yellow-red card) 90+1'	Stadium: Arena Khimki; Attendance: 10,500; Referee: Vladimir Kazmenko

22 September 2012 9	Volga	2–3	CSKA Moscow	Nizhny Novgorod
13:30 MSK (UTC+4)	Maksimov 21'; Sapogov 44'	Report	Tošić (yellow card) 22'; Dzagoev 57', 69'; Musa 86'; Mamayev (yellow card) 90'	Stadium: Lokomotiv Stadium; Attendance: 13,200; Referee: Vitali Meshkov

30 September 2012 10	CSKA Moscow	0–2	Dynamo Moscow	Moscow
13:30 MSK (UTC+4)	Dzagoev (red card) 58'	Report	Ropotan (yellow card) 29'; Dzsudzsák 38'; Sapeta (yellow card) 42'; Kokorin 51'; Wilkshire (yellow card) 58'	Stadium: Arena Khimki; Attendance: 12,000; Referee: Sergey Karasev

7 October 2012 11	Spartak	0–2	CSKA Moscow	Moscow
18:00 MSK (UTC+4)	Ari (yellow card) 45'; D.Kombarov (yellow card) 72'	Report	Musa 15'; Honda 72'; Ignashevich (yellow card) 78'	Stadium: Luzhniki Stadium; Attendance: 54,228; Referee: Aleksey Eskov

21 October 2012 12	CSKA Moscow	2–0	Rubin Kazan	Moscow
15:15 MSK (UTC+4)	Wernbloom (yellow card) 28'; Elm 69' (pen.); Musa 82'; Cauņa (yellow card) 90'	Report	Kasaev (yellow card) 16'; Orbaiz (yellow card) 33'; Marcano (yellow card) 68' (red card) 72'	Stadium: Luzhniki Stadium; Attendance: 8,764; Referee: Alexander Yegorov

28 October 2012 13	Terek Grozny	1–2	CSKA Moscow	Grozny
16:00 MSK (UTC+4)	Aílton 8'; Adílson (yellow card) 57'; Komorowski (yellow card) 66'	Report	Honda 25'; Tošić (yellow card) 52'; Ignashevich (yellow card) 68'; Wernbloom 88'	Stadium: Sultan Bilimkhanov Stadium; Attendance: 20,800; Referee: Vladislav Bezborodov

4 November 2012 14	CSKA Moscow	2–1	Lokomotiv Moscow	Moscow
13:30 MSK (UTC+4)	Elm 29'; Tošić (yellow card) 56'; Nababkin (yellow card) 69'; Dzagoev (yellow card) 76'; Wernbloom 90+2'	Report	Yeshchenko 33'; Tarasov (yellow card) 42' (yellow-red card) 53'	Stadium: Luzhniki Stadium; Attendance: 11,994; Referee: Timur Arslanbekov

10 November 2012 15	Kuban Krasnodar	1–3	CSKA Moscow	Krasnodar
18:30 MSK (UTC+4)	Özbiliz 44' (pen.); Zelão (yellow card) 67' (yellow-red card) 89'; Bucur (yellow card) 81'; Ionov (yellow card) 89'	Report	Musa 35', 51'; Akinfeev (yellow card) 43'; V.Berezutski (yellow card) 43'; Elm 57'	Stadium: Kuban Stadium; Attendance: 24,680; Referee: Sergey Lapochkin

18 November 2012 16	CSKA Moscow	3–0	Amkar Perm	Moscow
13:30 MSK (UTC+4)	Elm 25' (pen.); Wernbloom (yellow card) 39'; Musa 73'; Cauņa 90+2'	Report	Mijailović (yellow card) 24'; Nijholt (yellow card) 36'; Cherenchikov (yellow card) 67'; Narubin (yellow card) 90'	Stadium: Luzhniki Stadium; Attendance: 6,524; Referee: Maksim Layushkin

26 November 2012 17	Zenit St.Petersburg	1–1	CSKA Moscow	Saint Petersburg
20:00 MSK (UTC+4)	Yanbaev 56'; Hubočan (yellow card) 84'	Report	Dzagoev (yellow card) 27'; Musa (yellow card) 54'; Elm 85' (pen.); Fernandes (yellow card) 88'; Wernbloom (yellow card) 89'	Stadium: Petrovsky Stadium; Attendance: 0 Referee: Alexander Yegorov
Note: Game played behind closed doors due to Zenit's game against Dynamo Moscow being abandoned on 17 November 2012.

2 December 2012 18	Anzhi Makhachkala	2–0	CSKA Moscow	Makhachkala
13:30 MSK (UTC+4)	Shatov (yellow card) 41'; Zhirkov (yellow card) 45'; Traoré 57'; Boussoufa 78'	Report	Cauņa (yellow card) 19' (yellow-red card) 45+1'; Nababkin (yellow card) 43'	Stadium: Dynamo Stadium; Attendance: 15,500; Referee: Vladislav Bezborodov

9 December 2012 19	CSKA Moscow	2–1	Mordovia Saransk	Moscow
16:00 MSK (UTC+4)	Honda 14'; Mamayev 71' (yellow card) 71'; Elm (yellow card) 84'	Report	Osipov (yellow card) 41'; Bobyor 54'; Kuleshov (yellow card) 66'	Stadium: Luzhniki Stadium; Attendance: 5,801; Referee: Aleksei Nikolaev

9 March 2013 20	Krylia Sovetov	0–2	CSKA Moscow	Samara
16:00 MSK (UTC+4)	Drahun (yellow card) 27'; Amisulashvili (yellow card) 51'; Angbwa (yellow card) 89'	Report	Wernbloom 38'; Musa 72'	Stadium: Metallurg Stadium; Attendance: 22,000; Referee: Vladimir Kazmenko

17 March 2013 21	CSKA Moscow	1–0	Krasnodar	Moscow
13:30 MSK (UTC+4)	Dzagoev 17'; Akinfeev (yellow card) 55'; Wernbloom (yellow card) 65'	Report	Pereyra (yellow card) 55'; Tubić (yellow card) 59'; Anđelković (yellow card) 75'	Stadium: Luzhniki Stadium; Attendance: 10,514; Referee: Aleksei Eskov

1 April 2013 22	Alania Vladikavkaz	0–4	CSKA Moscow	Vladikavkaz
19:00 MSK (UTC+4)	Welinton (red card) 54'; Rudnei (yellow card) 58'; Drenthe (yellow card) 61'; Vranješ (yellow card) 69'	Report	Dzagoev 25'; V.Berezutski (yellow card) 43'; Vágner Love 52', 70' (pen.); Doumbia 90+2'	Stadium: Republican Spartak Stadium; Attendance: 20,500; Referee: Alexander Yegorov

6 April 2013 23	CSKA Moscow	2–0	Volga Nizhny Novgorod	Moscow
14:00 MSK (UTC+4)	Dzagoev 30'; Vágner Love 35' (yellow card) 89' (yellow-red card) 90+4'	Report	Bulgaru (yellow card) 51'; Zaytsev (yellow card) 63'; Sapogov (yellow card) 89'	Stadium: Luzhniki Stadium; Attendance: 7,857; Referee: Vladimir Kazmenko

12 April 2013 24	Dynamo Moscow	0–0	CSKA Moscow	Moscow
20:00 MSK (UTC+4)	Yusupov (yellow card) 47'; Noboa (yellow card) 90'	Report	Musa (yellow card) 65'	Stadium: Arena Khimki; Attendance: 16,284; Referee: Aleksei Nikolaev

21 April 2013 25	CSKA Moscow	2–2	Spartak Moscow	Moscow
13:30 MSK (UTC+4)	Ignashevich (yellow card) 42'; Vágner Love (penalty missed) 50'; Musa 73'; Wernbloom (yellow card) 84'; Dzagoev 90+4' (pen.)	Report	Vukojević (yellow card) 16'; McGeady 42' (yellow card) 48'; Ari 46'; Waris (yellow card) 82'; Bocchetti (yellow card) 86'; Dykan (yellow card) 90'; Suchý (yellow card) 90'; Rafael Carioca (yellow card) 90+2' (yellow-red card) 90+4'	Stadium: Luzhniki Stadium; Attendance: 67,740; Referee: Sergei Karasev

28 April 2013 26	Rubin Kazan	2–0	CSKA Moscow	Kazan
18:30 MSK (UTC+4)	Rondón 49'; Eremenko 81'; Kuzmin (yellow card) 89'	Report	Elm (yellow card) 41'	Stadium: Central Stadium; Attendance: 15,710; Referee: Vitali Meshkov

4 May 2013 27	CSKA Moscow	1–0	Terek Grozny	Moscow
13:30 MSK (UTC+4)	Wernbloom 31'	Report	Lebedenko (yellow card) 31'	Stadium: Arena Khimki; Attendance: 8,150; Referee: Aleksei Eskov

12 May 2013 28	Lokomotiv Moscow	1–4	CSKA Moscow	Moscow
13:30 MSK (UTC+4)	Tarasov 55' (yellow card) 69'	Report	Love 6', 43'; Musa 26'; Doumbia 74'	Stadium: Lokomotiv Stadium; Attendance: 24,846; Referee: Aleksei Nikolaev

18 May 2013 29	CSKA Moscow	0–0	Kuban	Moscow
13:30 MSK (UTC+4)		Report	Kozlov (yellow card) 79'	Stadium: Arena Khimki; Attendance: 17,500; Referee: Sergei Karasev

26 May 2013 30	Rostov	3–0	CSKA Moscow	Rostov
13:30 MSK (UTC+4)	Poloz 18'; Kanga 44'; Kalachev 55' (yellow card) 56'; Gațcan (yellow card) 71'; Kisenkov (yellow card) 81'	Report	Wernbloom (yellow card) 34'	Stadium: Olimp-2; Attendance: 14,500; Referee: Sergey Lapochkin

==== Table ====
Pos	Team	Pld	W	D	L	GF	GA	GD	Pts	Qualification or relegation
1	CSKA Moscow (C)	30	20	4	6	49	25	+24	64	Qualification for the Champions League group stage
2	Zenit St. Petersburg	30	18	8	4	53	25	+28	62	Qualification for the Champions League third qualifying round
3	Anzhi Makhachkala	30	15	8	7	45	34	+11	53	Qualification for the Europa League group stage
4	Spartak Moscow	30	15	6	9	51	39	+12	51	Qualification to Europa League play-off round
5	Kuban Krasnodar	30	14	9	7	48	28	+20	51	Qualification for the Europa League third qualifying round

Source: Russian Premier League
Rules for classification: 1) points; 2) number of wins; 3) head-to-head points; 4) number of head-to-head wins; 5) head-to-head goal difference; 6) number of head-to-head goals scored; 7) number of head-to-head away goals scored; 8) goal difference; 9) number of goals scored; 10) number of away goals scored; 11) position in the 2011–12 season (only used until all the regularly scheduled games have been played); 11) extra play-off game or tournament between the teams in question.
(C) Champions

=== Russian Cup ===
26 September 2012 Round of 32	Tom Tomsk	0–1	CSKA Moscow	Tomsk
16:30 MSK (UTC+3)	Gorbanets (yellow card) 18'; Cherevko (yellow card) 34'; Sabitov (yellow card) 43'; Nikolov (yellow card) 54'; Aravin (yellow card) 79'	Report	Cauņa 42'; Shchennikov (yellow card) 52'	Stadium: Trud Stadium; Attendance: 9,000; Referee: Sergey Kuznetsov

31 October 2012 Round of 16	CSKA Moscow	3–0	Tyumen	Moscow
16:30 MSK (UTC+3)	Honda 33'; Mamayev 69'; Musa 84'	Report	Morozov (yellow card) 27'; Dutov (yellow card) 45' (yellow-red card) 57'	Stadium: Luzhniki Stadium; Attendance: 2,193; Referee: Sergey Kostevich

17 April 2013 Quarterfinal	CSKA Moscow	3–0	Yenisey Krasnoyarsk	Moscow
19:00 MSK (UTC+3)	Vágner Love 12'; Musa 65'; Mamayev 82'	Report		Stadium: Luzhniki Stadium; Attendance: 3,491; Referee: Mikhail Vilkov

7 May 2013 Semifinal	Rostov	0–2 (a.e.t.)	CSKA Moscow	Rostov-on-Don
18:00 MSK (UTC+3)	Česnauskis (yellow card) 7'; Kisenkov (yellow card) 51'; Lazović (red card) 81'; Kalachev (yellow card) 120+1'; Dyakov (yellow card) 120+1'; Holenda (yellow card) 120+1'	Report	Elm (yellow card) 20'; Wernbloom (yellow card) 27'; Ignashevich (red card) 81'; Doumbia 105'; Musa 120+1'	Stadium: Olimp – 2 Attendance: 14,500; Referee: Vladislav Bezborodov

1 June 2013 Final	CSKA Moscow	1–1 (a.e.t.) (4–3 p)	Anzhi Makhachkala	Grozny
13:30 MSK (UTC+3)	Musa 11'; Wernbloom (red card) 87'	Report	Diarra 74' (yellow card) 77'; Boussoufa (yellow card) 81'; Zhirkov (yellow card) 90'	Stadium: Terek Stadium; Attendance: 28,000; Referee: Alexander Yegorov
	Penalties
	Mamayev (penalty scored); V. Berezutski (penalty scored); Musa (penalty missed); Vágner Love (penalty scored); Doumbia (penalty scored)		(penalty scored) Boussoufa; (penalty missed) Zhirkov; (penalty scored) Willian; (penalty missed) Jucilei; (penalty scored) Eto'o

=== Europa League ===
==== Qualifying phase ====
23 August 2012 Playoff Round 1st Leg	AIK (Sweden)	0–1	(Russia) CSKA Moscow	Stockholm, Sweden
21:00 MSK (UTC+3)	Lorentzson (yellow card) 74'	Report	Honda 61'	Stadium: Råsunda Stadium; Attendance: 16,889; Referee: Kevin Blom (Netherlands)

30 August 2012 Playoff Round 2nd Leg	CSKA Moscow (Russia)	0–2 (1–2 agg.)	(Sweden) AIK	Moscow, Russia
21:00 MSK (UTC+3)		Report	Karikari 7' (yellow card) 39'; Kayongo-Mutumba (yellow card) 27'; Backman (yellow card) 90'; Lorentzson 90+3'	Stadium: Arena Khimki; Attendance: 11,000; Referee: Ovidiu Alin Hategan (Romania)

== Squad statistics ==
As of 3 June 2013

=== Appearances and goals ===
No.	Pos	Nat	Player	Total		Premier League		Russian Cup		Europa League	
No.	Pos	Nat	Player	Apps	Goals	Apps	Goals	Apps	Goals	Apps	Goals
1	GK	(Russia) RUS	Sergei Chepchugov	4	0	1	0	3	0	0	0
2	DF	(Brazil) BRA	Mário Fernandes	33	0	27+1	0	3	0	2	0
3	MF	(Sweden) SWE	Pontus Wernbloom	32	4	23+3	4	3+1	0	0+2	0
4	DF	(Russia) RUS	Sergei Ignashevich	33	0	28	0	3	0	2	0
5	DF	(Russia) RUS	Viktor Vasin	3	0	0	0	1+2	0	0	0
6	DF	(Russia) RUS	Aleksei Berezutski	10	0	3+2	0	5	0	0	0
7	MF	(Japan) JPN	Keisuke Honda	28	9	21+2	7	2+1	1	2	1
9	FW	(Brazil) BRA	Vágner Love	12	6	9	5	3	1	0	0
10	MF	(Russia) RUS	Alan Dzagoev	30	7	24	7	4	0	2	0
11	MF	(Chile) CHI	Mark González	12	0	1+9	0	0	0	0+2	0
14	DF	(Russia) RUS	Kirill Nababkin	26	0	17+2	0	5	0	1+1	0
15	FW	(Russia) RUS	Dmitri Yefremov	4	0	0+3	0	1	0	0	0
17	MF	(Russia) RUS	Pavel Mamayev	23	2	4+15	1	3+1	1	0	0
18	FW	(Nigeria) NGR	Ahmed Musa	35	15	26+2	11	5	4	2	0
19	MF	(Latvia) LAT	Aleksandrs Cauņa	31	4	19+6	3	3+1	1	2	0
20	MF	(Sweden) SWE	Rasmus Elm	31	5	26	5	3	0	2	0
21	MF	(Serbia) SRB	Zoran Tošić	27	4	22+3	3+1	0	0	2	0
24	DF	(Russia) RUS	Vasili Berezutski	32	0	29	0	1	0	2	0
25	MF	(Bosnia and Herzegovina) BIH	Elvir Rahimić	1	0	0	0	0+1	0	0	0
35	GK	(Russia) RUS	Igor Akinfeev	33	0	29	0	2	0	2	0
42	DF	(Russia) RUS	Georgi Schennikov	22	0	16+2	0	2+1	0	1	0
52	MF	(Russia) RUS	Ravil Netfullin	9	0	1+6	0	2	0	0	0
71	FW	(Russia) RUS	Konstantin Bazelyuk	1	0	0+0	0	0+1	0	0	0
88	FW	(Ivory Coast) CIV	Seydou Doumbia	9	4	4+3	3	0+2	1	0	0
89	FW	(Czech Republic) CZE	Tomáš Necid	1	0	0+1	0	0+0	0	0	0
92	DF	(Russia) RUS	Pyotr Ten	1	0	0+1	0	0+0	0	0	0
Players away from the club on loan:
26	MF	(Liberia) LBR	Sekou Oliseh	12	0	0+10	0	1+1	0	0	0
Players who appeared for CSKA no longer at the club:
29	MF	(South Korea) KOR	Kim In-sung	1	0	0	0	0+1	0	0	0

=== Goal scorers ===
Place	Position	Nation	Number	Name	Premier League	Russian Cup	Europa League	Total
1	FW	(Nigeria)	18	Ahmed Musa	11	4	0	15
2	MF	(Japan)	7	Keisuke Honda	7	1	1	9
3	MF	(Russia)	10	Alan Dzagoev	7	0	0	7
4	FW	(Brazil)	9	Vágner Love	5	1	0	6
5	MF	(Sweden)	20	Rasmus Elm	5	0	0	5
6	MF	(Sweden)	3	Pontus Wernbloom	4	0	0	4
6	MF	(Latvia)	19	Aleksandrs Cauņa	3	1	0	4
6	FW	(Ivory Coast)	88	Seydou Doumbia	3	1	0	4
9	MF	(Serbia)	21	Zoran Tošić	3	0	0	3
9	MF	(Russia)	17	Pavel Mamayev	1	2	0	3
				TOTALS	49	10	1	60

=== Disciplinary record ===
Number	Nation	Position	Name	Premier League		Russian Cup		Europa League		Total	
Number	Nation	Position	Name	Yellow card	Red card	Yellow card	Red card	Yellow card	Red card	Yellow card	Red card
3	(Sweden)	MF	Pontus Wernbloom	11	0	1	1	0	0	12	1
4	(Russia)	MF	Sergei Ignashevich	3	1	0	1	0	0	3	2
9	(Brazil)	FW	Vágner Love	2	1	0	0	0	0	2	1
10	(Russia)	MF	Alan Dzagoev	4	2	0	0	0	0	4	2
11	(Chile)	MF	Mark González	1	0	0	0	0	0	1	0
13	(Brazil)	DF	Mário Fernandes	2	0	0	0	0	0	2	0
14	(Russia)	DF	Kirill Nababkin	2	0	0	0	0	0	2	0
17	(Russia)	MF	Pavel Mamayev	3	0	0	0	0	0	3	0
18	(Nigeria)	FW	Ahmed Musa	3	0	0	0	0	0	3	0
19	(Latvia)	MF	Aleksandrs Cauņa	4	1	0	0	0	0	4	1
20	(Sweden)	MF	Rasmus Elm	3	0	1	0	0	0	4	0
21	(Serbia)	MF	Zoran Tošić	3	0	0	0	0	0	3	0
24	(Russia)	DF	Vasili Berezutski	2	0	0	0	0	0	2	0
35	(Russia)	GK	Igor Akinfeev	3	0	0	0	0	0	3	0
42	(Russia)	DF	Georgi Schennikov	0	0	1	0	0	0	1	0
			TOTALS	46	4	3	2	0	0	49	6
