= Yaroslav Arbuzov =

Russian footballer (born 2004)

Personal information
- Full name: Yaroslav Igorevich Arbuzov
- Date of birth: 12 January 2004 (age 22)
- Place of birth: Luhansk, Ukraine
- Height: 1.76 m (5 ft 9 in)
- Positions: Right midfielder; left midfielder

Team information
- Current team: Shinnik Yaroslavl (on loan from Baltika Kaliningrad)
- Number: 19

Youth career
- Zorya Luhansk
- 2019–2023: CSKA Moscow

Senior career*
Years	Team	Apps	(Gls)
2023–2024	CSKA Moscow	2	(0)
2024–	Baltika Kaliningrad	0	(0)
2024–	→ Baltika-BFU Kaliningrad	9	(3)
2024–2025	→ Chayka Peschanokopskoye (loan)	18	(0)
2025–2026	→ Rotor Volgograd (loan)	18	(3)
2026–	→ Shinnik Yaroslavl (loan)	0	(0)

International career^{‡}
2023	Russia U19	2	(1)
- * Club domestic league appearances and goals as of 16 May 2026 ‡ National team caps and goals as of 31 May 2023

Yaroslav Igorevich Arbuzov (Russian: Ярослав Игоревич Арбузов; born 12 January 2004) is a Russian football player who plays as a right midfielder or left midfielder for Shinnik Yaroslavl on loan from Baltika Kaliningrad.

== Career ==
He made his debut in the Russian Premier League for CSKA Moscow on 22 July 2023 in a game against Ural Yekaterinburg.

On 13 January 2024, Arbuzov signed a 4.5-year contract with Baltika Kaliningrad.

== Career statistics ==
As of match played 24 May 2025

Appearances and goals by club, season and competition
Club	Season	League			Cup		Continental		Other		Total	
Club	Season	Division	Apps	Goals	Apps	Goals	Apps	Goals	Apps	Goals	Apps	Goals
CSKA Moscow	2023–24	Russian Premier League	2	0	2	1	—		0	0	4	1
Baltika Kaliningrad	2023–24	Russian Premier League	0	0	0	0	—		—		0	0
Baltika Kaliningrad	2024–25	Russian First League	0	0	0	0	–		–		0	0
Baltika Kaliningrad	Total		0	0	0	0	0	0	0	0	0	0
Baltika-BFU Kaliningrad	2024	Russian Second League B	9	3	—		—		—		9	3
Chayka Peschanokopskoye (loan)	2024–25	Russian First League	18	0	3	0	–		–		21	0
Career total			29	3	5	1	0	0	0	0	34	4
