= Vladimir Shaykhutdinov =

Russian footballer (born 2004)

Personal information
- Full name: Vladimir Yuryevich Shaykhutdinov
- Date of birth: 4 June 2004 (age 22)
- Height: 1.92 m (6 ft 4 in)
- Position: Goalkeeper

Team information
- Current team: Mashuk-KMV
- Number: 86

Youth career
- 2020–2024: CSKA Moscow

Senior career*
| Years | Team | Apps | (Gls) |
| 2023–2025 | CSKA Moscow | 0 | (0) |
| 2024–2025 | → Volga Ulyanovsk (loan) | 17 | (0) |
| 2025–2026 | Volga Ulyanovsk | 9 | (0) |
| 2026– | Mashuk-KMV | 10 | (0) |
- * Club domestic league appearances and goals as of 15 November 2026

Vladimir Yuryevich Shaykhutdinov (Russian: Владимир Юрьевич Шайхутдинов; born 4 June 2004) is a Russian football player who plays as a goalkeeper for Mashuk-KMV.

== Career ==
Shaykhutdinov made his debut for CSKA Moscow on 15 May 2024 in the return leg of the 2023–24 Russian Cup RPL path final against Zenit St. Petersburg. He came on as a first half substitute after starting goalkeeper Vladislav Torop had to be taken off the field due to head-to-head collision. Shaykhutdinov kept the clean sheet in a 0–0 draw, CSKA lost in a penalty shoot-out.

On 22 June 2024, Shaykhutdinov moved on a season-long loan to Volga Ulyanovsk.

On 28 June 2025, Shaykhutdinov returned to Volga on a permanent basis.

== Career statistics ==
As of match played 14 June 2025

Appearances and goals by club, season and competition
| Club | Season | League | | | Cup | | Other | | Total | |
| Club | Season | Division | Apps | Goals | Apps | Goals | Apps | Goals | Apps | Goals |
|---|---|---|---|---|---|---|---|---|---|---|
| CSKA Moscow | 2023–24 | Russian Premier League | 0 | 0 | 1 | 0 | 0 | 0 | 1 | 0 |
| Volga Ulyanovsk (loan) | 2024–25 | Russian Second League A | 17 | 0 | 1 | 0 | – | | 18 | 0 |
| Career total | | | 17 | 0 | 2 | 0 | 0 | 0 | 19 | 0 |
