= Ilya Agapov =

Russian footballer (born 2001)

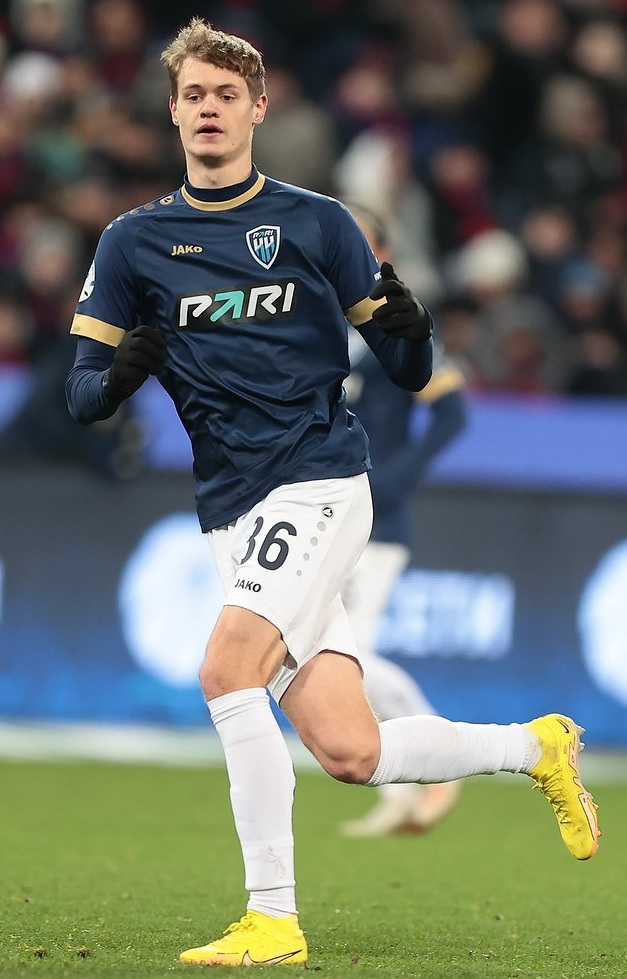
- Agapov with Pari NN in 2022

Personal information
- Full name: Ilya Nikolayevich Agapov
- Date of birth: 21 January 2001 (age 25)
- Place of birth: Kazan, Russia
- Height: 1.92 m (6 ft 4 in)
- Position: Centre-back

Team information
- Current team: Ufa
- Number: 14

Youth career
- 2007–2008: Motor Kazan
- 2008–2019: Rubin Kazan

Senior career*
Years	Team	Apps	(Gls)
2019–2021	Rubin Kazan	0	(0)
2020	→ Neftekhimik Nizhnekamsk (loan)	2	(0)
2020–2021	→ Neftekhimik Nizhnekamsk (loan)	22	(1)
2021–2022	Spartak-2 Moscow	16	(1)
2022–2023	Pari NN	13	(0)
2023–2026	CSKA Moscow	18	(1)
2025	→ Pari NN (loan)	6	(0)
2025	→ Akron Tolyatti (loan)	1	(0)
2026	→ Ufa (loan)	10	(0)
2026–	Ufa	0	(0)

International career^{‡}
2018–2019	Russia U18	14	(0)
2019	Russia U19	6	(1)
2021	Russia U21	2	(0)
- * Club domestic league appearances and goals as of 16 May 2026 ‡ National team caps and goals as of 6 June 2021

Ilya Nikolayevich Agapov (Russian: Илья Николаевич Агапов; born 21 January 2001) is a Russian football player who plays as a centre-back for Ufa.

== Club career ==
He made his debut in the Russian Football National League for FC Neftekhimik Nizhnekamsk on 9 March 2020 in a game against FC Rotor Volgograd. He started the game and played the full match.

On 2 June 2021, he signed a contract with FC Spartak Moscow until 31 May 2022 and was assigned to FC Spartak-2 Moscow.

On 13 July 2022, Agapov signed with FC Pari Nizhny Novgorod. He made his Russian Premier League debut for Pari NN on 7 August 2022 against PFC Sochi.

On 6 January 2023, Agapov signed a contract with CSKA Moscow until 2027. On 16 January 2025, Agapov returned to Pari NN on loan. On 9 September 2025, he moved on a new loan to Akron Tolyatti, with an option to buy. On 19 December 2025, Akron terminated the loan early. On 10 February 2026, Agapov moved on a new loan to Ufa.

On 3 July 2026, Agapov returned to Ufa on a permanent basis.

== International career ==
Agapov was called up to the Russia national football team for the first time in November 2022 for friendly games against Tajikistan and Uzbekistan.

== Career statistics ==
As of match played 21 October 2025

Appearances and goals by club, season and competition
Club	Season	League			Cup		Continental		Total	
Club	Season	Division	Apps	Goals	Apps	Goals	Apps	Goals	Apps	Goals
Rubin Kazan	2018–19	Russian Premier League	0	0	0	0	—		0	0
Rubin Kazan	2019–20	Russian Premier League	0	0	0	0	—		0	0
Rubin Kazan	Total		0	0	0	0	0	0	0	0
Neftekhimik Nizhnekamsk (loan)	2019–20	Russian First League	2	0	—		—		2	0
Neftekhimik Nizhnekamsk (loan)	2020–21	Russian First League	22	1	1	0	—		23	1
Spartak-2 Moscow	2021–22	Russian First League	16	1	—		—		16	1
Pari NN	2022–23	Russian Premier League	13	0	3	0	—		16	0
CSKA Moscow	2022–23	Russian Premier League	2	0	1	0	—		3	0
CSKA Moscow	2023–24	Russian Premier League	16	1	9	1	—		25	2
CSKA Moscow	2024–25	Russian Premier League	0	0	5	0	—		5	0
CSKA Moscow	Total		18	1	15	1	—		33	2
Pari NN (loan)	2024–25	Russian Premier League	6	0	—		—		6	0
Akron Tolyatti (loan)	2025–26	Russian Premier League	1	0	3	0	—		4	0
Career total			78	3	22	1	0	0	100	4

== Honours ==
CSKA Moscow

- Russian Cup: 2022–23, 2024–25
