= Mikhail Ryadno =

Russian football player (born 2005)

Personal information
- Full name: Mikhail Igorevich Ryadno
- Date of birth: 18 September 2005 (age 21)
- Place of birth: Moscow, Russia
- Height: 1.82 m (6 ft 0 in)
- Position: Left-back

Team information
- Current team: Baltika Kaliningrad
- Number: 68

Youth career
- –2016: SSh-75 Savyolovskaya Moscow
- 2016–2019: Dynamo Moscow
- 2019–2024: CSKA Moscow

Senior career*
Years	Team	Apps	(Gls)
2023–2026	CSKA Moscow	5	(1)
2024–2025	→ Rodina Moscow (loan)	27	(0)
2026–	Baltika Kaliningrad	17	(1)

International career^{‡}
2023–	Russia U21	18	(1)
- * Club domestic league appearances and goals as of 21 November 2026 ‡ National team caps and goals as of 18 November 2025

Mikhail Igorevich Ryadno (Russian: Михаил Игоревич Рядно; born 18 September 2005) is a Russian football player who plays as a left-back for Baltika Kaliningrad.

== Career ==
Ryadno made his debut for CSKA Moscow on 15 July 2023 in the 2023 Russian Super Cup against Zenit St. Petersburg. He made his Russian Premier League debut a week later against Ural Yekaterinburg.

On 25 July 2024, Ryadno moved on loan to Rodina Moscow until the end of 2024, with an option to extend the loan until the end of the 2024–25 season. On 25 December 2024, Rodina announced that the loan expired. On 20 February 2025, the clubs agreed on a new loan until the end of the 2024–25 season.

On 16 February 2026, Ryadno signed a contract with Baltika Kaliningrad until 31 December 2029.

== Career statistics ==
As of match played 21 November 2026

Appearances and goals by club, season and competition
Club	Season	League			Cup		Other		Total	
Club	Season	Division	Apps	Goals	Apps	Goals	Apps	Goals	Apps	Goals
CSKA Moscow	2023–24	Russian Premier League	5	1	6	0	1 (Note: Appearance in Russian Super Cup)	0	12	1
CSKA Moscow	2025–26	Russian Premier League	0	0	1	0	—		1	0
CSKA Moscow	Total		5	1	7	0	1	0	13	1
Rodina Moscow (loan)	2024–25	Russian First League	27	0	0	0	—		27	0
Baltika Kaliningrad	2025–26	Russian Premier League	10	1	1	0	—		11	1
Baltika Kaliningrad	2026–27	Russian Premier League	7	0	5	0	—		12	0
Baltika Kaliningrad	Total		17	1	6	0	0	0	23	1
Career total			49	2	13	0	1	0	63	2
