= Amirhossein Reyvandi =

Iranian footballer (born 2004)

Personal information
- Date of birth: 8 March 2004 (age 22)
- Place of birth: Tehran, Iran
- Height: 1.72 m (5 ft 8 in)
- Positions: Left-back; left midfielder

Youth career
- KIA

Senior career*
Years	Team	Apps	(Gls)
2023–2024	KIA	7	(0)
2024	→ CSKA Moscow (loan)	1	(0)
2024–2026	CSKA Moscow	0	(0)
2024	→ Bukhara (loan)	9	(0)
2025–2026	→ Jarun Zagreb (loan)	22	(0)
- * Club domestic league appearances and goals as of 23 June 2026

Amirhossein Reyvandi (Persian: امیرحسین ریوندی; born 8 March 2004) is an Iranian football player who plays as a left-back or left midfielder.

== Club career ==
On 22 February 2024, Reyvandi joined Russian Premier League club CSKA Moscow on loan until the end of the 2023–24 season, with an option to buy.

He made his debut for CSKA on 15 May 2024 in a 2023–24 Russian Cup RPL path final return leg against Zenit St. Petersburg. He made his league debut for CSKA on 20 May 2024 against Pari Nizhny Novgorod.

On 30 July 2024, CSKA announced that they had signed Reyvandi from KIA Football Academy on a contract until the summer of 2026, whilst also loaning him out to Bukhara in the Uzbekistan Pro League until the end of 2024. On 21 February 2025, Reyvandi moved on a new loan to Jarun Zagreb in Croatia.

== Career statistics ==
As of match played 25 May 2024

Appearances and goals by club, season and competition
Club	Season	League			Cup		Continental		Other		Total	
Club	Season	Division	Apps	Goals	Apps	Goals	Apps	Goals	Apps	Goals	Apps	Goals
KIA	2023–24	League 2	7	0	2	0	—		—		9	0
CSKA Moscow (loan)	2023–24	Russian Premier League	1	0	1	0	—		—		2	0
Career total			8	0	3	0	0	0	0	0	11	0
