= Kirill Nababkin =

Russian footballer

Kirill Nababkin Кирилл Набабкин
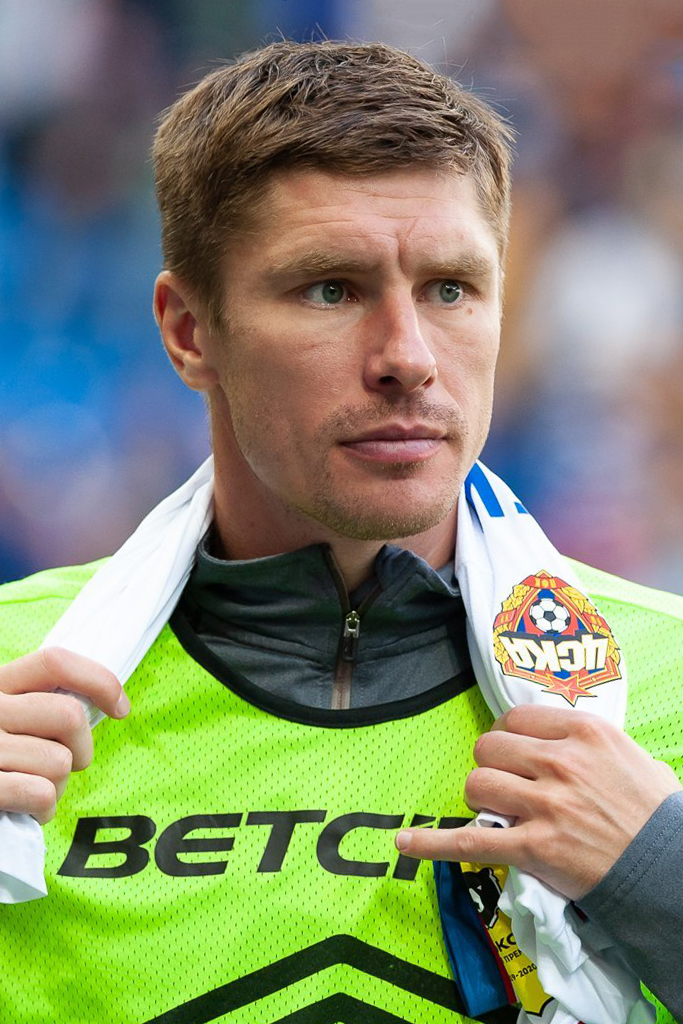
- Nababkin with CSKA Moscow in 2020

Personal information
- Full name: Kirill Anatolyevich Nababkin
- Date of birth: 8 September 1986 (age 40)
- Place of birth: Moscow, Soviet Union
- Height: 1.83 m (6 ft 0 in)
- Position: Centre-back

Team information
- Current team: CSKA Moscow (U19 assistant coach)

Youth career
- 1993–2002: Spartak Moscow
- 2002–2003: Neftyanik-Kapotnya Moscow
- 2003–2004: Moscow

Senior career*
Years	Team	Apps	(Gls)
2004–2009	Moscow	64	(0)
2009–2024	CSKA Moscow	237	(4)
2024–2026	SKA Rostov-on-Don		

International career
2005–2008	Russia U-21	10	(1)
2011	Russia-2	1	(0)
2012–2019	Russia	5	(0)

Managerial career
- 2026–: CSKA Moscow (U19 assistant)
- * Club domestic league appearances and goals

Kirill Anatolyevich Nababkin (Russian: Кирилл Анатольевич Набабкин; born 8 September 1986) is a Russian football coach and a former player who is an assistant coach with the Under-19 squad of CSKA Moscow. He mostly played at centre-back position, but also played as a left-back or right-back.

== Career ==
Nabakin began his youth career with Moscow. In December 2009 he left the club and signed with the local rival CSKA Moscow. He joined the new club for free.

On 7 August 2020, Nababkin signed a new one-year contract with CSKA Moscow. On 19 July 2021, Nababkin signed another one-year contract with CSKA Moscow. On 20 May 2022, Nababkin extended his contract for the 2022–23 season. On 17 June 2023, he extended his contract for the 2023–24 season. On 21 May 2024, CSKA announced that Nababkin would leave the club at the end of the season.

== International ==
On 25 May 2012, he was called up to the Russia national football team for the first time, being named into their UEFA Euro 2012 squad, replacing ailing Roman Shishkin. He made his national team debut on 1 June 2012 in a friendly against Italy. After a 4-year break, he was called up to the national team again in November 2018 for games against Germany and Sweden.

== Career statistics ==
=== Club ===
As of match played 25 May 2024

Appearances and goals by club, season and competition
Club	Season	League			National Cup		Continental		Other		Total	
Club	Season	Division	Apps	Goals	Apps	Goals	Apps	Goals	Apps	Goals	Apps	Goals
Moscow	2005	Russian Premier League	7	0	2	0	-		-		9	0
Moscow	2006	Russian Premier League	6	0	2	0	-		-		8	0
Moscow	2007	Russian Premier League	8	0	4	0	-		-		12	0
Moscow	2008	Russian Premier League	15	0	1	0	4	0	-		20	0
Moscow	2009	Russian Premier League	28	0	4	0	-		-		32	0
Moscow	Total		64	0	13	0	4	0	-	-	81	0
CSKA Moscow	2010	Russian Premier League	13	0	0	0	4 (Note: Zero appearances in the UEFA Champions League, and four appearances in the UEFA Europa League)	0	0 (Note: Appearance in the Russian Super Cup)	0	17	0
CSKA Moscow	2011–12	Russian Premier League	34	0	4	0	9 (Note: Five appearances in the UEFA Champions League, and four appearances in the UEFA Europa League)	0	1	0	48	0
CSKA Moscow	2012–13	Russian Premier League	19	0	5	0	2 (Note: Appearance in the UEFA Europa League)	0	-		26	0
CSKA Moscow	2013–14	Russian Premier League	17	0	0	0	5 (Note: Appearance in the UEFA Champions League)	0	1	0	23	0
CSKA Moscow	2014–15	Russian Premier League	21	1	3	0	2	0	1	0	27	1
CSKA Moscow	2015–16	Russian Premier League	13	2	4	0	6	0	-		23	2
CSKA Moscow	2016–17	Russian Premier League	7	0	1	0	2	0	0	0	10	0
CSKA Moscow	2017–18	Russian Premier League	19	0	1	0	6 (Note: Two appearances in the UEFA Champions League, and four appearances and one goal in the UEFA Europa League)	1	-		26	1
CSKA Moscow	2018–19	Russian Premier League	25	0	1	0	6	0	1	0	33	0
CSKA Moscow	2019–20	Russian Premier League	13	0	2	0	1	0	-		16	0
CSKA Moscow	2020–21	Russian Premier League	3	0	0	0	0	0	-		3	0
CSKA Moscow	2021–22	Russian Premier League	16	0	3	0	-		-		19	0
CSKA Moscow	2022–23	Russian Premier League	22	1	10	0	-		-		32	1
CSKA Moscow	2023–24	Russian Premier League	15	0	5	0	—		1	0	21	0
CSKA Moscow	Total		237	4	39	0	43	1	5	0	324	5
Career total			301	4	52	0	47	1	5	0	405	5

=== International ===
As of match played 21 March 2019

Appearances and goals by national team and year
National team	Year	Apps	Goals
Russia	2012	1	0
Russia	2013	1	0
Russia	2014	0	0
Russia	2015	0	0
Russia	2016	0	0
Russia	2017	0	0
Russia	2018	2	0
Russia	2019	1	0
Total		5	0

== Honours ==
CSKA Moscow

- Russian Premier League (3): 2012–13, 2013–14, 2015–16
- Russian Cup (3): 2010–11, 2012–13, 2022–23
- Russian Super Cup (3): 2013, 2014, 2018
