= Anton Zabolotny =

Russian footballer (born 1991)

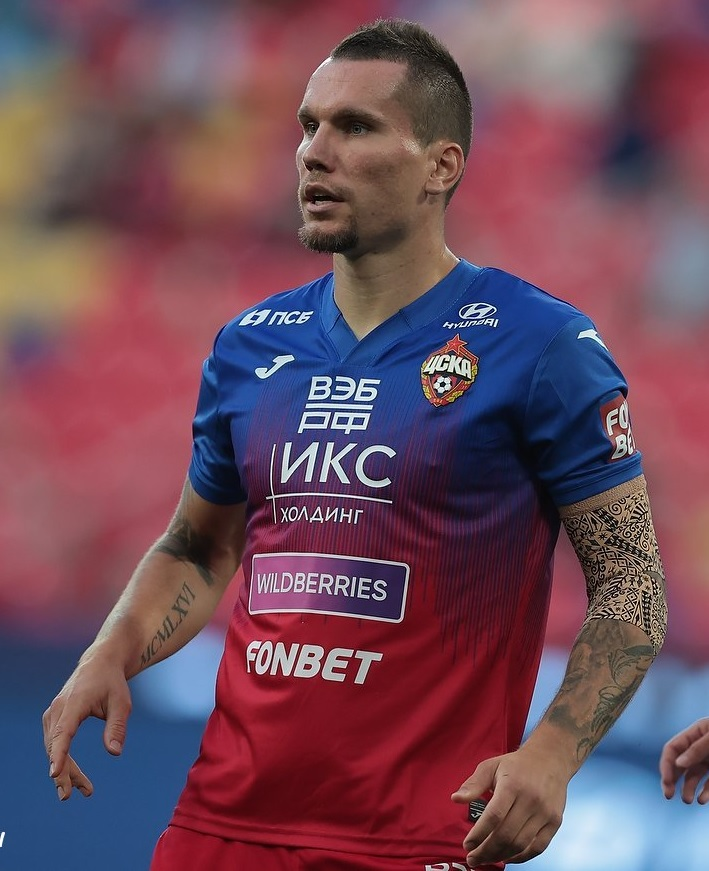
- Zabolotny with CSKA Moscow in 2021

Personal information
- Full name: Anton Konstantinovich Zabolotny
- Date of birth: 13 June 1991 (age 35)
- Place of birth: Aizpute, Latvian SSR, Soviet Union
- Height: 1.91 m (6 ft 3 in)
- Position: Striker

Team information
- Current team: SKA Rostov-on-Don

Youth career
- 1998–2004: Metallurg Lipetsk
- 2004–2008: CSKA Moscow

Senior career*
Years	Team	Apps	(Gls)
2009–2012	CSKA Moscow	0	(0)
2010	→ Volgar-Gazprom Astrakhan (loan)	16	(6)
2011	→ Ural Sverdlovsk Oblast (loan)	21	(6)
2012	→ Dynamo Bryansk (loan)	13	(2)
2013–2014	Ufa	30	(5)
2014–2016	Fakel Voronezh	37	(11)
2016	→ Tosno (loan)	10	(4)
2016–2017	Tosno	51	(20)
2018–2019	Zenit St. Petersburg	26	(1)
2019	→ Zenit-2 St. Petersburg	3	(1)
2019–2021	Sochi	48	(14)
2021–2024	CSKA Moscow	77	(17)
2024–2025	Khimki	29	(6)
2025–2026	Spartak Moscow	9	(0)
2026–	SKA Rostov-on-Don	0	(0)

International career^{‡}
2009–2010	Russia U19	5	(3)
2011–2012	Russia U21	5	(2)
2017–2021	Russia	19	(2)
- * Club domestic league appearances and goals as of 26 May 2026 ‡ National team caps and goals as of 27 May 2026

Anton Konstantinovich Zabolotny (Russian: Антон Константинович Заболотный; born 13 June 1991) is a professional football player who plays as a striker for SKA Rostov-on-Don. Born in Latvia, he played for the Russia national team.

== Club career ==
On 12 December 2017, he signed a 3.5-year contract with Zenit St. Petersburg.

Before the 2019–20 season, he was demoted to the PFL squad Zenit-2.

On 8 August 2019, he moved to PFC Sochi. On 31 May 2021, he returned to CSKA Moscow on a 3-year contract. He left CSKA in June 2024 after his contract expired.

On 19 June 2024, Zabolotny signed with Khimki.

On 1 July 2025, Zabolotny joined Spartak Moscow on a one-season contract. He left Spartak in June 2026 as his contract expired.

== International career ==
He made his debut for Russia national football team on 7 October 2017 in a friendly game against South Korea.

On 11 May 2018, he was included in Russia's extended 2018 FIFA World Cup squad as a back-up. He was not included in the finalized World Cup squad.

On 11 May 2021, he was included in the preliminary extended 30-man squad for UEFA Euro 2020. On 2 June 2021, he was included in the final squad. He did not appear in any games as Russia was eliminated at group stage.

== Career statistics ==
=== Club ===
As of match played 19 April 2026

Appearances and goals by club, season and competition
Club	Season	League			Cup		Europe		Other		Total	
Club	Season	Division	Apps	Goals	Apps	Goals	Apps	Goals	Apps	Goals	Apps	Goals
CSKA Moscow	2008	Russian Premier League	0	0	0	0	—		—		0	0
CSKA Moscow	2009	Russian Premier League	0	0	0	0	0	0	—		0	0
CSKA Moscow	2010	Russian Premier League	0	0	0	0	0	0	—		0	0
Volgar-Gazprom Astrakhan	2010	Russian First League	16	6	1	0	—		—		17	6
Ural Yekaterinburg	2011–12	Russian First League	21	6	1	0	—		—		22	6
Dynamo Bryansk	2011–12	Russian First League	13	2	—		—		—		13	2
CSKA Moscow	2012–13	Russian Premier League	0	0	0	0	0	0	0	0	0	0
Ufa	2012–13	Russian First League	5	1	—		—		—		5	1
Ufa	2013–14	Russian First League	25	4	1	0	—		3 (Note: Appearances in the FNL Cup)	1	29	5
Ufa	Total		30	5	1	0	0	0	3	1	34	6
Fakel Voronezh	2014–15	Russian Second League	19	10	0	0	—		—		19	10
Fakel Voronezh	2015–16	Russian First League	18	1	1	0	—		—		19	1
Fakel Voronezh	Total		37	11	1	0	0	0	0	0	38	11
Tosno	2015–16	Russian First League	10	4	—		—		—		10	4
Tosno	2016–17	Russian First League	32	16	2	0	—		—		34	16
Tosno	2017–18	Russian Premier League	19	4	0	0	—		—		19	4
Tosno	Total		61	24	2	0	0	0	0	0	63	24
Zenit	2017–18	Russian Premier League	10	1	—		4 (Note: Appearances in the UEFA Europa League)	0	—		14	1
Zenit	2018–19	Russian Premier League	16	0	2	1	12	2	—		30	3
Zenit	Total		26	1	2	1	16	2	0	0	44	4
Zenit-2	2019–20	Russian Second League	3	1	—		—		—		3	1
Sochi	2019–20	Russian Premier League	21	5	1	0	—		—		22	5
Sochi	2020–21	Russian Premier League	27	9	3	1	—		—		30	10
Sochi	Total		48	14	4	1	0	0	0	0	52	15
CSKA Moscow	2021–22	Russian Premier League	24	5	3	1	—		—		27	6
CSKA Moscow	2022–23	Russian Premier League	24	3	11	1	—		—		35	4
CSKA Moscow	2023–24	Russian Premier League	29	9	12	3	—		1 (Note: Appearance in Russian Super Cup)	0	42	12
CSKA Moscow	Total		77	17	26	5	0	0	1	0	104	22
Khimki	2024–25	Russian Premier League	29	6	2	0	—		—		31	6
Spartak Moscow	2025–26	Russian Premier League	9	0	7	0	—		—		16	0
Career total			370	93	47	7	16	2	4	1	437	103

=== International ===
As of match played 14 November 2021

Appearances and goals by national team and year
National team	Year	Apps	Goals
Russia	2017	3	0
Russia	2018	6	1
Russia	2020	2	0
Russia	2021	8	1
Total		19	1

As of 11 November 2021 (Russia score listed first, score column indicates score after each Zabolotny goal)

No.	Date	Venue	Opponent	Score	Result	Competition
1.	10 September 2018	Rostov Arena, Rostov-on-Don, Russia	Czech Republic	2–0	5–1	Friendly
2.	11 November 2021	Krestovsky Stadium, Saint Petersburg, Russia	Cyprus	5–0	6–0	2022 FIFA World Cup qualification

== Honours ==
Zenit Saint Petersburg

- Russian Premier League: 2018–19

CSKA Moscow

- Russian Cup: 2022–23

Spartak Moscow

- Russian Cup: 2025–26
