= Nikita Yermakov =

Russian footballer (born 2003)

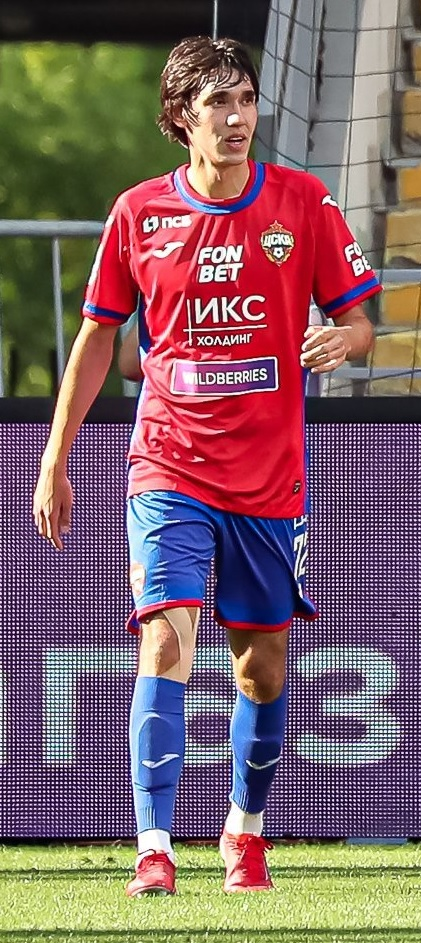
- Yermakov with CSKA Moscow in 2022

Personal information
- Full name: Nikita Vladlenovich Yermakov
- Date of birth: 19 January 2003 (age 23)
- Place of birth: Syzran, Russia
- Height: 1.81 m (5 ft 11 in)
- Position: Attacking midfielder

Team information
- Current team: Nizhny Novgorod
- Number: 19

Youth career
- CSKA Moscow

Senior career*
Years	Team	Apps	(Gls)
2022–2024	CSKA Moscow	27	(0)
2023–2024	→ Pari NN (loan)	12	(0)
2024–	Nizhny Novgorod	41	(0)

International career^{‡}
2018	Russia U16	3	(0)
2019–2020	Russia U17	3	(1)
2021	Russia U18	2	(1)
2021	Russia U19	5	(0)
2022	Russia U21	3	(3)
- * Club domestic league appearances and goals as of 22 April 2026 ‡ National team caps and goals as of 16 November 2022

Nikita Vladlenovich Yermakov (Russian: Никита Владленович Ермаков; born 19 January 2003) is a Russian football player who plays as an attacking midfielder for Nizhny Novgorod.

== Club career ==
He made his debut in the Russian Premier League for CSKA Moscow on 16 July 2022 in a game against Ural Yekaterinburg.

On 28 December 2023, Yermakov joined Pari NN on loan for the rest of the season, with an option to buy. On 15 June 2024, Pari exercised their option to buy and signed a four-year contract with Yermakov.

== International career ==
Yermakov was first called up to the Russia national football team for a training camp in September 2023.

== Career statistics ==
As of match played 22 April 2026

Appearances and goals by club, season and competition
Club	Season	League			Cup		Other		Total	
Club	Season	Division	Apps	Goals	Apps	Goals	Apps	Goals	Apps	Goals
CSKA Moscow	2022–23	Russian Premier League	22	0	9	2	—		31	2
CSKA Moscow	2023–24	Russian Premier League	5	0	4	1	1 (Note: Appearance in Russian Super Cup)	0	10	1
CSKA Moscow	Total		27	0	13	3	1	0	41	3
Pari Nizhny Novgorod (loan)	2023–24	Russian Premier League	12	0	—		2 (Note: Appearances in relegation play-offs)	0	14	0
Pari Nizhny Novgorod	2024–25	Russian Premier League	23	0	3	0	1	0	27	0
Pari Nizhny Novgorod	2025–26	Russian Premier League	18	0	4	0	—		22	0
Pari Nizhny Novgorod	Total		41	0	7	0	1	0	49	0
Career total			80	0	20	3	4	0	104	3

== Honours ==
=== Club ===
CSKA Moscow

- Russian Cup: 2022–23
