= Maksim Mukhin =

Russian footballer (born 2001)

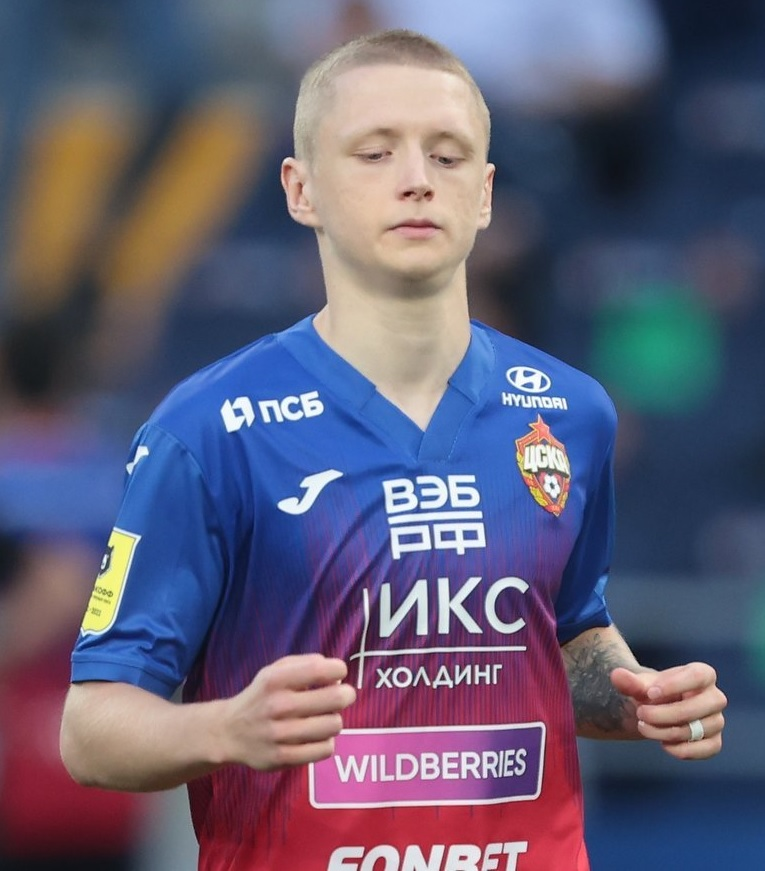
- Mukhin with CSKA Moscow in 2021

Personal information
- Full name: Maksim Andreyevich Mukhin
- Date of birth: 4 November 2001 (age 25)
- Place of birth: Tolyatti, Russia
- Height: 1.81 m (5 ft 11 in)
- Position: Defensive midfielder

Team information
- Current team: Rostov
- Number: 16

Youth career
- Konoplyov football academy
- 2017–2019: Krylia Sovetov Samara

Senior career*
Years	Team	Apps	(Gls)
2019–2021	Lokomotiv Moscow	10	(0)
2019–2021	→ Kazanka Moscow	10	(1)
2021–2026	CSKA Moscow	55	(3)
2025–2026	→ Sochi (loan)	20	(1)
2026–	Rostov	7	(0)

International career^{‡}
2021	Russia U21	4	(0)
2021–	Russia	7	(0)
- * Club domestic league appearances and goals as of 17 September 2026 ‡ National team caps and goals as of 16 October 2023

Maksim Andreyevich Mukhin (Russian: Максим Андреевич Мухин; born 4 November 2001) is a Russian professional footballer who plays as a defensive midfielder for Rostov.

== Club career ==
He made his debut in the Russian Premier League for FC Lokomotiv Moscow on 8 November 2020 in a game against FC Dynamo Moscow.

On 28 May 2021, he signed a 5-year contract with CSKA Moscow.

On 31 July 2025, Mukhin was loaned by Sochi.

On 22 June 2026, Mukhin signed with Rostov.

== International career ==
He was called up to the Russia national football team for the first time in March 2021 for the World Cup qualifiers against Malta, Slovenia and Slovakia. He received his call-up at the age of 19 despite never before representing Russia at junior levels and only having 5 starts in the Russian Premier League at that point. Some of the other players at his defensive midfielder position were injured and other potential replacements were already registered for the 2021 UEFA European Under-21 Championship squad, the Under-21 Euro schedule conflicted with the World Cup qualifiers schedule. He made his debut on 27 March 2021 against Slovenia, substituting Rifat Zhemaletdinov in the 87th minute.

On 11 May 2021, he was included in the preliminary extended 30-man squad for UEFA Euro 2020. On 2 June 2021, he was included in the final squad. He appeared as a second half-substitute in all three of Russia's group stage games as they were eliminated after beating Finland and losing to Belgium and Denmark.

== Career statistics ==
=== Club ===
As of match played 14 October 2026

Appearances and goals by club, season and competition
Club	Season	League			Cup		Continental		Other		Total	
Club	Season	Division	Apps	Goals	Apps	Goals	Apps	Goals	Apps	Goals	Apps	Goals
Lokomotiv Moscow	2019–20	Russian Premier League	0	0	0	0	0	0	–		0	0
Lokomotiv Moscow	2020–21	Russian Premier League	10	0	4	0	1 (Note: Appearance in the UEFA Champions League)	0	–		15	0
Lokomotiv Moscow	Total		10	0	4	0	1	0	–		15	0
Kazanka Moscow (loan)	2019–20	Russian Second League	2	1	–		–		–		2	1
Kazanka Moscow (loan)	2020–21	Russian Second League	8	0	–		–		–		8	0
Kazanka Moscow (loan)	Total		10	1	0	0	0	0	–		10	1
CSKA Moscow	2021–22	Russian Premier League	26	0	3	0	–		–		29	0
CSKA Moscow	2022–23	Russian Premier League	17	1	6	0	–		–		23	1
CSKA Moscow	2023–24	Russian Premier League	12	2	3	0	–		1 (Note: Appearance in Russian Super Cup)	0	16	2
CSKA Moscow	2024–25	Russian Premier League	0	0	1	0	–		–		1	0
CSKA Moscow	Total		55	3	13	0	0	0	1	0	69	3
Sochi (loan)	2025–26	Russian Premier League	20	1	4	0	–		–		24	1
Rostov	2026–27	Russian Premier League	7	0	2	0	–		–		9	0
Career total			102	5	23	0	1	0	1	0	127	5

=== International ===
As of match played 16 October 2023

Appearances and goals by national team and year
National team	Year	Apps	Goals
Russia	2021	5	0
Russia	2023	2	0
Total		7	0

== Honours ==
=== Club ===
Lokomotiv Moscow

- Russian Cup: 2020–21

CSKA Moscow

- Russian Cup: 2022–23, 2024–25
