= Adolfo Gaich =

Argentine association football player (born 1999)

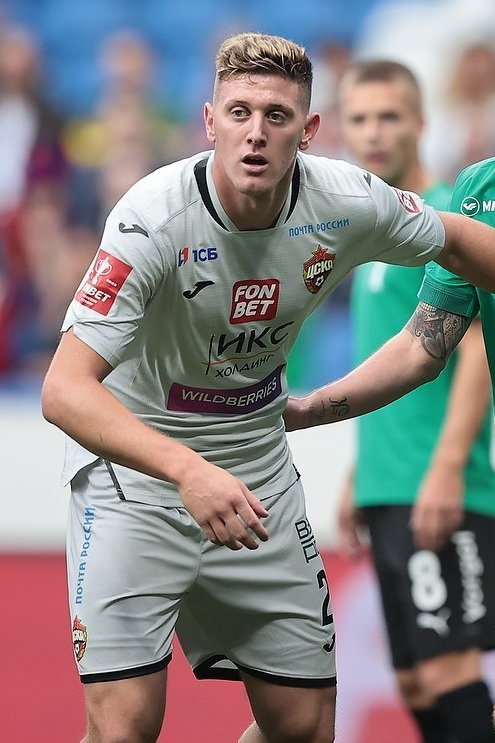
- Gaich with CSKA Moscow in 2022

Personal information
- Full name: Adolfo Julián Gaich
- Date of birth: 26 February 1999 (age 27)
- Place of birth: Bengolea, Argentina
- Height: 6 ft 3 in (1.90 m)
- Position: Forward

Team information
- Current team: Estudiantes
- Number: 19

Youth career
- Unión Bengolea
- Sportivo Chazón
- Atenas
- –2014: Atlético Pascanas
- 2014–2018: San Lorenzo

Senior career*
Years	Team	Apps	(Gls)
2018–2020	San Lorenzo	23	(7)
2020–2025	CSKA Moscow	27	(1)
2021	→ Benevento (loan)	15	(2)
2021–2022	→ Huesca (loan)	28	(1)
2023	→ Hellas Verona (loan)	16	(2)
2023–2024	→ Çaykur Rizespor (loan)	33	(8)
2024–2025	→ Antalyaspor (loan)	33	(8)
2025	→ Krylia Sovetov Samara (loan)	3	(0)
2026–	Estudiantes	21	(4)

International career^{‡}
2018–2019	Argentina U20	17	(7)
2019–2021	Argentina U23	14	(3)
2019	Argentina	1	(0)
Medal record
Representing Argentina
Men's Football
Pan American Games
Gold medal – first place	2019 Lima	Team competition
- * Club domestic league appearances and goals as of 17:30, 21 November 2026 (UTC) ‡ National team caps and goals as of 28 July 2021

Adolfo Julián Gaich (born 26 February 1999) is an Argentine professional footballer who plays as a forward for Estudiantes.

== Club career ==
=== San Lorenzo ===
Gaich had youth spells with Unión Bengolea, Sportivo Chazón, Atenas and Atlético Pascanas before joining San Lorenzo in 2014. Four years later, Gaich was promoted into their first-team under Claudio Biaggio, making his professional debut on 27 August 2018 during a draw with Unión Santa Fe; he had previously been an unused substitute in an Argentine Primera División fixture with Lanús and for a Copa Sudamericana game against Nacional. Gaich scored his first senior goal in the following September, netting the opener in a 3–2 win over Patronato; which preceded another two appearances later in the Copa Argentina versus Estudiantes.

=== CSKA Moscow ===
On 17 July 2020, Gaich said goodbye to San Lorenzo supporters via Fox Sports' 90 Minutos de Fútbol ahead of a potential move to Russian football with CSKA Moscow. On 30 July 2020, San Lorenzo confirmed the transfer. On 5 August 2020, CSKA announced the signing of a 5-year contract. He made his league debut off the bench against Khimki on 8 August, before starting for the first time in a defeat to Zenit Saint Petersburg on 19 August. Gaich's first goal arrived on 22 October in a UEFA Europa League group stage draw away in Austria against Wolfsberger AC.

==== Loan to Benevento ====
On 29 January 2021, Gaich moved to Serie A club Benevento on loan. The deal includes an option to buy. After sub appearances against Napoli and Hellas Verona, the centre-forward made his first start and scored his first goal in an away match versus Spezia on 6 March. He netted again on 21 March to secure a 1–0 away victory over Juventus.

==== Loan to Huesca ====
On 30 August 2021, Gaich switched teams and countries again after agreeing to a one-year loan deal with SD Huesca in the Spanish Segunda División. He returned to CSKA for the 2022–23 season.

==== Loan to Hellas Verona ====
On 31 January 2023, Hellas Verona welcomed Adolfo Gaich to the team, the Argentinian striker signed a temporary contract until 30 June 2023 on loan from CSKA Moscow. Before going on loan, Gaich extended his contract with CSKA Moscow until the end of 2025.

==== Loan to Çaykur Rizespor ====
On 14 September 2023, CSKA Moscow announced that Gaich extended his contract with CSKA to 2026 and moved on loan to Çaykur Rizespor in Turkey.

==== Loan to Antalyaspor ====
On 13 August 2024, Gaich returned to Turkey and joined Antalyaspor on loan with an option to buy.

==== Loan to Krylia Sovetov ====
On 29 August 2025, Gaich moved on loan to Krylia Sovetov Samara for the 2025–26 season. The loan was terminated early on 14 January 2026.

=== Estudiantes ===
On 14 January 2026, Gaich returned to Argentina and signed a three-season contract with Estudiantes.

== International career ==
In 2018, Gaich was selected by the Argentina U20s for the L'Alcúdia International Tournament in Spain. He scored three goals, one in Argentina's group opener with Venezuela and two on the next matchday against Murcia, in five appearances as his nation won the trophy. In December, Gaich was picked for the 2019 South American U-20 Championship. Another U20 call-up came in May 2019 as Fernando Batista called him up to his 2019 FIFA U-20 World Cup squad. He subsequently scored goals in Poland against South Africa, Portugal and Mali. In the following months, Gaich made the U23s' squad for the 2019 Pan American Games.

At the Pan American Games in Peru, Gaich netted twice on his debut in a 2–3 win over Ecuador; also assisting the other goal. Further goals occurred versus Mexico and Panama, which preceded two in the semi-finals against Uruguay. Argentina won the final against Honduras, which gave Gaich a goal medal. Gaich was, soon after, selected by Lionel Scaloni's seniors for September friendlies with Chile and Mexico. He made his full international bow, aged twenty, in a 4–0 victory over Mexico at the Alamodome on 10 September, having remained on the bench against Chile days prior.

== Personal life ==
Born and raised in Argentina, Gaich is of German descent.

== Career statistics ==
=== Club ===
As of match played 27 November 2025.

Appearances and goals by club, season and competition
Club	Season	League			Cup		League Cup		Continental		Other		Total	
Club	Season	Division	Apps	Goals	Apps	Goals	Apps	Goals	Apps	Goals	Apps	Goals	Apps	Goals
San Lorenzo	2018–19	Argentine Primera División	11	2	1	1	1	0	2 (Note: Appearance(s) in the Copa Libertadores and Copa Sudamericana)	0	0	0	15	3
San Lorenzo	2019–20	Argentine Primera División	12	5	0	0	1	0	0	0	0	0	13	5
San Lorenzo	Total		23	7	1	1	2	0	2	0	0	0	28	8
CSKA Moscow	2020–21	Russian Premier League	13	0	0	0	—		5 (Note: Appearance(s) in the UEFA Europa League)	1	0	0	18	1
CSKA Moscow	2021–22	Russian Premier League	1	0	—		—		—		—		1	0
CSKA Moscow	2022–23	Russian Premier League	8	1	3	1	—		—		—		11	2
CSKA Moscow	2023–24	Russian Premier League	4	0	2	0	—		—		1 (Note: Appearance in Russian Super Cup)	0	7	0
CSKA Moscow	2024–25	Russian Premier League	1	0	1	0	—		—		—		2	0
CSKA Moscow	Total		27	1	6	1	0	0	5	1	1	0	39	3
Benevento (loan)	2020–21	Serie A	15	2	—		—		—		—		15	2
Huesca (loan)	2021–22	Segunda División	28	1	1	0	—		—		—		29	1
Hellas Verona (loan)	2022–23	Serie A	16	2	—		—		—		—		16	2
Çaykur Rizespor (loan)	2023–24	Süper Lig	33	8	2	3	—		—		—		35	11
Antalyaspor (loan)	2024–25	Süper Lig	33	8	5	1	—		—		—		38	9
Krylia Sovetov Samara (loan)	2025–26	Russian Premier League	3	0	3	0	—		—		—		6	0
Career total			178	29	18	6	2	0	7	1	1	0	206	36

=== International ===
As of 11 September 2019.

National team	Year	Apps	Goals
Argentina	2019	1	0
Total		1	0

== Honours ==
CSKA Moscow

- Russian Cup: 2022–23, 2024–25

Argentina U20

- L'Alcúdia International Football Tournament: 2018

Argentina U23

- Pan American Games: 2019
- Pre-Olympic Tournament: 2020
