= Renat Golybin =

Russian footballer (born 2005)

Personal information
- Full name: Renat Andreyevich Golybin
- Date of birth: 30 August 2005 (age 21)
- Height: 1.82 m (6 ft 0 in)
- Positions: Winger; attacking midfielder

Team information
- Current team: Orenburg
- Number: 27

Youth career
- CSKA Moscow

Senior career*
Years	Team	Apps	(Gls)
2024–2025	CSKA Moscow	1	(0)
2024–2025	→ Neftekhimik Nizhnekamsk (loan)	8	(0)
2025–2026	KAMAZ Naberezhnye Chelny	27	(2)
2026–	Orenburg	22	(0)
- * Club domestic league appearances and goals as of 21 November 2026

Renat Andreyevich Golybin (Russian: Ренат Андреевич Голыбин; born 30 August 2005) is a Russian football player who plays as a winger or an attacking midfielder for Orenburg.

== Career ==
Golybin made his debut in the Russian Premier League for CSKA Moscow on 25 May 2024 in a game against Ural Yekaterinburg.

On 19 February 2026, Golybin signed with Orenburg.

== Career statistics ==
As of 21 November 2026

Club	Season	League			Cup		Total	
Club	Season	Division	Apps	Goals	Apps	Goals	Apps	Goals
CSKA Moscow	2023–24	Russian Premier League	1	0	0	0	1	0
Neftekhimik Nizhnekamsk (loan)	2024–25	Russian First League	8	0	1	0	9	0
KAMAZ Naberezhnye Chelny	2024–25	Russian First League	8	0	–		8	0
KAMAZ Naberezhnye Chelny	2025–26	Russian First League	19	2	4	0	23	2
KAMAZ Naberezhnye Chelny	Total		27	2	4	0	31	2
Orenburg	2025–26	Russian Premier League	9	0	1	0	10	0
Orenburg	2026–27	Russian Premier League	13	0	4	3	17	3
Orenburg	Total		22	0	5	3	27	3
Career total			58	2	10	3	68	5
