= Yegor Noskov =

Russian footballer

Personal information
- Full name: Yegor Dmitriyevich Noskov
- Date of birth: 24 March 2003 (age 23)
- Place of birth: Moscow, Russia
- Height: 1.77 m (5 ft 10 in)
- Position: Left-back

Team information
- Current team: SKA-Khabarovsk
- Number: 91

Youth career
- –2018: Chertanovo
- 2018–2020: Yunost Moskvy-Torpedo Moscow
- 2020–2023: CSKA Moscow

Senior career*
Years	Team	Apps	(Gls)
2023–2025	CSKA Moscow	4	(0)
2023–2024	→ Volga Ulyanovsk (loan)	21	(0)
2024–2025	→ SKA-Khabarovsk (loan)	21	(0)
2025–	SKA-Khabarovsk	30	(1)
- * Club domestic league appearances and goals as of 16 May 2026

Yegor Dmitriyevich Noskov (Russian: Егор Дмитриевич Носков; born 24 March 2003) is a Russian football player who plays as a left back for SKA-Khabarovsk.

== Career ==
Noskov made his debut in the Russian Premier League for CSKA Moscow on 5 March 2023 in a game against Sochi.

On 14 September 2023, Noskov extended his contract with CSKA to 2026 and moved on loan to Volga Ulyanovsk for the 2023–24 season.

On 12 July 2024, Noskov joined SKA-Khabarovsk on loan with an option to buy. On 3 June 2025, SKA-Khabarovsk made the transfer permanent and signed a two-year contract with Noskov.

== Career statistics ==
As of match played 30 August 2023

Appearances and goals by club, season and competition
Club	Season	League			Cup		Continental		Other		Total	
Club	Season	Division	Apps	Goals	Apps	Goals	Apps	Goals	Apps	Goals	Apps	Goals
CSKA Moscow	2022–23	Russian Premier League	4	0	0	0	—		—		4	0
CSKA Moscow	2023–24	Russian Premier League	0	0	2	0	—		—		2	0
Career total			4	0	2	0	0	0	0	0	6	0

== Honours ==
=== Club ===
CSKA Moscow

- Russian Cup: 2022–23
