= Vladislav Torop =

Russian footballer

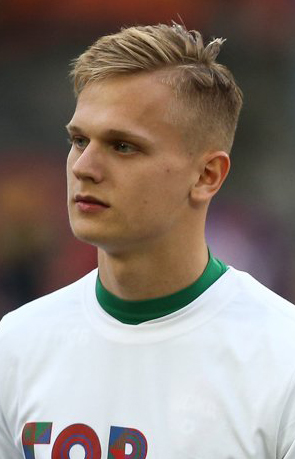
- Torop with CSKA Moscow in 2022

Personal information
- Full name: Vladislav Leonidovich Torop
- Date of birth: 7 November 2003 (age 23)
- Place of birth: Moscow, Russia
- Height: 1.91 m (6 ft 3 in)
- Position: Goalkeeper

Team information
- Current team: CSKA Moscow
- Number: 49

Youth career
- CSKA Moscow

Senior career*
Years	Team	Apps	(Gls)
2019–	CSKA Moscow	32	(0)

International career^{‡}
2018	Russia U15	3	(0)
2019	Russia U16	1	(0)
2021	Russia U18	3	(0)
2021	Russia U19	4	(0)
2022	Russia U21	1	(0)
- * Club domestic league appearances and goals as of 18 October 2026 ‡ National team caps and goals as of 24 September 2022

Vladislav Leonidovich Torop (Russian: Владислав Леонидович Тороп; born 7 November 2003) is a Russian football player who plays as a goalkeeper for CSKA Moscow.

== Club career ==
He joined the senior squad of CSKA Moscow as a back-up to Igor Akinfeev in August 2019. He made his debut for the main team of CSKA Moscow on 23 September 2021 in a Russian Cup game against Zenit-Izhevsk.

On 30 December 2021, he extended his contract with CSKA until the end of the 2025–26 season.

He made his Russian Premier League debut for CSKA on 7 May 2022 against Sochi.

== International career ==
Torop was first called up to the Russia national football team for a training camp in September 2023.

== Career statistics ==
=== Club ===
As of match played 29 October 2026

Appearances and goals by club, season and competition
Club	Season	League			Cup		Europe		Total	
Club	Season	Division	Apps	Goals	Apps	Goals	Apps	Goals	Apps	Goals
CSKA Moscow	2019–20	Russian Premier League	0	0	0	0	0	0	0	0
CSKA Moscow	2020–21	Russian Premier League	0	0	0	0	0	0	0	0
CSKA Moscow	2021–22	Russian Premier League	1	0	2	0	—		3	0
CSKA Moscow	2022–23	Russian Premier League	1	0	5	0	—		6	0
CSKA Moscow	2023–24	Russian Premier League	5	0	11	0	—		16	0
CSKA Moscow	2024–25	Russian Premier League	2	0	11	0	—		13	0
CSKA Moscow	2025–26	Russian Premier League	12	0	11	0	—		23	0
CSKA Moscow	2026–27	Russian Premier League	11	0	1	0	—		12	0
Career total			32	0	41	0	0	0	73	0

== Honours ==
=== Club ===
CSKA Moscow

- Russian Cup: 2022–23, 2024–25
