= 2023–24 FC Akhmat Grozny season =

FC Akhmat Grozny
2023–24 season
- Chairman: Magomed Daudov
- Manager: Sergei Tashuyev (until 15 August); Isa Baytiyev (Caretaker) (15-18 August); Miroslav Romaschenko (18 August-4 April); Magomed Adiyev (from 5 April)
- Stadium: Akhmat-Arena
- Premier League: 10th
- Russian Cup: Regions path Quarter-finals Stage 2 vs Orenburg
- Top goalscorer: League: Mohamed Konaté (11); All: Mohamed Konaté (13)
- Highest home attendance: 5,819 vs Ural Yekaterinburg (2 March 2024)
- Lowest home attendance: 3,567 vs Baltika Kaliningrad (10 August 2023)
- Average home league attendance: 4,858 (19 May 2024)
Home colours	Away colours

The 2023–24 FC Akhmat Grozny season was the 15th successive season that the club are playing in the Russian Premier League, the highest tier of association football in Russia. They also played in the Russian Cup, but were eliminated in the first round.

== Season events ==
On 15 August, Sergei Tashuyev left his role as head coach by mutual consent, with Isa Baytiyev being put in temporary charge.

On 18 August Akhmat announced the appointment of Miroslav Romaschenko as their new head coach, on a three-year contract.

On 4 April, Miroslav Romaschenko resigned from his role, with Magomed Adiyev taking charge the following day whilst also remaining head coach of Kazakhstan.

== Squad ==
As of match played 25 May 2024

No.	Name	Nationality	Position	Date of birth (age)	Signed from	Signed in	Contract ends	Apps.	Goals
Goalkeepers
1	Mikhail Oparin	(Russia)	GK	22 May 1993 (aged 31)	Yenisey Krasnoyarsk	2022		16	0
72	Yakhya Magomedov	(Russia)	GK	6 April 2007 (aged 17)	Academy	2024		0	0
88	Giorgi Sheliya	(Russia)	GK	11 December 1988 (aged 35)	Tambov	2020		95	0
Defenders
4	Turpal-Ali Ibishev	(Russia)	DF	18 February 2002 (aged 22)	Academy	2021		7	0
5	Miloš Šatara	(Bosnia and Herzegovina)	DF	28 October 1995 (aged 28)	Shakhtyor Soligorsk	2023		17	1
6	Jasmin Čeliković	(Bosnia and Herzegovina)	DF	7 January 1999 (aged 25)	on loan from Tuzla City	2023		29	1
8	Miroslav Bogosavac	(Serbia)	DF	14 October 1996 (aged 27)	Čukarički	2020	2024	129	0
15	Andrei Semyonov	(Russia)	DF	24 March 1989 (aged 35)	Amkar Perm	2014		289	8
36	Lucas Lovat	(Brazil)	DF	15 January 1997 (aged 27)	Slovan Bratislava	2024	2027	13	1
40	Rizvan Utsiyev	(Russia)	DF	7 February 1988 (aged 36)	Trainee	2005		312	8
55	Darko Todorović	(Bosnia and Herzegovina)	DF	5 May 1997 (aged 27)	Red Bull Salzburg	2022		68	2
59	Yevgeni Kharin	(Russia)	DF	11 June 1995 (aged 28)	Levadia Tallinn	2018		140	11
75	Nader Ghandri	(Tunisia)	DF	18 February 1995 (aged 29)	Ajman	2024	2026	13	0
Midfielders
7	Bernard Berisha	(Kosovo)	MF	24 October 1991 (aged 32)	Anzhi Makhachkala	2016		181	24
10	Lechi Sadulayev	(Russia)	MF	8 January 2000 (aged 24)	Academy	2018		89	9
14	Amine Talal	(Morocco)	MF	5 June 1996 (aged 27)	Sheriff Tiraspol	2024		0	0
16	Camilo	(Brazil)	MF	23 February 1999 (aged 25)	Olympique Lyonnais	2023		29	1
18	Vladislav Kamilov	(Russia)	MF	29 August 1995 (aged 28)	Ufa	2022		52	3
21	Ivan Oleynikov	(Russia)	MF	24 August 1998 (aged 25)	Chayka Peschanokopskoye	2022		66	9
23	Anton Shvets	(Russia)	MF	26 April 1993 (aged 31)	Villarreal B	2017		165	11
24	Zaim Divanović	(Montenegro)	MF	9 December 2000 (aged 23)	Shakhtyor Soligorsk	2023		15	0
33	Minkail Matsuyev	(Russia)	MF	3 February 2000 (aged 24)	Unattached	2023		3	0
71	Magomed Yakuyev	(Russia)	MF	7 June 2004 (aged 19)	Academy	2022		4	0
94	Artyom Timofeyev	(Russia)	MF	12 January 1994 (aged 30)	Spartak Moscow	2021	2024	114	15
98	Svetoslav Kovachev	(Bulgaria)	MF	14 March 1998 (aged 26)	on loan from Arda Kardzhali	2023		31	4
Forwards
9	Gamid Agalarov	(Russia)	FW	16 July 2000 (aged 23)	Ufa	2022		52	8
13	Mohamed Konaté	(Burkina Faso)	FW	12 December 1997 (aged 26)	Khimki	2021	2022(+2)	90	34
29	Vladimir Ilyin	(Russia)	FW	20 May 1992 (aged 32)	Krasnodar	2022		102	22
47	Néné Gbamblé	(Ivory Coast)	FW	9 May 2002 (aged 22)	Celje	2023		15	1
Away on loan
3	Vladislav Volkov	(Russia)	DF	18 May 2000 (aged 24)	Chayka Peschanokopskoye	2023		6	0
35	Rizvan Tashayev	(Russia)	GK	5 October 2003 (aged 20)	Academy	2022		1	0
	Ilya Moseychuk	(Russia)	MF	19 March 2000 (aged 24)	Tekstilshchik Ivanovo	2020		0	0
Players that left Akhmat Grozny during the season
11	Daniel Júnior	(Brazil)	MF	9 May 2002 (aged 22)	on loan from Cruzeiro	2023		7	0
19	Marat Bystrov	(Kazakhstan)	DF	19 June 1992 (aged 31)	Ordabasy	2020		83	0
48	Mikail Akhmedov	(Russia)	DF	1 January 2004 (aged 20)	Academy	2023		1	0
	Magomed-Deni Tsutsulayev	(Russia)	GK	30 July 2003 (aged 20)	Academy	2020		0	0
	Islam Alsultanov	(Russia)	FW	18 August 2001 (aged 22)	Academy	2020		13	1

=== Out on loan ===
Note: Flags indicate national team as defined under FIFA eligibility rules; some limited exceptions apply. Players may hold more than one non-FIFA nationality.

No. / Pos. / Nation / Player; — / DF / RUS / Vladislav Volkov (at Leningradets Leningrad Oblast until 30 June 2024)	No. / Pos. / Nation / Player; — / FW / RUS / Ilya Moseychuk (at Kuban Krasnodar until 30 June 2024)

== Transfers ==
=== In ===
Date	Position	Nationality	Name	From	Fee	Ref.
14 June 2023	DF	(Russia)	Vladislav Volkov	Chayka Peschanokopskoye	Undisclosed	
3 August 2023	MF	(Bulgaria)	Svetoslav Kovachev	Arda Kardzhali	Undisclosed	
9 August 2023	MF	(Brazil)	Camilo	Lyon	Undisclosed	
18 January 2024	DF	(Brazil)	Lucas Lovat	Slovan Bratislava	Undisclosed	
6 February 2024	DF	(Tunisia)	Nader Ghandri	Ajman	Undisclosed	
20 February 2024	MF	(Morocco)	Amine Talal	Sheriff Tiraspol	Undisclosed	

=== Loans in ===
Date from	Position	Nationality	Name	From	Date to	Ref.
11 July 2023	DF	(Bosnia and Herzegovina)	Jasmin Čeliković	Tuzla City	End of season	
11 September 2023	MF	(Brazil)	Daniel Júnior	Cruzeiro	9 February 2024	

=== Loans out ===
Date from	Position	Nationality	Name	To	Date to	Ref.
5 July 2023	DF	(Russia)	Turpal-Ali Ibishev	FC Druzhba Maykop	31 December 2023	
9 January 2024	DF	(Russia)	Vladislav Volkov	Leningradets Leningrad Oblast	End of season	
16 February 2024	GK	(Russia)	Rizvan Tashayev	Dynamo Bryansk	Undisclosed	

=== Released ===
Date	Position	Nationality	Name	Joined	Date	Ref.
9 January 2024	DF	(Kazakhstan)	Marat Bystrov	Astana	19 January 2024	
20 January 2024	FW	(Russia)	Islam Alsultanov			
31 May 2024	DF	(Russia)	Andrei Semyonov			
31 May 2024	MF	(Russia)	Ilya Moseychuk	Kuban Krasnodar		
31 May 2024	FW	(Russia)	Vladimir Ilyin	Fakel Voronezh	21 June 2024	
31 May 2024	FW	(Burkina Faso)	Mohamed Konaté	Al-Riyadh	21 August 2024	

== Friendlies ==
25 June 2023	Dynamo Makhachkala	1 – 1	Akhmat Grozny	Kislovodsk
17:00 MSK (UTC+3)				Stadium: Stadion Kislovodsk

1 July 2023	Akhmat Grozny	4 – 2	Zenit-2 St.Petersburg	Kislovodsk
17:00 MSK (UTC+3)				Stadium: Stadion Kislovodsk

== Competitions ==
=== Overview ===
Competition	First match	Last match	Starting round	Final position	Record							
Competition	First match	Last match	Starting round	Final position	Pld	W	D	L	GF	GA	GD	Win %
Premier League	22 July 2023	25 May 2024	Matchday 1	10th	30	10	5	15	33	45	−12	33.33
Russian Cup	25 July 2023	4 April 2024	Group stage	Regions path Quarter-finals Stage 2	8	3	1	4	12	14	−2	37.50
Total					38	13	6	19	45	59	−14	34.21

Last updated: 25 May 2024
Source: Competitions

=== Premier League ===
==== Results summary ====
Overall								Home						Away					
Pld	W	D	L	GF	GA	GD	Pts	W	D	L	GF	GA	GD	W	D	L	GF	GA	GD
30	10	5	15	33	45	−12	35	5	3	7	21	26	−5	5	2	8	12	19	−7

Last updated: 25 May 2024.
Source: See Results

==== Results by round ====
Round	1	2	3	4	5	6	7	8	9	10	11	12	13	14	15	16	17	18	19	20	22	23	24	25	21^{1}	26	27	28	29	30
Ground	H	H	A	A	H	A	A	H	A	H	H	A	A	H	A	A	H	H	H	A	A	H	H	A	H	H	A	A	H	A
Result	L	L	W	L	W	D	W	D	L	D	L	L	L	L	L	D	W	D	W	L	L	L	L	W	W	W	W	W	L	L
Position	13	14	11	12	9	11	10	10	10	10	11	12	13	14	15	14	13	13	12	12	12	13	15	15	12	10	10	10	10	10

Updated to match(es) played on 25 May 2024. Source: See Results
A = Away; H = Home; W = Win; D = Draw; L = Loss

==== Results ====
22 July 2023 1	Akhmat Grozny	1 – 2	Krylia Sovetov	Grozny
20:00 MSK (UTC+3)	Kamilov (yellow card) 54'; Čeliković (yellow card) 67'; Agalarov 90+' (pen.)	Report	Garré 13'; Yezhov (yellow card) 58'; Fernando (yellow card) 71'; Babkin 85'	Stadium: Akhmat-Arena; Attendance: 4,777; Referee: Sergei Karasev

30 July 2023 2	Akhmat Grozny	2 – 3	CSKA Moscow	Grozny
20:00 MSK (UTC+3)	Bystrov (red card) 12'; Konaté 27' (pen.), 45+' (pen.); Semyonov (yellow card) 65' (yellow-red card) 90+'; Kamilov (yellow card) 79'; Sheliya (yellow card) 90+'	Report	Chalov 13' (pen.), 45+' (pen.), 79' (pen.); Zaynutdinov (yellow card) 19'; Gajić (red card) 45+'	Stadium: Akhmat-Arena; Attendance: 5,612; Referee: Vladislav Bezborodov

6 August 2023 3	Sochi	1 – 2	Akhmat Grozny	Sochi
20:00 MSK (UTC+3)	Noboa 36' (pen.); Đorđević (yellow card) 50'	Report	Ilyin 42'; Timofeyev 45+'; Čeliković (yellow card) 90+'	Stadium: Fisht Olympic Stadium; Attendance: 5,366; Referee: Pavel Shadykhanov

14 August 2023 4	Pari Nizhny Novgorod	2 – 0	Akhmat Grozny	Nizhny Novgorod
19:30 MSK (UTC+3)	Sevikyan 1'; Maiga (yellow card) 31'; Suleymanov 39'	Report	Semyonov (yellow card) 5'; Kharin (yellow card) 20'; Volkov (yellow card) 48'; Timofeyev (yellow card) 80'; Bogosavac (yellow card) 87'	Stadium: Nizhny Novgorod Stadium; Attendance: 7,935; Referee: Vitali Meshkov

20 August 2023 5	Akhmat Grozny	4 – 0	Orenburg	Grozny
20:00 MSK (UTC+3)	Timofeyev 9'; Berisha 24'; Ilyin 35' (yellow card) 59'; Camilo 87'	Report	Gojković (yellow card) 36'; Florentín (yellow card) 74'; Obukhov (yellow card) 74'	Stadium: Akhmat-Arena; Attendance: 4,280; Referee: Evgeny Turbin

26 August 2023 6	Spartak Moscow	0 – 0	Akhmat Grozny	Moscow
19:30 MSK (UTC+3)	Umyarov (yellow card) 55'	Report	Oleynikov (yellow card) 53'; Sheliya (yellow card) 90+'	Stadium: Lukoil Arena; Attendance: 12,086; Referee: Rafael Shafeev

2 September 2023 7	Ural Yekaterinburg	0 – 1	Akhmat Grozny	Yekaterinburg
13:00 MSK (UTC+3)		Report	Timofeyev (yellow card) 21'; Konaté 44' (pen.); Shvets (yellow card) 75'; Čeliković (yellow card) 80'	Stadium: Central Stadium; Attendance: 10,382; Referee: Alexey Amelin

16 September 2023 8	Akhmat Grozny	1 – 1	Krasnodar	Grozny
16:30 MSK (UTC+3)	Oleynikov 3'; Kamilov (yellow card) 73'; Semyonov (yellow card) 88'	Report	Kady 40'	Stadium: Akhmat-Arena; Attendance: 3,768; Referee: Vladimir Moskalyov

23 September 2023 9	Baltika Kaliningrad	1 – 0	Akhmat Grozny	Kaliningrad
16:30 MSK (UTC+3)	Kharin 43' (o.g.); Malyarov (yellow card) 51'	Report		Stadium: Kaliningrad Stadium; Attendance: 9,113; Referee: Pavel Shadykhanov

1 October 2023 10	Akhmat Grozny	1 – 1	Dynamo Moscow	Grozny
19:00 MSK (UTC+3)	Kovachev 21'; Berisha (yellow card) 40'; Todorović (yellow card) 40'; Shvets (yellow card) 43'; Kharin (yellow card) 90+'	Report	Fernández 51'; Dasa (yellow card) 73'	Stadium: Akhmat-Arena; Attendance: 4,695; Referee: Artyom Chistyakov

8 October 2023 11	Akhmat Grozny	0 – 1	Rubin Kazan	Grozny
19:00 MSK (UTC+3)	Konaté (yellow card) 59'; Bogosavac (yellow card) 87'; Camilo (yellow card) 90+'	Report	Čumić 34' (yellow card) 52'; Vada (yellow card) 87'	Stadium: Akhmat-Arena; Attendance: 5,104; Referee: Alexey Sukhoi

22 October 2023 12	Rostov	3 – 0	Akhmat Grozny	Rostov
19:00 MSK (UTC+3)	Golenkov 34'; Osipenko 41' (pen.); Mohebi 53'; Tugarev (yellow card) 86'	Report	Todorović (yellow card) 16'; Shvets (yellow card) 36'; Kharin (yellow card) 39'	Stadium: Rostov Arena; Attendance: 8,707; Referee: Kirill Levnikov

28 October 2023 13	Zenit St.Petersburg	2 – 1	Akhmat Grozny	Saint Petersburg
19:00 MSK (UTC+3)	Sergeyev 32'; Cassierra 37'; Alip (yellow card) 52'; Eraković (yellow card) 90+'	Report	Konaté 24'; Timofeyev (yellow card) 36'	Stadium: Krestovsky Stadium; Attendance: 17,967; Referee: Sergei Karasev

4 November 2023 14	Akhmat Grozny	1 – 2	Fakel Voronezh	Grozny
16:30 MSK (UTC+3)	Berisha (yellow card) 14'; Timofeyev (yellow card) 24'; Bogosavac (yellow card) 45+'; Todorović 45+'	Report	Yakimov (yellow card) 48' (goal) 90+'; Markov (yellow card) 52' (goal) 59'; Masternoy (yellow card) 71'	Stadium: Akhmat-Arena; Attendance: 4,712; Referee: Sergey Cheban

11 November 2023 15	Lokomotiv Moscow	2 – 1	Akhmat Grozny	Moscow
16:30 MSK (UTC+3)	Tiknizyan (yellow card) 35' (yellow-red card) 90+'; Dzyuba (yellow card) 68'; Mitaj (yellow card) 72'; Glushenkov 80'; Suleymanov 81'	Report	Shvets (yellow card) 4'; Ilyin (yellow card) 30'; Daniel Júnior (yellow card) 35'; Konaté 66' (pen.); Oleynikov (yellow card) 74'	Stadium: RZD Arena; Attendance: 5,306; Referee: Evgeniy Kukulyak

26 November 2023 16	Orenburg	1 – 1	Akhmat Grozny	Orenburg
12:00 MSK (UTC+3)	Florentín (yellow card) 32'; Pérez (yellow card) 36'; Obukhov (yellow card) 45+' (goal) 50'; Kenyaykin (yellow card) 65'; Vorobyov (yellow card) 66'	Report	Berisha (yellow card) 39'; Agalarov (yellow card) 52' (goal) 65' (pen.); Camilo (yellow card) 67'; Utsiyev (yellow card) 77'; Kharin (yellow card) 81'	Stadium: Gazovik Stadium; Attendance: 2,420; Referee: Artyom Lyubimov

3 December 2023 17	Akhmat Grozny	2 – 1	Spartak Moscow	Grozny
19:00 MSK (UTC+3)	Timofeyev (yellow card) 12'; Agalarov 35'; Berisha (yellow card) 36'; Kovachev 47'; Utsiyev (yellow card) 90+'	Report	Ignatov (yellow card) 27'; Zinkovsky 44'; Litvinov (yellow card) 62'	Stadium: Akhmat-Arena; Attendance: 4,643; Referee: Evgeniy Kukulyak

9 December 2023 18	Akhmat Grozny	0 – 0	Rostov	Grozny
16:30 MSK (UTC+3)	Agalarov (yellow card) 45+'; Camilo (yellow card) 65'; Agalarov (yellow card) 45+'; Shvets (yellow card) 90+'	Report	Vakhaniya (yellow card) 61'; Utkin (yellow card) 64'; Prokhin (yellow card) 90+'; Langovich (red card) 90+'	Stadium: Akhmat-Arena; Attendance: 5,091; Referee: Yan Bobrovsky

2 March 2024 19	Akhmat Grozny	1 – 0	Ural Yekaterinburg	Grozny
19:00 MSK (UTC+3)	Semyonov 73' (yellow card) 89'; Todorović (yellow card) 81'	Report	Begić (yellow card) 10'; Bocherov (yellow card) 37'	Stadium: Akhmat-Arena; Attendance: 5,819; Referee: Artyom Chistyakov

9 March 2024 20	Dynamo Moscow	2 – 0	Akhmat Grozny	Moscow
19:00 MSK (UTC+3)	Chávez 39'; Marichal (yellow card) 57'; Tyukavin 62'	Report	Kharin (yellow card) 41' (yellow-red card) 45+'; Ghandri (yellow card) 56'	Stadium: VTB Arena; Attendance: 7,862; Referee: Evgeniy Bulanov

31 March 2024 22	Rubin Kazan	2 – 1	Akhmat Grozny	Kazan
16:30 MSK (UTC+3)	Ranđelović 12'; Daku 35' (yellow card) 66'; Ashurmatov (yellow card) 90+4'	Report	Timofeyev (yellow card) 25'; Lovat 90+3'	Stadium: Ak Bars Arena; Attendance: 5,024; Referee: Vitali Meshkov

7 April 2024 23	Akhmat Grozny	0 – 2	Lokomotiv Moscow	Grozny
16:30 MSK (UTC+3)	Shvets (yellow card) 16'; Todorović (red card) 19'; Camilo (yellow card) 88'	Report	Miranchuk 21' (pen.); Pinyayev 58'; Morozov (yellow card) 85'	Stadium: Akhmat-Arena; Attendance: 3,836; Referee: Vasily Kazartsev

13 April 2024 24	Akhmat Grozny	1 – 7	Baltika Kaliningrad	Grozny
16:30 MSK (UTC+3)	Timofeyev (yellow card) 13'; Kamilov (yellow card) 68'; Kovachev 75'	Report	Henríquez 4'; Fernandes 7', 41', 84'; Kavalyow 10'; Lisakovich 34'; Luna (yellow card) 86'; Kuzmin 89'	Stadium: Akhmat-Arena; Attendance: 4,416; Referee: Vladimir Moskalyov

20 April 2024 25	CSKA Moscow	1 – 2	Akhmat Grozny	Moscow
19:30 MSK (UTC+3)	Fayzullaev (yellow card) 7'; Willyan (red card) 19'; Diveyev (yellow card) 44' (red card) 89'; Moisés (yellow card) 56'; Chalov 63' (pen.)	Report	Camilo (yellow card) 33'; Semyonov (yellow card) 39'; Kovachev (yellow card) 67'; Konaté 79'; Berisha 87'	Stadium: VEB Arena; Attendance: 6,980; Referee: Rafael Shafeev

25 April 2024 21	Akhmat Grozny	1 – 0	Sochi	Grozny
20:30 MSK (UTC+3)	Sadulayev 30'; Kamilov (yellow card) 44'; Berisha (yellow card) 85'	Report	Saavedra (yellow card) 26'	Stadium: Akhmat-Arena; Attendance: 5,790; Referee: Sergey Ivanov

28 April 2024 26	Akhmat Grozny	5 – 1	Pari Nizhny Novgorod	Grozny
14:00 MSK (UTC+3)	Lovat (yellow card) 22'; Konaté 25', 53'; Kamilov 45+'; Berisha (yellow card) 62'; Šatara 65'; Sadulayev 87'	Report	Zhivoglyadov (yellow card) 36'; Kutateladze 42'; Bozhenov (yellow card) 45+' (yellow-red card) 55'; Troshechkin (yellow card) 64'; Kakkoyev (yellow card) 90+'	Stadium: Akhmat-Arena; Attendance: 4,480; Referee: Vladislav Bezborodov

4 May 2024 27	Krasnodar	0 – 1	Akhmat Grozny	Krasnodar
19:30 MSK (UTC+3)	Krivtsov (yellow card) 90+'; Alonso (yellow card) 90+'	Report	Kovachev (yellow card) 19'; Konaté 46'; Šatara (yellow card) 90+'	Stadium: Krasnodar Stadium; Attendance: 22,021; Referee: Vitali Meshkov

10 May 2024 28	Krylia Sovetov	0 – 2	Akhmat Grozny	Samara
16:00 MSK (UTC+3)	Babkin (yellow card) 22'	Report	Konaté 45+1'; Berisha 62'	Stadium: Solidarnost Arena; Attendance: 7,382; Referee: Kirill Levnikov

19 May 2024 29	Akhmat Grozny	1 – 5	Zenit St.Petersburg	Grozny
19:00 MSK (UTC+3)	Konaté 13'; Šatara (yellow card) 25'; Timofeyev (yellow card) 77'; Oleynikov (yellow card) 87'	Report	Cassierra 4', 9', 44', 47', 51'; Kovalenko (yellow card) 74'	Stadium: Akhmat-Arena; Attendance: 5,843; Referee: Sergei Karasev

25 May 2024 30	Fakel Voronezh	2 – 0	Akhmat Grozny	Voronezh
16:30 MSK (UTC+3)	Bozhin 6'; Markov 54'	Report		Stadium: Tsentralnyi Profsoyuz Stadion; Attendance: 14,018; Referee: Artyom Chistyakov

==== League table ====
Pos	Team	Pld	W	D	L	GF	GA	GD	Pts
8	Rubin Kazan	30	11	9	10	31	38	−7	42
9	Krylia Sovetov Samara	30	11	8	11	46	44	+2	41
10	Akhmat Grozny	30	10	5	15	33	45	−12	35
11	Fakel Voronezh	30	7	11	12	22	31	−9	32
12	Orenburg	30	7	10	13	34	41	−7	31

Source: Premier Liga
Rules for classification: 1) Points; 2) Head-to-head points; 3) Head-to-head matches won; 4) Head-to-head goal difference; 5) Head-to-head goals scored; 6) Matches won; 7) Goal difference; 8) Goals scored; 9) 2022–23 position (not applicable to final standings); 10) Play-off. Note: if teams tied on points played an equal number of head-to-head games, head-to-head results are considered in aggregate, in a separate 'table'. If teams tied on points played a different number of head-to-head games, head-to-head criteria are considered in one-on-one pairs for each team against each other, then the teams are ordered by the number of one-on-one matchups they have advantage in.

=== Russian Cup ===
==== Group stage ====
Pos	Team	Pld	W	PW	PL	L	GF	GA	GD	Pts	Qualification
1	Zenit Saint Petersburg	6	4	1	0	1	9	5	+4	14	Qualification to the Knockout phase (RPL path)
2	Baltika Kaliningrad	6	4	0	0	2	12	7	+5	12	Qualification to the Knockout phase (RPL path)
3	Akhmat Grozny	6	2	0	1	3	10	12	−2	7	Qualification to the Knockout phase (regions path)
4	Krylia Sovetov Samara	6	1	0	0	5	5	12	−7	3	

Source: Russian Football Union (in Russian), Soccerway
Rules for classification: 1) Points; 2) Head-to-head points; 3) Head-to-head matches won; 4) Head-to-head goal difference; 5) Head-to-head goals scored; 6) Matches won; 7) Goal difference; 8) Goals scored; 9) Penalty shoot-out goal difference; 10) Draw.

25 July 2023 1	Zenit St.Petersburg	2 – 0	Akhmat Grozny	Saint Petersburg
20:45 MSK (UTC+3)	Mantuan 39'; Queiroz (yellow card) 59'; Claudinho 80'; Vasilyev (yellow card) 89'	Report	Todorović (yellow card) 30'	Stadium: Gazprom Arena; Attendance: 29,664; Referee: Sergey Tsyganok

10 August 2023 2	Akhmat Grozny	0 – 2	Baltika Kaliningrad	Grozny
20:00 MSK (UTC+3)	Timofeyev (yellow card) 65'	Report	Semyonov 44' (o.g.); Lameira (yellow card) 52'; Barkov 63'; Osipov (yellow card) 83'	Stadium: Akhmat Arena; Attendance: 3,567; Referee: Artur Fyodorov

30 August 2023 3	Akhmat Grozny	3 – 1	Krylia Sovetov Samara	Grozny
17:15 MSK (UTC+3)	Konaté 44'; Čeliković 53' (yellow card) 90'; Berisha (yellow card) 80'; Oleynikov 90+4'	Report	Bijl 51'; Yevgenyev (yellow card) 63'	Stadium: Akhmat Arena; Attendance: 6,231; Referee: Pavel Shadykhanov

20 September 2023 4	Akhmat Grozny	3 – 3 (2 – 4 p)	Zenit St.Petersburg	Grozny
17:15 MSK (UTC+3)	Kovachev 4'; Oleynikov 14'; Utsiyev (yellow card) 51'; Ilyin 69'; Bystrov (red card) 90+2'	Report	Sergeyev 27', 33'; Cassierra 42'; Krugovoy (yellow card) 90+4'	Stadium: Akhmat Arena; Attendance: 13,383; Referee: Roman Galimov
	Penalties
	Ilyin (penalty missed); Todorović (penalty scored); Kharin (penalty scored); Júnior (penalty missed)		(penalty scored) Cassierra; (penalty scored) Isidor; (penalty missed) Queiroz; (penalty scored) Renan; (penalty scored) Claudinho

4 October 2023 5	Krylia Sovetov Samara	0 – 3	Akhmat Grozny	Samara
12:30 MSK (UTC+3)	Zotov (yellow card) 21'; Yezhov (yellow card) 24'	Report	Ilyin 2'; Konaté 8'; Júnior (yellow card) 27'; Semyonov 66'	Stadium: Solidarnost Samara Arena; Attendance: 8,032; Referee: Yevgeni Kukulyak

31 October 2023 6	Baltika Kaliningrad	4 – 1	Akhmat Grozny	Kaliningrad
20:30 MSK (UTC+3)	Henríquez 45'; Musayev 48', 79'; Gassama (yellow card) 60'; Fernández (yellow card) 69'; Guzina 90+3'	Report	Shvets 33'; Kamilov (yellow card) 49'; Agalarov (yellow card) 60'; Volkov (yellow card) 60'	Stadium: Rostec Arena; Attendance: 7,112; Referee: Artyom Lyubimov

==== Knockout stage ====
13 March 2024 Regions path Quarter-finals Stage 1	Volgar Astrakhan	1 – 2	Akhmat Grozny	Astrakhan
15:30 MSK (UTC+3)	Obivalin (yellow card) 44'; Lesnikov (yellow card) 50'; Smirnov (yellow card) 66'; Zhamaletdinov 73'; Krotov (yellow card) 76'; Anisimov (yellow card) 89'; Zuyev (yellow card) 90'	Report	Šatara (yellow card) 14'; Oleynikov 21'; Lovat (yellow card) 47'; Ilyin 58'; Ghandri (yellow card) 61'; Oparin (yellow card) 89'	Stadium: Central Stadium; Attendance: 4,876; Referee: Rafael Shafeev

4 April 2024 Regions path Quarter-finals Stage 2	Akhmat Grozny	0 – 1	Orenburg	Grozny
19:00 MSK (UTC+3)	Shvets (yellow card) 26'; Todorović (yellow card) 89'	Report	Stolbov (yellow card) 82'; Šatara 88' (o.g.)	Stadium: Akhmat-Arena; Attendance: 3,671; Referee: Artyom Chistyakov

== Squad statistics ==
As of match played 25 May 2024

=== Appearances and goals ===
No.	Pos	Nat	Player	Total		Premier League		Russian Cup	
No.	Pos	Nat	Player	Apps	Goals	Apps	Goals	Apps	Goals
1	GK	(Russia) RUS	Mikhail Oparin	11	0	5+1	0	5	0
4	DF	(Russia) RUS	Turpal-Ali Ibishev	3	0	2+1	0	0	0
5	DF	(Bosnia and Herzegovina) BIH	Miloš Šatara	9	1	7	1	2	0
6	DF	(Bosnia and Herzegovina) BIH	Jasmin Čeliković	29	1	22	0	6+1	1
7	MF	(Kosovo) KOS	Bernard Berisha	32	3	19+7	3	4+2	0
8	DF	(Serbia) SRB	Miroslav Bogosavac	32	0	23+4	0	2+3	0
9	FW	(Russia) RUS	Gamid Agalarov	23	3	5+14	3	2+2	0
10	MF	(Russia) RUS	Lechi Sadulayev	15	2	9+5	2	0+1	0
13	FW	(Burkina Faso) BFA	Mohamed Konaté	35	13	21+8	11	4+2	2
15	DF	(Russia) RUS	Andrei Semyonov	21	2	18	1	3	1
16	MF	(Brazil) BRA	Camilo	29	1	18+7	1	3+1	0
18	MF	(Russia) RUS	Vladislav Kamilov	27	1	11+9	1	7	0
21	MF	(Russia) RUS	Ivan Oleynikov	35	4	20+7	1	2+6	3
23	MF	(Russia) RUS	Anton Shvets	22	1	9+9	0	3+1	1
24	MF	(Montenegro) MNE	Zaim Divanović	9	0	1+5	0	3	0
29	FW	(Russia) RUS	Vladimir Ilyin	28	5	18+2	2	5+3	3
33	MF	(Russia) RUS	Minkail Matsuyev	2	0	0	0	0+2	0
36	DF	(Brazil) BRA	Lucas Lovat	13	1	6+5	1	2	0
40	DF	(Russia) RUS	Rizvan Utsiyev	16	0	3+6	0	7	0
47	FW	(Ivory Coast) CIV	Néné Gbamblé	10	0	0+6	0	3+1	0
55	DF	(Bosnia and Herzegovina) BIH	Darko Todorović	35	1	27+1	1	3+4	0
59	DF	(Russia) RUS	Yevgeni Kharin	21	0	10+6	0	4+1	0
71	MF	(Russia) RUS	Magomed Yakuyev	1	0	0+1	0	0	0
75	DF	(Tunisia) TUN	Nader Ghandri	13	0	12	0	1	0
88	GK	(Russia) RUS	Giorgi Sheliya	28	0	25	0	3	0
94	MF	(Russia) RUS	Artyom Timofeyev	30	2	24+2	2	1+3	0
98	MF	(Bulgaria) BUL	Svetoslav Kovachev	31	4	12+12	3	6+1	1
Players away from the club on loan:
3	DF	(Russia) RUS	Vladislav Volkov	6	0	0+3	0	2+1	0
Players who appeared for Akhmat Grozny but left during the season:
11	MF	(Brazil) BRA	Daniel Júnior	7	0	1+3	0	2+1	0
19	DF	(Kazakhstan) KAZ	Marat Bystrov	7	0	2+1	0	4	0
48	MF	(Russia) RUS	Mikail Akhmedov	1	0	0	0	0+1	0

=== Goal scorers ===
Place	Position	Nation	Number	Name	Premier League	Russian Cup	Total
1	FW	(Burkina Faso)	13	Mohamed Konaté	11	2	13
2	FW	(Russia)	29	Vladimir Ilyin	2	3	5
3	MF	(Bulgaria)	98	Svetoslav Kovachev	3	1	4
3	MF	(Russia)	21	Ivan Oleynikov	1	3	4
5	FW	(Russia)	9	Gamid Agalarov	3	0	3
5	MF	(Kosovo)	7	Bernard Berisha	3	0	3
7	MF	(Russia)	94	Artyom Timofeyev	2	0	2
7	MF	(Russia)	10	Lechi Sadulayev	2	0	2
7	DF	(Russia)	15	Andrei Semyonov	1	1	2
10	DF	(Bosnia and Herzegovina)	55	Darko Todorović	1	0	1
10	MF	(Brazil)	16	Camilo	1	0	1
10	DF	(Brazil)	36	Lucas Lovat	1	0	1
10	MF	(Russia)	18	Vladislav Kamilov	1	0	1
10	DF	(Bosnia and Herzegovina)	5	Miloš Šatara	1	0	1
10	DF	(Bosnia and Herzegovina)	6	Jasmin Čeliković	0	1	1
10	MF	(Russia)	23	Anton Shvets	0	1	1
Total					33	12	45

=== Clean sheets ===
Place	Position	Nation	Number	Name	Premier League	Russian Cup	Total
1	GK	(Russia)	88	Giorgi Sheliya	8	0	8
2	GK	(Russia)	1	Mikhail Oparin	1	1	2
Total					8	1	9

Giorgi Sheliya & Mikhail Oparin both played in Akhmat's 0-0 draw with Rostov on 9 December 2023

=== Disciplinary record ===
Number	Nation	Position	Name	Premier League		Russian Cup		Total	
Number	Nation	Position	Name	Booked	Sent off (straight red)	Booked	Sent off (straight red)	Booked	Sent off (straight red)
1	(Russia)	GK	Mikhail Oparin	0	0	1	0	1	0
5	(Bosnia and Herzegovina)	DF	Miloš Šatara	2	0	1	0	3	0
6	(Bosnia and Herzegovina)	DF	Jasmin Čeliković	3	0	1	0	4	0
7	(Kosovo)	MF	Bernard Berisha	6	0	1	0	7	0
8	(Serbia)	DF	Miroslav Bogosavac	3	0	0	0	3	0
9	(Russia)	FW	Gamid Agalarov	2	0	1	0	3	0
13	(Burkina Faso)	FW	Mohamed Konaté	1	0	0	0	1	0
15	(Russia)	DF	Andrei Semyonov	6	1	0	0	6	1
16	(Brazil)	MF	Camilo	5	0	0	0	5	0
18	(Russia)	MF	Vladislav Kamilov	5	0	1	0	6	0
21	(Russia)	MF	Ivan Oleynikov	3	0	0	0	3	0
23	(Russia)	MF	Anton Shvets	6	0	1	0	7	0
29	(Russia)	FW	Vladimir Ilyin	2	0	0	0	2	0
36	(Brazil)	DF	Lucas Lovat	1	0	1	0	2	0
40	(Russia)	DF	Rizvan Utsiyev	2	0	1	0	3	0
55	(Bosnia and Herzegovina)	DF	Darko Todorović	3	1	2	0	5	1
59	(Russia)	DF	Yevgeni Kharin	6	1	0	0	6	1
75	(Tunisia)	DF	Nader Ghandri	1	0	1	0	2	0
88	(Russia)	GK	Giorgi Sheliya	2	0	0	0	2	0
94	(Russia)	MF	Artyom Timofeyev	8	0	1	0	9	0
98	(Bulgaria)	MF	Svetoslav Kovachev	2	0	0	0	2	0
Players away on loan:
3	(Russia)	DF	Vladislav Volkov	1	0	1	0	2	0
Players who left Akhmat Grozny during the season:
11	(Brazil)	MF	Daniel Júnior	1	0	1	0	2	0
19	(Kazakhstan)	DF	Marat Bystrov	0	1	0	1	0	2
Total				71	4	15	1	86	5
