= 2024–25 FC Akhmat Grozny season =

FC Akhmat Grozny
2024–25 season
- Chairman: Magomed Daudov
- Manager: Magomed Adiyev (until 1 September); Sergei Tashuyev (3 September-28 May); Fyodor Shcherbachenko (Caretaker) (from 28 May)
- Stadium: Akhmat-Arena
- Premier League: 14th
- Relegation play-offs: Winners
- Russian Cup: Regions path Semi-finals Stage 1
- Top goalscorer: League: Maksim Samorodov (6); All: Maksim Samorodov (8)
- Highest home attendance: 6,723 vs Krasnodar (2 October 2024)
- Lowest home attendance: 1,706 vs Spartak Moscow (30 March 2025)
- Average home league attendance: 4,450 (18 May 2025)
| Home colours | Away colours |

The 2024–25 season was the 79th season in the history of FC Akhmat Grozny, and the club's 13th consecutive season in the Russian Premier League. In addition to the domestic league, the team is participated in the Russian Cup.

== Season events ==
On 20 June, Arsen Adamov joined Akhmat on a season-long loan deal from Zenit St.Petersburg.

On 26 June, Akhmat announced the signing of free-agent Aleksandr Zhirov to a one-year contract, with the option of an additional year.

On 18 July, Akhmat announced the signing of Mauro Luna Diale from Unión de Santa Fe to a four-year contract.

On 25 July, Akhmat announced the signing of Felippe Cardoso from Casa Pia to a four-year contract.

On 29 July, Akhmat announced the return of Ismael Silva on a one-year contract, with the option of a second year.

On 5 August, Akhmat announced the signing of Maksim Samorodov from Aktobe to a four-year contract.

On 23 August, Akhmat announced that they had extended their contract with Miroslav Bogosavac until the summer of 2027.

On 1 September, Akhmat announced that Magomed Adiyev had left his role as head coach by mutual consent.

On 3 September, Akhmat announced Sergei Tashuyev as their new head coach.

On 11 September, Akhmat announced the loan signing of Daniil Utkin from Rostov until the end of the season.

On 9 January, Goiás announced the signing of Lucas Lovat on a year-long loan deal.

On 15 January, Akhmat announced the signing of Vadim Ulyanov to a six-month contract, with the option of an additional three seasons.

On 30 January, Akhmat announced the signing of Georgi Melkadze from Kolkheti-1913 Poti on a contract until the summer of 2027, and the signing of Rodrigo Ruiz Díaz from 2 de Mayo on a contract until the end of the season with the option to extend for an additionally three-years. The following day, 31 January, Felippe Cardoso left Akhmat to join Henan for their 2025 season.

On 19 February, Akhmat announced the signing of Leo Goglichidze from Ural Yekaterinburg until the end of the season, with the option of extending their contract for an additional two years. The following day, 20 February, Akhmat announced the signing of Daniil Zorin on loan from Spartak Moscow for the remainder of the season.

On 28 May, Sergei Tashuyev resigned after Akhmat lost the first leg of the 2024–25 Russian Premier League relegation play-offs, with Fyodor Shcherbachenko being placed in temporary charge.

== Squad ==
As of match played 31 May 2025

| No. | Name | Nationality | Position | Date of birth (age) | Signed from | Signed in | Contract ends | Apps. | Goals |
Goalkeepers
| 1 | Vadim Ulyanov | (Russia) | GK | 7 October 2001 (aged 23) | Unattached | 2025 | 2025 (+3) | 5 | 0 |
| 35 | Rizvan Tashayev | (Russia) | GK | 5 October 2003 (aged 21) | Academy | 2022 | | 1 | 0 |
| 72 | Yakhya Magomedov | (Russia) | GK | 6 April 2007 (aged 18) | Academy | 2024 | | 1 | 0 |
| 88 | Giorgi Sheliya | (Russia) | GK | 11 December 1988 (aged 36) | Tambov | 2020 | | 125 | 0 |
Defenders
| 2 | Aleksandr Zhirov | (Russia) | DF | 24 January 1991 (aged 34) | Unattached | 2024 | 2025 (+1) | 28 | 2 |
| 3 | Leo Goglichidze | (Russia) | DF | 29 April 1997 (aged 28) | Ural Yekaterinburg | 2025 | 2025 (+2) | 7 | 0 |
| 4 | Turpal-Ali Ibishev | (Russia) | DF | 18 February 2002 (aged 23) | Academy | 2021 | | 32 | 0 |
| 5 | Miloš Šatara | (Bosnia and Herzegovina) | DF | 28 October 1995 (aged 29) | Shakhtyor Soligorsk | 2023 | | 40 | 1 |
| 8 | Miroslav Bogosavac | (Serbia) | DF | 14 October 1996 (aged 28) | Čukarički | 2020 | 2027 | 143 | 0 |
| 32 | Ilias Gaibov | (Russia) | DF | 8 June 2005 (aged 19) | Academy | 2025 | | 1 | 0 |
| 40 | Rizvan Utsiyev | (Russia) | DF | 7 February 1988 (aged 37) | Trainee | 2005 | | 321 | 8 |
| 55 | Darko Todorović | (Bosnia and Herzegovina) | DF | 5 May 1997 (aged 28) | Red Bull Salzburg | 2022 | | 102 | 2 |
| 59 | Yevgeni Kharin | (Russia) | DF | 11 June 1995 (aged 29) | Levadia Tallinn | 2018 | | 143 | 11 |
| 75 | Nader Ghandri | (Tunisia) | DF | 18 February 1995 (aged 30) | Ajman | 2024 | 2026 | 41 | 4 |
| 95 | Arsen Adamov | (Russia) | DF | 20 October 1999 (aged 25) | on loan from Zenit St.Petersburg | 2024 | 2025 | 42 | 1 |
Midfielders
| 7 | Bernard Berisha | (Kosovo) | MF | 24 October 1991 (aged 33) | Anzhi Makhachkala | 2016 | | 198 | 28 |
| 10 | Lechi Sadulayev | (Russia) | MF | 8 January 2000 (aged 25) | Academy | 2018 | | 124 | 12 |
| 11 | Ismael Silva | (Brazil) | MF | 1 December 1994 (aged 30) | Unattached | 2024 | 2025 (+1) | 147 | 7 |
| 13 | Minkail Matsuyev | (Russia) | MF | 3 February 2000 (aged 25) | Unattached | 2023 | | 5 | 0 |
| 14 | Amine Talal | (Morocco) | MF | 5 June 1996 (aged 28) | Sheriff Tiraspol | 2024 | | 26 | 3 |
| 18 | Vladislav Kamilov | (Russia) | MF | 29 August 1995 (aged 29) | Ufa | 2022 | | 87 | 5 |
| 19 | Mauro Luna Diale | (Argentina) | MF | 26 April 1999 (aged 26) | Unión de Santa Fe | 2024 | 2028 | 23 | 1 |
| 23 | Anton Shvets | (Russia) | MF | 26 April 1993 (aged 32) | Villarreal B | 2017 | | 187 | 12 |
| 24 | Zaim Divanović | (Montenegro) | MF | 9 December 2000 (aged 24) | Shakhtyor Soligorsk | 2023 | | 29 | 0 |
| 28 | Daniil Zorin | (Russia) | MF | 22 February 2004 (aged 21) | on loan from Spartak Moscow | 2025 | 2025 | 14 | 2 |
| 47 | Daniil Utkin | (Russia) | MF | 12 October 1999 (aged 25) | on loan from Rostov | 2024 | 2025 | 50 | 11 |
| 71 | Magomed Yakuyev | (Russia) | MF | 7 June 2004 (aged 20) | Academy | 2022 | | 9 | 0 |
Forwards
| 9 | Rodrigo Ruiz Díaz | (Paraguay) | FW | 15 January 1999 (aged 26) | 2 de Mayo | 2025 | 2025 (+3) | 14 | 1 |
| 20 | Maksim Samorodov | (Kazakhstan) | FW | 29 June 2002 (aged 22) | Aktobe | 2024 | 2028 | 32 | 8 |
| 77 | Georgi Melkadze | (Russia) | FW | 4 April 1997 (aged 28) | Kolkheti-1913 Poti | 2025 | 2027 | 39 | 7 |
Away on loan
| 6 | Jasmin Čeliković | (Bosnia and Herzegovina) | DF | 7 January 1999 (aged 26) | Tuzla City | 2023 | | 29 | 1 |
| 30 | Felippe Cardoso | (Brazil) | FW | 4 October 1998 (aged 26) | Casa Pia | 2024 | 2028 | 17 | 2 |
| 36 | Lucas Lovat | (Brazil) | DF | 15 January 1997 (aged 28) | Slovan Bratislava | 2024 | 2027 | 26 | 3 |
| 98 | Svetoslav Kovachev | (Bulgaria) | MF | 14 March 1998 (aged 27) | Arda Kardzhali | 2024 | | 47 | 5 |
Players that left Akhmat Grozny during the season
| 1 | Mikhail Oparin | (Russia) | GK | 22 May 1993 (aged 32) | Yenisey Krasnoyarsk | 2022 | | 23 | 0 |
| 3 | Vladislav Volkov | (Russia) | DF | 18 May 2000 (aged 25) | Chayka Peschanokopskoye | 2023 | | 6 | 0 |
| 9 | Gamid Agalarov | (Russia) | FW | 16 July 2000 (aged 24) | Ufa | 2022 | 2025 | 56 | 9 |
| 15 | Camilo | (Brazil) | MF | 23 February 1999 (aged 26) | Olympique Lyonnais | 2023 | | 50 | 1 |
| 21 | Ivan Oleynikov | (Russia) | MF | 24 August 1998 (aged 26) | Chayka Peschanokopskoye | 2022 | | 67 | 9 |

== Transfers ==
=== In ===
| Date | Position | Nationality | Name | From | Fee | Ref. |
|---|---|---|---|---|---|---|
| 26 June 2024 | DF | (Russia) | Aleksandr Zhirov | Unattached | Free | |
| 1 July 2024 | DF | (Bosnia and Herzegovina) | Jasmin Čeliković | Tuzla City | Undisclosed | |
| 1 July 2024 | MF | (Bulgaria) | Svetoslav Kovachev | Arda Kardzhali | Undisclosed | |
| 18 July 2024 | MF | (Argentina) | Mauro Luna Diale | Unión de Santa Fe | Undisclosed | |
| 25 July 2024 | FW | (Brazil) | Felippe Cardoso | Casa Pia | Undisclosed | |
| 29 July 2024 | MF | (Brazil) | Ismael Silva | Unattached | Free | |
| 5 August 2024 | FW | (Kazakhstan) | Maksim Samorodov | Aktobe | Undisclosed | |
| 15 January 2025 | GK | (Russia) | Vadim Ulyanov | Unattached | Free | |
| 15 January 2025 | FW | (Russia) | Georgi Melkadze | Kolkheti-1913 Poti | Undisclosed | |
| 15 January 2025 | FW | (Paraguay) | Rodrigo Ruiz Díaz | 2 de Mayo | Undisclosed | |
| 19 February 2025 | DF | (Russia) | Leo Goglichidze | Ural Yekaterinburg | Undisclosed | |

=== Loans in ===
| Date from | Position | Nationality | Name | From | Date to | Ref. |
|---|---|---|---|---|---|---|
| 20 June 2024 | DF | (Russia) | Arsen Adamov | Zenit St.Petersburg | End of season | |
| 11 September 2024 | MF | (Russia) | Daniil Utkin | Rostov | End of season | |
| 20 February 2025 | MF | (Russia) | Daniil Zorin | Spartak Moscow | Undisclosed | |

=== Out ===
| Date | Position | Nationality | Name | To | Fee | Ref. |
|---|---|---|---|---|---|---|
| 1 June 2024 | FW | (Ivory Coast) | Néné Gbamblé | Torpedo Moscow | Undisclosed | |
| 5 August 2024 | MF | (Russia) | Ivan Oleynikov | Krylia Sovetov | Undisclosed | |
| 21 August 2024 | FW | (Russia) | Gamid Agalarov | Dynamo Makhachkala | Undisclosed | |
| 11 February 2025 | MF | (Brazil) | Camilo | Grêmio | Undisclosed | |
| 13 February 2025 | GK | (Russia) | Mikhail Oparin | Shinnik Yaroslavl | Undisclosed | |

=== Loans out ===
| Date from | Position | Nationality | Name | To | Date to | Ref. |
|---|---|---|---|---|---|---|
| 27 July 2024 | GK | (Russia) | Rizvan Tashayev | Sokol Kazan | 31 December 2024 | |
| 28 July 2024 | DF | (Bosnia and Herzegovina) | Jasmin Čeliković | Panetolikos | End of season | |
| 9 January 2025 | DF | (Brazil) | Lucas Lovat | Goiás | 31 December 2025 | |
| 31 January 2025 | FW | (Brazil) | Felippe Cardoso | Henan | 31 December 2025 | |
| 21 February 2025 | MF | (Bulgaria) | Svetoslav Kovachev | Arda Kardzhali | Undisclosed | |

=== Released ===
| Date | Position | Nationality | Name | Joined | Date | Ref. |
|---|---|---|---|---|---|---|
| 4 July 2024 | MF | (Russia) | Artyom Timofeyev | Lokomotiv Moscow | 4 July 2024 | |
| 8 February 2025 | DF | (Russia) | Vladislav Volkov | Volgar Astrakhan | 8 February 2025 | |

== Friendlies ==
| 30 June 2024 | Dynamo Moscow | 0–3 | Akhmat Grozny | Khimki |
| 17:00 MSK (UTC+3) | | Report | Agalarov 43'; Balakhonov 50' (o.g.); Berisha 65' | Stadium: UTB-Novogorsk-Dynamo |

| 3 July 2024 | Akhmat Grozny | 1–1 | Chelyabinsk | Khimki |
| 11:00 MSK (UTC+3) | Kovachev 31' | Report | Samsonov 4' | Stadium: UTB-Novogorsk-Dynamo |

| 10 July 2024 | Akhmat Grozny | 2–0 | Irtysh Omsk | Khimki |
| 15:45 MSK (UTC+3) | Kovachev 14'; Agalarov 19' | Report | | Stadium: UTB-Novogorsk-Dynamo |

| 13 July 2024 | CSKA Moscow | 2–2 | Akhmat Grozny | Moscow |
| 19:30 MSK (UTC+3) | Willyan 28'; Ryadno (yellow card) 59'; Chalov 79' | Report | Ghandri 12'; Kovachev 39' | Stadium: VEB Arena |

| 9 September 2024 | Akhmat Grozny | 2–2 | Dynamo Makhachkala | Grozny |
| 17:00 MSK (UTC+3) | Diale 39'; Divanović 72' (pen.) | Report | A.Gadzhiyev 3'; Serderov 66' | Stadium: Akhmat-Arena |

| 16 January 2025 | Akhmat Grozny | 5–3 | Novi Pazar | Kadriye, Turkey |
| 17:30 MSK (UTC+3) | Utkin 5'; Melkadze 26', 56', 60'; Kovachev 70' | Report | Kovačević 15', 48'; Filimonovic 90+2' |

| 21 January 2025 | Akhmat Grozny | 1–0 | Vojvodina | Kadriye, Turkey |
| 16:30 MSK (UTC+3) | Ghandri 84' (pen.) | Report |

| 22 January 2025 | Akhmat Grozny | v | Slavia Sofia | Kadriye, Turkey |
| 16:00 MSK (UTC+3) | | Report |

| 31 January 2025 | Akhmat Grozny | 3–0 | Septemvri Sofia | Belek, Turkey |
| 17:00 MSK (UTC+3) | Samorodov 37'; Sadulayev 39' (pen.); Ghandri 53' (pen.) | Report |

| 3 February 2025 | Akhmat Grozny | 3–1 | Arsenal Tula | Belek, Turkey |
| 17:30 MSK (UTC+3) | Luna Diale 45'; Ghandri 72'; Kamilov 84' | Report | Geloyan 66' |

| 4 February 2025 | Akhmat Grozny | 3–0 | Grafičar Beograd | Belek, Turkey |
| 17:00 MSK (UTC+3) | Talal 1'; Zhirov 22'; Divanović 59' | Report |

| 8 February 2025 | Akhmat Grozny | 2–0 | Yenisey Krasnoyarsk | Belek, Turkey |
| 17:00 MSK (UTC+3) | Ghandri (red card) 47'; Melkadze 61'; Yakuyev 83' | Report |

| 9 February 2025 | Akhmat Grozny | 4–0 | Kyzylzhar | Belek, Turkey |
| 16:00 MSK (UTC+3) | Zhirov 61'; Díaz 67'; Šatara 79'; Kharin 81' | Report |

| 16 February 2025 | Akhmat Grozny | 1–0 | Dynamo Makhachkala | Belek, Turkey |
| 17:15 MSK (UTC+3) | Melkadze 67' | Report |

| 17 February 2025 | Akhmat Grozny | 0–1 | Aktobe | Belek, Turkey |
| 17:30 MSK (UTC+3) | | Report | Kenzhegulov 50' |

| 22 February 2025 | Akhmat Grozny | 2–0 | Sogdiana | Belek, Turkey |
| 17:00 MSK (UTC+3) | 35'; 78' | Report |

| 23 February 2025 | Akhmat Grozny | 1–0 | Baltika Kaliningrad | Belek, Turkey |
| 11:00 MSK (UTC+3) | Melkadze 15' (pen.) | Report |

| 23 March 2025 | Akhmat Grozny | 1–2 | Dynamo Makhachkala | Grozny |
| MSK (UTC+3) | Ruiz Díaz 59' | Report | Agalarov 44'; Serderov 79' | Stadium: Akhmat-Arena |

== Competitions ==
=== Overall record ===
| Competition | First match | Last match | Starting round | Final position | Record | | | | | | | |
| Competition | First match | Last match | Starting round | Final position | Pld | W | D | L | GF | GA | GD | Win % |
|---|---|---|---|---|---|---|---|---|---|---|---|---|
| Premier League | 21 July 2024 | 24 May 2025 | Matchday 1 | 14th | 30 | 4 | 13 | 13 | 27 | 48 | −21 | 13.33 |
| Relegation play-offs | 28 May 2025 | 31 May 2025 | 1st leg | Winners | 2 | 1 | 0 | 1 | 3 | 2 | +1 | 50.00 |
| Russian Cup | 31 July 2024 | 15 April 2025 | Group stage | Regions path Semi-finals Stage 1 | 4 | 4 | 0 | 0 | 0 | 0 | +0 | 100.00 |
| Total | | | | | 36 | 9 | 13 | 14 | 30 | 50 | −20 | 25.00 |

Last updated: 31 May 2025
Source: Soccerway

=== Premier League ===
==== League table ====
| Pos | Team | Pld | W | D | L | GF | GA | GD | Pts | Qualification or relegation |
|---|---|---|---|---|---|---|---|---|---|---|
| 12 | Khimki (D, R) | 30 | 6 | 11 | 13 | 35 | 56 | −21 | 29 (Note: Dynamo Makhachkala 4–1 Khimki, Khimki 1–1 Dynamo Makhachkala) | Administratively relegated, then dissolved. (Note: Khimki were not issued the 2025–26 RPL license and were administratively relegated. They were replaced by Pari Nizhny Novgorod. Khimki were then dissolved.) |
| 13 | Pari Nizhny Novgorod (X) | 30 | 7 | 6 | 17 | 27 | 54 | −27 | 27 | Qualification to relegation play-offs |
| 14 | Akhmat Grozny (O) | 30 | 4 | 13 | 13 | 27 | 48 | −21 | 25 | Qualification to relegation play-offs |
| 15 | Orenburg (Note: Orenburg was originally relegated, then returned to Russian Premier League on 11 July 2025 to replace Torpedo Moscow which was originally promoted and then removed from the league for attempted match-fixing in the previous season.) | 30 | 4 | 7 | 19 | 28 | 56 | −28 | 19 | |
| 16 | Fakel Voronezh (R) | 30 | 2 | 12 | 16 | 14 | 42 | −28 | 18 | Relegation to First League |

Source: Premier Liga
Rules for classification: 1) Points; 2) Head-to-head points; 3) Head-to-head matches won; 4) Head-to-head goal difference; 5) Head-to-head goals scored; 6) Matches won; 7) Goal difference; 8) Goals scored; 9) 2023–24 position (not applicable to final standings); 10) Play-off. Note: if teams tied on points did not play an equal number of head-to-head games, head-to-head results are not considered for the standings.
(D) Disqualified; (O) Play-off winners; (R) Relegated; (X) Lost in the play-offs, reprieved from relegation after Khimki was administratively relegated.

==== Results summary ====
| Overall | | | | | | | | Home | | | | | | Away | | | | | |
| Pld | W | D | L | GF | GA | GD | Pts | W | D | L | GF | GA | GD | W | D | L | GF | GA | GD |
|---|---|---|---|---|---|---|---|---|---|---|---|---|---|---|---|---|---|---|---|
| 30 | 4 | 13 | 13 | 27 | 48 | −21 | 25 | 3 | 8 | 4 | 16 | 22 | −6 | 1 | 5 | 9 | 11 | 26 | −15 |

Last updated: 24 May 2025.

==== Results by round ====
| Round | 1 | 2 | 3 | 4 | 5 | 6 | 7 | 8 | 9 | 10 | 11 | 12 | 13 | 14 | 15 | 16 | 17 | 18 | 19 | 20 | 21 | 22 | 23 | 24 | 25 | 26 | 27 | 28 | 29 | 30 |
|---|---|---|---|---|---|---|---|---|---|---|---|---|---|---|---|---|---|---|---|---|---|---|---|---|---|---|---|---|---|---|
| Ground | H | A | H | A | A | H | H | A | H | A | A | H | A | H | H | A | H | H | H | A | A | H | A | H | A | A | H | A | H | A |
| Result | D | D | L | D | L | D | D | L | D | L | L | L | W | L | L | L | D | W | W | D | D | D | D | W | L | L | D | L | D | L |
| Position | 7 | 11 | 14 | 13 | 15 | 16 | 15 | 16 | 15 | 16 | 16 | 16 | 15 | 15 | 15 | 15 | 15 | 15 | 14 | 14 | 14 | 14 | 13 | 13 | 13 | 14 | 13 | 14 | 14 | 14 |

Updated to match(es) played on 24 May 2025. Source:
A = Away; H = Home; W = Win; D = Draw; L = Loss
Notes:
- ^{1}

==== Matches ====
The match schedule was released on 20 June 2024.

| 21 July 2024 1 | Akhmat Grozny | 1–1 | Krasnodar | Grozny |
| 20:00 MSK (UTC+3) | Kamilov 43'; Ghandri (yellow card) 84' | Report | Sá (yellow card) 8'; Kozlov (yellow card) 13'; Krivtsov 30'; Kaio (yellow card) 49' | Stadium: Akhmat-Arena; Attendance: 5,397; Referee: Vitali Meshkov |

| 28 July 2024 2 | Orenburg | 0–0 | Akhmat Grozny | Orenburg |
| 17:30 MSK (UTC+3) | Pérez (yellow card) 38'; Ghorbani (yellow card) 60' | Report | Kovachev (yellow card) 19'; Ghandri (yellow card) 40'; Berisha 71' | Stadium: Gazovik Stadium; Attendance: 5,673; Referee: Yan Bobrovsky |

| 4 August 2024 3 | Akhmat Grozny | 0–5 | Lokomotiv Moscow | Grozny |
| 20:30 MSK (UTC+3) | Šatara (yellow card) 39'; Ghandri (yellow card) 51' | Report | Vorobyov 8' (pen.) (yellow card) 51'; Nyamsi 17', 36'; Nenakhov (yellow card) 28'; Silyanov (yellow card) 52'; Tiknizyan (yellow card) 56'; Suleymanov (yellow card) 76'; Rakov 79'; Batrakov 90+1' | Stadium: Akhmat-Arena; Attendance: 5,539; Referee: Artem Chistyakov |

| 11 August 2024 4 | Spartak Moscow | 0–0 | Akhmat Grozny | Moscow |
| 20:00 MSK (UTC+3) | Litvinov (yellow card) 45+'; Umyarov (yellow card) 54'; Denisov (yellow card) 59'; Babić (yellow card) 63' | Report | Sadulayev (yellow card) 47'; Shvets (yellow card) 63'; Agalarov (yellow card) 68'; Sheliya (yellow card) 90+' | Stadium: Lukoil Arena; Attendance: 14,257; Referee: Vladislav Bezborodov |

| 19 August 2024 5 | Dynamo Makhachkala | 1–0 | Akhmat Grozny | Kaspiysk |
| 20:00 MSK (UTC+3) | Hosseinnejad (yellow card) 75' (goal) 87'; Zinovich (yellow card) 90+' | Report | Felippe (yellow card) 38'; Shvets (yellow card) 85' | Stadium: Anzhi Arena; Attendance: 8,967; Referee: Pavel Shadykhanov |

| 24 August 2024 6 | Akhmat Grozny | 3–3 | Khimki | Grozny |
| 20:00 MSK (UTC+3) | Zhirov (yellow card) 31' (goal) 73'; Cardoso 75'; Ghandri (yellow card) 82'; Lovat 90+3' (yellow card) 90+4' | Report | Fariña (yellow card) 26'; Mirzov 31'; Rudenko 67'; Magomedov (red card) 90+2'; Zabolotny 90+8' | Stadium: Akhmat-Arena; Attendance: 4,489; Referee: Yan Bobrovsky |

| 31 August 2024 7 | Akhmat Grozny | 0–0 | Akron Tolyatti | Grozny |
| 20:00 MSK (UTC+3) | Camilo (yellow card) 88' | Report | Bakayev (yellow card) 67'; Escoval (yellow card) 87' | Stadium: Akhmat-Arena; Attendance: 3,863; Referee: Roman Safyan |

| 15 September 2024 8 | Dynamo Moscow | 4–2 | Akhmat Grozny | Moscow |
| 14:15 MSK (UTC+3) | Carrascal 43' (pen.); Tyukavin 48'; Makarov 90+'; Gagnidze 90+' | Report | Diale 54'; Sadulayev 64' (yellow card) 73'; Todorović (yellow card) 78'; Ghandri (yellow card) 90+' | Stadium: VTB Arena; Attendance: 10,582; Referee: Artem Chistyakov |

| 23 September 2024 9 | Akhmat Grozny | 1–1 | Krylia Sovetov | Grozny |
| 18:00 MSK (UTC+3) | Felippe (yellow card) 27' (goal) 68'; Camilo (yellow card) 29'; Todorović (yellow card) 90+6' | Report | Yezhov (yellow card) 49'; Oleynikov (yellow card) 60'; Oroz (yellow card) 87' (goal) 90+6'; Galdames (yellow card) 90+9' | Stadium: Akhmat-Arena; Attendance: 4,907; Referee: Evgeny Kukulyak |

| 28 September 2024 10 | CSKA Moscow | 3–0 | Akhmat Grozny | Moscow |
| 14:00 MSK (UTC+3) | Fayzullaev 19'; Khellven 42'; Todorović 50' (o.g.); Kislyak (yellow card) 83' | Report | Camilo (yellow card) 11' | Stadium: VEB Arena; Attendance: 7,416; Referee: Pavel Kukuyan |

| 5 October 2024 11 | Rubin Kazan | 2–0 | Akhmat Grozny | Kazan |
| 19:00 MSK (UTC+3) | Rozhkov 45'; Daku (yellow card) 79' (goal) 90+'; Teslenko (yellow card) 90+'; Zotov (yellow card) 90+' | Report | Kovachev (yellow card) 22'; Ismael (yellow card) 51'; Diale (yellow card) 90+'; Todorović (penalty missed) 90+' | Stadium: Ak Bars Arena; Attendance: 5,871; Referee: Ivan Abrosimov |

| 18 October 2024 12 | Akhmat Grozny | 2–3 | Fakel Voronezh | Grozny |
| 20:15 MSK (UTC+3) | Talal 13'; Kamilov 33'; Ghandri (yellow card) 43'; Kovachev (yellow card) 49' | Report | Kashtanov 16', 90+4'; Kvekveskiri (yellow card) 18'; Dziov (yellow card) 45+2' (yellow-red card) 84'; Senhadji (yellow card) 48'; Markov 77' (pen.); Belenov (yellow card) 90+7' | Stadium: Akhmat-Arena; Attendance: 4,709; Referee: Vladislav Bezborodov |

| 26 October 2024 13 | Rostov | 2–3 | Akhmat Grozny | Rostov-on-Don |
| 19:00 MSK (UTC+3) | Komlichenko 24'; Glebov (yellow card) 60'; Mohebi 69'; Vakhaniya (yellow card) 70'; Sako (yellow card) 82' | Report | Utkin 33'; Sadulayev 36', 51'; Kamilov (yellow card) 82' | Stadium: Rostov Arena; Attendance: 8,356; Referee: Aleksey Sukhoi |

| 3 November 2024 14 | Akhmat Grozny | 0–2 | Pari Nizhny Novgorod | Grozny |
| 15:15 MSK (UTC+3) | Sadulayev (penalty missed) 54'; Camilo (yellow card) 61'; Kamilov (yellow card) 73'; Shvets (yellow card) 87'; Lovat (yellow card) 90+' | Report | Kakkoyev (yellow card) 32'; Ožegović (yellow card) 53'; Boselli 55'; Karič (yellow card) 59'; Ektov 90+' | Stadium: Akhmat-Arena; Attendance: 4,303; Referee: Pavel Kukuyan |

| 10 November 2024 15 | Akhmat Grozny | 1–2 | Zenit St.Petersburg | Grozny |
| 17:30 MSK (UTC+3) | Adamov 2'; Sadulayev (yellow card) 51'; Kamilov (red card) 90+' | Report | Mantuan 9'; Cassierra 21'; Barrios (yellow card) 82' | Stadium: Akhmat-Arena; Attendance: 4,883; Referee: Artem Chistyakov |

| 24 November 2024 16 | Krylia Sovetov | 2–1 | Akhmat Grozny | Samara |
| 14:00 MSK (UTC+3) | Fernando (yellow card) HT; Oroz 49'; Rasskazov (yellow card) 57'; Dmitriyev (yellow card) 75' (goal) 88' | Report | Ghandri (yellow card) 39'; Samorodov 43'; Utkin (penalty missed) 68'; Todorović (yellow card) 85' | Stadium: Solidarnost Samara Arena; Attendance: 4,597; Referee: Pavel Shadykhanov |

| 2 December 2024 17 | Akhmat Grozny | 1–1 | Dynamo Moscow | Grozny |
| 19:00 MSK (UTC+3) | Samorodov 22'; Ghandri (yellow card) 25'; Cardoso (yellow card) 45+'; Camilo (yellow card) 63'; Todorović (yellow card) 90+' | Report | Leshchuk 90+' | Stadium: Akhmat-Arena; Attendance: 4,353; Referee: Vladimir Moskalov |

| 8 December 2024 18 | Akhmat Grozny | 1–0 | Orenburg | Grozny |
| 19:00 MSK (UTC+3) | Zhirov 50'; Camilo (yellow card) 57'; Ismael (yellow card) 78'; Talal (yellow card) 90+' | Report | Bašić (yellow card) 38'; Karataş (yellow card) 49'; Stolbov (yellow card) 85' | Stadium: Akhmat-Arena; Attendance: 3,796; Referee: Sergey Ivanov |

| 1 March 2025 19 | Akhmat Grozny | 2–1 | Rubin Kazan | Grozny |
| 19:00 MSK (UTC+3) | Ghandri 41' (pen.), 63'; Sadulayev (yellow card) 74'; Utkin (yellow card) 90+' | Report | Shabanhaxhaj 10'; Čumić (yellow card) 23'; Vujačić (yellow card) 33'; Teslenko (yellow card) 38'; Ashurmatov (yellow card) 49'; Hodža (yellow card) 90+' | Stadium: Akhmat-Arena; Attendance: 3,537; Referee: Artem Chistyakov |

| 7 March 2025 20 | Lokomotiv Moscow | 1–1 | Akhmat Grozny | Moscow |
| 20:15 MSK (UTC+3) | Fasson (yellow card) 12'; Batrakov 16'; Timofeyev (yellow card) 43' | Report | Ismael (yellow card) 3'; Samorodov 40'; Melkadze (yellow card) 57'; Utkin (yellow card) FT | Stadium: RZD Arena; Attendance: 6,817; Referee: Ivan Abrosimov |

| 15 March 2025 21 | Khimki | 1–1 | Akhmat Grozny | Khimki |
| 14:30 MSK (UTC+3) | Bakayev (yellow card) 42'; Stepanov (yellow card) 44'; Zorin 76' (o.g.); Fernández (yellow card) 82'; Mejía (yellow card) 90+' | Report | Talal (yellow card) 31'; Todorović (yellow card) 42'; Ghandri (penalty missed) 69'; Zorin 72' (yellow card) 78' | Stadium: Arena Khimki; Attendance: 1,206; Referee: Kirill Levnikov |

| 30 March 2025 22 | Akhmat Grozny | 0–0 | Spartak Moscow | Grozny |
| 16:30 MSK (UTC+3) | Ghandri (yellow card) 15'; Ibishev (yellow card) 36' | Report | Babić (yellow card) 83' | Stadium: Akhmat-Arena; Attendance: 1,706; Referee: Vasily Kazartsev |

| 5 April 2025 23 | Fakel Voronezh | 0–0 | Akhmat Grozny | Voronezh |
| 15:15 MSK (UTC+3) | | Report | Melkadze (yellow card) 30'; Kamilov (yellow card) 32'; Ismael (yellow card) 87' | Stadium: Fakel Stadium; Attendance: 0 Referee: Ivan Abrosimov |

| 12 April 2025 24 | Akhmat Grozny | 2–1 | Rostov | Grozny |
| 19:30 MSK (UTC+3) | Kamilov (yellow card) 23'; Ghandri 51'; Samorodov 67' | Report | Vakhaniya (yellow card) 41'; Sako (yellow card) 43'; Komlichenko 75'; Komarov (yellow card) 90+' | Stadium: Akhmat-Arena; Attendance: 4,628; Referee: Yan Bobrovsky |

| 19 April 2025 25 | Krasnodar | 3–1 | Akhmat Grozny | Krasnodar |
| 19:30 MSK (UTC+3) | Batxi (yellow card) 36'; Córdoba 40'; Krivtsov (yellow card) 63'; Spertsyan 78' (pen.); Pina 80' González (yellow card) 84' | Report | Melkadze 52'; Todorović (yellow card) 64' | Stadium: Krasnodar Stadium; Attendance: 26,999; Referee: Vladimir Moskalyov |

| 26 April 2025 26 | Pari Nizhny Novgorod | 1–0 | Akhmat Grozny | Nizhny Novgorod |
| 14:00 MSK (UTC+3) | Troshechkin (yellow card) 31'; Maiga (yellow card) 42'; Boselli 45+' (yellow card) 90+'; Agapov (yellow card) 60'; Vecino (yellow card) 65'; Karapuzov (yellow card) 90+' | Report | Ghandri (yellow card) 12'; Ismael (yellow card) 17'; Melkadze (yellow card) 84'; Samorodov (penalty missed) 90+' | Stadium: Nizhny Novgorod Stadium; Attendance: 7,281; Referee: Pavel Shadykhanov |

| 4 May 2025 27 | Akhmat Grozny | 1–1 | CSKA Moscow | Grozny |
| 16:30 MSK (UTC+3) | Ibishev (yellow card) 27'; Samorodov 33' | Report | Koïta 9'; Oblyakov (yellow card) 16'; Fayzullaev (yellow card) 57'; Guarirapa (yellow card) 81'; Khellven (yellow card) 90+' | Stadium: Akhmat-Arena; Attendance: 5,368; Referee: Artem Chistyakov |

| 11 May 2025 28 | Akron Tolyatti | 3–2 | Akhmat Grozny | Samara |
| 14:00 MSK (UTC+3) | Pestryakov 17'; Bakayev (yellow card) 21'; Đakovac 45+'; Benchimol (yellow card) 61' (yellow-red card) 90+'; Savichev (yellow card) 79'; Khubulov 85' | Report | Talal 8'; Melkadze 72'; Ismael (yellow card) 75'; Kharin (yellow card) 84' | Stadium: Solidarnost Samara Arena; Attendance: 2,967; Referee: Ivan Abrosimov |

| 18 May 2025 29 | Akhmat Grozny | 1–1 | Dynamo Makhachkala | Grozny |
| 14:00 MSK (UTC+3) | Ismael (yellow card) 14'; Samorodov 48' | Report | Mrezigue (yellow card) 30'; Serderov 36' (pen.); Tabidze (yellow card) 45+'; Shumakhov (yellow card) 55'; Hosseinnejad (yellow card) 72' | Stadium: Akhmat-Arena; Attendance: 5,276; Referee: Yan Bobrovsky |

| 24 May 2025 30 | Zenit St.Petersburg | 3–0 | Akhmat Grozny | Saint Petersburg |
| 16:30 MSK (UTC+3) | Mostovoy 25' (pen.), 45+' (pen.); Pedro 59' | Report | Zhirov (yellow card) 12'; Kamilov (yellow card) 23'; Samorodov (yellow card) 32' | Stadium: Krestovsky Stadium; Attendance: 52,799; Referee: Sergey Ivanov |

==== Relegation play-offs ====
| 28 May 2025 1st leg | Ural Yekaterinburg | 1–2 | Akhmat Grozny | Yekaterinburg |
| 17:00 MSK (UTC+3) | Yegorychev (yellow card) 15'; Sungatulin (yellow card) 25'; Sekulić 50' (pen.), 59'; Begić (yellow card) 65' | Report | Todorović (yellow card) 16'; Melkadze 21' | Stadium: Central Stadium; Attendance: 19,679; Referee: Kirill Levnikov |

| 31 May 2025 2nd leg | Akhmat Grozny | 2–0 (3–2 agg.) | Ural Yekaterinburg | Grozny |
| 19:30 MSK (UTC+3) | Adamov (yellow card) 38'; Sadulayev (yellow card) 41'; Melkadze 51' (pen.) (yellow card) 56'; Zorin 90+2' | Report | Begić (yellow card) 49'; Ayupov (yellow card) 56'; Malkevich (yellow card) 73'; Zheleznov (yellow card) 83' | Stadium: Akhmat-Arena; Referee: Sergey Ivanov |

=== Russian Cup ===
==== Group stage ====
| Pos | Team | Pld | W | PW | PL | L | GF | GA | GD | Pts | Qualification |
|---|---|---|---|---|---|---|---|---|---|---|---|
| 1 | CSKA Moscow | 6 | 4 | 1 | 0 | 1 | 8 | 2 | +6 | 14 | Qualification to the Knockout phase (RPL path) |
| 2 | Akhmat Grozny | 6 | 3 | 0 | 0 | 3 | 9 | 6 | +3 | 9 (Note: Goal difference in head-to-head games: Akhmat +2, Krasnodar -2 (3-0, 0-1)) | Qualification to the Knockout phase (RPL path) |
| 3 | Krasnodar | 6 | 3 | 0 | 0 | 3 | 4 | 7 | −3 | 9 | Qualification to the Knockout phase (regions path) |
| 4 | Pari Nizhny Novgorod | 6 | 1 | 0 | 1 | 4 | 5 | 11 | −6 | 4 | |

Source: Russian Football Union (in Russian), Soccerway
Rules for classification: 1) Points; 2) Head-to-head points; 3) Head-to-head matches won; 4) Head-to-head goal difference; 5) Head-to-head goals scored; 6) Matches won; 7) Goal difference; 8) Goals scored; 9) Penalty shoot-out goal difference; 10) Draw.
Notes:

| 31 July 2024 1 | Akhmat Grozny | 4–1 | Pari Nizhny Novgorod | Grozny |
| 21:00 MSK (UTC+3) | Agalarov 26' (pen.); Shvets 42'; Berisha 54', 60' (yellow card) 87' | Report | Aleksandrov (yellow card) 25'; Gotsuk 40'; Shnaptsev (yellow card) 74'; Tičić (yellow card) 77' | Stadium: Akhmat-Arena; Attendance: 4,635; Referee: Ivan Abrosimov |

| 15 August 2024 2 | Krasnodar | 1–0 | Akhmat Grozny | Krasnodar |
| 20:30 MSK (UTC+3) | Olusegun (yellow card) 11'; Castaño (yellow card) 72'; Chernikov (yellow card) 78'; Zhirov 87' (o.g.); Batxi (yellow card) 90+6' | Report | Felippe (yellow card) 52'; Šatara (yellow card) 90+5' | Stadium: Krasnodar Stadium; Attendance: 17,377; Referee: Vasily Kazartsev |

| 27 August 2024 3 | Akhmat Grozny | 0–2 | CSKA Moscow | Grozny |
| 17:15 MSK (UTC+3) | Shvets (yellow card) 15'; Šatara (yellow card) 53'; Camilo (yellow card) 90+6' | Report | Bistrović (yellow card) 35'; Willyan (yellow card) 72'; Musayev 87'; Krugovoy 90+7' | Stadium: Akhmat-Arena; Attendance: 6,517; Referee: Egor Egorov |

| 19 September 2024 4 | Pari Nizhny Novgorod | 1–2 | Akhmat Grozny | Nizhny Novgorod |
| 18:30 MSK (UTC+3) | Gotsuk 28' (red card) 58'; Aleksandrov (yellow card) 45+1'; Kakkoyev (yellow card) 49'; Tsarukyan (yellow card) 90+1' | Report | Samorodov 10'; Lovat 59' (pen.); Talal (yellow card) 76'; Oparin (yellow card) 90'; Utsiyev (yellow card) 90+4' | Stadium: Nizhny Novgorod Stadium; Attendance: 7,821; Referee: Evgeniy Bulanov |

| 2 October 2024 5 | Akhmat Grozny | 3–0 | Krasnodar | Grozny |
| 21:15 MSK (UTC+3) | Ghandri 19'; Ismael (yellow card) 30'; Kovachev 45+4'; Kamilov (yellow card) 49'; Talal 82' | Report | González (yellow card) 43'; Krivtsov (yellow card) 45+2'; Córdoba (red card) 77' | Stadium: Akhmat-Arena; Attendance: 6,723; Referee: Pavel Shadykhanov |

| 22 October 2024 6 | CSKA Moscow | 1–0 | Akhmat Grozny | Moscow |
| 20:45 MSK (UTC+3) | Koïta 34' (yellow card) 49'; Bistrović (yellow card) 49'; Zdjelar (yellow card) 88' | Report | Shvets (yellow card) 24' | Stadium: VEB Arena; Attendance: 11,128; Referee: Vladimir Moskalyov |

==== Knockout phase ====
| 6 November 2024 RPL path Quarterfinals 1st leg | Zenit St.Petersburg | 3–0 | Akhmat Grozny | Saint Petersburg |
| 20:45 MSK (UTC+3) | Claudinho 20'; Chistyakov (yellow card) 41'; Cassierra 53'; Sobolev 88' | Report | Silva (yellow card) 5'; Samorodov (yellow card) 84' | Stadium: Krestovsky Stadium; Attendance: 20,570; Referee: Evgeniy Kukulyak |

| 27 November 2024 RPL path Quarterfinals 2nd leg | Akhmat Grozny | 1–2 (1–5 agg.) | Zenit St.Petersburg | Grozny |
| 18:15 MSK (UTC+3) | Kamilov (yellow card) 31'; Felippe (yellow card) 49'; Samorodov 90+1' | Report | Gondou 14'; Artur 72' | Stadium: Akhmat-Arena; Attendance: 5,648; Referee: Egor Egorov |

| 11 March 2025 Regions path Quarter-finals Stage 2 | Krasnodar | 1–2 | Akhmat Grozny | Krasnodar |
| 20:30 MSK (UTC+3) | Córdoba 56' (yellow card) 86'; Cobnan (yellow card) 76' | Report | Luna Diale (yellow card) 20'; Kamilov (yellow card) 36'; Berisha 66', 72' (pen.) (yellow card) 83' | Stadium: Krasnodar Stadium; Attendance: 24,177; Referee: Sergey Cheban |

| 15 April 2025 Regions path Semi-finals Stage 1 | Spartak Moscow | 2–1 | Akhmat Grozny | Moscow |
| 18:00 MSK (UTC+3) | Vorobyov 44'; Pogostnov 45'; Batrakov (yellow card) 52'; Rakov (yellow card) 88' | Report | Díaz 8'; Ismael (yellow card) 39'; Berisha (yellow card) 65' | Stadium: RZD Arena; Attendance: 9,456; Referee: Sergey Ivanov |

== Squad statistics ==
As of match played 31 May 2025

=== Appearances and goals ===
| No. | Pos | Nat | Player | Total | | Premier League | | Relegation play-offs | | Russian Cup | |
| No. | Pos | Nat | Player | Apps | Goals | Apps | Goals | Apps | Goals | Apps | Goals |
|---|---|---|---|---|---|---|---|---|---|---|---|
| 1 | GK | (Russia) RUS | Vadim Ulyanov | 5 | 0 | 2 | 0 | 1 | 0 | 2 | 0 |
| 2 | DF | (Russia) RUS | Aleksandr Zhirov | 28 | 2 | 18+3 | 2 | 0 | 0 | 4+3 | 0 |
| 3 | DF | (Russia) RUS | Leo Goglichidze | 7 | 0 | 2+2 | 0 | 1 | 0 | 2 | 0 |
| 4 | DF | (Russia) RUS | Turpal-Ali Ibishev | 25 | 0 | 17 | 0 | 2 | 0 | 6 | 0 |
| 5 | DF | (Bosnia and Herzegovina) BIH | Miloš Šatara | 23 | 0 | 9+5 | 0 | 2 | 0 | 6+1 | 0 |
| 7 | MF | (Kosovo) KOS | Bernard Berisha | 17 | 4 | 3+10 | 0 | 0 | 0 | 3+1 | 4 |
| 8 | DF | (Serbia) SRB | Miroslav Bogosavac | 14 | 0 | 9+1 | 0 | 0 | 0 | 3+1 | 0 |
| 9 | FW | (Paraguay) PAR | Rodrigo Ruiz Díaz | 14 | 1 | 0+11 | 0 | 0+1 | 0 | 2 | 1 |
| 10 | MF | (Russia) RUS | Lechi Sadulayev | 35 | 3 | 27+1 | 3 | 2 | 0 | 2+3 | 0 |
| 11 | MF | (Brazil) BRA | Ismael Silva | 33 | 0 | 20+5 | 0 | 2 | 0 | 5+1 | 0 |
| 13 | DF | (Russia) RUS | Minkail Matsuyev | 2 | 0 | 0 | 0 | 0 | 0 | 0+2 | 0 |
| 14 | MF | (Morocco) MAR | Amine Talal | 26 | 3 | 11+7 | 2 | 1+1 | 0 | 5+1 | 1 |
| 18 | MF | (Russia) RUS | Vladislav Kamilov | 35 | 2 | 13+12 | 2 | 2 | 0 | 7+1 | 0 |
| 19 | MF | (Argentina) ARG | Mauro Luna Diale | 23 | 1 | 5+10 | 1 | 0 | 0 | 5+3 | 0 |
| 20 | FW | (Kazakhstan) KAZ | Maksim Samorodov | 32 | 8 | 21+3 | 6 | 1+1 | 0 | 2+4 | 2 |
| 23 | MF | (Russia) RUS | Anton Shvets | 22 | 1 | 9+6 | 0 | 0 | 0 | 6+1 | 1 |
| 24 | MF | (Montenegro) MNE | Zaim Divanović | 14 | 0 | 1+6 | 0 | 0+1 | 0 | 6 | 0 |
| 28 | MF | (Russia) RUS | Daniil Zorin | 14 | 2 | 4+6 | 1 | 1+1 | 1 | 0+2 | 0 |
| 32 | DF | (Russia) RUS | Ilias Gaibov | 1 | 0 | 0 | 0 | 0 | 0 | 0+1 | 0 |
| 40 | DF | (Russia) RUS | Rizvan Utsiyev | 9 | 0 | 1 | 0 | 0 | 0 | 7+1 | 0 |
| 47 | MF | (Russia) RUS | Daniil Utkin | 21 | 1 | 15+1 | 1 | 0 | 0 | 1+4 | 0 |
| 55 | DF | (Bosnia and Herzegovina) BIH | Darko Todorović | 34 | 0 | 24+3 | 0 | 2 | 0 | 2+3 | 0 |
| 59 | DF | (Russia) RUS | Yevgeni Kharin | 3 | 0 | 0+2 | 0 | 0 | 0 | 1 | 0 |
| 71 | MF | (Russia) RUS | Magomed Yakuyev | 5 | 0 | 0+2 | 0 | 0 | 0 | 2+1 | 0 |
| 72 | GK | (Russia) RUS | Yakhya Magomedov | 1 | 0 | 0 | 0 | 0 | 0 | 0+1 | 0 |
| 75 | DF | (Tunisia) TUN | Nader Ghandri | 28 | 4 | 19+3 | 3 | 0 | 0 | 4+2 | 1 |
| 77 | FW | (Russia) RUS | Georgi Melkadze | 15 | 4 | 12 | 2 | 2 | 2 | 0+1 | 0 |
| 88 | GK | (Russia) RUS | Giorgi Sheliya | 30 | 0 | 27 | 0 | 1 | 0 | 2 | 0 |
| 95 | DF | (Russia) RUS | Arsen Adamov | 36 | 1 | 29+1 | 1 | 2 | 0 | 2+2 | 0 |
Players away from the club on loan:
| 30 | FW | (Brazil) BRA | Felippe Cardoso | 17 | 2 | 8+4 | 2 | 0 | 0 | 3+2 | 0 |
| 36 | DF | (Brazil) BRA | Lucas Lovat | 13 | 2 | 0+7 | 1 | 0 | 0 | 5+1 | 1 |
| 98 | MF | (Bulgaria) BUL | Svetoslav Kovachev | 16 | 1 | 5+5 | 0 | 0 | 0 | 6 | 1 |
Players who appeared for Akhmat Grozny but left during the season:
| 1 | GK | (Russia) RUS | Mikhail Oparin | 7 | 0 | 1 | 0 | 0 | 0 | 6 | 0 |
| 9 | FW | (Russia) RUS | Gamid Agalarov | 4 | 1 | 3 | 0 | 0 | 0 | 1 | 1 |
| 15 | MF | (Brazil) BRA | Camilo | 21 | 0 | 15+1 | 0 | 0 | 0 | 2+3 | 0 |
| 21 | MF | (Russia) RUS | Ivan Oleynikov | 1 | 0 | 0+1 | 0 | 0 | 0 | 0 | 0 |

=== Goal scorers ===
| Place | Position | Nation | Number | Name | Premier League | Relegation play-offs | Russian Cup | Total |
|---|---|---|---|---|---|---|---|---|
| 1 | FW | (Kazakhstan) | 20 | Maksim Samorodov | 6 | 0 | 2 | 8 |
| 2 | DF | (Tunisia) | 75 | Nader Ghandri | 3 | 0 | 1 | 4 |
| 2 | FW | (Russia) | 77 | Georgi Melkadze | 2 | 2 | 0 | 4 |
| 2 | MF | (Kosovo) | 7 | Bernard Berisha | 0 | 0 | 4 | 4 |
| 5 | MF | (Russia) | 10 | Lechi Sadulayev | 3 | 0 | 0 | 3 |
| 5 | MF | (Morocco) | 14 | Amine Talal | 2 | 0 | 1 | 3 |
| 7 | FW | (Brazil) | 30 | Felippe Cardoso | 2 | 0 | 0 | 2 |
| 7 | MF | (Russia) | 18 | Vladislav Kamilov | 2 | 0 | 0 | 2 |
| 7 | DF | (Russia) | 2 | Aleksandr Zhirov | 2 | 0 | 0 | 2 |
| 7 | MF | (Russia) | 28 | Daniil Zorin | 1 | 1 | 0 | 2 |
| 7 | DF | (Brazil) | 36 | Lucas Lovat | 1 | 0 | 1 | 2 |
| 12 | MF | (Argentina) | 19 | Mauro Luna Diale | 1 | 0 | 0 | 1 |
| 12 | MF | (Russia) | 47 | Daniil Utkin | 1 | 0 | 0 | 1 |
| 12 | DF | (Russia) | 95 | Arsen Adamov | 1 | 0 | 0 | 1 |
| 12 | FW | (Russia) | 9 | Gamid Agalarov | 0 | 0 | 1 | 1 |
| 12 | MF | (Russia) | 23 | Anton Shvets | 0 | 0 | 1 | 1 |
| 12 | MF | (Bulgaria) | 98 | Svetoslav Kovachev | 0 | 0 | 1 | 1 |
| 12 | FW | (Paraguay) | 9 | Rodrigo Ruiz Díaz | 0 | 0 | 1 | 1 |
| Total | | | | | 27 | 3 | 13 | 42 |

=== Clean sheets ===
| Place | Position | Nation | Number | Name | Premier League | Relegation play-offs | Russian Cup | Total |
|---|---|---|---|---|---|---|---|---|
| 1 | GK | (Russia) | 88 | Giorgi Sheliya | 5 | 1 | 0 | 6 |
| 2 | GK | (Russia) | 1 | Mikhail Oparin | 1 | 0 | 1 | 2 |
| Total | | | | | 6 | 1 | 1 | 8 |

=== Disciplinary record ===
| Number | Nation | Position | Name | Premier League | | Relegation play-offs | | Russian Cup | | Total | |
| Number | Nation | Position | Name | Yellow card | Red card | Yellow card | Red card | Yellow card | Red card | Yellow card | Red card |
|---|---|---|---|---|---|---|---|---|---|---|---|
| 2 | (Russia) | DF | Aleksandr Zhirov | 2 | 0 | 0 | 0 | 0 | 0 | 2 | 0 |
| 4 | (Russia) | DF | Turpal-Ali Ibishev | 2 | 0 | 0 | 0 | 0 | 0 | 2 | 0 |
| 5 | (Bosnia and Herzegovina) | DF | Miloš Šatara | 1 | 0 | 0 | 0 | 2 | 0 | 3 | 0 |
| 7 | (Kosovo) | MF | Bernard Berisha | 1 | 0 | 0 | 0 | 3 | 0 | 4 | 0 |
| 10 | (Russia) | MF | Lechi Sadulayev | 4 | 0 | 1 | 0 | 0 | 0 | 5 | 0 |
| 11 | (Brazil) | MF | Ismael Silva | 6 | 0 | 0 | 0 | 3 | 0 | 9 | 0 |
| 14 | (Morocco) | MF | Amine Talal | 2 | 0 | 0 | 0 | 1 | 0 | 3 | 0 |
| 18 | (Russia) | MF | Vladislav Kamilov | 5 | 1 | 0 | 0 | 3 | 0 | 8 | 1 |
| 19 | (Argentina) | MF | Mauro Luna Diale | 1 | 0 | 0 | 0 | 1 | 0 | 2 | 0 |
| 20 | (Kazakhstan) | FW | Maksim Samorodov | 1 | 0 | 0 | 0 | 1 | 0 | 2 | 0 |
| 23 | (Russia) | MF | Anton Shvets | 3 | 0 | 0 | 0 | 2 | 0 | 5 | 0 |
| 28 | (Russia) | MF | Daniil Zorin | 1 | 0 | 0 | 0 | 0 | 0 | 1 | 0 |
| 40 | (Russia) | DF | Rizvan Utsiyev | 0 | 0 | 0 | 0 | 1 | 0 | 1 | 0 |
| 47 | (Russia) | MF | Daniil Utkin | 2 | 0 | 0 | 0 | 0 | 0 | 2 | 0 |
| 55 | (Bosnia and Herzegovina) | DF | Darko Todorović | 6 | 0 | 1 | 0 | 0 | 0 | 7 | 0 |
| 59 | (Russia) | DF | Yevgeni Kharin | 1 | 0 | 0 | 0 | 0 | 0 | 1 | 0 |
| 75 | (Tunisia) | DF | Nader Ghandri | 10 | 0 | 0 | 0 | 0 | 0 | 10 | 0 |
| 77 | (Russia) | FW | Georgi Melkadze | 3 | 0 | 1 | 0 | 0 | 0 | 4 | 0 |
| 88 | (Russia) | GK | Giorgi Sheliya | 1 | 0 | 0 | 0 | 0 | 0 | 1 | 0 |
| 95 | (Russia) | DF | Arsen Adamov | 0 | 0 | 1 | 0 | 0 | 0 | 1 | 0 |
Players away on loan:
| 30 | (Brazil) | FW | Felippe Cardoso | 3 | 0 | 0 | 0 | 2 | 0 | 5 | 0 |
| 36 | (Brazil) | DF | Lucas Lovat | 2 | 0 | 0 | 0 | 0 | 0 | 2 | 0 |
| 98 | (Bulgaria) | MF | Svetoslav Kovachev | 3 | 0 | 0 | 0 | 0 | 0 | 3 | 0 |
Players who left Akhmat Grozny during the season:
| 1 | (Russia) | GK | Mikhail Oparin | 0 | 0 | 0 | 0 | 1 | 0 | 1 | 0 |
| 9 | (Russia) | FW | Gamid Agalarov | 1 | 0 | 0 | 0 | 0 | 0 | 1 | 0 |
| 15 | (Brazil) | MF | Camilo | 6 | 0 | 0 | 0 | 1 | 0 | 7 | 0 |
| Total | | | | 67 | 1 | 4 | 0 | 21 | 0 | 92 | 1 |
