= Yakhya Magomedov =

Russian footballer (born 2007)

Personal information
- Full name: Yakhya Validovich Magomedov
- Date of birth: 6 April 2007 (age 19)
- Height: 1.92 m (6 ft 4 in)
- Position: Goalkeeper

Team information
- Current team: Tyumen (on loan from Akhmat Grozny)
- Number: 72

Youth career
- Akhmat Grozny

Senior career*
Years	Team	Apps	(Gls)
2024–	Akhmat Grozny	1	(0)
2026–	→ Tyumen (loan)	0	(0)

International career^{‡}
2024–2025	Russia U18	2	(0)
2025	Russia U19	3	(0)
- * Club domestic league appearances and goals as of 17 October 2026 ‡ National team caps and goals as of 15 November 2025

Yakhya Validovich Magomedov (Russian: Яхья Валидович Магомедов; born 6 April 2007) is a Russian football player who plays as a goalkeeper for Tyumen on loan from Akhmat Grozny.

== Career ==
Magomedov made his debut for the senior squad of Akhmat Grozny on 27 November 2024 in a Russian Cup against Zenit St. Petersburg, substituting Mikhail Oparin in the 78th minute.

Magomedov made his debut in the Russian Premier League for Akhmat on 26 April 2026, also against Zenit St. Petersburg, and again as a substitute - he had to replace injured Vadim Ulyanov in the 22nd minute.

On 7 July 2026, Magomedov moved on loan to Tyumen for the 2026–27 season.

== Career statistics ==
As of 26 April 2026

Club	Season	League			Cup		Total	
Club	Season	Division	Apps	Goals	Apps	Goals	Apps	Goals
Akhmat Grozny	2023–24	Russian Premier League	0	0	0	0	0	0
Akhmat Grozny	2024–25	Russian Premier League	0	0	1	0	1	0
Akhmat Grozny	2025–26	Russian Premier League	1	0	0	0	1	0
Akhmat Grozny	Total		1	0	1	0	2	0
Career total			1	0	1	0	2	0
