= Turpal-Ali Ibishev =

Russian footballer

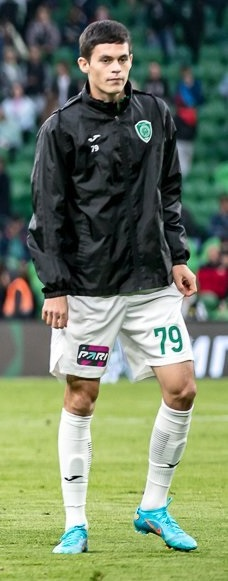
- Ibishev with Akhmat in 2022

Personal information
- Full name: Turpal-Ali Sayd-Eminovich Ibishev
- Date of birth: 18 February 2002 (age 24)
- Place of birth: Achkhoy-Martan, Russia
- Height: 1.88 m (6 ft 2 in)
- Position: Centre-back

Team information
- Current team: Akhmat Grozny
- Number: 4

Youth career
- 2020–2023: Akhmat Grozny

Senior career*
Years	Team	Apps	(Gls)
2021–	Akhmat Grozny	54	(1)
2023	→ Druzba Maykop (loan)	14	(0)

International career^{‡}
2025–	Russia	3	(0)
- * Club domestic league appearances and goals as of 21 November 2026 ‡ National team caps and goals as of 3 October 2026

Turpal-Ali Sayd-Eminovich Ibishev (Russian: Турпал-Али Сайд-Эминович Ибишев; born 18 February 2002) is a Russian professional footballer who plays as a centre-back for Akhmat Grozny and the Russia national team.

== Club career ==
He made his debut for the main team of Akhmat Grozny on 22 September 2021 in a Russian Cup game against Kairat Moscow. He made his Russian Premier League debut for Akhmat on 26 September 2021 in a game against Rostov.

On 5 July 2023, Ibishev was loaned to Druzba Maykop until 30 November 2023.

== International career ==
In March 2025, Ibishev was called up to the Russia national team for the first time for friendlies against Grenada and Zambia. He made his debut on 19 March 2025 against Grenada.

== Personal life ==
Ibishev is an ethnic Chechen.

== Career statistics ==
As of match played 21 November 2026

Club	Season	League			Cup		Other		Total	
Club	Season	Division	Apps	Goals	Apps	Goals	Apps	Goals	Apps	Goals
Akhmat Grozny	2021–22	Russian Premier League	2	0	1	0	—		3	0
Akhmat Grozny	2022–23	Russian Premier League	0	0	1	0	—		1	0
Akhmat Grozny	2023–24	Russian Premier League	3	0	0	0	—		3	0
Akhmat Grozny	2024–25	Russian Premier League	17	0	6	0	2 (Note: Appearances in the relegation play-offs)	0	25	0
Akhmat Grozny	2025–26	Russian Premier League	20	0	6	0	—		26	0
Akhmat Grozny	2026–27	Russian Premier League	12	1	5	0	—		17	1
Akhmat Grozny	Total		54	1	19	0	2	0	75	1
Druzhba Maykop (loan)	2023	Russian Second League B	14	0	2	0	—		16	0
Career total			68	1	21	0	2	0	91	1

=== International ===
As of match played 3 October 2026

Appearances and goals by national team and year
National team	Year	Apps	Goals
Russia	2025	2	0
Russia	2026	1	0
Total		3	0
