= Rodrigo Ruiz Díaz =

Paraguayan footballer (born 1999)

Personal information
- Full name: Rodrigo Ruiz Díaz Molinas
- Date of birth: 15 January 1999 (age 27)
- Place of birth: San Juan Nepomuceno, Paraguay
- Height: 1.84 m (6 ft 0 in)
- Position: Right winger

Team information
- Current team: 2 de Mayo
- Number: 11

Youth career
- Sol de América

Senior career*
Years	Team	Apps	(Gls)
2017–2021	Sol de América	70	(7)
2021–2022	Resistencia		
2022–2023	Guabirá	38	(9)
2023	Resistencia	15	(5)
2024	Técnico Universitario	15	(1)
2024–2025	2 de Mayo	22	(7)
2025	Akhmat Grozny	11	(0)
2025–	2 de Mayo	28	(8)

International career
2019	Paraguay U20	3	(0)
- * Club domestic league appearances and goals as of 11:13, 16 August 2025 (UTC)

Rodrigo Ruiz Díaz Molinas (born 15 January 1999) is a Paraguayan footballer who plays as a right winger for Club 2 de Mayo.

== Career ==
=== Club career ===
Díaz is a product of Club Sol de América. He got his officiel debut for the club on 5 February 2017 against Independiente FBC in the Paraguayan Primera División.

In the summer 2021, Ruiz Díaz moved to Resistencia. In July 2022, Ruiz Díaz joined Bolivian Primera División club Guabirá.

In the summer 2023, Ruiz Díaz returned to Resistencia. In January 2024, Ruiz Díaz signed with Ecuadorian Serie A side Técnico Universitario. In June 2024, he signed for Paraguayan Primera División club 2 de Mayo.

On 30 January 2025, Ruiz Díaz signed a contract with Russian Premier League club Akhmat Grozny until the end of the 2024–25 season, with an option to extend for three more years. The option was not exercised and Ruiz Díaz returned to 2 de Mayo in June 2025.

== Career statistics ==
As of 28 May 2025

Club	Season	League			Cup		Continental		Other		Total	
Club	Season	Division	Apps	Goals	Apps	Goals	Apps	Goals	Apps	Goals	Apps	Goals
Sol de América	2017	Paraguayan Primera División	15	2	–		1 (Note: Appearances in the Copa Sudamericana)	0	–		16	2
Sol de América	2018	Paraguayan Primera División	28	4	–		1	0	–		29	4
Sol de América	2019	Paraguayan Primera División	22	1	–		3	0	–		25	1
Sol de América	2020	Paraguayan Primera División	4	0	–		0	0	–		4	0
Sol de América	2021	Paraguayan Primera División	1	0	–		–		–		1	0
Sol de América	Total		70	7	0	0	5	0	0	0	75	7
Resistencia	2022	Paraguayan Primera División	15	2	–		–		–		15	2
Guabirá	2022	Bolivian Primera División	23	7	–		–		–		23	7
Guabirá	2023	Bolivian Primera División	15	2	–		1	0	1 (Note: Appearance in Copa de la División Profesional)	0	17	2
Guabirá	Total		38	9	0	0	1	0	1	0	40	9
Resistencia	2023	Paraguayan Primera División	15	5	–		–		–		15	5
Técnico Universitario	2024	Ecuadorian Serie A	15	1	–		1	0	–		16	1
2 de Mayo	2024	Paraguayan Primera División	22	7	–		–		–		22	7
Akhmat Grozny	2024–25	Russian Premier League	11	0	2	1	–		1 (Note: Appearance in the relegation play-offs)	0	14	1
Career total			186	31	2	1	7	0	2	0	197	32
