= Mauro Luna Diale =

Argentine footballer

Personal information
- Date of birth: 26 April 1999 (age 27)
- Place of birth: Merlo, Argentina
- Height: 1.73 m (5 ft 8 in)
- Position: Forward

Team information
- Current team: Unión Santa Fe (on loan from Akhmat Grozny)
- Number: 11

Youth career
- Boca Juniors

Senior career*
Years	Team	Apps	(Gls)
2019–2021	Boca Juniors	0	(0)
2019	→ Cerro Largo (loan)	29	(5)
2020–2021	→ Unión Santa Fe	11	(3)
2021–2024	Unión Santa Fe	106	(14)
2024–	Akhmat Grozny	15	(1)
2025–2026	→ Platense (loan)	8	(0)
2026–	→ Unión Santa Fe (loan)	13	(0)
- * Club domestic league appearances and goals as of 17:25, 22 November 2026 (UTC)

Mauro Luna Diale (born 26 April 1999) is an Argentine professional footballer who plays as a forward for Unión Santa Fe on loan from the Russian club Akhmat Grozny.

== Career ==
Luna Diale's career started out in Boca Juniors' academy, he received call-ups to first-team friendlies including in January 2017 for a Torneo de Verano exhibition with Estudiantes. On 24 January 2019, Luna Diale was loaned to Uruguayan Primera División side Cerro Largo. His professional bow came in a 2–0 victory over Danubio on 17 February.

On 18 July 2024, Luna Diale signed a four-year contract with Russian Premier League club Akhmat Grozny.

On 24 July 2025, Luna Diale returned to Argentina and signed with Platense. On 17 July 2026, Luna Diale was loaned for a year back to Unión Santa Fe.

== Career statistics ==
As of 11 March 2025.

Appearances and goals by club, season and competition
Club	Season	League			Cup		Continental		Other		Total	
Club	Season	Division	Apps	Goals	Apps	Goals	Apps	Goals	Apps	Goals	Apps	Goals
Boca Juniors	2018–19	Argentine Primera División	0	0	0	0	0	0	0	0	0	0
Cerro Largo (loan)	2019	Uruguayan Primera División	29	0	0	0	—		0	0	29	0
Unión Santa Fe	2019–20	Argentine Primera División	0	0	0	0	—		—		0	0
Unión Santa Fe	2020–21	Argentine Primera División	9	3	0	0	4 (Note: Appearances in Copa Sudamericana)	0	0	0	13	3
Unión Santa Fe	2021	Argentine Primera División	2	0	0	0	0	0	—		2	0
Unión Santa Fe	Total		11	0	0	0	4	0	0	0	15	0
Unión Santa Fe	2021	Argentine Primera División	12	4	—		—		—		12	4
Unión Santa Fe	2022	Argentine Primera Division	37	4	1	1	6	1	0	0	44	5
Unión Santa Fe	2023	Argentine Primera División	39	4	1	0	—		—		40	4
Unión Santa Fe	2024	Argentine Primera División	18	2	1	0	—		—		19	2
Unión Santa Fe	Total		106	14	3	0	6	1	0	0	115	15
Akhmat Grozny	2024–25	Russian Premier League	15	1	8	0	—		—		23	1
Career total			161	18	11	1	10	1	0	0	182	20
