= Nader Ghandri =

Footballer (born 1995)

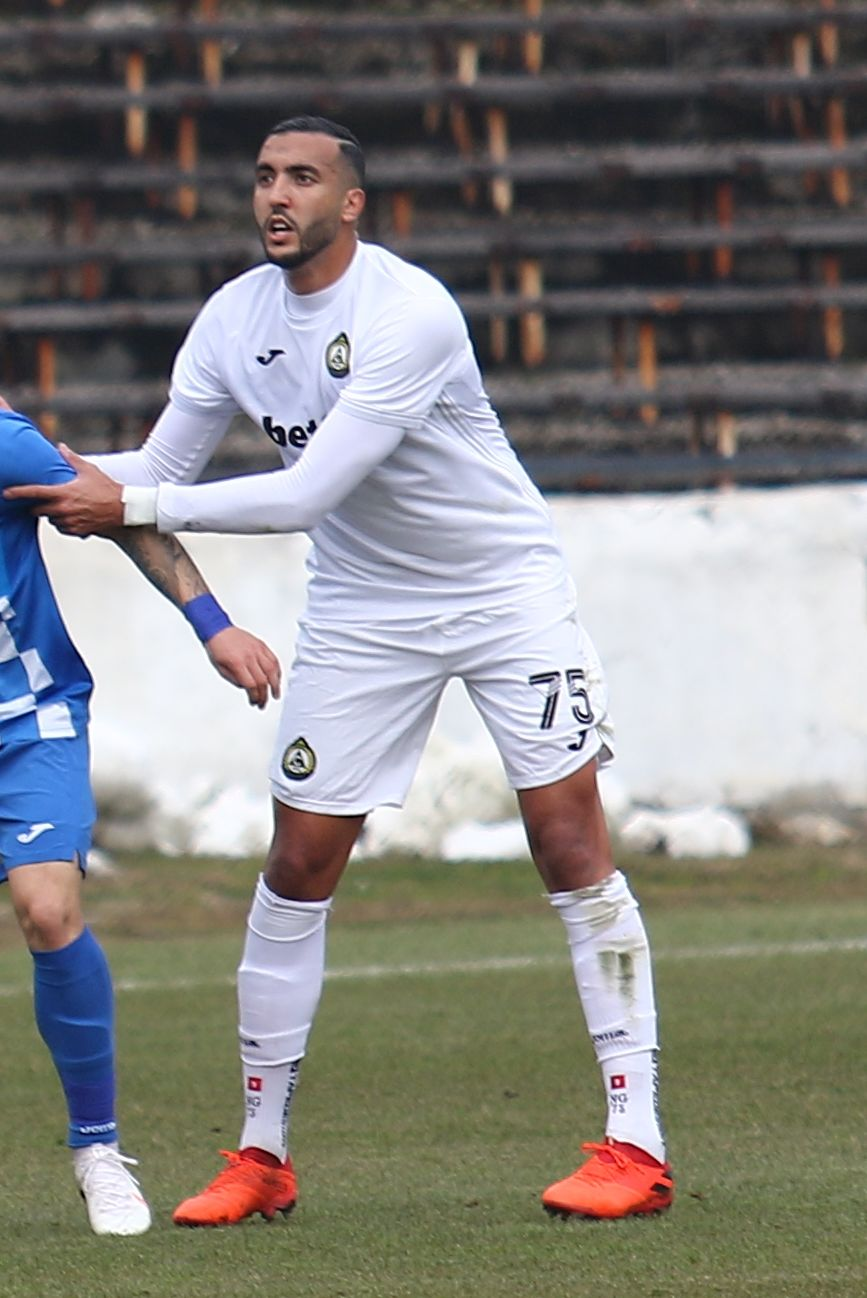
- Ghandri with Slavia Sofia in 2021

Personal information
- Full name: Nader Ghandri
- Date of birth: 18 February 1995 (age 31)
- Place of birth: Aubervilliers, France
- Height: 1.96 m (6 ft 5 in)
- Position: Centre-back

Team information
- Current team: Asswehly
- Number: 4

Youth career
- US Ivry
- 2008–2010: Red Star
- 2010–2012: Drancy

Senior career*
| Years | Team | Apps | (Gls) |
| 2012–2013 | Drancy | 9 | (0) |
| 2013–2014 | Arles | 3 | (0) |
| 2014–2017 | Club Africain | 44 | (1) |
| 2017–2019 | Antwerp | 5 | (0) |
| 2018–2019 | → Westerlo (loan) | 28 | (2) |
| 2020–2021 | Westerlo | 8 | (0) |
| 2021 | → Slavia Sofia (loan) | 13 | (0) |
| 2021–2023 | Club Africain | 30 | (0) |
| 2023–2024 | Ajman | 8 | (0) |
| 2024–2026 | Akhmat Grozny | 51 | (3) |
| 2026– | Asswehly | 14 | (0) |

International career^{‡}
| 2015 | Tunisia U23 | 2 | (0) |
| 2019–2026 | Tunisia | 19 | (0) |
- * Club domestic league appearances and goals as of 29 September 2026 ‡ National team caps and goals as of 29 September 2026

Nader Ghandri (Arabic: نادر الغندري; born 18 February 1995) is a professional footballer who plays as a centre-back for Libyan Premier League club Asswehly. Born in France, he plays for the Tunisia national team.

== Club career ==
Born in Aubervilliers, Ghandri spent his youth career with a number of Paris-based sides, playing for Ivry, Red Star and Drancy. In 2013, he signed a two-year amateur contract with Ligue 2 club AC Arles.

On 30 August 2021, he returned to Club Africain on a two-year contract.

On 6 February 2024, Ghandri signed a contract with Russian Premier League club Akhmat Grozny until June 2026. On 10 February 2026, the contract was terminated by mutual consent.

== International career ==
In 2015, Ghandri was a member of the Tunisia under-23 national team at the 2015 U-23 Africa Cup of Nations in Senegal, making two appearances in the tournament.

He made his debut for Tunisia national football team on 7 June 2019 in a friendly against Iraq, as a starter.

== Career statistics ==
=== Club ===
As of match played 5 December 2025

Appearances and goals by club, season and competition
| Club | Season | League | | | National cup | | League Cup | | Continental | | Other | | Total | |
| Club | Season | Division | Apps | Goals | Apps | Goals | Apps | Goals | Apps | Goals | Apps | Goals | Apps | Goals |
|---|---|---|---|---|---|---|---|---|---|---|---|---|---|---|
| Drancy | 2012–13 | Championnat National 2 | 9 | 0 | — | | — | | — | | — | | 9 | 0 |
| Arlésien II | 2013–14 | Championnat National 2 | 10 | 0 | — | | — | | — | | — | | 10 | 0 |
| Arlésien | 2013–14 | Ligue 2 | 3 | 0 | 0 | 0 | 1 | 0 | — | | — | | 4 | 0 |
| Club Africain | 2014–15 | Tunisian Ligue 1 | 18 | 0 | 0 | 0 | — | | — | | — | | 18 | 0 |
| Club Africain | 2015–16 | Tunisian Ligue 1 | 17 | 1 | 1 | 0 | — | | 0 | 0 | — | | 18 | 1 |
| Club Africain | 2016–17 | Tunisian Ligue 1 | 9 | 1 | 3 | 0 | — | | 5 (Note: Appearances in CAF Confederation Cup) | 0 | 4 | 0 | 21 | 1 |
| Club Africain | Total | | 44 | 2 | 4 | 0 | — | | 5 | 0 | 4 | 0 | 57 | 2 |
| Royal Antwerp | 2017–18 | Belgian Pro League | 7 | 1 | 1 | 1 | — | | — | | — | | 8 | 2 |
| Royal Antwerp | 2018–19 | Belgian Pro League | 1 | 0 | 0 | 0 | — | | — | | — | | 1 | 0 |
| Royal Antwerp | Total | | 8 | 1 | 1 | 1 | — | | — | | — | | 9 | 2 |
| Westerlo (loan) | 2018–19 | Challenger Pro League | 28 | 2 | 0 | 0 | — | | — | | — | | 28 | 2 |
| Westerlo | 2019–20 | Challenger Pro League | 3 | 0 | 0 | 0 | — | | — | | — | | 3 | 0 |
| Westerlo | 2020–21 | Challenger Pro League | 5 | 0 | 0 | 0 | — | | — | | — | | 5 | 0 |
| Westerlo | Total | | 8 | 2 | 0 | 0 | — | | — | | — | | 8 | 2 |
| Slavia Sofia (loan) | 2020–21 | efbet Liga | 11 | 0 | 3 | 0 | — | | — | | — | | 14 | 0 |
| Club Africain | 2021–22 | Tunisian Ligue 1 | 14 | 3 | 1 | 0 | — | | — | | — | | 15 | 3 |
| Club Africain | 2022–23 | Tunisian Ligue 1 | 16 | 3 | 3 | 0 | — | | 4 | 1 | — | | 23 | 4 |
| Club Africain | Total | | 30 | 6 | 4 | 0 | — | | 4 | 1 | — | | 38 | 7 |
| Ajman Club | 2023–24 | UAE Pro League | 8 | 0 | 0 | 0 | 2 | 0 | — | | — | | 10 | 0 |
| Akhmat Grozny | 2023–24 | Russian Premier League | 12 | 0 | 1 | 0 | — | | — | | — | | 13 | 0 |
| Akhmat Grozny | 2024–25 | Russian Premier League | 22 | 3 | 6 | 1 | — | | — | | — | | 28 | 4 |
| Akhmat Grozny | 2025–26 | Russian Premier League | 17 | 0 | 5 | 1 | — | | — | | — | | 22 | 1 |
| Akhmat Grozny | Total | | 51 | 3 | 12 | 2 | — | | — | | — | | 63 | 5 |
| Career total | | | 210 | 14 | 24 | 3 | 3 | 0 | 9 | 1 | 4 | 0 | 250 | 18 |

=== International ===
As of matches played on 24 March 2025

Appearances and goals by national team and year
| National team | Year | Apps | Goals |
|---|---|---|---|
| Tunisia | 2019 | 1 | 0 |
| Tunisia | 2022 | 8 | 0 |
| Tunisia | 2023 | 1 | 0 |
| Tunisia | 2024 | 7 | 0 |
| Tunisia | 2025 | 2 | 0 |
| Total | | 19 | 0 |

== Honours ==
Tunisia

- Kirin Cup Soccer: 2022
