= Camilo (footballer, born 1999) =

Brazilian footballer

Personal information
- Full name: Camilo Reijers de Oliveira
- Date of birth: 23 February 1999 (age 27)
- Place of birth: Mogi Mirim, Brazil
- Height: 1.78 m (5 ft 10 in)
- Position: Defensive midfielder

Team information
- Current team: Chapecoense (on loan from Grêmio)
- Number: 27

Youth career
- Sport Barueri
- –2019: Ponte Preta

Senior career*
Years	Team	Apps	(Gls)
2019–2020	Ponte Preta	32	(3)
2020–2023	Lyon B	4	(0)
2021–2022	→ Cuiabá (loan)	75	(2)
2023	→ RWDM (loan)	9	(0)
2023–2025	Akhmat Grozny	50	(1)
2025–	Grêmio	21	(0)
2026–	→ Chapecoense (loan)	18	(0)
- * Club domestic league appearances and goals as of 9 April 2026

Camilo Reijers de Oliveira (born 23 February 1999), simply known as Camilo, is a Brazilian professional footballer who plays as a defensive midfielder for Campeonato Brasileiro Série A club Chapecoense, on loan from Grêmio.

== Club career ==
On 28 January 2020, Camilo was released from his club in Brazil to undergo a medical with French club Lyon.

On 28 January 2023, Camilo was loaned to RWDM in Belgium until the end of the season.

On 9 August 2023, Camilo signed a three-year contract with the Russian Premier League club Akhmat Grozny.

On 11 February 2025, Camilo returned to Brazil and joined Grêmio for three seasons.

== Career statistics ==
As of match played 8 December 2024.

Appearances and goals by club, season and competition
Club	Season	League			State League		Cup		Continental		Other		Total	
Club	Season	Division	Apps	Goals	Apps	Goals	Apps	Goals	Apps	Goals	Apps	Goals	Apps	Goals
Ponte Preta	2019	Série B	30	2	0	0	0	0	—		—		30	2
Ponte Preta	2020	Série B	0	0	2	1	0	0	—		—		2	1
Ponte Preta	Total		30	2	2	1	0	0	—		—		32	3
Lyon B	2019–20	Championnat National 2	3	0	—		—		—		—		3	0
Lyon B	2020–21	Championnat National 2	1	0	—		—		—		—		1	0
Lyon B	Total		4	0	—		—		—		—		4	0
Cuiabá (loan)	2021	Série A	31	0	11	1	1	0	—		—		43	1
Cuiabá (loan)	2022	Série A	24	0	9	1	2	0	—		—		35	1
Cuiabá (loan)	Total		55	0	20	2	3	0	—		—		78	2
RWDM (loan)	2022–23	Belgian Pro League	9	0	—		—		—		—		9	0
Akhmat Grozny	2023–24	Russian Premier League	25	1	—		4	0	—		—		29	1
Akhmat Grozny	2024–25	Russian Premier League	16	0	—		6	0	—		—		22	0
Akhmat Grozny	Total		41	1	—		10	0	—		—		51	1
Career total			139	3	23	3	12	0	0	0	0	0	174	6

== Honours ==
Cuiabá

- Campeonato Mato-Grossense: 2021

== Personal life ==
Camillo is also a citizen of the Netherlands and was registered with the Russian Premier League as a Dutch player.
