= Rizvan Tashayev =

Russian footballer (born 2003)

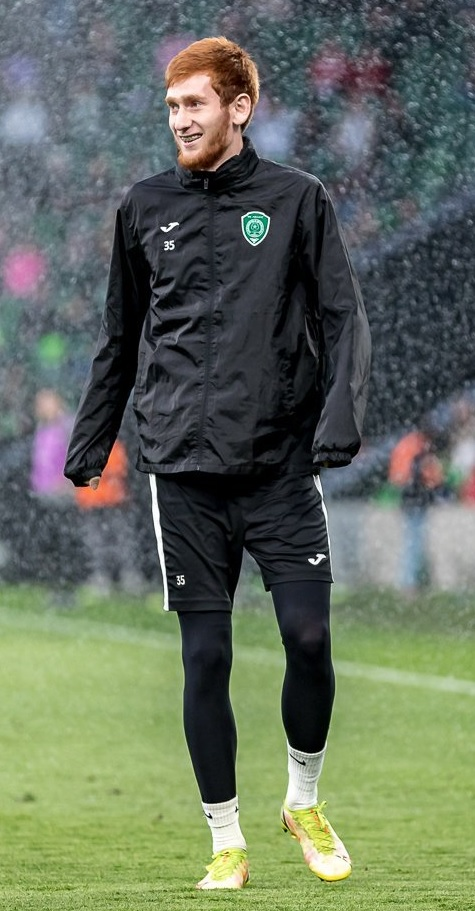
- Tashayev with Akhmat in 2022

Personal information
- Full name: Rizvan Vakhayevich Tashayev
- Date of birth: 5 October 2003 (age 23)
- Place of birth: Grozny, Russia
- Height: 1.94 m (6 ft 4 in)
- Position: Goalkeeper

Team information
- Current team: Kaluga
- Number: 88

Youth career
- Akhmat Grozny

Senior career*
Years	Team	Apps	(Gls)
2022–2025	Akhmat Grozny	1	(0)
2024	→ Dynamo Bryansk (loan)	11	(0)
2024	→ Sokol Kazan (loan)	10	(0)
2025	→ Amkar Perm (loan)	0	(0)
2025–2026	Avangard Kursk	6	(0)
2026–	Kaluga	3	(0)
- * Club domestic league appearances and goals as of 15 November 2026

Rizvan Vakhayevich Tashayev (Russian: Ризван Вахаевич Ташаев; born 5 October 2003) is a Russian footballer who plays as a goalkeeper for Kaluga.

== Career ==
Tashayev made his debut in the Russian Premier League for Akhmat Grozny on 27 August 2022 in a game against PFC Krylia Sovetov Samara.

On 16 February 2024, Tashayev signed with Russian Second League club Dynamo Bryansk. On 27 July 2024, he moved on loan to Sokol Kazan.

== Career statistics ==
As of 28 November 2022

Appearances and goals by club, season and competition
Club	Season	League			Cup		Continental		Total	
Club	Season	Division	Apps	Goals	Apps	Goals	Apps	Goals	Apps	Goals
Akhmat Grozny	2022–23	RPL	1	0	0	0	–		1	0
Career total			1	0	0	0	0	0	1	0
