= Miloš Šatara =

Bosnian footballer

Personal information
- Full name: Miloš Šatara
- Date of birth: 28 October 1995 (age 31)
- Place of birth: Gradiška, Bosnia and Herzegovina
- Height: 1.85 m (6 ft 1 in)
- Position: Centre-back

Team information
- Current team: TSC
- Number: 3

Youth career
- Kozara Gradiška

Senior career*
Years	Team	Apps	(Gls)
2012–2015	Kozara Gradiška	36	(4)
2015–2021	Mladost Lučani	177	(10)
2021–2022	Shakhtyor Soligorsk	34	(3)
2023–2026	Akhmat Grozny	41	(1)
2026–	TSC	10	(2)

International career^{‡}
2013	Bosnia and Herzegovina U19	4	(0)
2015–2016	Bosnia and Herzegovina U21	3	(0)
- * Club domestic league appearances and goals as of 13 June 2026 ‡ National team caps and goals as of 20 June 2017

Miloš Šatara (Serbian Cyrillic: Милош Шатара; born 28 October 1995) is a Bosnian footballer who plays as a centre-back for Serbian SuperLiga club TSC.

== Club career ==
=== Kozara Gradiška ===
Born in Gradiška, Šatara started his career with local club Kozara at the age of 16. He collected 36 caps for 2 seasons in the First League of the Republika Srpska, for the period between 2013 and 2015, scoring 2 goals in each of the seasons. As a coincidence, 3 of 4 goals he scored in 20 minutes of those matches, and fourth in 22 minutes. Šatara also captained the team in 22 fixture of 2014–15 season, against Napredak Donji Šepak. After the end of season, he left the club.

=== Mladost Lučani ===
In summer 2015 he moved to Serbia, and joined Mladost Lučani, as a member of Bosnia and Herzegovina U21 national team selection. He made his professional debut for Mladost Lučani in the first fixture of Serbian SuperLiga against Jagodina. Although his career as a defensive midfielder, Šatara converted position on the field in later years. Playing with Mladost, he has been usually used as a defender.

=== Akhmat Grozny ===
On 12 January 2023, Šatara signed with Russian Premier League club FC Akhmat Grozny.

=== TSC ===
On 13 January 2026, Šatara moved to TSC in Serbia.

== International career ==
Šatara made his first international appearances with Bosnia and Herzegovina under-18 level. Later he has also been called in selections under-19 and 21 years.

== Career statistics ==
=== Club ===
As of match played 20 July 2025

Club	Season	League			Cup		Continental		Other		Total	
Club	Season	Division	Apps	Goals	Apps	Goals	Apps	Goals	Apps	Goals	Apps	Goals
Kozara Gradiška	2013–14	First League of the Republika Srpska	13	2	—		—		—		13	2
Kozara Gradiška	2014–15	First League of the Republika Srpska	23	2	—		—		—		23	2
Kozara Gradiška	Total		36	4	—		—		—		36	4
Mladost Lučani	2015–16	Serbian SuperLiga	23	0	1	0	—		—		24	0
Mladost Lučani	2016–17	Serbian SuperLiga	33	1	3	0	—		—		36	1
Mladost Lučani	2017–18	Serbian SuperLiga	31	1	5	0	2 (Note: Appearances in UEFA Europa League)	0	—		38	1
Mladost Lučani	2018–19	Serbian SuperLiga	14	0	2	0	—		—		16	0
Mladost Lučani	2019–20	Serbian SuperLiga	26	3	1	0	—		—		27	3
Mladost Lučani	2020–21	Serbian SuperLiga	35	4	1	1	—		—		36	5
Mladost Lučani	Total		162	9	13	1	2	0	—		177	10
Shakhter Soligorsk	2021	Belarusian Premier League	12	2	1	0	0	0	—		14	2
Shakhter Soligorsk	2022	Belarusian Premier League	16	1	0	0	4 (Note: Two appearances in UEFA Champions League, two appearances in UEFA Europa Conference League)	0	1 (Note: Appearance in Belarusian Super Cup)	0	21	1
Shakhter Soligorsk	Total		28	3	1	0	4	0	1	0	35	3
Akhmat Grozny	2022–23	Russian Premier League	6	0	2	0	—		—		8	0
Akhmat Grozny	2023–24	Russian Premier League	7	1	2	0	—		—		9	1
Akhmat Grozny	2024–25	Russian Premier League	14	0	7	0	—		2 (Note: Appearances in the relegation play-offs)	0	23	0
Akhmat Grozny	2025–26	Russian Premier League	1	0	0	0	—		—		1	0
Akhmat Grozny	Total		28	1	11	0	—		2	0	41	1
Career total			254	17	25	1	6	0	3	0	289	18
