= Zaim Divanović =

Montenegrin footballer

Personal information
- Date of birth: 9 December 2000 (age 25)
- Place of birth: Bar, Montenegro
- Height: 1.79 m (5 ft 10 in)
- Position: Midfielder

Team information
- Current team: Petrovac
- Number: 23

Senior career*
Years	Team	Apps	(Gls)
2017–2018	Otrant-Olympic	28	(3)
2018–2019	Titograd	12	(0)
2018–2019	→ Otrant-Olympic (loan)	21	(0)
2019–2022	Petrovac	54	(8)
2019–2020	→ Otrant-Olympic (loan)	24	(2)
2022	Shakhtyor Soligorsk	23	(1)
2023–2025	Akhmat Grozny	18	(0)
2025–	Petrovac	10	(1)

International career^{‡}
2014	Montenegro U15	2	(0)
2018	Montenegro U19	9	(2)
2021–2022	Montenegro U21	8	(0)
- * Club domestic league appearances and goals as of 17 June 2026 ‡ National team caps and goals as of 10 June 2022

Zaim Divanović (Montenegrin Cyrillic: Заим Дивановић; born 9 December 2000) is a Montenegrin football player who plays as a central midfielder for Petrovac.

== Career ==
On 12 January 2023, Divanović signed a three-and-a-half-year contract with Russian Premier League club Akhmat Grozny. He made his RPL debut for Akhmat on 11 March 2023 in a game against Lokomotiv Moscow. On 8 July 2025, the contract was terminated by mutual consent.

== Career statistics ==
As of match played 28 May 2025

Appearances and goals by club, season and competition
Club	Season	League			Cup		Continental		Other		Total	
Club	Season	Division	Apps	Goals	Apps	Goals	Apps	Goals	Apps	Goals	Apps	Goals
Otrant-Olympic	2016–17	Montenegrin Second League	6	0	—		—		—		6	0
Otrant-Olympic	2017–18	Montenegrin Second League	22	3	2	1	—		—		24	4
Otrant-Olympic	Total		28	3	2	1	0	0	0	0	30	4
Otrant-Olympic (co-registration)	2018–19	Montenegrin Second League	21	0	0	0	—		—		21	0
Otrant-Olympic (co-registration)	2019–20	Montenegrin Second League	24	2	0	0	—		—		24	2
Otrant-Olympic (co-registration)	Total		55	2	0	0	0	0	0	0	55	2
Titograd	2018–19	Montenegrin First League	12	0	—		—		—		12	0
Titograd	2019–20	Montenegrin First League	—		—		0	0	—		0	0
Titograd	Total		12	0	0	0	0	0	0	0	12	0
Petrovac	2019–20	Montenegrin First League	1	0	0	0	—		—		1	0
Petrovac	2020–21	Montenegrin First League	35	5	0	0	—		2 (Note: Appearances in the relegation play-offs)	0	37	5
Petrovac	2021–22	Montenegrin First League	18	3	1	0	—		—		19	3
Petrovac	Total		54	8	1	0	0	0	2	0	57	8
Shakhtyor Soligorsk	2022	Belarusian Premier League	23	1	1	0	4 (Note: Two appearances in the UEFA Champions League, two appearances in the UEFA Europa Conference League)	0	—		28	1
Akhmat Grozny	2022–23	Russian Premier League	5	0	1	0	—		—		6	0
Akhmat Grozny	2023–24	Russian Premier League	6	0	3	0	—		—		9	0
Akhmat Grozny	2024–25	Russian Premier League	7	0	6	0	—		1	0	14	0
Akhmat Grozny	Total		18	0	10	0	0	0	1	0	29	0
Career total			95	9	12	0	4	0	3	0	114	9
