= Magomed Yakuyev =

Russian footballer (born 2004)

Personal information
- Full name: Magomed Ruslanovich Yakuyev
- Date of birth: 7 June 2004 (age 22)
- Place of birth: Achkhoy-Martan, Russia
- Height: 1.74 m (5 ft 9 in)
- Position: Left midfielder

Team information
- Current team: Ufa
- Number: 11

Youth career
- Akhmat Grozny

Senior career*
Years	Team	Apps	(Gls)
2022–2026	Akhmat Grozny	5	(0)
2026–	Ufa	12	(1)
- * Club domestic league appearances and goals as of 16 May 2026

Magomed Ruslanovich Yakuyev (Russian: Магомед Русланович Якуев; born 7 June 2004) is a Russian footballer who plays as a left midfielder for Ufa.

== Career ==
Yakuyev made his debut for Akhmat Grozny on 19 October 2022 in a Russian Cup game against FC Orenburg. He made his Russian Premier League debut for Akhmat on 6 May 2023 against FC Torpedo Moscow.

On 2 February 2026, Yakuyev signed with Ufa.

== Career statistics ==
As of 18 May 2025

Club	Season	League			Cup		Continental		Total	
Club	Season	Division	Apps	Goals	Apps	Goals	Apps	Goals	Apps	Goals
Akhmat Grozny	2022–23	Russian Premier League	2	0	1	0	—		3	0
Akhmat Grozny	2023–24	Russian Premier League	1	0	0	0	—		1	0
Akhmat Grozny	2024–25	Russian Premier League	2	0	3	0	—		5	0
Akhmat Grozny	Total		5	0	4	0	0	0	9	0
Career total			5	0	4	0	0	0	9	0
