= Semyon Stolbov =

Russian footballer

Personal information
- Full name: Semyon Sergeyevich Stolbov
- Date of birth: 25 February 2003 (age 23)
- Place of birth: Ramenskoye, Moscow Oblast, Russia
- Height: 1.86 m (6 ft 1 in)
- Position: Defender

Team information
- Current team: Torpedo Miass (on loan from Orenburg)
- Number: 61

Youth career
- –2014: SSh Avangard-Pioner Ramensky District
- 2015: Chertanovo Moscow
- 2016–2017: Rubin Kazan
- 2017–2020: FShM Moscow

Senior career*
Years	Team	Apps	(Gls)
2021–	Orenburg	2	(0)
2021	→ Minsk (loan)	9	(0)
2022–	→ Orenburg-2	69	(2)
2026–	→ Torpedo Miass (loan)	24	(1)
- * Club domestic league appearances and goals as of 17 October 2026

Semyon Sergeyevich Stolbov (Russian: Семён Сергеевич Столбов; born 25 February 2003) is a Russian professional footballer who plays for Torpedo Miass on loan from Orenburg.

== Career ==
Stolbov made his debut for the main squad of Orenburg on 2 November 2023 in a Russian Cup game against CSKA Moscow. He made his Russian Premier League debut for Orenburg on 30 November 2024 against Akron Tolyatti.

== Career statistics ==
As of match played 19 October 2025

Appearances and goals by club, season and competition
Club	Season	League			Cup		Continental		Total	
Club	Season	Division	Apps	Goals	Apps	Goals	Apps	Goals	Apps	Goals
Minsk	2021	Belarusian Premier League	9	0	1	0	—		10	0
Orenburg-2	2021–22	Russian Second League	10	0	—		—		10	0
Orenburg-2	2022–23	Russian Second League	21	1	—		—		21	1
Orenburg-2	2023	Russian Second League B	13	0	—		—		13	0
Orenburg-2	2024	Russian Second League B	19	0	—		—		19	0
Orenburg-2	2025	Russian Second League B	6	1	—		—		6	1
Orenburg-2	Total		69	2	—		—		69	2
Orenburg	2023–24	Russian Premier League	0	0	2	0	—		2	0
Orenburg	2024–25	Russian Premier League	2	0	3	0	—		5	0
Orenburg	Total		2	0	5	0	—		7	0
Career total			80	2	6	0	0	0	86	2
