= Mamadou Maiga =

Malian footballer (born 1995)

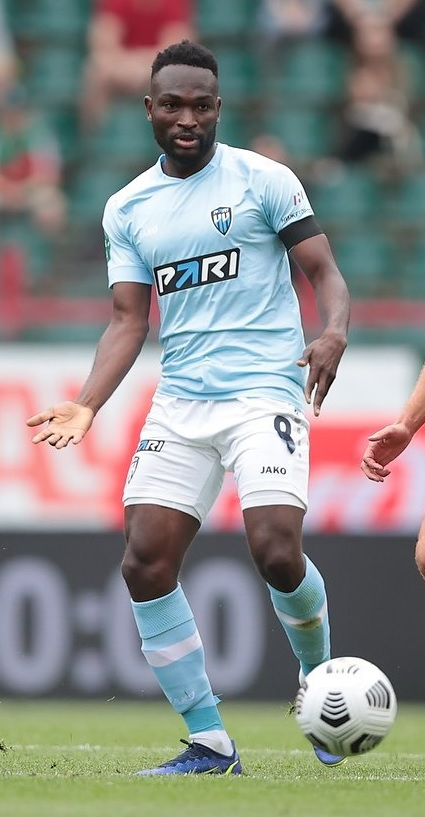
- Maida with Pari NN in 2022

Personal information
- Date of birth: 10 February 1995 (age 31)
- Place of birth: Bamako, Mali
- Height: 1.78 m (5 ft 10 in)
- Position: Midfielder

Team information
- Current team: Pari NN
- Number: 8

Senior career*
Years	Team	Apps	(Gls)
–2020	Jeanne d'Arc		
2020–2022	Veles Moscow	60	(1)
2022–	Pari Nizhny Novgorod	63	(1)

International career^{‡}
2026–	Mali	1	(0)
- * Club domestic league appearances and goals as of 18 April 2026 ‡ National team caps and goals as of 31 March 2026

Mamadou Maiga (Russian: Мамаду Майга; born 10 February 1995) is a Malian professional football player who plays for Russian club Pari Nizhny Novgorod and the Mali national team.

== Club career ==
He made his debut in the Russian Football National League for FC Veles Moscow on 8 August 2020 in a game against PFC Krylia Sovetov Samara, as a starter.

On 30 June 2022, Maiga signed a three-year contract with Russian Premier League club FC Pari Nizhny Novgorod.

On 19 September 2023, Maiga extended his contract with Pari Nizhny Novgorod to June 2027.

== International career ==
Maiga was first called up to the senior Mali national team in March 2024 for friendlies against Mauritania and Nigeria.

== Personal life ==
Maiga acquired citizenship of Russia in November 2021.

== Career statistics ==
=== Club ===
As of match played 18 April 2026

Club	Season	League			Cup		Other		Total	
Club	Season	Division	Apps	Goals	Apps	Goals	Apps	Goals	Apps	Goals
Jeanne d'Arc	2017–18	Malien Premiere Division	0	0	0	0	—		0	0
Jeanne d'Arc	2018–19	Malien Premiere Division	0	0	0	0	—		0	0
Jeanne d'Arc	2019–20	Malien Premiere Division	0	0	0	0	—		0	0
Jeanne d'Arc	Total		0	0	0	0	0	0	0	0
Veles Moscow	2020–21	Russian First League	35	0	3	0	—		38	0
Veles Moscow	2021–22	Russian First League	25	1	2	0	—		27	1
Veles Moscow	Total		60	1	5	0	0	0	65	1
Pari NN	2022–23	Russian Premier League	22	1	7	0	1 (Note: Appearance in relegation play-offs)	0	30	1
Pari NN	2023–24	Russian Premier League	20	0	4	0	—		24	0
Pari NN	2024–25	Russian Premier League	10	0	0	0	—		10	0
Pari NN	2025–26	Russian Premier League	11	0	6	0	—		17	0
Pari NN	Total		63	1	17	0	1	0	81	1
Career total			137	3	28	0	1	0	166	3

=== International ===
As of match played 31 March 2026

Appearances and goals by national team and year
National team	Year	Apps	Goals
Mali	2026	1	0
Total		1	0
