= Néné Gbamblé =

Ivorian footballer

Personal information
- Date of birth: 9 May 2002 (age 24)
- Place of birth: Ivory Coast
- Height: 1.73 m (5 ft 8 in)
- Position: Midfielder

Senior career*
| Years | Team | Apps | (Gls) |
| 2021 | Rubikon Kyiv | 10 | (0) |
| 2021 | Olimpik Donetsk | 18 | (0) |
| 2022 | Celje | 21 | (3) |
| 2023–2024 | Akhmat Grozny | 11 | (1) |
| 2024 | Torpedo Moscow | 0 | (0) |
| 2024 | → Shinnik Yaroslavl | 8 | (0) |
| 2025–2026 | Kyzylzhar | 14 | (1) |
| 2026 | Al Kharaitiyat | 6 | (1) |
- * Club domestic league appearances and goals as of 2 August 2026

Néné Bi Junior Gbamblé (born 9 May 2002) is an Ivorian football player who plays as a midfielder.

== Career ==
On 21 January 2023, Gbamblé signed a 3.5-year contract with the Russian Premier League club Akhmat Grozny. He made his RPL debut for Akhmat on 23 April 2023 in a game against Sochi.

On 1 June 2024, Gbamblé moved to Russian First League club Torpedo Moscow.

== Career statistics ==
As of 25 May 2024

Appearances and goals by club, season and competition
| Club | Season | League | | | Cup | | Other | | Total | |
| Club | Season | Division | Apps | Goals | Apps | Goals | Apps | Goals | Apps | Goals |
|---|---|---|---|---|---|---|---|---|---|---|
| Rubikon | 2020–21 | Druha Liga | 6 | 0 | — | | — | | 6 | 0 |
| Olimpik Donetsk | 2021–22 | Ukrainian First League | 18 | 0 | 2 | 0 | — | | 20 | 0 |
| Celje | 2021–22 | PrvaLiga | 6 | 1 | — | | — | | 6 | 1 |
| Celje | 2022–23 | PrvaLiga | 15 | 2 | 2 | 0 | — | | 17 | 2 |
| Celje | Total | | 21 | 3 | 2 | 0 | — | | 23 | 3 |
| Akhmat Grozny | 2022–23 | Russian Premier League | 5 | 1 | 0 | 0 | — | | 5 | 1 |
| Akhmat Grozny | 2023–24 | Russian Premier League | 6 | 0 | 4 | 0 | — | | 10 | 0 |
| Akhmat Grozny | Total | | 11 | 1 | 4 | 0 | — | | 15 | 1 |
| Career total | | | 56 | 4 | 8 | 0 | 0 | 0 | 64 | 4 |
