= Minkail Matsuyev =

Russian footballer

Personal information
- Full name: Minkail Magomedovich Matsuyev
- Date of birth: 3 February 2000 (age 26)
- Place of birth: Kurchaloy, Russia
- Height: 1.70 m (5 ft 7 in)
- Position: Central midfielder

Youth career
- –2020: Akhmat Grozny

Senior career*
Years	Team	Apps	(Gls)
2020–2021	Krasnodar-3	6	(0)
2023–2025	Akhmat Grozny	1	(0)
2025	Saturn Ramenskoye	0	(0)
- * Club domestic league appearances and goals as of 2 November 2025

Minkail Magomedovich Matsuyev (Russian: Минкаил Магомедович Мацуев; born 3 February 2000) is a Russian football player who plays as a central midfielder.

== Career ==
On 21 February 2023, Matsuyev returned to his youth club Akhmat Grozny on a contract until the end of the 2022–23 season. He made his Russian Premier League debut for Akhmat on 14 May 2023 in a game against Dynamo Moscow. Matsuyev left Akhmat on 14 June 2025.

== Career statistics ==
As of 6 November 2024

Club	Season	League			Cup		Continental		Total	
Club	Season	Division	Apps	Goals	Apps	Goals	Apps	Goals	Apps	Goals
Krasnodar-3	2020–21	Russian Second League	6	0	–		–		6	0
Akhmat Grozny	2022–23	Russian Premier League	1	0	0	0	–		1	0
Akhmat Grozny	2023–24	Russian Premier League	0	0	2	0	–		2	0
Akhmat Grozny	2024–25	Russian Premier League	0	0	1	0	–		1	0
Akhmat Grozny	Total		1	0	3	0	0	0	4	0
Career total			7	0	3	0	0	0	10	0
