= Mikhail Oparin =

Russian footballer

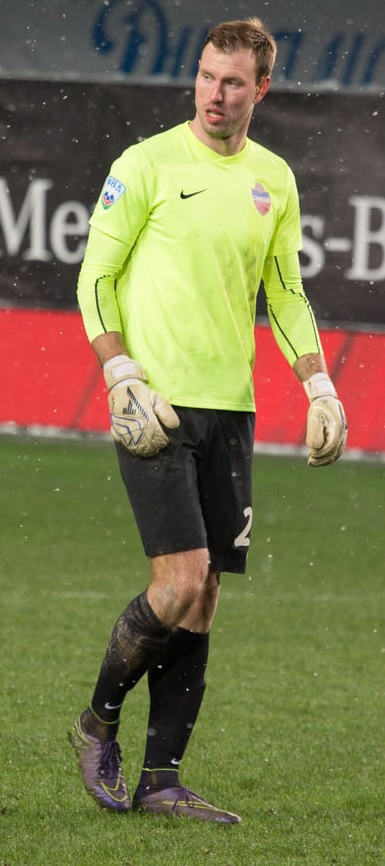
- Oparin with Yenisey Krasnoyarsk in 2016

Personal information
- Full name: Mikhail Sergeyevich Oparin
- Date of birth: 22 May 1993 (age 33)
- Place of birth: Omsk, Russia
- Height: 1.91 m (6 ft 3 in)
- Position: Goalkeeper

Team information
- Current team: Yenisey Krasnoyarsk
- Number: 1

Youth career
- Akademiya Tolyatti
- Krylia Sovetov Samara

Senior career*
Years	Team	Apps	(Gls)
2011–2013	Amkar Perm	0	(0)
2013	→ Kaluga (loan)	9	(0)
2013–2014	Irtysh Omsk	15	(0)
2014–2017	Yenisey Krasnoyarsk	32	(0)
2017–2018	Tosno	2	(0)
2018	Krylia Sovetov Samara	0	(0)
2018–2019	SKA-Khabarovsk	18	(0)
2019–2022	Yenisey Krasnoyarsk	74	(0)
2022–2025	Akhmat Grozny	9	(0)
2025	Shinnik Yaroslavl	6	(0)
2025–2026	Ural Yekaterinburg	1	(0)
2026–	Yenisey Krasnoyarsk	0	(0)
- * Club domestic league appearances and goals as of 16 May 2026

Mikhail Sergeyevich Oparin (Russian: Михаил Сергеевич Опарин; born 22 May 1993) is a Russian professional footballer who plays as a goalkeeper for Yenisey Krasnoyarsk.

== Club career ==
He made his debut in the Russian Second Division for Kaluga on 16 April 2013 in a game against Metallurg Vyksa.

He made his Russian Premier League debut for Tosno on 4 March 2018 in a game against SKA-Khabarovsk.

On 10 June 2022, Oparin signed a contract with Akhmat Grozny for a term of two years, with a team option to extend for one more year.

On 13 February 2025, Oparin moved to Shinnik Yaroslavl in the Russian First League.

== Honours ==
=== Club ===
Tosno

- Russian Cup: 2017–18

== Career statistics ==
As of match played 8 December 2024

Club	Season	League			Cup		Europe		Other		Total	
Club	Season	Division	Apps	Goals	Apps	Goals	Apps	Goals	Apps	Goals	Apps	Goals
Krylia Sovetov Samara	2010	Russian Premier League	0	0	0	0	—		—		0	0
Amkar Perm	2011–12	Russian Premier League	0	0	0	0	—		—		0	0
Amkar Perm	2012–13	Russian Premier League	0	0	0	0	—		—		0	0
Amkar Perm	Total		0	0	0	0	—		—		0	0
Kaluga	2012–13	Russian Second League	9	0	–		–		–		9	0
Irtysh Omsk	2013–14	Russian Second League	15	0	2	0	–		–		17	0
Yenisey Krasnoyarsk	2014–15	Russian First League	3	0	0	0	–		–		3	0
Yenisey Krasnoyarsk	2015–16	Russian First League	2	0	0	0	–		–		2	0
Yenisey Krasnoyarsk	2016–17	Russian First League	27	0	3	0	–		2 (Note: Two appearances in promotion play-offs)	0	32	0
Yenisey Krasnoyarsk	Total		32	0	3	0	0	0	2	0	37	0
Tosno	2017–18	Russian Premier League	2	0	2	0	–		–		4	0
Krylia Sovetov Samara	2018–19	Russian Premier League	0	0	—		—		—		0	0
SKA-Khabarovsk	2018–19	Russian First League	18	0	0	0	—		—		18	0
Yenisey Krasnoyarsk	2019–20	Russian First League	10	0	0	0	—		4 (Note: Appearances in the FNL Cup)	0	14	0
Yenisey Krasnoyarsk	2020–21	Russian First League	33	0	3	0	—		—		36	0
Yenisey Krasnoyarsk	2021–22	Russian First League	31	0	5	0	—		—		36	0
Yenisey Krasnoyarsk	Total		74	0	8	0	—		4	0	86	0
Akhmat Grozny	2022–23	Russian Premier League	2	0	3	0	—		—		5	0
Akhmat Grozny	2023–24	Russian Premier League	6	0	5	0	—		—		11	0
Akhmat Grozny	2024–25	Russian Premier League	1	0	6	0	—		—		7	0
Akhmat Grozny	Total		9	0	13	0	0	0	0	0	22	0
Career total			159	0	29	0	0	0	6	0	194	0
