= Vladislav Volkov (Russian footballer) =

Russian footballer (born 2000)

Personal information
- Full name: Vladislav Vadimovich Volkov
- Date of birth: 18 May 2000 (age 26)
- Place of birth: Bilhorod-Dnistrovskyi, Ukraine
- Height: 1.93 m (6 ft 4 in)
- Position: Centre-back

Team information
- Current team: Veles Moscow
- Number: 3

Youth career
- Strogino Moscow

Senior career*
Years	Team	Apps	(Gls)
2016–2019	Strogino Moscow	16	(0)
2019–2022	Rodina Moscow	40	(12)
2021–2022	→ Chayka Peschanokopskoye (loan)	13	(1)
2022–2023	Chayka Peschanokopskoye	38	(2)
2023–2025	Akhmat Grozny	3	(0)
2024	→ Leningradets (loan)	11	(0)
2024–2025	→ Volgar Astrakhan (loan)	13	(0)
2025	Mashuk-KMV	14	(1)
2025–	Veles Moscow	25	(2)

International career^{‡}
2015–2016	Russia U16	3	(0)
2016	Russia U17	1	(0)
- * Club domestic league appearances and goals as of 13 June 2026 ‡ National team caps and goals as of 15 October 2016

Vladislav Vadimovich Volkov (Russian: Владислав Вадимович Волков; born 18 May 2000) is a Russian football player who plays as a centre-back for Veles Moscow.

== Career ==
On 14 June 2023, Volkov signed a contract with Russian Premier League club Akhmat Grozny.

He made his RPL debut for Akhmat on 22 July 2023 in a game against Krylia Sovetov Samara.

On 9 January 2024, Volkov was loaned to Russian First League club Leningradets until the end of the season.
