= FC Sokol Kazan =

Russian football club

- Full name: Football Club Sokol Kazan
- Founded: November 12, 2018; 7 years ago
- Dissolved: July 6, 2025; 11 months ago
- Executive director: Ilgiz Garayev
- League: TBC
- 2024: Russian Second League, Division B, Group 4, 4th
- Website: fc-sokol.ru

FC Sokol Kazan (Russian: «Сокол» (Казань)) is a Russian football team from Kazan.

The club was established in 2018.

On 19 February 2024, the club was licensed for the Russian Second League Division B. It was assigned to Group 4.

In July 2024, the club was put up for sale through a classified advertisement on Avito website as their sponsor decided not to finance the club anymore. Shortly after that, a new owner has been found.

On 15 July 2025, the club announced it will drop out of the Russian Second League due to financial issues.
